= 1490 AM =

AM radio frequency

The following radio stations broadcast on AM frequency 1490 kHz: 1490 AM is a Regional (Class B) outside the coterminous 48 United States (Alaska, Hawaii, Puerto Rico & U.S. Virgin Islands), and a Local (Class C) frequency within the contiguous 48 states.

== Argentina ==
- LV22 in Huinca Renanco, Cordoba.
- Radio Gama in Buenos Aires.

== Canada ==
Call sign	City of license	Daytime power (kW)	Nighttime power (kW)	Transmitter coordinates
CBPC-1	Glacier Park, British Columbia	0.005	0.005	51.3°N 117.501°W
CBPP	Prince Edward Island National Park, Prince Edward Island	0.02	0.02	46.4864°N 63.3136°W
CFNC	Cross Lake, Manitoba	0.05	0.05	54.6244°N 97.7825°W
CJSN	Shaunavon, Saskatchewan	1	1	49.641389°N 108.4875°W

== Mexico ==
- XECJC-AM in Ciudad Juárez, Chihuahua
- XEYTM-AM in Teocelo, Veracruz

== United States ==
Call sign	City of license	Facility ID	Class	Daytime power (kW)	Nighttime power (kW)	Unlimited power (kW)	Transmitter coordinates
KBIX	Muskogee, Oklahoma	14893	C	1	1		35.782222°N 95.376944°W
KBKR	Baker, Oregon	24794	C			1	44.788333°N 117.809722°W
KBLF	Red Bluff, California	48853	C	1	1		40.193611°N 122.215556°W
KBST	Big Spring, Texas	33684	C			1	32.262222°N 101.460278°W
KBUR	Burlington, Iowa	39268	C			0.76	40.823889°N 91.1425°W
KBZY	Salem, Oregon	8608	C	1	1		44.881667°N 122.985°W
KCFC	Boulder, Colorado	70405	C	0.29	0.29		39.964722°N 105.235278°W
KCID	Caldwell, Idaho	68593	C			1	43.664167°N 116.636111°W
KCPX	Spanish Valley, Utah	160408	C	1	1		38.467778°N 109.438333°W
KCUZ	Clifton, Arizona	72369	C			1	33.041667°N 109.294444°W
KDBM	Dillon, Montana	4487	C	1	1		45.236111°N 112.645833°W
KDMO	Carthage, Missouri	9216	C			1	37.182778°N 94.361944°W
KDRO	Sedalia, Missouri	40662	C	0.78	0.78		38.676389°N 93.254444°W
KDRS	Paragould, Arkansas	59151	C	1	1		36.050278°N 90.462222°W
KEUN	Eunice, Louisiana	67746	C			1	30.471389°N 92.414167°W
KEYG	Grand Coulee, Washington	72155	C	1	0.96		47.884444°N 118.972222°W
KFCR	Custer, South Dakota	43913	C			0.83	43.7175°N 103.583333°W
KFFN	Tucson, Arizona	2433	C			1	32.248889°N 110.924722°W
KGBA	Heber, California	8174	C	1	1		32.741944°N 115.552222°W
KGOS	Torrington, Wyoming	46738	C			1	42.072222°N 104.227778°W
KHTC	Malmstrom AFB, Montana	161342	C	1	0.58		47.479167°N 111.241111°W
KHVL	Huntsville, Texas	70720	C			1	30.696667°N 95.552222°W
KIBM	Omaha, Nebraska	74104	C	0.97	0.9		41.233056°N 95.967222°W
KJFK	Austin, Texas	41211	C			1	30.253611°N 97.706944°W
KJIN	Houma, Louisiana	25521	C			1	29.570556°N 90.728333°W
KJNT	Jackson, Wyoming	161525	C	1	1		43.474444°N 110.768611°W
KJOQ	Duluth, Minnesota	65661	C	1	1		46.724444°N 92.119722°W
KKAN	Phillipsburg, Kansas	70774	C			1	39.792222°N 99.331944°W
KLGR	Redwood Falls, Minnesota	9680	C			1	44.5425°N 95.1325°W
KLNT	Laredo, Texas	42149	C			1	27.494722°N 99.471111°W
KLOG	Kelso, Washington	70647	C			1	46.116667°N 122.885278°W
KLZN	Susanville, California	160277	C	0.95	0.87		40.443889°N 120.643056°W
KMET	Banning, California	55239	C			1	33.930278°N 116.922222°W
KMFS	Guthrie, Oklahoma	50165	C			1	35.882222°N 97.392778°W
KNAM	Silt, Colorado	160492	C	0.74	0.74		39.560278°N 107.651389°W
KNDC	Hettinger, North Dakota	27100	C			1	46.019722°N 102.6925°W
KNEL	Brady, Texas	59540	C			1	31.13°N 99.3225°W
KOGN	Ogden, Utah	5175	C	1	1		41.239722°N 111.982778°W
KORN	Mitchell, South Dakota	35420	C			1	43.703889°N 97.999167°W
KOSJ	Santa Barbara, California	61712	C			1	34.418611°N 119.686111°W
KOVC	Valley City, North Dakota	60497	C			1	46.913333°N 98.017222°W
KPKE	Gunnison, Colorado	76979	C			1	38.565833°N 106.925556°W
KPLT	Paris, Texas	35483	C			1	33.635278°N 95.553889°W
KRIB	Mason City, Iowa	47095	C			1	43.135°N 93.207778°W
KRKC	King City, California	54554	C			1	36.226111°N 121.123889°W
KRTN	Raton, New Mexico	55188	C	1	1		36.886667°N 104.443056°W
KRUI	Ruidoso Downs, New Mexico	39523	C			1	33.321389°N 105.59°W
KRUS	Ruston, Louisiana	58272	C			1	32.513333°N 92.665556°W
KSKR	Roseburg, Oregon	17415	C	1	1		43.193056°N 123.360833°W
KTEL	Walla Walla, Washington	12511	C	1	1		46.023611°N 118.354722°W
KTOP	Topeka, Kansas	62236	C			1	39.0775°N 95.679444°W
KTTR	Rolla, Missouri	35681	C	1	1		37.944444°N 91.744722°W
KUGR	Green River, Wyoming	70698	C			1	41.515556°N 109.436389°W
KVWC	Vernon, Texas	33056	C			1	34.153333°N 99.269167°W
KWAC	Bakersfield, California	35109	C	0.64	0.64		35.348056°N 119.009167°W
KWMC	Del Rio, Texas	21247	C			1	29.371389°N 100.865278°W
KWOK	Aberdeen, Washington	68057	C	1	1		46.958333°N 123.809722°W
KWXT	Dardanelle, Arkansas	23872	C			1	35.218889°N 93.127222°W
KXAR	Hope, Arkansas	33763	C			0.7	33.688889°N 93.598611°W
KXLQ	Indianola, Iowa	70891	C	0.5	1		41.356667°N 93.587778°W
KXRA	Alexandria, Minnesota	51523	C	1	1		45.868333°N 95.363056°W
KXRE	Manitou Springs, Colorado	54258	C	0.5	1		38.861944°N 104.925556°W
KYCA	Prescott, Arizona	61433	C			1	34.550833°N 112.4625°W
KYNR	Toppenish, Washington	24586	C			1	46.375833°N 120.321667°W
KYZS	Tyler, Texas	72779	C	1	1		32.375°N 95.269444°W
KZEZ	Santa Clara, Utah	160278	C	1	1		37.111667°N 113.511944°W
KZNB	Petaluma, California	52345	C			1	38.226944°N 122.621389°W
KZZN	Littlefield, Texas	19507	C			1	33.938056°N 102.343889°W
KZZZ	Bullhead City, Arizona	8387	C	1	1		35.168889°N 114.637778°W
WABJ	Adrian, Michigan	22648	C			1	41.900556°N 84.014167°W
WAEY	Princeton, West Virginia	4945	C			1	37.389722°N 81.099444°W
WAFZ	Immokalee, Florida	25811	C	0.56	0.7		26.409444°N 81.43°W
WANG	Biloxi, Mississippi	37095	C			1	30.393889°N 88.999444°W
WARK	Hagerstown, Maryland	39807	C			1	39.626389°N 77.711111°W
WAZZ	Fayetteville, North Carolina	72058	C	1	1		35.068333°N 78.9025°W
WBAE	Portland, Maine	49983	C	1	1		43.663333°N 70.271389°W
WBCB	Levittown, Pennsylvania	53648	C			1	40.168889°N 74.835556°W
WBEX	Chillicothe, Ohio	52041	C			1	39.331111°N 82.996944°W
WBGA	Brunswick, Georgia	36930	C			0.6	31.161667°N 81.474444°W
WBSS	Pleasantville, New Jersey	30040	C	0.4	0.4		39.39°N 74.5125°W
WBTA	Batavia, New York	31811	C	1	0.71		42.976389°N 78.186667°W
WCCM	Haverhill, Massachusetts	49382	C			1	42.772778°N 71.100278°W
WCDO	Sidney, New York	9685	C			1	42.323333°N 75.3825°W
WCHM	Clarkesville, Georgia	32298	C	0.79	0.79		34.6075°N 83.5375°W
WCLD	Cleveland, Mississippi	54530	C			1	33.733611°N 90.713889°W
WCLU	Glasgow, Kentucky	57895	C	1	1		36.983889°N 85.872222°W
WCLY	Bridport, Vermont	53612	C	0.96	0.96		43.999167°N 73.159722°W
WCOR	Lebanon, Tennessee	129317	C	1	1		36.207222°N 86.2675°W
WCSS	Amsterdam, New York	23456	C			1	42.961111°N 74.176389°W
WCSV	Crossville, Tennessee	58781	C			1	35.950278°N 85.035833°W
WCVA	Culpeper, Virginia	14711	C			0.68	38.484444°N 77.989444°W
WDAN	Danville, Illinois	48330	C			1	40.149444°N 87.626389°W
WDBQ	Dubuque, Iowa	12705	C			1	42.502778°N 90.706667°W
WDEP	Ponce, Puerto Rico	74456	B	5.8	1		17.984167°N 66.636667°W
WDLC	Port Jervis, New York	53035	C			1	41.363611°N 74.678056°W
WDUR	Durham, North Carolina	36943	C	1	1		35.967778°N 78.888056°W
WEMJ	Laconia, New Hampshire	67270	C			1	43.541389°N 71.4625°W
WERE	Cleveland Heights, Ohio	74472	C	1	1		41.513333°N 81.601389°W
WESB	Bradford, Pennsylvania	54827	C			1	41.965°N 78.616944°W
WEUR	Oak Park, Illinois	1093	C			1	41.881111°N 87.793889°W
WFXY	Middlesboro, Kentucky	14070	C	1	1		36.612778°N 83.709167°W
WFZX	Anniston, Alabama	2311	C			1	33.6875°N 85.830278°W
WGCD	Chester, South Carolina	10761	C	0.65	0.65		34.698056°N 81.201944°W
WGCH	Greenwich, Connecticut	65674	C			1	41.026944°N 73.633056°W
WGEZ	Beloit, Wisconsin	24995	C	1	1		42.495556°N 89.018889°W
WGMA	Hazleton, Pennsylvania	132	C			1	40.94°N 75.967778°W
WHBB	Selma, Alabama	27454	C			1	32.433889°N 87.011111°W
WHOC	Philadelphia, Mississippi	72308	C			1	32.764444°N 89.13°W
WICY	Malone, New York	36122	C			1	44.846111°N 74.268611°W
WIEZ	Decatur, Alabama	70707	C			1	34.587222°N 86.986944°W
WIGM	Medford, Wisconsin	70517	C	1	1		45.164167°N 90.341111°W
WIKE	Newport, Vermont	49400	C	1	1		44.938889°N 72.222222°W
WITA	Knoxville, Tennessee	73076	C			1	35.969722°N 83.965556°W
WJJM	Lewisburg, Tennessee	40476	C	1	1		35.450833°N 86.7825°W
WJOC	Chattanooga, Tennessee	31861	C			1	35.051944°N 85.273333°W
WKBV	Richmond, Indiana	41848	C			1	39.828056°N 84.9325°W
WKDR	Berlin, New Hampshire	160163	C	1	0.93		44.482778°N 71.177222°W
WKNY	Kingston, New York	10782	C			1	41.936389°N 74.008333°W
WKRO	Cairo, Illinois	57415	C			1	37.043333°N 89.183889°W
WKUN	Monroe, Georgia	12816	C	1	1		33.810278°N 83.700278°W
WKYW	Frankfort, Kentucky	74609	C	1	1		38.203333°N 84.913611°W
WLCX	La Crosse, Wisconsin	7056	C			1	43.828333°N 91.240833°W
WLOE	Eden, North Carolina	40793	C			1	36.505833°N 79.771667°W
WMBM	Miami Beach, Florida	40045	C			1	25.769444°N 80.136389°W
WMGW	Meadville, Pennsylvania	24942	C			1	41.631389°N 80.176944°W
WMOA	Marietta, Ohio	54265	C	1	1		39.419167°N 81.476389°W
WMPX	Midland, Michigan	39673	C	0.98	0.98		43.614722°N 84.220833°W
WMRC	Milford, Massachusetts	21584	C			1	42.136667°N 71.513889°W
WMRN	Marion, Ohio	40169	C	1	1		40.613889°N 83.129722°W
WNDA	Wellsboro, Pennsylvania	21199	C			1	41.744722°N 77.293056°W
WNGZ	Watkins Glen, New York	49446	C	0.88	0.88		42.352222°N 76.868333°W
WNTJ	Johnstown, Pennsylvania	15327	C			1	40.323611°N 78.896944°W
WOHI	East Liverpool, Ohio	13710	C			1	40.629722°N 80.6025°W
WOLF	Syracuse, New York	73380	C	1	1		43.058333°N 76.166667°W
WOMI	Owensboro, Kentucky	67777	C			0.83	37.741389°N 87.116111°W
WOPI	Bristol, Virginia	31405	C			1	36.595833°N 82.161667°W
WOSH	Oshkosh, Wisconsin	69780	C	1	1		44.045833°N 88.529167°W
WPAK	Farmville, Virginia	24456	C			1	37.313056°N 78.394722°W
WPCI	Greenville, South Carolina	51487	C	1	1		34.908333°N 82.344722°W
WRKY	Lancaster, Pennsylvania	25870	C			0.6	40.060556°N 76.316389°W
WRLA	West Point, Georgia	57880	C			1	32.873889°N 85.192222°W
WRLF	Fairmont, West Virginia	20461	C			1	39.471944°N 80.140556°W
WRMT	Rocky Mount, North Carolina	73962	C			1	35.9325°N 77.830278°W
WSFB	Quitman, Georgia	54347	C			1	30.780833°N 83.575°W
WSGB	Sutton, West Virginia	41889	C	0.9	0.9		38.653056°N 80.719444°W
WSIP	Paintsville, Kentucky	58403	C			1	37.805833°N 82.766944°W
WSIR	Winter Haven, Florida	72683	C			1	28.013889°N 81.750556°W
WSNT	Sandersville, Georgia	54887	C			1	32.973056°N 82.809444°W
WSPR	West Springfield, Massachusetts	60390	C			0.47	42.098611°N 72.629167°W
WSTP	Salisbury, North Carolina	74075	C			0.6	35.688333°N 80.495556°W
WSVM	Valdese, North Carolina	32392	C			1	35.734167°N 81.567778°W
WSWW	Charleston, West Virginia	19534	C			1	38.357778°N 81.616667°W
WTIQ	Manistique, Michigan	73992	C			1	45.964167°N 86.276944°W
WTJV	DeLand, Florida	25123	C	1	1		29.018056°N 81.299722°W
WTKE	Milton, Florida	20498	C			1	30.625°N 87.048333°W
WTQS	Cameron, South Carolina	160804	C	1	1		33.5525°N 80.743889°W
WTTB	Vero Beach, Florida	58947	C			1	27.62°N 80.416944°W
WTUP	Tupelo, Mississippi	68353	C	1	1		34.255°N 88.69°W
WUVR	Lebanon, New Hampshire	129862	C	0.64	0.64		43.653333°N 72.237778°W
WVBG	Vicksburg, Mississippi	31585	C	1	1		32.345556°N 90.867222°W
WVGB	Beaufort, South Carolina	70408	C	0.5	1		32.435556°N 80.698333°W
WWNB	New Bern, North Carolina	14672	C			1	35.133056°N 77.065556°W
WWPR	Bradenton, Florida	60587	C	0.8	0.8		27.476667°N 82.535833°W
WXTG	Hampton, Virginia	25917	C	0.97	0.97		37.030556°N 76.375556°W
WYYZ	Jasper, Georgia	46480	C			1	34.475556°N 84.436944°W
WZOE	Princeton, Illinois	74289	C			1	41.352222°N 89.468056°W
