= List of AM radio stations in the United States by call sign (initial letters KN–KS) =

This is a list of AM radio stations in the United States having call signs beginning with the letters KN to KS.

== KN-- ==
Callsign	Frequency	City of license
KNAB	1140 AM	Burlington, Colorado
KNAF	910 AM	Fredericksburg, Texas
KNAI	860 AM	Phoenix, Arizona
KNAK	540 AM	Delta, Utah
KNAM	1490 AM	Silt, Colorado
KNBL	1260 AM	Idaho Falls, Idaho
KNBR	680 AM	San Francisco, California
KNBY	1280 AM	Newport, Arkansas
KNCB	1320 AM	Vivian, Louisiana
KNCK	1390 AM	Concordia, Kansas
KNCO	830 AM	Grass Valley, California
KNCY	1600 AM	Nebraska City, Nebraska
KNDC	1490 AM	Hettinger, North Dakota
KNDI	1270 AM	Honolulu, Hawaii
KNDK	1080 AM	Langdon, North Dakota
KNDN	960 AM	Farmington, New Mexico
KNDY	1570 AM	Marysville, Kansas
KNEA	970 AM	Jonesboro, Arkansas
KNEB	960 AM	Scottsbluff, Nebraska
KNED	1150 AM	McAlester, Oklahoma
KNEK	1190 AM	Washington, Louisiana
KNEL	1490 AM	Brady, Texas
KNEM	1240 AM	Nevada, Missouri
KNET	1450 AM	Palestine, Texas
KNEU	1250 AM	Roosevelt, Utah
KNEW	960 AM	Oakland, California
KNFL	740 AM	Fargo, North Dakota
KNFT	950 AM	Bayard, New Mexico
KNGN	1360 AM	McCook, Nebraska
KNGO	1480 AM	Dallas, Texas
KNHD	1450 AM	Camden, Arkansas
KNIA	1320 AM	Knoxville, Iowa
KNIH	970 AM	Paradise, Nevada
KNIM	1580 AM	Maryville, Missouri
KNIR	1360 AM	New Iberia, Louisiana
KNIT	1320 AM	Salt Lake City, Utah
KNLV	1060 AM	Ord, Nebraska
KNML	610 AM	Albuquerque, New Mexico
KNMM	1150 AM	Albuquerque, New Mexico
KNMX	540 AM	Las Vegas, New Mexico
KNND	1400 AM	Cottage Grove, Oregon
KNNR	1400 AM	Sparks, Nevada
KNOC	1450 AM	Natchitoches, Louisiana
KNOM	780 AM	Nome, Alaska
KNOT	1450 AM	Prescott, Arizona
KNOX	1310 AM	Grand Forks, North Dakota
KNPT	1310 AM	Newport, Oregon
KNRO	1400 AM	Redding, California
KNRS	570 AM	Salt Lake City, Utah
KNRV	1150 AM	Englewood, Colorado
KNSA	930 AM	Unalakleet, Alaska
KNSI	1450 AM	St. Cloud, Minnesota
KNSN	1240 AM	San Diego, California
KNSP	1430 AM	Staples, Minnesota
KNSS	1330 AM	Wichita, Kansas
KNST	790 AM	Tucson, Arizona
KNTB	1480 AM	Lakewood, Washington
KNTH	1070 AM	Houston, Texas
KNTR	980 AM	Lake Havasu City, Arizona
KNTS	1680 AM	Seattle, Washington
KNTX	1410 AM	Bowie, Texas
KNUI	550 AM	Wailuku, Hawaii
KNUJ	860 AM	New Ulm, Minnesota
KNUS	710 AM	Denver, Colorado
KNUV	1190 AM	Tolleson, Arizona
KNWA	1600 AM	Bellefonte, Arkansas
KNWC	1270 AM	Sioux Falls, South Dakota
KNWH	1250 AM	Yucca Valley, California
KNWN	1000 AM	Seattle, Washington
KNWQ	1140 AM	Palm Springs, California
KNWS	1090 AM	Waterloo, Iowa
KNWZ	970 AM	Coachella, California
KNX	1070 AM	Los Angeles
KNXN	1470 AM	Sierra Vista, Arizona
KNZR	1560 AM	Bakersfield, California
KNZZ	1100 AM	Grand Junction, Colorado

== KO-- ==
Callsign	Frequency	City of license
KOA	850 AM	Denver, Colorado
KOAC	550 AM	Corvallis, Oregon
KOAK	1080 AM	Red Oak, Iowa
KOAL	750 AM	Price, Utah
KOAN	1080 AM	Anchorage, Alaska
KOAZ	1510 AM	Isleta, New Mexico
KOBB	1230 AM	Bozeman, Montana
KOBE	1450 AM	Las Cruces, New Mexico
KOBO	1450 AM	Yuba City, California
KODI	1400 AM	Cody, Wyoming
KODL	1440 AM	The Dalles, Oregon
KODY	1240 AM	North Platte, Nebraska
KOEL	950 AM	Oelwein, Iowa
KOFA	1320 AM	Yuma, Arizona
KOFE	1240 AM	St. Maries, Idaho
KOFI	1180 AM	Kalispell, Montana
KOFO	1220 AM	Ottawa, Kansas
KOGA	930 AM	Ogallala, Nebraska
KOGN	1490 AM	Ogden, Utah
KOGO	600 AM	San Diego, California
KOHI	1600 AM	St. Helens, Oregon
KOHU	1360 AM	Hermiston, Oregon
KOIL	1290 AM	Omaha, Nebraska
KOJM	610 AM	Havre, Montana
KOKA	980 AM	Shreveport, Louisiana
KOKB	1580 AM	Blackwell, Oklahoma
KOKC	1520 AM	Oklahoma City, Oklahoma
KOKE	1600 AM	Pflugerville, Texas
KOKK	1210 AM	Huron, South Dakota
KOKL	1240 AM	Okmulgee, Oklahoma
KOKO	1450 AM	Warrensburg, Missouri
KOKP	1020 AM	Perry, Oklahoma
KOKX	1310 AM	Keokuk, Iowa
KOLE	1340 AM	Port Arthur, Texas
KOLJ	1150 AM	Quanah, Texas
KOLM	1520 AM	Rochester, Minnesota
KOLT	690 AM	Terrytown, Nebraska
KOLY	1300 AM	Mobridge, South Dakota
KOMW	680 AM	Omak, Washington
KOMY	1340 AM	La Selva Beach, California
KONA	610 AM	Kennewick–Richland–Pasco, Washington
KONO	860 AM	San Antonio, Texas
KONP	1450 AM	Port Angeles, Washington
KOOQ	1410 AM	North Platte, Nebraska
KOOR	1010 AM	Milwaukie, Oregon
KOPB	1600 AM	Eugene, Oregon
KOPY	1070 AM	Alice, Texas
KORE	1050 AM	Springfield–Eugene, Oregon
KORN	1490 AM	Mitchell, South Dakota
KORT	1230 AM	Grangeville, Idaho
KOSE	860 AM	Wilson, Arkansas
KOSJ	1490 AM	Santa Barbara, California
KOSS	1380 AM	Lancaster, California
KOTA	1380 AM	Rapid City, South Dakota
KOTS	1230 AM	Deming, New Mexico
KOTV	1170 AM	Tulsa, Oklahoma
KOTZ	720 AM	Kotzebue, Alaska
KOUU	1290 AM	Pocatello, Idaho
KOVC	1490 AM	Valley City, North Dakota
KOVE	1330 AM	Lander, Wyoming
KOVO	960 AM	Provo, Utah
KOWB	1290 AM	Laramie, Wyoming
KOWL	1490 AM	South Lake Tahoe, California
KOXR	910 AM	Oxnard, California
KOY	1230 AM	Phoenix, Arizona
KOZE	950 AM	Lewiston, Idaho
KOZI	1230 AM	Chelan, Washington
KOZN	1620 AM	Bellevue, Nebraska
KOZY	1320 AM	Grand Rapids, Minnesota

== KP-- ==
Callsign	Frequency	City of license
KPAM	1640 AM	Lake Oswego, Oregon
KPAN	860 AM	Hereford, Texas
KPAY	1290 AM	Chico, California
KPBI	1250 AM	Fayetteville, Arkansas
KPDQ	800 AM	Portland, Oregon
KPEL	1420 AM	Lafayette, Louisiana
KPEN	840 AM	Kenai, Alaska
KPET	690 AM	Lamesa, Texas
KPGE	1340 AM	Page, Arizona
KPGM	1500 AM	Pawhuska, Oklahoma
KPHI	1130 AM	Honolulu, Hawaii
KPHN	1360 AM	El Dorado, Kansas
KPHX	1480 AM	Phoenix, Arizona
KPIR	1420 AM	Granbury, Texas
KPKE	1490 AM	Gunnison, Colorado
KPLS	1510 AM	Littleton, Colorado
KPLT	1490 AM	Paris, Texas
KPLY	630 AM	Reno, Nevada
KPMI	1300 AM	Bemidji, Minnesota
KPMO	1300 AM	Mendocino, California
KPNW	1120 AM	Eugene, Oregon
KPOC	1420 AM	Pocahontas, Arkansas
KPOD	1240 AM	Crescent City, California
KPOF	910 AM	Denver, Colorado
KPOJ	620 AM	Portland, Oregon
KPOK	1340 AM	Bowman, North Dakota
KPOW	1260 AM	Powell, Wyoming
KPPF	1040 AM	Monument, Colorado
KPQ	560 AM	Wenatchee, Washington
KPRC	950 AM	Houston, Texas
KPRK	1340 AM	Livingston, Montana
KPRL	1230 AM	Paso Robles, California
KPRM	870 AM	Park Rapids, Minnesota
KPRP	650 AM	Honolulu, Hawaii
KPRT	1590 AM	Kansas City, Missouri
KPRV	1280 AM	Poteau, Oklahoma
KPRZ	1210 AM	San Marcos–Poway, California
KPSF	1200 AM	Cathedral City, California
KPSZ	940 AM	Des Moines, Iowa
KPTR	1090 AM	Seattle, Washington
KPTY	1330 AM	Waterloo, Iowa
KPUA	670 AM	Hilo, Hawaii
KPUG	1170 AM	Bellingham, Washington
KPUR	1440 AM	Amarillo, Texas
KPWB	1140 AM	Piedmont, Missouri
KPWK	1350 AM	San Bernardino, California
KPXQ	1360 AM	Glendale, Arizona
KPYK	1570 AM	Terrell, Texas
KPYN	900 AM	Atlanta, Texas
KPYV	1340 AM	Oroville, California

== KQ-- ==
Callsign	Frequency	City of license
KQAM	1480 AM	Wichita, Kansas
KQAQ	970 AM	Austin, Minnesota
KQBU	920 AM	El Paso, Texas
KQCV	800 AM	Oklahoma City, Oklahoma
KQDE	1340 AM	Evergreen, Montana
KQDI	1450 AM	Great Falls, Montana
KQDJ	1400 AM	Jamestown, North Dakota
KQEN	1240 AM	Roseburg, Oregon
KQEQ	1210 AM	Fowler, California
KQFN	1580 AM	Tempe, Arizona
KQIS	1340 AM	Bethel Heights, Arkansas
KQKD	1380 AM	Redfield, South Dakota
KQLL	1280 AM	Henderson, Nevada
KQLX	890 AM	Lisbon, North Dakota
KQMG	1220 AM	Independence, Iowa
KQMS	1670 AM	Redding, California
KQNA	1130 AM	Prescott Valley, Arizona
KQNK	1530 AM	Norton, Kansas
KQNM	1550 AM	Albuquerque, New Mexico
KQNT	590 AM	Spokane, Washington
KQPN	730 AM	West Memphis, Arkansas
KQQB	1520 AM	Hallettsville, Texas
KQQQ	1150 AM	Pullman, Washington
KQRR	1130 AM	Mount Angel, Oregon
KQSC	1530 AM	Colorado Springs, Colorado
KQTE	1450 AM	Helendale, California
KQUE	980 AM	Rosenburg/Richmond, Texas
KQV	1410 AM	Pittsburgh, Pennsylvania
KQWB	1660 AM	West Fargo, North Dakota
KQYX	1450 AM	Galena, Kansas

== KR-- ==
Callsign	Frequency	City of license
KRAC	1370 AM	Red Bluff, California
KRAE	1480 AM	Cheyenne, Wyoming
KRAI	550 AM	Craig, Colorado
KRAL	1240 AM	Rawlins, Wyoming
KRAP	1350 AM	Washington, Missouri
KRBA	1340 AM	Lufkin, Texas
KRBT	1340 AM	Eveleth, Minnesota
KRCM	1380 AM	Shenandoah, Texas
KRCN	1060 AM	Longmont, Colorado
KRCO	690 AM	Prineville, Oregon
KRDM	1240 AM	Redmond, Oregon
KRDO	1240 AM	Colorado Springs, Colorado
KRDU	1130 AM	Dinuba, California
KRDY	1160 AM	San Antonio, Texas
KRDZ	1440 AM	Wray, Colorado
KREA	1540 AM	Honolulu, Hawaii
KREB	1190 AM	Bentonville/Bella Vista, Arkansas
KREF	1400 AM	Norman, Oklahoma
KREH	900 AM	Pecan Grove, Texas
KREI	800 AM	Farmington, Missouri
KREW	1400 AM	Plainview, Texas
KRFE	580 AM	Lubbock, Texas
KRFO	1390 AM	Owatonna, Minnesota
KRFS	1600 AM	Superior, Nebraska
KRGE	1290 AM	Weslaco, Texas
KRGI	1430 AM	Grand Island, Nebraska
KRGS	690 AM	Rifle, Colorado
KRHW	1520 AM	Sikeston, Missouri
KRIB	1490 AM	Mason City, Iowa
KRIO	910 AM	McAllen, Texas
KRIZ	1420 AM	Renton, Washington
KRJO	1680 AM	Monroe, Louisiana
KRJW	1240 AM	Altamont, Oregon
KRKC	1490 AM	King City, California
KRKE	1100 AM	Peralta, New Mexico
KRKK	1360 AM	Rock Springs, Wyoming
KRKO	1380 AM	Everett, Washington
KRKS	990 AM	Denver, Colorado
KRKY	930 AM	Granby, Colorado
KRLA	870 AM	Glendale, California
KRLC	1350 AM	Lewiston, Idaho
KRLD	1080 AM	Dallas, Texas
KRLL	1420 AM	California, Missouri
KRLN	1400 AM	Cañon City, Colorado
KRLV	920 AM	Las Vegas, Nevada
KRLW	1320 AM	Walnut Ridge, Arkansas
KRMD	1340 AM	Shreveport, Louisiana
KRMG	740 AM	Tulsa, Oklahoma
KRML	1410 AM	Carmel, California
KRMO	990 AM	Cassville, Missouri
KRMP	1140 AM	Oklahoma City, Oklahoma
KRMS	1150 AM	Osage Beach, Missouri
KRNI	1010 AM	Mason City, Iowa
KRNT	1350 AM	Des Moines, Iowa
KROB	1510 AM	Robstown, Texas
KROC	1340 AM	Rochester, Minnesota
KROD	600 AM	El Paso, Texas
KROE	930 AM	Sheridan, Wyoming
KROF	960 AM	Abbeville, Louisiana
KROL	1430 AM	Carrollton, Missouri
KROP	1300 AM	Brawley, California
KROS	1340 AM	Clinton, Iowa
KROX	1260 AM	Crookston, Minnesota
KROY	1410 AM	San Saba, Texas
KRPA	1110 AM	Oak Harbor, Washington
KRPI	1550 AM	Ferndale, Washington
KRPL	1400 AM	Moscow, Idaho
KRPU	1210 AM	Rocklin, California
KRRP	950 AM	Coushatta, Louisiana
KRRS	1460 AM	Santa Rosa, California
KRRZ	1390 AM	Minot, North Dakota
KRSC	1400 AM	Othello, Washington
KRSK	1080 AM	Portland, Oregon
KRSL	990 AM	Russell, Kansas
KRSV	1210 AM	Afton, Wyoming
KRSY	1230 AM	Alamogordo, New Mexico
KRTA	610 AM	Medford, Oregon
KRTN	1490 AM	Raton, New Mexico
KRUI	1490 AM	Ruidoso Downs, New Mexico
KRUN	1400 AM	Ballinger, Texas
KRUS	1490 AM	Ruston, Louisiana
KRVA	1600 AM	Cockrell Hill, Texas
KRVM	1280 AM	Eugene, Oregon
KRVN	880 AM	Lexington, Nebraska
KRVZ	1400 AM	Springerville, Arizona
KRWB	1410 AM	Roseau, Minnesota
KRWC	1360 AM	Buffalo, Minnesota
KRXA	540 AM	Carmel Valley, California
KRXK	1230 AM	Rexburg, Idaho
KRXO	1270 AM	Claremore, Oklahoma
KRXR	1480 AM	Gooding, Idaho
KRYN	1230 AM	Gresham, Oregon
KRZD	1550 AM	Springfield, Missouri
KRZE	1280 AM	Farmington, New Mexico
KRZI	1660 AM	Waco, Texas
KRZR	1400 AM	Visalia, California
KRZY	1450 AM	Albuquerque, New Mexico

== KS-- ==
Callsign	Frequency	City of license
KSAC	890 AM	Olivehurst, California
KSAH	720 AM	Universal City, Texas
KSAL	1150 AM	Salina, Kansas
KSAZ	580 AM	Marana, Arizona
KSBN	1230 AM	Spokane, Washington
KSBQ	1480 AM	Santa Maria, California
KSCB	1270 AM	Liberal, Kansas
KSCJ	1360 AM	Sioux City, Iowa
KSCO	1080 AM	Santa Cruz, California
KSDN	930 AM	Aberdeen, South Dakota
KSDO	1130 AM	San Diego, California
KSDP	830 AM	Sand Point, Alaska
KSDR	1480 AM	Watertown, South Dakota
KSEI	930 AM	Pocatello, Idaho
KSEK	1340 AM	Pittsburg, Kansas
KSEL	1450 AM	Portales, New Mexico
KSEN	1150 AM	Shelby, Montana
KSEO	750 AM	Durant, Oklahoma
KSEV	700 AM	Tomball, Texas
KSEW	950 AM	Seward, Alaska
KSEY	1230 AM	Seymour, Texas
KSFA	860 AM	Nacogdoches, Texas
KSFB	1260 AM	San Francisco, California
KSFN	1510 AM	Piedmont, California
KSFO	810 AM	San Francisco, California
KSFX	1230 AM	Roswell, New Mexico
KSGF	1260 AM	Springfield, Missouri
KSGL	900 AM	Wichita, Kansas
KSGM	980 AM	Chester, Illinois
KSGO	1450 AM	St. George, Utah
KSGT	1340 AM	Jackson, Wyoming
KSHJ	1430 AM	Houston, Texas
KSHO	920 AM	Lebanon, Oregon
KSHP	1400 AM	North Las Vegas, Nevada
KSIB	1520 AM	Creston, Iowa
KSID	1340 AM	Sidney, Nebraska
KSIG	1450 AM	Crowley, Louisiana
KSIM	1400 AM	Sikeston, Missouri
KSIR	1010 AM	Brush, Colorado
KSIS	1050 AM	Sedalia, Missouri
KSIV	1320 AM	Clayton, Missouri
KSIW	1450 AM	Woodward, Oklahoma
KSIX	1230 AM	Corpus Christi, Texas
KSJB	600 AM	Jamestown, North Dakota
KSJK	1230 AM	Talent, Oregon
KSJX	1500 AM	San Jose, California
KSKK	1070 AM	Verndale, Minnesota
KSKR	1490 AM	Roseburg, Oregon
KSKY	660 AM	Balch Springs, Texas
KSL	1160 AM	Salt Lake City, Utah
KSLD	1140 AM	Soldotna, Alaska
KSLI	1280 AM	Abilene, Texas
KSLL	1080 AM	Price, Utah
KSLM	1220 AM	Salem, Oregon
KSLO	1230 AM	Opelousas, Louisiana
KSLR	630 AM	San Antonio, Texas
KSMA	1240 AM	Santa Maria, California
KSMD	1300 AM	Searcy, Arkansas
KSMH	1620 AM	West Sacramento, California
KSML	1260 AM	Diboll, Texas
KSMM	1470 AM	Liberal, Kansas
KSMO	1340 AM	Salem, Missouri
KSNY	1450 AM	Snyder, Texas
KSOK	1280 AM	Arkansas City, Kansas
KSOO	1000 AM	Sioux Falls, South Dakota
KSOP	1370 AM	South Salt Lake, Utah
KSOU	1090 AM	Sioux Center, Iowa
KSOX	1240 AM	Raymondville, Texas
KSPA	1510 AM	Ontario, California
KSPD	790 AM	Boise, Idaho
KSPI	780 AM	Stillwater, Oklahoma
KSPN	710 AM	Los Angeles
KSPO	1050 AM	Dishman, Washington
KSPT	1400 AM	Sandpoint, Idaho
KSPZ	980 AM	Ammon, Idaho
KSRA	960 AM	Salmon, Idaho
KSRM	920 AM	Soldotna, Alaska
KSRO	1350 AM	Santa Rosa, California
KSSK	590 AM	Honolulu, Hawaii
KSST	1230 AM	Sulphur Springs, Texas
KSTA	1000 AM	Coleman, Texas
KSTC	1230 AM	Sterling, Colorado
KSTE	650 AM	Rancho Cordova, California
KSTL	690 AM	St. Louis, Missouri
KSTN	1420 AM	Stockton, California
KSTP	1500 AM	St. Paul, Minnesota
KSTV	1510 AM	Stephenville, Texas
KSUB	590 AM	Cedar City, Utah
KSUE	1240 AM	Susanville, California
KSUH	1450 AM	Puyallup, Washington
KSUM	1370 AM	Fairmont, Minnesota
KSUN	1400 AM	Phoenix, Arizona
KSVA	920 AM	Albuquerque, New Mexico
KSVC	980 AM	Richfield, Utah
KSVE	1650 AM	El Paso, Texas
KSVN	730 AM	Ogden, Utah
KSVP	990 AM	Artesia, New Mexico
KSWB	840 AM	Seaside, Oregon
KSWM	940 AM	Aurora, Missouri
KSWV	810 AM	Santa Fe, New Mexico
KSYB	1300 AM	Shreveport, Louisiana
KSYC	1490 AM	Yreka, California
KSYL	970 AM	Alexandria, Louisiana
KSZL	1230 AM	Barstow, California

== See also ==
- North American call sign
