= 1280 AM =

AM radio frequency

The following radio stations broadcast on AM frequency 1280 kHz: 1280 AM is a regional North American broadcast frequency.

== In Argentina ==
- LU11 in Trenque Lauquen, Buenos Aires

== In Canada ==
Call sign	City of license	Daytime power (kW)	Nighttime power (kW)	Transmitter coordinates
CBPP-1	Prince Edward Island National Park, Prince Edward Island	0.02	0.02	46.4864°N 63.3136°W
CBQG	Wrigley, Northwest Territories	0.04	0.04	63.2172°N 123.44°W
CFMB	Montreal, Quebec	50	50	45.3253°N 73.5481°W

== In Mexico ==
- XEAW-AM in Monterrey, Nuevo León
- XECSAB-AM in Patzcuaro, Michoacan
- XECSAJ-AM in Tamazunchale, San Luis Potosi
- XESMA-AM in San Miguel de Allende, Guanajuato
- XETUT-AM in Tula, Tamaulipas

== In the United States ==
Call sign	City of license	Facility ID	Class	Daytime power (kW)	Nighttime power (kW)	Unlimited power (kW)	Transmitter coordinates
KBNO	Denver, Colorado	59956	B			5	39.601389°N 104.98°W
KCNI	Broken Bow, Nebraska	14766	D	1			41.408611°N 99.674444°W
KCOB	Newton, Iowa	9900	D	0.73	0.019		41.736389°N 93.02°W
KFRN	Long Beach, California	21005	B	0.43	0.237		33.798333°N 118.246389°W
KIT	Yakima, Washington	64398	B	4.5	0.81		46.571944°N 120.494722°W
KLDY	Lacey, Washington	3711	B	1	0.5		47.062222°N 122.830278°W
KNBY	Newport, Arkansas	48750	D	1	0.088		35.610556°N 91.250556°W
KPRV	Poteau, Oklahoma	37089	D	1	0.108		35.015278°N 94.651667°W
KQLL	Henderson, Nevada	58317	D	5	0.028		36.210833°N 115.163056°W
KRVM	Eugene, Oregon	54009	B	5	1.5		44.100833°N 123.051667°W
KRZE	Farmington, New Mexico	29518	D	5	0.095		36.8175°N 108.096389°W
KSLI	Abilene, Texas	54843	B	0.5	0.226		32.441667°N 99.718889°W
KSOK	Arkansas City, Kansas	14238	D	1	0.1		37.086111°N 97.032778°W
KVXR	Moorhead, Minnesota	35863	B	5	1		46.819444°N 96.765556°W
KWHI	Brenham, Texas	67300	D	1	0.072		30.168056°N 96.422222°W
KWSX	Stockton, California	32214	B	1	1		37.982778°N 121.229444°W (daytime); 37.981944°N 121.228889°W (nighttime)
KXEG	Phoenix, Arizona	10975	D	2.5	0.049		33.493333°N 112.138333°W
KXTK	Arroyo Grande, California	36026	B	10	2.5		35.145556°N 120.520833°W
KYRO	Troy, Missouri	59251	D	0.66	0.045		39.053611°N 90.996389°W
KZFS	Spokane, Washington	53149	D	5	0.125		47.6075°N 117.361111°W
KZNS	Salt Lake City, Utah	60458	B	50	0.67		40.851944°N 111.968611°W (daytime); 40.851944°N 111.968056°W (nighttime)
WADO	New York, New York	70684	B	50	7.2		40.826667°N 74.075556°W
WALI	Dayton, Tennessee	70783	D	1	0.31		35.47°N 85.0375°W
WBIG	Aurora, Illinois	5217	B	1	0.5		41.769444°N 88.245556°W
WBWX	Berwick, Pennsylvania	27001	D	1	0.164		41.076667°N 76.258889°W
WCMN	Arecibo, Puerto Rico	8792	B	5	1		18.481111°N 66.687778°W
WFYC	Alma, Michigan	60786	D	1	0.056		43.368889°N 84.605278°W
WGBF	Evansville, Indiana	660	B	5	1		37.995833°N 87.476667°W
WHTK	Rochester, New York	37549	B	5	5		43.098333°N 77.583611°W
WHTP	Gardiner, Maine	68296	D	0.25	0.04		44.248889°N 69.813889°W
WHVR	Hanover, Pennsylvania	54607	B	5	0.5		39.819722°N 77.006944°W
WIHB	Macon, Georgia	41989	D	5	0.099		32.804444°N 83.604444°W
WIPC	Lake Wales, Florida	59616	D	1	0.15		27.925°N 81.604444°W
WJAY	Mullins, South Carolina	66139	B	4.2	0.27		34.191667°N 79.315278°W
WMCP	Columbia, Tennessee	40740	B	5	0.5		35.618889°N 86.981111°W
WMXB	Tuscaloosa, Alabama	68420	B	5	0.5		33.218611°N 87.568056°W
WODT	New Orleans, Louisiana	11947	B			5	29.895278°N 90.004444°W
WONW	Defiance, Ohio	40710	B	1	0.5		41.278889°N 84.397222°W
WPKZ	Fitchburg, Massachusetts	71434	B	5	1		42.594444°N 71.836667°W
WSAT	Salisbury, North Carolina	43140	D	0.85	0.13		35.679167°N 80.506944°W
WSUX	Seaford, Delaware	4339	B	0.84	0.211		38.613056°N 75.586667°W
WTMY	Sarasota, Florida	51440	D	0.3	0.1		27.336389°N 82.573611°W
WUZZ	New Castle, Pennsylvania	24997	B	4.9	1		40.953889°N 80.318056°W
WWTC	Minneapolis, Minnesota	9676	B	10	15		44.788333°N 93.215°W
WYAL	Scotland Neck, North Carolina	74223	D	5			36.135833°N 77.435833°W
WYVE	Wytheville, Virginia	59686	D	2.5	0.164		36.965°N 81.080556°W
WZXI	Lancaster, Kentucky	36476	D	1	0.088		37.632222°N 84.567222°W
