= GBA (disambiguation) =

The Game Boy Advance (GBA) is a 2001 handheld video game system developed by Nintendo.

GBA may also refer to:

== Science and technology ==
- Generalized Büchi automaton, in automata theory, a variant of Büchi automaton
- Generic Bootstrapping Architecture, a cryptographic technology that enables the authentication of a user
- Glucocerebrosidase, a human enzyme
- GBA2, a gene which encodes for cytosolic beta-glucosidase
- GBA3, a gene which encodes for cytosolic beta-glucosidase
- Gut–brain axis, biochemical signaling between the gastrointestinal tract and the central nervous system

== Organizations ==
- Federal Joint Committee (Germany) (Gemeinsamer Bundesausschuss), a public health decision-making body in Germany
- Geologische Bundesanstalt, the geological survey of Austria
- Ghana Bar Association, a professional association in Ghana
- Giving Back to Africa, a Bloomington, Indiana non-profit organization
- Global Banking Alliance for Women, a non-profit organization concentrating on women's wealth
- Global Biofuel Alliance, an international organization for regulation, research and promotion for biofuel
- Golaghat Bar Association, a voluntary bar association in India
- Governing Bodies Association, an organisation of governing bodies of independent schools in the UK
- Greater Bengaluru Authority, an apex coordinating body for municipal corporations of the Indian city of Bengaluru
- Gute Bücher für Alle, a German charity which operates floating bookshops
- Public Prosecutor General (Germany) (Generalbundesanwalt, GBA)

== Companies ==
- Cahaba Government Benefit Administrators, subsidiary of Blue Cross and Blue Shield of Alabama
- Gramin Bank of Aryavart, a Regional Rural Bank in Uttar Pradesh, India
- Greater Bay Airlines, a low-cost carrier based in Hong Kong, China
- Greenbrier Academy for Girls, a therapeutic college preparatory boarding school in Pence Springs, West Virginia
- Groen Brothers Aviation, now Skyworks Global, an American autogyro research and development company
- KGBA (AM), a radio station (1490 AM) in Calexico, California, United States
- KGBA-FM, a radio station (100.1 FM) in Holtville, California, United States
- WGBA-TV, a television station in Green Bay, Wisconsin

== People ==
- G. B. A. Coker, a former Judge of the Nigerian Supreme Court

== Geography ==
- Alderney, international vehicle country code (Great Britain: Alderney)
- Greater Buenos Aires, the urban agglomeration comprising the autonomous city of Buenos Aires and the adjacent 24 partidos
- Cotswold Airport in the United Kingdom, IATA airport code
- Guangdong–Hong Kong–Macao Greater Bay Area, often simply referred to as the Greater Bay Area
- Guangzhou Baiyun railway station, China, station code

== Music ==
- "G.B.A.", a song on Solace (Xavier Rudd album)
- God Bless America, American patriotic song written by Irving Berlin

== Sports ==
- Geelong Baseball Association, an Australian baseball association and league
- Global Basketball Association, minor league in the United States in the early 1990s
- Guam Basketball Association, Guam's professional basketball league

== Process ==
- Gender-based Analysis, a management process to explore the changing realities and inequalities based on gender

== Other uses ==
- Game Boy Advance SP, a redesign of the Game Boy Advance, released in 2003
- Golden Bell Awards, an annual award ceremony for television and broadcast in Taiwan
