= KWRZ =

Simulcasting KSKR Roseburg
- Canyonville, Oregon; United States
- Frequency: 92.3 MHz
- Branding: The Score

Programming
- Format: Sports
- Affiliations: Infinity Sports Network; Oregon State Beavers; Portland Trail Blazers; Sports USA Radio Network

Ownership
- Owner: Brooke Communications, Inc.
- Sister stations: KKMX, KQEN, KRSB, KSKR, KSKR-FM

History
- First air date: 1990 (as KSDC at 92.1)
- Former call signs: KSDC (1990–1993); KAVE (1993–2006); KMKR (2006–2013)
- Former frequencies: 92.1 MHz (1990–2013)

Technical information
- Licensing authority: FCC
- Facility ID: 59346
- Class: C3
- ERP: 850 watts
- HAAT: 439 meters (1,440 ft)
- Transmitter coordinates: 43°0′13″N 123°21′27″W

Links
- Public license information: Public file; LMS
- Webcast: Listen Live
- Website: 1490thescore.com

KWRZ (92.3 FM) is a radio station licensed to Canyonville, Oregon, United States. The station is owned by Brooke Communications.

On December 5, 2019, KWRZ changed their format from classical to a simulcast of sports-formatted KSKR 1490 AM Roseburg, after the University of Oregon sold it to Brooke Communications for $25,000.
