= KXYL =

KXYL may refer to:

- KXYL (AM), a radio station (1240 AM) licensed to Brownwood, Texas, United States
- KXYL-FM, a radio station (102.3 FM) licensed to Coleman, Texas
- KQBZ, a radio station (96.9 FM) licensed to Brownwood, Texas, which held the call sign KXYL-FM from 1982 to 1985 and from 1991 to 2010
