= KGBA =

KGBA may refer to:

- KGBA (AM), a radio station (1490 AM) licensed to Calexico, California, United States
- KGBA-FM, a radio station (100.1 FM) licensed to Holtville, California, United States
