= KSKR =

KSKR may refer to:

- KSKR (AM), a radio station (1490 AM) licensed to Roseburg, Oregon, United States
- KSKR-FM, a radio station (100.9 FM) licensed to Sutherlin, Oregon, United States
