= KVXX =

KVXX may refer to:

- KEGE, a radio station (101.7 FM) licensed to serve Hamilton City, California, United States, which held the call sign KVXX from 2013 to 2017
- KHEX, a radio station (100.3 FM) licensed to serve Concow, California, which held the call sign KVXX from 2010 to 2012
