= WSNT =

WSNT may refer to:

- WSNT (AM), a radio station (1490 AM) licensed to Sandersville, Georgia, United States
- WSNT-FM, a radio station (99.9 FM) licensed to Sandersville, Georgia, United States
