= KNEL =

KNEL may refer to:

- KNEL (AM), a radio station (1490 AM) licensed to Brady, Texas, United States
- KNEL-FM, a radio station (95.3 FM) licensed to Brady, Texas, United States
- the ICAO code for Naval Air Engineering Station Lakehurst
