= KZZE =

KZZE may refer to:

- KZZE-LP, a low-power radio station (96.5 FM) licensed to serve Fort Thompson, South Dakota, United States
- KMED (FM), a radio station (106.3 FM) licensed to serve Eagle Point, Oregon, United States, which held the call sign KZZE from 1994 to 2015
- KXYL (AM), a radio station (1240 AM) licensed to serve Brownwood, Texas, United States, which held the call sign KZZE from 1986 to 1989
- KPRV (AM), a radio station (1280 AM) licensed to serve Poteau, Oklahoma, United States, which held the call sign KZZE in 1986
- KZBB, a radio station (97.9 FM) licensed to serve Poteau, Oklahoma, which held the call sign KZZE or KZZE-FM from 1984 to 1986
