= KRTN =

KRTN may refer to:

- KRTN (AM), a radio station (1490 AM) licensed to Raton, New Mexico, United States
- KRTN-FM, a radio station (93.9 FM) licensed to Raton, New Mexico, United States
- Raton Municipal Airport in Raton, New Mexico, United States
- KRTN-TV Channel 33 TV station in Durango, Colorado
- KRTN-LD (channel 18, virtual 39), a low-powered television station in Albuquerque, New Mexico
- KRTN, the Indian Railways station code for Kirti Nagar railway station, Delhi, India
