= KSTA =

Coordinates: 31.8546°N 99.4268°W

- Coleman, Texas; United States
- Broadcast area: Coleman, Texas; Brownwood, Texas
- Frequency: 1000 kHz
- Branding: Country 1000

Programming
- Format: Country music

Ownership
- Owner: Tackett-Boazman Broadcasting LP
- Sister stations: KQBZ; KXYL; KXYL-FM

History
- First air date: November 1, 1947
- Last air date: April 29, 2026

Technical information
- Licensing authority: FCC
- Facility ID: 12238
- Class: D
- Power: 250 watts (days only)

Links
- Public license information: Public file; LMS
- Website: colemanradio.com

KSTA (1000 AM) was a radio station licensed to Coleman, Texas. The station aired a country music format and was owned by Tackett-Boazman Broadcasting LP.

The Federal Communications Commission cancelled the station’s license on April 28, 2026; it signed off the next day. Owner Rex Tackett attributed the closure to economic and technical issues, as well as the inability to find a buyer for KSTA; the shutdown coincided with the sale of sister stations KXYL and KXYL-FM.
