= KPRV =

KPRV may refer to:

- KPRV (AM), a radio station (1280 AM) licensed to Poteau, Oklahoma, United States
- KPRV-FM, a radio station (92.5 FM) licensed to Heavener, Oklahoma, United States
