= KYCT =

KYCT may refer to:

- KYCT (FM), a radio station (92.7 FM) licensed to serve Shasta Lake, California, United States
- KTTE, a defunct radio station (90.1 FM) formerly licensed to serve Humboldt, Nebraska, United States, which held the call sign KYCT in 2014
- KLXZ, a radio station (91.3 FM) licensed to serve Ruidoso, New Mexico, United States, which held the call sign KYCT from 2006 to 2013
