= KWMC =

KWMC may refer to:

- KWMC (AM), a radio station (1490 AM) licensed to Del Rio, Texas, United States
- Winnemucca Municipal Airport (ICAO code KWMC)
- Koyambedu Wholesale Market Complex
