= KHGQ =

KHGQ may refer to:

- KHGQ (FM), a radio station (101.7 FM) licensed to serve Shungnak, Alaska, United States
- KHEX, a radio station (100.3 FM) licensed to serve Concow, California, United States, which held the call sign KHGQ from 2003 to 2010
