= KCKS =

KCKS may refer to:

- Kansas City, Kansas, a core city of the Kansas City metropolitan area.
- KEGE (FM), a radio station (101.7 FM) licensed to serve Hamilton City, California, United States, which held the call sign KCKS from 2011 to 2013
