= Krea =

Krea or KREA may refer to:

- KREA, a commercial AM radio station in Honolulu, Hawaii.
- Krea University, an Indian university.
- Wissanu Krea-ngam (born 1951), a Thai jurist.
- Krea.ai, Inc., a company making generative artificial intelligence products.
