= WKYY =

WKYY may refer to:

- WKYY (FM), a radio station (99.1 FM) licensed to serve Beaver Dam, Kentucky, United States
- WZXI, a radio station (1280 AM) licensed to serve Lancaster, Kentucky, which held the call sign WKYY from 1984 to 2015
