= KRER =

KRER may refer to:

- KRER-LP, a low-power radio station (102.5
- FM) licensed to serve Emory, Texas, United States
- KEGE, a radio station (101.7 FM) licensed to serve Hamilton City, California, United States, which held the call sign KRER from 2005 to 2011
