= KLFJ =

KLFJ may refer to:

- KLFJ (FM), a radio station (105.3 FM) licensed to serve Hoxie, Arkansas, United States
- KBOB (AM), a radio station (1550 AM) licensed to serve Springfield, Missouri, United States, which held the call sign KLFJ from 1975 to 2016
