= KKMX =

- Tri City, Oregon; United States
- Broadcast area: Roseburg, Oregon
- Frequency: 104.3 MHz
- Branding: 104.5 Sam FM

Programming
- Format: Adult hits

Ownership
- Owner: Brooke Communications, Inc.
- Sister stations: KQEN, KRSB-FM, KSKR, KSKR-FM

History
- First air date: 1989 (as KTRQ-FM)
- Former call signs: KTRQ-FM (1988–1993)

Technical information
- Licensing authority: FCC
- Facility ID: 67650
- Class: C2
- ERP: 5,600 watts
- HAAT: 422 meters (1,385 ft)
- Transmitter coordinates: 43°0′13″N 123°21′26″W
- Translator: 104.5 K283AD (Roseburg)

Links
- Public license information: Public file; LMS
- Webcast: Listen Live
- Website: 1045samfmradio.com

KKMX (104.3 FM, "Sam FM") is a radio station broadcasting an adult hits music format. Licensed to Tri City, Oregon, United States, the station is currently owned by Brooke Communications, Inc.

== History ==
104.3 signed on the air in 1989 as “FM 104 KTRQ” with a pop music format featuring a wide variety of contemporary hits. In early 1991, 104.3 KTRQ briefly became a country music station, but went off the air by that summer.

In 1993, after being silent for two years, the station resurfaced as “the Hit Mix, 104.3 KKMX” with JRN's satellite-fed Hot AC format. In 1994, KKMX rebranded as “Soft Rock 104” as they added the translator at 104.5 in Roseburg. In early 1996, KKMX became “Mix 104” as it switched to ABC's Adult Contemporary format. In 1998, the station returned to a Hot AC format as “104-5 Kiss FM” with a focus on the frequency of the Roseburg translator. In 2007, KKMX stunted by playing Sammy Davis Jr. and then flipped to Adult Hits with the “104-5 Sam FM” branding.

== Translators ==
KKMX also broadcasts on the following translator:

Broadcast translator for KKMX
Call sign	Frequency	City of license	FID	ERP (W)	Class	FCC info
K283AD	104.5 FM	Roseburg, Oregon	67651	43	D	LMS
