= KGXX =

Coordinates: 40°26′36″N 120°38′35″W

- Susanville, California; United States
- Frequency: 100.7 MHz
- Branding: Double X Country

Programming
- Format: Country

Ownership
- Owner: Independence Rock Media Group; (Independence Rock Media, LLC)
- Sister stations: KAJK, KBLF, KEGE, KHEX, KIQS, KLZN, KRAC, KTOR

Technical information
- Licensing authority: FCC
- Facility ID: 183357
- Class: A
- ERP: 1,500 watts
- HAAT: −161 meters (−528 ft)

Links
- Public license information: Public file; LMS

KGXX is a radio station airing a country music format licensed to Susanville, California, broadcasting on 100.7 FM. The station is owned by Independence Rock Media Group, through licensee Independence Rock Media, LLC.
