= WIPC =

- Lake Wales, Florida; United States
- Broadcast area: Lakeland area
- Frequency: 1280 kHz
- Branding: Radio Esperanza 96.9 & 1280

Programming
- Format: Spanish Christian radio

Ownership
- Owner: Super W Media Group, Inc.

History
- First air date: July 1951; 74 years ago (as WIPC)
- Former call signs: WKZJ (1989-?)

Technical information
- Licensing authority: FCC
- Facility ID: 59616
- Class: B
- Power: 1,000 watts day 150 watts night
- Transmitter coordinates: 27°55′30.00″N 81°36′16.00″W
- Translator: 96.9 W245DO (Lake Wales)

Links
- Public license information: Public file; LMS
- Website: radioesperanza1280.com

WIPC (1280 AM) is a radio station broadcasting a Spanish Christian radio format. Licensed to Lake Wales, Florida, the station serves the Lakeland area. The station is currently owned by Super W Media Group, Inc. It uses the slogan, "La Señal Refrescante" or "The Refreshing Signal."

By day, WIPC broadcasts at 1,000 watts. But to avoid interference with other stations on 1280 AM, at night it reduces power to 150 watts. It uses a non-directional antenna at all times. Programming is also heard on 250-watt FM translator W245DO at 96.9 MHz in Lake Wales.

== History ==
The station signed on the air in July 1951 by the Imperial Polk Broadcasting Corporation. Its programming ranged from MOR to Top 40 by 1970, becoming Adult Contemporary and Beautiful Music in the 1980's. After a return to Adult Contemporary as WKZJ, on March 1, 1990, the station changed its call sign back to the original WIPC. By 2002, the station had changed to Spanish language programming.

Logo before translator sign on
