= KTOR =

- Gerber, California; United States
- Broadcast area: Red Bluff; Redding
- Frequency: 99.7 MHz
- Branding: Radio Mexicana

Programming
- Format: Regional Mexican

Ownership
- Owner: Independence Rock Media Group; (Independence Rock Media, LLC)
- Sister stations: KAJK, KBLF, KEGE, KGXX, KHEX, KIQS, KLZN, KRAC

History
- First air date: 2003
- Call sign meaning: Torch (previous format)

Technical information
- Licensing authority: FCC
- Facility ID: 82891
- Class: A
- ERP: 470 watts
- HAAT: 350 meters (1,150 ft)
- Transmitter coordinates: 40°15′31″N 122°5′24″W

Links
- Public license information: Public file; LMS
- Website: radiomexicana997.com

KTOR (99.7 FM) is a radio station broadcasting a regional Mexican format. Licensed to Gerber, California, United States, it serves the cities of Red Bluff, Redding, and Chico in Northern California.

The station is currently owned by Independence Rock Media Group, through licensee Independence Rock Media, LLC.
