= KLVT =

- Levelland, Texas; United States
- Broadcast area: West Texas
- Frequency: 1230 kHz

Programming
- Format: Talk
- Affiliations: Premiere Media Networks; Compass Media Networks; Salem Radio Network; Texas State Network; Texas Farm Bureau Radio Network; Westwood One

Ownership
- Owner: Tania Moody; (Cute Boots Broadcasting LLC)
- Sister stations: KZZN

History
- First air date: July 17, 1949
- Call sign meaning: Levelland, Texas

Technical information
- Licensing authority: FCC
- Facility ID: 30026
- Class: C
- Power: 1,000 watts unlimited
- Transmitter coordinates: 33°35′54″N 102°23′8″W

Links
- Public license information: Public file; LMS
- Webcast: Listen Live
- Website: www.klvtradio.com

KLVT Levelland 1230AM

KLVT Levelland (1230 AM) is a radio station broadcasting talk, agriculture, sports, and music formats licensed to Levelland, Texas, United States. The station is owned by Tania Moody, through licensee Cute Boots Broadcasting LLC, and features programming from Premiere Media Networks, Compass Media Networks, The American Ag Network, The All Ag Network, Texas Farm Bureau Radio, Salem Radio Network, Texas State Network, and Westwood One, as well as local sports and a local morning show.

== History ==
KLVT was first licensed to Forrest Weimhold who owned the Levelland newspaper. He and attorney Al Allison went to Washington and met with Texas Senator Lyndon Johnson who was a member of the relevant FCC committee.

Forrest sold the station in 1959 to Marshall Formby to raise money to purchase a 4-color printing press for the newspaper.

KLVT

== Programming ==
KLVT programming includes a local morning show, Good Morning Texas, as well as nationally syndicated talk-shows The Glenn Beck Program, The Scott Jennings Show, and more. Weekdays are bookended by Farm & Ranch blocks with Agriculture Today, The Agribusiness Report, Texas Ag Today, and Agriculture of America broadcasts. KLVT is also the home of Levelland Lobo, Ropes Eagle, Sundown Roughneck, and Whiteface Antelope athletics.
