= KIQS =

- Willows, California; United States
- Broadcast area: Chico, California
- Frequency: 1560 kHz
- Branding: La Ranchera 98.3 y 1560

Programming
- Format: Regional Mexican

Ownership
- Owner: Independence Rock Media Group; (Independence Rock Media, LLC)
- Sister stations: KAJK, KBLF, KEGE, KGXX, KHEX, KLZN, KRAC, KTOR

History
- First air date: 1962

Technical information
- Licensing authority: FCC
- Facility ID: 34941
- Class: D
- Power: 250 watts (days only)
- Transmitter coordinates: 39°31′43.6″N 122°10′12.9″W
- Translator: 98.3 K252FN (Willows)

Links
- Public license information: Public file; LMS
- Webcast: Listen live
- Website: radiomexicana997.com

KIQS (1560 AM) is a daytime-only radio station licensed to Willows, California, United States. The station is owned by Independence Rock Media Group. Previous owner Thomas F. Huth died in the summer of 2020. This station is rebroadcast on translator K252FN 98.3 FM and their format is Regional Mexican. Although it is a daytimer, the translator is authorized to broadcast around the clock.
