= KOSB =

Simulcasts KOKB Blackwell
- Perry, Oklahoma; United States
- Frequency: 105.1 MHz
- Branding: Triple Play Sports Radio

Programming
- Format: Sports
- Affiliations: Fox Sports Radio

Ownership
- Owner: Team Radio, L.L.C.

History
- First air date: November 24, 1988 (as KJFK)
- Former call signs: KJFK (1988–1993); KASR-FM (1993–1995); KVCS-FM (1995–1998)

Technical information
- Licensing authority: FCC
- Facility ID: 62348
- Class: A
- ERP: 6,000 watts
- HAAT: 100 meters (330 ft)
- Transmitter coordinates: 36°14′15″N 97°21′59″W

Links
- Public license information: Public file; LMS
- Webcast: Listen Live
- Website: tripleplaysportsradio.com

KOSB (105.1 FM) is a radio station licensed to Perry, Oklahoma, United States. The station is currently owned by Team Radio, L.L.C.

Logo before translator sign ons
