= XECJC-AM =

Radio station in Ciudad Juárez, Chihuahua

- Ciudad Juárez, Chihuahua; Mexico
- Frequency: 1490 AM
- Branding: Radio Net

Programming
- Format: Talk radio
- Affiliations: Imagen Informativa

Ownership
- Owner: Net Información Total Multimedia; (Radio Juarense, S.A. de C.V.)

History
- First air date: 1972
- Call sign meaning: Ciudad Juárez Chihuahua

Technical information
- Licensing authority: CRT
- Class: C
- Power: 1,000 watts days 750 watts nights

Links
- Webcast: Listen live
- Website: radionet.com.mx

XECJC-AM is a talk radio station in Ciudad Juárez, Chihuahua, Mexico. Broadcasting on 1490 AM, XECJC is known as Radio Net.

== History ==
Domingo Salayandia Nájera obtained the station's concession in 1972.
