= KAJK =

Coordinates: 40.443°N 120.644°W

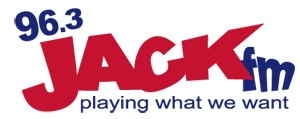
- Susanville, California; United States
- Frequency: 96.3 MHz
- Branding: 96.3 Jack FM

Programming
- Format: Adult hits

Ownership
- Owner: Independence Rock Media Group; (Independence Rock Media, LLC)
- Sister stations: KBLF, KEGE, KGXX, KHEX, KIQS, KLZN, KRAC, KTOR

History
- First air date: 2006 (as KLZN)
- Former call signs: KLZN (2005–2010)

Technical information
- Licensing authority: FCC
- Facility ID: 162465
- Class: A
- ERP: 1,500 watts
- HAAT: -161 meters

Links
- Public license information: Public file; LMS

KAJK (96.3 FM) is a radio station licensed to Susanville, California, United States. It serves Lassen County, California. The station is owned by Independence Rock Media Group, through licensee Independence Rock Media, LLC. That company is in turn partially owned by Gary Katz.
