= KSKR-FM =

- Sutherlin, Oregon; United States
- Broadcast area: Roseburg, Oregon
- Frequency: 100.9 MHz
- Branding: i101

Programming
- Format: Top 40 (CHR)
- Affiliations: Compass Media Networks; Premiere Networks

Ownership
- Owner: Brooke Communications, Inc.
- Sister stations: KKMX, KQEN, KRSB-FM, KSKR, KWRZ

History
- First air date: 1998 (as KAVJ at 101.1)
- Former call signs: KAVJ (1997–2008)
- Former frequencies: 101.1 MHz (1999–2013)
- Call sign meaning: K SKoRe ("Score", previous format)

Technical information
- Licensing authority: FCC
- Facility ID: 69657
- Class: C3
- ERP: 3,600 watts
- HAAT: 262 meters (860 feet)
- Transmitter coordinates: 43°22′19″N 123°21′15″W
- Translator: 100.7 K264BR (Roseburg)

Links
- Public license information: Public file; LMS
- Webcast: Listen Live
- Website: i101radio.com

KSKR-FM (100.9 MHz) is an American radio station licensed to serve Sutherlin, Oregon, United States. The station, which began broadcasting in 1998, is currently owned by Brooke Communications, Inc.

== Programming ==
KSKR-FM broadcasts a Top 40 (CHR) format branded as "¡101". During its time as a sports station, KSKR-FM carried high school football and other local sporting events as a member of the Table Rock Sports Network. KSKR-FM also aired University of Oregon Ducks football, baseball, and men's basketball as a member of the Oregon Sports Network. On Saturday Carson Daly and Local DJ The Grubes airs The iMix and Saturday nights the nationally syndicated show Most Requested Live is aired. Every Sunday, Weekends With Roula and Club Kane is aired. Weekday mornings has Nationally syndicated Brooke and Jeffery and the afternoon drive shift 3 p.m. to 7 p.m. is the Award Winning Afternoons with the World Renowned solo artist "Tory (Tory) Rose" and Christian (The Grubes) Gruber.

== History ==
This station received its original construction permit from the Federal Communications Commission on August 31, 1995. The new station was assigned the call letters KAVJ by the FCC on June 1, 1997. KAVJ received its license to cover from the FCC on February 25, 1999.

In August 2002, Valentine Coastal Communications, Inc. (Bernie Foster, owner) reached an agreement to sell this station to Brooke Communications, Inc. (Patrick Markham, president) for $650,000. The deal was approved by the FCC on October 21, 2002, and the transaction was consummated on December 16, 2002. At the time of the sale, the station broadcast an oldies music format branded as "101.1 Cool FM".

The oldies format persisted until 2008 when the station became a full-time affiliate of ESPN Radio branded as "The Score". The station was assigned the current KSKR-FM call sign by the Federal Communications Commission on June 7, 2008.

On October 1, 2011, KSKR-FM changed their format from sports (which continues on sister station KSKR (1490 AM in Roseburg, Oregon)) to contemporary hits, branded as "Jelli 101.1".

On December 13, 2013 KSKR-FM moved from 101.1 FM to 100.9 FM. The branding was modified to “Jelli 101” on the new frequency.

On June 26, 2014, Jelli announced it would shut down its radio platform on the 29th. That same day, KSKR-FM held an on-air funeral to sign off Jelli 101. Afterward, the station continued its CHR format, but without any imaging except for the top-of-the-hour station ID, which it ran until the following day at Noon, when it rebranded as i101, continuing to promote their music as being chosen (at least partly) online by listeners.
