= KNEL-FM =

Coordinates: 31.124°N 99.3597°W

- Brady, Texas; United States
- Frequency: 95.3 MHz
- Branding: 95.3 FM 1490 AM

Programming
- Format: Country

Ownership
- Owner: Farris Broadcasting, Inc.
- Sister stations: KNEL

History
- First air date: August 21, 1979

Technical information
- Licensing authority: FCC
- Facility ID: 59539
- Class: A
- ERP: 6,000 watts
- HAAT: 91 meters (299 ft)

Links
- Public license information: Public file; LMS
- Webcast: Listen live
- Website: knelradio.com

KNEL-FM 95.3 FM is a radio station licensed to Brady, Texas. The station broadcasts a country music format and is owned by Farris Broadcasting, Inc.
