= WSNT (AM) =

- Sandersville, Georgia; United States
- Frequency: 1490 kHz
- Branding: Real Country Waco 100

Programming
- Format: Country music (WSNT-FM simulcast)

Ownership
- Owner: Radio Station Wsnt, Inc.

History
- Former call signs: DWSNT (2005–2007)

Technical information
- Licensing authority: FCC
- Facility ID: 54887
- Class: C
- Power: 1,000 watts (unlimited)
- Transmitter coordinates: 32°58′26.60″N 82°48′13.30″W

Links
- Public license information: Public file; LMS
- Website: www.waco100fm.com

WSNT (1490 AM) is a radio station broadcasting a country music format. Licensed to Sandersville, Georgia, United States. The station is currently owned by Radio Station Wsnt, Inc.

== History ==
The station went on the air as DWSNT on March 17, 2005. On January 31, 2007, the station changed its call sign to the current WSNT.
