= KROP =

Radio station in Brawley, California, United States

Simulcasts KGBA-FM, Holtville, CA
- Brawley, California; United States
- Broadcast area: Imperial Valley
- Frequency: 1300 kHz

Programming
- Format: Christian radio
- Affiliations: SRN News

Ownership
- Owner: The Voice of International Christian Evangelism, Inc.
- Sister stations: KGBA, KGBA-FM

History
- First air date: November 1946
- Former call signs: KROP (1946–1998); KKSC (1998–2001)
- Call sign meaning: "Crop", the Imperial Valley is an agricultural region

Technical information
- Licensing authority: FCC
- Facility ID: 63470
- Class: B
- Power: 1,000 watts (day); 475 watts (night)
- Transmitter coordinates: 33°6′56.2″N 115°30′48.6″W

Links
- Public license information: Public file; LMS
- Webcast: Listen live
- Website: kgba.org

KROP (1300 AM) is a commercial radio station licensed to Brawley, California, United States, and serving the Imperial Valley. It broadcasts a Christian format simulcast with KGBA-FM (100.1), and is owned by The Voice of International Christian Evangelism, Inc. The studios are on West State Street in El Centro.

== History ==
The station first signed on the air in November 1946. It got the call sign KROP because the Imperial Valley is an agricultural region. The station was a CBS Radio Network affiliate, although in the 1960s, it switched to the Mutual Broadcasting System.

KROP had several music formats from the 1950s to the early 1980s, when it switched to a Talk radio format. In 1995, it flipped to country music. This lasted until 1998, when the station became KKSC, "ESPN 1300", a sports radio station affiliated with ESPN Radio. Though the station's audience grew with the sports format, KKSC had trouble selling the format to advertisers, rendering the station dependent on the profits of sister station 96.1 KSIQ.

Commonwealth Communications purchased the station from Stodelle Broadcasting in 1999. Two years later, the station changed back to KROP and began playing a classic country format provided by Westwood One's "Real Country" service. Cherry Creek Radio bought the station in 2003. In 2010, LarDog Communications, LLC. purchased KROP, installed new state of the art broadcasting equipment and changed the format back to talk radio.

After KSIQ was moved into the San Diego radio market, Cherry Creek Radio shut down KROP in April 2010, as the lack of an FM sister station made it difficult for the station to compete in the Imperial Valley radio market. The station was sold, and returned on the air when the sale was completed in August 2010. Brawley High School Wildcat Football was broadcast via the World Wide Web.

On August 1, 2014, KROP returned to classic country, citing low advertising revenues for the talk radio format.

It was reported on January 1, 2018, that KROP went off the air. The phone numbers for both KROP and its owner, LarDog, have been disconnected. The website is also not available. After briefly resuming operations in August, a lightning strike put the station off the air on August 27.

On June 11, 2019, LarDog filed to donate KROP to The Voice of International Christian Evangelism, which owns KGBA-AM-FM in Holtville. The donation was consummated on August 12, 2019.
