= KCUZ =

- Clifton, Arizona, US; United States
- Frequency: 1490 kHz

Programming
- Format: Rock

Ownership
- Owner: Cochise Broadcasting, LLC

Technical information
- Licensing authority: FCC
- Facility ID: 72369
- Class: C
- Power: 1,000 watts unlimited
- Transmitter coordinates: 33°2′30″N 109°17′40″W
- Translator: (96.9 MHz) K245CT (Clifton)

Links
- Public license information: Public file; LMS

KCUZ (1490 AM) is a radio station licensed to Clifton, Arizona, US and owned by Cochise Broadcasting LLC.
