= Giving Back to Africa =

- Abbreviation: GBA
- Formation: 2003
- Type: Non-profit organization
- Legal status: 501(c)(3)
- Purpose: Fostering Education and Community Service in the Democratic Republic of Congo
- Headquarters: Bloomington, Indiana
- Region served: Democratic Republic of Congo
- Official language: English
- Leader: Dena Hawes
- Website: givingbacktoafrica.org

Giving Back to Africa is a 501(c)(3) Bloomington, Indiana-based non-profit organization dedicated to the long-term mission of educating young people in the Democratic Republic of Congo. In partnership with local Congolese educational institutions and non-governmental organizations, its goal is to empower GBA beneficiaries - through service-centered education - to become servant-leaders capable of taking control of their own lives while serving as change agents in their local communities and throughout the Democratic Republic of Congo. The organization was featured in the Bloom Magazine, December 2008/January 2009 issue.
