= KYCT (FM) =

- Shasta Lake, California; United States
- Broadcast area: Redding, California
- Frequency: 92.7 MHz (HD Radio)
- Branding: 92.7 The Outlaw

Programming
- Format: Classic country
- Subchannels: HD2: KRAC simulcast HD3: KBLF simulcast

Ownership
- Owner: Frederick Penney, Donna Hunter, and Cal Hunter; (Independence Rock Media, LLC)

History
- First air date: 2017

Technical information
- Licensing authority: FCC
- Facility ID: 198770
- Class: A
- ERP: 285 watts
- HAAT: 452 meters

Links
- Public license information: Public file; LMS

KYCT (92.7 MHz, "92.7 The Outlaw") is a commercial FM radio station licensed in Shasta Lake, California and serves the Redding, California and Anderson, California areas. KYCT airs a classic country music format.

The station signed on the air in 2017 and was branded as "Kat Country 92.7 FM". Then sometime in early 2018, KYCT changed its branding to "92.7 The Outlaw" to match sister station KHEX in Chico, California and went more towards a classic country format rather than modern country.
