= KLNT =

Radio station in Laredo, Texas

Laredo, Texas; United States
- Broadcast area: Laredo, Texas; Nuevo Laredo, Tamaulipas
- Frequency: 1490 kHz
- Branding: Radio Vida

Programming
- Format: Spanish christian

Ownership
- Owner: Iglesia Cristiana Restauración y Vida (Note: Misspelled as "Cristinia" in the FCC)

History
- First air date: May 19, 1952
- Former call signs: KVOZ (1952–1988); KDOS (1988–1998)
- Call sign meaning: "Laredo's Newstalk" (former station format)

Technical information
- Licensing authority: FCC
- Facility ID: 42149
- Class: C
- Power: 1,000 watts unlimited
- Transmitter coordinates: 27°29′43″N 99°28′16″W

Links
- Public license information: Public file; LMS
- Website: radiovida.com

KLNT (1490 AM) is a Spanish christian radio station that serves the Laredo, Texas, United States and Nuevo Laredo, Tamaulipas, Mexico border area.

== History ==
1490 AM signed on in 1952 as the original KVOZ. It broadcast with 250 watts. Barely a year after signing on, KVOZ attempted a move to 1240 kHz that was contingent on KGBS, the existing station at 1240 (now defunct), surrendering its license; this was denied. Power was increased to 1,000 watts in 1970.

In 1988, KVOZ finally got its move and headed for newly built 890 AM. 1490 was relaunched as KDOS at that time and became KLNT in 1998, coinciding with a relaunch as a news/talk station.

KLNT went silent on December 6, 2020, due to technical issues with the station's transmitter. It returned in August 2021. The station flipped to Spanish-language Christian radio programming in October 2021 after being acquired.
