= KZZN =

- Littlefield, Texas; United States
- Frequency: 1490 kHz
- Branding: The New KZZN

Programming
- Format: Classic Country
- Affiliations: Citadel Media

Ownership
- Owner: Monte Spearman; (HPRN)
- Sister stations: KLVT

Technical information
- Licensing authority: FCC
- Facility ID: 19507
- Class: C
- Power: 1,000 watts unlimited
- Transmitter coordinates: 33°56′17.00″N 102°20′38.00″W

Links
- Public license information: Public file; LMS
- Website: hprnetwork.com Corporate Website; KZZN Website

KZZN (1490 AM, "High Plains Radio") is a radio station broadcasting a classic country music format. Licensed to Littlefield, Texas, United States, the station is currently owned by Monte Spearman, through licensee HPRN, and features programming from Citadel Media.

Former logo
