= Global Biofuel Alliance =

International alliance on biofuels

Global Biofuels Alliance (GBA) was announced during 2023 G20 New Delhi summit on 9 September 2023 to promote the development and adoption of sustainable biofuels and set relevant standards and certification.

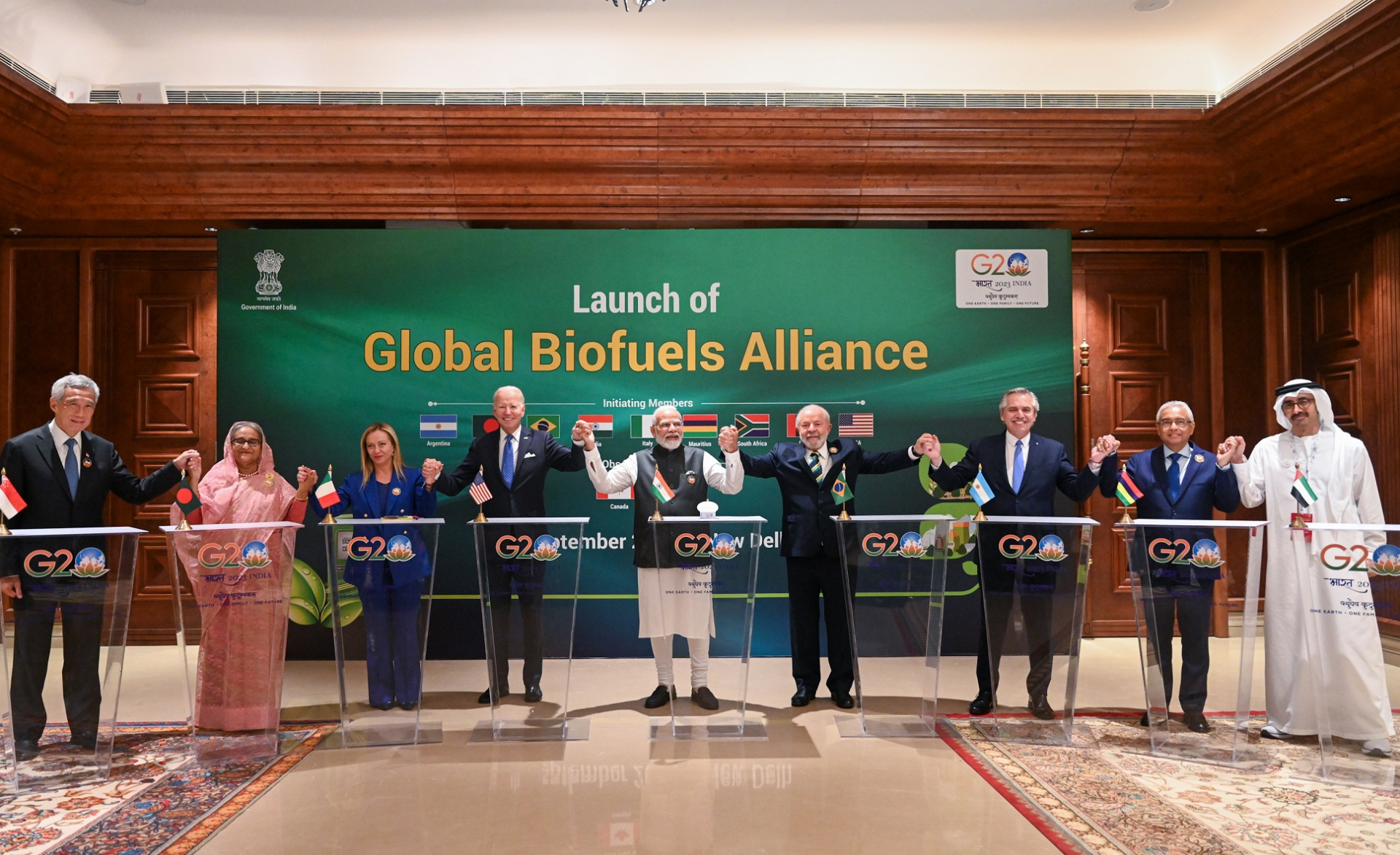
Launch of the Global Biofuels Alliance at G20 New Delhi 2023

== Members ==
The following is a list of member countries of the alliance:

22 countries and 12 international organizations have already agreed to join the alliance:

Eight G20 countries: 1. Argentina, 2. Brazil, 3. Canada, 4. India 5. Italy, 6. Japan 7. South Africa, 8. USA

Four G20 Invitee Countries: 1. Bangladesh, 2. Singapore, 3. Mauritius, 4. UAE

Ten non G20 countries: 1. Iceland, 2. Kenya, 3. Guyana, 4. Paraguay, 5. Seychelles, 6. Sri Lanka, 7. Uganda, 8. Finland, 9. Tanzania, 10. Philippines

Twelve International organizations: Asian Development Bank, World Economic Forum, World LPG Organization, UN Energy for All, UNIDO, Biofutures Platform, International Civil Aviation Organization, International Energy Agency, International Energy Forum, International Renewable Energy Agency, World Biogas Association. World Bank

== See also ==
- International Solar Alliance – Solar energy initiative launched in 2015
