= Golaghat Bar Association =

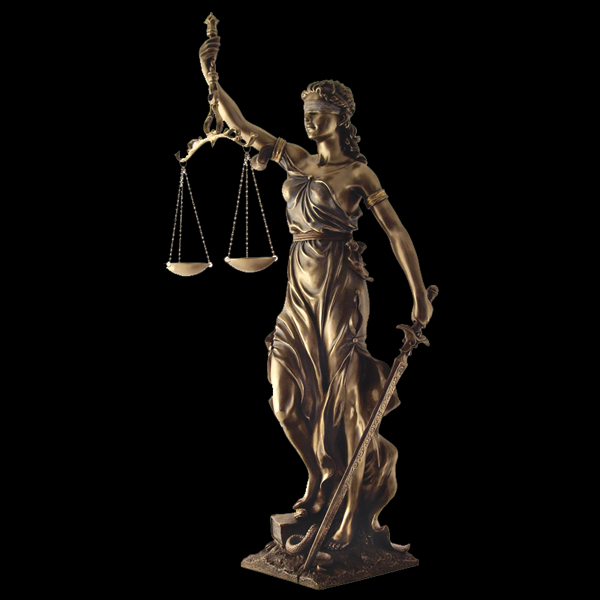
- Formation: 1891; 135 years ago
- Founders: G. Baruah; K. P. Dowarah
- Type: Legal Society
- Headquarters: Golaghat
- Location: Assam, India
- Official language: English, Asamiya
- Secretary General: Prodyut Madhab Dutta
- President: Dipom Ranjan Handique
- Vice-president: Nitul Bora
- Secretary General (Asst.): Nazrul Islam
- Library Secretary: Pratul Borbora
- Affiliations: Bar Council of India (BCI)
- Staff: 500
- Website: GBA

The Golaghat Bar Association or GBA, is a voluntary bar association for the Golaghat Higher Judiciary in Golaghat, Assam. The goals of the association is to regulate the legal practice and legal education in Golaghat and to cultivate the science of jurisprudence; to promote reform in the law; to facilitate the administration of justice, and to elevate the standards of integrity, honor, professional skill, and courtesy in the legal profession, including exercising disciplinary jurisdiction over the bar. Its members are elected amongst the lawyers in Golaghat Judiciary

== History ==
GBA was founded in 1891, Golaghat, Assam after the Sadar Courts were extended to Golaghat in 1839. The founding members namely, G. Baruah and K. P. Dowarah, along with other lawyers during that time felt the need to institutionalize the practice of taking proper action on all matters affecting the legal profession and the administration of justice, essential for the benefit of litigant citizens of Golaghat.

GBA formed before India's independence of 1947, has played a significant role during India's freedom struggle. Advocate members of the GBA, namely Gangadhar Borthakur and Kamleswar Sarma boycotted courts and joined the Quit India Movement in 1921. The lawyers were pronounced guilty for their participation in the movement, and that emanated mass protests from the citizens of Golaghat near Golaghat Jail. Maheshwar Barooah and Tara Prasad Barooah, brothers from the same family, who prosecuted their law studies in Gauhati and later practised law in Golaghat Judiciary, and were GBA members, were boycotted for their participation in the movement as they took to streets serving as vegetable vendors in the local market and labourers at Golaghat Station to propagate the concept of self-dependence, the premise of the Quit India Movement.

== Present ==
With an increase in the overall enrolment of its members from 350 in 2014, to the present number of 500 members, GBA has had a growth in its infrastructure facilities to even include a crèche and gymnasium. It has recently celebrated its quasquicentennial ceremony in September 2017.

== Activities ==
GBA has been facilitating the administration of justice for approximately 1.1 million people of Golaghat district, and plays an active role in regulating the legal practice and extending courtesy in the legal profession. The forum had refrained its members in the past from appearing before the court of the subdivisional judicial magistrate (SDJM), Titabor as a mark of protest against the detention of one of its members in the court cell allegedly without following norms. The association demanded appropriate action from the highest judiciary of the state, Gauhati High Court as the treatment by SDJM was against established procedure of law, violating human rights and dignity. Previously, GBA had also suspended five of its member advocates in 2012 at an executive meeting on account of alleged professional misconduct under the registered case – GR Case No. 587/12.

To promote reform in the law, GBA actively participates in protests and demonstrations, including UPA's injustice to Baba Ramdev, besides encouraging Anna Hazare’s movement for Jan Lokpal Bill.

The association has been vocal on social security issues. It had condemned Assam serial bombings of 2008 by organising a silent peace march.

GBA has been contributing to legal studies and education through Golaghat Law College since 1979. The college is affiliated to Dibrugarh University, and the law programme is approved by Bar Council of India (BCI), New Delhi, India.

== Structure ==
GBA has an Executive Committee that changes every two years. The executive members constitute the following positions:

- President
- Vice-president
- Secretary General
- Secretary General (Asstt.)
- Library Secretary
- Auditor
- Treasurer

== See also ==
- Bar Council of India
- Gauhati High Court
- Golaghat
