= KBZY =

- Salem, Oregon; United States
- Broadcast area: Salem, Oregon and vicinity
- Frequency: 1490 kHz
- Branding: KBZY 1490 AM

Programming
- Format: Oldies
- Affiliations: ABC Radio Network

Ownership
- Owner: Louis Risewick; (Rise 95, LLC)

History
- First air date: 1947 (as KOCO)
- Former call signs: KOCO (1947–1957)

Technical information
- Licensing authority: FCC
- Facility ID: 8608
- Class: C
- Power: 1,000 watts (unlimited)
- Transmitter coordinates: 44°52′53.4″N 122°59′10.3″W

Links
- Public license information: Public file; LMS
- Webcast: Listen Live
- Website: kbzy.com

KBZY (1490 AM) is a radio station licensed to serve Salem, Oregon, United States. The station, established in 1957, has been owned by Louis Risewick since 2020 and broadcasts an oldies format.

== History ==
Late-1960s station logo

This station was first licensed August 21, 1947, and held the call sign KOCO. It ran 250 watt and was owned by B. Loring Schmidt. In 1957, its call sign was changed to KBZY. KBZY increased its daytime power to 1,000 watts in 1961. The station played a rock-leaning Top 40 format through the 1960s and 1970s.

After more than a quarter-century of continuous ownership, Salem Broadcasting reached an agreement in September 1980 to sell KBZY to Friendship Communications Company. The deal was approved by the FCC on January 16, 1981. This change would prove short-lived as Friendship Communications Company agreed in April 1982 to sell this station to Capital Broadcasting, Inc. The deal was approved by the FCC on June 15, 1982.

In October 1985, James J. Opsitnik contracted to sell KBZY license holder Capital Broadcasting, Inc., to Leroy W. Dittman. The deal was approved by the FCC on November 26, 1985, and the transaction was consummated on January 22, 1986. As of March 2009, Leroy Dittman was the sole voting shareholder in Capital Broadcasting, Inc.

In August 2011, the construction of a KinStar antenna was completed and the transmitter was moved to a new location and put into service. Rick Allen and CE Ron Dot'o built the transmitter plant over the Summer.

Effective December 7, 2020, following the death of Leroy Dittman, Capital Broadcasting sold KBZY to Louis Risewick's Rise 95, LLC for $50,000.
