= WJAY =

Radio station in Mullins, South Carolina

- Mullins, South Carolina; United States
- Frequency: 1280 kHz

Programming
- Format: Urban contemporary gospel

Ownership
- Owner: Door of Hope Christian Church, Inc.

Technical information
- Licensing authority: FCC
- Facility ID: 66139
- Class: B
- Power: 4,200 watts day 270 watts night
- Transmitter coordinates: 34°11′30.00″N 79°18′55.00″W
- Repeater: 98.3 W252BL (Mullins)

Links
- Public license information: Public file; LMS
- Website: https://wjayradio.com/

WJAY (1280 AM) is an American radio station broadcasting an Urban contemporary gospel format, licensed by the FCC to serve the community of Mullins, South Carolina. As of June 28, 2018, the station license was assigned to Door of Hope Christian Church.

== Translators ==
In addition to the main station, WJAY is relayed by a translator to widen its broadcast area.

Call sign	Frequency	City of license	FID	ERP (W)	Class	FCC info
W252BL	98.3 FM	Mullins, South Carolina	139657	250	D	LMS
