= WGCD =

- Chester, South Carolina; United States
- Frequency: 1490 kHz
- Branding: The Rejoice Network

Programming
- Format: Urban gospel

Ownership
- Owner: Wisdom, LLC

History
- First air date: July 18, 1948

Technical information
- Licensing authority: FCC
- Facility ID: 10761
- Class: C
- Power: 650 watts unlimited
- Transmitter coordinates: 34°41′54″N 81°12′6″W
- Translator: 104.5 W283CY (Chester)

Links
- Public license information: Public file; LMS
- Website: wgcd1045fm.com

WGCD (1490 kHz) is an AM radio station licensed to Chester, South Carolina. The station broadcasts an urban gospel radio format and is owned by Wisdom, LLC.

WGCD is powered at 650 watts non-directional as a Class C station. Programming is also heard on 250 watt FM translator W283CY at 104.5 MHz.

== History ==
On July 18, 1948, the station signed on for the first time. It was the first radio station in Chester County, South Carolina, put on the air by Morgan Jones Craig (1920–1964), a Chester native with a degree in engineering. Through his work as an aide-de-camp to a general in the Pacific theatre in World War II, he had developed an interest in radio. Morgan Craig designed and built the building where WGCD was housed for many years.

The call sign stands for "Wonderful Guernsey Center of Dixie." Chester was well supplied with this variety of dairy cow and Morgan Craig's father, Alec Bell Craig, had guernseys on the family farm (called "Craigbow") outside of Chester.

WGCD was a family business and included locally generated programming. Shortly after World War II, Morgan's sister, Mary Craig, hosted a cooking/homemaking show called "Miss B".

Because the Craigs were staunch Presbyterians, the 11:15 am Sunday morning worship was broadcast weekly from Purity Presbyterian Church for 40 years, until the 1980s.
