= KOKB =

- Blackwell, Oklahoma; United States
- Broadcast area: Ponca City, Oklahoma
- Frequency: 1580 kHz
- Branding: Triple Play Sports Radio

Programming
- Format: Sports
- Affiliations: Fox Sports Radio

Ownership
- Owner: Team Radio, LLC
- Sister stations: KOKP

History
- First air date: October 1952 (as KLTR)
- Former call signs: KLTR (1952–1984)

Technical information
- Licensing authority: FCC
- Facility ID: 43733
- Class: D
- Power: 1,000 watts day 49 watts night
- Transmitter coordinates: 36.80972°N 97.26389°W
- Translator: 93.3 K227DK (Blackwell)
- Repeaters: 1020 KOKP (Perry); 105.1 KOSB (Perry)

Links
- Public license information: Public file; LMS
- Webcast: Listen Live
- Website: tripleplaysportsradio.com

KOKB (1580 AM) is a radio station licensed to Blackwell, Oklahoma, United States. The station broadcasts a sports format and is owned by Team Radio, LLC.

Logo before translator sign ons

== Translator ==
Broadcast translator for KOKB
Call sign	Frequency	City of license	FID	ERP (W)	HAAT	Class	FCC info
K227DK	93.3 FM	Blackwell, Oklahoma	201333	250	64 m (210 ft)	D	LMS
