= KWXT =

- Dardanelle, Arkansas; United States
- Broadcast area: Russellville, Arkansas
- Frequency: 1490 kHz

Programming
- Format: Southern gospel

Ownership
- Owner: Bradford Caldwell; (Caldwell Media, LLC)

Technical information
- Licensing authority: FCC
- Facility ID: 23872
- Class: C
- Power: 1,000 watts
- Transmitter coordinates: 35°13′08″N 93°07′38″W

Links
- Public license information: Public file; LMS
- Webcast: Listen live
- Website: kwxt1490am.com

KWXT 1490 AM is a radio station licensed to Dardanelle, Arkansas. The station broadcasts a Southern Gospel format and is owned by Bradford Caldwell, through licensee Caldwell Media, LLC.
