= KYRO (AM) =

Radio station in Troy, Missouri

Coordinates: 39°3′13.2″N 90°59′47.5″W

- Troy, Missouri; United States
- Broadcast area: Greater St. Louis
- Frequency: 1280 kHz
- Branding: News Radio KYRO

Programming
- Format: Conservative talk radio
- Affiliations: Fox News Radio

Ownership
- Owner: Lee Thompson and John Scheper; (Lincoln County Broadcasting LLC)

History
- First air date: February 22, 1959

Technical information
- Licensing authority: FCC
- Facility ID: 59251
- Class: D
- Power: 660 watts (day); 45 watts (night)
- Translator: 105.3 K287CM (Troy)

Links
- Public license information: Public file; LMS
- Webcast: Listen live (via TuneIn)
- Website: newsradiokyro.com

KYRO (1280 AM) is a commercial radio station licensed to Troy, Missouri, United States, serving the western suburbs of St. Louis. KYRO airs a conservative talk format and is owned by Lee Thompson and John Scheper, through licensee Lincoln County Broadcasting LLC.

Programming is also heard on FM translator K287CM at 105.3 MHz in Troy.

== History ==
The station signed on the air on February 22, 1959. Its original city of license was Potosi, Missouri. In its early years, the station was a daytimer, required to go off the air at night to avoid interfering with other stations on 1280 AM. It later got authorization to remain on the air after sunset with low power.

== Programming ==
Much of KYRO's programming is nationally syndicated conservative talk programs.

KYRO carries live sports, including Kansas City Chiefs football, St. Louis Blues hockey and University of Missouri Tigers athletics. It runs NASCAR races from the Motor Racing Network and the Performance Racing Network. It is also the flagship station for Maryville University Saints Hockey broadcasts.
