= WJOC =

- Chattanooga, Tennessee; United States
- Broadcast area: Chattanooga
- Frequency: 1490 kHz
- Branding: AM 1490

Programming
- Format: News/Talk & Religious

Ownership
- Owner: Sarah Margarett Fryar

History
- Former call signs: WDXB (1948–1991)

Technical information
- Licensing authority: FCC
- Facility ID: 31861
- Class: C
- Power: 1,000 watts unlimited
- Transmitter coordinates: 35°3′7.00″N 85°16′24.00″W

Links
- Public license information: Public file; LMS
- Webcast: Listen Live
- Website: wjoc.com

WJOC "Bible Talk Chattanooga (1490 AM, "AM 1490") is a radio station broadcasting a talk format. Licensed to Chattanooga, Tennessee, United States, the station serves the Chattanooga and surrounding areas. The station is currently owned by Sarah Margarett Fryar. The station was WDXB from 1948–1989. In the 1960s through the early 1980s it was one of Chattanooga's most popular Top-40 stations and featured popular personalities Chickamauga Charlie or "Chicky Poo", who later went to WGOW, and Johnny Walker, who later went to WKGN in Knoxville. In the 1980s it aired multiple formats. Everything from country to punk rock, even blues was heard on the station during this time. In 1989 the owners sold to the station to Chattanooga Lookouts play-by-play announcer Larry Ward. Under Larry's direction the station became WJOC, Chattanooga's first all-sports station. However, the format was short-lived, and in 1993 WJOC was sold to its current owner and adopted its current talk radio/religious format. In 1999, WJOC became the first radio station in the Chattanooga Market to stream it's audio world wide on the internet.

== History of call letters ==
The call letters WJOC previously belonged to an AM station in Jamestown, New York. It began broadcasting January 26, 1948, on 1470 kHz with 1 KW power (daytime).
