= KMFS =

Radio station in Guthrie–Oklahoma City, Oklahoma

- Guthrie, Oklahoma; United States
- Broadcast area: Oklahoma City Metroplex
- Frequency: 1490 kHz
- Branding: SonLife Radio

Programming
- Format: Southern Gospel - Christian talk and teaching

Ownership
- Owner: Family Worship Center Church, Inc. (Jimmy Swaggart Ministries)

History
- Former call signs: KWRW (1956–1970); KOKC (1970–2004)

Technical information
- Licensing authority: FCC
- Facility ID: 50165
- Class: C
- Power: 1,000 watts
- Transmitter coordinates: 35°52′56.2″N 97°23′35.1″W

Links
- Public license information: Public file; LMS
- Website: Official website

KMFS (1490 AM) is a radio station licensed to Guthrie, Oklahoma, and serving the Oklahoma City Metroplex. The station is owned by Family Worship Center Church, Inc. It is part of the Jimmy Swaggart Ministries.

KMFS airs Southern Gospel music and Christian talk and teaching programs. It broadcasts at 1,000 watts around the clock, using a non-directional antenna.

== History ==
KWRW went on air in 1956. The station was owned by Southern Broadcasting Company, whose three principals—James A. West Jr., Elgie M. Risinger, and Delvin R. White—lent their initials to the call letters of the new outlet. A year after signing on, Weldon Sledge, who had run a station in Morrilton, Arkansas, bought KWRW, but he only owned it for a year, as Guthrie Broadcasters—owned by Farrell and Norma Sue Brooks—acquired the station in 1958. The carousel of ownership changes continued; at the end of 1959, KWRW was sold to Howard Daniel Smith, and in mid-1961, the Austin Oil Company bought the radio station.

The call letters were changed to KOKC on December 15, 1970; the next year, Austin Oil won approval to increase the station's daytime power to 500 watts and relocate the transmitter, changes that came into effect in 1972. Pioneer Broadcasters bought KOKC in 1978.

The station was sold to the Family Worship Center in 2003. In 2004, the station became KMFS, freeing up the KOKC call letters to be used at their current home at 1520 AM.
