= WSIR =

- Winter Haven, Florida; United States
- Broadcast area: Central Florida - Lakeland - Winter Haven
- Frequency: 1490 kHz

Programming
- Format: Urban Gospel

Ownership
- Owner: Ferris Waller; (Walco Enterprises LLC)

Technical information
- Licensing authority: FCC
- Facility ID: 72683
- Class: C
- Power: 1,000 watts unlimited
- Transmitter coordinates: 28°0′50.00″N 81°45′2.00″W

Links
- Public license information: Public file; LMS
- Website: familyradio1490.com

WSIR (1490 kHz) is a commercial AM radio station broadcasting an Urban Gospel radio format. Licensed to Winter Haven, Florida, the station serves the Lakeland - Winter Haven area of Central Florida. The station is currently owned by Ferris Waller, through licensee Walco Enterprises LLC.

The station filed a notification of silence with the FCC on 22 June 2026, and is off the air.
