= KRAC =

- Red Bluff, California; United States
- Broadcast area: Northern California
- Frequency: 1370 kHz
- Branding: Talk Radio 1370

Programming
- Format: Talk radio

Ownership
- Owner: Independence Rock Media Group; (Independence Rock Media, LLC)
- Sister stations: KAJK, KBLF, KEGE, KGXX, KHEX, KIQS, KLZN, KTOR

History
- First air date: August 16, 1963
- Former call signs: KQCY (1963–1968); KPCO (1968–2009)

Technical information
- Licensing authority: FCC
- Facility ID: 54978
- Class: D
- Power: 4,000 watts (day); 200 watts (night)
- Transmitter coordinates: 40°11′36.6″N 122°13′0″W
- Repeater: 92.7 KYCT-HD2 (Shasta Lake)

Links
- Public license information: Public file; LMS
- Webcast: Listen live
- Website: indrockmedia.com

KRAC (1370 AM) is a commercial radio station licensed to Red Bluff, California, United States, serving Northern California including Redding. It features a talk radio format. Owned by the Independence Rock Media Group, the station's transmitter is located in Red Bluff.

== History ==
=== KQCY ===
The station signed on the air on August 16, 1963. Its original call sign was KQCY and its city of license was Quincy. It called itself "K-Quincy". The FCC granted the license for the 1370 AM frequency for daytime operation only at 500 watts. It had to protect the signal of KEEN in San Jose, which is a 5,000 watt station also on 1370. KQCY was allowed to sign on at 6 a.m., but had to sign off at sunset to avoid interference. In winter, that meant the station went off the air at 4:45 p.m.

KQCY originally used a modified RCA transmitter that had been used on a naval ship during World War II. The studios and transmitter were located in East Quincy behind a bowling alley.

=== KPCO ===
In the late 1960s, the call letters were changed to KPCO, calling itself "K-Plumas County." In 1976, the station moved to new state of the art studios in downtown Quincy. The signal got an upgrade, now using a new 5,000 watt transmitter, installed at the old site. From 6 a.m. to 8 a.m., disc jockey Andy Anderson, who was also Quincy’s fire chief, hosted a country music program. The rest of the day, it was programmed by Stan Castles who had radio experience in Texas. KPCO became a popular Top 40 radio station. By the late 1970s, KPCO switched to a middle of the road (MOR) format of popular adult music.

KPCO was also an important source for daily news in Plumas County. A half-hour local newscast was broadcast each weekday morning from 8:00 to 8:30, with a live call-in talk show “People's Dialogue” from 8:30 to 9:00. There were hourly newscasts throughout the day with extended newscasts at noon and 4 p.m. News directors included Tom Guarino and Dan Adams, who went on to KHSL-TV in Chico, California and eventually on to KXTV, News10 in Sacramento for 27 years.

In the early 1980s, KPCO was granted a license to broadcast full-time with limited power at night. Its commitment to Plumas County expanded as its signal strength increased to include much of the county. In the 1990s, longtime owner Ralph Wittick sold KPCO.

=== KRAC ===
As other radio stations signed on the air in Plumas County, KPCO was no longer the only choice. By the late 1990s, KPCO abandoned music programming and adopted a conservative talk show format. After a series of changes in ownership, KPCO went off the air. According to FCC records, the station went temporarily silent in 2007 due to financial problems.

The station went back on the air under the ownership of the Independence Rock Media Group. The station moved its studios and transmitter to Red Bluff and it changed its call sign to KRAC on August 28, 2009.
