= KLZN =

- Susanville, California; United States
- Frequency: 1490 kHz
- Branding: Fox Sports Radio 1490

Programming
- Format: Sports
- Affiliations: Fox Sports Radio

Ownership
- Owner: Independence Rock Media Group; (Independence Rock Media, LLC)
- Sister stations: KAJK, KBLF, KEGE, KGXX, KHEX, KIQS, KRAC, KTOR

History
- First air date: May 13, 2010

Technical information
- Licensing authority: FCC
- Facility ID: 160277
- Class: C
- Power: 950 watts (day); 870 watts (night)
- Transmitter coordinates: 40°26′37.6″N 120°38′38.8″W
- Translator: 99.3 K257EK (Susanville)

Links
- Public license information: Public file; LMS
- Website: indrockmedia.com

KLZN (1490 kHz) is a class C radio station broadcasting out of Susanville, California. The station holds a Sports radio format from the Fox Sports Radio network. Programming is also relayed on low-powered 12 watt translator, K257EK in Susanville.

== History ==
KLZN began broadcasting on May 13, 2010.
