= KOKP =

Simulcasts KOKB Blackwell
- Perry, Oklahoma; United States
- Broadcast area: Stillwater, Oklahoma
- Frequency: 1020 kHz
- Branding: Triple Play Sports Radio

Programming
- Format: Sports
- Affiliations: Fox Sports Radio

Ownership
- Owner: Team Radio, LLC
- Sister stations: KOKB

History
- First air date: July 6, 1986 (as KRAD)
- Former call signs: KRAD (1985–1993); KASR (1993–1995); KVCS (1995–1998)

Technical information
- Licensing authority: FCC
- Facility ID: 62346
- Class: B
- Power: 400 watts day 250 watts night
- Transmitter coordinates: 36.25972°N 97.21694°W
- Translator: 93.1 K226CW (Stillwater)

Links
- Public license information: Public file; LMS
- Webcast: Listen Live
- Website: tripleplaysportsradio.com

KOKP (1020 AM) is a radio station licensed to Perry, Oklahoma. The station broadcasts a sports format and is owned by Team Radio, LLC.

Logo before translator sign ons

== Translators ==
Broadcast translator for KOKP
Call sign	Frequency	City of license	FID	ERP (W)	HAAT	Class	FCC info
K226CW	93.1 FM	Stillwater, Oklahoma	202367	170	103 m (338 ft)	D	LMS
