= KQEN =

- Roseburg, Oregon; United States
- Frequency: 1240 kHz
- Branding: News Radio 1240 KQEN

Programming
- Format: News Talk Information
- Affiliations: Fox News Radio; Compass Media Networks; Genesis Communications Network; Premiere Networks; USA Radio Network; Westwood One; Oregon Ducks

Ownership
- Owner: Brooke Communications, Inc.
- Sister stations: KKMX, KRSB-FM, KSKR, KSKR-FM

History
- First air date: September 19, 1950

Technical information
- Licensing authority: FCC
- Facility ID: 40386
- Class: C
- Power: 1,000 watts (unlimited)
- Transmitter coordinates: 43°11′35″N 123°21′39″W
- Translator: 93.9 K230CG (Roseburg)

Links
- Public license information: Public file; LMS
- Webcast: Listen Live
- Website: kqennewsradio.com

KQEN (1240 AM) is a radio station broadcasting a News Talk Information format. It is licensed to Roseburg, Oregon, United States. The station is currently owned by Brooke Communications and features programming from Fox News Radio, Compass Media Networks, Genesis Communications Network, Premiere Networks, USA Radio Network, and Westwood One.
