= KPRV-FM =

- Heavener, Oklahoma; United States
- Broadcast area: Heavener, Oklahoma; Poteau, Oklahoma
- Frequency: 92.5 MHz

Programming
- Format: Classic hits; Classic country

Ownership
- Owner: Leroy Billy
- Sister stations: KPRV

Technical information
- Licensing authority: FCC
- Facility ID: 37088
- Class: A
- ERP: 1,550 watts
- HAAT: 195 meters (640 ft)
- Transmitter coordinates: 34.89833°N 94.57500°W

Links
- Public license information: Public file; LMS
- Website: kprvradio.com

KPRV-FM (92.5 FM) is a radio station licensed to Heavener, Oklahoma. The station broadcasts a format consisting of classic country and classic hits as well as Gospel music on Sundays. KPRV-FM is owned by Leroy Billy.
