= KRRS =

- Santa Rosa, California; United States
- Broadcast area: Santa Rosa
- Frequency: 1460 kHz
- Branding: El Patrón Radio

Programming
- Format: Regional Mexican

Ownership
- Owner: Abel De Luna; (Luna Foods, Inc.)
- Sister stations: KZNB

History
- First air date: 1963

Technical information
- Licensing authority: FCC
- Facility ID: 43710
- Class: D
- Power: 1,000 watts day 33 watts night
- Transmitter coordinates: 38°22′12.7″N 122°43′43″W
- Translators: 94.7 K234DD (Santa Rosa); 105.7 K289AS (Cotati)

Links
- Public license information: Public file; LMS
- Webcast: Listen Live
- Website: www.lamaquinamusical.us

KRRS (1460 AM) is a radio station broadcasting a Regional Mexican format. Licensed to Santa Rosa, California, United States, it serves the Santa Rosa area. The station is currently owned by Abel De Luna, through licensee Luna Foods, Inc.
