= KBLF =

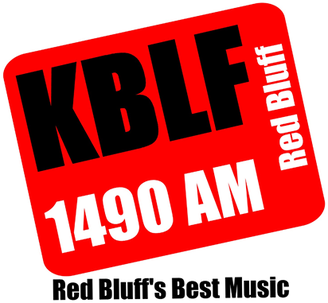
- Red Bluff, California; United States
- Frequency: 1490 kHz
- Branding: AM 1490

Programming
- Format: Adult standards
- Affiliations: America's Best Music; CBS News Radio

Ownership
- Owner: Independence Rock Media Group; (Independence Rock Media, LLC)
- Sister stations: KAJK, KEGE, KGXX, KHEX, KIQS, KLZN, KRAC, KTOR

History
- First air date: 1946
- Call sign meaning: Red Bluff

Technical information
- Licensing authority: FCC
- Facility ID: 48853
- Class: C
- Power: 1,000 watts
- Transmitter coordinates: 40°11′36.6″N 122°12′59.99″W
- Repeater: 92.7 KYCT-HD3 (Shasta Lake)

Links
- Public license information: Public file; LMS

KBLF (1490 AM, "Radio 1490") is a radio station licensed to Red Bluff, California, United States. It is owned by Independence Rock Media Group of Red Bluff, California (also owns KRAC in Red Bluff and KIQS in Willows) and Cal Hunter serves as the station's managing partner, general manager, main on-air talent, and morning personality. KBLF plays an adult standards/oldies format and is an America's Best Music (Westwood One) and CBS News affiliate.

== Local station ==
KBLF first signed on the air in 1946. In 1962, their transmitter was relocated to gravel beds just north of the Sacramento River. KBLF and KRAC remain as Tehama County's only AM radio stations.

Cal Hunter, general manager and main radio host of KBLF, has been a television and Radio broadcaster for nearly 50 years and is best remembered as the former news director and anchor of ABC affiliate, KRCR-TV Channel 7 in Redding, California. As a journalist, he has interviewed many business leaders, newsmakers and presidents. For his news management he was nominated for three Northern California Emmy Awards.

He is joined with former Red Bluff Mayor Earl Wintle, conservative columnist Don Polson, and owner of Trophy Traditions and West Valley High School head baseball coach and teacher Paul Vietti (formerly of KQMS and KMCA radio, formerly of Action Video Entertainment), for the KBLF Morning Show on weekday mornings. He is joined in the mornings with local mortgage broker Bob Martin for "Cal and Bob in the Morning".

Several well-known radio figures spent the early part of their careers at KBLF, including San Francisco radio veteran Carter B. Smith, and Los Angeles radio personality Jeff Serr.

KBLF is also the official flagship station for Red Bluff High School Spartan football with Cal Hunter and John Gentry providing the commentary. 1490 AM at one time aired Spartans basketball play-by-play with the late Lance Fellman on the call. He has also provided play-by-play for the Feather River College Golden Eagles, based in Quincy.

In July 2020, Hunter became 49% owner of the station and its sister stations as Independence Rock Media Group following the untimely death of station majority owner Tom Huth. The deal, which included eight sister stations and three translators, was consummated on July 24, 2021, at a price of $400,000.
