= WYYZ =

- Jasper, Georgia; United States
- Broadcast area: Pickens County, Georgia
- Frequency: 1490 kHz
- Branding: El Gallo 102.5 FM

Programming
- Format: Regional Mexican

Ownership
- Owner: Steven Lara; (Gorilla Broadcasting Atl LLC)

History
- First air date: May 1974

Technical information
- Licensing authority: FCC
- Facility ID: 46480
- Class: C
- Power: 1,000 watts (unlimited)
- Transmitter coordinates: 34°28′35.40″N 84°26′17.30″W
- Translator: 102.7 W273CT (Canton)

Links
- Public license information: Public file; LMS
- Website: elgallo943.com

WYYZ (1490 AM) is a radio station licensed to Jasper, Georgia, United States, broadcasting a regional Mexican format. The station is currently owned by Steven Lara through licensee Gorilla Broadcasting Atl LLC. Low-power FM translator W273CT (102.5 FM) relays WYYZ around the clock. A strange setup at this site. The broadcasts come from a long radiating wire attached to a wooden pole.
