= WYAL =

Simulcast of WWTC, Minneapolis, MN
- Scotland Neck, North Carolina; United States
- Frequency: 1280 kHz

Programming
- Format: Talk radio

Ownership
- Owner: Sky City Communications, Inc.

Technical information
- Licensing authority: FCC
- Facility ID: 74223
- Class: D
- Power: 5,000 watts day only
- Transmitter coordinates: 36°08′09″N 77°26′09″W

Links
- Public license information: Public file; LMS

WYAL (1280 AM) is a radio station broadcasting a Talk radio format. Licensed to Scotland Neck, North Carolina, United States, the station is owned by Sky City Communications Inc. Simulcasting a talk radio format with WWTC in Minneapolis, Minnesota.
