= KZNB =

- Petaluma, California; United States
- Broadcast area: Santa Rosa
- Frequency: 1490 kHz
- Branding: La Musikera

Programming
- Format: Regional Mexican

Ownership
- Owner: Abel De Luna; (Luna Foods, Inc.)
- Sister stations: KRRS

History
- First air date: 1950
- Former call signs: KAFP (1950–1961); KTOB (1961–2014)

Technical information
- Licensing authority: FCC
- Facility ID: 52345
- Class: C
- Power: 1,000 watts (unlimited)
- Transmitter coordinates: 38°13′36.7″N 122°37′20.9″W
- Translators: 102.5 K273CU (Petaluma); 105.7 K289AS (Cotati); 107.5 K298AZ (Santa Rosa)

Links
- Public license information: Public file; LMS
- Webcast: Listen live
- Website: lamusikera.com

KZNB (1490 AM) is a radio station that broadcasts a Regional Mexican format. Licensed to Petaluma, California, United States, it serves the Santa Rosa area. The station is owned by Abel De Luna, through licensee Luna Foods, Inc.

The station's original transmitter building and radio tower (since destroyed) were featured in the film American Graffiti. The interior "DJ" scenes, featuring Wolfman Jack, were filmed at KRE in Berkeley, California.

On Tuesday, January 10, 1950, at 6 a.m., 1490 kHz commenced broadcasting as KAFP, which stood for 'Krowing Always For Petaluma,' associating the city with its poultry-processing status. Under the original ownership of Harold Sparks and Forrest Hughes, a.k.a. Petaluma Broadcasters, KAFP broadcast a hodgepodge of local and network/syndicated programs such as Sammy Kaye's music show, UP Radio News, a.o. For most of its life, 1490 signed off around midnight, though it was licensed to broadcast 24 hours daily.

KAFP, now owned by Lloyd Burlingham, became KTOB at 6:45 p.m. on January 10, 1961, eleven years after signing on. The format remained relatively the same, with a mix of news, talk, sports and music shows geared toward the Petaluma community.

During its life, KTOB was fraught with financial problems. On September 30, 1963, KTOB was shut down due to bankruptcy, but was resuscitated two weeks later. At that time, October 13, 1963, a gentleman became closely associated with KTOB's mostly-MOR (middle of the road music) programming over the next several years, and eventually became a part-owner: Ron Walters.

Local sports broadcasts, church features, and a strong community orientation were hallmarks of KTOB well into the 1980s. Notable air talent in this era included Larry Chiaroni, now a news anchor and reporter for KCBS San Francisco; John Emmett, who later became play-by-play broadcaster for the AAA baseball Richmond Braves; Roger Coryell, longtime San Francisco jazz host and programmer; Ken Korach, who is now the play-by-play announcer for the Oakland Athletics; and Alan Stock, a nationally known radio talk show host at KXNT in Las Vegas.

KTOB changed its call sign to the current KZNB on November 14, 2014.

Former logo

As of 2013, the station's audio is also heard via an FM translator K273CU on 102.5Mhz.

As of 2024, the stations tower and transmitter have been removed; the station is operating under STA with 100 Watts from a longwire antenna on Mount Sonoma while it attempts to find a permanent transmitter site and return to full power. The location now (in the latest Google Earth image dated April 2026) shows considerable commercial development.
