= KWMC (AM) =

Radio station in Del Rio, Texas, United States

Coordinates: 29.3716°N 100.8656°W

- Del Rio, Texas; United States
- Frequency: 1490 kHz

Programming
- Format: Classic hits

Ownership
- Owner: Guillermo Garza

History
- First air date: 1967

Technical information
- Licensing authority: FCC
- Facility ID: 21247
- Class: C
- Power: 1,000 watts

Links
- Public license information: Public file; LMS
- Webcast: Listen Live
- Website: kwmc1490.com

KWMC 1490 AM is a radio station licensed to Del Rio, Texas. The station airs a classic hits format and is owned by Guillermo Garza.

== History ==
KWMC came to air in 1967.
