= KRUI (AM) =

- Ruidoso Downs, New Mexico; United States
- Frequency: 1490 kHz
- Branding: 1490 The Mountain

Programming
- Format: News Talk Information

Ownership
- Owner: Village of Ruidoso, New Mexico

History
- Former call signs: KOAW (1982–1989)

Technical information
- Licensing authority: FCC
- Facility ID: 39523
- Class: C
- Power: 1,000 watts (unlimited)
- Transmitter coordinates: 33°19′17″N 105°35′24″W
- Translator: 99.1 K256AR (Ruidoso)

Links
- Public license information: Public file; LMS
- Website: www.ruidoso-nm.gov/krui-1490-am-the-mountain

KRUI (1490 AM) is a radio station broadcasting a Classic Hits format. Licensed to Ruidoso Downs, New Mexico, United States, the station is currently owned by the Village of Ruidoso New Mexico.

== History ==
The station was assigned the call letters KOAW on 1982-11-17. On 1989-03-01, the station changed its call sign to the current KRUI.
