= KXYL-FM =

Coordinates: 31.7484°N 99.3328°W

- Coleman, Texas; United States
- Broadcast area: Brownwood, Texas
- Frequency: 102.3 MHz
- Branding: News Talk 102.3

Programming
- Format: Talk radio

Ownership
- Owner: Tackett-Boazman Broadcasting LP
- Sister stations: KQBZ; KXYL

Technical information
- Licensing authority: FCC
- Facility ID: 12237
- Class: C2
- ERP: 12,000 watts
- HAAT: 210 meters (690 ft)

Links
- Public license information: Public file; LMS
- Webcast: Listen live
- Website: kxylnews.com

KXYL-FM (102.3 FM) is a radio station licensed to Coleman, Texas. The station broadcasts a talk radio format and is owned by Tackett-Boazman Broadcasting LP.
