= KQBZ =

Radio station in Brownwood, Texas

Currently silent
- Brownwood, Texas; United States
- Broadcast area: Brownwood, Texas
- Frequency: 96.9 MHz
- Branding: 96.9 The Breeze

Programming
- Format: Hot adult contemporary

Ownership
- Owner: Wendlee Broadcasting; (Tackett-Boazman Broadcasting LP)
- Sister stations: KXYL; KXYL-FM

History
- First air date: September 1965
- Former call signs: KXYL-FM (1982–1985); KISJ-FM (1985–1991); KXYL-FM (1991–2010)

Technical information
- Licensing authority: FCC
- Facility ID: 71106
- Class: C1
- ERP: 100,000 watts
- HAAT: 100.9 meters (331 ft)
- Transmitter coordinates: 31°42′16″N 99°0′5″W

Links
- Public license information: Public file; LMS
- Website: wendleebroadcasting.com/kqbz-fm-the-breeze-96-9-fm/

KQBZ (96.9 FM) is a radio station licensed to Brownwood, Texas, United States, serving the Brownwood area. The station is currently owned by Tackett-Boazman Broadcasting LP.

== History ==
The station was assigned the call letters KXYL-FM on September 15, 1982. On June 15, 1985, it changed its call sign to KISJ-FM, then to KXYL-FM on February 4, 1991, and, finally to the current KQBZ on July 1, 2010. On April 28, 2006, the station was sold to Tackett.

On May 29, 2026, KQBZ ceased operations and went silent.
