= KRTN (AM) =

- Raton, New Mexico; United States
- Frequency: 1490 kHz
- Branding: KRTN Radio

Programming
- Format: Adult contemporary
- Affiliations: AP Radio, Jones Radio Network

Ownership
- Owner: Enchanted Air, Inc.
- Sister stations: KRTN-FM

History
- First air date: 1948

Technical information
- Licensing authority: FCC
- Facility ID: 55188
- Class: C
- Power: 1,000 watts
- Transmitter coordinates: 36°53′12.1″N 104°26′37″W

Links
- Public license information: Public file; LMS
- Website: krtnradio.com

KRTN (1490 AM) is a radio station broadcasting an adult contemporary format. It is licensed to Raton, New Mexico, United States. The station is currently owned by Enchanted Air, Inc. and features programming from AP Radio and Jones Radio Network.
