= KRZE =

- Farmington, New Mexico; United States
- Broadcast area: Four Corners area
- Frequency: 1280 kHz
- Branding: FIERRO 1280

Programming
- Format: Regional Mexican

Ownership
- Owner: (Basin Broadcasting Company, Inc.)

History
- First air date: July 17, 1958

Technical information
- Licensing authority: FCC
- Facility ID: 29518
- Class: D
- Power: 5,000 watts (day); 95 watts (night)
- Transmitter coordinates: 36°49′3″N 108°5′47″W
- Translator: 100.9 K278DD (Farmington)

Links
- Public license information: Public file; LMS
- Website: fierro1280.com

KRZE (1280 AM) is a radio station broadcasting a Regional Mexican format. Licensed to Farmington, New Mexico, United States, the station serves the Four Corners area. The station is owned by Basin Broadcasting Company, Inc.

On October 21, 2010, the station's license was cancelled by the Federal Communications Commission, and its call sign deleted from the FCC's database. However, the station continued to broadcast under a special temporary authority while the reinstatement of its license was pending.

On October 10, 2012, the application for extension of the special temporary authority was dismissed. The current license expires October 1, 2021.
