= WZXI =

- Lancaster, Kentucky; United States
- Frequency: 1280 kHz

Programming
- Format: Talk
- Affiliations: Genesis Communications Network; Kentucky Sports Radio; Premiere Networks; Salem Radio Network; Townhall News

Ownership
- Owner: David Greenly; (Eastern Sky LLC)

History
- First air date: 1966 (as WIXI)
- Former call signs: WIXI (1966–1984); WKYY (1984–2015)

Technical information
- Licensing authority: FCC
- Facility ID: 36476
- Class: D
- Power: 1,000 watts day 88 watts night
- Transmitter coordinates: 37°37′56″N 84°34′2″W
- Translators: W231DM (94.1 MHz, Lancaster); W238CN (95.5 MHz, Lancaster)

Links
- Public license information: Public file; LMS
- Webcast: Listen Live
- Website: wzkiradio.com

WZXI (1280 AM) is a radio station broadcasting a talk format. Licensed to Lancaster, Kentucky, United States, the station is owned by David Greenly, through licensee Eastern Sky LLC.
