= WSNT-FM =

- Sandersville, Georgia; United States
- Frequency: 99.9 MHz
- Branding: Real Country Waco 100

Programming
- Format: Country music
- Affiliations: ABC Radio

Ownership
- Owner: Radio Station Wsnt, Inc.

History
- Former call signs: DWSNT-FM (1981–2005)

Technical information
- Licensing authority: FCC
- Facility ID: 54830
- Class: A
- ERP: 3,000 watts
- HAAT: 56 meters
- Transmitter coordinates: 32°58′23.00″N 82°48′34.00″W

Links
- Public license information: Public file; LMS
- Website: waco100fm.com

WSNT-FM (99.9 FM) is a radio station broadcasting a country music format, licensed to Sandersville, Georgia, United States. The station is currently owned by Radio Station Wsnt, Inc. and has programming from ABC Radio.

== History ==
The station went on the air as WSNT-FM on 30 November 1981. On 17 March 2005, the station changed its call sign to DWSNT-FM and on 31 January 2007 to the current WSNT.
