= KNDC =

- Hettinger, North Dakota; United States
- Broadcast area: Southwest North Dakota, Northwest South Dakota, Southeast Montana
- Frequency: 1490 kHz

Programming
- Format: Classic hits

Ownership
- Owner: Schweitzer Media, Inc

History
- First air date: March 1, 1954
- Call sign meaning: North Dakota Classics

Technical information
- Licensing authority: FCC
- Facility ID: 27100
- Class: C
- Power: 1,000 watts (unlimited)
- Transmitter coordinates: 46.018191°N 102.691002°W
- Translator: 106.7 K294DG (Hettinger)

Links
- Public license information: Public file; LMS
- Website: www.kndcradio.com

KNDC (1490 AM) is a radio station licensed to serve Hettinger, North Dakota. The station is owned by Schweitzer Media, Inc. It airs a classic hits format.

The station was assigned the KNDC call letters by the Federal Communications Commission.
