= KRTN-FM =

- Raton, New Mexico; United States
- Frequency: 93.9 MHz
- Branding: KRTN Raton New Mexico 93.9 Stereo FM

Programming
- Format: Variety
- Affiliations: AP Radio, Jones Radio Network

Ownership
- Owner: Enchanted Air, Inc.

Technical information
- Licensing authority: FCC
- Facility ID: 55189
- Class: C1
- ERP: 26,000 watts
- HAAT: 441 meters
- Transmitter coordinates: 36°40′59″N 104°24′50″W

Links
- Public license information: Public file; LMS
- Website: krtnradio.com

KRTN-FM (93.9 FM) is a radio station broadcasting a variety format. Licensed to Enchanted Air, Inc. in Raton, New Mexico, United States. The station is providing services to the communities of Northeastern New Mexico and South-Central Colorado. It has 100 watt booster KRTN-FM1 licensed to Trinidad, Colorado.

== Translator ==
In addition to the main station, KRTN-FM is relayed by an additional translator to widen its broadcast area.

Call sign	Frequency	City of license	FID	ERP (W)	Class	FCC info
K236AK	95.1 FM	Eagle Nest, New Mexico	92013	10	D	LMS
