= KGBA-FM =

Radio station in Holtville, California, United States

- Holtville, California; United States
- Broadcast area: Calexico, California; Mexicali, Baja California
- Frequency: 100.1 MHz

Programming
- Format: Contemporary Christian
- Affiliations: SRN News

Ownership
- Owner: The Voice of International Christian Evangelism, Inc.
- Sister stations: KGBA, KROP

History
- First air date: 1985
- Call sign meaning: Keeping God Before All

Technical information
- Licensing authority: FCC
- Facility ID: 66640
- Class: A
- ERP: 6,000 watts
- HAAT: 100 meters (330 ft)
- Transmitter coordinates: 32°48′10″N 115°29′54″W

Links
- Public license information: Public file; LMS
- Webcast: Listen live
- Website: kgba.org

KGBA-FM (100.1 FM) is a radio station broadcasting a Contemporary Christian format. Licensed to Holtville, California, United States, it serves the Calexico–Mexicali area. The station is currently owned by The Voice of International Christian Evangelism, Inc. and features programming from Salem Communications.
