= KBOB (AM) =

Coordinates: 37°11′45″N 93°19′07″W

- Springfield, Missouri; United States
- Frequency: 1550 kHz
- Branding: 107.5 Bob-FM

Programming
- Format: Adult hits
- Affiliations: Bob FM network

Ownership
- Owner: My Town Media, Inc.

History
- First air date: November 1, 1974 (as KLFJ)
- Former call signs: KLFJ (1974–2016); KRZD (2016–2026)
- Call sign meaning: Bob FM, its format

Technical information
- Licensing authority: FCC
- Facility ID: 17137
- Class: D
- Power: 5,000 watts day; 28 watts night
- Translator: 107.5 K298CI (Springfield)

Links
- Public license information: Public file; LMS
- Webcast: Listen live
- Website: mytown-media.com/stations/107-5-bob-fm/

KBOB (1550 AM) is a radio station licensed to Springfield, Missouri. KBOB airs an adult hits format branded as "107.5 Bob-FM".

As KRZD, the station was historically run by the Branson Ticket Outlet and Welcome Center as a travelers' information station for nearby Branson. Most ads were directed at bringing tourists into the Ticket Center location. Many of the Ticket Outlet's radio spots advertise free soft drinks and email access for tourists as well as a Milton Crabapple compact disc.

On May 20, 2020, KRZD changed its format from Branson travelers' information to mainstream rock, branded as "Z107.5".

On May 26, 2023, KRZD flipped to adult hits, branded as "107.5 Bob-FM". It was acquired by My Town Media, which had been operating it for some time, in 2025. My Town changed the station's call sign to KBOB on June 5, 2026.
