= KHEX =

- Concow, California; United States
- Broadcast area: Chico, California
- Frequency: 100.3 MHz
- Branding: The Outlaw 100.3

Programming
- Format: Classic country

Ownership
- Owner: Independence Rock Media Group; (Independence Rock Media, LLC)
- Sister stations: KAJK, KBLF, KEGE, KGXX, KIQS, KLZN, KRAC, KTOR

History
- First air date: 1998 (as KSPY)
- Former call signs: KZDD (6/1991-10/1991, CP); KSPY (1991–2001); KHWG (2001–2003); KHGQ (2003–2010); KVXX (2010–2012); KBJK (2012–2017)

Technical information
- Licensing authority: FCC
- Facility ID: 31618
- Class: A
- ERP: 1,650 watts
- HAAT: 192 meters (630 ft)
- Transmitter coordinates: 39°46′04″N 121°28′54″W

Links
- Public license information: Public file; LMS
- Webcast: Listen Live
- Website: outlawchico.com

KHEX (100.3 FM) is an American commercial radio station broadcasting a classic country format, licensed to serve the community of Concow, California. The signal serves over a quarter of a million listeners in the Sacramento Valley.

== History ==
In March 1989, John K. La Rue applied to the Federal Communications Commission (FCC) for a construction permit for a new broadcast radio station. The FCC granted this permit on October 15, 1990, with a scheduled expiration date of April 15, 1992. The new station was assigned call sign KZDD on June 14, 1991. A few months later, on October 21, 1991, the station was assigned new call sign KSPY.

In April 1997, permit holder John K. La Rue filed an application to transfer the KSPY construction permit to the Ukiah Broadcasting Corporation. The transfer was approved by the FCC on June 17, 1997, and the transaction formally consummated on July 15, 1997. After a series of extensions and permit modifications, construction and testing were completed in January 1997 and the station was granted its broadcast license on April 21, 1998.

In October 2000, Ukiah Broadcasting Corporation reached a deal to sell KSPY to Keily Miller of Pahrump, Nevada. The FCC approved the sale on February 16, 2001, and the transaction was formally consummated on April 20, 2001. The new owners had the FCC change the station's call sign to KHWG on April 30, 2001. The call sign would be changed again, this time to KHGQ, on September 22, 2003.

In May 2005, Keily Miller applied to the FCC to transfer KHGQ to Hilltop Church as a gift. Hilltop Church was a non-profit organization for which Keily Miller served as both trustee and vice-chairman. The FCC granted the transfer on July 18, 2005, and the transaction was formally consummated the same day. Also on that date, the FCC granted the station a modification of its license from commercial to non-commercial educational.

On May 4, 2008, the station went dark due to staffing issues and the loss of its main studio facility. The station returned briefly to the air on April 30, 2009. On May 3, 2009, KHGQ went dark once again. In the station's application for special temporary authority to remain silent, the station stated it was battling technical issues and seeking to replace its staff. On April 18, 2010, the station reported to the FCC that it had "resumed full operation" with the broadcast studio at the transmitter site. The station went off the air yet again just two days later on April 20, 2010, due to reported inter-modulation problems with KQNC (88.1 FM).

On May 12, 2010, Hilltop Church signed a contract with Sierra Radio, Inc., to transfer the broadcast license for KHGQ in exchange for $50,000. Ownership in Sierra Radio is held 50% by Tom F. Huth and 50% jointly by Gary Katz and Jerrie Rindhal-Katz. The FCC approved the sale of the still-silent station on July 15, 2010, and the deal was formally consummated on September 1, 2010. Also on July 15, 2010, the FCC granted a modification to the station's broadcast license to return KGHQ to commercial operation. The new owners had the FCC change the station's call sign to KVXX on September 17, 2010.

In June 2010, the station had applied for a construction permit to allow it to co-locate its transmitter at the site of broadcast translator K245AU. The station returned to the air, although in a remote location with just 200 watts of effective radiated power, from this essentially temporary facility on April 5, 2011. (The station had remained off the air while an application to relocate to Magalia, California, was pending before the FCC. With no new permit issued and the one-year deadline to resume operations or forfeit its license looming, the new owners took this authorized temporary measure instead.) The station applied for a new license to cover these changes in April 2011. The FCC accepted the application for filing on April 13, 2011, but as of October 14, 2011, have yet to take further action on the application.

On December 14, 2012, the station's call sign was changed to KBJK.

On September 6, 2013, KBJK 100.3 is now broadcasting from Chico, California with an adult hits format, branded as "Jack FM". On December 6, 2013, the station's community of license moved from Quincy, California to Concow.

On June 9, 2014, the station's license was transferred from Sierra Radio to the Thomas Huth Revocable Living Trust.

On February 21, 2017, KBJK changed their call letters to KHEX.

On March 2, 2017, KHEX changed their format to classic country, branded as "100.3 The Outlaw".

In 2020, the station was purchased by Independence Rock Media Group following the passing of station co-owner Tom Huth. The deal, which included eight sister stations and three translators, was consummated on July 24, 2021, at a price of $400,000.
