= KSKR (AM) =

- Roseburg, Oregon; United States
- Frequency: 1490 kHz
- Branding: 1490 The Score

Programming
- Format: Sports
- Affiliations: Westwood One Sports; Oregon State Beavers; Portland Trail Blazers; Sports USA Radio Network

Ownership
- Owner: Brooke Communications, Inc.
- Sister stations: KKMX, KQEN, KRSB-FM, KSKR-FM

History
- First air date: June 1935 (as KRNR)
- Former call signs: KRNR (1935–2008)
- Call sign meaning: K SKoRe ("Score")

Technical information
- Licensing authority: FCC
- Facility ID: 17415
- Class: C
- Power: 1,000 watts
- Transmitter coordinates: 43°11′35″N 123°21′39″W
- Repeater: 92.3 KWRZ (Canyonville)

Links
- Public license information: Public file; LMS
- Webcast: Listen Live
- Website: 1490thescore.com

KSKR (1490 kHz, "The Score") is an AM radio station licensed to serve Roseburg, Oregon, United States. The station, which began broadcasting in 1935, is currently owned by Brooke Communications, Inc.

== Programming ==
KSKR broadcasts a sports format including syndicated programming from CBS Sports Radio. KSKR also carries high school football and other local sporting events as a member of the Table Rock Sports Network.

== History ==
This station began broadcasting in June 1935 under the ownership of the News Review Company, publishers of The News-Review, a daily newspaper also based in Roseburg, Oregon. By 1944, KRNR (for Roseburg's News-Review) was broadcasting with 250 watts of power.

In 1960, the News Review Company placed the station up for sale and on March 1, 1961, it was acquired by Douglas County Tricasters, Inc. In 1963, the station received a construction permit to upgrade its daytime signal strength to 1,000 watts while maintaining a nighttime output of 250 watts. The station broadcast a country & western music format throughout the 1970s.

In October 2004, Douglas County Tricasters, Inc., reached an agreement to sell this station to Brooke Communications, Inc. The deal was approved by the FCC on January 5, 2005, and the transaction was consummated on January 14, 2005.

In 2008 the station dropped its country music format to become a full-time affiliate of ESPN Radio branded as "The Score".KRNR Radio (Country) The station was assigned the current KSKR call sign by the Federal Communications Commission on June 7, 2008.

== Previous logos ==
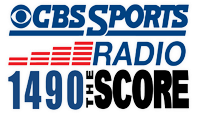
(KSKR's logo under previous ESPN Radio affiliation)
