= KPKE =

- Gunnison, Colorado; United States
- Frequency: 1490 kHz
- Branding: The Peak

Programming
- Format: Country music
- Affiliations: Dial Global, Fox News Radio

Ownership
- Owner: John Harvey Rees

History
- Former call signs: KAON (1996–1996)

Technical information
- Licensing authority: FCC
- Facility ID: 76979
- Class: C
- Power: 1,000 watts unlimited
- Transmitter coordinates: 38°33′57.00″N 106°55′32.00″W
- Translator: (96.7 MHz) K244FR (Gunnison)

Links
- Public license information: Public file; LMS
- Website: www.gunnisonradio.net

KPKE (1490 AM, The Peak) is a radio station broadcasting a country music music format. Licensed to Gunnison, Colorado, United States, the station is currently owned by John Harvey Rees and features programming from Dial Global and Fox News Radio.

== History ==
The station was assigned the call letters KAON on 1996-01-19. On 1996-02-05, the station changed its call sign to the current KPKE.
