= KREA =

Radio station in Honolulu (1973–2024)

- Honolulu, Hawaii; United States
- Frequency: 1540 kHz

Programming
- Language: Korean

Ownership
- Owner: JMK Communications, Inc.

History
- First air date: April 24, 1973
- Last air date: March 1, 2024
- Former call signs: KKEA (1966–2003)
- Call sign meaning: Korea

Technical information
- Facility ID: 39773
- Class: B
- Power: 5,000 watts unlimited
- Transmitter coordinates: 21°19′27″N 157°52′47″W

KREA (1540 AM) was a commercial radio station in Honolulu, Hawaii. It was owned by JMK Communications, Inc. The station operated from 1973 to 2024.

KREA was powered at 5,000 watts, using a non-directional antenna. The transmitter was on Kalani Street in Honolulu, near the Kapalama Canal.

== History ==
The station signed on the air on April 24, 1973. It was originally a daytimer station, required to go off the air at night because 1540 AM is a clear channel frequency. The call sign was KISA and it offered a Filipino format. It was owned by Manayan Enterprises. It changed its call letters to KREA in 2000, beginning its Korean format.

KREA ceased broadcasting on March 1, 2024. The Federal Communications Commission cancelled the station's license on September 3, 2025.
