= KXYL (AM) =

- Brownwood, Texas; United States
- Broadcast area: Brownwood, Texas
- Frequency: 1240 kHz

Programming
- Format: News-talk

Ownership
- Owner: Rex & Mariann Tackett - Ray Boazman; (Tackett-Boazman Broadcasting LP)
- Sister stations: KXYL-FM; KQBZ-FM

Technical information
- Licensing authority: FCC
- Facility ID: 71105
- Class: C
- Power: 1,000 watts unlimited
- Transmitter coordinates: 31°42′21″N 98°59′45″W

Links
- Public license information: Public file; LMS
- Webcast: Listen live
- Website: www.kxyl-am.com

KXYL (1240 AM) is a radio station broadcasting a news-talk format. Licensed to Brownwood, Texas, United States, the station serves the Brownwood area. The station is owned by Tackett-Boazman Broadcasting LP.
