= KGBA (AM) =

Spanish-language radio station in Heber, California, United States

- Heber, California; United States
- Broadcast area: Imperial Valley, California; Mexicali, Baja California
- Frequency: 1490 kHz
- Branding: KGBA 1490 AM

Programming
- Format: Spanish Christian Radio

Ownership
- Owner: The Voice of International Christian Evangelism, Inc.
- Sister stations: KGBA-FM, KROP

Technical information
- Licensing authority: FCC
- Facility ID: 8174
- Class: C
- Power: 1,000 watts
- Transmitter coordinates: 32°44′32″N 115°33′11″W
- Translator: 100.5 K263CC (Heber)

Links
- Public license information: Public file; LMS
- Webcast: Listen Live
- Website: 1490am.kgba.org

KGBA (1490 kHz) is an AM radio station licensed to Heber, California, and serving the Imperial Valley as well as Mexicali, Baja California, Mexico. The station is owned by The Voice of International Christian Evangelism, Inc. It airs a Spanish-language Christian radio format.

KGBA has an FM counterpart, 100.1 KGBA-FM in Holtville. It airs an English-language Christian radio format. Both stations depend on listeners sending in donations to support the radio ministries heard on the stations.

== History ==
The station signed on as KICO in 1947. It was originally licensed to Calexico and was only powered at 250 watts. KICO was owned by Charles Love, who also served as the General Manager.

It changed its call sign to KGBA in 2007.
