= KEGE (FM) =

Radio station in Hamilton City, California

- Hamilton City, California; United States
- Broadcast area: Chico, California
- Frequency: 101.7 MHz
- Branding: X Radio Mexico La Gran 101.7

Programming
- Format: Regional Mexican

Ownership
- Owner: Independence Rock Media Group; (Independence Rock Media, LLC)
- Sister stations: KAJK, KBLF, KGXX, KHEX, KIQS, KLZN, KRAC, KTOR

History
- First air date: 2005
- Former call signs: KRER (2005–2011); KCKS (2011–2013); KVXX (2013–2017); KSOJ (2017)
- Call sign meaning: "The Edge" (previous format)

Technical information
- Licensing authority: FCC
- Facility ID: 164155
- Class: A
- ERP: 530 watts
- HAAT: 335 meters (1,099 ft)
- Transmitter coordinates: 39°56′46″N 121°43′17″W

Links
- Public license information: Public file; LMS
- Webcast: Listen live

KEGE (101.7 FM) is a radio station broadcasting a regional Mexican format. Licensed to Hamilton City, California, United States, the station serves the Chico area.

== History ==
The station began on KEWE, which had previously played jazz and blues music before switching its format to sports talk. The branding would become known as the SportsFan 1340. However, the signal was extremely weak, so management switched formats and bands in 2006. The FM station remained as KRER while KEWE returned to the ESPN Radio format at 1340.

The station was the flagship station for Butte College Roadrunner football (with Mike Wessels) and covers local high school sports (with Mike Baca) alongside its sister station KPAY. They also began coverage of the annual Lions Club All-Star Football Game in Redding in 2006 representing the South All-Stars. (The North All-Stars radio representation is KNTK of Mt. Shasta). They are also the local affiliate of the NBA's Sacramento Kings Radio Network. During the 2007 and 2008 seasons, the station became the flagship station for local Golden Baseball League baseball team, the Chico Outlaws with Rory Miller on the call. Currently, the station is a radio affiliate of the San Francisco Giants.

On February 24, 2011, the then-KCKS changed their format to top 40, branded as "Kiss FM". They were the second station in the Chico market to flip to Top 40, joining KCEZ, which flipped on February 22, 2011.

On February 4, 2012, KCKS switched back to a sports format.

On September 24, 2013, KCKS switched to an adult alternative music format, branded as "Radio 101.7".

On December 10, 2013, KCKS changed their call letters to KVXX, and the station was branded as X 101.7. The station aired an adult alternative music format and was the flagship over-the-air station for Chico Heat baseball. The station changed its call sign to KSOJ on February 21, 2017. On February 28, 2017, KSOJ changed their format to talk, branded as "Super Talk 101.7".

On May 25, 2017, KSOJ changed their format from talk to alternative rock, branded as "101.7 The Edge". The station changed to the KEGE call sign on May 29, 2017.

On August 1, 2019, KEGE changed their format from alternative rock to hot adult contemporary, branded as "Hot Hits 101.7".

In 2020, KEGE change their format from hot adult contemporary to regional mexican format, and rebranded to X Radio Mexico La Gran 101.7.
