= KNEL (AM) =

Coordinates: 31.1301°N 99.3228°W

- Brady, Texas; United States
- Frequency: 1490 kHz
- Branding: 95.3 FM 1490 AM

Programming
- Format: Oldies

Ownership
- Owner: Farris Broadcasting, Inc.
- Sister stations: KNEL-FM

History
- First air date: 1935

Technical information
- Licensing authority: FCC
- Facility ID: 59540
- Class: C
- Power: 1,000 watts

Links
- Public license information: Public file; LMS
- Webcast: Listen Live
- Website: knelradio.com

KNEL (1490 AM) is a radio station licensed to Brady, Texas. The station broadcasts an Oldies format and is owned by Farris Broadcasting, Inc.
