= KPRV (AM) =

- Poteau, Oklahoma; United States
- Broadcast area: Fort Smith, Arkansas
- Frequency: 1280 kHz

Programming
- Format: Soft oldies; Adult standards
- Affiliations: Westwood One; America's Best Music

Ownership
- Owner: Leroy and JoAnn Billy
- Sister stations: KPRV-FM

History
- First air date: November 25, 1953
- Call sign meaning: Poteau River Valley

Technical information
- Licensing authority: FCC
- Facility ID: 37089
- Class: D
- Power: 1,000 watts (day); 108 watts (night)
- Transmitter coordinates: 35°0′55.4″N 94°39′06.8″W

Links
- Public license information: Public file; LMS
- Website: www.kprvradio.com

KPRV (1280 AM) is a radio station licensed to Poteau, Oklahoma, United States, and serving the Ft. Smith, Arkansas, area. Currently owned by Leroy and JoAnn Billy, the station features a soft oldies and adult standards format, carrying Westwood One's "America's Best Music" service. The station's studios and property are located at a house on the former site of a drive-in theater in Poteau.

== History ==
The station signed on the air on November 25, 1953. The original call sign was KLCO.

KPRV is a family-owned and operated radio station. Owners LeRoy and JoAnn Billy provide local communities with current weather and news. The station also provides coverage of local high school sporting events.
