= KRSB-FM =

Radio station in Roseburg, Oregon

- Roseburg, Oregon; United States
- Broadcast area: Roseburg, Oregon
- Frequency: 103.1 MHz
- Branding: Best Country 103

Programming
- Format: Country

Ownership
- Owner: Brooke Communications, Inc.

History
- First air date: October 1, 1970
- Former call signs: KRSB (1970–1985)
- Call sign meaning: RoSeBurg

Technical information
- Licensing authority: FCC
- Facility ID: 7119
- Class: A
- ERP: 2,750 watts
- HAAT: 94 meters (308 ft)
- Transmitter coordinates: 43°12′24″N 123°21′47″W
- Translator: 103.9 K280BJ (Sutherlin)

Links
- Public license information: Public file; LMS
- Webcast: Listen Live
- Website: bestcountryfm.com

KRSB-FM (103.1 FM, "Best Country 103") is a radio station licensed to serve Roseburg, Oregon, United States. The station, established in 1970, is currently owned by Brooke Communications, Inc. The station gained worldwide attention in the 1970s for its "Goat Weather Forecasts" based on the movement of local wild goats.

== Programming ==
The station's initial format was a mix of middle of the road and contemporary music. By the end of the 1970s, the format had transitioned to a more modern adult contemporary music mix with up to four hours of jazz music broadcast each week.

KRSB-FM currently broadcasts a contemporary country music format.

== History ==
This station began regular operations on October 1, 1970, broadcasting with 2,750 watts of effective radiated power on a frequency of 103.1 MHz. The station was assigned the call sign KRSB by the Federal Communications Commission. Under the ownership of W.R.R., Inc., KRSB was run by Tom Worden who served as general manager, program director, and company president while Bob Reese took on the job of chief engineer for the station.

To accommodate the rebranding of a co-owned AM sister station as KRSB, the FM station was assigned the KRSB-FM call sign by the FCC on December 10, 1985.

In May 1986, W.R.R., Inc., reached an agreement to sell this station to Michael R. Wyatt. The deal was approved by the FCC on July 2, 1987, and the transaction was consummated the same day.

In February 1989, Michael R. Wyatt reached an agreement to sell this station to Broadcast Management Services, Inc. The deal was approved by the FCC on March 1, 1989, and the transaction was consummated on March 10, 1989. This ownership change would prove short-lived as six days later, on March 16, 1989, Broadcast Management Services, Inc., filed an application with the FCC to transfer the broadcast license for KRSB-FM to Brooke Communications, Inc. The new deal was approved by the FCC on April 28, 1989, and the transaction was consummated on May 8, 1989.

In 1991, KRSB-FM changed from Adult Contemporary to Top 40, under the “B103” branding. This format was moved from AM sister station; “Q124” 1240 KQEN, which became Soft Adult Contemporary. In April 1992, KRSB-FM became “Country 103” with a Country format. Later in the 90’s, it was modified to the current “Best Country 103” branding.

== Weather goats ==
KRSB gained national and international attention in the 1970s for their "Goat Weather Forecasts", based on the behavior of wild goats grazing on Mount Nebo, near Interstate 5. Visible from the station's studio, if the goats were high on the hill it meant fair weather. If the goats were grazing near the bottom of the hill, the forecast would call for rain. Station manager Tom Worden told interviewers that the goats were right about 90 percent of the time while the National Weather Service forecasts from distant Portland, Oregon, were only about 65 percent accurate.

While the station did still deliver the conventional scientific weather forecasts from the National Weather Service, the Goat Weather Reports included less scientific terms like "widely scattered goats" for mostly sunny skies and "low goat pressure" as a sign of rain and stormy weather ahead. By the end of the 1970s, as both traffic along Interstate 5 and accidents involving goats increased, the herd was relocated to a local ranch about 15 miles away from Mount Nebo.

== Station alumni ==
Tom Worden, then the general manager of KRSB and KYES, served as the president of the Oregon Association of Broadcasters for the 1983 calendar year.

== Translators ==
KRSB-FM programming is also carried on a broadcast translator station to extend or improve the coverage area of the station.

Broadcast translator for KRSB-FM
Call sign	Frequency	City of license	FID	ERP (W)	Class	FCC info
K280BJ	103.9 FM	Sutherlin, Oregon	7117	4	D	LMS
