= List of religious radio stations =

The following is a list of religious radio stations divided by country.

== American Samoa ==
- KKBT Leone
- KSBS-FM Pago Pago

== Argentina ==
- FM Santa Rosa Pilar, Buenos Aires Province
- Radio Betania Pilar, Buenos Aires Province
- Radio Buenos Aires Buenos Aires

== Australia ==
- 1WAY FM - Canberra, Australian Capital Territory
- 96five - Brisbane, Queensland
- 97seven - Darwin, Northern Territory
- Faith FM - Australia wide
- Hope103.2 - Sydney, New South Wales
- Juice107.3 - Gold Coast, Queensland
- Life FM - Adelaide, South Australia
- Life FM - Sale, Victoria
- Light FM - Melbourne, Victoria
- Rhema FM - Newcastle, New South Wales
- Rhema FM - Manning Great Lakes, New South Wales
- Rhema FM - Wide Bay–Burnett, Queensland
- Sonshine FM - Perth, Western Australia
- Ultra106five - Hobart, Tasmania
- Vision Radio Network - Australia wide
- Way FM - Launceston, Tasmania
- 96three - Geelong, Victoria
- HCJB - Kununurra, Western Australia
- Life FM - Wagga Wagga, New South Wales
- Live99.9 - Townsville, Queensland
- Pulse94.1 - Wollongong, New South Wales

== Bosnia and Herzegovina ==
- Radiopostaja Mir Međugorje – Catholic radio www.radio-medjugorje.com
- Radio Marija – Catholic radio www.radiomarija.ba
- Radio BIR – Islamic radio www.bir.ba

== Canada ==
See List of Christian radio stations in Canada.

== Croatia ==
- Radio Marija – Catholic radio www.radiomarija.hr
- Croatian Catholic Radio – Christian radio

== Cuba ==
- Radio Maria de la Caridad – Catholic radio https://www.atom.bio/radiomariadelacaridad

== Cyprus ==
- Logos Radio

== Finland ==
- Radio Dei

== Germany ==
- ERF Radio

== Guam ==
- KHMG Barrigada
- KOLG Hagåtña
- KSDA Agat (Adventist World Radio)
- KTWG Agana (Trans World Radio)

== Iceland ==
- Lindin (also heard in the Faroe Islands)

== Ireland ==
- Radio North/Gospel 846am http://www.radionorth.net
- Spirit Radio
- Let The Bible Speak

http://www.ltbs.tv

== Israel ==
- Kol BaRama
- Kol Chai
- Radio Agape

== Italy ==
- PfarrRadio Schlern
- Radio Evangelo Piemonte
- Radio Maria
- Radio Mater
- Radio In Blu (mainly as Radio syndication)
- Radio Torino Biblica

== Japan ==
- FEBC Japan - Christian Radio
- JOQR-AM - Catholic/Shintoist/Buddhist (Soka Gakkai). (Society of St. Paul is the majority owner.)

== Korea, South ==
- Won Buddhism Broadcasting System (Wonmu Banseong) - FM Radio, Won Buddhism ()

== Malaysia ==
- Immanuel FM

https://immanuelfmy.wixsite.com/immanuelfm

== Mauritania ==
- Radio Qur'an

== Montenegro ==
- Radio Fatih - Islamic radio
- Radio Svetigora - Orthodox Church radio www.svetigora.com

== New Zealand ==
- Life FM (Radio Network)
- Star (Radio Network)
- Rhema (Radio Network)
- United Christian Broadcasters

== Philippines ==
- 99.9 Country Baguio
- 105.3 Iloilo
- DWGV Angeles City
- DWIZ Metro Manila
- DWXI Metro Manila
- DXVP Zamboanga City
- DYMI 94.7 Calinog, Iloilo
- DYSA-AM Iloilo
- DZAR Metro Manila
- DZAS Metro Manila
- DZEC Metro Manila
- DZEM Metro Manila
- DZJV Calabarzon
- DZME Metro Manila
- DZMM Metro Manila
- DZRJ-AM Metro Manila
- DZRV Metro Manila
- DZXL Metro Manila
- Master's Touch 98.7
- Power 92.7 San Fernando
- DXGN 89.9 FM Davao City

== Poland ==
- Radio Maryja
- Radio RDN

== Portugal ==
- Rádio Maria – Catholic radio www.radiomaria.pt
- Rádio Canção Nova – Catholic radio radio.cancaonova.pt

== Puerto Rico ==
- WBMJ San Juan
- WCGB Juana Díaz
- WCRP Guayama
- WIDA-FM Carolina
- WIVV Vieques
- WNRT Manatí
- WNVM Cidra
- WPPC Peñuelas
- WTPM Aguadilla
- WYAS Luquillo

== Serbia ==
- Радио Слово Љубве - Orthodox Church radio www.slovoljubve.com

== Spain ==
- Radio María – Catholic radio

== The Vatican ==
- Vatican Radio

== Trinidad and Tobago ==
- Radio Jaagriti 102.7 FM

== United Kingdom ==
- Hope FM - Adventist Hope Media on DAB: Lincolnshire (Block:12A), North Yorkshire(Block:10C), NE Wales W Chesh (Block:10D), Hereford-Worcs (Block:12A) website
- Hope FM Bournemouth
- Cross Rhythms City Radio
- Cross Rhythms Plymouth
- Radio Cracker
- Premier Christian Radio on Sky Channel 0123 website
- Revival FM (Scotland)
- TWR-UK (Trans World Radio) Christian Radio on Freeview 733, Freesat 790, Sky Channel 0128 website
- United Christian Broadcasters Talk Christian Radio on Sky Channel 0135 website
- United Christian Broadcasters UK Christian Radio on Sky Channel 0125 website
- Flame CCR Christian Community Radio from the Wirral website
- Lancashire's Lighthouse Radio
- Radio Outreach
- Voice Of Islam Radio, VOI website

== United States ==
- Air 1 (Network) Rocklin, California Stations: KAGT, WAWE
- American Family Radio (Network) Tupelo, Mississippi
- Bible Broadcasting Network Charlotte, North Carolina
- enLighten (XM)
- EWTN Radio, Irondale, Alabama
- WEWN Shortwave Radio, Irondale, Alabama (International shortwave service of EWTN Radio)
- Family Radio Oakland, California (Network) Stations: KEAR (AM), KECR, KFRN, WCUE, and WFME-FM
- WYFR Okeechobee, Florida (International shortwave service of Family Radio—now closed and transmitters sold to WRMI: Radio Miami International) < http://mt-shortwave.blogspot.com/2013/06/wyfr-to-close-all-shortwave-services.html> <http://mt-shortwave.blogspot.com/2013/11/wyfr-facility-to-return-to-shortwave-as.html>
- Family Talk XM Satellite Radio (Salem Communications)
- KAFC Anchorage, Alaska
- KAGV Big Lake, Alaska
- KAIM-FM Honolulu, Hawaii (Salem Communications)
- KANI Wharton, Texas
- KANN Roy, Utah
- KATH (AM) Dallas, Texas
- KBIQ Manitou Springs, Colorado (Salem Communications)
- KBHL Osakis, Minnesota
- KBJD Denver, Colorado (Salem Communications)
- KBVM Portland, Oregon
- KCMM Belgrade, Montana
- KCRO Omaha, Nebraska (Salem Communications)
- KDAR Oxnard, California (Salem Communications)
- KDNW Duluth, Minnesota
- KDOV Medford, Oregon
- KEXS Excelsior Springs, Missouri
- KFAX San Francisco, California (Salem Communications)
- KFEL Pueblo, Colorado
- KFIA Carmichael, California (Salem Communications)
- KFIS Scappoose, Oregon (Salem Communications)
- KFNW-FM Fargo, North Dakota
- KFSH-FM Anaheim, California (Salem Communications)
- KFSI Rochester, Minnesota
- KGBI-FM Omaha, Nebraska (Salem Communications)
- KGFT Pueblo, Colorado (Salem Communications)
- KGNW Seattle, Washington (Salem Communications)
- KGTN-LP Georgetown, Texas
- KGU Honolulu, Hawaii (Salem Communications)
- KHOY Laredo, Texas
- KHPE Albany, Oregon
- KHRT Minot, North Dakota
- KICY Nome, Alaska
- KICY-FM Nome, Alaska
- KJOL Grand Junction, Colorado
- KJON Carrollton, Texas
- KJVA-LP San Bernardino, California
- KKEQ Fosston, Minnesota
- KKHT-FM Winnie, Texas (Salem Communications)
- KKJM St. Joseph, Minnesota
- KKLA-FM Los Angeles, California (Salem Communications)
- KKMS Richfield, Minnesota (Salem Communications)
- KKSP Bryant, Arkansas
- KLBE-LP Bismarck, North Dakota
- KLFE Seattle, Washington (Salem Communications)
- K-LOVE Winchester, Oregon (Network) Stations: KAKL, KKLC, KLBF, KLDQ, KLFV, KLRX, KLVB, KLVU, KVID, KVKL, KVLB, KYLV, WAKL, WBKL, WKVB, WKVE, WKVK, WKVW, WLKB, WLKU, WLVE, WYDA, and WZLV
- KLUX Corpus Christi, Texas (Diocesan Telecommunications, Catholic Communications Network)
- KLTY Arlington, Texas (Salem Communications)
- KMTL Sherwood, Arkansas
- KMZL Missoula, Montana
- KMZO Hamilton, Montana
- KNDR Bismarck, North Dakota
- KNLR Bend, Oregon
- KNLS Anchor Point, Alaska
- KNOM Nome, Alaska
- KOOV Kempner, Texas (Armor of God Catholic Radio Network)
- KPDQ (AM) Portland, Oregon (Salem Communications)
- KPDQ-FM Portland, Oregon (Salem Communications)
- KPHN El Dorado, Kansas
- KPOF AM91 Denver's Point of Faith Westminster, Colorado website
- KPUL Winterset, Iowa
- KQOV-LP Butte, Montana
- KPSH Coachella, California
- KPRZ San Marcos-Poway, California (Salem Communications)
- KPXQ Glendale, Arizona (Salem Communications)
- KRFF-LP Moorhead, Minnesota
- KRKS, KRKS-FM Denver, Colorado (Salem Communications)
- KSGN Riverside, California
- KSLR San Antonio, Texas (Salem Communications)
- KSOS Las Vegas, Nevada
- KSPH Springhill, Louisiana
- KTIS Minneapolis/St. Paul
- KTIS-FM Minneapolis/St. Paul
- KTLW Lancaster, California
- KVOH Rancho Simi, California
- KVRP (AM) Stamford, Texas
- KWND Springfield, Missouri
- KWTL Grand Forks, North Dakota
- KWRD-FM Highland Village, Texas (Salem Communications)
- KYFG Omaha, Nebraska
- Northern Christian Radio Gaylord, Michigan
- Pilgrim Radio (Network) Stations: KCSP-FM and KNIS
- Radio Maria (USA) (KJMJ Alexandria, Louisiana
- Radio Paz Miami, Florida
- Radio Peace Miami, Florida
- Relevant Radio Green Bay, Wisconsin (Network) Stations: KVXR, WDVM, WJOK, WKBM, WLOL, WMMA-FM, and WSJP-FM
- Smile FM (Network) Stations: WAIR, WCZE, WLGH
- Spirit (XM)
- The Catholic Channel (XS)
- The Message (XM)
- The Station of the Cross (Network) Stations: WHIC, WLOF
- The Torch (XM)
- Trans World Radio Cary, North Carolina
- KTBN (shortwave) Salt Lake City, Utah (International shortwave service of KTBN)
- VCY America Radio Network Milwaukee, Wisconsin
- WACQ Tuskegee, Alabama
- WAFJ Augusta, Georgia
- WAFS (AM) Atlanta, Georgia (Salem Communications)
- WAGG Birmingham, Alabama
- WAKW Cincinnati, Ohio
- WAML (AM) Laurel, Mississippi
- WAMV Amherst, Virginia
- WAVA Arlington, Virginia (Salem Communications)
- WAVA-FM Arlington, Virginia (Salem Communications)
- WAYF West Palm Beach, Florida
- WAYH Harvest, Alabama
- WAYK Valley Station, Kentucky (Salem Communications)
- WBIB Centreville, Alabama
- WBOZ Woodbury, Tennessee (Salem Communications)
- WBTG-FM Sheffield, Alabama
- WBVM Tampa, Florida
- WBXB Edenton, North Carolina
- WCAR Livonia, Michigan
- WCGL Jacksonville, Florida
- WCKI Greer, South Carolina
- WCLN-FM Elizabethtown, North Carolina
- WCMD-FM Barre, Vermont
- WCPK Chesapeake, Virginia
- WCPS Tarboro, North Carolina
- WCRJ Jacksonville, Florida
- WCSG Grand Rapids, Michigan
- WCVC Tallahassee, Florida
- WCVK Bowling Green, Kentucky
- WCVO Gahanna, Ohio
- WDEO (AM) Ypsilanti, Michigan
- WDSA Dothan, Alabama
- WDTF-LP Berkeley Springs, West Virginia
- WEAF (AM) Camden, South Carolina
- WEXY Wilton Manors, Florida
- WEUP (AM) Huntsville, Alabama
- WEUV Moulton, Alabama
- WEZE Boston, Massachusetts (Salem Communications)
- WFBM-LP Lewistown, Pennsylvania
- WFFH Nashville, Tennessee (Salem Communications)
- WFFI Nashville, Tennessee (Salem Communications)
- WFHM-FM Cleveland, Ohio (Salem Communications)
- WFIA Louisville, Kentucky
- WFIL Philadelphia, Pennsylvania (Salem Communications)
- WFSH-FM Athens, Georgia (Salem Communications)
- WGOK Mobile, Alabama
- WGPL Portsmouth, Virginia
- WGRB Chicago, Illinois
- WHBB Selma, Alabama
- WHIF Palatka, Florida
- WHKW Cleveland, Ohio (Salem Communications)
- WHKZ Warren, Ohio (Salem Communications)
- WHLY South Bend, Indiana
- WHMA (AM) Anniston, Alabama
- World Harvest Radio International Cypress Creek, South Carolina
- WIDU Fayetteville, North Carolina
- WIGN Bristol, Tennessee
- WIHM Taylorville, Illinois
- WILB Canton, Ohio
- WIMG Trenton, New Jersey
- WJOU Huntsville, Alabama
- WJUS Marion, Alabama
- WLGK New Albany, Indiana
- WLPS-FM Lumberton, North Carolina
- WLQV Detroit, Michigan (Salem Communications)
- WLTA Alpharetta, Georgia (Salem Communications)
- WMCA New York, New York (Salem Communications)
- WNHG Grand Rapids, Michigan
- WNIV Atlanta, Georgia (Salem Communications)
- WNOP Cincinnati, Ohio
- WOAD (AM) Jackson, Mississippi
- WONG Canton, Mississippi
- WOOF (AM) Dothan, Alabama
- WORD-FM Pittsburgh, Pennsylvania (Salem Communications)
- WPCE Portsmouth, Virginia
- WPMH Newport News, Virginia
- WRBZ Wetumpka, Alabama
- WRCS Ahoskie, North Carolina
- WREN Carrollton, Alabama
- WRFD Columbus, Ohio (Salem Communications)
- WRKS Pickens, Mississippi
- WRMK Augusta, Georgia
- WRMQ Rejoice, Orlando, Florida (Q Broadcasting - Rejoice)
- WROL Boston, Massachusetts (Salem Communications)
- WRYT Edwardsville, Illinois
- WSEL-FM Pontotoc, Mississippi
- WSOK Savannah, Georgia
- WTBN Pinellas Park, Florida (Salem Communications)
- WTLN Orlando, Florida (Salem Communications)
- WTSK Tuscaloosa, Alabama
- WTUA St. Stephen, South Carolina
- WUAF-LP Lake City, Florida
- WVTJ Pensacola, Florida
- WWEV Cumming, Georgia
- WWCR Worldwide Christian Radio Nashville, Tennessee
- WWDJ Boston, Massachusetts (Salem Communications)
- WWOS Walterboro, South Carolina
- WWOW Conneaut, Ohio
- WXKD Monroeville, Alabama
- WXQW Fairhope, Alabama
- WYCA Crete, Illinois
- WYCV Granite Falls, North Carolina
- WYLL Chicago, Illinois (Salem Communications)
- WYLS York, Alabama
- WYNN (AM) Florence, South Carolina
- WZAZ Jacksonville, Florida

== U.S. Virgin Islands ==
- WDHP Frederiksted
- WEVI Frederiksted
- WGOD-FM Charlotte Amalie
- WIVH Christiansted
