= List of radio stations formerly owned by the American Broadcasting Company =

From June 1945 until the 2023 sale of KRDC in Los Angeles, the American Broadcasting Company owned and/or operated several radio stations in numerous markets throughout the United States, big and small. The station portfolio for the ABC Radio Network further grew in 1986 when the network was acquired by Capital Cities Communications and became Capital Cities/ABC; The Walt Disney Company then purchased Capital Cities/ABC in 1996. Further expansion of the radio division occurred with the launches of ESPN Radio in 1992 and Radio Disney in 1996, both of which had owned-and-operated stations held directly by Disney/ABC.

In 2005, ABC began to explore the sale of its radio division. The two leading competitors for the purchase of the network, which included twenty-two of ABC Radio's top stations, as well as ABC's talk and music networks, were Entercom Communications and Forstmann Little & Company's Citadel Broadcasting unit. Citadel was chosen as the top bidder and the deal to purchase the stations and the network was struck in February 2006.

The deal did not include Radio Disney or ESPN Radio, or their owned-stations. The ABC name, which also remained in Disney's hands, was licensed to Citadel for two years. Disney's ABC News unit continued to produce ABC News Radio programming for distribution by Citadel. The acquisition of ABC Radio by Citadel Broadcasting was officially completed on June 12, 2007.

Disney/ABC initiated plans in late 2014 to sell off their Radio Disney stations in order to focus on digital platforms; KDIS in Los Angeles was the only station retained. While the Radio Disney stations were all initially planned to be taken silent, this was quickly reversed and the stations continued to carry network programming. The sales were completed by September 2015. KDIS switched to carrying Radio Disney Country in 2017 as KRDC, Radio Disney and Radio Disney Country were both closed down in late 2020. The ESPN Radio stations—WEPN, KSPN, WMVP, and WEPN-FM's local marketing agreement—were sold by Disney/ABC to Good Karma Brands, while KESN was sold to VCY America. KRDC was sold to Calvary Chapel Costa Mesa on June 12, 2023, for $5 million, the station simulcast KSPN during the sale process.

== ABC Radio stations ==
Media market	State/District	Station	Purchased	Sold	Notes
Los Angeles	California	KMPC	1995	1997	(Note: Became a Radio Disney station in 1997.)
Los Angeles	California	KABC	1945	2007	
Los Angeles	California	KLOS	1947	2007	
San Francisco	California	KGO	1945	2007	
San Francisco	California	KSFO	1995	2007	
San Francisco	California	KSFX	1947	1984	
Washington, D.C.	District of Columbia	WJZW	1997	2007	
Washington, D.C.	District of Columbia	WMAL	1977	2007	
Washington, D.C.	District of Columbia	WRQX	1977	2007	
Atlanta	Georgia	WKHX	1986	1996	(Note: Became a Radio Disney station in 1996.)
Atlanta	Georgia	WKHX-FM	1986	2007	
Atlanta	Georgia	WYAY	1993	2007	
Chicago	Illinois	WENR	1945	1954	(Note: Time-share operation with WLS; merged into WLS in 1954.)
Chicago	Illinois	WLS	1954	2007	
Chicago	Illinois	WLS-FM	1948	2007	
Detroit	Michigan	WDRQ	1997	2007	
Detroit	Michigan	WDVD	1986	2007	
Detroit	Michigan	WJR	1986	2007	
Detroit	Michigan	WRIF	1948	1986	
Detroit	Michigan	WXYZ	1946	1984	
Minneapolis–Saint Paul	Minnesota	KQRS	1986	1996	
Minneapolis–Saint Paul	Minnesota	KQRS-FM	1986	2007	
Minneapolis–Saint Paul	Minnesota	KXXR	1994	2007	
Minneapolis–Saint Paul	Minnesota	WGVX	1997	2007	(Note: All three stations operated as a simulcast.)
Minneapolis–Saint Paul	Minnesota	WGVY	1997	2007	(Note: All three stations operated as a simulcast.)
Minneapolis–Saint Paul	Minnesota	WGVZ	1997	2007	(Note: All three stations operated as a simulcast.)
New York City	New York	WABC	1945	2007	
New York City	New York	WPLJ	1948	2007	
Fremont	Ohio	WFRO	2002	2004	(Note: Operated by BAS Broadcasting. Taken off the air in 2004 to allow for a power upgrade with WFDF.)
Pittsburgh	Pennsylvania	KQV	1957	1974	
Pittsburgh	Pennsylvania	WDVE	1962	1974	
Providence	Rhode Island	WPRO	1986	1993	
Providence	Rhode Island	WPRO-FM	1986	1993	
Dallas–Fort Worth	Texas	KSCS	1986	2007	
Dallas–Fort Worth	Texas	KTYS	1998	2007	
Dallas–Fort Worth	Texas	WBAP	1986	2007	
Houston	Texas	KAUM	1968	1986	
Houston	Texas	KXYZ	1968	1979	

== Radio Disney stations ==
Media market	State	Station	Purchased	Sold	Notes
Mobile	Alabama	WQUA	2002	2005	
Phoenix	Arizona	KMIK	1998	2015	
Little Rock	Arkansas	KDIS-FM	2003	2014	
Los Angeles	California	KDIS	1997	2003	
Los Angeles	California	KDIS	2000	2017	(Note: Switched to Radio Disney Country as KRDC in 2017.)
Los Angeles	California	KRDC	2020	2023	(Note: Simulcast KSPN from 2021 until it was sold in 2023.)
Sacramento	California	KIID	2000	2015	
San Francisco	California	KMKY	1997	2015	
Denver	Colorado	KDDZ	1998	2015	
Hartford–New Haven	Connecticut	WDZK	2000	2010	
Jacksonville	Florida	WBWL	2002	2010	
Miami–Fort Lauderdale	Florida	WMYM	1999	2015	
Orlando	Florida	WDYZ	2001	2015	
Tampa–St. Petersburg	Florida	WWMI	1999	2015	
West Palm Beach	Florida	WMNE	2000	2010	
Atlanta	Georgia	WDWD	1996	2015	
Chicago	Illinois	WRDZ	1999	2015	
Chicago	Illinois	WPJX	1998	2002	
Indianapolis	Indiana	WRDZ-FM	2003	2015	
Wichita–Hutchinson	Kansas	KQAM	2002	2010	
Louisville	Kentucky	WDRD	2002	2010	
New Orleans	Louisiana	WBYU	2003	2011	
Boston	Massachusetts	WMKI	2000	2015	
Detroit	Michigan	WFDF	2002	2015	
Minneapolis–Saint Paul	Minnesota	KDIZ	1996	2015	
St. Louis	Missouri	WSDZ	1998	2015	
Albuquerque	New Mexico	KALY	2003	2010	
Albany–Schenectady	New York	WDDY	2002	2014	
New York	New York	WQEW	2007	2015	(Note: Owned by the New York Times Company until 2007.)
Charlotte	North Carolina	WGFY	2000	2015	
Greensboro–Winston-Salem	North Carolina	WCOG	2005	2010	
Cleveland	Ohio	WWMK	1998	2015	
Tulsa	Oklahoma	KMUS	2003	2011	
Portland	Oregon	KDZR	2003	2015	
Philadelphia	Pennsylvania	WWJZ	1999	2015	
Pittsburgh	Pennsylvania	WDDZ	2011	2015	
Providence	Rhode Island	WDDZ	2001	2010	
Dallas–Fort Worth	Texas	KMKI	1998	2015	
Houston	Texas	KMIC	1999	2015	
San Antonio	Texas	KRDY	2003	2014	
Salt Lake City	Utah	KWDZ	2003	2015	
Norfolk	Virginia	WHKT	2002	2010	
Richmond	Virginia	WDZY	2000	2013	
Seattle–Tacoma	Washington	KKDZ	1998	2015	
Milwaukee	Wisconsin	WKSH	2002	2014	

== ESPN Radio stations ==
Media market	State	Station	Purchased	Sold	Notes
Los Angeles	California	KSPN	2000	2003	(Note: Also simulcast KSPN from 2022 to 2023 as KRDC.)
Los Angeles	California	KSPN	2003	2022	
Chicago	Illinois	WMVP	1998	2022	
New York City	New York	WEPN	2001	2022	(Note: Owned by The Forward and known as WEVD prior to 2003.)
New York City	New York	WEPN-FM	2012	2022	(Note: Owned by Emmis Communications.)
Pittsburgh	Pennsylvania	WEAE	1999	2011	
Dallas–Fort Worth	Texas	KESN	2000	2022	
