= Radio Disney Group =

American broadcasting company

Radio Disney Group, LLC
- Type: Limited liability company
- Industry: Radio broadcasting
- Founded: July 30, 2003; 23 years ago
- Founder: ABC Radio Networks
- Defunct: December 18, 2015; 10 years ago
- Headquarters: New York City, New York, U.S.
- Area served: Nationwide
- Owner: The Walt Disney Company
- Parent: ABC, Inc.
- Website: none

Radio Disney Group, LLC was a limited liability company that owned most of the Radio Disney radio stations operating in each U.S. state. Radio Disney Group was owned by the Disney–ABC Television Group and the headquarters were located in New York City, New York.

== History ==
The company was founded on July 30, 2003 by the ABC Radio Networks, a former subsidiary of The Walt Disney Company.

In the sale of the ABC Radio Networks to Citadel Broadcasting (in 2007), the Radio Disney Network and their owned-and-operated radio stations are not included.

In 2010, Radio Disney Group was started to sell their stations located outside of the 25 largest radio markets. The majority of the stations have gone silent, while others changed their format or maintained their regular format. On August 13, 2014, it was announced that Radio Disney will be selling off all of their stations (the majority owned by Radio Disney Group) except KDIS (owned on or before September 26, 2014) to focus on the digital XM radio and livestream radio (such as on TuneIn). While the stations were originally slated to sign off on September 26, the stations remained on the air and continued to carry Radio Disney programming until they were sold. The sale of the last station (WSDZ, to Salem Media Group) was completed on December 18, 2015.

== Former owned and operated stations ==
Callsign	Frequency	City of license	Broadcast area	Comments
WQUA^{1}	102.1	Citronelle, Alabama	Mobile metropolitan area	Sold in 2005; non-commercial station owned by the Family Worship Center Church, Inc.
KMIK^{1}	1580	Phoenix, Arizona	Greater Phoenix	Sold in 2015; station owned by Gabriella Broadcasting Licensee.
KDIS-FM^{1}	99.5	Little Rock, Arkansas	Little Rock, Arkansas	Sold in 2013; station owned by the Salem Media Group.
KIID^{1}	1470	Sacramento, California	Sacramento metropolitan area	In 2007, the station was transferred to Radio Disney Sacramento, LLC, another subsidiary of The Walt Disney Company related to Radio Disney. Was later sold in 2015 to Punjabi American Media.
KDDZ^{1}	1690	Arvada, Colorado	Denver metropolitan area	Sold in 2015 to Salem Media Group.
WDZK^{1}	1550	Bloomfield, Connecticut	Greater Hartford	Sold in 2010; station owned by Blount Communications.
WBWL^{1}	600	Jacksonville, Florida	Jacksonville metropolitan area	Sold in 2010; station owned by the Chesapeake-Portsmouth Broadcasting Corporation.
WMYM^{1}	990	Miami, Florida	Miami metropolitan area	Sold in 2014; station owned by Actualidad Radio Group.
WDYZ^{1}	990	Orlando, Florida	Greater Orlando	Sold in 2014 to the Pennsylvania Media Associates, Inc. (subsidiary of the Salem Media Group). The sale was consummated on March 27, 2015.
WWMI^{1}	1380	St. Petersburg, Florida	Tampa Bay Area	Sold in 2015 to Salem Media Group.
WGFY^{1}	1480	Charlotte, North Carolina	Charlotte Metropolitan Area	Sold in 2015. Owned by Charlotte Advent Media Corporation.
WMKI^{1}	1260	Boston, Massachusetts	Greater Boston Area	Sold in 2015; station owned by Salem Media Group. The sale was consummated on September 3, 2015.
WMNE^{1}	1600	Riviera Beach, Florida	Miami metropolitan area	Sold in 2010; station owned by Travis Media.
WSDZ^{1}	1260	Belleville, Illinois	Greater St. Louis	Sold to Salem Media Group in 2015.
WRDZ-FM^{1}	98.3	Plainfield, Indiana	Indianapolis metropolitan area	Sold in 2015; station owned by iHeartMedia.
KQAM^{1}	1480	Wichita, Kansas	Wichita metropolitan area	Sold in 2009; station owned by Steckline Communications.
WDRD^{1} ^{2}	680	Newburg, Kentucky	Louisville metropolitan area	Sold in 2010; station owned by UB Louisville, LLC.
WBYU^{1}	1450	New Orleans, Louisiana	New Orleans metropolitan area	Station was shut down on October 3, 2012.
KPHN^{1}	1190	Kansas City, Missouri	Kansas City metropolitan area	Sold in 2014, station owned by the Catholic Radio Network.
KALY^{1}	1240	Los Ranchos de Albuquerque, NM	Albuquerque metropolitan area	Sold in 2010; station currently owned by KD Radio, Inc.
WDDY^{1}	1460	Albany, New York	Capital District	Sold in 2013; station owned by Pax et Bonum, Inc.
WFDF^{1}	910	Farmington Hills, Michigan	Metro Detroit, Flint and The Thumb	Sold in 2014; station owned by The Word Network.
WWMK^{1}	1260	Cleveland, Ohio	Greater Cleveland	Sold in 2014; station is owned by St. Peters The Rock.
WFRO^{2}	900	Fremont, Ohio	Sandusky County, Ohio	Station was shut down on June 23, 2004.
KDZR^{1}	1640	Lake Oswego, Oregon	Portland metropolitan area	Sold in 2015 to Salem Media Group.
WWJZ^{1}	640	Mount Holly, New Jersey	Philadelphia metropolitan area	Sold to Starboard Media Foundation.
KMUS^{1}	1380	Sperry, Oklahoma	Tulsa metropolitan area	Sold in 2011; spanish-language station owned by Radio Las Americas, LLC.
KKSL^{3}	1290	Lake Oswego, Oregon	Portland metropolitan area	The license was cancelled on February 23, 2006. Under the Disney ownership, the station was operated by Crawford Broadcasting under Local marketing agreement.
WDDZ^{1}	550	Pawtucket, Rhode Island	Providence metropolitan area	Sold in 2010; station currently owned by Starboard Broadcasting.
WWCS^{1}	540	Canonsburg, Pennsylvania	Pittsburgh metropolitan area	Station owned by Birach Broadcasting Corporation but operated by Radio Disney Group under Time brokerage agreement; the agreement expired on December 31, 2010 and Disney flipped the Radio Disney affiliation to WEAE.
KMKI^{1}	620	Plano, Texas	Dallas-Fort Worth Metroplex	Sold in 2015; station owned by the Salem Media Group, now broadcasting a Business News/Talk format.
KMIC^{1}	1590	Houston, Texas	Greater Houston	Sold in 2014; station owned by DAIJ Media, LLC
KRDY^{1}	1160	San Antonio, Texas	Greater San Antonio	Sold in 2013; station owned by the Salem Media Group.
KWDZ^{1}	910	Salt Lake City, Utah	Salt Lake City metropolitan area	Sold in 2015; station owned by iHeartMedia.
WHKT^{1}	1650	Portsmouth, Virginia	Hampton Roads	Sold in 2010; station owned by the Chesapeake-Portsmouth Broadcasting Corporation.
WRJR^{3}	1010	Portsmouth, Virginia	Hampton Roads	Sold in 2010; station owned by the Chesapeake-Portsmouth Broadcasting Corporation. Under the Disney ownership, Chesapeake-Portsmouth Broadcasting operated the station under Local marketing agreement.
WDZY^{1}	1290	Colonial Heights, Virginia	Greater Richmond Region	Sold in 2013; station owned by the Richmond Christian Radio Corporation.
WKSH^{1}	1640	Sussex, Wisconsin	Milwaukee metropolitan area	Sold in 2014; station owned by Starboard Broadcasting.

Notes:

- ^{1} Former Radio Disney owned-and-operated station.
- ^{2} Former ESPN Radio owned-and-operated station.
- ^{3} Former Disney independent radio station.

== See also ==
- Radio Disney
- Cumulus Media Networks (formerly ABC Radio Networks and Citadel Media)
- Disney–ABC Television Group
