= WDVM =

WDVM may refer to:

- WDVM (AM), a radio station (1050 AM) licensed to Eau Claire, Wisconsin, United States
- WDVM-TV, a television station (channel 23, virtual 25) licensed to Hagerstown, Maryland, United States
- WMMA-FM, a radio station (93.9 FM) licensed to Nekoosa, Wisconsin, United States, which held the call sign WDVM-FM from 2001 to 2002
- WUSA (TV), a television station (channel 9) licensed to Washington, D.C., United States, which held the call sign WDVM-TV from 1978 to 1986
