= KEXB (AM) =

Radio station in University Park, Texas

Coordinates: 32°45′2.5″N 96°43′23″W

- University Park, Texas; United States
- Broadcast area: Dallas/Fort Worth Metroplex
- Frequency: 1440 kHz
- Branding: Relevant Radio

Programming
- Format: Catholic talk and teaching
- Affiliations: Relevant Radio

Ownership
- Owner: Relevant Radio, Inc.
- Sister stations: KTEK (Houston area); KIXL (Austin area); KRDY (San Antonio area)

History
- First air date: 1938 (as KDNT Denton)
- Former call signs: KDNT (1938–1994); KICI (1994–1996); KINF (1996–1997); KTNO (1997–2019)
- Call sign meaning: K EXperts in Business (former call sign and format of AM 620)

Technical information
- Licensing authority: FCC
- Facility ID: 34562
- Class: B
- Power: 50,000 watts day 350 watts night

Links
- Public license information: Public file; LMS
- Webcast: Listen Live
- Website: relevantradio.com

KEXB (1440 AM) is a radio station, licensed to University Park, Texas, and serving the Dallas/Fort Worth Metroplex. It is owned and operated by Relevant Radio, Inc., and carries a Catholic talk and teaching radio format. Most of the programming comes from the Wisconsin-based radio network known as "Relevant Radio."

By day, KEXB transmits 50,000 watts, the maximum for AM radio stations licensed by the Federal Communications Commission, but at night, to protect other stations on 1440 AM, it reduces power to 350 watts. It uses a directional antenna at all times, employing a four to five-tower array. The transmitter is off Bruton Road in Dallas.

== History ==
The station signed on from Denton in 1938 as KDNT, and would later become a Top 40 station throughout portions of the 1960s and 1970s before becoming a MOR station. It mainly served the Denton area until Marcos A. Rodriguez purchased it in 1991 and converted it to a Spanish-language Regional Mexican radio station. The transmitter was moved into the Dallas/Fort Worth Metroplex and the city of license was switched to University Park, Texas.

"Radio Luz" ident used until 2019.

It was announced on October 21, 2011, that Mortenson Broadcasting would be selling three of its AM stations (including then KTNO) and its FM translator K273BJ to Salem Communications for a reported $2.2 million in cash.

In August 2019, Salem announced that the company had secured a deal with Immaculate Heart Media, Inc. to sell nine stations (including 1440) and four translators. Prior to the closing of the sale, Salem moved the "Radio Luz" format to 620 AM on October 21, 2019. The call sign for this facility was swapped from KTNO to KEXB, and vice versa for the 620 facility. During the transition, 1440 ran a continuous redirect message, advising listeners of the Spanish language Christian programming to move their radio dials to 620 AM. The sale was consummated on November 14, 2019.

Once the Spanish Religious format relocated to AM 620, 1440 KEXB became an owned-and-operated network affiliate of Relevant Radio.
