= KBOQ =

KBOQ may refer to:

- KBOQ (FM), a radio station (100.9 FM) licensed to serve Lima, Montana, United States
- KKAR, a radio station (1260 AM) licensed to Beverly Hills, California, United States, known as KBOQ from 2016 to 2017
- KDFG, a radio station (103.9 FM) licensed to Seaside, California, United States, known as KBOQ from 2008 to 2016
- KKHK, a radio station (95.5 FM) licensed to Carmel, California, United States, known as KBOQ-FM and KBOQ from 1994 to 2008
- KYAA, a radio station (1200 AM) licensed to Soquel, California, United States, known as KBOQ from 1993 to 1994
- KTOM-FM, a radio station (92.7 FM) licensed to Marina, California, United States, known as KBOQ and KBOQ-FM from 1982 to 1994
