= WDCR =

WDCR may refer to:

- WDCR (FM), a radio station (88.9 FM) licensed to Oreana, Illinois, United States
- WDCR (New Hampshire), a defunct radio station (1340 AM) licensed to Hanover, New Hampshire, United States, that operated from 1958 to 2008
