= KNIH =

Coordinates: 36°0′39.9″N 115°14′30.99″W

- Paradise, Nevada; United States
- Broadcast area: Las Vegas metropolitan area
- Frequency: 970 kHz
- Branding: Relevant Radio

Programming
- Format: Catholic radio
- Network: Relevant Radio

Ownership
- Owner: Relevant Radio, Inc.

History
- First air date: February 21, 1962
- Former call signs: KVEG (1961–1977); KNUU (1977–2012)
- Call sign meaning: "Nevada Immaculate Heart"

Technical information
- Licensing authority: FCC
- Facility ID: 33074
- Class: B
- Power: 5,000 watts day; 500 watts night

Links
- Public license information: Public file; LMS
- Webcast: Listen live
- Website: relevantradio.com

KNIH (970 AM) is a radio station licensed to Paradise, Nevada and serves the Las Vegas Valley. The station is owned and operated by Relevant Radio, Inc. and broadcasts a Catholic radio format, including call-in shows, discussions and broadcasts of the Catholic mass. The call letters KNIH stand for "Nevada Immaculate Heart".

The station broadcasts at 5000 watts by day. To avoid interfering with other stations on AM 970, it reduces power at night to 500 watts. The transmitter is located off South Rainbow Boulevard near West Landberg Avenue in Las Vegas.

== History ==
The station first signed on the air on February 21, 1962, as KVEG, originally operating only during the dayime with just 500 watts of power. It was affiliated with the CBS Radio Network and was later authorized to broadcast around the clock, increasing its daytime power to 5,000 watts. In 1977, the call sign was changed to KNUU. For a period, it broadcast an all-news radio format before switching to a business talk format. During its business talk era, KNUU carried the syndicated program Imus in the Morning and featured local news, traffic, and weather.

In 2002, KNUU's five-tower AM directional array was located just west of Rainbow Boulevard near Sunset. The site was noted as a prime example of urban encroachment, as it had become surrounded by new housing developments and was in the path of the future Clark County 215 freeway expansion. This suburban sprawl put the fate of the tower site in question, with Federal Communications Commission records at the time suggesting that KNUU was likely preparing for a potential relocation of its towers further south. The station's transmitter site was moved to its current location in Enterprise, southwest of downtown Las Vegas, in 2012.

KNIH was previously owned by the Blue Star Media Group Inc. The company owns the Business Talk Radio Network and the Lifestyle Talk Radio Network. On November 30, 2012, AM 970 was sold for $950,000 to Immaculate Heart Radio (IHR Educational Broadcasting). The call sign was officially changed to KNIH on December 14, 2012, and the station adopted its current Catholic religious format.
