= KJPG =

Relevant Radio station in Frazier Park–Bakersfield, California

- Frazier Park, California; United States
- Broadcast area: Bakersfield metropolitan area
- Frequency: 1050 kHz
- Branding: Relevant Radio

Programming
- Format: Catholic
- Affiliations: Relevant Radio

Ownership
- Owner: Relevant Radio; (Relevant Radio, Inc.)
- Sister stations: KIHM

History
- First air date: 1994
- Former call signs: KKGO (1994–1996); KTRJ (1996–1999); KMAP (1999–2005)

Technical information
- Licensing authority: FCC
- Facility ID: 2268
- Class: D
- Power: 10,000 watts days only
- Transmitter coordinates: 35°01′27.9″N 118°55′8.4″W
- Translator: (see below)

Links
- Public license information: Public file; LMS
- Webcast: Listen Live
- Website: https://relevantradio.com/

KJPG (1050 AM) is a radio station broadcasting a Catholic radio format as a network affiliate of Relevant Radio. Licensed to Frazier Park, California, it serves the Bakersfield metropolitan area. The station is owned by Relevant Radio, Inc., which is based in Green Bay, Wisconsin.

By day, KJPG is powered at 10,000 watts using a directional antenna with a three-tower array. But because 1050 AM is a Mexican clear-channel frequency reserved for XEG in Monterrey, KJPG must sign off at night to avoid interference. The transmitter is off South Wheeler Ridge Road at Legray Road in Wheeler Ridge, California. Programming is heard around the clock on 80-watt FM translator K294DK at 106.7 MHz in Bakersfield.

== History ==
The station began broadcasting in 1994, holding the call sign KKGO. It aired a classical music format as part of a simulcast with KKGO-FM in Los Angeles. In June 1996, the station ended its simulcast with KKGO-FM, but continued to air a classical music format independently. On August 30, 1996, the station's call sign was changed to KTRJ.

In November 1999, the station's call sign was changed to KMAP, and it began airing Christmas music. The station briefly returned to airing classical music in January 2000 before becoming a Radio Disney affiliate in March.

In 2003, the station was sold to IHR Educational Broadcasting for $700,000, and it adopted a Catholic talk format as an affiliate of Immaculate Heart Radio. On April 11, 2005, the station's call sign was changed to KJPG.

In 2017, Immaculate Heart Radio merged with Relevant Radio and KJPG became a Relevant Radio network affiliate.

== Translator ==
KJPG is also heard at 106.7 MHz, through a translator in Bakersfield, California.

| Call sign | Frequency | City of license | FID | ERP (W) | HAAT | Class | FCC info |
|---|---|---|---|---|---|---|---|
| K294DK | 106.7 FM | Bakersfield, California | 142301 | 80 | 36 m (118 ft) | D | LMS |
