= WWTP =

WWTP may also refer to:

- Wastewater treatment plant, a plant to treat wastewater to get clean water
- WWTP (FM), a radio station in Augusta, Maine
