= KEXB =

KEXB may refer to:

- KEXB (AM), a radio station (1440 AM) licensed to University Park, Texas, United States
- KTNO (Plano, Texas), a radio station (620 AM) licensed to Plano, Texas, United States, which held the call sign KEXB from 2015 to 2019
