= KDIS =

KDIS may refer to:

- KDIS-FM, a radio station at 99.5 FM located in Little Rock, Arkansas
- KWVE (AM), a radio station at 1110 AM located in Pasadena, California, which held the call sign KDIS from 2003 to 2017
- KSPN (AM), a radio station at 710 AM located in Los Angeles, California, which held the call sign KDIS from 1997 to 2003
