= KMMK =

KMMK may refer to:

- the ICAO code for Meriden Markham Municipal Airport, in Meriden, Connecticut, United States
- KMMK (FM), a radio station (88.7 FM) licensed to serve Coggon, Iowa, United States
- KMMK-LP, a low-power television station (channel 14) licensed to serve Sacramento, California, United States
- KHYI, a Texas radio station known as KMMK from 1975 to 1985
