= WRGW =

WRGW may refer to:

- WRGW-LP, a low power radio station (94.5 FM) licensed to Shawano, Wisconsin, United States
- WRGW (student radio), radio station at George Washington University in Washington, D.C., United States
