= WMNE =

WMNE may refer to:

- WMNE-LP (channel 32), a defunct Portland, Maine low-power TV station
- WMNE (FM), a defunct FM radio station which held the call sign WMNE from 1946 until its deletion in 1948
- WMEQ (AM) (880 AM), a Menomonie, Wisconsin AM radio station which held the call sign WMNE from 1951 to 1989
- WPOM (1600 AM), a Riviera Beach, Florida AM radio station which held the call sign WMNE from 1999 to 2010
