= KLFF =

KLFF may refer to:

- KLFF (FM), a radio station (89.3 FM) licensed to serve San Luis Obispo, California, United States
- KIHC (AM), a radio station (890 AM) licensed to serve Arroyo Grande, California, which held the call sign KLFF from 2001 to 2013
- KPXQ, a radio station (1360 AM) licensed to serve Glendale, Arizona, United States, which held the call sign KLFF from 1981 to 1992
- KLFF (Washington), a defunct radio station (1590 AM) licensed to Mead, Washington during its entire lifespan from 1962 to 1966.
