= KWG (AM) =

Relevant Radio station in Stockton, California, United States

- Stockton, California; United States
- Frequency: 1230 kHz
- Branding: Relevant Radio

Programming
- Format: Religious
- Network: Relevant Radio

Ownership
- Owner: Relevant Radio, Inc.

History
- First air date: 1921
- Call sign meaning: None (randomly assigned)

Technical information
- Licensing authority: FCC
- Facility ID: 60418
- Class: C
- Power: 900 watts
- Transmitter coordinates: 37°57′33.7″N 121°15′31.8″W
- Translator: 92.7 K224FB (Stockton)

Links
- Public license information: Public file; LMS
- Webcast: Listen live
- Website: relevantradio.com

KWG (1230 AM) is a radio station licensed to Relevant Radio, Inc. in Stockton, California. It carries that company's Catholic talk radio programming.

== History ==
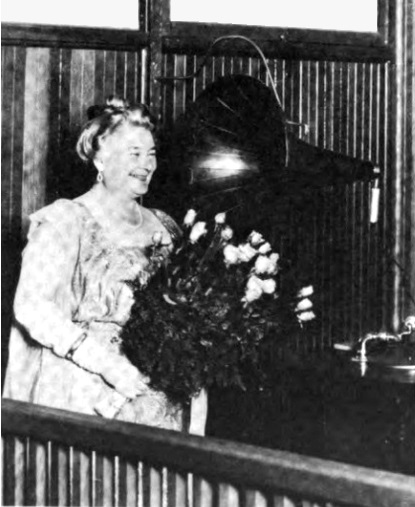
On November 22, 1921, Ernestine Schumann-Heink made her debut radio broadcast over amateur station 6FI, operated by the Portable Wireless Company and located at the Stockton Record newspaper offices. Two weeks later, 6FI was relicensed as KWG.

KWG is one of the oldest broadcasting stations in the United States, and the first radio station in the Stockton-Sacramento area. It was initially licensed to the Portable Wireless Telephone Company on December 7, 1921, as the second formally licensed broadcasting station west of the Mississippi River. In addition, it traces its history to an earlier amateur station operated by Paul Oard.

Oard was the principal engineer for Oard Radio Laboratories, a small radio equipment company owned by George Turner and located at 1218 North Union Street in Stockton. The company's apparatus was sold through the Atlantic-Pacific Radio Supplies Company of San Francisco.

In the spring of 1921, Oard installed a receiver in an automobile, and as part of the demonstrations picked up music transmitted by his amateur station, 6FI. Shortly thereafter, arrangements were made with the Stockton Record newspaper to make regular broadcasts over 6FI. A debut program was presented at 8:00 p.m. on November 22, 1921, which featured contralto Ernestine Schumann-Heink singing "At Parting" and "The Rosary". During this broadcast it was also announced that Oard Radio Laboratories had been renamed the Portable Wireless Telephone Company.

In late 1921, radio stations in the United States were regulated by the Department of Commerce. Initially, there were no formal regulations specifying which stations could make broadcasts intended for the general public, and 6FI was one of a number of amateur and experimental stations in California making regular broadcasts. However, in order to provide common standards for the service, the Commerce Department issued a regulation effective December 1, 1921, that stated that broadcasting stations would now have to hold a Limited Commercial license that authorized operation on two designated broadcasting wavelengths: 360 meters (833 kHz) for "entertainment", and 485 meters (619 kHz) for "market and weather reports".

On December 7, 1921, a broadcasting station license with the randomly assigned call letters KWG was issued to Portable Wireless Telephone Company, for operation on 360 meters. This authorization marked the second formally recognized broadcasting station in the West; at the time the December 1, 1921, regulations were adopted, a small number of stations already held licenses that met the new standards, including KQL, licensed to Arno A. Kluge in Los Angeles.

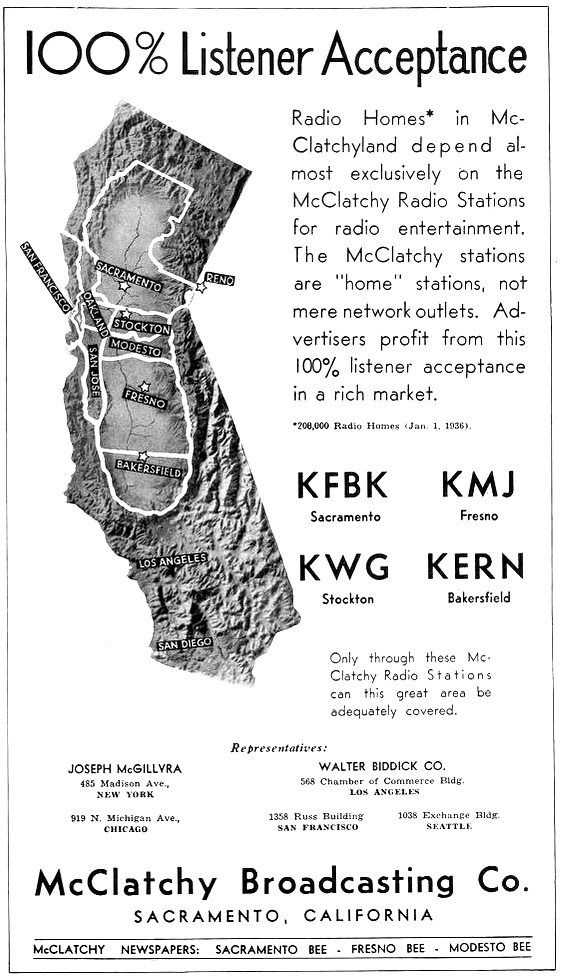
In 1936, KWG was one of four central California radio stations owned by the McClatchy Broadcasting Company.

KWG adopted the slogan "Voice of the San Joaquin Valley". The station's studios were originally located on the third floor of the Record building, with an antenna constructed on the roof. In 1924 the Record ended its affiliation with KWG, and the station moved to the Hotel Stockton. In 1927 it moved to the basement of the Medico-Dental Building, where it stayed until 1936. On November 11, 1928, under the provisions of a sweeping reallocation resulting from the Federal Radio Commission's implementation of General Order 40, KWG was assigned to a "local" transmitting frequency, 1200 kHz.

George Turner sold KWG in the spring of 1930 to the McClatchy system of radio stations and newspapers. The station installed a T-type transmitting antenna at the corner of Weber Avenue and E Street in Stockton, which went into service in 1931. The antenna was strung between two 60-meter-tall (200 ft) wooden poles placed at either end of the transmission building, and connected to the transmitter by a line that ran through a hole in the building's roof. KWG was one of the last broadcast stations to employ this type of antenna; it remained in use until the 1990s, when it was replaced by a single guyed-wire tower located next to the transmitter building.

In December 1936, the station moved into new studios located atop the Wolf Hotel in San Joaquin City, which were described as "the last word in acoustical engineering and design". On March 29, 1941, under the provisions of the North American Regional Broadcasting Agreement, KWG, along with most of the other stations transmitting on 1200 kHz, was reassigned to 1230 kHz, where the station has been ever since.

In 1956, the station moved to 411 East Market Street. Barnes Enterprises, led by Johnny Jacobs, the off-screen announcer for various Chuck Barris Productions game shows, owned KWG between 1978 and early 1981. In February 1981, Best Radio Incorporated of San Bernardino purchased KWG, along with then-KSRT 100.9 MHz (now KMIX), licensed to Tracy, California. KWG then began its "Delta Country" format. Just under 18 months later KWG became an "oldies" station, and was very successful well into the 1990s.

IHR Educational Broadcasting purchased KWG from The (Susan) Carson Group Inc. on October 18, 1999, reportedly for $300,000, and began carrying the inspirational "Catholic Talk Radio" programming. A 2013 review noted the station had eliminated local programming and "no longer has a business office or studio in Stockton". KWG switched to Relevant Radio programming on June 30, 2017, when IHR Educational Broadcasting consummated a merger with Starboard Media Foundation.

== See also ==
- List of initial AM-band station grants in the United States
- List of three-letter broadcast call signs in the United States
