= WHFA =

- Poynette, Wisconsin; United States
- Broadcast area: Madison
- Frequency: 1240 kHz
- Branding: Relevant Radio

Programming
- Format: Catholic radio

Ownership
- Owner: Relevant Radio; (Relevant Radio, Inc.)

History
- First air date: 1925
- Former call signs: WIBU (1925–2001)

Technical information
- Licensing authority: FCC
- Facility ID: 54617
- Class: C
- Power: 1,000 watts unlimited
- Transmitter coordinates: 43°21′38″N 89°24′8″W
- Repeater: 97.3 W247CI (Middleton)

Links
- Public license information: Public file; LMS
- Webcast: Listen Live
- Website: relevantradio.com

WHFA (1240 AM) is a radio station licensed to Poynette, Wisconsin, United States. The station serves the Madison area. It broadcasts a Catholic format. The station is owned by Relevant Radio, Inc., and is an affiliate of Relevant Radio.

== History ==
The station was first licensed on July 8, 1925, as WIBU, to William C. Forrest's The Electric Farm in Poynette. Forrest was an early pioneer of Wisconsin broadcasting. The call letters were randomly assigned from a roster of available call signs, and were adopted to mean "Wind Is Being Used" or "Wind Is Behind Us", as Forrest utilized windmills to generate the farm's electricity.

Following the establishment of the Federal Radio Commission (FRC), stations were initially issued a series of temporary authorizations starting on May 3, 1927. In addition, they were informed that if they wanted to continue operating, they needed to file a formal license application by January 15, 1928, as the first step in determining whether they met the new "public interest, convenience, or necessity" standard. On May 25, 1928, the FRC issued General Order 32, which notified 164 stations, including WIBU, that "From an examination of your application for future license it does not find that public interest, convenience, or necessity would be served by granting it." However, the station successfully convinced the commission that it should remain licensed.

On November 11, 1928, the FRC made a major reallocation of station transmitting frequencies, as part of a reorganization resulting from its implementation of General Order 40. WIBU was assigned to 1310 kHz, which was changed to 1210 kHz in 1931. On March 29, 1941, the station moved to 1240 kHz, its location ever since, as part of the implementation of the North American Regional Broadcasting Agreement.

Studios were housed in a streamlined art-modern style building located on N2349 WIBU Road in Poynette.Veteran Wisconsin Public Radio announcer Jim Packard, announcer of Whad’Ya Know?, was among WIBU alums.

In the spring of 1988, WIBU gained national notoriety in national media as it adopted an all polka format, which lasted until 1991. In 1999 the format changed to Music of Your Life.

WIBU was sold to Starboard Broadcasting in 2001 and became WHFA, carrying Starboard's Catholic religious format, branded Relevant Radio.

Former logo
