= KHOT (AM) =

- Madera, California; United States
- Broadcast area: Madera-Fresno
- Frequency: 1250 kHz
- Branding: Relevant Radio

Programming
- Format: Catholic radio
- Network: Relevant Radio

Ownership
- Owner: Relevant Radio, Inc.

History
- First air date: 1957

Technical information
- Licensing authority: FCC
- Facility ID: 39566
- Class: D
- Power: 500 watts (day); 81 watts (night)
- Transmitter coordinates: 36°57′57.8″N 120°02′9.6″W
- Translator: 100.7 K264CK (Fresno)

Links
- Public license information: Public file; LMS
- Webcast: Listen live
- Website: relevantradio.com

KHOT (1250 AM) is a radio station broadcasting a Catholic format. Licensed to Madera, California, United States, it serves the Madera-Fresno area. The station is owned by Relevant Radio, Inc.
