= WZNZ =

- Atlantic Beach, Florida; United States
- Broadcast area: Jacksonville metropolitan area
- Frequency: 1600 kHz
- Branding: Relevant Radio

Programming
- Format: Catholic talk radio
- Affiliations: Relevant Radio

Ownership
- Owner: Relevant Radio, Inc.
- Sister stations: WQOP

History
- First air date: 1958; 68 years ago
- Former call signs: WJNJ (1958–1984); WQBR (1984–1993); WNCM (1993–1997); WQOP (1997–2010)

Technical information
- Licensing authority: FCC
- Facility ID: 48393
- Class: D
- Power: 5,000 watts day 89 watts night
- Transmitter coordinates: 30°19′29.00″N 81°25′48.00″W
- Translator: 93.7 W229CZ (Jacksonville)

Links
- Public license information: Public file; LMS
- Webcast: Listen live
- Website: relevantradio.com

WZNZ (1600 AM) – branded Relevant Radio – is a non-commercial Catholic radio station licensed to Atlantic Beach, Florida. Owned by Relevant Radio, Inc., the station serves the Jacksonville metropolitan area but does not broadcast any local programming, instead functioning as a repeater for Relevant Radio's English language radio network. The WZNZ transmitter is located in Atlantic Beach.

On January 3, 2017, WZNZ changed their format from oldies (as "The Beach", format moved to WSOL-FMHD2) to business news, branded as "100.3 The Biz" (simulcast on FM translator W262AG 100.3 FM Jacksonville).

On April 6, 2018, "100.3 The Biz" rebranded as "Talk 100.3" with the addition of conservative talkers Hugh Hewitt and Laura Ingraham.

The station was sold to Immaculate Heart Media, Inc. in September 2019, and it became an affiliate of Relevant Radio. On May 17, 2021, WZNZ switched to the English-language version of Relevant Radio.
