= KIHH =

Relevant Radio station in Eureka, California

Coordinates: 40°48′9.5″N 124°08′20.2″W

- Eureka, California; United States
- Broadcast area: Humboldt Bay
- Frequency: 1400 kHz
- Branding: Relevant Radio

Programming
- Format: Catholic
- Affiliations: Relevant Radio

Ownership
- Owner: Relevant Radio, Inc.

History
- First air date: July 26, 2008
- Call sign meaning: Immaculate Heart Humboldt (after Immaculate Heart Radio, predecessor to Relevant)

Technical information
- Licensing authority: FCC
- Facility ID: 160910
- Class: C
- Power: 790 watts

Links
- Public license information: Public file; LMS
- Webcast: Listen Live
- Website: KIHH website

KIHH (1400 AM) is a radio station broadcasting a Catholic format. Licensed to Eureka, California, the station serves the Humboldt Bay area. The station is owned by Relevant Radio, Inc.

== History ==
This station was set to launch in 2003, but had to face several setbacks such as financial troubles and transmitter location issues. KIHH is the only Catholic-programmed station in Humboldt Bay.
