= KYAA =

- Soquel, California; United States
- Broadcast area: Monterey Bay-San Jose-Santa Cruz
- Frequency: 1200 kHz
- Branding: Relevant Radio

Programming
- Format: Catholic radio
- Network: Relevant Radio

Ownership
- Owner: Relevant Radio, Inc.

History
- First air date: 2001

Technical information
- Licensing authority: FCC
- Facility ID: 60852
- Class: B
- Power: 25,000 watts (day); 10,000 watts (night)
- Transmitter coordinates: 36°39′37.9″N 121°32′32.8″W

Links
- Public license information: Public file; LMS
- Webcast: Listen live
- Website: relevantradio.com

KYAA (1200 AM) is a radio station broadcasting a Catholic radio format. It is licensed to Soquel, California, United States, and serves the Monterey Bay, Santa Cruz and San Jose areas. The station is owned by Relevant Radio, Inc.

== History ==
Between 2001 and early 2013, the station played a wide variety of oldies music from the 1950s, 1960s, and 1970s, and was the only oldies station in that time period in the Monterey Bay Area.

Former Los Angeles KHJ boss jock Don Murray (Carlson) began the station along with radio veteran Denis 'Catfish' Miller . The station branded as KYA, minus the additional 'A', as a tribute to the noted Top 40 station in San Francisco in the 1960s and 1970s with the same call letters (now KSFB). Murray and Miller used the old KYA jingle package, and the station sounded similar to the way it had before. Local radio veteran David Mars also worked on the station for a time. The station was simulcast on FM and AM and reached its peak of success in 2004.

It was sold back to Salinas' Wolfhouse broadcasting after a failed LMA by People's Radio, and the format was dropped in favor of a more urban contemporary and hip hop music format, ending KYA and its Top 40 roots. Later, AM 1200 adopted the "Music of Your Life" syndicated format.

People's Radio, Inc. tried to sell the station for quite some time without success. It donated KYAA to IHR Educational Broadcasting, which aired its Immaculate Heart Radio Roman Catholic religion format. The license to cover to IHR was granted by the U.S. Federal Communications Commission on July 29, 2013. KYAA flipped to the Relevant Radio branding when IHR Educational Broadcasting and Starboard Media Foundation completed their merger on July 3, 2017.
