= KCEO =

Relevant Radio station in Vista, California, United States

- Vista, California; United States
- Broadcast area: Western San Diego County
- Frequency: 1000 kHz

Programming
- Format: Catholic radio
- Network: Relevant Radio

Ownership
- Owner: Relevant Radio, Inc.

History
- First air date: March 13, 1968
- Former call signs: KMLO (1968–1986); KKOS (1986); KVSD (1986–1990)
- Call sign meaning: Chief Executive Officer, from former business format

Technical information
- Licensing authority: FCC
- Facility ID: 67666
- Class: B
- Power: 10,000 watts (day); 900 watts (night)
- Transmitter coordinates: 33°13′58.1″N 117°16′14.1″W
- Translator: 99.3 K257FV (San Diego)

Links
- Public license information: Public file; LMS
- Webcast: Listen live
- Website: relevantradio.com

KCEO (1000 AM) is a non-commercial radio station licensed to Vista, California, United States, and serving San Diego County. It carries a Catholic radio format, owned and operated by the Relevant Radio network. The studios are located in Carlsbad, California.

KCEO's transmitter is located off of Sagewood Drive in Oceanside, near Guajome County Park. The station is also relayed over low-power FM translator K257FV in San Diego at 99.3 MHz.

== History ==
=== KMLO, KKOS, KVSD ===
This station signed on the air on March 13, 1968, as KMLO. Because 1000 AM is a clear channel frequency, to avoid interference, the station was limited to 1,000 watts and was a daytimer, required to go off the air at night. It was owned by the North County Broadcasting Company.

In 1976, the FCC granted a construction permit to increase the power to 5,000 watts days and 1,000 watts nights. But it had to set up a directional antenna to keep the signal from interfering with Class A stations KNWN Seattle, WMVP Chicago and XEOY Mexico City, all broadcasting on 1000 kHz.

Tri-Cities Broadcasting, owner of KKOS-FM in Carlsbad (now KSSX), bought KMLO in 1985. It relaunched the station as KKOS AM in January 1986. The call letters changed to KVSD, "The Voice of San Diego," in April.

=== Business News and Talk ===
In August 2005, the station began broadcasting a business news format. Until August 2007, KCEO had competition with another business talk station, Cash 1700, with its studios in San Diego and its transmitter in Tecate, Baja California. On August 1, 2007, Cash 1700 became "San Diego 1700." It began airing a talk radio format, while still retaining Ray Lucia and a few other, one-hour business talk shows.

KCEO was one of the first stations to carry Rush Limbaugh after his show became nationally syndicated. KCEO was the former flagship station for business talk host Ray Lucia.

=== Catholic programming ===
Effective March 7, 2012, KCEO changed its format. It began airing Catholic talk and teaching full-time. Originally, the shows were provided by Immaculate Heart Radio.

The station switched to the Relevant Radio branding when the two organizations merged on June 30, 2017. It now carries most of the Relevant Radio line-up around the clock.
