= KPJP =

- Greenville, California; United States
- Broadcast area: Sierra Nevada
- Frequency: 89.3 MHz
- Branding: Relevant Radio

Programming
- Format: Catholic
- Network: Relevant Radio

Ownership
- Owner: Relevant Radio, Inc.

Technical information
- Licensing authority: FCC
- Facility ID: 92527
- Class: C1
- ERP: 4,500 watts (horizontal); 100,000 watts (vertical)
- HAAT: 716.0 meters (2,349.1 ft)
- Transmitter coordinates: 40°13′59″N 121°1′8″W

Links
- Public license information: Public file; LMS
- Webcast: Listen live
- Website: relevantradio.com

KPJP (89.3 FM) is a radio station licensed to Greenville, California, United States, and serving Plumas County and the surrounding Sierra Nevada area. The station is owned by Relevant Radio, Inc.
