= WBMD =

- Baltimore, Maryland; United States
- Frequency: 750 kHz
- Branding: Relevant Radio

Programming
- Language: English
- Format: Catholic talk
- Network: Relevant Radio

Ownership
- Owner: Relevant Radio, Inc.

History
- First air date: November 27, 1947
- Call sign meaning: Baltimore, Maryland

Technical information
- Licensing authority: FCC
- Facility ID: 1913
- Class: D
- Power: 800 watts (day)
- Transmitter coordinates: 39°19′26.00″N 76°32′56.00″W

Links
- Public license information: Public file; LMS
- Webcast: Listen live
- Website: relevantradio.com

WBMD (750 AM) is a radio station broadcasting a religious format. Licensed to Baltimore, Maryland, United States, the station is Baltimore's outlet for the Catholic-oriented Relevant Radio network.

Because it shares the same frequency as "clear channel" station WSB in Atlanta, WBMD broadcasts only during the daytime hours. The correct coordinates for the tower are 39° 18' 42.6"N, 76° 29' 27.2"W. The antenna is part of an array also used by WFSI on 860kHz.

== History ==
WBMD began broadcasting November 27, 1947, on 750 kHz with 1 kW power (daytime only). The station was licensed to Key Broadcasting Corporation, with studios at 2 West Eager Street in Baltimore. In the 1950s-1960s, the station aired daily religious programs by a number of local ministers, who bought airtime in 15- or 30-minute blocks. Sunday afternoons in the 1960s featured ethnic programs, such as Greek and German language shows. In the 1990s, WBMD's schedule continued its focus on religious programming.

In 1994, WBMD's ownership, Sconnix Broadcasting, sold the station, along with FM sister station WQSR (105.7), to American Radio Systems (ARS). In 2005, to comply with Federal Communications Commission (FCC) ownership restrictions, Infinity Radio sold WBMD and WBGR—among the few religious-oriented stations in the group—to Family Stations; Family already owned WFSI (107.9 FM) in nearby Annapolis.

In 2021, Family Stations swapped WBMD to Relevant Radio in exchange for WAMT in the Orlando, Florida, area. The swap, which left WFSI (860 AM) as Family's only Baltimore station, allowed Family to enter the Orlando market (where Relevant Radio also owned WHOO) and Relevant Radio to enter Baltimore.
