= KTJT-LP =

- Davenport, Iowa; United States
- Broadcast area: Quad Cities
- Frequency: 95.3 MHz
- Branding: Relevant Radio

Programming
- Affiliations: Relevant Radio

Ownership
- Owner: Davenport Educational Association

History
- First air date: June 2005
- Former frequencies: 102.7 MHz (2005–2016)

Technical information
- Licensing authority: FCC
- Facility ID: 133437
- Class: L1
- ERP: 100 watts
- HAAT: 27.19 meters (89.2 ft)
- Transmitter coordinates: 41°31′48.9″N 90°34′4.5″W

Links
- Public license information: LMS
- Webcast: Listen live
- Website: relevantradio.com

KTJT-LP (103.1 FM) is a radio station licensed to Davenport, Iowa, United States, and serving the Quad Cities area. The station is owned by the Davenport Educational Association and carries programming from Relevant Radio.
