= KXXQ =

- Milan, New Mexico; United States
- Frequency: 100.7 MHz
- Branding: Relevant Radio

Programming
- Format: Catholic radio
- Affiliations: Relevant Radio

Ownership
- Owner: Relevant Radio, Inc.

History
- Former call signs: KDYC (1989–1991); KZNM (1991–1997); KQEO (1997–1999); KQEO-FM (1999)

Technical information
- Licensing authority: FCC
- Facility ID: 17161
- Class: C0
- ERP: 100,000 watts
- HAAT: 415.0 meters (1,361.5 ft)
- Transmitter coordinates: 35°28′7″N 108°14′24″W
- Translator: (see below)

Links
- Public license information: Public file; LMS
- Webcast: Listen Live
- Website: relevantradio.com

KXXQ (100.7 FM) is a radio station broadcasting a Catholic radio format, with most programming coming from the Relevant Radio network. Licensed to Milan, New Mexico, United States, the station is owned by Relevant Radio, Inc.

== History ==
The station was assigned the call letters KDYC on December 7, 1989. On January 1, 1991, the station changed its call sign to KZNM, on June 23, 1997 to KQEO, on July 13, 1999 to KQEO-FM, and on August 30, 1999 to the current KXXQ.

== Translators ==
KXXQ's relayed throughout the state on these translators:

| Call sign | Frequency | City of license | FID | ERP (W) | Class | FCC info |
|---|---|---|---|---|---|---|
| K202EF | 88.3 FM | Tucumcari, New Mexico | 154457 | 140 | D | LMS |
| K203ES | 88.5 FM | Roswell, New Mexico | 154423 | 99 | D | LMS |
| K204DB | 88.7 FM | Portales, New Mexico | 89528 | 250 | D | LMS |
| K219DR | 91.7 FM | Clovis, New Mexico | 88624 | 98 | D | LMS |
| K237EQ | 95.3 FM | Farmington, New Mexico | 147964 | 23 | D | LMS |
| K260AR | 99.9 FM | Socorro, New Mexico | 154442 | 250 | D | LMS |
| K283AQ | 104.5 FM | Eldorado at Santa Fe, New Mexico | 138653 | 50 | D | LMS |
