= WBPL-LP =

- Wilmington, North Carolina; United States
- Frequency: 93.1 MHz
- Branding: Wilmington Catholic Radio

Programming
- Format: Catholic talk radio
- Affiliations: Relevant Radio, Catholic Answers

Ownership
- Owner: Ave Maria Radio Association
- Sister stations: WJSI-LP, WJSS-LP

History
- First air date: July 2004
- Former frequencies: 92.7 MHz (2004–2012)

Technical information
- Licensing authority: FCC
- Facility ID: 135668
- Class: L1
- ERP: 97 Watts
- HAAT: 30.1 meters (99 feet)
- Transmitter coordinates: 34°12′35″N 77°56′53″W

Links
- Public license information: LMS
- Website: www.wilmingtoncatholicradio.com

WBPL-LP (93.1 FM) is a radio station licensed to Wilmington, North Carolina, United States, and serving the Wilmington area. The station is owned and operated by Ave Maria Radio Association. It airs a Catholic talk radio format.
