= KJOP =

- Lemoore, California; United States
- Broadcast area: Visalia-Tulare
- Frequency: 1240 kHz
- Branding: Relevant Radio

Programming
- Format: Catholic radio
- Network: Relevant Radio

Ownership
- Owner: Relevant Radio, Inc.

Technical information
- Licensing authority: FCC
- Facility ID: 31589
- Class: C
- Power: 250 watts (day); 1,000 watts (night)
- Transmitter coordinates: 36°18′46.8″N 119°43′51.5″W
- Translator: 94.1 K231DC (Lemoore)

Links
- Public license information: Public file; LMS
- Webcast: Listen live
- Website: relevantradio.com

KJOP (1240 AM) is a radio station broadcasting a Catholic radio format. Licensed to Lemoore, California, United States, it serves the Visalia-Tulare area. The station is owned by Relevant Radio, Inc.
