= Sheila Liaugminas =

American secular and religious journalist

Sheila Gribben Liaugminas is an American journalist with experience in both secular and religious journalism. Her writing covers a variety of topics, with her particular interest being the Catholic Church, faith, culture, politics and the media.

Liaugminas began her career in journalism working for the Dayton Journal Herald newspaper in Ohio, and then for the Dayton CBS affiliate. In Chicago, she reported for Time magazine for more than twenty years, and contributed to a number of cover stories. As well, she contributed to the Chicago Tribune and Crain’s Chicago Business.

At Chicago’s NBC affiliate (WMAQ-TV) she served as co-host of the Chicago / Midwest Emmy Award-winning (1984) program You, and guest-hosted a morning talk show.

Liaugminas has been active in the religious media, with contributions to the publications National Catholic Register, Crisis, Adoremus Bulletin, and Voices (the publication of Women for Faith & Family). More recently, Liaugminas hosted the radio show The Right Questions and Issues and Answers on the Relevant Radio Network. She has appeared as a guest on other shows on the Relevant Radio Network, as well as on the Ave Maria Radio Network.

From 2011 to 2020, she was also the host of "A Closer Look" on Relevant Radio. This was a daily 1 hour interview type radio program that centered on current events in the areas of the culture, the news, the media and the Church as they pertain to the Catholic Faith.
