= KIHC (AM) =

Coordinates: 35°08′43.9″N 120°31′18.6″W

- Arroyo Grande, California; United States
- Broadcast area: San Luis Obispo, California; Santa Maria, California
- Frequency: 890 kHz
- Branding: Relevant Radio

Programming
- Format: Christian talk
- Affiliations: Relevant Radio

Ownership
- Owner: Relevant Radio, Inc.

History
- First air date: September 1, 2002
- Former call signs: KLFF (2001–2013)
- Call sign meaning: Immaculate Heart California

Technical information
- Licensing authority: FCC
- Facility ID: 87729
- Class: B
- Power: 5,000 watts

Links
- Public license information: Public file; LMS
- Webcast: Listen Live
- Website: Revelant Radio

KIHC (890 AM) is a non-commercial radio station that is licensed to Arroyo Grande, California and broadcasts to the San Luis Obispo and Santa Maria, California areas. The station is owned by Relevant Radio, Inc. and broadcasts the Roman Catholic talk and teaching format of its nationally syndicated Relevant Radio network.

== History ==
The station first signed on September 1, 2002, as KLFF. The commercial station, owned by Jerry J. Collins, broadcast a Christian talk and teaching format and was branded "K-Life".

After years of financial difficulties, KLFF went off the air on November 1, 2012. Collins, who had been leasing the station to the previous management, donated the station's license to IHR Educational Broadcasting. The tangible property was transferred for $1 and the station was converted to non-commercial educational status. On January 1, 2013, IHR assumed control of KLFF and changed its call letters to KIHC; the company's Roman Catholic talk and teaching format, branded Immaculate Heart Radio, began airing four days later. The donation was consummated on March 26, 2013.

KIHC rebranded as Relevant Radio when IHR Educational Broadcasting and Starboard Media Foundation consummated their merger on July 3, 2017.
