= WQOP =

Catholic radio station in Jacksonville, Florida

- Jacksonville, Florida; United States
- Broadcast area: Jacksonville metropolitan area
- Frequency: 1460 kHz
- Branding: Relevant Radio

Programming
- Format: Catholic radio
- Network: Relevant Radio

Ownership
- Owner: Relevant Radio, Inc.
- Sister stations: WZNZ

History
- First air date: January 1927
- Former call signs: WMBR (1927–1975); WPDQ (1975–1987); WFYV (1987–1992); WZZN (1992); WZNZ (1992–2010)
- Call sign meaning: Queen of Peace

Technical information
- Licensing authority: FCC
- Facility ID: 51976
- Class: B
- Power: 15,000 watts (day); 5,000 watts (night)
- Transmitter coordinates: 30°19′40″N 81°44′49″W

Links
- Public license information: Public file; LMS
- Webcast: Listen live
- Website: www.relevantradio.com

WQOP (1460 AM) is a radio station licensed to serve Jacksonville, Florida. The station is owned by Relevant Radio, Inc., and broadcasts a Catholic radio format.

== History ==
=== In Tampa ===
Frank J. Reynolds established WMBR in Tampa in 1927; it was licensed by the Department of Commerce to the Premier Electric Company in January. First broadcasting for an hour a week, By June of that year, it was broadcasting on 1190 kHz with 100 watts. Studios were on Franklin Street and in the Floridan Hotel; the transmitter was on the roof of the hotel.

The original frequency of 1190 kHz changed to 1210 kHz when the Federal Radio Commission (FRC) enacted General Order 40 on November 11, 1928. WMBR was moved again to 1370 kHz in 1929 as part of frequency changes for a series of Florida stations, including the other Tampa station, WDAE, which went full-time for the first time.

=== Move to Jacksonville ===
In September 1933, Reynolds applied to the FRC to move the station from Tampa to Jacksonville; it approved the shift in October. The move took place that December. Reynolds sold WMBR to the Florida Broadcasting Company in 1934; it moved to 1400 kHz with NARBA in 1941 and then to 1460 kHz, using 5,000 watts in 1948.

In the 1960s, WMBR aired a Top 40 format and was known as "The Jacksonville Tiger". This gave Jacksonville a third station in the format, behind the higher-rated WAPE and WPDQ. DJs heard included Dick Blanchard, Brad "The Bad" Bradford, and Mike Davenport.

WMBR and WPDQ switched frequencies (and licenses) in 1975, with WPDQ relocating from 600 kHz and WMBR relocating to the lower frequency.

In the late 1980s, WFYV was affiliated with Z Rock, a now-defunct network that aired a heavy metal music format.

From 1991 to 1997, WQOP operated with the callsign WFYV and was a news station, broadcasting CNN Headline News programming. Prior to that, it simulcast WFYV-FM ("Rock 105"). In 1996, this station was one of six stations in the Paxson Communications Jacksonville station group.

In September 1997, Paxson Jacksonville License, L.P., received a license to operate the station to serve the Jacksonville, Florida, area. The station was on the air as early as February 1998. As of January 1998, the station was owned or operated by Clear Channel Radio, which it would be until Concord Media, Inc. took it over in 1999.

In 2001, the station switched from a contemporary Christian music format to a business-talk format.

In 2003, Salem Communications purchased the station from Concord Media Group as part of a four-station deal valued at $9.25 million. It retained the existing format. It switched to a sports talk format known as "Rumble 1460". As sports talk station, WZNZ aired Jacksonville University baseball games as well as "Mike and Mike in the Mornings," "The Real Deal Show," "The Dan Patrick Show," and "The Frank Frangie Show."

In December 2006, Chesapeake-Portsmouth Broadcasting purchased the station as part of a three-station deal valued at $2.8 million. and referred to its programming as "The River of Life". The programming consisted of a mixture of local and syndicated religious oriented programming. The station remained an affiliate of the Atlanta Braves radio network, a Major League Baseball affiliation that was left over from the days when the station was a sports radio station. As of July 2008, the former website is still available (1460theriver.com).

WZNZ broadcast religious programming from April 2007 to January 2008, and prior to that, it was a sports station affiliated with ESPN Radio. It had a mix of local and national sports talk shows during this period.

As of January 2008, the station was operated by Andy Johnson. It broadcast a mix of liberal, moderate, and conservative talk shows and was affiliated with CBS Radio News. It was also affiliated with national talk show hosts Ed Schultz (Jones Radio Network), Thom Hartmann (Air America Radio), and Lou Dobbs (United Stations). It also airs various Westwood One programs, including "Morning In America" with Jim Bohannon, "The Twilight Zone Radio Dramas", and "Beatle Brunch".

In May 2008, the transfer of the license from Chesapeake-Portsmouth Broadcasting to Queen of Peace Radio, Inc. was announced in accordance with FCC regulations. The assignment of license was approved on July 14, 2008, and the deal was consummated on July 29, 2008.

Until July 30, 2008, WZNZ was a "progressive" talk show format station, carrying a mix of syndicated and local programming.

WZNZ featured live, local issues-driven talk programming in the Jacksonville radio market. It served as a community sounding board with hosts such as Andy Johnson, a local talk radio fixture who has been on the air in the market for twenty years. Other hosts were also featured in the daily weekday broadcast lineup, and the topics of discussion varied from local issues to national interests.

WZNZ was also home to unique music programs, especially during the weekends. All shows are locally produced in-house and include "Americana Saturday Night" with host Big Cosmo, "Progressive Roots" featuring politically driven folk music of the past and present hosted by Ken Connors and Ce Ce Sevrin, and "I, The Indie Music Show", hosted by John Maycumber, which was an eclectic mix of punk and electronica.

On July 30, 2008, most of the news and talk programming moved to sister station WBOB after the sale of the station to Queen of Peace Radio was consummated on July 29, 2008. WQOP was sold to Immaculate Heart Media, Inc. in September 2019. On September 23, 2019, 1460AM and 1600AM became a part of Relevant Radio Network.
