= WHKZ =

Relevant Radio station in Warren, Ohio

- Warren, Ohio; United States
- Broadcast area: Mahoning Valley
- Frequency: 1440 kHz
- Branding: Relevant Radio

Programming
- Language: English
- Format: Catholic radio
- Network: Relevant Radio

Ownership
- Owner: Relevant Radio, Inc.

History
- First air date: November 11, 1941
- Former call signs: WRRN (1941–1948); WHHH (1948–1981); WRRO (1981–1998); WRBP (1998–2001); WHKW (2001); WFHM (2001); WHKW (2001–2005)
- Call sign meaning: artifact of former WHKW simulcast

Technical information
- Licensing authority: FCC
- Facility ID: 57235
- Class: B
- Power: 5,000 watts
- Transmitter coordinates: 41°09′52″N 80°50′47″W
- Translator: 107.5 W298CX (Youngstown)

Links
- Public license information: Public file; LMS
- Website: www.relevantradio.com

WHKZ (1440 AM) is a non-commercial radio station licensed to Warren, Ohio, featuring a Catholic–based Christian format as an owned-and-operated station in the Relevant Radio network. The station serves both Sharon, Pennsylvania, and Youngstown, Ohio. WHKZ's transmitter resides on Calson-Salt Springs Road in Warren, operating at a continuous power of 5,000 watts; the directional antenna pattern uses two towers during the day, and six towers at night.

== History ==
The station originally signed on November 11, 1941, at 250 watts on 1400 kHz, as WRRN, the call letters being a contraction of "Warren". In 1946, the power was increased to 5000 watts and the frequency got changed to 1440 kHz. In 1948, it was purchased by Helen Hart Hurlburt, publisher of the Tribune-Chronicle, and the call sign was changed to WHHH, to reflect her initialsUnder her ownership, a construction permit was obtained for a television station, WHHH-TV on channel 67 in the early 1950s.

Former logo as "1440 AM The Word"

Agreement was reached for Pittsburgh's Pentecostal Temple Church to acquire WHKZ from Salem Communications for a reported sale price of $550,000 and was eventually approved by the Federal Communications Commission, but eventually fell through.

The station remained owned and operated by Salem Media Group until August 15, 2019, when WHKZ and the construction permit for its forthcoming FM translator was included in a multi-station purchase by Immaculate Heart Media, Inc. valued at $8,732,125; it became an owned and operated station of the Relevant Radio network upon the deal's closing. The sale closed on November 14, and WHKZ switched programming to the Relevant Radio network.
