= WDCR (FM) =

- Oreana, Illinois; United States
- Broadcast area: Decatur, Illinois
- Frequency: 88.9 MHz
- Branding: Decatur Catholic Radio

Programming
- Language: English
- Format: Catholic radio
- Affiliations: Relevant Radio

Ownership
- Owner: St. Mary's Hospital, Decatur

History
- First air date: May 25, 2011
- Former call signs: WXMD (2010); WDCK (2010)
- Call sign meaning: Decatur Catholic Radio

Technical information
- Licensing authority: FCC
- Facility ID: 176592
- Class: A
- ERP: 1,100 watts
- HAAT: 49.6 meters (163 ft)
- Transmitter coordinates: 39°55′50″N 88°51′41.3″W
- Translator: 96.5 W243DF (Decatur)

Links
- Public license information: Public file; LMS
- Webcast: Listen live
- Website: www.wdcrradio.com

WDCR (88.9 MHz) is an FM radio station licensed to Oreana, Illinois, and owned by St. Mary's Hospital in Decatur. It broadcasts to the Decatur area on 88.9 MHz from a tower near Oreana, Illinois. It mostly airs content from Relevant Radio. It began broadcasting on May 25, 2011.
