= KYOW =

Radio station in Del Valle, Texas

- Del Valle, Texas; United States
- Broadcast area: Austin-Round Rock
- Frequency: 970 kHz
- Branding: Relevant Radio

Programming
- Format: Catholic radio
- Network: Relevant Radio

Ownership
- Owner: Relevant Radio, Inc.

History
- First air date: August 8, 1959
- Former call signs: KASE (1959–1964); KHFI (1964–1969); KTAP (1969–1974); KIXL (1974–2026)

Technical information
- Licensing authority: FCC
- Facility ID: 35011
- Class: B
- Power: 1,000 watts
- Transmitter coordinates: 30°19′13.7″N 97°37′26″W
- Translators: 103.9 K280GN (Austin); 105.1 K286CX (Round Rock)

Links
- Public license information: Public file; LMS
- Webcast: Listen live
- Website: relevantradio.com

KYOW (970 AM) is a noncommercial radio station licensed to Del Valle, Texas, United States, serving the Austin-Round Rock area. Owned and operated by Relevant Radio since 2005, it carries the network's Catholic radio programming on a full-time basis, with transmitter sited at the eastern side of Austin. Prior to ownership by Relevant Radio, the station–then KIXL–was a locally-programmed Christian station for nearly 30 years.

KYOW is additionally relayed over two low-power translator stations: K280GN (103.9 FM) in Austin and K286CX (105.1 FM) in Round Rock.

== History ==
=== Early years ===
The Austin Radio Company obtained a construction permit for a new AM radio station to be licensed to Austin, broadcasting during the daytime only with 1,000 watts, on September 24, 1958, and KASE signed on August 8, 1959. KASE offered a "good music" and news format. The station was sold several times in its early years: to E. J. Lund by stock sales in 1960 and 1961; to Rogers Broadcasting Company in 1963, after Lund's health deteriorated, and to the Southwest Republic Corporation in 1964. Southwest Republic simultaneously acquired KHFI-FM 98.1 from its owners and held the construction permit for a new Austin television station, KHFI-TV channel 42. KASE became KHFI on November 8, 1964, but it retained its format.

In August 1969, KHFI became KTAP and debuted new "pulsating sound" imaging and a contemporary format. Southwest Republic, owned by John Kingsbery, merged alongside concrete producer Featherlite Corporation into Kingstip, Inc., in 1971.

=== KIXL and KYOW ===
In 1974, Kingstip spun KTAP off to Advance, Inc. The call letters were changed to KIXL on May 28, 1974, and the station adopted a new oldies format. This lasted two years until a 1976 change that would set the tone for the next three decades of the station's programming; on May 31, the station adopted a full-time religious format.

KIXL was owned by Advance for three years and sold to the Austin Broadcasting Corporation in 1977. Led by Dick Oppenheimer, this company then bought KHFI-FM from LIN Broadcasting in 1980, reuniting former sister stations. KIXL continued to feature Christian music and a mix of local and national talk shows. The 1980s also saw KIXL become a station able to broadcast at night as well, which brought with it a change in city of license from Austin to Del Valle. One station program also made national headlines: KIXL pulled several broadcasts of a 15-minute daily show hosted by a local group, Citizens Against Pornography, for broadcasting descriptions of gay sex acts that it deemed to be "too graphic". The first broadcast to be pulled was broadcast live, and the speaker was cut off mid-sentence by the station's general manager on November 11, 1985.

Oppenheimer sold KIXL and KHFI-FM, along with his other remaining radio properties, in 1986 to Florida broadcaster George Duncan's Encore Communications in a $38 million transaction; $20 million of that was derived from the Austin duo, which set a market sale price record. Encore, however, sold KIXL two years later to KIXL Partners, a subsidiary of Signature Broadcasting, for $1.5 million. Signature Broadcasting was owned by Oppenheimer, who had just sold the station two years prior. In 1992, the station adopted an all-talk Christian format. Some of these talk shows offered conservative political viewpoints as well, such as the program hosted by Wyatt Roberts; Roberts encouraged his listeners to boycott businesses that advertised in The Texas Triangle, a statewide gay newspaper, resulting in some of those businesses being picketed—and in demonstrations outside KIXL's studios. Roberts's program would be canceled by KIXL in 1996 as the result of a "re-evaluation" of the station, with station management noting the change did not come due to the controversy.

In 1995, Intimate Life Ministries, an organization which helped churches offer marriage counseling services, entered into a deal to buy KIXL from Oppenheimer. The $1.4 million purchase was made through a commercial company; at the end of 1997, the principals then filed to transfer the license to Intimate Life itself.

In 2005, Starboard Media, the parent company of the Relevant Radio network, purchased KIXL for $3.58 million. The station changed its call sign to KYOW on February 24, 2026.
