= WBYU =

New Orleans, Louisiana; United States
- Broadcast area: New Orleans metropolitan area
- Frequency: 1450 kHz

Programming
- Language: English

Ownership
- Owner: ABC, Inc. (Disney); (Radio Disney Group)

History
- First air date: December 5, 1951
- Last air date: September 26, 2011
- Former call signs: WTIX (1951–1958); WNPS (1958–1977); WWIW (1977–1988)
- Call sign meaning: "Bayou"

Technical information
- Facility ID: 20347
- Class: C
- Power: 1,000 watts
- Transmitter coordinates: 29°57′49″N 90°06′34″W

WBYU (1450 AM) was a radio station licensed in New Orleans, Louisiana and served the New Orleans metropolitan area. The station was owned by The Walt Disney Company and featured programming from Radio Disney (2003–2011).

== History ==
The AM 1450 frequency began on 1420 when WBNO, licensed to Coliseum Place Baptist Church, moved there from 1200 in 1938. The call letters became WNOE on June 23, 1939, shortly after James A. Noe gained control of the station. On March 29, 1941, the FCC shifted most broadcast frequencies nationwide, and WNOE moved to 1450. WNOE moved to 1060 on June 1, 1950, to become a 50 kW station. Royal Broadcasting Corporation began operating WTIX on 1450 on December 5, 1951, with a classical music format. WTIX was sold to Mid Continent Broadcasting, owned by Todd Storz, on September 10, 1953, and the format flipped to Top 40. In 1958, WTIX purchased the 690 frequency from WWEZ and subsequently donated 1450 to the Orleans Parish School Board. WNPS began broadcasting May 7, 1958, with a 600 LP library donated by Mitch Miller and Columbia Records. In the fall of 1966, it broke away from strictly classical music, shifting more to popular music and introducing news and weather reports. WNPS moved to nostalgia and easy listening in 1973, before flipping to country in July 1974. In 1977, the station was sold to Sun Broadcasting, who flipped it to a "contemporary" soft rock & jazz format branded "14-D" that lasted four months. In August 1977, the station flipped to adult standards playing big band and New Orleans jazz and changed call letters to WWIW (the Way It Was) on September 14. In 1988, easy-listening WBYU-FM abruptly flipped to country, creating a public uproar. WWIW owner David Smith immediately petitioned the FCC for the highly recognizable call letters, and 1450 began broadcasting as WBYU with no format change on November 28, 1988.

In 2001, the station was sold to Beasley Broadcast Group, who flipped the format on April 23 of that year to a brokered health talk format, simulcasting WWNN in Boca Raton, Florida.

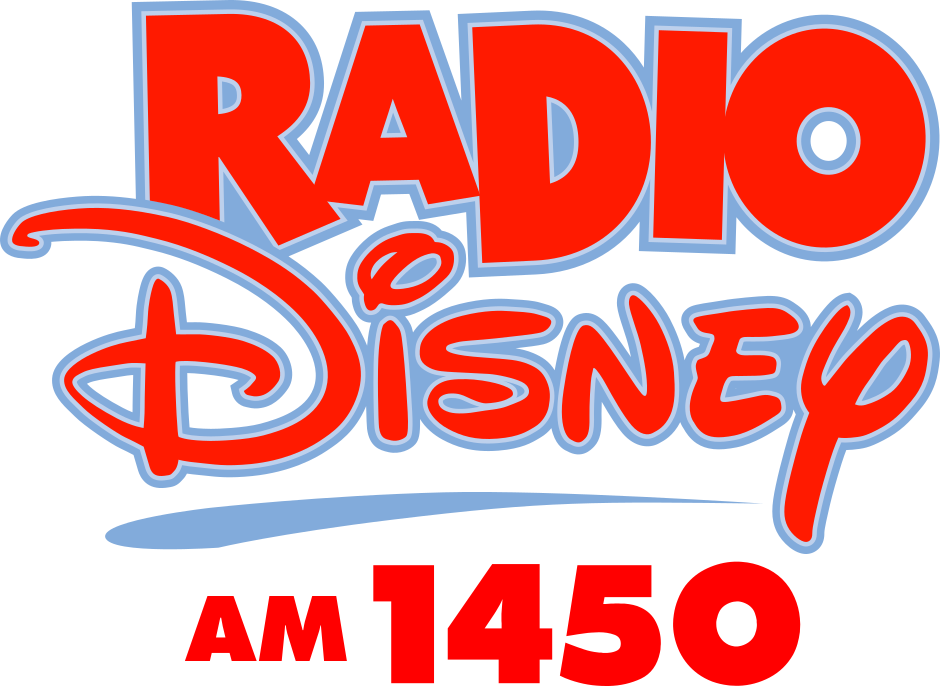
WBYU logo used from 2003 until 2007.

The non-stop infomercials continued until February 6, 2003, when new owners ABC Radio, who bought the station in 2002, flipped it to Radio Disney. On September 26, 2011, WBYU went silent as ABC bought a buyer for the station. Even though the station was on the market for almost a year, no serious offers were made to purchase station. On August 29, 2012, Hurricane Issac winds destroyed the WBYU self supporting tower. With no prospective buyers available the station declared force majeure to exit the lease for the transmitter site. The station's transmitting equipment was removed from the leased transmitter site and studio offices. Finally on September 27, 2012, ABC surrendered WBYU's license to the Federal Communications Commission (FCC). The FCC cancelled the station's license and deleted the WBYU call sign from their database on October 3, 2012.
