= FM Santa Rosa =

Radio station in Pilar, Buenos Aires, Argentina

- Argentina
- Broadcast area: Pilar, Buenos Aires
- Frequency: 90.3 mHz
- Branding: FM Santa Rosa

Programming
- Format: Catholic radio

Ownership
- Owner: Unknown

Technical information
- Class: Unknown

FM Santa Rosa is a local Catholic radio station broadcasting from the city of Pilar, Buenos Aires Province, Buenos Aires, Argentina. It broadcasts newsmagazines, music and some religious shows from EWTN. Its call letters are LRI 419.

== Programming ==
Air times are according to Argentina's time zone (UTC -3).

=== Weekdays ===
- Con algo al aire ("With something on the air", 9-10am) Diego Torres.
- El magazine de la mañana ("Morning magazine", 10-11am) Víctor Cáceres.
- Días de radio ("Days of radio", 11-1pm) Freddy Aguirre.
- El magazine de la tarde ("Afternoon magazine", 5-6pm) Víctor Cáceres.

=== Saturdays ===
- Los retro hits de la 90.3 ("90.3's retro hits", 6am-9pm and 11pm-6am)
- Dance floor (9-11pm)

=== Sundays ===
- Los retro hits de la 90.3 ("90.3's retro hits", 6-10am)
- Sunday Mass (10-11am)
