= KMMK (FM) =

Catholic radio station in Coggon, Iowa

- Coggon, Iowa; United States
- Broadcast area: Cedar Rapids
- Frequency: 88.7 MHz (HD Radio)
- Branding: Radio To The Max KMMK 88.7 FM

Programming
- Format: FM/HD1: Catholic
- Affiliations: EWTN Radio, Ave Maria Radio, Relevant Radio

Ownership
- Owner: PLUS Charities

History
- Call sign meaning: K St. Maximilian Mary Kolbe

Technical information
- Licensing authority: FCC
- Facility ID: 171762
- Class: C3
- ERP: 25,000 watts
- HAAT: 91 metres (299 ft)
- Transmitter coordinates: 42°16′13.7″N 91°32′22.0″W

Links
- Public license information: Public file; LMS
- Webcast: Listen Live
- Website: Official Website

KMMK (88.7 FM) is a radio station licensed to serve the community of Coggon, Iowa. The station is owned by PLUS Charities, and airs a Catholic radio format.

The station was assigned the KMMK call letters by the Federal Communications Commission on May 15, 2015.
