= KMME =

Radio station in Cottage Grove–Eugene, Oregon

Coordinates: 43.761°N 123.036°W

- Cottage Grove, Oregon; United States
- Broadcast area: Eugene-Springfield, Oregon
- Frequency: 100.5 MHz
- Branding: Mater Dei Radio

Programming
- Format: Catholic Religious (KBVM simulcast)

Ownership
- Owner: Catholic Broadcasting Northwest, Inc.

History
- Former call signs: KCGR (1993–2005); KDPM (2005–2011)

Technical information
- Licensing authority: FCC
- Facility ID: 66971
- Class: C3
- ERP: 10,500 watts
- HAAT: 154 meters (505 ft)
- Repeater: 94.9 K235BF (Eugene)

Links
- Public license information: Public file; LMS
- Webcast: Listen Live
- Website: materdeiradio.com

KMME (100.5 FM) is a commercial radio station in Cottage Grove, Oregon, broadcasting to the Eugene-Springfield, Oregon, area.

== History ==
In 1993, KCGR was first constructed by Robert L. O'renick through his company Thornton Pfleger, Inc. to serve the city of Cottage Grove at 100.5 MHz. It was a sister station to KNND, a local AM of the same owner.

In 2005, KCGR was purchased by Eugene businessman Steve Master through his new company Diamond Peak Media. Its call sign was changed to KDPM, and a new translator station K235BF (94.9 MHz) was erected in Eugene. On December 26, Steve Master and his vice president of content Ron Burley introduced the brand Success FM, a news-talk radio format that would "exclude religion and politics."

In December 2006, Success FM changed to the brand 94.9 JAMZ, ceasing news-talk and becoming a hip-hop / R&B music station.

In January 2011, Diamond Peak Investments LLC sold KDPM and FM translator K235BF to Catholic Broadcasting Northwest, Inc. for $700,000.

On May 1, 2011, KDPM stopped broadcasting as 94.9 JAMZ. On May 19, 2011, KDPM changed callsigns to KMME. On December 20, 2011, KMME returned to the air with a Catholic religious format, simulcasting KBVM 88.3 FM Portland, Oregon.

== Translators ==
The station is simulcasted on the following translator:

Call sign	Frequency	City of license	FID	ERP (W)	Class	FCC info
K235BF	94.9 FM	Eugene, Oregon	152399	99	D	LMS
