= WJOK =

Relevant Radio station in Kaukauna, Wisconsin, United States

- Kaukauna, Wisconsin; United States
- Broadcast area: Green Bay-Appleton-Oshkosh
- Frequency: 1050 kHz

Programming
- Format: Christian radio
- Network: Relevant Radio

Ownership
- Owner: Relevant Radio; (Relevant Radio, Inc.)

History
- First air date: September 25, 1965
- Former call signs: WKAU (1965–1984); WQWM (1984–1993); WSGC (1993–1999)
- Call sign meaning: "Jesus Our King"; "Jock" (former sports format)

Technical information
- Licensing authority: FCC
- Facility ID: 19879
- Class: B
- Power: 1,000 watts (day); 500 watts (night)
- Transmitter coordinates: 44°14′51″N 88°18′0.4″W
- Translators: 95.7 W239CV (Oshkosh); 107.9 W300CM (Appleton)

Links
- Public license information: Public file; LMS
- Webcast: Listen live
- Website: relevantradio.com

WJOK (1050 AM) is a Roman Catholic Christian formatted radio station licensed to Kaukauna, Wisconsin, that serves the Green Bay and Appleton-Oshkosh areas. The station is owned by the Green Bay-based Relevant Radio network and is the flagship station for Relevant Radio. To improve its local reach, the station broadcasts via FM translators W239CV (95.7 FM) in Oshkosh and W300CM (107.9 FM) in Appleton.

== History ==
The station first signed on the air on September 25, 1965, using the call letters WKAU. During this era, it operated with a Top 40 format and was frequently associated with its FM sister station, WKAU-FM. In 1984, Milwaukee-based broadcaster Quinn Martin purchased the station and changed the call letters to WQWM (reflecting his initials) to launch an oldies music format.

Ownership changed again in 1993, at which point the call sign was updated to WSGC to accommodate a "Positive Country" music format. By 1999, the station pivoted to an all-sports identity branded as "1050 The Jock" under the call letters WJOK. During its time as a sports station, it carried syndicated programming from the Sports Fan Radio Network and served as the local affiliate for Wisconsin Timber Rattlers baseball.

In 2000, the station was acquired by Starboard Broadcasting, a group of Catholic businessmen that included Bob Atwell and John Cavil. On November 26, 2000—the Solemnity of Christ the King—WJOK broadcast a Catholic Mass from the Cathedral of St. Francis Xavier in Green Bay, marking the official start of the Relevant Radio network. The station is often cited as the "birthplace" of the network, which has since grown to more than 200 stations across the United States.

After switching to Catholic programming, the station owners re-designated the "WJOK" call sign to stand for "Jesus Our King," a religious interpretation of the letters originally chosen for the former "Jock" sports format.
