= WSDZ =

Radio station in Belleville, Illinois

- Belleville, Illinois; United States
- Broadcast area: Greater St. Louis
- Frequency: 1260 kHz
- Branding: Relevant Radio

Programming
- Language: English
- Format: Catholic radio
- Network: Relevant Radio

Ownership
- Owner: Relevant Radio, Inc.

History
- First air date: July 13, 1947
- Former call signs: WIBV (1947–1998)
- Call sign meaning: "St. Louis Disney" (former owner)

Technical information
- Licensing authority: FCC
- Facility ID: 4622
- Class: B
- Power: 20,000 watts (day); 5,000 watts (night)
- Transmitter coordinates: 38°27′31.00″N 89°57′41.00″W
- Translator: 95.1 K236CS (St. Louis)

Links
- Public license information: Public file; LMS
- Webcast: Listen live
- Website: www.relevantradio.com

WSDZ (1260 kHz) is a radio station licensed to Belleville, Illinois, and serving the Greater St. Louis radio market. It is owned and operated by Relevant Radio, Inc. WSDZ carries a Catholic radio format supplied by the Relevant Radio network. WSDZ, along with 1120 KMOX, are responsible for activation of the St. Louis area Emergency Alert System.

By day, WSDZ is powered at 20,000 watts. At night, to avoid interfering with other stations on 1260 AM, it reduces power to 5,000 watts. It uses a directional antenna at all times. The station's studios are located on Weber Hill Road in St. Louis, and its transmitter is off Schuleter Germaine Road in Belleville. Programming is also heard on 99-watt FM translator 95.1 MHz K236CS in St. Louis.

== History ==
The station signed on the air on July 13, 1947, as WIBV "Belleville's Voice". It was a daytimer, broadcasting on 1060 kHz with 250 watts of power. WIBV was owned by Belleville Broadcasting Co.

WIBV aired various types of music, and would broadcast high school sports into the Metro-East area for many years, until the mid-1990s, when it became a talk radio station.

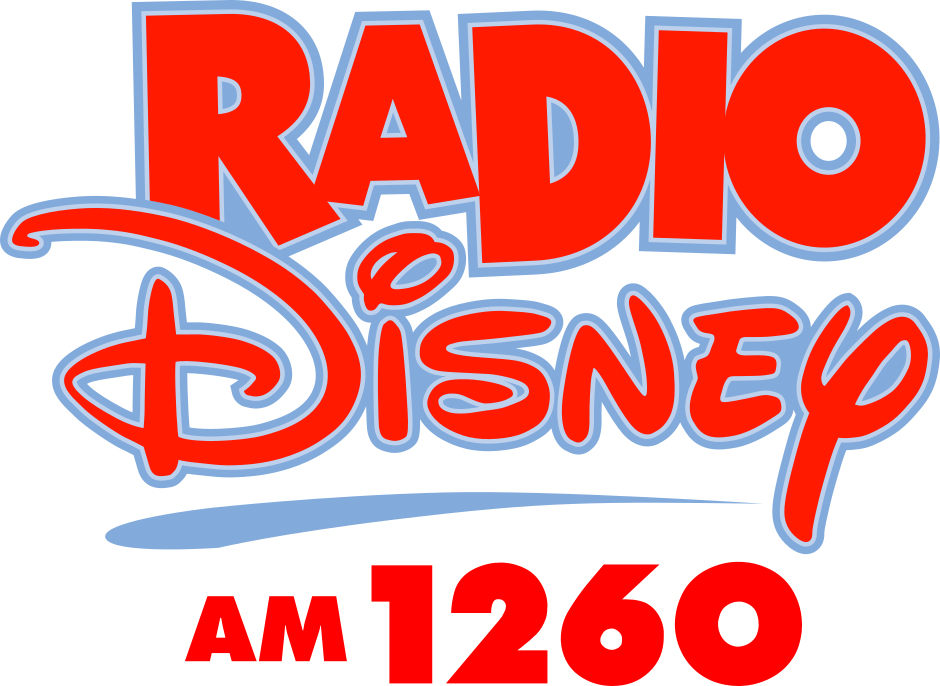
WSDZ logo used from 2002 until 2007.

The call sign switched to WSDZ when it began broadcasting children's/teen pop programming as a network affiliate of Radio Disney on May 22, 1998, at 1 pm. At that point, the talk programming moved over to 550 KSD, which became KTRS in early 1997.

On August 13, 2014, Radio Disney announced it would sell nearly all of its owned-and-operated stations including WSDZ. Radio Disney said it wanted to focus on the network's programming, co-branded events, and digital outlets.

Disney originally planned to take the stations dark on September 26. However, Disney changed its plans at the last minute, and all stations would remain on the air, continuing to broadcast Radio Disney programming until each were sold. Radio Disney planned to keep only one of its stations, its outlet at 1110 AM in Los Angeles, now KWVE.

On September 15, 2015, the Salem Media Group said it would acquire the last five Radio Disney owned-and-operated stations for sale (including WSDZ) for $2.225 million. WSDZ was acquired through Caron Broadcasting, Inc., for $275,000. The sale of WSDZ was completed on December 18, 2015.

On December 11, Radio Disney programming went off the air and WSDZ went silent, pending its new format. On December 22, WSDZ signed back on the air with a new conservative talk radio format as "1260 AM The Answer". Most of the programming came from the co-owned Salem Radio Network.

On October 30, 2017, WSDZ changed from conservative talk radio (which moved to sister station 1380 KXFN). It began playing urban contemporary gospel music, branded as "Praise 95.1 & 1260".

On November 14, 2019, the station was sold to Immaculate Heart Media, Inc., and became an affiliate of the co-owned Relevant Radio network. The programming included Catholic talk and teaching shows.
