= KTEK =

- Alvin, Texas; United States
- Broadcast area: Greater Houston
- Frequency: 1110 kHz
- Branding: Relevant Radio

Programming
- Language: English
- Format: Catholic talk radio
- Affiliations: Relevant Radio

Ownership
- Owner: Relevant Radio, Inc.

History
- First air date: March 18, 1980; 46 years ago
- Call sign meaning: TEKxas (Texas)

Technical information
- Licensing authority: FCC
- Facility ID: 10827
- Class: D
- Power: 2,500 watts day and critical hours
- Transmitter coordinates: 29°22′51″N 95°14′15″W
- Translator: See § Translator

Links
- Public license information: Public file; LMS
- Webcast: Listen live
- Website: relevantradio.com

KTEK (1110 AM) – branded Relevant Radio – is a non-commercial Catholic radio station licensed to Alvin, Texas. Owned by Relevant Radio, Inc., the station serves Greater Houston but does not broadcast any local programming, instead functioning as a repeater for the Relevant Radio network. KTEK also simulcasts over three Houston licensed translators K222CX (92.3 FM), K241CM (96.1 FM) and K245CQ (96.9 FM). The KTEK transmitter is located in Alvin, while the transmitter for K241CM resides in Friendswood and the K245CQ transmitter is near MacGregor Drive and Texas State Highway 288, just south of downtown Houston.

KTEK broadcasts only during the daytime as a Class D facility because it shares its frequency with clear channel KFAB in Omaha, Nebraska, while the translators maintain the 24 hour network schedule.

== Translator ==
Broadcast translators for KTEK
Call sign	Frequency	City of license	FID	ERP (W)	HAAT	Class	FCC info	Notes
K222CX	92.3 FM	Houston, Texas	148484	250	58 m (190 ft)	D	LMS	n/a
K241CM	96.1 FM	Houston, Texas	140620	250	304 m (997 ft)	D	LMS	First air date: December 30, 2016
K245CQ	96.9 FM	Houston, Texas	86982	50	199 m (653 ft)	D	LMS	First air date: September 24, 2002

== History ==
KTEK in the 1990s once featured Vietnamese language programming and was declared the Voice of Vietnam in Houston. Salem Communications then acquired the station for its Christian-related programming. Then on December 11, 2007, Biz Radio bought the station as part of breaking away from a lease agreement with Multicultural Broadcasting's KXYZ, making KTEK the first Biz Radio O&O station. The signal is much weaker than that of its previous affiliate KXYZ. On March 16, 2010, KTEK was sold back to Salem. The deal included the cancellation of BizRadio's 2008 loan from Salem, estimated to be worth $1.26 million USD. Salem also received $800,000 in cash, but BizRadio was allowed the opportunity "purchase airtime for programming on certain stations" owned by Salem, according to the agreement.

On August 15, 2019, Salem Communications announced its intent to sell KTEK, and the 96.1 translator relaying it, to Immaculate Heart Media. Immaculate Heart Media assumed control of the facility on November 14, 2019, and it became an affiliate of Relevant Radio.
