= WDTF-LP =

- Berkeley Springs, West Virginia; United States
- Broadcast area: Berkeley Springs, West Virginia
- Frequency: 107.9 MHz
- Branding: WDTF The Defender

Programming
- Format: Catholic Religious
- Affiliations: Relevant Radio; EWTN Radio

Ownership
- Owner: Defenders of the Faith, Inc.

History
- First air date: 2004
- Call sign meaning: W The DeFender

Technical information
- Licensing authority: FCC
- Facility ID: 135458
- Class: L1
- ERP: 100 watts
- HAAT: 29 meters
- Transmitter coordinates: 39°37′1.0″N 78°13′0.0″W

Links
- Public license information: LMS
- Website: WDTF-LP Online

WDTF-LP (107.9 FM) is a Catholic religious formatted low-power broadcast radio station licensed to and serving Berkeley Springs, West Virginia, United States. WDTF-LP is owned and operated by Defenders of the Faith, Inc.

== Translators ==
WDTF-LP programming is also carried on a broadcast translator station to extend or improve the coverage area of the station. Defenders of the Faith, Inc. have three other applications for translators with the FCC to be located in Winchester, Virginia, Martinsburg, West Virginia, and Hagerstown, Maryland.

Call sign	Frequency	City of license	FID	ERP (W)	Class	FCC info
W242AR	(96.3 FM) FM	Hancock, Maryland	145549	19	D	LMS
