= Relevant Radio =

Catholic talk radio network in the United States

- Type: Radio network
- Country: United States

Programming
- Format: Catholic radio

Ownership
- Key people: Rev. Francis Joseph Hoffman, JCD, CEO and Chairman of the Board

History
- Launch date: December 12, 2000

Coverage
- Availability: United States

Links
- Webcast: Listen live
- Website: www.relevantradio.com

Relevant Radio (corporate name Relevant Radio, Inc.) is a radio network in the United States, mainly broadcasting talk radio and religious programming involving the Catholic Church. Relevant Radio broadcasts "talk radio for Catholic life" over a network of 205 stations and through its website and app. Relevant Radio owns and operates 132 stations, and distributes programs to an additional 73 affiliates.

Relevant Radio is a 501(c)(3) non-profit organization headquartered in Lincolnshire, Illinois, with additional studios in Green Bay, Wisconsin.

The network airs a variety of programming aimed at Catholics and others interested in the Catholic Church.

== History ==
The network was founded by a group of Catholic businessmen, including Bob Atwell and John Cavil (who purchased Kaukauna, Wisconsin-licensed station WJOK in 2000) and Mark Follett, the owner of Anchor Foods, an Appleton-based distributor of frozen appetizers known for its marketing of jalapeño poppers, which had been sold to Heinz and its proceeds being used to launch the network under the non-profit Starboard Media Foundation.

WJOK's call sign, which formerly designated its sports radio format, now instead stood for the phrase Jesus, Our King. The network soft-launched on November 26, 2000, and considers December 12 its official launch date to honor the feast days of both Our Lady of Guadalupe and John Paul II, whom Starboard considers its unofficial patron saints.

"Morning Air", which the network describes as "a classic drive-time format that combines inspiration & entertainment" was the first program developed by Relevant Radio in 2003.

On October 13, 2016, Relevant Radio announced that it would merge with Loomis, California-based Immaculate Heart Radio, which owned and operated 36 stations in the western United States at the time of the merger. The merger was completed on July 31, 2017, with all stations being licensed to Immaculate Heart Media, Inc., while Relevant Radio continued as the on-air branding. The corporate name was changed to Relevant Radio, Inc. in February 2020.

In 2019, Immaculate Heart Media purchased 13 AM stations and seven translators from Salem Media Group.

In October 2019, Immaculate Heart purchased the six radio stations owned by Northern Michigan-based Baraga Broadcasting, as well as assuming the LMA of affiliate station WMQU, which is currently owned by Blarney Stone Broadcasting. On May 17, 2021, the five stations carrying Relevant Radio's Spanish-language service began carrying the English-language network.

== Station list ==
=== English language stations ===
Owned and operated stations
State	Location	Call sign	Frequency	Area
Arizona	Glendale	K275CP	102.9	Phoenix metropolitan area
Arizona	Phoenix	KIHP	1310	Mesa
Arizona	Tucson	K285DL	104.9	Tucson
California	Bakersfield	KJPG	1050	Bakersfield area
California	Bakersfield	K294DK	106.7	Bakersfield
California	Carlsbad	K257FV	99.3	Carlsbad
California	Eureka	KIHH	1400	Eureka
California	Fresno	K264CK	100.7	Fresno
California	Greenville	KPJP	89.3	Greenville
California	Lemoore	KJOP	1240	Lemoore (Hanford)
California	Lemoore	K231DC	94.1	Armona
California	Los Angeles	KHJ	930	Los Angeles metropolitan area
California	Madera	KHOT	1250	Madera-Fresno area
California	Modesto	KMPH	840	Modesto
California	Modesto	K250BR	97.9	Aurora, Modesto
California	Monterey	K271BP	102.1	Del Rey Oaks
California	Monterey	KYAA	1200	Monterey area
California	Rocklin	K249FJ	97.7	Rocklin
California	Sacramento	KSMH	1620	Sacramento area
California	San Bernardino	KKDD	1290	San Barnardino
California	San Diego	KCEO	1000	San Diego
California	San Francisco	K269FB	101.7	Nob Hill, San Francisco
California	San Francisco	KSFB	1260	San Francisco Bay Area
California	San Luis Obispo	KIHC	890	San Luis Obispo and Santa Maria
California	Stockton	KWG	1230	Stockton
California	Stockton	K224FB	92.7	Garden Acres
California	Truckee	K227AW	93.3	Truckee
California	Walnut Creek	K285FA	104.9	Contra Costa County
Colorado	Denver	KDMT	1690	Denver
Connecticut	Hartford	WLAT	910	Hartford
Connecticut	Hartford	W269DE	101.7	New Britain
Florida	Atlantic Beach	WZNZ	1600	Atlantic Beach
Florida	Atlantic Beach	W229CZ	93.7	Sandalwood, Jacksonville
Florida	Eustis	WIGW	90.3	Eustis
Florida	Fort Lauderdale	WQOS	1080	Miami–Fort Lauderdale
Florida	Fort Myers	WMYR	1410	Fort Myers
Florida	Fort Myers Beach	W294AN	106.7	Cape Coral
Florida	Jacksonville	WQOP	1460	Jacksonville
Florida	Miami	W249DM	97.7	West Miami
Florida	Miami	WQOS	1080	Downtown Miami
Florida	Naples	WCNZ	1660	Marco Island
Florida	Naples	W227DX	93.3	Naples
Florida	Orlando	WHOO	1080	Kissimmee
Florida	St. Petersburg	WWMI	1380	St. Petersburg
Florida	St. Petersburg	W260DM	99.9	St. Petersburg
Georgia	Atlanta	WAFS	1190	Atlanta
Hawaii	Honolulu	KORL HD4	101.1	Honolulu
Hawaii	Honolulu	K280FC	103.9	Honolulu
Hawaii	Maui	KCIK	740	Maui County
Illinois	Chicago	WKBM	930	Aurora
Illinois	Chicago	WSFS	950	Chicago
Illinois	Dupage County	W256DU	99.1	Dupage County
Indiana	Anderson	W252CY	98.3	Anderson
Indiana	Coatesville	WSPM	89.1	Coatesville
Indiana	Fort Wayne	WRDF	106.3	Fort Wayne
Indiana	Gary	W268DI	101.5	New Elliott
Indiana	Gary	WWCA	1270	Gary
Indiana	Indianapolis	WSOM	89.5	Shelbyville
Indiana	Lafayette	W232DV	94.3	Lafayette
Indiana	Noblesville	WSQM	90.9	Noblesville
Indiana	South Bend	WRDI	95.7	South Bend
Kentucky	Lexington	WMJR	1380	Lexington
Kentucky	Lexington	W235AK	94.9	Georgetown
Maine	Augusta	WWTP	89.5	Augusta
Maine	Bangor	WXBP	90.3	Corinth
Maine	Bath	WTBP	89.7	Bath/Brunswick
Maine	Portland	WXTP	106.7	Portland
Maine	Presque Isle	WEGP	1390	Presque Isle/Caribou
Maryland	Baltimore	WBMD	750	Baltimore
Massachusetts	Boston	WWDJ	1150	Boston
Michigan	Alpena	WGZR	88.9	Alpena
Michigan	Charlevoix	WTCK	90.9	Charlevoix/Petoskey
Michigan	Detroit	WKEG	1030	Hamtramck
Michigan	Detroit	W284BQ	104.7	Clinton Township
Michigan	Detroit	W232CA	94.3	Oak Park
Michigan	East Tawas	WGJU	91.3	Tawas City/East Tawas
Michigan	Holly	W231CV	94.1	Auburn Hills
Michigan	Rochester Hills	W276DB	103.1	Rochester Hills
Michigan	St. Ignace	WIDG	940	St. Ignace
Michigan	Traverse City	WTCY	88.3	Traverse City
Minnesota	Minneapolis	WLOL	1330	Minneapolis
Missouri	St. Louis	WSDZ	1260	St. Louis
Missouri	St. Louis	K236CS	95.1	St. Louis
Nevada	Las Vegas	KNIH	970	Las Vegas metropolitan area
Nevada	Reno	KIHM	920	Reno
New Jersey	Newark	WNSW	1430	Newark
New Jersey	Oakland	WVNJ	1160	Oakland
New Jersey	Trenton	WWJZ	640	Trenton
New Mexico	Albuquerque	KQNM	1550	Albuquerque
New Mexico	Albuquerque	K255AU	98.9	Madrid
New Mexico	Clovis	K219DR	91.7	Clovis
New Mexico	Farmington	K237EQ	95.3	Farmington
New Mexico	Milan	KXXQ	100.7	Milan
New Mexico	Portales	K204DB	88.7	Portales
New Mexico	Roswell	K203ES	88.5	Roswell
New Mexico	Santa Fe	K283AQ	104.5	Santa Fe
New Mexico	Socorro	K260AR	99.9	Socorro
New Mexico	Tucumcari	K202EF	88.3	Tucumcari
Ohio	Cincinnati	WNKN	105.9	Cincinnati
Ohio	Dayton	WNKN	105.9	Dayton
Ohio	Toledo	WPAY	1520	Toledo
Ohio	Toledo	W231EF	94.1	Toledo
Ohio	Youngstown	W298CX	107.5	Boardman
Ohio	Youngstown	WHKZ	1440	Youngtown
Pennsylvania	Philadelphia	WWJZ	640	Philadelphia
Pennsylvania	Pittsburgh	W292DH	106.3	McCandless
Pennsylvania	Pittsburgh	WWSW HD3	94.5	Pittsburgh
Rhode Island	Providence	WSJW	550	Providence
Rhode Island	Warwick	W298DE	107.5	Warick
Texas	Alvin	K241CM	96.1	Alvin (Galveston)
Texas	Austin	K280GN	103.9	Allendale
Texas	Austin	KYOW	970	Austin
Texas	Brownsville/Harlingen	KJJF	88.9	Harlingen
Texas	Dallas	KEXB	1440	Dallas–Fort Worth
Texas	El Paso	KLPS	91.5	El Paso
Texas	Houston	KTEK	1110	Houston
Texas	Houston	K245CQ	1110	Bellaire
Texas	McAllen	KHID	88.1	McAllen
Texas	Round Rock	K286CX	105.1	Round Rock
Texas	San Antonio	KRDY	1160	San Antonio
Texas	Spring	K222CX	92.3	Spring (The Woodlands)
Utah	Salt Lake City	KIHU	1010	Salt Lake City metropolitan area
Virginia	Richmond	W267CB	101.3	Bellwood
Virginia	Richmond	WREJ	990	Richmond
Washington, D.C.	Washington	WQOF	1260	Washington metropolitan area
Washington (state)	Seattle	KLFE	1590	Seattle
Wisconsin	Eau Claire	WDVM	1050	Eau Claire
Wisconsin	Eau Claire	W300DB	107.9	Mount Hope Corners
Wisconsin	Green Bay	WJOK	1050	Green Bay
Wisconsin	La Crosse	WKBH	1570	La Crosse
Wisconsin	La Crosse	W231DL	94.1	Holmen
Wisconsin	Madison	WHFA	1240	Madison
Wisconsin	Middleton	W247CI	97.3	Madison
Wisconsin	Milwaukee	WSJP-FM	100.1	West Bend
Wisconsin	Milwaukee	WSJP	1640	Milwaukee
Wisconsin	Pewaukee	W260DP	99.9	Pewaukee
Wisconsin	Wausau	WYNW	92.9	Wausau
Wisconsin	Wisconsin Rapids	WMMA-FM	93.9	Wisconsin Rapids
Stations owned by another company
State	Location	Callsign	Frequency	Area
Alabama	Fairhope	WNGL	1410	Mobile
Alabama	Fairhope	W233CX	94.5	Fairhope
Arizona	Flagstaff	KXGC-LP	98.5	Flagstaff
Arizona	Payson	KPIH-LP	98.9	Payson
Arkansas	Rogers	KDUA-LP	96.5	Rogers
California	Brawley	K227BN	93.3	Brawley
California	El Centro	KCJP-LP	95.7	El Centro
California	Escondido	KFSD	1450	Escondido
California	Palm Desert	KXCP-LP	97.1	Palm Desert
California	Redding	KLXR	1230	Redding
California	San Diego	KCZP-LP	93.7	San Diego
Florida	Palm Beaches	WPBV-LP	98.3	Palm Beach
Florida	Palm City	WJPP-LP	100.1	Palm City
Georgia	Athens	WXPB-LP	105.7	Athens
Illinois	Decatur	WDCR	88.9	Decatur
Illinois	Decatur	W243DF	96.5	Elwin
Illinois	Galena	W220EQ	91.9	Galena
Indiana	Bloomington	WCYI-LP	104.1	Bloomington
Indiana	Columbia City	WRDF	106.3	Columbia City
Indiana	Evansville	WIAH-LP	103.5	Evansville
Indiana	Trafalgar	WTTS-HD	92.3	Trafalgar
Iowa	Charles City	KQOP-LP	94.7	Charles City
Iowa	Clinton	KXJX-LP	92.5	Clinton
Iowa	Coggon	KMMK	88.7	Cedar Rapids
Iowa	Davenport	K237FP	95.3	Panorama Park
Iowa	Davenport	KTJT-LP	103.1	Davenport
Iowa	DeWitt	KGYS-LP	92.5	DeWitt
Iowa	Dubuque	KCRD-LP	98.3	Dubuque
Iowa	Dyersville	KGDR-LP	106.7	Dyersville
Iowa	Iowa City	KOUR-LP	92.7	Iowa City
Iowa	Kalona	KMHV	89.5	Kalona
Iowa	Marshalltown	KCRM-LP	96.7	Marshalltown
Maine	Fort Kent	WFHP-LP	97.5	Fort Kent
Maine	Springvale	WSVP-LP	105.7	Springvale
Maryland	Eldersburg	WSJF-LP	92.7	Eldersburg
Maryland	Hancock	W242AR	96.3	Hancock
Michigan	Stephenson	WVFC-LP	102.1	Stephenson
Minnesota	Perham	KXPM-LP	100.3	Perham
Minnesota	St. Cloud	KYES	1180	St. Cloud
Minnesota	St. Joseph	K228FV	93.5	St. Joseph
Minnesota	Verndale	K267CU	101.3	Staples
Minnesota	Verndale	KSKK	1070	Verndale
Missouri	Kansas City	K275BQ	102.9	Kansas City
Missouri	Kansas City	K284CH	104.7	Raytown
Missouri	Liberty	KCXL	1140	Liberty
Montana	Bozeman	KOFK-FM	88.1	Bozeman
Montana	Helena	KNEH-LP	97.3	Helena
Montana	Kalispell	KOFC-LP	107.1	Kalispell
New York	Poughkeepsie	WJVQ-LP	94.7	Staatsburg
New York	Shenorock	WKBR-LP	102.3	Yorktown Heights
North Carolina	Raleigh	WETC	540	Raleigh
North Carolina	Wake Forest	WFNE-LP	103.5	Wake Forest
North Carolina	Wilmington	WBPL-LP	93.1	Riverfront, Wilmington
Ohio	Boardman	WILB	89.5	Boardman
Ohio	Canton (Akron)	WILB	1060	Canton
Ohio	Canton	W233CE	94.5	North Canton
Ohio	Hillsboro	WLRU-LP	106.9	Hillsboro
Oregon	Eugene	K235BF	94.9	Eugene-Springfield
Oregon	Springfield	KMME	100.5	Eugene-Springfield
Oregon	Portland	KBVM	88.3	Portland
Tennessee	Cookeville	WRIM	89.9	Cookeville
Tennessee	Lebanon	WRSN	88.1	Lebanon
Tennessee	Nashville	WBOU-LP	100.5	Nashville
Texas	College Station	KEDC	88.5	College Station
Texas	Corpus Christi	KLUX	89.5-HD2	Corpus Christi
Texas	Lorena	KYAR	98.3	Waco
Texas	Palestine	KINF-LP	107.9	Palestine
Virginia	Front Royal	WXDM	90.3	Front Royal
Virginia	Winchester	WHFW	89.7	Winchester
Washington	Leavenworth	KUVB-LP	103.3	Leavenworth
Washington	Vancouver	KBVM	88.3	Vancouver
West Virginia	Berkeley Springs	WDTF-LP	107.9	Berkeley Springs
Wisconsin	Ashland	WWMD-LP	94.3	Ashland
Wisconsin	Marinette	WLCJ-LP	92.5	Marinette
Wisconsin	Oconto Falls	WPPS-LP	92.9	Oconto Falls
Wisconsin	Peshtigo	W270BC	101.9	Peshtigo
Wisconsin	Platteville	WPBO-LP	104.7	Platteville
Wisconsin	Rhinelander	KSPP	89.1	Rhinelander
Wisconsin	Shawano	WRGW-LP	94.5	Shawano

=== Former Spanish language stations ===
Owned and operated stations
State	Location	Call sign	Frequency	Area
Florida	Atlantic Beach	WZNZ	1600	Jacksonville
Florida	St. Petersburg	WWMI	1380	Tampa Bay
Florida	Winter Park	WHOO	1080	Greater Orlando
Illinois	Granite City	KXFN	1380	St. Louis
Indiana	Gary	WWCA	1270	Northwest Indiana
Texas	Harlingen	KJJF	88.9	Rio Grande Valley
Texas	McAllen	KHID	88.1	Rio Grande Valley

== See also ==
- Sheila Liaugminas

== Sources ==
- "Catholic network calls Green Bay home", Green Bay News-Chronicle, date uncertain, 2004. (Newspaper now defunct)
