= KRDY =

Radio station in San Antonio

- San Antonio, Texas; United States
- Broadcast area: San Antonio metropolitan area
- Frequency: 1160 kHz
- Branding: Relevant Radio

Programming
- Format: Catholic radio
- Network: Relevant Radio

Ownership
- Owner: Relevant Radio, Inc.

History
- First air date: November 13, 1961
- Former call signs: KBER (1961–1978); KFHM (1978–1991); KVAR (1991–1993); KENS (1993–2004)
- Former frequencies: 1150 kHz (1961–1985)
- Call sign meaning: Former Radio Disney affiliation

Technical information
- Licensing authority: FCC
- Facility ID: 26310
- Class: B
- Power: 10,000 watts (days); 1,000 watts (nights)
- Transmitter coordinates: 29°32′11″N 98°41′11″W

Links
- Public license information: Public file; LMS
- Webcast: Listen live
- Website: relevantradio.com

KRDY (1160 AM) is a noncommercial radio station licensed to San Antonio, Texas, United States, featuring Catholic radio programming as an owned and operated outlet of Relevant Radio. KRDY's transmitter is located off Braun Road, near Loop 1604, in San Antonio.

== History ==
=== KBER: 1961-1978 ===
On November 13, 1961, the station signed on as KBER. It was a daytime only station on 1150 kHz. KBER was owned by Kepo Broadcasting. It was powered at 1,000 watts using a three-tower directional antenna (DA) system.

The DA was needed to protect co-channel stations KZNE in College Station, and KCCT in Corpus Christi. As KBER was west of KZNE and north of KCCT, the system reduced KBER's signal across an arc toward the KZNE and KCCT service areas.

The towers and studios were on Alma Drive just outside the future Loop 410. The area would later be dubbed "KBER Square". On June 25, 1966, KBER-FM signed on at 100.3 FM. The two stations would simulcast their programming. Because KBER was off the air at night, KBER-FM allowed programming to be heard around the clock. KBER-FM is now KCYY.

=== KFHM: 1978‒1991 ===
On May 31, 1978, the station became KFHM, which stood for the new owner's name, Felix H. Morales. It was a Tejano music/Latin music radio station that mostly played music in Spanish while featuring bilingual announcing. The frequency changed to 1160 kHz in the mid 1980s, giving it increased coverage and full time authorization. Power was boosted to 10,000 watts by day and 1,000 watts by night from a site west of San Antonio.

=== KVAR: 1991‒1993 ===
On August 26, 1991, the station changed its call sign from KFHM to KVAR.

=== KENS: 1993‒2004 ===
On October 15, 1993, the station changed its call sign from KVAR to KENS and adopted a Texas music format that included audio of the live newscasts of sister station KENS-TV (channel 5) before adopting a news/talk format roughly a year later.

On March 7, 2003, KENS was sold to ABC Radio for $3.2 million. It flipped to a children's radio format as an affiliate of Radio Disney on April 1 of that year.

=== KRDY: 2004‒present ===
On February 27, 2004, the station changed its call sign from KENS to KRDY. The call sign represented the name Radio Disney.

On June 4, 2013, Radio Disney announced that it would be selling seven radio stations, including KRDY, in an attempt to increase revenue and focus more on stations serving Top 25 markets. On September 28, 2013, KRDY dropped the Radio Disney affiliation and went silent. In October 2013, Radio Disney Group filed to sell KRDY and KDIS-FM in Little Rock to Salem Communications Corporation, owner of several other San Antonio-area radio stations. Salem's purchase, at a price of $2 million, was consummated on February 7, 2014. Salem used the station for its Spanish-language Christian radio format.

In February 2018, KRDY changed from Spanish Christian radio to conservative talk radio, branded as "Freedom 1160". It mostly carried programs from the Salem Radio Network, including Dennis Prager, Hugh Hewitt and Mike Gallagher.

In November 2019, the station was sold to Immaculate Heart Media, Inc. The station started airing Catholic talk radio programs as an affiliate of the Relevant Radio network.
