= WMMA-FM =

Coordinates: 44.223°N 89.830°W

- Nekoosa, Wisconsin; United States
- Broadcast area: Wisconsin Dells
- Frequency: 93.9 MHz
- Branding: Relevant Radio

Programming
- Format: Catholic radio
- Affiliations: Relevant Radio

Ownership
- Owner: Relevant Radio; (Relevant Radio, Inc.)

History
- Former call signs: WXEC (1992–2001); WZRK (2001); WDVM-FM (2001–2002)
- Call sign meaning: W Mother Mary Angelica

Technical information
- Licensing authority: FCC
- Facility ID: 4918
- Class: C3
- ERP: 18,000 watts
- HAAT: 112 meters

Links
- Public license information: Public file; LMS
- Webcast: Listen Live
- Website: WMMA Online

WMMA-FM (93.9 MHz) is a radio station in Nekoosa, Wisconsin. It is part of the Relevant Radio Christian network.
