= WQUA =

- Citronelle, Alabama; United States
- Broadcast area: Mobile metropolitan area
- Frequency: 102.1 MHz
- Branding: SonLife Radio Network

Programming
- Language: English
- Format: Christian radio
- Network: SonLife Radio

Ownership
- Owner: Jimmy Swaggart Ministries; (Family Worship Center Church, Inc.)
- Sister stations: WJFM

Technical information
- Licensing authority: FCC
- Facility ID: 39293
- Class: C3
- ERP: 15,000 watts
- HAAT: 130 meters (430 ft)
- Transmitter coordinates: 31°05′04″N 88°23′51″W

Links
- Public license information: Public file; LMS
- Webcast: Listen live
- Website: www.sonlifetv.com

WQUA (102.1 FM) is a radio station broadcasting a Christian radio format. Licensed to Citronelle, Alabama, the station broadcasts to the Mobile metropolitan area. The station is owned by Family Worship Center Church, Inc., part of evangelist Jimmy Swaggart's ministries.

== History ==
In April 2002, WQUA was sold to The Walt Disney Company, and the station switched to the Radio Disney children's network, with a contemporary hit radio format in August of that year.

In mid-October 2005, the station dropped the Radio Disney affiliation and switched to the current format. That's how the radio station was renamed "SonLife Radio Network".
