= WRGW-LP =

- Shawano, Wisconsin; United States
- Frequency: 94.5 MHz

Ownership
- Owner: Sacred Heart Educational Association

Technical information
- Licensing authority: FCC
- Facility ID: 132173
- Class: L1
- ERP: 100 watts
- HAAT: 4.7 meters (15 ft)
- Transmitter coordinates: 44°46′50.00″N 88°35′6.00″W

Links
- Public license information: LMS

WRGW-LP (94.5 FM) is a radio station licensed to Shawano, Wisconsin, United States. The station is currently owned by Sacred Heart Educational Association.
