= WDVM (AM) =

Coordinates: 44°46′37.9″N 91°28′29.6″W

- Eau Claire, Wisconsin; United States
- Frequency: 1050 kHz
- Branding: Relevant Radio

Programming
- Format: Catholic radio
- Network: Relevant Radio

Ownership
- Owner: Relevant Radio; (Relevant Radio, Inc.)

History
- First air date: April 1948
- Former call signs: WRFW (1948–1958); WECL (1958–1969); WOKL (1969–1986); WISM (1986–1993); WEIO (1993–2001)

Technical information
- Licensing authority: FCC
- Facility ID: 1131
- Class: B
- Power: 860 watts (day); 260 watts (night)
- Translator: 107.9 W300DB (Eau Claire)

Links
- Public license information: Public file; LMS
- Webcast: Listen live
- Website: www.relevantradio.com

WDVM (1050 AM) is a radio station in Eau Claire, Wisconsin, United States. It is part of Relevant Radio, a Catholic radio network.

From October 18, 1993 until January 30, 1998, WEIO was an affiliate of Radio AAHS children's network.
