= KBVM =

Catholic radio station in Portland, Oregon

- Portland, Oregon; United States
- Broadcast area: Portland, Oregon
- Frequency: 88.3 MHz
- Branding: Mater Dei Radio

Programming
- Format: Catholic Christian radio

Ownership
- Owner: Catholic Broadcasting Northwest

History
- First air date: December 8, 1989
- Call sign meaning: Blessed Virgin Mary

Technical information
- Licensing authority: FCC
- Facility ID: 41330
- Class: C2
- ERP: 3,500 watts
- HAAT: 437 meters (1,434 ft)
- Transmitter coordinates: 45°30′58″N 122°43′59″W
- Repeater: 100.5 KMME (Cottage Grove)

Links
- Public license information: Public file; LMS
- Webcast: Listen Live
- Website: materdeiradio.com

KBVM (88.3 FM) is a radio station broadcasting a Catholic Christian radio format. Licensed to Portland, Oregon, United States, the station serves the Portland, Oregon area. The station is currently owned by Catholic Broadcasting Northwest. The call letters are a reference to Mary, mother of Jesus's title the Blessed Virgin Mary, under whose patronage the station was placed at its dedication. On-air programming is simulcast in Eugene/Springfield on KMME, 100.5 FM and via an online stream.
