= WPOM =

Radio station in Florida, United States

- Riviera Beach, Florida; United States
- Broadcast area: West Palm Beach, Florida
- Frequency: 1600 kHz

Programming
- Format: Ethnic

Ownership
- Owner: Carline Clerge; (Caribbean Media Group, Inc.)

History
- First air date: August 17, 1959
- Last air date: February 2025
- Former call signs: WHEW (1959–1969); WXVI (1969–1971); WPOM (1971–1999); WMNE (1999–2010); WHTY (2010–2015)
- Call sign meaning: West; POM sounds equivalent to "Palm"

Technical information
- Licensing authority: FCC
- Facility ID: 73892
- Class: B
- Power: 5,000 watts (day); 4,700 watts (night)
- Transmitter coordinates: 26°44′56.2″N 80°07′57.2″W
- Translator: 101.1 W266DP (Delray Beach)

Links
- Public license information: Public file; LMS

WPOM (1600 kHz) was an AM radio station broadcasting ethnic programming. Licensed to Riviera Beach, Florida, United States, the station served the West Palm Beach area. The station was owned by Carline Clerge, through licensee Caribbean Media Group, Inc. It operated from 1959 to 2025.

== History ==
The station went on the air as WHEW on August 17, 1959. In 1969, the station changed its call letters to WXVI; by 1970, the station had a middle-of-the-road format. In 1971, the station became WPOM, with a contemporary format. In the intervening years, WPOM would adopt several other formats, including all-news in the late 1970s, disco music in the early 1980s, and a split format of gospel and blues by 1999.

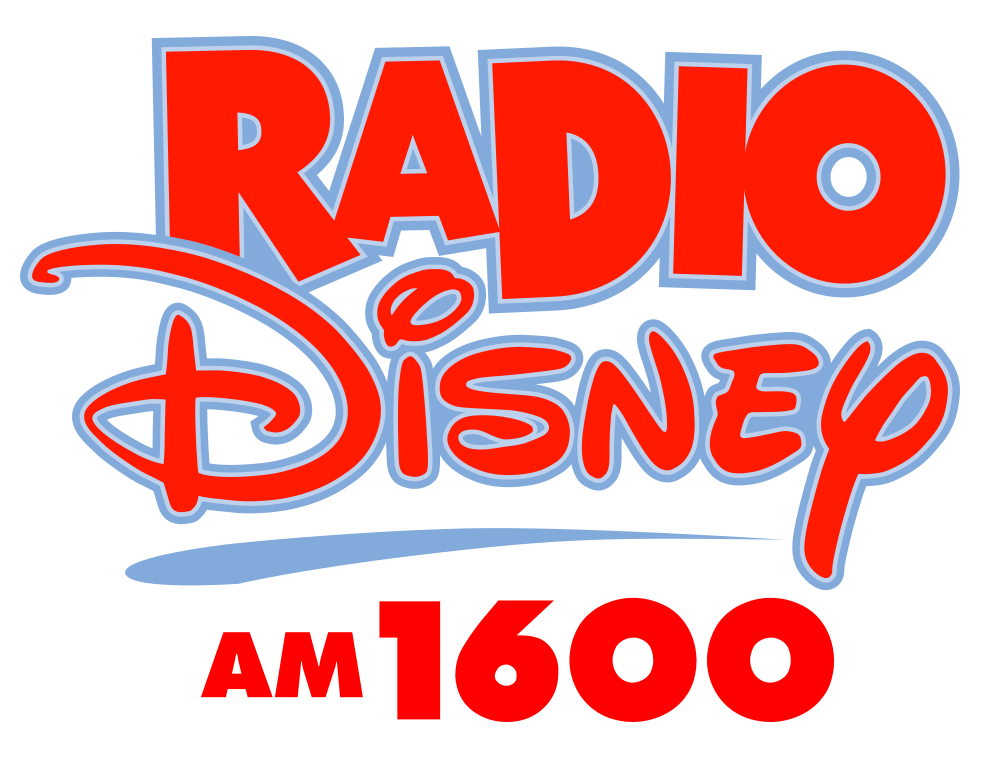
WMNE logo used from 2002 until 2007.

Hibernia Broadcasting, whose stations were all affiliated with Radio Disney, acquired WPOM in 1999, and switched the station to Radio Disney on June 16, 1999; to better reflect the format, the station adopted the WMNE callsign, referring to Minnie Mouse, on July 9. Hibernia was acquired by The Walt Disney Company, through ABC, in 2000.

Disney sold WMNE to Travis Media, LLC in January 2010. In the interim, Disney took the station, and five other stations slated to be sold, silent on January 22. The station resumed broadcasting on May 6; on June 2, the call letters were changed to WHTY.

In March 2015, Carline Clerge, who already owned 42% of the station, agreed to acquire the remaining 58% from Robert Travis and David Urbach; upon taking control on August 24, 2015, Clerge transferred WHTY from Travis Media to Caribbean Media Group, another company she controls. The call sign was changed back to WPOM on August 24, 2015.

WPOM went silent in February 2025, due to financial problems that had led Caribbean Media Group to put it up for sale. The Federal Communications Commission cancelled the station's license on September 16, 2026.
