= KDIS-FM =

Christian talk radio station in Little Rock, Arkansas, United States

- Little Rock, Arkansas; United States
- Frequency: 99.5 MHz
- Branding: Faith Talk 99.5

Programming
- Format: Christian talk and teaching
- Affiliations: SRN News

Ownership
- Owner: Salem Media Group; (Salem Communications Holding Corporation)
- Sister stations: KDXE

History
- First air date: July 26, 1991; 34 years ago
- Former call signs: KLVV (1991–1992); KYFX (1992–2003)
- Call sign meaning: "Kids Disney" (previous affiliation)

Technical information
- Licensing authority: FCC
- Facility ID: 47309
- Class: A
- ERP: 5,700 watts
- HAAT: 95 meters (312 ft)

Links
- Public license information: Public file; LMS
- Webcast: Listen live
- Website: faithtalk995.com

KDIS-FM (99.5 FM, "FaithTalk 99.5") is a commercial radio station in Little Rock, Arkansas. It airs a Christian talk and teaching radio format and is owned by the Salem Media Group, through licensee Salem Communications Holding Corporation. The studios are on McKinley Street in Little Rock and the transmitter tower is on West 8th Street off Interstate 630, also in Little Rock.

National religious leaders heard on KDIS-FM include Jim Daly, Chuck Swindoll, Alistair Begg, J. Vernon McGee, Charles Stanley, John MacArthur, David Jeremiah and Greg Laurie. KDIS-FM is a brokered programming station, where hosts pay for their time on the air and may seek donations to their ministries. Co-owned SRN News provides updates throughout the day.

== History ==
The station went on the air as KLVV on July 26, 1991. On February 1, 1992, the station changed its call sign to KYFX airing a Smooth Jazz/Urban Adult Contemporary hybrid format as "Foxy 99.5", later changing to an Urban AC format full-time airing The ABC Radio Networks "The Touch" format in dayparts. On August 7, 2003, the station switched calls to the current KDIS-FM.

On March 25, 2002, KYFX was sold to ABC Radio, and became Little Rock's affiliate for Radio Disney in September 2003.

In June 2013, Disney put KDIS-FM and six other Radio Disney stations in medium markets up for sale, to refocus the network's broadcast distribution on top-25 markets. On July 31, 2013, KDIS-FM dropped the Radio Disney affiliation and went silent. in October, Disney filed to sell KDIS-FM, as well as KRDY in San Antonio, Texas, to Salem Communications Corporation. The purchase by Salem, at a price of $2 million, was consummated on February 7, 2014.

On February 24, 2014, KDIS-FM returned to the air with Christian talk and teaching, branded as "Faith Talk 99.5".

== Previous logo ==
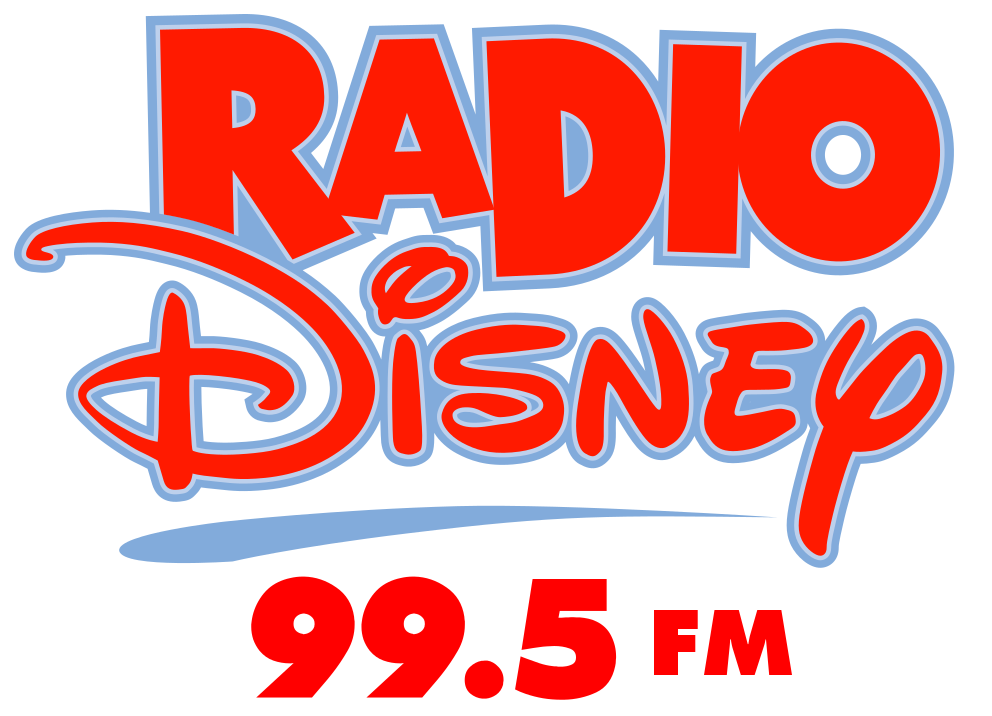
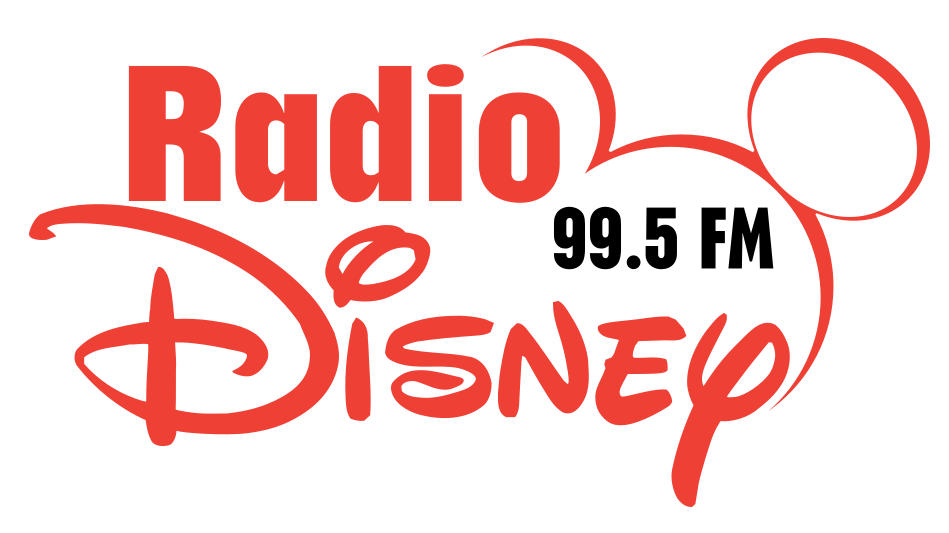
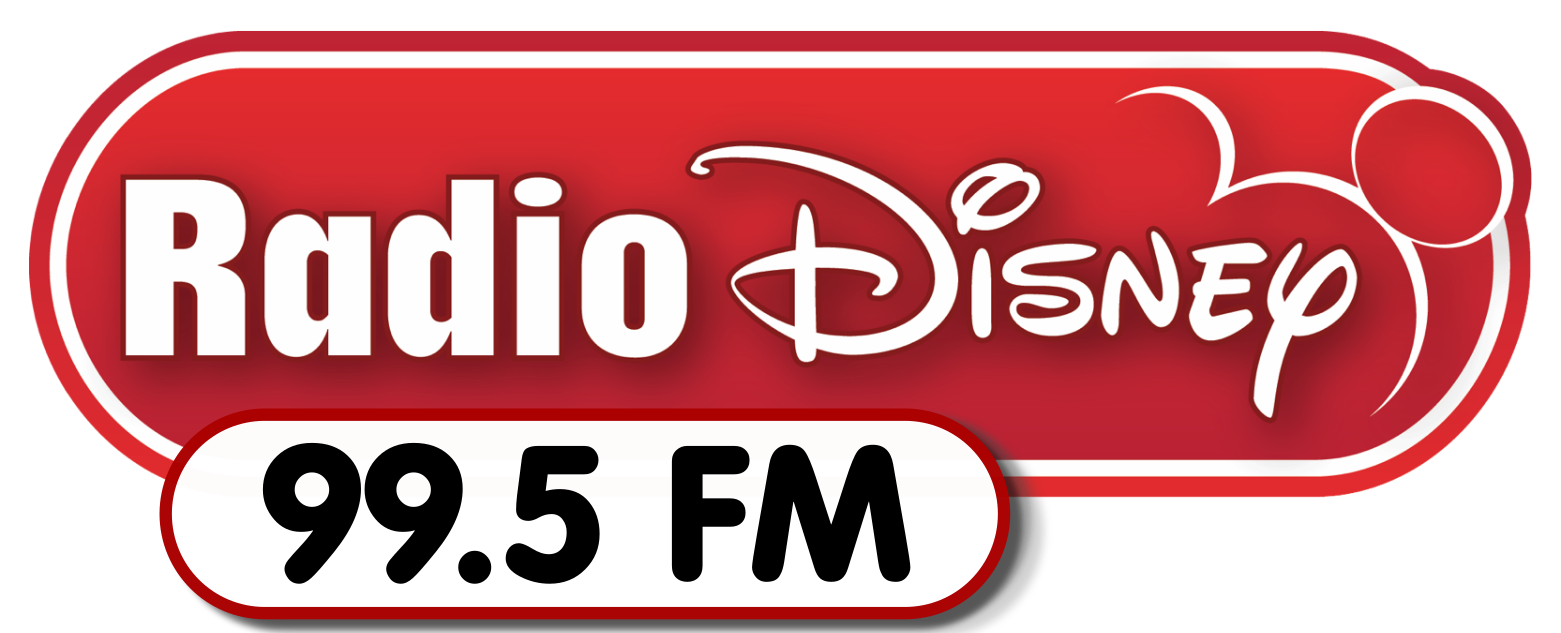
