= Immaculate Heart Radio =

Catholic radio network in the western United States

IHR Educational Broadcasting dba Immaculate Heart Radio operated a network of radio stations that aired Roman Catholic religious programming. The network provided a 24-hour a day schedule consisting of call-in talk shows, interviews and broadcasts of the Mass. Hosts periodically asked for financial donations to fund the network and the operation of its stations.

Immaculate Heart Radio's headquarters were located in Loomis, California. This location also served as its main broadcasting studio, where programming and production work was done for the stations within the network. The organization got its name from the Catholic devotion to the Immaculate Heart of Mary.

In October 2016, Immaculate Heart Radio and another Catholic radio network, Relevant Radio, announced plans to merge operations. Immaculate Heart Radio served the Western United States and had more than 30 stations in California, Nevada, Utah, Arizona and New Mexico, including 930 KHJ Los Angeles, 1260 KSFB San Francisco, 1000 KCEO San Diego and 1310 KIHP Phoenix. Relevant Radio's network was based mostly in the Midwest and Northeast. The merger was consummated on June 30, 2017; all the station licenses were assigned to Immaculate Heart Media, Inc., while the Relevant Radio name became the on-air branding for the network going forward. The corporate name was changed to Relevant Radio, Inc. in February 2020.
