= List of AM radio stations in the United States by call sign (initial letters KA–KF) =

This is a list of AM radio stations in the United States having call signs beginning with the letters KA to KF.

== KA-- ==
Callsign	Frequency	City of license
KAAA	1230 AM	Kingman, Arizona
KAAB	1130 AM	Batesville, Arkansas
KAAN	870 AM	Bethany, Missouri
KAAY	1090 AM	Little Rock, Arkansas
KABC	790 AM	Los Angeles
KABI	1560 AM	Abilene, Kansas
KABN	960 AM	Kenai, Alaska
KABQ	1350 AM	Albuquerque, New Mexico
KACH	1340 AM	Preston, Idaho
KACI	1300 AM	The Dalles, Oregon
KACT	1360 AM	Andrews, Texas
KADA	1230 AM	Ada, Oklahoma
KADR	1400 AM	Elkader, Iowa
KADS	1240 AM	Elk City, Oklahoma
KAFF	930 AM	Flagstaff, Arizona
KAFN	690 AM	Benton, Arkansas
KAFY	1100 AM	Bakersfield, California
KAGC	1510 AM	Bryan, Texas
KAGE	1580 AM	Van Buren, Arkansas
KAGH	800 AM	Crossett, Arkansas
KAGI	930 AM	Grants Pass, Oregon
KAGO	1150 AM	Klamath Falls, Oregon
KAGV	1110 AM	Big Lake, Alaska
KAGY	1510 AM	Port Sulphur, Louisiana
KAHI	950 AM	Auburn, California
KAHL	1310 AM	San Antonio, Texas
KAHZ	1600 AM	Pomona, California
KAJO	1270 AM	Grants Pass, Oregon
KAKC	1300 AM	Tulsa, Oklahoma
KAKK	1570 AM	Walker, Minnesota
KALE	960 AM	Richland, Washington
KALI	900 AM	West Covina, California
KALL	700 AM	North Salt Lake, Utah
KALM	1290 AM	Thayer, Missouri
KALV	1430 AM	Alva, Oklahoma
KAMA	750 AM	El Paso, Texas
KAMI	1580 AM	Cozad, Nebraska
KAML	990 AM	Kenedy–Karnes City, Texas
KAMM	1540 AM	University Park, Texas
KAMP	1430 AM	Aurora, Colorado
KAMQ	1240 AM	Carlsbad, New Mexico
KAND	1340 AM	Corsicana, Texas
KANE	1240 AM	New Iberia, Louisiana
KANI	1500 AM	Wharton, Texas
KANN	1120 AM	Roy, Utah
KAOI	1110 AM	Kihei, Hawaii
KAOK	1400 AM	Lake Charles, Louisiana
KAPE	1550 AM	Cape Girardeau, Missouri
KAPR	930 AM	Douglas, Arizona
KAPS	660 AM	Mount Vernon, Washington
KARI	550 AM	Blaine, Washington
KARN	920 AM	Little Rock, Arkansas
KARR	1460 AM	Kirkland, Washington
KART	1400 AM	Jerome, Idaho
KARV	610 AM	Russellville, Arkansas
KASI	1430 AM	Ames, Iowa
KASL	1240 AM	Newcastle, Wyoming
KASM	1150 AM	Albany, Minnesota
KASO	1240 AM	Minden, Louisiana
KAST	1370 AM	Astoria, Oregon
KASZ	1190 AM	White Hall, Arkansas
KATA	1340 AM	Arcata, California
KATD	990 AM	Pittsburg, California
KATE	1450 AM	Albert Lea, Minnesota
KATH	910 AM	Frisco, Texas
KATK	740 AM	Carlsbad, New Mexico
KATL	770 AM	Miles City, Montana
KATO	1230 AM	Safford, Arizona
KATQ	1070 AM	Plentywood, Montana
KATZ	1600 AM	St. Louis, Missouri
KAUS	1480 AM	Austin, Minnesota
KAVL	610 AM	Lancaster, California
KAVP	1450 AM	Colona, Colorado
KAWL	1370 AM	York, Nebraska
KAWW	1370 AM	Heber Springs, Arkansas
KAYL	990 AM	Storm Lake, Iowa
KAYS	1400 AM	Hays, Kansas
KAZA	1290 AM	Gilroy, California
KAZG	1440 AM	Scottsdale, Arizona
KAZM	780 AM	Sedona, Arizona
KAZN	1300 AM	Pasadena, California
KAZZ	1400 AM	Parowan, Utah

== KB-- ==
Callsign	Frequency	City of license
KBAM	1400 AM	Longview, Washington
KBAR	1230 AM	Burley, Idaho
KBBI	890 AM	Homer, Alaska
KBBO	1390 AM	Yakima, Washington
KBBR	1340 AM	North Bend, Oregon
KBBS	1450 AM	Buffalo, Wyoming
KBBW	1010 AM	Waco–Marlin, Texas
KBCH	1400 AM	Lincoln City, Oregon
KBCL	1070 AM	Bossier City, Louisiana
KBCV	1570 AM	Hollister, Missouri
KBDT	1160 AM	Highland Park, Texas
KBEC	1390 AM	Waxahachie, Texas
KBED	1510 AM	Nederland, Texas
KBEL	1240 AM	Idabel, Oklahoma
KBET	790 AM	Winchester, Nevada
KBEW	1560 AM	Blue Earth, Minnesota
KBFI	1450 AM	Bonners Ferry, Idaho
KBFL	1060 AM	Springfield, Missouri
KBFP	800 AM	Bakersfield, California
KBFS	1450 AM	Belle Fourche, South Dakota
KBGG	1700 AM	Des Moines, Iowa
KBGN	1060 AM	Caldwell, Idaho
KBGV	1240 AM	Monte Vista, Colorado
KBHB	810 AM	Sturgis, South Dakota
KBHS	1420 AM	Hot Springs, Arkansas
KBHT	1590 AM	Mexia, Texas
KBIB	1000 AM	Marion, Texas
KBIF	900 AM	Fresno, California
KBIM	910 AM	Roswell, New Mexico
KBIX	1490 AM	Muskogee, Oklahoma
KBIZ	1240 AM	Ottumwa, Iowa
KBJA	1640 AM	Sandy, Utah
KBJD	1650 AM	Denver, Colorado
KBJM	1400 AM	Lemmon, South Dakota
KBJT	1590 AM	Fordyce, Arkansas
KBKB	1360 AM	Fort Madison, Iowa
KBKR	1490 AM	Baker, Oregon
KBKW	1450 AM	Aberdeen, Washington
KBLA	1580 AM	Santa Monica, California
KBLE	1050 AM	Seattle, Washington
KBLF	1490 AM	Red Bluff, California
KBLG	910 AM	Billings, Montana
KBLJ	1400 AM	La Junta, Colorado
KBLU	560 AM	Yuma, Arizona
KBMB	710 AM	Black Canyon City, Arizona
KBME	790 AM	Houston, Texas
KBMO	1290 AM	Benson, Minnesota
KBMR	1130 AM	Bismarck, North Dakota
KBMS	1480 AM	Vancouver, Washington
KBMW	1450 AM	Breckenridge, Minnesota
KBND	1110 AM	Bend, Oregon
KBNN	750 AM	Lebanon, Missouri
KBNO	1280 AM	Denver, Colorado
KBNP	1410 AM	Portland, Oregon
KBNW	1340 AM	Bend, Oregon
KBOA	1540 AM	Kennett, Missouri
KBOB	1170 AM	Davenport, Iowa
KBOI	670 AM	Boise, Idaho
KBOV	1230 AM	Bishop, California
KBOW	550 AM	Butte, Montana
KBOZ	1090 AM	Bozeman, Montana
KBPO	1150 AM	Port Neches, Texas
KBPS	1450 AM	Portland, Oregon
KBRB	1400 AM	Ainsworth, Nebraska
KBRC	1430 AM	Mount Vernon, Washington
KBRD	680 AM	Lacey, Washington
KBRE	1660 AM	Merced, California
KBRF	1250 AM	Fergus Falls, Minnesota
KBRH	1260 AM	Baton Rouge, Louisiana
KBRK	1430 AM	Brookings, South Dakota
KBRL	1300 AM	McCook, Nebraska
KBRN	1500 AM	Boerne, Texas
KBRO	1490 AM	Bremerton, Washington
KBRT	740 AM	Costa Mesa, California
KBRV	800 AM	Soda Springs, Idaho
KBRW	680 AM	Barrow, Alaska
KBRX	1350 AM	O'Neill, Nebraska
KBRZ	1460 AM	Missouri, Texas
KBSN	1470 AM	Moses Lake, Washington
KBST	1490 AM	Big Spring, Texas
KBSZ	1250 AM	Apache Junction, Arizona
KBTA	1340 AM	Batesville, Arkansas
KBTC	1250 AM	Houston, Missouri
KBTM	1230 AM	Jonesboro, Arkansas
KBTN	1420 AM	Neosho, Missouri
KBUF	1030 AM	Holcomb, Kansas
KBUL	970 AM	Billings, Montana
KBUN	1450 AM	Bemidji, Minnesota
KBUP	1240 AM	Olympia, Washington
KBUR	1490 AM	Burlington, Iowa
KBUY	1360 AM	Ruidoso, New Mexico
KBWD	1380 AM	Brownwood, Texas
KBYG	1400 AM	Big Spring, Texas
KBYR	700 AM	Anchorage, Alaska
KBZO	1460 AM	Lubbock, Texas
KBZY	1490 AM	Salem, Oregon
KBZZ	1230 AM	Reno, Nevada

== KC-- ==
Callsign	Frequency	City of license
KCAA	1050 AM	Loma Linda, California
KCAB	980 AM	Dardanelle, Arkansas
KCAL	1410 AM	Redlands, California
KCAM	790 AM	Glennallen, Alaska
KCAP	950 AM	Helena, Montana
KCAT	1340 AM	Pine Bluff, Arkansas
KCAX	1220 AM	Branson, Missouri
KCBC	770 AM	Manteca, California
KCBF	820 AM	Fairbanks, Alaska
KCBI	770 AM	Garland, Texas
KCBL	1340 AM	Fresno, California
KCBQ	1170 AM	San Diego, California
KCBS	740 AM	San Francisco, California
KCCB	1260 AM	Corning, Arkansas
KCCC	930 AM	Carlsbad, New Mexico
KCCE	1340 AM	San Angelo, Texas
KCCR	1240 AM	Pierre, South Dakota
KCCT	1150 AM	Corpus Christi, Texas
KCCV	760 AM	Overland Park, Kansas
KCEE	690 AM	Tucson, Arizona
KCEG	890 AM	Fountain, Colorado
KCEO	1000 AM	Vista, California
KCFC	1490 AM	Boulder, Colorado
KCFI	1250 AM	Cedar Falls, Iowa
KCFJ	570 AM	Alturas, California
KCFM	1250 AM	Florence, Oregon
KCFO	970 AM	Tulsa, Oklahoma
KCGS	960 AM	Marshall, Arkansas
KCHA	1580 AM	Charles City, Iowa
KCHE	1440 AM	Cherokee, Iowa
KCHI	1010 AM	Chillicothe, Missouri
KCHJ	1010 AM	Delano, California
KCHK	1350 AM	New Prague, Minnesota
KCHL	1480 AM	San Antonio, Texas
KCHN	1050 AM	Brookshire, Texas
KCHS	1400 AM	Truth or Consequences, New Mexico
KCHU	770 AM	Valdez, Alaska
KCID	1490 AM	Caldwell, Idaho
KCII	1380 AM	Washington, Iowa
KCIK	740 AM	Kihei, Hawaii
KCIM	1380 AM	Carroll, Iowa
KCIS	630 AM	Edmonds, Washington
KCJB	910 AM	Minot, North Dakota
KCJJ	1630 AM	Iowa City, Iowa
KCKM	1330 AM	Monahans, Texas
KCKN	1020 AM	Roswell, New Mexico
KCKX	1460 AM	Stayton, Oregon
KCLE	1460 AM	Burleson, Texas
KCLF	1500 AM	New Roads, Louisiana
KCLI	1320 AM	Clinton, Oklahoma
KCLK	1430 AM	Asotin, Washington
KCLN	1390 AM	Clinton, Iowa
KCLU	1340 AM	Santa Barbara, California
KCLV	1240 AM	Clovis, New Mexico
KCLW	900 AM	Hamilton, Texas
KCLX	1450 AM	Colfax, Washington
KCMC	740 AM	Texarkana, Texas
KCMO	710 AM	Kansas City, Missouri
KCMY	1300 AM	Carson City, Nevada
KCNI	1280 AM	Broken Bow, Nebraska
KCNR	1460 AM	Shasta, California
KCNW	1380 AM	Fairway, Kansas
KCNZ	1650 AM	Cedar Falls, Iowa
KCOB	1280 AM	Newton, Iowa
KCOG	1400 AM	Centerville, Iowa
KCOH	1230 AM	Houston, Texas
KCOL	600 AM	Wellington, Colorado
KCOM	1550 AM	Comanche, Texas
KCOW	1400 AM	Alliance, Nebraska
KCOX	1350 AM	Jasper, Texas
KCPS	1150 AM	Burlington, Iowa
KCPX	1490 AM	Spanish Valley, Utah
KCQL	1340 AM	Aztec, New Mexico
KCRC	1390 AM	Enid, Oklahoma
KCRN	1120 AM	Limon, Colorado
KCRO	660 AM	Omaha, Nebraska
KCRS	550 AM	Midland, Texas
KCRT	1240 AM	Trinidad, Colorado
KCRV	1370 AM	Caruthersville, Missouri
KCRX	1430 AM	Roswell, New Mexico
KCSF	1300 AM	Colorado Springs, Colorado
KCSJ	590 AM	Pueblo, Colorado
KCSR	610 AM	Chadron, Nebraska
KCTA	1030 AM	Corpus Christi, Texas
KCTE	1510 AM	Independence, Missouri
KCTI	1450 AM	Gonzales, Texas
KCTO	1160 AM	Cleveland, Missouri
KCTX	1510 AM	Childress, Texas
KCTY	1590 AM	Wayne, Nebraska
KCUB	1290 AM	Tucson, Arizona
KCUE	1250 AM	Red Wing, Minnesota
KCUP	1230 AM	Toledo, Oregon
KCUZ	1490 AM	Clifton, Arizona
KCVL	1240 AM	Colville, Washington
KCVR	1570 AM	Lodi, California
KCVV	1240 AM	Sacramento, California
KCWJ	1030 AM	Blue Springs, Missouri
KCWM	1460 AM	Hondo, Texas
KCXL	1140 AM	Liberty, Missouri
KCYK	1400 AM	Yuma, Arizona
KCYL	1450 AM	Lampasas, Texas
KCZZ	1480 AM	Mission, Kansas

== KD-- ==
Callsign	Frequency	City of license
KDAC	1230 AM	Fort Bragg, California
KDAE	1590 AM	Sinton, Texas
KDAK	1600 AM	Carrington, North Dakota
KDAL	610 AM	Duluth, Minnesota
KDAO	1190 AM	Marshalltown, Iowa
KDAV	1590 AM	Lubbock, Texas
KDAZ	700 AM	Albuquerque, New Mexico
KDBM	1490 AM	Dillon, Montana
KDBS	1410 AM	Alexandria, Louisiana
KDCC	1550 AM	Dodge City, Kansas
KDCE	950 AM	Española, New Mexico
KDCO	1340 AM	Denver, Colorado
KDDD	800 AM	Dumas, Texas
KDDR	1220 AM	Oakes, North Dakota
KDEB	1470 AM	Estes Park, Colorado
KDEC	1240 AM	Decorah, Iowa
KDEI	1250 AM	Port Arthur, Texas
KDET	930 AM	Center, Texas
KDEX	1590 AM	Dexter, Missouri
KDFD	760 AM	Thornton, Colorado
KDFN	1500 AM	Doniphan, Missouri
KDFT	540 AM	Ferris, Texas
KDGO	1240 AM	Durango, Colorado
KDHL	920 AM	Faribault, Minnesota
KDHN	1470 AM	Dimmitt, Texas
KDIA	1640 AM	Vallejo, California
KDIL	940 AM	Jerome, Idaho
KDIO	1350 AM	Ortonville, Minnesota
KDIX	1230 AM	Dickinson, North Dakota
KDIZ	1570 AM	Golden Valley, Minnesota
KDJI	1270 AM	Holbrook, Arizona
KDJS	1590 AM	Willmar, Minnesota
KDJW	1010 AM	Amarillo, Texas
KDKA	1020 AM	Pittsburgh, Pennsylvania
KDKT	1410 AM	Beulah, North Dakota
KDLF	1260 AM	Boone, Iowa
KDLG	670 AM	Dillingham, Alaska
KDLM	1340 AM	Detroit Lakes, Minnesota
KDLR	1240 AM	Devils Lake, North Dakota
KDLS	1310 AM	Perry, Iowa
KDMA	1460 AM	Montevideo, Minnesota
KDMO	1490 AM	Carthage, Missouri
KDMR	1190 AM	Kansas City, Missouri
KDMS	1290 AM	El Dorado, Arkansas
KDMT	1690 AM	Arvada, Colorado
KDNF	840 AM	Belen, New Mexico
KDOK	1240 AM	Kilgore, Texas
KDOM	1580 AM	Windom, Minnesota
KDOW	1220 AM	Palo Alto, California
KDQN	1390 AM	De Queen, Arkansas
KDRI	830 AM	Tucson, Arizona
KDRN	1230 AM	Del Rio, Texas
KDRO	1490 AM	Sedalia, Missouri
KDRS	1490 AM	Paragould, Arkansas
KDRY	1100 AM	Alamo Heights, Texas
KDSJ	980 AM	Deadwood, South Dakota
KDSK	1240 AM	Los Ranchos de Albuquerque, New Mexico
KDSN	1530 AM	Denison, Iowa
KDSO	1300 AM	Phoenix, Oregon
KDTD	1340 AM	Kansas City, Kansas
KDTH	1370 AM	Dubuque, Iowa
KDUN	1030 AM	Reedsport, Oregon
KDUS	1060 AM	Tempe, Arizona
KDUZ	1260 AM	Hutchinson, Minnesota
KDWA	1460 AM	Hastings, Minnesota
KDWC	800 AM	Luverne, Minnesota
KDXU	890 AM	St. George, Utah
KDYA	1190 AM	Vallejo, California
KDYK	1020 AM	Union Gap, Washington
KDYL	1060 AM	South Salt Lake, Utah
KDYM	1230 AM	Sunnyside, Washington
KDZA	1230 AM	Pueblo, Colorado
KDZR	860 AM	Troutdale, Oregon

== KE-- ==
Callsign	Frequency	City of license
KEAR	610 AM	San Francisco, California
KEBC	1560 AM	Del City, Oklahoma
KEBE	1400 AM	Jacksonville, Texas
KECR	910 AM	El Cajon, California
KEDA	1540 AM	San Antonio, Texas
KEDO	1270 AM	Longview, Washington
KEED	1450 AM	Eugene, Oregon
KEEL	710 AM	Shreveport, Louisiana
KEES	1430 AM	Gladewater, Texas
KEIB	1150 AM	Los Angeles
KEII	690 AM	Blackfoot, Idaho
KEIN	1310 AM	Great Falls, Montana
KEJB	1480 AM	Eureka, California
KEJL	1110 AM	Humble City, New Mexico
KEJO	1240 AM	Corvallis, Oregon
KEJY	790 AM	Eureka, California
KELA	1470 AM	Centralia–Chehalis, Washington
KELD	1400 AM	El Dorado, Arkansas
KELE	1360 AM	Mountain Grove, Missouri
KELG	1440 AM	Manor, Texas
KELK	1240 AM	Elko, Nevada
KELO	1320 AM	Sioux Falls, South Dakota
KELP	1590 AM	El Paso, Texas
KELY	1230 AM	Ely, Nevada
KEMR	1090 AM	Milan, New Mexico
KENA	1450 AM	Mena, Arkansas
KENI	650 AM	Anchorage, Alaska
KENN	1390 AM	Farmington, New Mexico
KENO	1460 AM	Las Vegas, Nevada
KENT	1540 AM	Enterprise, Nevada
KEPN	1600 AM	Lakewood, Colorado
KERI	1410 AM	Bakersfield, California
KERN	1180 AM	Wasco–Greenacres, California
KERR	750 AM	Polson, Montana
KERV	1230 AM	Kerrville, Texas
KESJ	1550 AM	St. Joseph, Missouri
KESP	970 AM	Modesto, California
KEST	1450 AM	San Francisco, California
KETU	1120 AM	Catoosa, Oklahoma
KETX	1440 AM	Livingston, Texas
KEUN	1490 AM	Eunice, Louisiana
KEWE	1240 AM	Kahului, Hawaii
KEX	1190 AM	Portland, Oregon
KEXB	1440 AM	University Park, Texas
KEXO	1230 AM	Grand Junction, Colorado
KEXS	1090 AM	Excelsior Springs, Missouri
KEYE	1400 AM	Perryton, Texas
KEYG	1490 AM	Grand Coulee, Washington
KEYH	850 AM	Houston, Texas
KEYL	1400 AM	Long Prairie, Minnesota
KEYQ	980 AM	Fresno, California
KEYS	1440 AM	Corpus Christi, Texas
KEYY	1450 AM	Provo, Utah
KEYZ	660 AM	Williston, North Dakota
KEZJ	1450 AM	Twin Falls, Idaho
KEZY	1240 AM	San Bernardino, California

== KF-- ==
Callsign	Frequency	City of license
KFAB	1110 AM	Omaha, Nebraska
KFAL	900 AM	Fulton, Missouri
KFAN	1270 AM	Rochester, Minnesota
KFAR	660 AM	Fairbanks, Alaska
KFAX	1100 AM	San Francisco, California
KFAY	1030 AM	Farmington, Arkansas
KFBC	1240 AM	Cheyenne, Wyoming
KFBK	1530 AM	Sacramento, California
KFBU	1630 AM	Fox Farm, Wyoming
KFBX	970 AM	Fairbanks, Alaska
KFCD	990 AM	Farmersville, Texas
KFCR	1490 AM	Custer, South Dakota
KFCS	1580 AM	Colorado Springs, Colorado
KFEL	970 AM	Pueblo, Colorado
KFEQ	680 AM	St. Joseph, Missouri
KFFA	1360 AM	Helena, Arkansas
KFFK	1390 AM	Rogers, Arkansas
KFFN	1490 AM	Tucson, Arizona
KFGO	790 AM	Fargo, North Dakota
KFH	1240 AM	Wichita, Kansas
KFI	640 AM	Los Angeles
KFIA	710 AM	Carmichael, California
KFIG	1430 AM	Fresno, California
KFIL	1060 AM	Preston, Minnesota
KFIR	720 AM	Sweet Home, Oregon
KFIV	1360 AM	Modesto, California
KFIZ	1450 AM	Fond du Lac, Wisconsin
KFJB	1230 AM	Marshalltown, Iowa
KFJL	1400 AM	Central Point, Oregon
KFJZ	870 AM	Fort Worth, Texas
KFKA	1310 AM	Greeley, Colorado
KFKB	1070 AM	Wichita, Kansas
KFLC	1270 AM	Benbrook, Texas
KFLD	870 AM	Pasco, Washington
KFLG	1000 AM	Bullhead City, Arizona
KFLN	960 AM	Baker, Montana
KFLP	900 AM	Floydada, Texas
KFLS	1450 AM	Klamath Falls, Oregon
KFMO	1240 AM	Flat River, Missouri
KFMZ	1470 AM	Brookfield, Missouri
KFNN	1510 AM	Mesa, Arizona
KFNS	590 AM	Wood River, Illinois
KFNW	1200 AM	West Fargo, North Dakota
KFNX	1100 AM	Cave Creek, Arizona
KFNZ	610 AM	Kansas City, Missouri
KFOG	1250 AM	Little Rock, Arkansas
KFOO	1440 AM	Riverside, California
KFOR	1240 AM	Lincoln, Nebraska
KFOW	1170 AM	Waseca, Minnesota
KFOX	1650 AM	Torrance, California
KFOY	1060 AM	Sparks, Nevada
KFPT	790 AM	Clovis, California
KFPW	1230 AM	Fort Smith, Arkansas
KFQD	750 AM	Anchorage, Alaska
KFRA	1390 AM	Franklin, Louisiana
KFRM	550 AM	Salina, Kansas
KFRN	1280 AM	Long Beach, California
KFRO	1370 AM	Longview, Texas
KFRU	1400 AM	Columbia, Missouri
KFSA	950 AM	Fort Smith, Arkansas
KFSD	1450 AM	Escondido, California
KFSG	1690 AM	Roseville, California
KFSP	1230 AM	Mankato, Minnesota
KFST	860 AM	Fort Stockton, Texas
KFSW	1650 AM	Fort Smith, Arkansas
KFTM	1400 AM	Fort Morgan, Colorado
KFTP	1350 AM	Duncan, Oklahoma
KFUN	1230 AM	Las Vegas, New Mexico
KFUO	850 AM	Clayton, Missouri
KFWB	980 AM	Los Angeles
KFXD	630 AM	Boise, Idaho
KFXN	690 AM	Minneapolis, Minnesota
KFXR	1190 AM	Dallas, Texas
KFXZ	1520 AM	Lafayette, Louisiana
KFYI	550 AM	Phoenix, Arizona
KFYO	790 AM	Lubbock, Texas
KFYR	550 AM	Bismarck, North Dakota

== See also ==
- North American call sign
