= 1500 AM =

AM radio frequency

The following radio stations broadcast on AM frequency 1500 kHz: The Federal Communications Commission categorizes 1500 AM as a U.S. clear-channel frequency. WFED Washington, D.C., and KSTP St. Paul are the dominant Class A stations on 1500 AM.

== Argentina ==
- LT22 in Pehuajo, Buenos Aires (Defunct)
- LRI208 in Lavallol, Buenos Aires
- LT45 in San Javier, Misiones (Defunct?)
- LU1 in Melchor Romero, Buenos Aires
- LT34 in Zarate, Buenos Aires

== Mexico ==
- XEDF-AM in Mexico City
- XEFL-AM in Guanajuato, Guanajuato

== United States ==
Stations in bold are clear-channel stations.

Call sign	City of license	Facility ID	Class	Daytime power (kW)	Nighttime power (kW)	Critical hours power (kW)	Transmitter coordinates
KANI	Wharton, Texas	40487	B	0.5	0.5		29.322778°N 96.058889°W
KBRN	Boerne, Texas	51961	D	0.25			29.812222°N 98.728056°W
KCLF	New Roads, Louisiana	14897	D	0.85	0.018		30.735556°N 91.416111°W
KHKA	Honolulu, Hawaii	31600	B	5	5		21.335°N 157.893611°W
KJIM	Sherman, Texas	65590	D	1			33.691667°N 96.558056°W
KMXO	Merkel, Texas	55244	D	0.25			32.471389°N 100.005278°W
KPGM	Pawhuska, Oklahoma	17779	D	0.5			36.761667°N 96.199444°W
KSJX	San Jose, California	4118	B	10	5		37.357778°N 121.871389°W
**KSTP**	St. Paul, Minnesota	35641	A	50	50		45.025556°N 93.043889°W (daytime); 45.025556°N 93.051667°W (nighttime)
WAKE	Valparaiso, Indiana	53057	D	1	0.025		41.443333°N 87.048333°W
WBRI	Indianapolis, Indiana	54706	D	5			39.870278°N 86.088056°W
WBZI	Xenia, Ohio	69992	D	0.5			39.713333°N 83.913333°W
WDEB	Jamestown, Tennessee	4136	D	1		0.5	36.425278°N 84.942222°W
WDPC	Dallas, Georgia	73871	D	5		3.2	33.944444°N 84.824444°W
**WFED**	Washington, District of Columbia	74120	A	50	50		39.041944°N 77.046389°W
WFIF	Milford, Connecticut	33246	D	5			41.1925°N 73.101389°W
WGHT	Pompton Lakes, New Jersey	40078	D	1			40.980833°N 74.285°W
WKAX	Russellville, Alabama	57623	D	1			34.528333°N 87.711389°W
WKXO	Berea, Kentucky	4810	D	0.25			37.586667°N 84.301111°W
WLQV	Detroit, Michigan	42081	B	50	10		42.231111°N 83.199444°W
WMJL	Marion, Kentucky	31435	D	0.175			37.337778°N 88.0675°W
WMNT	Manati, Puerto Rico	39772	B	1.2	0.29		18.433611°N 66.4775°W
WPJX	Zion, Illinois	49293	D	0.25	0.002		42.455278°N 87.900833°W
WPMB	Vandalia, Illinois	42091	D	0.25	0.002		38.957778°N 89.122778°W
WPOT	Trenton, Tennessee	73032	D	0.25	0.006		35.981111°N 88.925556°W
WPSO	New Port Richey, Florida	685	D	0.25			28.259167°N 82.729167°W
WQCR	Alabaster, Alabama	72131	D	2.3	0.003	1.2	33.2075°N 86.759444°W
WQMS	Quitman, Mississippi	54325	D	1			32.064167°N 88.724167°W
WSMX	Winston-Salem, North Carolina	24682	D	0.14			36.073889°N 80.255278°W
WVSM	Rainsville, Alabama	58943	D	1		1	34.498889°N 85.842778°W
WZZQ	Gaffney, South Carolina	23005	D	1		0.5	35.088333°N 81.644444°W
