= KEXO =

Radio station in Grand Junction, Colorado

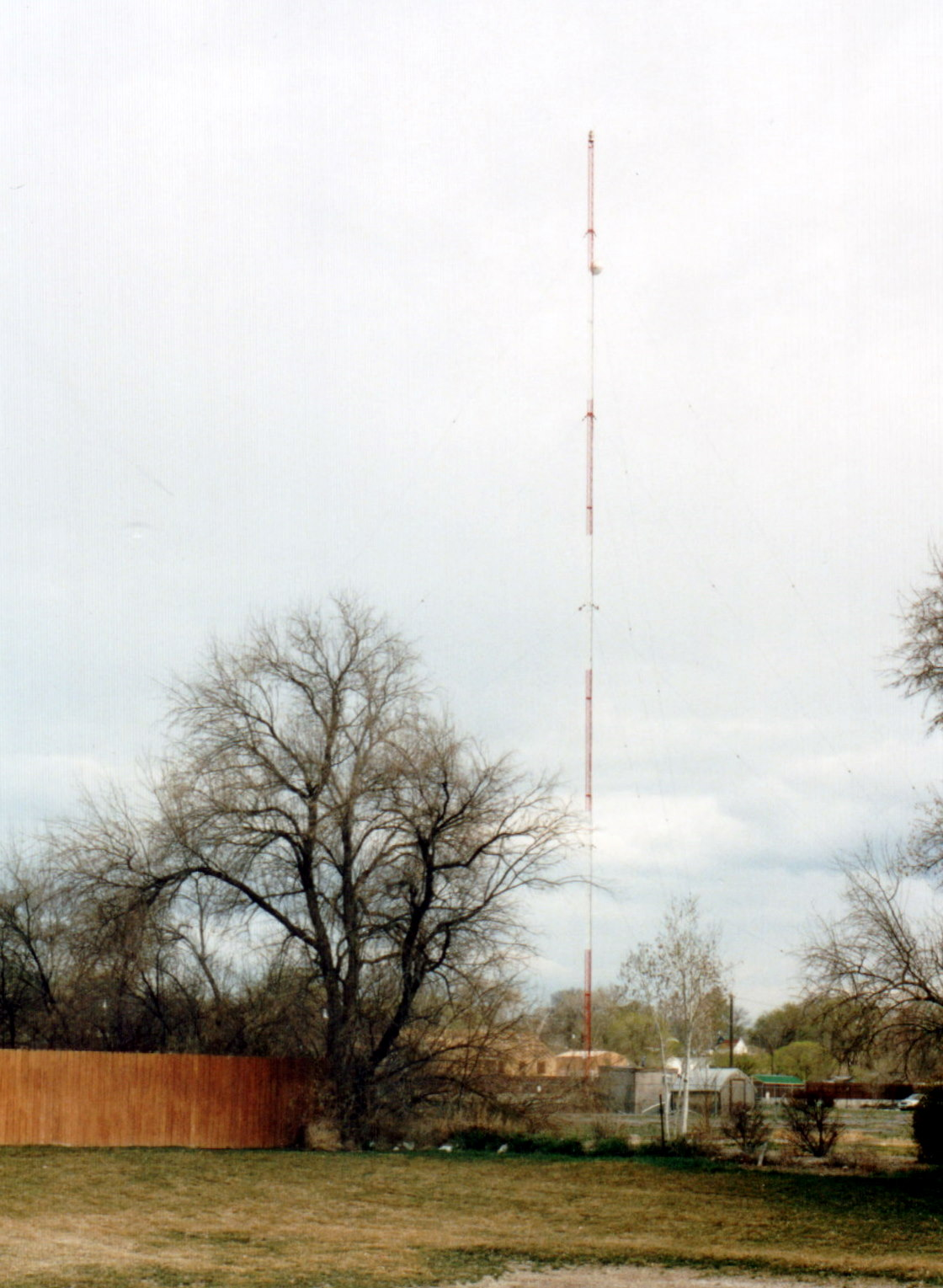
- The radio tower for KEXO, located near downtown.
- Grand Junction, Colorado; United States
- Frequency: 1230 kHz
- Branding: ESPN Western Colorado

Programming
- Format: Sports radio
- Affiliations: ESPN Radio

Ownership
- Owner: Townsquare Media; (Townsquare License, LLC)
- Sister stations: KBKL; KEKB; KKNN; KMXY

History
- First air date: February 29, 1948
- Last air date: August 2025

Technical information
- Licensing authority: FCC
- Facility ID: 47113
- Class: C
- Power: 1,000 watts unlimited
- Transmitter coordinates: 39°5′40.9″N 108°34′43.3″W
- Translator: 96.5 K243CP (Grand Junction)

Links
- Public license information: Public file; LMS
- Webcast: Listen live
- Website: espnwesterncolorado.com

KEXO (1230 AM) was a radio station serving Grand Junction, Colorado, and vicinity with a sports radio format affiliated with ESPN Radio. This station was owned by Townsquare Media. It operated from 1948 to 2025.

== History ==
KEXO began broadcasting February 29, 1948, on 1230 kHz with 250 watts power (full-time). It was licensed to Voice of Western Colorado.

Later, power was raised to 1,000 watts days, but returned to 250 watts at sunset. Studios were located in a downtown storefront, with news wire machines facing the street, and an observation window where pedestrians could watch the DJ at work. KEXO's former studios were located on North 25th Street in Grand Junction from 1948 until 1963. In 1963, KEXO's studios were relocated after the previous studios were demolished by a fire. The station was a Top 40 station for Grand Junction for many years, which then turned to adult contemporary in the mid to late 1970s. "Music & More 1230 KEXO" was its slogan.

Cumulus Media swapped KEXO and its other Grand Junction stations, along with its clusters in Augusta, Bangor, and Presque Isle, Maine; Binghamton, New York; Bismarck, North Dakota; Killeen–Temple and Odessa–Midland; New Bedford, Massachusetts; Sioux Falls, South Dakota; and Tuscaloosa, Alabama, to Townsquare Media in 2012 in exchange for Townsquare's stations in Bloomington and Peoria, Illinois, and $116 million. At the time of the swap, KEXO programmed a talk format.

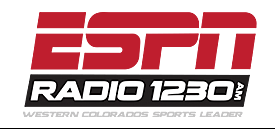
Logo before translator sign on

On January 18, 2021, KEXO began simulcasting on 96.5 FM via translator K243CP. By this point, it was a sports radio station affiliated with ESPN Radio.

Townsquare closed the station in August 2025 for economic reasons. The licenses for KEXO and K243CP were returned for cancellation in July 2026. They were cancelled on August 3, 2026.
