= 1260 AM =

AM radio frequency

The following radio stations broadcast on AM frequency 1260 kHz: There are 55 stations in the United States which broadcast on 1260 AM; the Federal Communications Commission classifies 1260 AM as a regional frequency.

Because 1260 kHz is a multiple of both 9 and 10, the frequency is available for use by broadcast stations in all three ITU regions.

== Argentina ==
- LT14 Gral Urquiza in Paraná, Entre Ríos

== Canada ==
Station in bold is Class A

Call sign	City of license	Daytime power (kW)	Nighttime power (kW)	Transmitter coordinates
CBPM	Sicamous, British Columbia	0.03	0.03	50.8358°N 118.973°W
CBPU	Ucluelet, British Columbia	0.03	0.03	49.0531°N 125.721°W
**CFRN**	Edmonton, Alberta	50	50	53.452306°N 113.681278°W
CKHJ	Fredericton, New Brunswick	10	10	45.997778°N 66.693611°W

== Japan ==
- JOIR in Sendai

== Mexico ==
- XECSAE-AM in Zamora, Michoacan
- XEJAM-AM in Santiago Jamiltepec, Oaxaca
- XEL-AM in Mexico City
- XEMW-AM in San Luis Río Colorado, Sonora
- XEZH-AM in Salamanca, Guanajuato

== Philippines ==
- DZEL in Lucena
- DYDD in Cebu City
- DXRF in Davao City

== United Kingdom ==
- Sabras Radio in Leicestershire

== United States ==
Call sign	City of license	Facility ID	Class	Daytime power (kW)	Nighttime power (kW)	Transmitter coordinates
KBRH	Baton Rouge, Louisiana	18184	D	5	0.127	30.460556°N 91.243611°W
KBSZ	Apache Junction, Arizona	11217	D	4.5	0.05	33.382222°N 111.535833°W
KCCB	Corning, Arkansas	60196	D	1	0.031	36.4°N 90.584722°W
KDLF	Boone, Iowa	6416	D	5	0.033	42.048611°N 93.898333°W
KDUZ	Hutchinson, Minnesota	49124	D	1	0.064	44.906667°N 94.366389°W
KKAR	Beverly Hills, California	43937	B	20	7.5	34.249167°N 118.453889°W
KKOO	Weiser, Idaho	67613	D	8.4	0.036	44.062222°N 116.906111°W
KKSA	San Angelo, Texas	22156	D	0.54	0.071	31.487222°N 100.449167°W
KLDS	Falfurrias, Texas	7149	B	0.5	0.33	27.236389°N 98.172778°W
KLYC	McMinnville, Oregon	6322	B	1	0.85	45.234444°N 123.1325°W
KNBL	Idaho Falls, Idaho	71775	D	5	0.064	43.520833°N 111.9925°W
KPOW	Powell, Wyoming	10337	B	5	1	44.7°N 108.766667°W
KROX	Crookston, Minnesota	24647	B	1	0.5	47.788889°N 96.594444°W
KSFB	San Francisco, California	6369	B	5	1	37.716111°N 122.393889°W
KSML	Diboll, Texas	18106	D	4.5	0.072	31.364722°N 94.718889°W
KTAE	Elgin, Texas	35647	D	1	0.144	30.605°N 97.416944°W
KTRC	Santa Fe, New Mexico	12970	B	5	1	35.682222°N 105.9725°W
KWSH	Wewoka, Oklahoma	65629	B	1	1	35.169444°N 96.541667°W
KWYR	Winner, South Dakota	42112	D	5	0.146	43.3825°N 99.910556°W
WBIX	Boston, Massachusetts	48403	B	5	5	42.274444°N 71.042222°W
WBNR	Beacon, New York	19629	B	1	0.4	41.492222°N 73.978611°W
WCCR	Cleveland, Ohio	17015	B	10	5	41.286111°N 81.642778°W
WCHV	Charlottesville, Virginia	19838	D	0.8		38.114444°N 78.455°W
WDKN	Dickson, Tennessee	18713	D	5	0.018	36.108611°N 87.370556°W
WEKZ	Monroe, Wisconsin	25131	D	1	0.019	42.594444°N 89.592778°W
WFJS	Trenton, New Jersey	53443	B	5.9	2.5	40.265556°N 74.7575°W
WFTW	Fort Walton Beach, Florida	27466	D	2.5	0.131	30.413611°N 86.627778°W
WGVM	Greenville, Mississippi	41838	D	1	0.032	33.422222°N 91.028056°W
WIYD	Palatka, Florida	25862	D	0.4	0.135	29.651944°N 81.592222°W
WKXR	Asheboro, North Carolina	55102	B	5	0.5	35.723889°N 79.805833°W
WLAK	Amery, Wisconsin	47079	B	5	5	45.256944°N 92.366667°W
WLGJ	Philipsburg, Pennsylvania	43879	D	5	0.034	40.894167°N 78.1975°W
WMCH	Church Hill, Tennessee	70735	D	1	0.021	36.520833°N 82.748333°W
WMDG	East Point, Georgia	19541	D	5.1	0.052	33.696389°N 84.474722°W
WNDE	Indianapolis, Indiana	59591	B	5	5	39.865°N 86.061944°W
WNOO	Chattanooga, Tennessee	53955	D	5	0.025	35.052222°N 85.272778°W
WNXT	Portsmouth, Ohio	62328	D	0.25		38.810556°N 82.989167°W
WOCO	Oconto, Wisconsin	36466	D	1	0.029	44.891944°N 87.955°W
WPJF	Greenville, South Carolina	73297	D	5	0.015	34.908333°N 82.344722°W
WPNW	Zeeland, Michigan	36532	B	10	1	42.732222°N 86.101667°W
WQOF	Washington, District of Columbia	8681	B	35	5	38.999722°N 77.0575°W
WRIE	Erie, Pennsylvania	32982	B	5	5	42.055°N 80.04°W
WSDZ	Belleville, Illinois	4622	B	20	5	38.458611°N 89.961389°W
WSHU	Westport, Connecticut	43126	D	0.688	0.072	41.128889°N 73.388889°W
WSKO	Syracuse, New York	50515	B	5	5	43.025556°N 76.065278°W
WSUA	Miami, Florida	55403	B	50	20	25.772778°N 80.421111°W
WUFE	Baxley, Georgia	73	D	5		31.799167°N 82.411944°W
WVOZ	Ponce, Puerto Rico	61147	B	2.3	2.3	17.989444°N 66.619722°W
WWIS	Black River Falls, Wisconsin	74188	D	0.58		44.319722°N 90.891944°W
WWVT	Christiansburg, Virginia	48622	D	5	0.025	37.153611°N 80.507222°W
WYDE	Birmingham, Alabama	34822	D	5	0.041	33.524722°N 86.786111°W
WZBO	Edenton, North Carolina	36765	D	1	0.034	36.083333°N 76.6°W

== Venezuela ==
- YVRM at Caracas
