= KLAY =

Radio station in Lakewood–Tacoma, Washington

- Lakewood, Washington; United States
- Broadcast area: Tacoma and South Sound area
- Frequency: 1180 kHz
- Branding: Sacred Heart Radio

Programming
- Format: Catholic radio
- Affiliations: Sacred Heart Radio

Ownership
- Owner: Sacred Heart Radio, Inc.
- Sister stations: KBLE / KBUP / KTTO / KYTR / KBKW / KBKO

History
- First air date: October 2, 1978
- Former call signs: KQLA (1978–1980); KLAY (1980–1990); KDFL (May–June 1990)
- Call sign meaning: Clay Frank Huntington, original station owner

Technical information
- Licensing authority: FCC
- Facility ID: 11890
- Class: B
- Power: 5,000 watts day; 1,000 watts night
- Transmitter coordinates: 47°9′0″N 122°24′38″W
- Translator: (107.3 MHz) K297CA (Lakewood)

Links
- Public license information: Public file; LMS
- Website: sacredheartradio.org

KLAY (1180 AM) is a Catholic radio station licensed to Lakewood, Washington, United States, serving the Tacoma area. The station is owned by Sacred Heart Radio, a Catholic radio network based in Seattle.

== History ==
Clay Frank Huntington, a commissioner of Pierce County, filed an application with the Federal Communications Commission (FCC) on September 18, 1972, seeking to build a new 1,000-watt daytime radio station on 1480 kHz and requesting the deleted facilities of KOOD, a station that had previously operated on the frequency but folded in 1969. Huntington, who had acquired the former station's assets, competed with Dale Owens of San Francisco for the application, which went to comparative hearing. FCC administrative law judge Frederick W. Denniston ruled in Huntington's favor on April 23, 1976.

KQLA went on the air with an "adult easy listening" format on October 2, 1978. The next year, Huntington agreed to sell the other station he owned, Tacoma's KLAY-FM, and move the KLAY call letters to the former KQLA.

Huntington obtained authorization to move KLAY to 1180 kHz in 1989 and sold the 1480 license to do so. In April 1991, KLAY returned to the air and began a talk format with South Sound–oriented features including Tacoma Tigers baseball and syndicated programs such as The Rush Limbaugh Show. Huntington hoped the station would be more successful at its new dial position. In 1997, the station was authorized to increase its daytime power to 5,000 watts. Into his 70s, Huntington continued working, in part to cope with the 1996 death of his son Mark.

== Sacred Heart Radio ==
Clay Huntington died in 2011. In 2018, Clay Huntington Legacy LLC sold the KLAY facility and a construction permit for FM translator K293CA to Seattle-based Sacred Heart Radio. Sacred Heart completed construction of the FM translator in 2020.
