= KTIA =

KTIA may refer to:

- KVDI, a radio station (99.3 FM) licensed to serve Huxley, Iowa, United States, which held the call sign KTIA-FM from 2010 to 2021
- KDLF, a radio station (1260 AM) licensed to serve Boone, Iowa, which held the call sign KTIA from 2010 to 2011
