= KFFF =

KFFF may refer to:

- KFFF (FM), a radio station (93.3 FM) licensed to serve Bennington, Nebraska, United States
- KVDI, a radio station (99.3 FM) licensed to serve Boone, Iowa, United States, which held the call sign KFFF-FM from 2005 to 2010
- KDLF, a radio station (1260 AM) licensed to serve Boone, which held the call sign KFFF from 2005 to 2010
