= 1100 AM =

AM radio frequency

The following radio stations broadcast on AM frequency 1100 kHz: 1100 AM is a United States clear-channel frequency. WTAM in Cleveland, Ohio, is the dominant Class A station on 1100 AM.

== Argentina ==
- Estilo in Longchamps, Buenos Aires
- Mitre in Corrientes

== Chile ==
- CB110 at Viña del Mar

== Mexico ==
- XEBAC-AM in Bahía Asunción, Baja California Sur
- XEGRM-AM in Ometepec, Guerrero
- XETGO-AM in Guadalupe Victoria, Zacatecas

== United States ==
Stations in bold are clear-channel stations.

Call sign	City of license	Facility ID	Class	Daytime power (kW)	Nighttime power (kW)	Critical hours power (kW)	Unlimited power (kW)	Transmitter coordinates
KAFY	Bakersfield, California	36027	B	4.2	0.8			35.45°N 118.946667°W
KDRY	Alamo Heights, Texas	47666	B	11	1			29.557778°N 98.375556°W
KFAX	San Francisco, California	24510	B				50	37.632222°N 122.130278°W
KFNX	Cave Creek, Arizona	9421	B	50	1			33.797778°N 111.991667°W
KJCW	Webb City, Missouri	17128	D	5		2.5		37.106389°N 94.280556°W
KNZZ	Grand Junction, Colorado	39465	B	50	10	36		38.951667°N 108.419444°W
KRKE	Peralta, New Mexico	160574	D	1				34.5125°N 106.4132°W
KWWN	Las Vegas, Nevada	137871	B	22	2			36.2125°N 115.1625°W
WCGA	Woodbine, Georgia	14240	D	10				31.047222°N 81.746389°W
WGPA	Bethlehem, Pennsylvania	67137	D	0.25				40.624167°N 75.355278°W
WHLI	Hempstead, New York	38337	D	10				40.685°N 73.61°W
WISS	Berlin, Wisconsin	34907	D	2.5		1.6		43.948611°N 88.985833°W
WJZA	Hapeville, Georgia	71603	D	5		3.8		33.728611°N 84.322222°W
WSGI	Springfield, Tennessee	20374	D	1				36.516667°N 86.891667°W
**WTAM**	Cleveland, Ohio	59595	A				50	41.280556°N 81.622778°W
WTWN	Wells River, Vermont	53865	D	5		2		44.148611°N 72.067222°W
WZFG	Dilworth, Minnesota	135930	B	50	0.44	5		46.762222°N 96.671944°W (daytime and critical hours); 46.761944°N 96.671667°W (nighttime)
