= KGY =

KGY may refer to:

- KYYO, a radio station (96.9 FM) licensed to McCleary, Washington, whose HD2 subchannel, relayed by translator K237FR in Tumwater, Washington, uses the slogan "Olympia's 95.3 KGY", and which held the call sign KGY-FM from 1992 to 2013
- KBUP, a radio station (1240 AM) licensed to serve Olympia, Washington, which held the call sign KGY from 1922 to 2014
- kGy, kilogray, an SI unit of absorbed radiation
- the IATA airport code for Kingaroy Airport, Queensland, Australia
- US Library of Congress Classification:Class K -- Law for the Turks and Caicos Islands
