= KYOK =

- Conroe, Texas; United States
- Broadcast area: Greater Houston
- Frequency: 1140 kHz
- Branding: KYOK Radio

Programming
- Language: English
- Format: Urban contemporary gospel
- Affiliations: Premiere Networks

Ownership
- Owner: Salt of the Earth Broadcasting
- Sister stations: KANI, KEES, KGLD, KWWJ, KZZB

History
- First air date: June 1, 1984
- Former call signs: KMUV (1984–1988); KPHD (1988–1989); KSSQ (1989–1996); KCHC (1996–1999)

Technical information
- Licensing authority: FCC
- Facility ID: 40484
- Class: D
- Power: 5,000 watts (days only)
- Transmitter coordinates: 30°20′40″N 95°27′32″W
- Repeater: 95.9 K240FC (Huntsville)

Links
- Public license information: Public file; LMS
- Webcast: Listen live
- Website: kyokradio.org

KYOK (1140 AM) is a commercial radio station licensed to Conroe, Texas, United States, and serving Greater Houston during the daytime hours only. Owned by Salt of the Earth Broadcasting, it airs an urban contemporary gospel format, with a transmitter sited off of Bryant Road in Conroe.

== 1140 history ==
The station signed on the air June 1, 1984, as KMUV. The station has always had a highly eastward directional signal that operates during daylight hours only. The directional signal is a result of protection that KYOK must afford the adjacent operating facility 1150 KZNE College Station, which signed on as WTAW in 1922.

KYOK had a construction permit (CP) granted by the Federal Communications Commission (FCC) to move its transmission facilities from Conroe to Katy in an effort to cover more of the Houston Metropolitan area, and introduce night time service to the 1140 facility for the first time. KYOK would have dropped from its current licensed power of 5,000 watts to 800 watts daytime. Initial authorization for KYOK night power was to be 9 watts. The CP was not built out and expired, effectively leaving KYOK in Conroe. A translator for KYOK was purchased by Salt of the Earth at 92.3 FM, licensed as K222CX in Spring, Texas. The city of license was later changed to Houston.

== KYOK history ==
From 1954 to 1999, the KYOK calls were located at 1590.

What was KATL at the time, was sold in 1954 to two Louisiana businessmen, Jules Paglin and Stanley Ray, for their "OK" group of stations targeted at African American listeners. The call sign was changed to KYOK, to reflect the new ownership and alliance. This also brought an end to 1590's relationship with the Liberty Broadcasting System. The urban contemporary gospel format featured on KYOK lasted on and off for over four decades. KYOK also aired an interspersed Urban Contemporary (or Soul) format within the same time frame.

While still at 1590, from 1988 to 1992, KYOK was known as "The New YO! 1590 Raps" playing a hip hop music urban format.

From the Fall of 1992 to the Fall of 1994, KYOK aired an Urban Adult Contemporary format as "AM 1590 The New KHYS, playing the Hits & Dusties", and was simulcast along with KJOJ-FM and KHYS.

From Fall of 1994 to 1996, KYOK played Urban Oldies as "AM 1590 Solid Gold Soul".

In late 1996, KYOK returned to Urban Gospel as "Gospel 1590 KYOK". This lasted until 1999, when the owners sold the 1590 facility to The Walt Disney Company/ABC Radio and switched it to the national network of Radio Disney children's programming. It got new call letters KMIC in July 9, 1999, representing Mickey Mouse. The KYOK call sign and its Gospel format were moved to this facility, in August 1999, owned by Faith Broadcasting, Inc.

Alvin "Brother Al" McCottry was KYOK's first general manager. Alan H. Lee served as the station's first program director and host of a midday talk show, also serving as its first program director. Both "Brother Al" and Alan Lee are often credited as major pioneers of the urban contemporary gospel radio sound. Disc jockeys included: Michael Mosley (mornings), Ed Grice (music director and afternoons), Seneca Gilbert (promotions director and middays), Jeffrey L. Boney a.k.a. "JBoney" (on-air personality and teen talk show host), Corliss A. Rabb (weekends), Adrienne Rowe (weekends), Barry "T" Thomas (Friday Night Praise party), Nzinga Rideaux, Anthony Valery, Eric Taylor and Gene Moore, Jr. Stacy Macardell was the first sales manager with Sheronda Harrell also in sales.

Former logo

The station was bought by Marin Broadcasting in 1992 for $175,000. In the 2010s, it was acquired by Salt of the Earth Broadcasting, which also owns KZZB, KWWJ, and KANI in the Houston market. KYOK has more than two decades as a community based Gospel station.
