= KGLD =

- Tyler, Texas; United States
- Broadcast area: Tyler-Longview area
- Frequency: 1330 kHz
- Branding: Gospel 1330 & 104-9

Programming
- Language: English
- Format: Gospel

Ownership
- Owner: Salt of the Earth Broadcasting
- Sister stations: KWWJ; KANI; KYOK; KZZB

History
- First air date: February 16, 1956
- Former call signs: KDOK (1956–1965, 1990–1993); KZAK (1965–1979); KTYL (1979–1990)
- Call sign meaning: K-Gold (former oldies branding)

Technical information
- Licensing authority: FCC
- Facility ID: 24246
- Class: D
- Power: 1,000 watts (day); 77 watts (night)
- Transmitter coordinates: 32°22′35″N 95°15′55″W
- Translator: See § Translator

Links
- Public license information: Public file; LMS
- Webcast: Listen live
- Website: kgld.org

KGLD (1330 AM) is a commercial radio station licensed to Tyler, Texas, United States, paired with an FM translator, serving the Tyler-Longview market with a Gospel music format. The station is currently owned by Salt of the Earth Broadcasting.

== Translator ==
Broadcast translator for KGLD
Call sign	Frequency	City of license	FID	ERP (W)	HAAT	Class	FCC info	Notes
K285GY	104.9 FM	Tyler, Texas	156351	250	81 m (266 ft)	D	LMS	First air date: February 7, 2017

== History ==
KDOK began broadcasting activities on February 16, 1956 as the original Top 40 station in Tyler, owned by Buford Broadcasting, and co-owned and operated with KLTV television. In 1965, Buford Broadcasting sold 1330 KDOK to the owners of KZAK-FM, who desired an AM outlet for their country and western format. As a result, the Top 40 format was dropped on 1330 after 9 years, as it flipped formats to country music, mostly simulcasting the FM, and obtaining new call letters KZAK in the process.

"K-Zak" featured several East Texas legends such as Hoss Huggins over the 12 years it programmed country music.

The format would continue on the FM until 1979, when the stations became KTYL, featuring a beautiful music format.

On May 18, 1990, 1330 returned to its heritage KDOK call, and also returning to a 1950s and 1960s Oldies format, which featured many of the same hits of the era that KDOK had originally played in its initial Top 40 days.

On August 24, 1993 the call letters were changed to the current KGLD. Standing for "K-GOLD", the station continued to air a "golden oldies" format, featuring hits from the 50s and 60s.

Today, KGLD is a part of the Martin Broadcasting family of Gospel formatted stations across the State of Texas. It is co-owned with stations in San Antonio, Baytown, and Conroe, Texas. KGLD currently airs Gospel programming independently and in conjunction with its sister station, the Salt of the Earth Broadcasting flagship, KWWJ Baytown.
