= KCRX =

KCRX may refer to:

- KCRX-FM, a radio station (102.3 FM) licensed to Seaside, Oregon, United States
- KCRX, ICAO airport code for Roscoe Turner Airport, Corinth Mississippi United States
- KCRX (AM), a defunct radio station (1430 AM) licensed to Roswell, New Mexico, United States
