= 1500 (disambiguation) =

1500 may refer to:

- 1500, a number in the 1000s range
- AD 1500 (MD), a year in the Common Era
- 1500 BC, a year Before the Common Era
- 1500 AM, an AM radio frequency
- 1500 metres, a middle distance running event
- Ram 1500, a model of pickup truck
