= KCPP (AM) =

Coordinates: 32°16′57.5″N 97°24′48.1″W

- Cleburne, Texas; United States
- Broadcast area: Dallas-Fort Worth Metroplex
- Frequency: 1140 kHz
- Branding: Guadalupe Radio Network

Programming
- Format: Catholic Radio

Ownership
- Owner: La Promesa Foundation

History
- First air date: 1947; as KCLE on 1120 kHz
- Former call signs: KCLE (1947–2008); KHFX (2008-2024)

Technical information
- Licensing authority: FCC
- Facility ID: 65313
- Class: B
- Power: 5,000 watts (day); 710 watts (night)

Links
- Public license information: Public file; LMS
- Website: www.grnonline.com

KCPP (1140 kHz) is a non-commercial AM radio station licensed to Cleburne, Texas, and serving the Dallas/Fort Worth Metroplex. It carries a Christian radio Catholic-based format and is owned by the La Promesa Foundation.

By day, KCPP transmits with 5,000 watts. As 1140 kHz is a clear channel frequency reserved for Class A stations XEMR Monterrey, Mexico, and WRVA Richmond, Virginia, KCPP reduces its power at night to 710 watts to avoid interference. It uses a directional antenna at all times. The daytime signal covers the southern section of the Metroplex. The nighttime signal covers a small area mostly south of Fort Worth.

== History ==
As "KCLE" until the end of August 2008, it had aired a country music radio format since 1947, despite some changes. The callsign swap with 1460 took place on September 1.

Sometime in the first half of 2008, it increased daytime power to 5,000 watts to cover the southern half of the Dallas/Fort Worth area as well as Corsicana and Waxahachie, Texas.

In February 2009 the station was operated via a local marketing agreement by RV Ministries Inc. under the name Radio Vida "La Voz del Evangelio", with transmission time of 12 hours. "Radio Vida" also broadcasts on 89.9 FM in Cooper, Texas.

In August 2011, it switched from its former Spanish language programming to become a 24-hour, all-talk affiliate of the Republic Broadcasting Network.

KHFX's Texas sister stations of SIGA Broadcasting included KTMR (1130 AM, Converse), KLVL (1480 AM, Pasadena), KGBC (1540 AM, Galveston), KAML (990 AM, Kenedy-Karnes City), and KFJZ (870 AM, Fort Worth). KCPP is now co-owned with stations KIXL in Austin, KRDY in San Antonio, KSHJ in Houston, and KEES in Tyler-Longview.
