= KEKB =

KEKB may refer to:

- KEKB (accelerator)
- KEKB (FM), a radio station (99.9 FM) licensed to Fruita, Colorado, United States
