= KJCW =

KJCW may refer to:

- KJCW (AM), a radio station (1100 AM) licensed to serve Webb City, Missouri, United States
- KJCW (TV), a defunct television station (channel 7) formerly licensed to serve Sheridan, Wyoming, United States
- KSWY-LP, a defunct low-power television station (channel 29) formerly licensed to serve Sheridan, Wyoming, which held the call sign KJCW-LP from 2005 to 2009
