= KPHD =

KPHD may refer to:

- KPHD-LP, a low-power radio station (93.3 FM) licensed to serve Modesto, California, United States
- KZMG, a radio station (102.7 FM) licensed to serve Melba, Idaho, United States, which held the call sign KPHD from 2006 to 2013
- KYOK, a radio station (1140 AM) licensed to serve Conroe, Texas, United States, which held the call sign KPHD from 1988 to 1989
