= KZZB =

Coordinates: 30°08′57″N 94°07′59″W

- Beaumont, Texas; United States
- Broadcast area: Beaumont–Port Arthur
- Frequency: 990 kHz

Programming
- Language: English
- Format: Gospel music

Ownership
- Owner: Martin Broadcasting, Inc.
- Sister stations: KWWJ, KYOK, KGLD, KANI

History
- First air date: July 9, 1947
- Former call signs: KTRM (1947–1980); KALO (1980–1986); KGIC (1986); KYND (1986–1987)

Technical information
- Licensing authority: FCC
- Facility ID: 40485
- Class: B
- Power: 1,000 watts
- Translator: 107.5 K298CB (Beaumont)

Links
- Public license information: Public file; LMS
- Webcast: Listen live
- Website: kzzbradio.org/home

KZZB (990 AM) is a radio station licensed to Beaumont, Texas. The station airs a Gospel music format and is owned by Martin Broadcasting, Inc.

== History ==
KZZB was first licensed as KTRM in Beaumont on July 9, 1947, as a 250-watt daytime-only facility, from a licensed transmission site at 3240 Washington Boulevard, and owned by KTRM, Incorporated. The original studio location for KTRM was the South Coast Life Building at 230 Orleans Street in Beaumont. KTRM was originally programmed as a country music station, which it continued as for several decades. George Gautney was the licensed Engineer for KTRM.

2 years later, in 1949, KTRM would move its transmission site from Washington Blvd. to a new location at Crow Rd. & Odom St., while also taking the daytime-only facility to the current 1 kilowatt full-time operation. In 1970, KTRM would again change its transmission and studio location to 4590 Dowlen Rd.

KTRM was sold to Central Broadcasting Corporation in 1974, and was sold again in 1978 to Security Broadcasting Company of Beaumont, Incorporated.

J.P. Richardson (more commonly known by his stage name The Big Bopper) made his debut at KTRM in 1949 as an announcer before becoming a Top-40 performer. Country music legend George Jones worked there when his career was first starting out.

Martin Broadcasting, the current owner of KZZB, purchased the facility in 1992.

== Translator ==
KZZB's FM translator, K298CB, transmits on 107.5 MHz. It signed on the air on December 4, 2015.

Broadcast translator for KZZB
Call sign	Frequency	City of license	FID	ERP (W)	HAAT	Class	FCC info
K298CB	107.5 FM	Beaumont, Texas	156318	250	145 m (476 ft)	D	LMS
