= KGBC =

- Galveston, Texas; United States
- Broadcast area: Greater Houston
- Frequency: 1540 kHz

Programming
- Format: Stunting; Christmas music

Ownership
- Owner: SIGA Broadcasting, Inc.; (Gabriel Arango)
- Sister stations: KAML; KFJZ; KHFX; KLVL; KTMR

History
- First air date: February 1, 1947
- Call sign meaning: Galveston Broadcasting Company

Technical information
- Licensing authority: FCC
- Facility ID: 26002
- Class: B
- Power: 3,600 watts (day); 2,600 watts (critical hours); 185 watts (night)
- Transmitter coordinates: 29°18′55.9″N 94°48′20.7″W
- Translator: See § Translator

Links
- Public license information: Public file; LMS

KGBC (1540 AM) is a radio station licensed to Galveston, Texas, United States, and serving Greater Houston. Owned by SIGA Broadcasting, KGBC has a Christmas music format. The station first signed on in 1947. It also has an FM translator, K269GS is licensed to serve Houston, broadcasting from a location near Baytown, off of W Baker Road & Texas Highway 330. KGBC first broadcast in 1947.

As of 1989 it is the only radio station in Galveston.

== History ==
The U.S. Federal Communications Commission (FCC) granted a construction permit in August 1946 for a new station to broadcast on 1540 kilohertz and serve the community of Galveston, Texas. The station began broadcasting under program test authority on February 1, 1947, and received its original broadcast license in May 1947. Chosen to represent original owner James W. Bradner's Galveston Broadcasting Company, the "KGBC" call sign was assigned by the FCC. The station has served the Galveston area since 1947. At its launch, the station broadcast with 1,000 watts of power and only during daylight hours. In 1950, the station added nighttime service, but in a directional array and at just 250 watts. The station powers down at night to protect clear-channel station KXEL in Waterloo, Iowa, from skywave interference.

After 17 years of continuous operation by Galveston Broadcasting Company, KGBC was sold to Harbor Broadcasting Company, Inc., effective December 20, 1964. On February 11, 1968, KGBC's new owners launched an FM sister station, KGBC-FM (106.1. In 1974, the FM station was sold, moved to 106.5 FM, and re-licensed as KUFO. With shifting ownership and declining fortunes, the station became KXKX in 1979 and KQQK in 1986 before signing off and having its license cancelled by the FCC in March 1989. As of December 2011, the 106.5 frequency is occupied by an unrelated Spanish adult hits station, KOVE-FM.

On February 20, 2002, Prets/Blum Media Company, Inc., contracted to sell KGBC to SIGA Broadcasting Corporation. The sale was approved by the FCC on April 25, 2002, and the transaction was completed on May 9, 2002.

On September 13, 2008, Hurricane Ike made landfall on the upper Texas coast causing flooding and widespread damage. The KGBC broadcast facilities suffered both flooding and damage, knocking the station off the air and keeping it dark for several weeks. The station resumed broadcasting (albeit with low power) on October 6, 2008, and returned to full power operation on February 3, 2009. After spending all of 2009 as a "live and local" broadcaster, the station began leasing all of its airtime, starting January 1, 2010.

In May 2016, KGBC flipped to a business news format with programming provided by the BizTalkRadio network.

In October 2017, 1540 imaging was changed to "KGBC Radio" omitting mention of either the AM or FM dial position altogether. In February 2018, KGBC began simulcasting KLVL fulltime in order to expand the Synergy Radio Network onto the Island and surrounding coastal communities. This proved to be short lived as Siga leased out KGBC and K269GS in April, which both began to air Tejano, branded as Puro Tejano 101.7 FM & 1540 AM.

In July 2024, KGBC began airing Spanish CHR, becoming the main signal for K287BQ 105.3 in Houston, Texas.

In February 2025, KGBC flipped to a simulcast of KSEV 700 in Tomball, Texas, which airs brokered conservative talk. The KSEV simulcast ended in September 2026; the station then began playing entirely Dolly Parton music while seeking a new operator. In November 2026, the station switched to Christmas music.

KGBC's Texas sister stations with SIGA Broadcasting include KTMR (1130 AM, Converse), KLVL (1480 AM, Pasadena), KAML (990 AM, Kenedy-Karnes City), KHFX (1140 AM, Cleburne), and KFJZ (870 AM, Fort Worth).

== Programming ==
In the early 2000s, the station carried a Catholic radio format. It later shifted to non-English programming until being forced off the air by Hurricane Ike in September 2008. The station resumed full-power broadcasting in February 2009 with a mix of local talk radio and classic hits.

Broadcast translator for KGBC
Call sign	Frequency	City of license	FID	ERP (W)	HAAT	Class	FCC info
K269GS	101.7 FM	Houston, Texas	147268	250	107 m (351 ft)	D	LMS
