= KVDI =

Christian radio station in Huxley–Des Moines, Iowa

- Huxley, Iowa; United States
- Broadcast area: Des Moines metropolitan area
- Frequency: 99.3 MHz

Programming
- Format: Conservative Christian talk and teaching
- Network: VCY America

Ownership
- Owner: VCY America, Inc.

History
- First air date: 1950 as KFGQ-FM in Boone, Iowa
- Former call signs: KFGQ-FM (1950–2005); KFFF-FM (2005–2010); KTIA-FM (2010–2021)
- Call sign meaning: K VCY Des Moines, Iowa

Technical information
- Licensing authority: FCC
- Facility ID: 6417
- Class: A
- ERP: 5,300 watts
- HAAT: 107 m (351 ft)
- Transmitter coordinates: 42°02′55″N 93°53′54″W

Links
- Public license information: Public file; LMS
- Webcast: Listen Live
- Website: KVDI Online

KVDI (99.3 FM) is a commercial radio station licensed to Huxley, Iowa and serving the Des Moines metropolitan area. The station broadcasts a Conservative Christian talk and teaching radio format from the VCY America network.

According to the Antenna Structure Registration database, the tower is 90 m (295 ft) tall with the transmitter antenna mounted at the 87 m (285 ft) level. The calculated Height Above Average Terrain (HAAT) is 107 m (351 ft). The FM antenna array is an FMC-4A manufactured by Harris, located off NW 158th Street in Polk City, Iowa. KVDI broadcasts with an effective radiated power (ERP) of 5,300 watts.

In September 2023, the station was issued a Construction Permit to modify its facilities by increasing power to 50,000 watts and relocating its transmitter to a taller tower on the east side of Des Moines. The move would also change the frequency KVDI broadcasts on from 99.3fm to 99.5fm. The move would raise the height of the transmitter to almost 480 feet. This will give KVDI a much larger and improved coverage area.

== History ==
In 1950, the station signed on as KFGQ-FM in Boone, Iowa. It was the FM counterpart to AM 1260 KFGQ (now KDLF). Both stations were owned by the Boone Biblical College. Because the AM station was a daytimer, required to sign off at sunset, the religious programming could be heard around the clock on KFBQ-FM. The transmitter and broadcast tower were originally located in southwest Boone, Iowa on West Park Avenue.

The call sign switched to KFFF-FM on February 1, 2005. The call letters switched again in 2010 to KTIA-FM.

Truth Broadcasting applied to move KTIA-FM's transmitter from Boone to Huxley and also change the city of license to Huxley. This move would represent a 15-mile relocation to the southeast and provide a better signal to the Des Moines area, thus adding 400,000 people into KTIA-FM's listening range. Truth had opposition from Saga Communications, which owns several Des Moines radio stations. Saga said the move would put KTIA-FM in the Des Moines and Ames media markets.

That resulted in the Federal Communications Commission (FCC) in serving Truth Broadcasting with a Deficiency Letter that gave the owners the opportunity to rebut Saga's assertion. Truth Broadcasting countered with its own petition asking that the Deficiency Letter be reviewed and reversed because the move could not hit the Des Moines market without being over 50% of the metro, while the Commission noted that at one site with a directional pattern, the signal could get into over 50% of the Ames area. As a result of this, the FCC denied Truth's request and Petition for reconsideration, thus canceling the application. After reconsidering the decision, the FCC reversed its previous ruling and granted the construction permit for KTIA-FM moving to Huxley. The station was issued its license to cover Huxley on July 6, 2015.

The move of the studios, transmitter and other broadcast oriented items was accomplished in May/June 2015.

In 2021, it was announced the station would be sold to VCY America for $825,000. On November 15, 2021, the sale to VCY America was consummated, with the change to the KVDI call sign on December 17, 2021.
