= KYYO =

Radio station in McCleary–Olympia, Washington

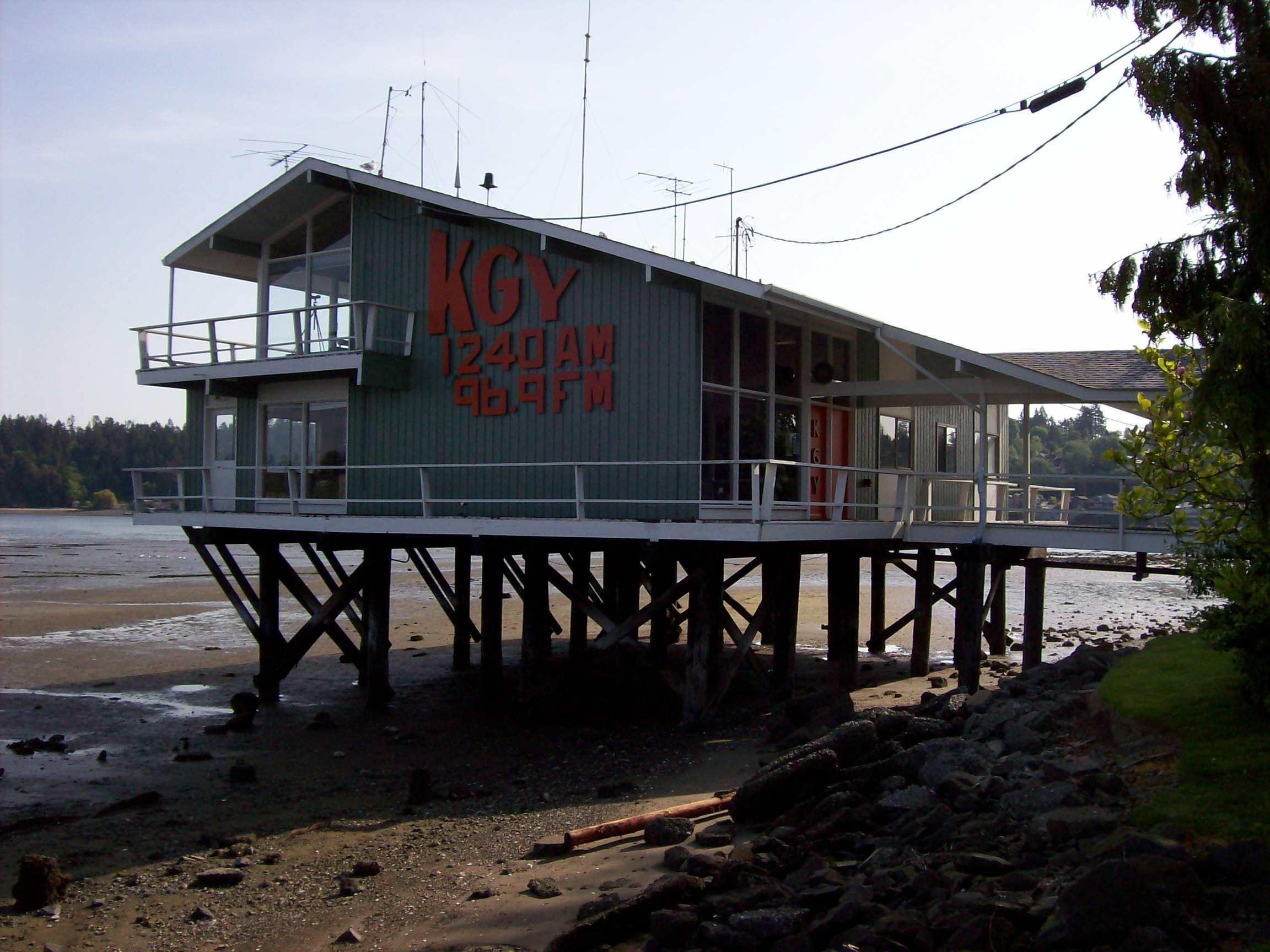
- KGY/KYYO studios over Budd Inlet in Olympia
- McCleary, Washington; United States
- Broadcast area: Olympia and Tacoma, Washington
- Frequency: 96.9 MHz (HD Radio)
- Branding: 96.9 KAYO Country

Programming
- Format: Country
- Subchannels: HD2: Classic hits "95.3 KGY"; HD3: Classic country "KAYO Legends"
- Affiliations: Compass Media Networks

Ownership
- Owner: KGY, Inc.

History
- First air date: March 29, 1992 (as KGY-FM)
- Former call signs: KGY-FM (1992–2013)
- Call sign meaning: "KAYO"

Technical information
- Licensing authority: FCC
- Facility ID: 34485
- Class: C2
- ERP: 11,000 watts
- HAAT: 321 meters (1,053 ft)
- Transmitter coordinates: 47°5′8″N 123°11′19″W
- Translator: HD2: 95.3 K237FR (Tumwater)

Links
- Public license information: Public file; LMS
- Webcast: Listen live; HD2: Listen live; HD3: Listen live
- Website: www.kayofm.com; HD2: www.kgyfm.com

KYYO (96.9 FM), known as "South Sound Country 96.9 KAYO" is an American radio station broadcasting a country music format in the Olympia/Tacoma area. Licensed to McCleary, Washington, the station is owned by KGY Inc, and broadcasts at 96.9 MHz with an effective radiated power of 11,000 watts. Its transmitter is located near McCleary, Washington on Maxwell Hill, and operates from its studios at the Port of Olympia.

Digital subchannel HD3 broadcasts classic country under the brand name "KAYO Legends", while subchannel HD2 broadcasts classic hits under the brand name "Olympia's 95.3 KGY". The latter is simulcast on translator station K237FR in Tumwater on 95.3 FM.

== History ==
This station signed on the air on March 29, 1992, as KGY-FM, a classic rock station co-owned with KGY (1240 AM). A format change in 1997 featured a shift to the Real Country satellite classic country network, originally one of the Satellite Music Network stations, with local information and sports, and Washington State Cougars football.

On February 25, 2012, the station changed its format to country, branded as "96.9 KAYO Country", taking the old format and branding of KDDS. It had previously been "96.9 The Sound" with "Cool Classics and Hot Hits". On November 19, 2013, the station took its current KYYO call sign.

== Translators ==
Until 2014, translator K237FR, on 95.3 FM in Tumwater, relayed AM station KGY in Olympia, which was sold and became KBUP. Although at this point no radio stations had been assigned the "KGY" call sign, KYYO-HD2 programming adopted the slogan "Olympia's KGY 95.3".

Broadcast translator for KYYO-HD2
Call sign	Frequency	City of license	FID	ERP (W)	HAAT	Class	FCC info	Notes
K237FR	95.3 FM	Tumwater, Washington	140747	220	90 m (295 ft)	D	LMS	

== K237FR ==
K237FR
Translator of KYYO-HD2
- Tumwater, Washington; United States
- Broadcast area: Olympia, Washington
- Frequency: 95.3 MHz
- Branding: Olympia's 95.3 KGY

Programming
- Format: Classic hits

Ownership
- Owner: Gregory and Carol Smith; (SeaSound Broadcasting, LLC)

History
- First air date: 2014
- Call sign meaning: "K" means the station is located west of the Mississippi River. "237" is the channel number corresponding to 95.3. "FR" is sequentially assigned.

Technical information
- Licensing authority: FCC
- Facility ID: 140747
- Class: D
- ERP: 220 watts
- HAAT: 90 m (295 ft)

Links
- Public license information: Public file; LMS
- Webcast: Listen live
- Website: www.kgyfm.com

K237FR ("Olympia's 95.3 KGY") is a translator radio station licensed to Tumwater, Washington, which serves the Olympia region. It broadcasts with 220 watts at 95.3 FM, relaying the classic hits programming carried over the HD2 subchannel of KYYO in McCleary.

K237FR is a Class D translator, and was first licensed in 2014. It was initially used to provide an FM signal for KGY (1240 AM) in Olympia, Washington. KYYO concurrently changed its own call sign from KGY-FM in order to avoid confusion. Initially KGY's programming was retransmitted by KYYO-HD2, which was in turn retransmitted by K237FR.

Later in 2014, the original KGY on 1240 AM was sold to Sacred Heart Radio, which changed the station's call letters to KBUP. At this point there were no longer any stations officially assigned the KGY call letters by the Federal Communications Commission. However the "classic hits" format that had originated at KGY continued to be broadcast by KYYO-HD2, using the slogan "Olympia's 95.3 KGY", and this programming continued to be retransmitted on K237FR.
