= KMVG =

- Gladstone, Missouri; United States
- Broadcast area: Kansas City Metropolitan Area
- Frequency: 890 kHz

Programming
- Format: Roman Catholic religious broadcasting
- Affiliations: EWTN Radio

Ownership
- Owner: Catholic Radio Network, Inc.
- Sister stations: KEXS, KDMR

History
- Former call signs: KGGN (1987–2015)

Technical information
- Licensing authority: FCC
- Facility ID: 41561
- Class: D
- Power: 1,000 watts day
- Transmitter coordinates: 39°03′49″N 94°30′38″W
- Translator: 93.7 K229CY (Overland Park)

Links
- Public license information: Public file; LMS
- Website: KMVG at The Catholic Radio Network

KMVG (890 AM) is a radio station broadcasting a Roman Catholic religious radio format. Licensed to Gladstone, Missouri, KMVG serves the Kansas City metropolitan area. KMVG is one of three AM stations in the Kansas City area owned by the Catholic Radio Network, with the other two serving as sister stations. The two related stations are KEXS (1090 AM) in Excelsior Springs and KDMR (1190 AM) in Kansas City, with all three serving the greater metropolitan area with religious programming. Because AM 890 is a clear-channel frequency reserved for Class A station WLS in Chicago, KMVG broadcasts only during daytime hours, and must sign-off at sunset. It is simulcast on FM translator K229CY at 93.7 MHz in Overland Park. The station is an affiliate of the Coffee & Donuts with John & Mary show.

== History ==
The original construction permit for the station that became KGGN (890 AM) was granted to Mid-America Media, Inc., which owned the station during the mid-to-late 1980s. It aired a Southern Gospel format. The station was eventually sold to the Catholic Radio Network, Inc. in a transaction that was filed with the Federal Communications Commission (FCC) in 2014, leading to the call sign change to KMVG in 2015. Its current format is Roman Catholic religious broadcasting, which the station promotes as providing programming from both local sources and the national EWTN Radio network. The Catholic Radio Network supports its operations, which include KMVG, through on-air pledge drives.
