= KLVL =

Radio station in Pasadena–Houston, Texas

- Pasadena, Texas; United States
- Broadcast area: Greater Houston
- Frequency: 1480 kHz
- Branding: Radio Vision

Programming
- Language: Spanish
- Format: Christian

Ownership
- Owner: SIGA Broadcasting; (Gabriel Arango)
- Sister stations: KAML, KFJZ, KGBC, KHFX, KTMR

History
- First air date: May 5, 1950
- Call sign meaning: Former "La Voz Latina" branding

Technical information
- Licensing authority: FCC
- Facility ID: 56148
- Class: B
- Power: 5,000 watts (day); 500 watts (night)
- Transmitter coordinates: 29°41′2″N 95°11′9″W
- Translator: See § Translator

Links
- Public license information: Public file; LMS
- Webcast: Listen live
- Website: klvl.com

KLVL (1480 AM, "Radio Vision") is a radio station licensed to Pasadena, Texas, United States, and serving much of Greater Houston. Owned by SIGA Broadcasting, it carries a Spanish Christian format. In addition to a standard analog transmission, KLVL is relayed over low-power FM translator K235CS (94.9 FM), licensed to Houston.

KLVL was originally nicknamed "La Voz Latina" or "The Latin Voice" as the original Spanish language facility in Houston.

== History ==
KLVL was founded in 1946 by the family of Felix Hessbrook Morales, an entrepreneur, radio personality, and civic leader. He previously hosted his own radio show at a San Antonio station and was poised to own a radio station, but the FCC soon ruled that radio stations could not sublet time to outside purchasers. Prior to that, Morales applied for an application in 1942, however, due to World War II, it was delayed until 1946 and the permit was not granted until four years later. Within Houston and the Texas Gulf Coast, it was the first Spanish language radio station that provided educational programs, music, and news. KLVL sponsored fundraising and job seeking programs.

KLVL then officially went on the air on May 5, 1950, to celebrate both Cinco de Mayo and his wife, Angeline Vera Morales' birthday. During the first few years of broadcasting, it was a daytimer station, but the permit was eventually extended to authorize a 24/7 broadcasting operation. In 1954, after flooding devastated the Rio Grande Valley, the station started a campaign to obtain clothing and necessity goods for the flood victims.

Felix Morales passed on in 1988, leaving KLVL to his wife Angeline in whole. For the next decade, KLVL would carry on as "The Latin Voice" in honor of Morales' legacy in Houston's Hispanic radio community. KLVL was family owned and operated by the Morales family until 1997 when they sold the station to Gabriel Arango's Siga Broadcasting of Houston, after the death of Angeline Morales.

On September 4, 2017, KLVL dropped South Asian formatted "Hum Tum Radio" and began simulcasting 1520 KYND/KQQB. On September 11, 2017, Synergy Broadcasting discontinued the lease of KYND/KQQB, leaving KLVL to air the programming on its own.

On November 13, 2017, Synergy Broadcasting programming ceased airing across KLVL and an in house Oldies/Motown format was implemented, returning a fulltime Oldies/Classic Hits format to Houston for the first time in several years.

== Translator ==
Broadcast translator for KLVL
| Call sign | Frequency | City of license | FID | ERP (W) | HAAT | Class | Transmitter coordinates | FCC info |
|---|---|---|---|---|---|---|---|---|
| K235CS | 94.9 FM | Houston, Texas | 147229 | 250 | 75 m (246 ft) | D | 29°57′6″N 95°30′8″W | LMS |
