= KTMR =

Radio station in Converse–San Antonio, Texas

Coordinates: 29°19′10″N 97°58′35″W

- Converse, Texas; United States
- Broadcast area: San Antonio, Texas
- Frequency: 1130 kHz
- Branding: La Nuestra

Programming
- Language: Spanish

Ownership
- Owner: Siga Broadcasting Corporation
- Sister stations: KAML, KFJZ, KGBC, KHFX, KLVL

History
- First air date: December 17, 1979
- Former call signs: KWBY (1969–1979); KQTI (1979–1985); KVOJ (1985–1990)

Technical information
- Licensing authority: FCC
- Facility ID: 28191
- Class: D
- Power: 25,000 watts (daytime)
- Translators: 92.5 MHz (K223CT, San Antonio)

Links
- Public license information: Public file; LMS
- Website: 1130am.net

KTMR (1130 AM) is a radio station licensed to Converse, Texas serving nearby San Antonio as a Spanish radio station, airing a variety of talk programs, with regional Mexican music mornings, and Sports programming on weekends. It is currently under ownership of SIGA Broadcasting Corporation.

Because it shares the same frequency as "clear channel" station KWKH in Shreveport, Louisiana; KTMR only broadcasts during the daytime hours.

== History ==
The construction permit for KWBY in Edna, Texas, was issued to Cosmopolitan Broadcasting on July 23, 1969, nearly five years after an application was made, but it would be more than a decade before 1130 was built. The original CP holder, Cosmopolitan Enterprises, went bankrupt in 1977; the station was sold out of bankruptcy to Vic-Jax Broadcasting Corporation, which signed it on in 1979 as KQTI.

Prior to its current programming, KTMR was a religious station, KVOJ, The Voice of Jesus Radio, then business talk, then country (KAML simulcast).

KTMR's Texas sister stations with SIGA Broadcasting include KLVL (1480 AM, Pasadena), KGBC (1540 AM, Galveston), KAML (990 AM, Kenedy-Karnes City), KHFX (1140 AM, Cleburne), and KFJZ (870 AM, Fort Worth).
