= KANI =

- Wharton, Texas; United States
- Broadcast area: Greater Houston
- Frequency: 1500 kHz
- Branding: Great Gospel 1500

Programming
- Format: Gospel

Ownership
- Owner: Martin Broadcasting
- Sister stations: KWWJ, KYOK, KZZB, KEES, KGLD

History
- First air date: September 1, 1978

Technical information
- Licensing authority: FCC
- Facility ID: 40487
- Class: B
- Power: 500 watts
- Transmitter coordinates: 29°19′22″N 96°3′32″W
- Translator: 104.7 K284CS (Beasley)

Links
- Public license information: Public file; LMS

KANI (1500 AM) is a radio station broadcasting a Gospel format. Licensed to Wharton, Texas, United States, it serves the Houston, Texas, area. The station is currently owned by Martin Broadcasting.

== History ==
KANI was first proposed, and a construction permit issued by the Federal Communications Commission in 1975 by Beverly Ann Irish, under the licensee name of Radio Wharton County, Inc. The facility was licensed on September 1, 1978 at its current 500 watts, from a transmission site 1.4 miles east & .4 miles north of Wharton Junior College.

Martin Broadcasting, the current owner of KANI, acquired the facility on September 12, 1990.

Broadcast translator for KANI
| Call sign | Frequency | City of license | FID | ERP (W) | HAAT | Class | Transmitter coordinates | FCC info |
|---|---|---|---|---|---|---|---|---|
| K284CS | 104.7 FM | Beasley, Texas | 156325 | 100 | 83 m (272 ft) | D | 29°27′26″N 95°53′24″W | LMS |
