= WBYZ =

Radio station in Baxley, Georgia, United States

- Baxley, Georgia; United States
- Broadcast area: Waycross, Georgia
- Frequency: 94.5 MHz
- Branding: Z 94.5 Hit Kicking’ Country

Programming
- Format: Country music
- Affiliations: ABC News Radio

Ownership
- Owner: South Georgia Broadcasters, Inc.
- Sister stations: WUFE

History
- Call sign meaning: Baxley Z (Z is a reference to branding)

Technical information
- Licensing authority: FCC
- Facility ID: 61095
- Class: C
- ERP: 100,000 watts
- HAAT: 309.1 meters
- Transmitter coordinates: 31°47′6.00″N 82°26′58.00″W

Links
- Public license information: Public file; LMS
- Webcast: Listen Live
- Website: wbyz94.com

WBYZ is a commercial radio station licensed to Baxley, Georgia and airs a country format.

The stations’ studios are shared with WUFE on Golden Isles Parkway in Baxley, while the transmitter resides on Griffin Road in Baxley.
