= WQMS =

- Quitman, Mississippi; United States
- Frequency: 1500 kHz

Programming
- Language: English
- Format: Sports

Ownership
- Owner: Acme Broadcasting South, Inc.; (Matadors, LLC)

History
- First air date: 1965
- Former call signs: WBFN (1965–2001)
- Call sign meaning: "Quitman, MS"

Technical information
- Licensing authority: FCC
- Facility ID: 54325
- Class: D
- Power: 1,000 watts (daytime only)
- Transmitter coordinates: 32°3′51″N 88°43′27″W
- Translator: 102.7 W274CH (Meridian)

Links
- Public license information: Public file; LMS

WQMS is an AM radio station licensed to Quitman, Mississippi. It operates with 1,000 watts during daytime hours only on 1500 kHz. As of July 12, 2019, the station is dark.

== History ==
WQMS began in 1965 as WBFN. The station changed callsigns to WQMS on November 27, 2001.

== Translator ==
WQMS is relayed on the FM band via translator W274CH, which transmits with 78 watts effective radiated power on 102.7 MHz. W274CH signed on on December 14, 2021.

Broadcast translator for WQMS
Call sign	Frequency	City of license	FID	ERP (W)	HAAT	Class	Transmitter coordinates	FCC info	Notes
W274CH	102.7 FM	Meridian, Mississippi	202539	78	0 m (0 ft)	D	32°19′33.7″N 88°41′12.8″W	LMS	Licensed to Matadors, LLC.
