= KFJZ =

Radio station in Fort Worth, Texas

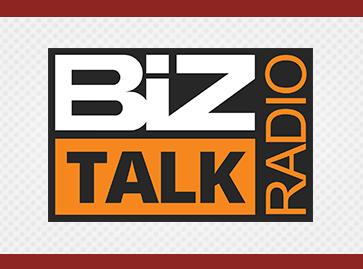

Fort Worth, Texas; United States
- Broadcast area: Dallas–Fort Worth metroplex
- Frequency: 870 kHz
- Branding: Biz Talk Radio

Programming
- Format: Business News/Talk
- Affiliations: BizTalkRadio

Ownership
- Owner: SIGA Broadcasting Corporation
- Sister stations: KAML, KGBC, KHFX, KLVL, KTMR

History
- First air date: December 6, 1946; 78 years ago
- Former call signs: KCNC (1947–1957); KJIM (1957–1984)
- Call sign meaning: Fort Worth Jazz (previous format)

Technical information
- Licensing authority: FCC
- Facility ID: 23138
- Class: D
- Power: 1,000 watts (daytime only)
- Transmitter coordinates: 32°36′3.5″N 97°15′22″W
- Translator(s): 102.5 K273CS (Fort Worth)

Links
- Public license information: Public file; LMS
- Website: biztv.com

KFJZ (870 AM) is a commercial radio station licensed to Fort Worth, Texas, owned and operated by SIGA Broadcasting Corporation. The station serves the Dallas–Fort Worth metroplex with a business news/talk format via the BizTalkRadio network.

KFJZ is a daytimer station, powered at 1,000 watts using a directional antenna. KFJZ must go off the air at night to avoid interference with WWL a clear-channel station on 870 AM in New Orleans.

== History ==
The station signed on the air on December 6, 1946. Its original call sign was KCNC and it was powered at 250 watts, days only.
