= WUFE =

- Baxley, Georgia; United States
- Frequency: 1260 kHz
- Branding: 96.7 The Big WUFE

Programming
- Format: Classic hits
- Affiliations: ABC News Radio

Ownership
- Owner: South Georgia Broadcasters, Inc.
- Sister stations: WBYZ

History
- First air date: 1954

Technical information
- Licensing authority: FCC
- Facility ID: 73
- Class: D
- Power: 5,000 watts (day)
- Transmitter coordinates: 31°47′57.00″N 82°24′43.00″W
- Translator: 96.7 W244CR (Baxley)

Links
- Public license information: Public file; LMS

WUFE (1260 AM) is a commercial radio station licensed to Baxley, Georgia and broadcasting a classic hits format. The station’s studios and transmitter are located on Golden Isles Parkway in Baxley.
