= KKNN =

Radio station in Grand Junction, Colorado

Coordinates: 38.878°N 108.226°W

- Delta, Colorado; United States
- Broadcast area: Grand Junction, Colorado
- Frequency: 95.1 MHz
- Branding: 95 Rock FM

Programming
- Format: Mainstream rock
- Affiliations: Compass Media Networks; United Stations Radio Networks

Ownership
- Owner: Townsquare Media; (Townsquare License, LLC)
- Sister stations: KBKL; KEKB; KMXY

History
- First air date: 1985 (as KLDR-FM)
- Former call signs: KLDR-FM (1984–1988); KKLY (1988–1994)

Technical information
- Licensing authority: FCC
- Facility ID: 47114
- Class: C0
- ERP: 100,000 watts
- HAAT: 434 meters (1,424 ft)

Links
- Public license information: Public file; LMS
- Webcast: Listen live
- Website: 95rockfm.com

KKNN (95.1 FM "95 Rock FM") is a radio station serving Grand Junction, Colorado, and vicinity with a mainstream rock format. This station is under ownership of Townsquare Media.
