= KBKL =

Radio station in Grand Junction, Colorado

Coordinates: 39.066°N 108.748°W

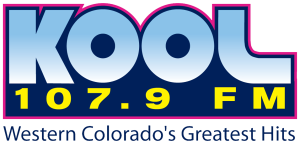
- Grand Junction, Colorado; United States
- Frequency: 107.9 MHz
- Branding: Kool 107.9

Programming
- Format: Classic hits
- Affiliations: Compass Media Networks

Ownership
- Owner: Townsquare Media; (Townsquare License, LLC)
- Sister stations: KEKB; KKNN; KMXY

History
- First air date: 1993
- Former call signs: KJYE (1988–1989); KIOB (1989–1993)
- Call sign meaning: "Be Kool"

Technical information
- Licensing authority: FCC
- Facility ID: 30430
- Class: C
- ERP: 100,000 watts
- HAAT: 453 meters (1,486 ft)

Links
- Public license information: Public file; LMS
- Webcast: Listen live
- Website: kool1079.com

KBKL (107.9 FM branded as "Kool 107.9") is a radio station serving Grand Junction, Colorado, and vicinity with a classic hits format. This station is under the ownership of Townsquare Media.
