= KFNX =

Radio station in Cave Creek, Arizona

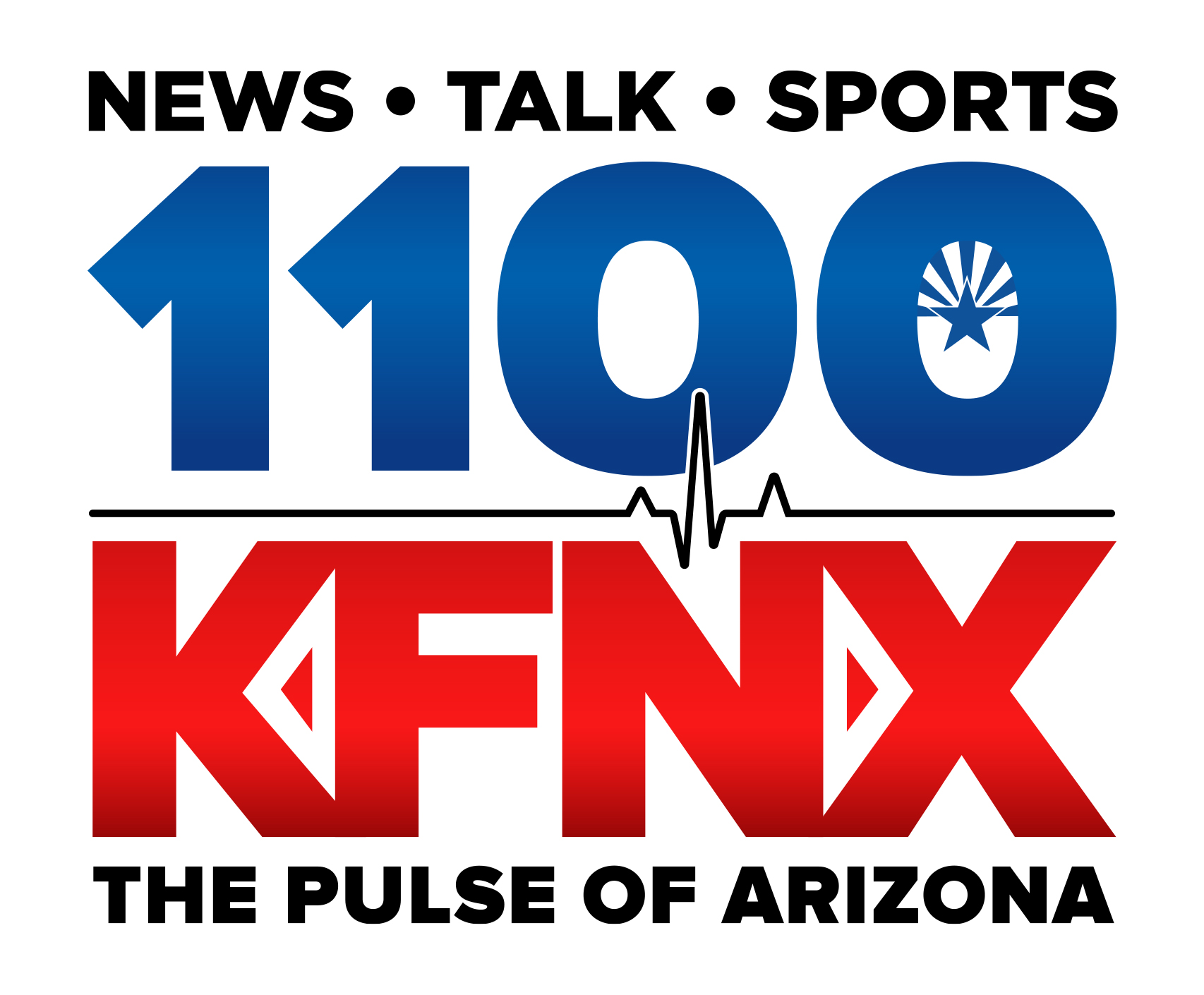
- Cave Creek, Arizona; United States
- Broadcast area: Phoenix metropolitan area
- Frequency: 1100 kHz
- Branding: 1100 KFNX

Programming
- Format: Talk radio
- Affiliations: CBS News Radio; Fox News Radio; NBC News Radio; Compass Media Networks; Premiere Networks; Red Apple Media; Westwood One

Ownership
- Owner: William J. Brady; (Futures and Options, Inc., an Arizona Corporation)

History
- First air date: June 27, 1997; 29 years ago
- Former call signs: KCCF (1997–1998)
- Call sign meaning: For "Phoenix"

Technical information
- Licensing authority: FCC
- Facility ID: 9421
- Class: B
- Power: 50,000 watts day; 1,000 watts night
- Transmitter coordinates: 33°47′52.1″N 111°59′32.5″W

Links
- Public license information: Public file; LMS
- Webcast: Listen live
- Website: 1100kfnx.com

KFNX (1100 AM) is a commercial radio station licensed to Cave Creek, Arizona, and serving the Phoenix metropolitan area. It airs a talk radio format and is owned by Futures and Options, Inc., headed by William J. Brady.

By day, KFNX is powered at 50,000 watts, the maximum for commercial AM stations. As 1100 AM is a clear channel frequency, KFNX reduces power at night to 1,000 watts to avoid interference to other stations. It uses a directional antenna with a three-tower array. The transmitter is on East Carefree Highway in the Desert View Village neighborhood of Phoenix.

== Programming ==
Most programs on KFNX are nationally syndicated. Weekdays begin with America in the Morning followed by Brian Kilmeade and Friends, The Dan Bongino Show, Markley Van Camp & Robbins, The Bill Brady Show, The Erick Erickson Show, The Joe Pags Show, America at Night with Rich Valdés and Our American Stories with Lee Habeeb.

Weekends feature some specialty and brokered programs. Syndicated weekend programs include Armstrong & Getty, The Weekend with Michael Brown, The Takeaway with Major Garrett, The Guy Benson Show, the CBS News Weekend Roundup, CBS Eye on Travel with Peter Greenberg and Jill on Money with Jill Schlesinger. KFNX is also the Phoenix market's broadcaster for University of Arizona Wildcats football and basketball.

KFNX was voted one of the top ten radio stations in Arizona by Ranking Arizona. Most hours begin with an update from CBS News Radio and local news from the KFNX newsroom. It also features traffic reports and local weather forecasts with former KTVK weatherman and former Arizona Lottery drawing host Jim Howl.

== History ==
The station was originally proposed by Peter V. Gureckis of Rockville, Maryland, doing business as Cave Creek Broadcasting Company. A construction permit was awarded to Gureckis by the Federal Communications Commission (FCC) on June 4, 1991. The KCCF call sign was granted on July 12, 1991.

Gureckis enlisted Phoenix broadcast executive Ray Cox to build and sign on the station, with the target format of adult standards. After six years of delays in securing a transmitter site, KCCF signed on June 27, 1997, with a full-service middle of the road format helmed by veteran DJ Bill Heywood instead of the adult standards/big band format Cox originally wanted. Being a new music station on the AM dial was an uphill battle for KCCF, especially when most music formats had shifted to FM by 1997. They did not show up in the Arbitron ratings. Gureckis sold his stake in KCCF in early 1998 to Broadcast Development, LLC (partially owned by Cox), but that ownership would not last long.

On June 8, 1998, Cox sold KCCF for $5.5 million to North American Broadcasting Company, headed by Francis Battaglia, who promptly changed the format to brokered talk as a part-time simulcast of Battaglia's existing station, WALE in Providence, Rhode Island. On August 3, 1998, the station changed to the current call sign, KFNX. In 2004, new general manager Mike Barna reduced the amount of brokered hours and added more local hosts. Barna left the station within a year, and later became owner of classic country station KSWG in Wickenburg. The station shifted back to a format of syndicated and brokered talk.

In 2005, after years of operating in Chapter 11 bankruptcy, Battaglia sold a majority stake in KFNX to Lyle Campbell, reorganizing North American into Premier Radio Stations, LLC (not related to iHeartMedia-owned Premiere Networks). The format was not changed, and Battaglia still ran the station. Campbell filed for personal Chapter 7 bankruptcy, and in 2017, control of the station was reverted to a trustee.

On June 14, 2019, the bankruptcy trustee sold KFNX to Futures and Options, Inc., headed by William Brady of Jupiter, Florida, pending FCC and bankruptcy court approval. Futures and Options closed on its deal on November 5 of the same year. Futures and Options is now the sole owner and operator. Soon afterward, KFNX affiliated with CBS News Radio and began featuring its top-of-the-hour news updates as well as audio rebroadcasts of Face the Nation and 60 Minutes.
