= KEXS (AM) =

- Excelsior Springs, Missouri; United States
- Broadcast area: Kansas City metropolitan area
- Frequency: 1090 kHz

Programming
- Format: Catholic radio

Ownership
- Owner: Catholic Radio Network
- Sister stations: KMVG, KDMR

History
- First air date: August 1968
- Call sign meaning: Excelsior Springs

Technical information
- Licensing authority: FCC
- Facility ID: 14620
- Class: D
- Power: 10,000 watts (day); 4,000 watts (critical hours)
- Transmitter coordinates: 39°17′39″N 94°15′37″W; 39°20′25″N 94°14′26″W (aux)
- Translator: 92.9 K225CI (Kansas City)

Links
- Public license information: Public file; LMS
- Website: kexs.com

KEXS (1090 AM) is a radio station licensed to Excelsior Springs, Missouri, United States, and serving the Kansas City metropolitan area. Owned by the Catholic Radio Network, it airs a Catholic radio format.

KEXS operates during the daytime hours only; programming is simulcast on KMVG (890 AM) and low-power FM translator K225CI at 92.9 MHz. The Catholic Radio Network also owns KDMR (1190 AM) in Kansas City, which airs EWTN Radio Catholic programming.

== History ==
KEXS first signed on the air in August 1968, operating as a daytime-only station, licensed to Excelsior Springs, Missouri. In its early years, the station broadcast at a low power of just 250 watts and served as a local community station for Excelsior Springs, featuring a format of country music and local news. In recent decades, prior to its current format, the station featured Southern Gospel music. The station's current format is Roman Catholic religious broadcasting, which the station promotes as providing "the truth of the Gospel message reflected in Catholic teaching on Sacred Scripture and Apostolic Tradition". To support its operations, the station periodically holds on-air pledge drives. The Catholic Radio Network, which owns KEXS, also operates sister stations KMVG and KDMR, which also serve the greater Kansas City area with religious programming.

== See also ==
- KXJJ
