= KMXY =

Radio station in Grand Junction, Colorado

Coordinates: 39.066°N 108.748°W

- Grand Junction, Colorado; United States
- Frequency: 104.3 MHz
- Branding: Mix 104.3

Programming
- Format: Hot adult contemporary
- Affiliations: Compass Media Networks; Premiere Networks

Ownership
- Owner: Townsquare Media; (Townsquare License, LLC)
- Sister stations: KBKL; KEKB; KKNN

History
- First air date: 1996
- Former call signs: KMKE (1992–1996, CP)
- Call sign meaning: "Mix"

Technical information
- Licensing authority: FCC
- Facility ID: 5550
- Class: C0
- ERP: 100,000 watts
- HAAT: 446.2 meters (1,464 ft)

Links
- Public license information: Public file; LMS
- Webcast: Listen live
- Website: mix1043fm.com

KMXY (104.3 FM) is a radio station broadcasting a hot adult contemporary format. Licensed to serve Grand Junction, Colorado, United States, it serves the Grand Junction area. The station is owned by Townsquare Media, through licensee Townsquare License, LLC.
