= KAML (AM) =

Radio station in Kenedy-Karnes City, Texas

Kenedy–Karnes City, Texas; United States
- Broadcast area: San Antonio, Texas
- Frequency: 990 kHz
- Branding: La Nuestra

Programming
- Language: Spanish
- Format: Contemporary Christian

Ownership
- Owner: SIGA Broadcasting Corp.
- Sister stations: KFJZ, KGBC, KHFX, KLVL, KTMR

History
- First air date: 1974

Technical information
- Licensing authority: FCC
- Facility ID: 17322
- Class: D
- Power: 250 watts (day); 70 watts (night)
- Transmitter coordinates: 28°51′2″N 97°52′48″W
- Translator: 95.3 MHz

Links
- Public license information: Public file; LMS
- Website: Siga Broadcasting Website

KAML (990 AM) is an American radio station broadcasting a Spanish contemporary Christian format. Licensed to Kenedy-Karnes City, Texas, it serves the San Antonio area. KGBC's Texas sister stations with SIGA Broadcasting include KTMR (1130 AM, Converse), KLVL (1480 AM, Pasadena), KGBC (1540 AM, Galveston), KHFX (1140 AM, Cleburne), and KFJZ (870 AM, Fort Worth).

990 AM is a Canadian clear-channel frequency.
