= KDMR =

- Kansas City, Missouri; United States
- Broadcast area: Kansas City metropolitan area
- Frequency: 1190 kHz

Programming
- Format: Roman Catholic religious broadcasting
- Affiliations: EWTN Radio

Ownership
- Owner: Catholic Radio Network; (Catholic Radio Network, Inc.)
- Sister stations: KEXS; KMVG

History
- First air date: September 1, 1971
- Former call signs: KAYQ (1971–1978); KJLA (1978–1992); KFEZ (1992–1997); KPHN (1997–2014)

Technical information
- Licensing authority: FCC
- Facility ID: 4373
- Class: B
- Power: 5,000 watts (day); 500 watts (night)
- Transmitter coordinates: 39°3′49″N 94°30′37″W
- Translators: 95.3 K237GQ (Kansas City, Kansas)

Links
- Public license information: Public file; LMS
- Website: thecatholicradionetwork.com

KDMR (1190 AM) is a radio station licensed to Kansas City, Missouri, serving the Kansas City metropolitan area. The station is owned by the Catholic Radio Network, Inc. It airs a Roman Catholic religious radio format. KDMR airs both local shows and national programming from EWTN Radio.

KDMR operates with 5000 watts by day. Because AM 1190 is a clear-channel frequency reserved for Class A stations KEX in Portland, Oregon, KDMR must reduce power at night to 500 watts to avoid interference. Programming is simulcast on FM translator station K237GQ in Kansas City, Kansas, at 95.3 MHz.

== History ==
On September 1, 1971, the station went on the air as KAYQ. It used the slogan "Fresh Air for Kansas City", and aired a middle of the road and news format, competing with ratings leader KMBZ 980. The format later changed to country music for several years.

On December 20, 1978, the station changed its call sign to KJLA under Owner/general manager Wilton "Chip" Osborn, and played 24-hour disco hits until that music phenomenon faded in 1980. Even the newscasts had a disco beat in the background. In the fall of 1981, KJLA switched to "The Music of Your Life", a syndicated adult standards format, and dropped all local newscasts. Yet several months later, the station received a national Associated Press award for its coverage of the deadly Hyatt Regency walkway collapse.

On October 12, 1992, the station's call sign were changed to KFEZ, to reflect the "easy" sound of the station as a Music of Your Life network affiliate. On March 3, 1997, the format switched to Business News and the call sign were changed again to KPHN. During this time, the station carried the syndicated Imus in the Morning.

On July 19, 2002, at 2 pm, Radio Disney made its debut in Kansas City, with the first song being "Complicated" by Avril Lavigne. In June 2013, Disney put KPHN and six other Radio Disney stations in medium-sized markets up for sale, to refocus the network's broadcast distribution in the top 25 markets.

On July 31, 2013, KPHN dropped the Radio Disney affiliation and went silent. In April, Disney filed to sell KPHN to the Catholic Radio Network (a Missouri non-profit Corporation), owner of KEXS. The sale was consummated on July 25, at a purchase price of $700,000, and accepted by the FCC on July 28. After almost one year, KPHN resumed operations on July 25.

On December 11, 2016, which is the vigil of the feast day for Our Lady of Guadalupe, the patron saint of Mexico, the station switched to a Spanish-language Catholic radio format. It has since returned to English-language Catholic programming, although sometimes different than sister stations 1090 KEXS and 890 KMVG, which also serve Kansas City as Catholic radio stations.
