= WVSM =

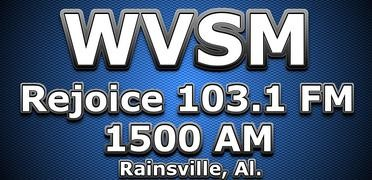
- Rainsville, Alabama; United States
- Broadcast area: Fort Payne, Alabama; Rainsville, Alabama
- Frequency: 1500 kHz
- Branding: Rejoice 103.1 FM

Programming
- Format: Southern Gospel/Contemporary Christian (At Night 103.1 FM)

Ownership
- Owner: Sand Mountain Advertising Co.

History
- First air date: July 20, 1967 (first license granted)
- Call sign meaning: Voice of Sand Mountain

Technical information
- Licensing authority: FCC
- Facility ID: 58943
- Class: D
- Power: 1,000 watts (day); 1,000 watts (critical hours)
- Translator: 103.1 MHz - W276DC

Links
- Public license information: Public file; LMS
- Webcast: http://stream.wvsmfm.com
- Website: https://www.wvsmfm.com/

WVSM (1500 AM and 103.1 FM) is a radio station licensed in Rainsville, Alabama and serves Northeast Alabama...including the following counties: Dekalb, parts of Jackson, Cherokee, and Marshall Counties. The station is owned by Sand Mountain Advertising Co. It airs a Southern Gospel music format during the day and Contemporary Christian and Praise and Worship at night.

The station has been assigned these call letters by the Federal Communications Commission.

Rejoice 103.1 is now on the air and plays Southern Gospel Music during the day and Contemporary Christian Music at night (This info was extracted from their web site.)

== FM Translator ==
In addition to the main station at 1500 kHz, WVSM is relayed by an FM translator in order to widen its broadcast area, especially during nighttime hours when the AM frequency is off the air. The FM frequency is used most prominently in the station branding.

Broadcast translator for WVSM
Call sign	Frequency	City of license	FID	ERP (W)	Class	FCC info
W276DC	103.1 FM	Rainsville, Alabama	145718	250	D	LMS
