= KWYR (AM) =

- Winner, South Dakota; United States
- Frequency: 1260 kHz
- Branding: AM Country 1260

Programming
- Format: Country music
- Affiliations: ABC Radio

Ownership
- Owner: Midwest Radio Corp.

History
- First air date: September 27, 1957

Technical information
- Licensing authority: FCC
- Facility ID: 42112
- Class: D
- Power: 5,000 watts day 146 watts night
- Transmitter coordinates: 43°22′57″N 99°54′38″W
- Translators: K248DI (97.5 MHz, Winner)

Links
- Public license information: Public file; LMS
- Website: kwyr.com

KWYR (1260 AM) is a radio station broadcasting a country music format. Licensed to Winner, South Dakota, United States. The station is currently owned by Midwest Radio Corp. and features programming from ABC Radio.

== History ==
KWYR began broadcasting on September 27, 1957. The station was originally located on the second floor of the Wally Laudenslager building at Second and Polk streets in Winner. The original transmitter and tower were located one mile north of the city. The Federal Communications Commission granted a construction permit for the station on June 6, 1957.

In January 1958, the station was managed by Tom Broderson. During the summer of 1958, the station was sold to a group of local investors from Winner and the Black Hills, led by Al Clark of Rapid City. In 1966, the station filed for facility changes with the FCC, citing the high soil conductivity of central South Dakota as a factor in its signal coverage. The station was purchased by Midwest Radio Corp. in April 1996.
