= KDRY =

Coordinates: 29°33′26″N 98°22′35″W

Alamo Heights, Texas; United States
- Broadcast area: Greater San Antonio
- Frequency: 1100 kHz
- Branding: AM 1100

Programming
- Language: English
- Format: Christian talk and teaching

Ownership
- Owner: KDRY Radio, Inc.

History
- First air date: November 8, 1963
- Call sign meaning: Christian owner advocated Texas becoming a dry state

Technical information
- Licensing authority: FCC
- Facility ID: 47666
- Class: B
- Power: 11,000 watts (day); 1,000 watts (night)

Links
- Public license information: Public file; LMS
- Webcast: Listen Live
- Website: www.kdry.com

KDRY (1100 kHz) is an AM radio station broadcasting a Christian Teaching and Preaching radio format. The station is licensed to Alamo Heights, Texas, and serves Greater San Antonio. The station is family-owned and the license is held by KDRY Radio, Inc.

KDRY airs local and nationally syndicated programs. Among the hosts are Rick Warren, Dr. Charles Stanley and Jim Daly. The studios and offices are on San Pedro Avenue in San Antonio and the transmitter is off Lookout Road, near Interstate 35.

== History ==
KDRY signed on the air on November 6, 1963. The original license was for 1,000 watts, daytime signal only, on frequency AM 1110. Samuel Nathaniel Morris was the driving force to build a radio station that would have a Christian preaching and teaching format. He advocated that Texas should be a "dry state," where no alcohol was sold, which is how the station got its call sign.

In 1982, KDRY was granted a license by the FCC to expand its signal strength to 11,000 watts of power and move to AM 1100. The effect of this was a 75-mile signal strength during the day and 1000 watts covering San Antonio and its close suburbs during night time hours. 1100 kHz is a clear channel frequency reserved for Class A WTAM in Cleveland, so KDRY must reduce power at night to avoid interference. The daytime signal is non-directional but at night, KDRY uses a directional antenna pointed away from Cleveland. For this reason, it is hard to hear KDRY northeast of San Antonio at night, while its daytime signal can be heard as far away as Austin.

KDRY Radio, AM 1100 has been family owned and operated since 1963, and is currently on its third generation of ownership.
