= KBKW =

- Aberdeen, Washington; United States
- Broadcast area: Grays Harbor
- Frequency: 1450 kHz
- Branding: Sacred Heart Radio

Programming
- Format: Catholic radio
- Affiliations: EWTN Radio Network

Ownership
- Owner: Secret Heart Raio, Inc.

History
- First air date: August 1, 1949; 76 years ago
- Former call signs: KBKW (1949–1982); KAYO (1982–1995)
- Call sign meaning: Ben K. Wetherwax (original owner)

Technical information
- Licensing authority: FCC
- Facility ID: 33623
- Class: C
- Power: 1,000 watts
- Transmitter coordinates: 46°56′59″N 123°49′13″W
- Translator: 103.5 K278CU (Aberdeen)

Links
- Public license information: Public file; LMS
- Webcast: Listen Live
- Website: sacredheartradio.org

KBKW (1450 AM) is a radio station licensed to Aberdeen, Washington, and serving the area around Grays Harbor. The station is owned by Sacred Heart Radio, Inc. a non-profit organization. It airs a Catholic radio format, simulcast with flagship station KBLE Seattle.

KBKW is powered at 1,000 watts, using a non-directional antenna. Programming is simulcast on 250-watt FM translator 103.5 MHz K278CU in Aberdeen.

== Programming ==
Programming 24/7 is from Sacred Heart Radio. Some local Washington state shows are heard, with nationally syndicated programs supplied by the EWTN Radio Network.

== History ==
The station originally signed on the air on August 1, 1949. The original call sign was KBKW. The call sign represented the founder's initials, Ben K. Weatherwax. Weatherwax was part of a prominent local family, and was the first full-time radio newsman in Southwest Washington, employed at KXRO until the launch of KBKW.

In later years, the call sign changed to KAYO, with a switch to a country music format. On April 28, 1975, the station reverted to the current call sign KBKW, with the FM sister station retaining the KAYO call sign. The KAYO call sign has since switched to an FM station in Alaska.

On January 18, 2022, KBKW changed its format from news/talk to a simulcast of KSWW's HD3 subchannel's classic country format as "Timber Country 94.7", which is fed on translator K234AU.

Effective October 19, 2022, KBKW and its FM translator were sold to Sacred Heart Radio, a Catholic network in Washington state.
