= WCGA =

- Woodbine, Georgia; United States
- Broadcast area: Brunswick, Georgia
- Frequency: 1100 kHz

Programming
- Format: News/talk
- Affiliations: Fox News Radio, Salem Radio Network

Ownership
- Owner: Cox Broadcast Group, Inc.

History
- First air date: June 15, 1987; 38 years ago (as WGMM)
- Former call signs: WGBE (1986–1987); WGMM (1987–1988)

Technical information
- Licensing authority: FCC
- Facility ID: 14240
- Class: D
- Power: 10,000 watts day
- Transmitter coordinates: 31°2′50.00″N 81°44′47.00″W

Links
- Public license information: Public file; LMS

WCGA (1100 AM) is a radio station broadcasting a news/talk format. Licensed to Woodbine, Georgia, United States, the station serves Brunswick, Georgia, and Fernandina Beach, Florida. The station is owned by Cox Broadcast Group, Inc. (unrelated to the larger Cox Media Group or Cox Enterprises) and features programming from Fox News Radio and Salem Radio Network.

== History ==
The station was assigned the call sign WGBE on June 10, 1986. On March 30, 1987, it changed its call sign to WGMM; it signed on June 15 with religious programming and southern gospel. Original owner Miller Broadcasting, controlled by Joanne S. Mller, sold WGMM to J. Wesley Cox's Cox Broadcast Group for $25,000 in 1988; on November 30, it became WCGA. In 1997, WCGA, following a period in which it was silent, returned to the air with a talk format. On March 17, 2005, the station's license was cancelled because its license had expired without renewal on April 1, 2004; after subsequently filing for renewal, in May 2007 the Federal Communications Commission (FCC) restored the WCGA license and fined Cox Broadcast Group $7,000.

On January 15, 2020, the FCC revoked WCGA's license for failure to pay delinquent regulatory fees owed to the Commission. On February 11, 2020, the FCC rescinded the revocation, as it had not considered Cox Broadcast Group's response to the order.
