= KCCB =

- Corning, Arkansas; United States
- Frequency: 1260 kHz
- Branding: Jazz 1260

Programming
- Format: Jazz

Ownership
- Owner: Shields-Adkins Broadcasting

History
- First air date: 1959

Technical information
- Licensing authority: FCC
- Facility ID: 60196
- Class: D
- Power: 1,000 watts day; 31 watts night
- Transmitter coordinates: 36°24′0″N 90°35′5″W

Links
- Public license information: Public file; LMS

KCCB (1260 AM) is a radio station broadcasting a jazz format. Licensed to Corning, Arkansas, United States, the station is currently owned by Shields-Adkins Broadcasting.
