= KCLF =

- New Roads, Louisiana; United States
- Frequency: 1500 kHz
- Branding: Voice of Pointe Coupee

Programming
- Format: Urban contemporary
- Affiliations: Compass Media Networks

Ownership
- Owner: New World Broadcasting Company

History
- First air date: 1965
- Former call signs: KQXL (1979–1981)

Technical information
- Licensing authority: FCC
- Facility ID: 14897
- Class: D
- Power: 850 watts day 18 watts night
- Transmitter coordinates: 30°44′8″N 91°25′59″W

Links
- Public license information: Public file; LMS
- Webcast: Listen live
- Website: Official website

KCLF (1500 AM) is a radio station broadcasting an urban contemporary format which includes blues, gospel, news, oldies, and zydeco. The station is licensed to New Roads, Louisiana, United States. The station is currently owned by New World Broadcasting Company.

On January 12, 2015, KCLF was granted a Federal Communications Commission construction permit to move to a new transmitter site, decrease day power to 850 watts and add night operation with 18 watts.

== History ==
The station was assigned the call letters KQXL on January 1, 1979. On September 1, 1981, the station changed its call sign to the current KCLF.
