= KCRX (AM) =

Roswell, New Mexico; United States
- Frequency: 1430 kHz

Programming
- Format: Defunct

Ownership
- Owner: Rosendo Casarez, Jr.; (license expired)

History
- First air date: February 16, 1927
- Last air date: October 1, 2013

Technical information
- Facility ID: 57700
- Class: B
- Power: 5,000 watts (day); 1,000 watts (night)
- Transmitter coordinates: 33°26′11″N 104°36′18″W

KCRX (1430 AM) was a radio station broadcasting an oldies format. It was licensed to serve Roswell, New Mexico, United States. The station was owned by Rosendo Casarez, Jr.

== History ==
The station was first licensed to broadcast with 50 watts as KGFL 1350 kHz on February 16, 1927. In 1929 the station moved to 1370 kHz and in 1933 received a power increase to 100 watts. The station was moved to 1400 kHz in 1941 and had a power increase to 250 watts in 1947. 1430 was the new frequency with 5,000 watts daytime and 1000 watts night, with a nighttime directional array at a new transmitter location 5.5 miles northwest of downtown Roswell. The station was silent from February 1967 to October 1968. It was authorized to operate daytime only from late 1969 to October 1970. Operations were suspended from February 1971 to March 20, 1972. The station resumed operation on February 29, 1972. Operations were again suspended for most of the time from May 2, 1974 to September 1, 1976.

The station license expired on October 1, 2013. On November 12, 2013 a renewal form was accepted for filing at the FCC for the expired station license, however, the license had been cancelled the previous month by the Federal Communications Commission.
