= KJCW (AM) =

- Webb City, Missouri; United States
- Broadcast area: Joplin, Missouri
- Frequency: 1100 kHz

Programming
- Format: Christian radio

Ownership
- Owner: Catholic Radio Network, Inc.

History
- First air date: 1984
- Former call signs: KKLL (1984–2024)

Technical information
- Licensing authority: FCC
- Facility ID: 17128
- Class: D
- Power: 5,000 watts day; 2,500 watts critical hours
- Transmitter coordinates: 37°6′23.00″N 94°16′50.00″W
- Translator: 92.1 K221GQ (Webb City)

Links
- Public license information: Public file; LMS

KJCW (1100 AM) is a radio station broadcasting a Christian radio format. It is licensed to Webb City, Missouri, United States, and serves the Joplin area. The station is owned by the Catholic Radio Network, Inc.
