= KBRN =

- Boerne, Texas; United States
- Broadcast area: Boerne and surrounding areas
- Frequency: 1500 kHz
- Branding: KBRN Boerne Radio 103.9 FM and 1500 AM

Programming
- Format: Oldies

Ownership
- Owner: Shan and Baron Wiley; (Bofars Media Group, LLC)

History
- First air date: 1982
- Former call signs: KNCI (1982–1984); KYCS (1984–1985); DKBRN (2018–2019)
- Call sign meaning: BoeRNe

Technical information
- Licensing authority: FCC
- Facility ID: 51961
- Class: D
- Power: 250 watts day
- Transmitter coordinates: 29°48′44″N 98°43′41″W
- Translator: 103.9 K280GR (Boerne)

Links
- Public license information: Public file; LMS
- Webcast: Listen Live
- Website: boerneradio.godaddysites.com

KBRN (1500 AM) is a daytime only radio station licensed to Boerne, Texas, United States. The station is owned by Shan and Baron Wiley, through licensee Bofars Media Group, LLC, and broadcasts a solid gold format.

The station was assigned call sign KNCI on March 22, 1982. On June 15, 1984, the station changed its call sign to KYCS, and on January 1, 1985, it changed to KBRN.

In 1993, KBRN was sold to Paulino Bernal Evangelism. Gerald Benavides acquired it in 2004, selling two years later to Claro Communications, which instituted a Spanish talk format.

In June 2011, an FM repeater (K272EK 102.3 San Antonio) began rebroadcasting the station. In late 2014, the FM and AM went separate ways, and the Spanish talk format ended. In August 2015, KBRN re-launched with Oldies music. On March 1, 2017, KBRN went silent.

On July 28, 2017, the FCC granted approval to modify a construction permit to move an FM translator to a new location in Boerne on 103.9 MHz to relay KBRN. On July 31, 2018, the FCC deemed that the station had been off the air for more than a year and cancelled its license as a result.

On February 1, 2019, the FCC granted the station special temporary authority to continue operating.

On May 22, 2019, the FCC granted approval for KBRN's license to be assigned by Claro Communications to Bonnie Chambers. The assignment was consummated on June 18, 2019, at a purchase price of $100,000. KBRN is also now broadcasting on 103.9 FM with a translator.
