= KEKB (FM) =

Radio station in Grand Junction, Colorado

- Fruita, Colorado; United States
- Broadcast area: Grand Junction, Colorado
- Frequency: 99.9 MHz
- Branding: 99.9 KEKB

Programming
- Format: Country
- Affiliations: Compass Media Networks; Westwood One

Ownership
- Owner: Townsquare Media; (Townsquare License, LLC)
- Sister stations: KBKL; KKNN; KMXY

History
- First air date: May 24, 1984

Technical information
- Licensing authority: FCC
- Facility ID: 30431
- Class: C0
- ERP: 79,000 watts
- HAAT: 471.1 meters (1,546 ft)
- Transmitter coordinates: 39°3′56″N 108°44′52″W

Links
- Public license information: Public file; LMS
- Webcast: Listen live
- Website: kekbfm.com

KEKB (99.9 MHz) is an FM radio station serving Grand Junction, Colorado, and its vicinity with a country music format. This station is under ownership of Townsquare Media, through licensee Townsquare License, LLC. The station began broadcasting May 24, 1984.
