= KBUP =

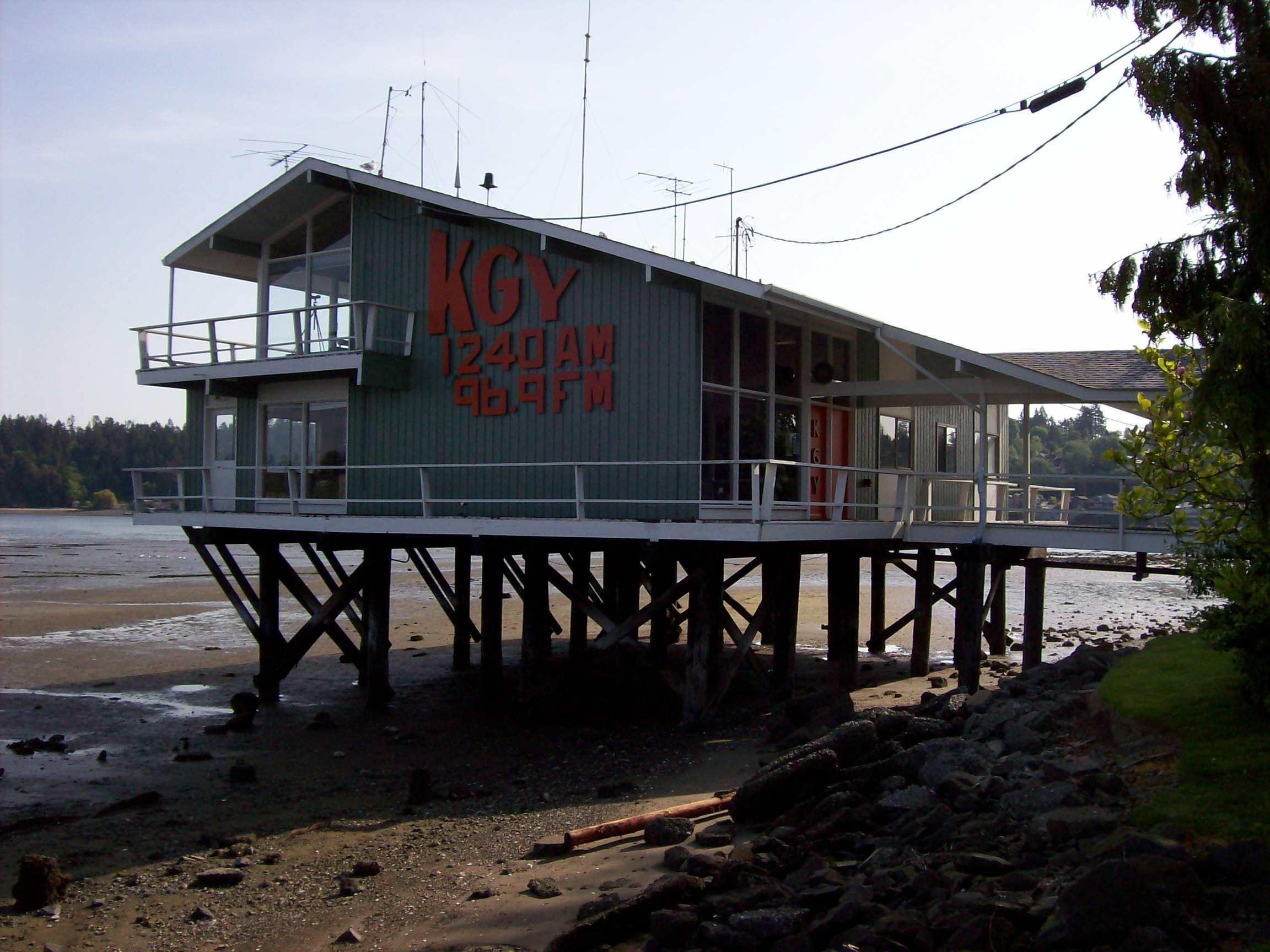
- KGY studios that were built over Budd Inlet in Olympia in 1960
- Olympia, Washington; United States
- Frequency: 1240 kHz
- Branding: Sacred Heart Radio

Programming
- Format: Catholic radio

Ownership
- Owner: Sacred Heart Radio, Inc.
- Sister stations: KBLE

History
- First air date: April 18, 1922
- Former call signs: KGY (1922–2014)

Technical information
- Licensing authority: FCC
- Facility ID: 34486
- Class: C
- Power: 1,000 watts (unlimited)
- Transmitter coordinates: 47°3′31″N 122°54′9″W
- Translator: 104.7 K284CG (Olympia)

Links
- Public license information: Public file; LMS
- Website: www.sacredheartradio.org

KBUP (1240 AM) is a radio station licensed to Olympia, Washington. Owned and operated by Sacred Heart Radio, Inc., it relays the Catholic radio programming originating at KBLE in Seattle.

KBUP is one of the oldest radio stations in the United States, and received its first broadcasting license, as KGY in Lacey, Washington, on March 30, 1922. In addition, the station traces its origin to earlier activities conducted by Father Sebastian Ruth at Saint Martin's College in Lacey. The station was acquired by Sacred Heart Radio, becoming KBUP, in 2014.

== History ==
=== 7YS ===
In early 1916, Saint Martin's College was issued a "Technical and Training School" radio license, with the call sign 7YS, for a station established by Benedictine monk Father Sebastian Ruth, O.S.B. (Note: The "7" in 7YS's call sign indicated that the station was located in the 7th Radio Inspection district, and the "Y" signified that it was operating under a "Technical and Training School" license.) After the entrance of the United States into World War I in April 1917, all civilian licenses were suspended, but following the war, 7YS was relicensed in late 1919. Initially this station was not used for broadcasting, although Ruth was very active within the American Radio Relay League (ARRL), handling relay traffic with other amateur stations, and in 1921 he was appointed an ARRL director representing the northwestern United States.

In the fall of 1920, it was reported that Ruth was broadcasting weather reports, using Morse code, every evening at 9 p.m. In July 1921, Ruth upgraded the station to use a small vacuum tube transmitter, which provided the ability to make audio transmissions, and he began a schedule of twice-weekly one hour programs transmitting phonograph records.

=== KGY ===
The Department of Commerce regulated radio stations in the United States from 1912 until the 1927 formation of the Federal Radio Commission (FRC). Originally there were no restrictions on which radio stations could make broadcasts intended for the general public. However, effective December 1, 1921, a regulation was adopted limiting broadcasting to stations operating under a Limited Commercial license. In keeping with the new standards, a broadcasting station license was issued in the name of "Saint Martin's College (Rev. S. Ruth)" on March 30, 1922, with the randomly assigned call letters of KGY, operating on the wavelength of 360 meters (833 kHz). The station signed on the air on April 18, 1922.

During the time it was operated by the college KGY had a very low power and a limited schedule, and its hours of operation were just 8:30 to 9:30 p.m. on Sundays, Tuesdays, and Thursdays. Following a series of frequency reassignments, on November 11, 1928, under the provisions of the FRC's General Order 40, the station was assigned to a "local" frequency of 1200 kHz, operating with just 10 watts of power, which was unusually small even for this time period. (Most "local" stations operated with 100 watts). KGY's original campus studio was in a shack, although there was a later move into a log cabin, with the resulting slogan "the log cabin station where the cedars meet the sea".

In 1932, the college decided it could no longer afford the expense of running a radio station, so KGY was sold to Archie Taft, who moved the station to Olympia, changed its frequency to 1210 kHz, and increased the transmitting power to 100 watts. In 1939, KGY was sold to journalist Tom Olsen; his family would own the station for 75 years.

In March 1941, under the provisions of the North American Regional Broadcasting Agreement, stations on 1210 kHz were moved to 1240, which has been the dial position of KGY and its successors ever since. KGY maintained a timesharing agreement with KTW (1250 AM) in Seattle, which required KGY to sign off at 7:30 p.m. on Thursdays, and all day Sundays, during the time periods when KTW was broadcasting.

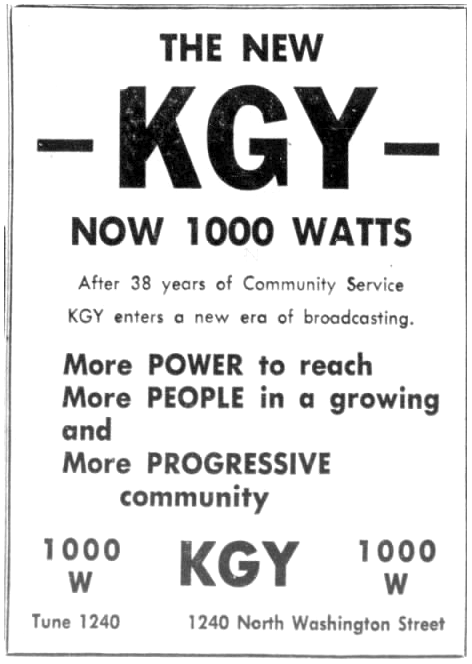
In 1960, KGY increased power to 1,000 watts.

In 1960, the station increased its power to 1,000 watts, and moved into a unique two-story building constructed on pilings over Puget Sound. At the time, the station ran a longtime Top 40 format. The station would later flip its format to middle of the road in the late-1970s, and later into full-service adult contemporary in the mid-1980s. The building has been listed on the National Register of Historic Places.

In 2014, KGY added a simulcast signal over a 220-watt translator station, K237FR located in Tumwater, Washington, broadcasting at 95.3 FM. (Technically this was a two-step process: the translator rebroadcast the HD2 digital sub-channel of KYYO in McCleary, Washington, while in turn, KYYO's HD2 signal was a rebroadcast of KGY's programming.)

=== KBUP ===
On October 14, 2014, KGY was sold for $250,000 by KGY Inc. to Sacred Heart Radio, Inc., which changed its longtime full-service AC music format to Catholic radio, simulcasting KBLE in Seattle. On November 6, 2014, KGY's call letters were changed to KBUP. Currently, there are no radio stations officially assigned the KGY call sign. However, KYYO's HD2 digital sub-channel continued with the classic hits format previously provided by KGY, which is rebroadcast by K237FR using the slogan "Olympia's 95.3 KGY".

== See also ==
- List of initial AM-band station grants in the United States
