= KBLE =

- Seattle, Washington; United States
- Frequency: 1050 kHz
- Branding: Sacred Heart Radio

Programming
- Format: Catholic radio
- Affiliations: EWTN

Ownership
- Owner: Sacred Heart Radio
- Sister stations: KBUP

History
- First air date: February 1948
- Former call signs: KRKL (1948–1954); KNBX (1954–1963)
- Call sign meaning: "Cable Radio", after the former cable car system in the city

Technical information
- Licensing authority: FCC
- Facility ID: 33667
- Class: B
- Power: 5,000 watts (day); 440 watts (night)
- Transmitter coordinates: 47°33′48″N 122°21′40″W
- Translator: 100.3 K262CX (Shoreline)

Links
- Public license information: Public file; LMS
- Webcast: Listen live
- Website: sacredheartradio.org

KBLE (1050 AM) is a radio station broadcasting a religious radio format in Seattle, Washington, United States. It is owned by Sacred Heart Radio and is the key station in a regional network broadcasting Catholic radio programming in much of Washington state as well as Kodiak, Alaska. Sacred Heart Radio maintains studios and offices in Kirkland, while KBLE is broadcast from a transmitter site in southwest Seattle. In part of the coverage area, primarily encompassing Seattle's northern suburbs, KBLE is broadcast on FM translator K262CX (100.3 MHz).

KBLE has been on the air since 1948. It was established in Kirkland but moved to Seattle in 1963, the same year it adopted its present call sign and daytime power of 5,000 watts. For almost all of its history, the station has been associated primarily with religious broadcasting,

== History ==
=== Early years ===
F. L. Thornhill, trading as the East Side Broadcasting Company, applied for a construction permit to build a new 250-watt, daytime-only radio station in Kirkland on October 8, 1946. Originally specifying 860 kHz, the application was amended to 1050 kHz before the Federal Communications Commission (FCC) granted it on June 3, 1947. The station went on the air on February 24, 1948, under the call sign KRKL, and in 1950, the station was sold to Lamar N. Ostrander and W. A. Chamness.

In 1954, KRKL was approved to increase its power from 250 to 1,000 watts, remaining a daytime-only station. After the power increase, the station changed its call sign from KRKL to KNBX on December 1, 1954 (beginning to use them on the air on December 13); the renamed station's programming continued to consist of "quality music, weather reports and the broadcast of leading gospel programs". Wilson replaced Chamness as owner in two transactions between 1958 and 1959.

Meanwhile, in 1956, KRKL filed to move from Kirkland to Seattle proper. The FCC approved of the change more than six years later, on January 23, 1963, and on December 16, the call letters were changed from KNBX to KBLE, marking its move into Seattle and an increase to 5,000 watts of power from the present southwest Seattle transmitter site. The studios were located at 114 Lakeside Avenue, near one end of a piece of Seattle's transit history. Until 1940, a cable car system—the last in Seattle to remain open—operated along Yesler Way and terminated near the studios, connecting Colman Dock to what once was a major ferry terminal serving Lake Washington. Wilson, a resident of Mercer Island, often rode the cable car en route to the ferry to the island. As a result, the owners chose what Wilson called "a significant and nostalgic bit of Seattle history" in their new call sign. Meanwhile, Ostrander and Wilson were busy expanding. With a third investor, they had started KARI at Blaine, Washington, which when it started in 1960 brought religious broadcasting to Vancouver for the first time, and FM stations in Seattle (KBLE-FM 93.3, today KJR-FM) and Bellingham (KERI-FM 104.3, today KAFE at 104.1) followed in 1964. KBLE-FM initially provided a complementary service to the AM station by broadcasting specialty foreign-language programs.

While KBLE continued to be dominated by Christian religious programming for the next 36 years, it also aired several brokered-time programs that were not religious in nature. In 1980, a Seattle radio fixture, the weekend Scandinavian Hour, landed at KBLE, airing its 2,000th episode in 1998. Broadcasting was also extended to nighttime at 440 watts on October 1, 1986, after a relaxation of rules governing clear-channel frequencies like 1050 kHz.

=== Sacred Heart Radio ===
In 2000, Ostrander and Wilson sold KBLE to HHH Broadcasting for $2.85 million. HHH turned around and sold the station just two months later to Sacred Heart Radio as its first station. The ownership change displaced all of the existing programming on the station, including the Scandinavian Hour.

Catholic radio programming from Sacred Heart Radio began in 2001. The ministry has since expanded its reach with AM stations and FM translators serving Tacoma (KLAY (1180 AM)), Olympia (KBUP (1240 AM)), Spokane (KTTO (970 AM)), Yakima, Washington (KYTR (88.1 FM)), and Kodiak, Alaska (KBKO (88.3 FM)). Ten hours a day of Sacred Heart's output is live, mixing local and EWTN programs.
