= KWWJ =

- Baytown, Texas; United States
- Broadcast area: Greater Houston
- Frequency: 1360 kHz
- Branding: Gospel 1360 KWWJ

Programming
- Language: English
- Format: Urban contemporary gospel

Ownership
- Owner: Salt of the Earth Broadcasting; (Darrell Martin interests)

History
- First air date: October 1947
- Former call signs: KREL (1948–1959); KWBA (1959–1974); KBUK (1974–1988)
- Call sign meaning: "Keep Walking With Jesus" (station slogan)

Technical information
- Facility ID: 58724
- Class: B
- Power: 5,000 watts (day); 1,000 watts (night)
- Transmitter coordinates: 29°46′28″N 95°0′55″W

Links
- Webcast: Listen live
- Website: kwwj.org

KWWJ (1360 AM) is a commercial radio station licensed to Baytown, Texas, United States, and serving Greater Houston. It airs an urban contemporary gospel format, and is owned by Salt of the Earth Broadcasting. The station is branded as Gospel 1360 KWWJ.

The transmitter and studios are on Wade Road and Decker Road (Loop 330) in Baytown.

== History ==
In October 1947, the station signed on as KREL. It was owned by Tri-Cities Broadcasting. The studio building, transmitter building, and three-tower array for "'Gospel 1360 KWWJ"' are all original to the 1360 facility.

San Diego radio investor Jack O. Gross owned the station as KBUK in the 1970s and early 1980s. His estate sold it after his death in 1985.

In 1988, the station was acquired by current owner Salt of The Earth Broadcasting. In 2017, KWWJ began broadcasting on its FM translator at 96.9 MHz. On March 3, 2018, 1360 celebrated its 70th year of operation from the original location on Decker Rd. & Loop 330 in Baytown, Texas.
