= KEES =

- Gladewater, Texas; United States
- Broadcast area: Longview-Marshall area
- Frequency: 1430 kHz
- Branding: Guadalupe Radio Network

Programming
- Format: Catholic
- Affiliations: Guadalupe Radio Network; EWTN Radio

Ownership
- Owner: La Promesa Foundation

History
- First air date: 1947
- Former call signs: KSIJ (1947–1978)

Technical information
- Licensing authority: FCC
- Facility ID: 72781
- Class: B
- Power: 5,000 watts (day); 1,000 watts (night)
- Transmitter coordinates: 32°31′46″N 94°52′50″W
- Translator: See § Translator

Links
- Public license information: Public file; LMS
- Website: grnonline.com

KEES (1430 AM) is a Catholic religious radio station, paired with an FM translator, licensed to Gladewater, Texas, United States. Affiliated with the Guadalupe Radio Network, it is owned by La Promesa Foundation.

== Translator ==
Broadcast translator for KEES
Call sign	Frequency	City of license	FID	ERP (W)	HAAT	Class	Transmitter coordinates	FCC info	Notes
K243CU	96.5 FM	Longview, Texas	202824	110	48 m (157 ft)	D	32°32′48″N 94°47′56″W	LMS	First air date: TBD

== History ==
1430 signed on the air in 1947. It was assigned the call sign KSIJ and had a power of 500 watts. In the 1950s KSIJ had a top 40/Country format that featured the station manager and program director, Tom Perryman. Thanks to Tom, KSIJ became the first station in Texas to have Elvis Presley on the air. Due to the geographic location of Gladewater and KSIJ Tom was able to get new up-and-comers from The Louisiana Hayride in Shreveport as well as the performers from the Reo Palm Isle Club in Longview. Tom brought Elvis, Willie Nelson, Ray Price, Jim Reeves, Floyd Cramer, and Johnny Horton to the station on the air and had the station promote and arrange their concerts. Tom Perryman built KSIJ into the top station in Gregg County due to his hard work and influence in the music business. Tom Perryman later went to WSM and the Grand Ole Opry, then to KGRI Henderson, Texas, and came out of retirement in 2001 to broadcast with KKUS 104.1 the Ranch in Tyler, Texas. Perryman died in 2018, and was inducted into the Texas Radio Hall of Fame in 2025.

In the 1970s, 1430 added another tower and powered up to 5,000 watts daytime and 1,000 watts night.

In the 1980s, Matt Williams bought the station and changed it from a music station to talk on AM. Williams later sold KEES to Citadel. Citadel in turn sold 1430 KEES, 600 KTBB, 1330 KDOK, 92.1 KDOK-FM, and 1490 KGKB to Paul Gleiser.

Gleiser simulcasted KTBB on KEES, as the 600 signal did not cover Gregg county very well. The simulcast ended in 2006, when Gleiser sold KEES and KGLD 1330 to its current owners Salt Of The Earth Broadcasting of Baytown, Texas.

Effective December 3, 2020, Salt of the Earth Broadcasting sold KEES to LA Promesa Foundation for $125,000.
