= KDLF =

- Boone, Iowa; United States
- Frequency: 1260 (kHz)
- Branding: La Reina 1260

Programming
- Format: Regional Mexican

Ownership
- Owner: Latin World Broadcasting, Inc.

History
- First air date: 1927 (as KFGQ)
- Former call signs: KFGQ (1927–2005); KFFF (2005–2010); KTIA (2010–2011)

Technical information
- Licensing authority: FCC
- Facility ID: 6416
- Class: D
- Power: 5,000 watts (daytime); 33 watts (nighttime)
- Transmitter coordinates: 42°02′55″N 93°53′54″W
- Translator: 96.5 K243CO (Boone)

Links
- Public license information: Public file; LMS
- Webcast: Listen live
- Website: lareina1260.com

KDLF (1260 AM) is a radio station serving the Central Iowa area. The station primarily broadcasts a Regional Mexican format. KDLF is licensed to Latin World Broadcasting, Inc. whose main business offices are located at 1541 E. Grand Ave., Des Moines, IA. The station is also broadcasting on translator K243CO, 96.5 FM, licensed to Boone, Iowa.

The KDLF antenna system uses a two-tower directional array that concentrates the signal toward the southwest.

== History ==
For nearly 80 years, the station was owned by the Boone Biblical College, serving as a religious broadcast outlet. In its early decades, the station operated on 1310 kHz with 100 watts of power and was a central part of a complex that included an orphanage and a home for the elderly. In 2005, the station dropped its original call letters to become KFFF, and in 2010, it briefly adopted the KTIA call sign before settling on its current KDLF identity on July 15, 2011.

The station is currently owned and operated by Latin World Broadcasting, Inc., which acquired the frequency in the early 2010s. Under this ownership, the station transitioned from its religious roots to a Spanish-language format, specifically focusing on Regional Mexican music and Hispanic community programming.

The station also broadcasts on an FM translator, K243CO (96.5 FM), licensed to Boone.
