= List of AM radio stations in the United States by call sign (initial letters KG–KM) =

This is a list of AM radio stations in the United States having call signs beginning with the letters KG to KM.

== KG-- ==
Callsign	Frequency	City of license
KGA	1510 AM	Spokane, Washington
KGAB	650 AM	Orchard Valley, Wyoming
KGAF	1580 AM	Gainesville, Texas
KGAK	1330 AM	Gallup, New Mexico
KGAL	1580 AM	Lebanon, Oregon
KGAS	1590 AM	Carthage, Texas
KGAY	1270 AM	Thousand Palms, California
KGB	760 AM	San Diego, California
KGBA	1490 AM	Heber, California
KGBC	1540 AM	Galveston, Texas
KGBN	1190 AM	Anaheim, California
KGDC	1320 AM	Walla Walla, Washington
KGDD	1520 AM	Oregon City, Oregon
KGED	1680 AM	Fresno, California
KGEM	1140 AM	Boise, Idaho
KGEN	1370 AM	Tulare, California
KGEO	1230 AM	Bakersfield, California
KGEZ	600 AM	Kalispell, Montana
KGFF	1450 AM	Shawnee, Oklahoma
KGFK	1590 AM	East Grand Forks, Minnesota
KGFL	1110 AM	Clinton, Arkansas
KGFW	1340 AM	Kearney, Nebraska
KGFX	1060 AM	Pierre, South Dakota
KGGF	690 AM	Coffeyville, Kansas
KGGR	1040 AM	Dallas, Texas
KGGS	1340 AM	Garden City, Kansas
KGHL	790 AM	Billings, Montana
KGHM	1340 AM	Midwest City, Oklahoma
KGHS	1230 AM	International Falls, Minnesota
KGIM	1420 AM	Aberdeen, South Dakota
KGIR	1220 AM	Cape Girardeau, Missouri
KGIW	1450 AM	Alamosa, Colorado
KGKG	1340 AM	Salida, Colorado
KGKL	960 AM	San Angelo, Texas
KGLA	830 AM	Norco, Louisiana
KGLB	1310 AM	Glencoe, Minnesota
KGLD	1330 AM	Tyler, Texas
KGLE	590 AM	Glendive, Montana
KGLN	980 AM	Glenwood Springs, Colorado
KGLO	1300 AM	Mason City, Iowa
KGME	910 AM	Phoenix, Arizona
KGMI	790 AM	Bellingham, Washington
KGMR	1360 AM	Clarksville, Arkansas
KGMS	940 AM	Tucson, Arizona
KGMT	1310 AM	Fairbury, Nebraska
KGMY	1400 AM	Springfield, Missouri
KGNB	1420 AM	New Braunfels, Texas
KGNC	710 AM	Amarillo, Texas
KGND	1470 AM	Vinita, Oklahoma
KGNO	1370 AM	Dodge City, Kansas
KGNU	1390 AM	Denver, Colorado
KGNW	820 AM	Burien–Seattle, Washington
KGOL	1180 AM	Humble, Texas
KGOS	1490 AM	Torrington, Wyoming
KGOW	1560 AM	Bellaire, Texas
KGRE	1450 AM	Greeley, Colorado
KGRG	1330 AM	Enumclaw, Washington
KGRN	1410 AM	Grinnell, Iowa
KGRO	1230 AM	Pampa, Texas
KGRV	700 AM	Winston, Oregon
KGRZ	1450 AM	Missoula, Montana
KGSO	1410 AM	Wichita, Kansas
KGST	1600 AM	Fresno, California
KGSV	660 AM	Oildale, California
KGTK	920 AM	Olympia, Washington
KGTL	620 AM	Homer, Alaska
KGTO	1050 AM	Tulsa, Oklahoma
KGU	760 AM	Honolulu, Hawaii
KGUM	567 AM	Agana, Guam
KGVL	1400 AM	Greenville, Texas
KGVO	1290 AM	Missoula, Montana
KGVY	1080 AM	Green Valley, Arizona
KGWA	960 AM	Enid, Oklahoma
KGWU	1400 AM	Uvalde, Texas
KGYM	1600 AM	Cedar Rapids, Iowa
KGYN	1210 AM	Guymon, Oklahoma

== KH-- ==
Callsign	Frequency	City of license
KHAC	880 AM	Tse Bonito, New Mexico
KHAR	590 AM	Anchorage, Alaska
KHAS	1230 AM	Hastings, Nebraska
KHAT	1210 AM	Laramie, Wyoming
KHBM	1430 AM	Monticello, Arkansas
KHBR	1560 AM	Hillsboro, Texas
KHCB	1400 AM	League City, Texas
KHCH	1410 AM	Huntsville, Texas
KHCM	880 AM	Honolulu, Hawaii
KHDN	1230 AM	Hardin, Montana
KHDY	1350 AM	Clarksville, Texas
KHEY	1380 AM	El Paso, Texas
KHFX	1140 AM	Cleburne, Texas
KHGZ	670 AM	Glenwood, Arkansas
KHHO	850 AM	Tacoma, Washington
KHIL	1250 AM	Willcox, Arizona
KHIT	1450 AM	Reno, Nevada
KHJ	930 AM	Los Angeles
KHKA	1500 AM	Honolulu, Hawaii
KHKR	1210 AM	Washington, Utah
KHLO	850 AM	Hilo, Hawaii
KHLY	1440 AM	Hailey, Idaho
KHMO	1070 AM	Hannibal, Missouri
KHNC	1360 AM	Johnstown, Colorado
KHND	1470 AM	Harvey, North Dakota
KHNK	1240 AM	Whitefish, Montana
KHNR	690 AM	Honolulu, Hawaii
KHOB	1390 AM	Hobbs, New Mexico
KHOJ	1460 AM	St. Charles, Missouri
KHOT	1250 AM	Madera, California
KHOW	630 AM	Denver, Colorado
KHOZ	900 AM	Harrison, Arkansas
KHPY	1670 AM	Moreno Valley, California
KHQN	1480 AM	Spanish Fork, Utah
KHRO	1150 AM	El Paso, Texas
KHRT	1320 AM	Minot, North Dakota
KHSE	700 AM	Wylie, Texas
KHSN	1230 AM	Coos Bay, Oregon
KHTC	1490 AM	Malmstrom Air Force Base, Montana
KHTK	1140 AM	Sacramento, California
KHTS	1220 AM	Canyon Country, California
KHTW	1300 AM	Lumberton, Texas
KHTY	970 AM	Bakersfield, California
KHUB	1340 AM	Fremont, Nebraska
KHVH	830 AM	Honolulu, Hawaii
KHVL	1490 AM	Huntsville, Texas
KHVN	970 AM	Fort Worth, Texas
KHWK	1380 AM	Winona, Minnesota
KHXM	1370 AM	Pearl City, Hawaii

== KI-- ==
Callsign	Frequency	City of license
KIAM	630 AM	Nenana, Alaska
KIBL	1490 AM	Beeville, Texas
KIBM	1490 AM	Omaha, Nebraska
KICD	1240 AM	Spencer, Iowa
KICH	630 AM	Agana, Guam
KICK	1340 AM	Springfield, Missouri
KICS	1550 AM	Hastings, Nebraska
KICY	850 AM	Nome, Alaska
KIDO	580 AM	Nampa, Idaho
KIDR	740 AM	Phoenix, Arizona
KIFG	1510 AM	Iowa Falls, Iowa
KIFM	1320 AM	West Sacramento, California
KIFW	1230 AM	Sitka, Alaska
KIGO	1420 AM	St. Anthony, Idaho
KIGS	620 AM	Hanford, California
KIHC	890 AM	Arroyo Grande, California
KIHH	1400 AM	Eureka, California
KIHM	920 AM	Reno, Nevada
KIHP	1310 AM	Mesa, Arizona
KIHR	1340 AM	Hood River, Oregon
KIHU	1010 AM	Tooele, Utah
KIID	1470 AM	Sacramento, California
KIIK	1270 AM	Waynesville, Missouri
KIIX	1410 AM	Fort Collins, Colorado
KIJN	1060 AM	Farwell, Texas
KIJV	1340 AM	Huron, South Dakota
KIKC	1250 AM	Forsyth, Montana
KIKI	990 AM	Honolulu, Hawaii
KIKK	650 AM	Pasadena, Texas
KIKO	1340 AM	Apache Junction, Arizona
KIKR	1450 AM	Beaumont, Texas
KIKZ	1250 AM	Seminole, Texas
KILJ	1130 AM	Mount Pleasant, Iowa
KILR	1070 AM	Estherville, Iowa
KILT	610 AM	Houston, Texas
KIML	1270 AM	Gillette, Wyoming
KIMM	1150 AM	Rapid City, South Dakota
KIMP	960 AM	Mount Pleasant, Texas
KINA	910 AM	Salina, Kansas
KIND	1010 AM	Independence, Kansas
KINE	1330 AM	Kingsville, Texas
KINN	1270 AM	Alamogordo, New Mexico
KINO	1230 AM	Winslow, Arizona
KINY	800 AM	Juneau, Alaska
KIOL	1370 AM	Iola, Kansas
KION	1460 AM	Salinas, California
KIOU	1480 AM	Shreveport, Louisiana
KIPA	1060 AM	Hilo, Hawaii
KIQI	1010 AM	San Francisco, California
KIQS	1560 AM	Willows, California
KIRN	670 AM	Simi Valley, California
KIRO	710 AM	Seattle, Washington
KIRT	1580 AM	Mission, Texas
KIRV	1510 AM	Fresno, California
KIRX	1450 AM	Kirksville, Missouri
KIT	1280 AM	Yakima, Washington
KITE	1410 AM	Victoria, Texas
KITI	1420 AM	Centralia–Chehalis, Washington
KITZ	1400 AM	Silverdale, Washington
KIUL	1240 AM	Garden City, Kansas
KIUN	1400 AM	Pecos, Texas
KIUP	930 AM	Durango, Colorado
KIVA	1600 AM	Albuquerque, New Mexico
KIVY	1290 AM	Crockett, Texas
KIWA	1550 AM	Sheldon, Iowa
KIXD	1480 AM	Pueblo, Colorado
KIXI	880 AM	Mercer Island/Seattle, Washington
KIXL	970 AM	Del Valle, Texas
KIXR	1400 AM	Provo, Utah
KIXW	960 AM	Apple Valley, California
KIXZ	940 AM	Amarillo, Texas

== KJ-- ==
Callsign	Frequency	City of license
KJAA	1240 AM	Globe, Arizona
KJAM	1390 AM	Madison, South Dakota
KJAN	1220 AM	Atlantic, Iowa
KJAY	1430 AM	Sacramento, California
KJBN	1050 AM	Little Rock, Arkansas
KJCE	1370 AM	Rollingwood, Texas
KJCK	1420 AM	Junction City, Kansas
KJCR	1240 AM	Billings, Montana
KJCV	1450 AM	Jackson, Wyoming
KJCW	1100 AM	Webb City, Missouri
KJDJ	1030 AM	San Luis Obispo, California
KJDY	1400 AM	John Day, Oregon
KJFF	1400 AM	Festus, Missouri
KJFK	1490 AM	Austin, Texas
KJIM	1500 AM	Sherman, Texas
KJIN	1490 AM	Houma, Louisiana
KJJC	1230 AM	Murray, Utah
KJJD	1170 AM	Windsor, Colorado
KJJK	1020 AM	Fergus Falls, Minnesota
KJJQ	910 AM	Volga, South Dakota
KJJR	880 AM	Whitefish, Montana
KJLT	970 AM	North Platte, Nebraska
KJMJ	580 AM	Alexandria, Louisiana
KJMP	870 AM	Pierce, Colorado
KJMU	1340 AM	Sand Springs, Oklahoma
KJNO	630 AM	Juneau, Alaska
KJNP	1170 AM	North Pole, Alaska
KJNT	1490 AM	Jackson, Wyoming
KJOL	620 AM	Grand Junction, Colorado
KJON	850 AM	Carrollton, Texas
KJOP	1240 AM	Lemoore, California
KJOQ	1490 AM	Duluth, Minnesota
KJOX	1340 AM	Kennewick, Washington
KJOZ	880 AM	Conroe, Texas
KJPG	1050 AM	Frazier Park, California
KJPR	1330 AM	Shasta Lake City, California
KJPW	1390 AM	Waynesville, Missouri
KJR	950 AM	Seattle, Washington
KJRB	790 AM	Spokane, Washington
KJRG	950 AM	Newton, Kansas
KJSK	900 AM	Columbus, Nebraska
KJXX	1170 AM	Jackson, Missouri
KJYE	1400 AM	Delta, Colorado

== KK-- ==
Callsign	Frequency	City of license
KKAM	1340 AM	Lubbock, Texas
KKAN	1490 AM	Phillipsburg, Kansas
KKAQ	1460 AM	Thief River Falls, Minnesota
KKAT	860 AM	Salt Lake City, Utah
KKAY	1590 AM	White Castle, Louisiana
KKBJ	1360 AM	Bemidji, Minnesota
KKCL	1550 AM	Golden, Colorado
KKCQ	1480 AM	Fosston, Minnesota
KKDA	730 AM	Grand Prairie, Texas
KKDD	1290 AM	San Bernardino, California
KKDZ	1250 AM	Seattle, Washington
KKEA	1420 AM	Honolulu, Hawaii
KKGK	1340 AM	Las Vegas, Nevada
KKGM	1630 AM	Ft. Worth, Texas
KKGO	1260 AM	Beverly Hills, California
KKGR	680 AM	East Helena, Montana
KKGX	920 AM	Palm Springs, California
KKIM	1000 AM	Albuquerque, New Mexico
KKIN	930 AM	Aitkin, Minnesota
KKJL	1400 AM	San Luis Obispo, California
KKLE	1550 AM	Winfield, Kansas
KKLO	1410 AM	Leavenworth, Kansas
KKLS	920 AM	Rapid City, South Dakota
KKMC	880 AM	Gonzales, California
KKMO	1360 AM	Tacoma, Washington
KKMP	1440 AM	Garapan-Saipan, Northern Marianas Islands
KKMS	980 AM	Richfield, Minnesota
KKNE	940 AM	Waipahu, Hawaii
KKNO	750 AM	Gretna, Louisiana
KKNS	1310 AM	Corrales, New Mexico
KKNT	960 AM	Phoenix, Arizona
KKNW	1150 AM	Seattle, Washington
KKNX	840 AM	Eugene, Oregon
KKOB	770 AM	Albuquerque, New Mexico
KKOH	780 AM	Reno, Nevada
KKOJ	1190 AM	Jackson, Minnesota
KKOL	1300 AM	Seattle, Washington
KKOO	1260 AM	Weiser, Idaho
KKOR	1230 AM	Astoria, Oregon
KKOV	1550 AM	Vancouver, Washington
KKOW	860 AM	Pittsburg, Kansas
KKOY	1460 AM	Chanute, Kansas
KKOZ	1430 AM	Ava, Missouri
KKRK	970 AM	Rupert, Idaho
KKRT	900 AM	Wenatchee, Washington
KKRX	1380 AM	Lawton, Oklahoma
KKSA	1260 AM	San Angelo, Texas
KKSB	1230 AM	Steamboat Springs, Colorado
KKSE	950 AM	Denver, Colorado
KKSF	910 AM	Oakland, California
KKSM	1320 AM	Oceanside, California
KKTK	1400 AM	Texarkana, Texas
KKTL	1400 AM	Casper, Wyoming
KKTS	1580 AM	Evansville, Wyoming
KKTX	1360 AM	Corpus Christi, Texas
KKTY	1470 AM	Douglas, Wyoming
KKUB	1300 AM	Brownfield, Texas
KKVV	1060 AM	Las Vegas, Nevada
KKXA	1520 AM	Snohomish, Washington
KKXL	1440 AM	Grand Forks, North Dakota
KKXX	930 AM	Paradise, California
KKYX	680 AM	San Antonio, Texas
KKZI	1310 AM	Barstow, California

== KL-- ==
Callsign	Frequency	City of license
KLAA	830 AM	Orange, California
KLAC	570 AM	Los Angeles
KLAD	960 AM	Klamath Falls, Oregon
KLAM	1450 AM	Cordova, Alaska
KLAR	1300 AM	Laredo, Texas
KLAT	1010 AM	Houston, Texas
KLAV	1230 AM	Las Vegas, Nevada
KLAY	1180 AM	Lakewood, Washington
KLBJ	590 AM	Austin, Texas
KLBM	1450 AM	La Grande, Oregon
KLBS	1330 AM	Los Banos, California
KLCB	1230 AM	Libby, Montana
KLCK	1400 AM	Goldendale, Washington
KLCL	1470 AM	Lake Charles, Louisiana
KLDC	1220 AM	Denver, Colorado
KLDS	1260 AM	Falfurrias, Texas
KLDY	1280 AM	Lacey, Washington
KLEB	1600 AM	Golden Meadow, Louisiana
KLEE	1480 AM	Ottumwa, Iowa
KLEM	1410 AM	Le Mars, Iowa
KLER	1300 AM	Orofino, Idaho
KLEX	1570 AM	Lexington, Missouri
KLEY	1130 AM	Wellington, Kansas
KLFD	1410 AM	Litchfield, Minnesota
KLFE	1590 AM	Seattle, Washington
KLGN	1390 AM	Logan, Utah
KLGR	1490 AM	Redwood Falls, Minnesota
KLGZ	1600 AM	Algona, Iowa
KLHC	1350 AM	Bakersfield, California
KLHT	1040 AM	Honolulu, Hawaii
KLIB	1110 AM	Roseville, California
KLID	1340 AM	Poplar Bluff, Missouri
KLIF	570 AM	Dallas, Texas
KLIK	1240 AM	Jefferson City, Missouri
KLIN	1400 AM	Lincoln, Nebraska
KLIV	1590 AM	San Jose, California
KLIX	1310 AM	Twin Falls, Idaho
KLIZ	1380 AM	Brainerd, Minnesota
KLKC	1540 AM	Parsons, Kansas
KLLA	1570 AM	Leesville, Louisiana
KLLK	1250 AM	Willits, California
KLLV	550 AM	Breen, Colorado
KLMR	920 AM	Lamar, Colorado
KLMS	1480 AM	Lincoln, Nebraska
KLMX	1450 AM	Clayton, New Mexico
KLNG	1560 AM	Council Bluffs, Iowa
KLNT	1490 AM	Laredo, Texas
KLOA	1240 AM	Ridgecrest, California
KLOC	1390 AM	Turlock, California
KLOE	730 AM	Goodland, Kansas
KLOG	1490 AM	Kelso, Washington
KLOH	1050 AM	Pipestone, Minnesota
KLOK	1170 AM	San Jose, California
KLOO	1340 AM	Corvallis, Oregon
KLPF	1180 AM	Midland, Texas
KLPW	1220 AM	Union, Missouri
KLPZ	1380 AM	Parker, Arizona
KLQR	1510 AM	Larned, Kansas
KLRG	880 AM	Sheridan, Arkansas
KLSD	1360 AM	San Diego, California
KLSQ	870 AM	Whitney, Nevada
KLTC	1460 AM	Dickinson, North Dakota
KLTF	960 AM	Little Falls, Minnesota
KLTI	1560 AM	Macon, Missouri
KLTK	1140 AM	Centerton, Arkansas
KLTT	670 AM	Commerce City, Colorado
KLTX	1390 AM	Long Beach, California
KLTZ	1240 AM	Glasgow, Montana
KLUP	930 AM	Terrell Hills, Texas
KLVG	780 AM	Fountain, Colorado
KLVI	560 AM	Beaumont, Texas
KLVL	1480 AM	Pasadena, Texas
KLVQ	1410 AM	Athens, Texas
KLVT	1230 AM	Levelland, Texas
KLVZ	810 AM	Brighton, Colorado
KLWN	1320 AM	Lawrence, Kansas
KLXR	1230 AM	Redding, California
KLXX	1270 AM	Bismarck–Mandan, North Dakota
KLYC	1260 AM	McMinnville, Oregon
KLYQ	1240 AM	Hamilton, Montana
KLYR	1540 AM	Ozark, Arkansas
KLZ	560 AM	Denver, Colorado
KLZN	1490 AM	Susanville, California

== KM-- ==
Callsign	Frequency	City of license
KMA	960 AM	Shenandoah, Iowa
KMAD	1550 AM	Madill, Oklahoma
KMAJ	1440 AM	Topeka, Kansas
KMAL	1470 AM	Malden, Missouri
KMAN	1350 AM	Manhattan, Kansas
KMAQ	1320 AM	Maquoketa, Iowa
KMAS	1030 AM	Shelton, Washington
KMAX	840 AM	Colfax, Washington
KMBL	1450 AM	Junction, Texas
KMBS	1310 AM	West Monroe, Louisiana
KMBX	700 AM	Soledad, California
KMBY	1240 AM	Monterey Bay, California
KMBZ	980 AM	Kansas City, Missouri
KMCD	1570 AM	Fairfield, Iowa
KMCP	1540 AM	McPherson, Kansas
KMDO	1600 AM	Fort Scott, Kansas
KMER	940 AM	Kemmerer, Wyoming
KMES	1430 AM	Ogden, Utah
KMET	1490 AM	Banning, California
KMFR	1280 AM	Pearsall, Texas
KMFS	1490 AM	Guthrie, Oklahoma
KMHI	1240 AM	Mountain Home, Idaho
KMHL	1400 AM	Marshall, Minnesota
KMHR	950 AM	Boise, Idaho
KMHS	1420 AM	Coos Bay, Oregon
KMHT	1450 AM	Marshall, Texas
KMIA	1210 AM	Auburn–Federal Way, Washington
KMIC	1590 AM	Houston, Texas
KMIN	980 AM	Grants, New Mexico
KMIS	1050 AM	Portageville, Missouri
KMJ	580 AM	Fresno, California
KMJC	620 AM	Mount Shasta, California
KMJM	1360 AM	Cedar Rapids, Iowa
KMKY	1310 AM	Oakland, California
KMLB	540 AM	Monroe, Louisiana
KMMJ	750 AM	Grand Island, Nebraska
KMMM	1290 AM	Pratt, Kansas
KMMO	1300 AM	Marshall, Missouri
KMMQ	1020 AM	Plattsmouth, Nebraska
KMMS	1450 AM	Bozeman, Montana
KMND	1510 AM	Midland, Texas
KMNQ	1470 AM	Brooklyn Park, Minnesota
KMNS	620 AM	Sioux City, Iowa
KMNV	1400 AM	St. Paul, Minnesota
KMNY	1360 AM	Hurst, Texas
KMOG	1420 AM	Payson, Arizona
KMON	560 AM	Great Falls, Montana
KMOX	1120 AM	St. Louis, Missouri
KMOZ	1590 AM	Rolla, Missouri
KMPC	1540 AM	Los Angeles
KMPG	1520 AM	Hollister, California
KMPH	840 AM	Modesto, California
KMPS	910 AM	Hesperia, California
KMPT	930 AM	East Missoula, Montana
KMRB	1430 AM	San Gabriel, California
KMRC	1430 AM	Morgan City, Louisiana
KMRF	1510 AM	Marshfield, Missouri
KMRI	1550 AM	West Valley City, Utah
KMRN	1360 AM	Cameron, Missouri
KMRS	1230 AM	Morris, Minnesota
KMRY	1450 AM	Cedar Rapids, Iowa
KMSD	1510 AM	Milbank, South Dakota
KMSR	1520 AM	Northwood, North Dakota
KMTA	1050 AM	Miles City, Montana
KMTI	650 AM	Manti, Utah
KMTL	760 AM	Sherwood, Arkansas
KMTT	910 AM	Vancouver, Washington
KMUS	1380 AM	Sperry, Oklahoma
KMVG	890 AM	Gladstone, Missouri
KMVI	900 AM	Kahului, Hawaii
KMVL	1220 AM	Madisonville, Texas
KMXA	1090 AM	Aurora, Colorado
KMXO	1500 AM	Merkel, Texas
KMYC	1410 AM	Marysville, California
KMZN	740 AM	Oskaloosa, Iowa
KMZQ	670 AM	Las Vegas, Nevada

== See also ==
- North American call sign
