= 1450 AM =

AM radio frequency

The following radio stations broadcast on AM frequency 1450 kHz: 1450 AM is a Regional and Local broadcast frequency.

== Argentina ==
- LRJ211 in San Juan.
- LRI203 El Sol in Buenos Aires.

== Bermuda ==
- VSB

== Canada ==
| Call sign | City of license | Daytime power (kW) | Nighttime power (kW) | Transmitter coordinates |
|---|---|---|---|---|
| CBKA | Stewart, British Columbia | 0.04 | 0.04 | 55.942778°N 129.993333°W |
| CBLF | Foleyet, Ontario | 0.04 | 0.04 | 48.2378°N 82.4347°W |
| CFAB | Windsor, Nova Scotia | 1 | 1 | 44.995278°N 64.113611°W |
| CHMO | Moosonee, Ontario | 0.05 | 0.05 | 51.2775°N 80.6442°W |
| CHOU | Montreal, Quebec | 2 | 1 | 45.4958°N 73.7439°W |

== Mexico ==
- XERNB-AM in Sahuayo, Michoacán
- XERY-AM in Arcelia, Guerrero

== United States ==
| Call sign | City of license | Facility ID | Class | Daytime power (kW) | Nighttime power (kW) | Unlimited power (kW) | Transmitter coordinates |
|---|---|---|---|---|---|---|---|
| KATE | Albert Lea, Minnesota | 12670 | C | | | 1 | 43.633333°N 93.370833°W |
| KAVP | Colona, Colorado | 82282 | C | 1 | 1 | | 38.387778°N 107.674444°W |
| KBBS | Buffalo, Wyoming | 32988 | C | | | 1 | 44.3425°N 106.681667°W |
| KBFI | Bonners Ferry, Idaho | 54500 | C | | | 1 | 48.688889°N 116.334444°W |
| KBFS | Belle Fourche, South Dakota | 68739 | C | | | 1 | 44.667222°N 103.856111°W |
| KBKW | Aberdeen, Washington | 33623 | C | 1 | 1 | | 46.948611°N 123.82°W |
| KBMW | Breckenridge, Minnesota | 70500 | C | 1 | 1 | | 46.280556°N 96.588056°W |
| KBPS | Portland, Oregon | 4782 | C | 1 | 1 | | 45.527222°N 122.650833°W |
| KBUN | Bemidji, Minnesota | 51879 | C | | | 1 | 47.465556°N 94.905556°W |
| KCLX | Colfax, Washington | 15270 | C | 1 | 0.9 | | 46.913889°N 117.324444°W |
| KCTI | Gonzales, Texas | 24564 | C | 1 | 1 | | 29.509722°N 97.414167°W |
| KCYL | Lampasas, Texas | 57584 | C | | | 0.8 | 31.049167°N 98.169444°W |
| KEED | Eugene, Oregon | 40889 | C | | | 1 | 44.081667°N 123.109444°W |
| KEST | San Francisco, California | 17410 | C | 1 | 0.96 | | 37.716111°N 122.393889°W |
| KEYY | Provo, Utah | 5201 | C | | | 1 | 40.230278°N 111.686667°W |
| KEZJ | Twin Falls, Idaho | 3402 | C | 1 | 1 | | 42.543333°N 114.470556°W |
| KFIZ | Fond du Lac, Wisconsin | 36419 | C | | | 1 | 43.791111°N 88.471111°W |
| KFLS | Klamath Falls, Oregon | 74250 | C | 1 | 1 | | 42.205°N 121.759722°W |
| KFSD | Escondido, California | 49205 | C | 1 | 1 | | 33.117222°N 117.119167°W |
| KGFF | Shawnee, Oklahoma | 28152 | C | 1 | 1 | | 35.352778°N 96.8775°W |
| KGIW | Alamosa, Colorado | 12814 | C | | | 1 | 37.472222°N 105.853611°W |
| KGRE | Greeley, Colorado | 33821 | C | | | 1 | 40.4375°N 104.723611°W |
| KGRZ | Missoula, Montana | 63879 | C | | | 1 | 46.8775°N 114.043333°W |
| KHIT | Reno, Nevada | 38458 | C | 1 | 1 | | 39.574167°N 119.846667°W |
| KIRX | Kirksville, Missouri | 34974 | C | | | 1 | 40.206667°N 92.575278°W |
| KJCV | Jackson, Wyoming | 160983 | C | 1 | 1 | | 43.4625°N 110.793611°W |
| KLAM | Cordova, Alaska | 56491 | B | | | 0.25 | 60.538889°N 145.759722°W |
| KLBM | La Grande, Oregon | 35047 | C | | | 1 | 45.329167°N 118.066667°W |
| KLMX | Clayton, New Mexico | 31888 | C | | | 1 | 36.444167°N 103.19°W |
| KMBL | Junction, Texas | 47067 | C | | | 1 | 30.492778°N 99.761389°W |
| KMHT | Marshall, Texas | 72450 | C | 0.65 | 0.65 | | 32.563889°N 94.351944°W |
| KMMS | Bozeman, Montana | 24170 | C | 1 | 1 | | 45.698333°N 111.028056°W |
| KMRY | Cedar Rapids, Iowa | 17697 | C | | | 1 | 42.006944°N 91.708056°W |
| KNET | Palestine, Texas | 72837 | C | 0.63 | 0.63 | | 31.772778°N 95.616389°W |
| KNHD | Camden, Arkansas | 27124 | C | | | 1 | 33.563611°N 92.843611°W |
| KNOC | Natchitoches, Louisiana | 8518 | C | | | 1 | 31.763056°N 93.063056°W |
| KNOT | Prescott, Arizona | 52000 | C | | | 1 | 34.545°N 112.446111°W |
| KNSI | St. Cloud, Minnesota | 37002 | C | | | 1 | 45.539167°N 94.168056°W |
| KOBE | Las Cruces, New Mexico | 54945 | C | | | 1 | 32.301944°N 106.802222°W |
| KOBO | Yuba City, California | 17408 | C | 0.166 | 0.82 | | 39.106111°N 121.655278°W |
| KOKO | Warrensburg, Missouri | 31890 | C | | | 1 | 38.775556°N 93.72°W |
| KONP | Port Angeles, Washington | 54717 | C | 1 | 0.91 | | 48.098611°N 123.405556°W |
| KQDI | Great Falls, Montana | 32387 | C | | | 0.72 | 47.465556°N 111.322778°W |
| KQTE | Helendale, California | 160413 | C | 0.76 | 0.76 | | 34.740556°N 117.363889°W |
| KQYX | Galena, Kansas | 5268 | C | 0.94 | 0.94 | | 37.069444°N 94.546944°W |
| KRZY | Albuquerque, New Mexico | 12634 | C | | | 1 | 35.132222°N 106.621667°W |
| KSEL | Portales, New Mexico | 4815 | C | 0.95 | 0.95 | | 34.1975°N 103.323333°W |
| KSGO | St. George, Utah | 12325 | C | 1 | 1 | | 37.038056°N 113.636667°W |
| KSIG | Crowley, Louisiana | 342 | C | | | 1 | 30.229167°N 92.349722°W |
| KSIW | Woodward, Oklahoma | 22822 | C | 1 | 1 | | 36.428333°N 99.402778°W |
| KSNY | Snyder, Texas | 60710 | C | | | 1 | 32.725833°N 100.941667°W |
| KSUH | Puyallup, Washington | 32339 | C | | | 1 | 47.178056°N 122.273333°W |
| KTIP | Porterville, California | 17388 | C | | | 1 | 36.095556°N 119.052778°W |
| KTRP | Notus, Idaho | 42649 | C | 1 | 1 | | 43.845556°N 116.755833°W |
| KTZR | Tucson, Arizona | 68316 | C | | | 1 | 32.201111°N 110.946667°W |
| KVCK | Wolf Point, Montana | 73385 | C | | | 1 | 48.088333°N 105.656111°W |
| KVML | Sonora, California | 11711 | C | | | 0.94 | 38.008333°N 120.362222°W |
| KVOW | Riverton, Wyoming | 56591 | C | | | 1 | 43.026389°N 108.345833°W |
| KVSI | Montpelier, Idaho | 67811 | C | 1 | 1 | | 42.317222°N 111.322222°W |
| KWBE | Beatrice, Nebraska | 12950 | C | | | 0.53 | 40.263611°N 96.774167°W |
| KWBW | Hutchinson, Kansas | 18069 | C | | | 1 | 38.072778°N 97.964722°W |
| KWES | Ruidoso, New Mexico | 160917 | C | 1 | 0.91 | | 33.326111°N 105.670556°W |
| KWHW | Altus, Oklahoma | 1195 | C | 0.668 | 0.668 | | 34.626389°N 99.336111°W |
| KWPM | West Plains, Missouri | 47952 | C | | | 1 | 36.741111°N 91.833611°W |
| KYLS | Fredericktown, Missouri | 39584 | C | | | 1 | 37.583333°N 90.291944°W |
| KYNT | Yankton, South Dakota | 60857 | C | | | 1 | 42.891667°N 97.419444°W |
| KZZJ | Rugby, North Dakota | 57928 | C | | | 1 | 48.353889°N 99.991944°W |
| WAOV | Vincennes, Indiana | 50238 | C | 1 | 1 | | 38.707222°N 87.495°W |
| WASK | Lafayette, Indiana | 71065 | C | 1 | 1 | | 40.402222°N 86.849722°W |
| WATA | Boone, North Carolina | 71068 | C | | | 1 | 36.216389°N 81.701667°W |
| WBHF | Cartersville, Georgia | 22669 | C | 1 | 1 | | 34.185833°N 84.803611°W |
| WBSR | Pensacola, Florida | 18399 | C | | | 1 | 30.428889°N 87.240833°W |
| WCJU | Columbia, Mississippi | 71281 | C | | | 1 | 31.237222°N 89.84°W |
| WCON | Cornelia, Georgia | 25813 | C | | | 1 | 34.515833°N 83.538889°W |
| WCPR | Coamo, Puerto Rico | 12136 | B | | | 1 | 18.091389°N 66.370833°W |
| WCRS | Greenwood, South Carolina | 25239 | C | | | 1 | 34.209444°N 82.151389°W |
| WCTC | New Brunswick, New Jersey | 55180 | C | | | 1 | 40.492222°N 74.419722°W |
| WDAD | Indiana, Pennsylvania | 56645 | C | | | 1 | 40.638056°N 79.146389°W |
| WDIG | Dothan, Alabama | 17461 | C | | | 1 | 31.219444°N 85.370556°W |
| WDLB | Marshfield, Wisconsin | 24443 | C | 0.75 | 1 | | 44.696944°N 90.155556°W |
| WDNG | Anniston, Alabama | 71344 | C | 1 | 1 | | 33.664167°N 85.849444°W |
| WDXR | Paducah, Kentucky | 40637 | C | | | 0.25 | 37.098611°N 88.621944°W |
| WELY | Ely, Minnesota | 5386 | C | 0.77 | 0.77 | | 47.894444°N 91.863889°W |
| WENI | Corning, New York | 53610 | C | 1 | 0.93 | | 42.116389°N 77.04°W |
| WFMB | Springfield, Illinois | 48333 | C | | | 1 | 39.76°N 89.651389°W |
| WFRA | Franklin, Pennsylvania | 49777 | C | | | 0.99 | 41.391667°N 79.811389°W |
| WFTR | Front Royal, Virginia | 63530 | C | | | 1 | 38.908611°N 78.176944°W |
| WGNC | Gastonia, North Carolina | 35657 | C | | | 1 | 35.275556°N 81.201111°W |
| WGNS | Murfreesboro, Tennessee | 66335 | C | | | 1 | 35.840556°N 86.390833°W |
| WHKP | Hendersonville, North Carolina | 54615 | C | 0.97 | 0.97 | | 35.338889°N 82.455556°W |
| WHLL | Springfield, Massachusetts | 36545 | C | 1 | 1 | | 42.109167°N 72.611111°W |
| WHRY | Hurley, Wisconsin | 5235 | C | | | 1 | 46.415556°N 90.159444°W |
| WHTC | Holland, Michigan | 27470 | C | | | 1 | 42.794722°N 86.106111°W |
| WIBM | Jackson, Michigan | 9248 | C | 0.81 | 0.81 | | 42.237222°N 84.364444°W |
| WILM | Wilmington, Delaware | 16438 | C | | | 1 | 39.729444°N 75.551944°W |
| WIOE | Fort Wayne, Indiana | 42082 | C | 1 | 1 | | 41.070556°N 85.119444°W |
| WIZS | Henderson, North Carolina | 57674 | C | 1 | 1 | | 36.337222°N 78.419722°W |
| WJER | Dover-New Philadelphia, Ohio | 73134 | C | | | 1 | 40.512778°N 81.456944°W |
| WJPA | Washington, Pennsylvania | 70947 | C | | | 1 | 40.189722°N 80.233889°W |
| WKAL | Rome, New York | 72067 | C | 1 | 1 | | 43.205°N 75.479167°W |
| WKAT | Miami, Florida | 43034 | C | 1 | 1 | | 25.839444°N 80.189722°W |
| WKEI | Kewanee, Illinois | 70276 | C | 0.5 | 1 | | 41.226667°N 89.934722°W |
| WKEU | Griffin, Georgia | 16783 | C | | | 1 | 33.24°N 84.248611°W |
| WKIP | Poughkeepsie, New York | 73163 | C | 1 | 0.91 | | 41.705°N 73.887778°W |
| WKLA | Ludington, Michigan | 10810 | C | | | 1 | 43.951389°N 86.424444°W |
| WKXL | Concord, New Hampshire | 8694 | C | | | 1 | 43.194167°N 71.554722°W |
| WLAF | La Follette, Tennessee | 8493 | C | | | 1 | 36.381111°N 84.125556°W |
| WLAR | Athens, Tennessee | 29953 | C | | | 1 | 35.445556°N 84.611944°W |
| WLAY | Muscle Shoals, Alabama | 60611 | C | 1 | 1 | | 34.756389°N 87.685556°W |
| WLEC | Sandusky, Ohio | 19705 | C | | | 1 | 41.441111°N 82.687222°W |
| WLEJ | State College, Pennsylvania | 48923 | C | | | 1 | 40.808889°N 77.841111°W |
| WLMR | Chattanooga, Tennessee | 24721 | C | | | 1 | 35.048333°N 85.273889°W |
| WLUX | Dunbar, West Virginia | 160953 | C | 1 | 1 | | 38.349167°N 81.748056°W |
| WMFJ | Daytona Beach, Florida | 57081 | C | | | 1 | 29.225°N 81.025°W |
| WMIQ | Iron Mountain, Michigan | 64026 | C | | | 1 | 45.821111°N 88.054444°W |
| WMOH | Hamilton, Ohio | 65955 | C | | | 1 | 39.403333°N 84.530556°W |
| WMRV | Spring Lake, North Carolina | 19875 | C | 0.95 | 0.95 | | 35.186389°N 78.959722°W |
| WMVG | Milledgeville, Georgia | 73302 | C | | | 1 | 33.082778°N 83.250278°W |
| WNAT | Natchez, Mississippi | 21605 | C | | | 1 | 31.559167°N 91.391667°W |
| WNBP | Newburyport, Massachusetts | 15338 | C | | | 1 | 42.823056°N 70.861667°W |
| WNBY | Newberry, Michigan | 20378 | C | 1 | 1 | | 46.313333°N 85.510556°W |
| WNOS | New Bern, North Carolina | 54363 | C | | | 1 | 35.100833°N 77.075833°W |
| WOL | Washington, District of Columbia | 54713 | C | 0.37 | 0.37 | | 38.955278°N 77.004167°W |
| WOLY | Olean, New York | 2863 | C | 1 | 1 | | 42.0775°N 78.475556°W |
| WPGG | Atlantic City, New Jersey | 10448 | C | | | 1 | 39.378333°N 74.448056°W |
| WPHM | Port Huron, Michigan | 73075 | C | | | 1 | 42.976944°N 82.464444°W |
| WPNO | South Paris, Maine | 52176 | C | | | 1 | 44.221111°N 70.528611°W |
| WPSE | Erie, Pennsylvania | 65467 | C | 1 | 0.77 | | 42.136389°N 80.040278°W |
| WRCE | Richland Center, Wisconsin | 22793 | C | 1 | 1 | | 43.316111°N 90.3775°W |
| WREL | Lexington, Virginia | 19671 | C | | | 1 | 37.766667°N 79.432222°W |
| WRLL | Cicero, Illinois | 42068 | C | 1 | 1 | | 41.8325°N 87.705556°W |
| WROX | Clarksdale, Mississippi | 11611 | C | | | 1 | 34.211111°N 90.578333°W |
| WSDV | Sarasota, Florida | 48671 | C | | | 1 | 27.336389°N 82.573611°W |
| WSMG | Greeneville, Tennessee | 7834 | C | 0.67 | 0.67 | | 36.169444°N 82.847778°W |
| WSTU | Stuart, Florida | 74076 | C | | | 1 | 27.214722°N 80.256667°W |
| WTAL | Tallahassee, Florida | 55330 | C | 1 | 1 | | 30.427222°N 84.245278°W |
| WTBO | Cumberland, Maryland | 74082 | C | 1 | 1 | | 39.645833°N 78.752222°W |
| WTCO | Campbellsville, Kentucky | 26641 | C | | | 1 | 37.335278°N 85.375833°W |
| WTHU | Thurmont, Maryland | 10538 | C | 0.5 | 0.4 | | 39.626944°N 77.403056°W |
| WTKI | Huntsville, Alabama | 30965 | C | | | 1 | 34.725°N 86.604167°W |
| WTRO | Dyersburg, Tennessee | 57203 | C | 0.7 | 0.7 | | 36.068333°N 89.332778°W |
| WTSA | Brattleboro, Vermont | 67763 | C | | | 1 | 42.870278°N 72.559722°W |
| WVAM | Parkersburg, West Virginia | 73353 | C | 1 | 1 | | 39.3375°N 81.517778°W |
| WVLD | Valdosta, Georgia | 69647 | C | 0.86 | 0.86 | | 30.834722°N 83.299167°W |
| WVNZ | Highland Springs, Virginia | 73728 | C | | | 0.96 | 37.544167°N 77.346389°W |
| WWHK | Myrtle Beach, South Carolina | 24775 | C | 1 | 1 | | 33.705556°N 78.890278°W |
| WWJB | Brooksville, Florida | 27094 | C | 1 | 1 | | 28.550556°N 82.417222°W |
| WWRI | West Warwick, Rhode Island | 15959 | C | 1 | 1 | | 41.693889°N 71.523889°W |
| WWSC | Glens Falls, New York | 49092 | C | 1 | 0.94 | | 43.3125°N 73.598611°W |
| WXVW | Jeffersonville, Indiana | 63935 | C | 1 | 1 | | 38.294722°N 85.751944°W |
| WYNY | Milford, Pennsylvania | 161541 | C | 1 | 1 | | 41.336111°N 74.795833°W |
| WZGX | Bessemer, Alabama | 4926 | C | | | 1 | 33.423056°N 86.954722°W |
| WZKZ | Bridgeport, Connecticut | 54553 | C | | | 1 | 41.219444°N 73.202222°W |

== Uruguay ==
- CX 46 Radio América in Montevideo
