= 1510 AM =

AM radio frequency

The following radio stations broadcast on AM frequency 1510 kHz: 1510 AM is a North American (U.S.) clear-channel frequency. WLAC in Nashville, Tennessee, is the dominant Class A station on 1510 AM. KGA Spokane had been a Class A station, before it reduced its nighttime power and downgraded to Class B in 2008.

== Argentina ==
- LRI253 in Suardi, Santa Fe
- LV21 in Villa Dolores, Córdoba

== Mexico ==
- XEPBGR-AM in Guadalajara, Jalisco

== United States ==
Stations in bold are clear-channel stations.

Call sign	City of license	Facility ID	Class	Daytime power (kW)	Nighttime power (kW)	Critical hours power (kW)	Unlimited power (kW)	Transmitter coordinates
KAGC	Bryan, Texas	16983	D	0.5				30.651667°N 96.385°W
KAGY	Port Sulphur, Louisiana	43127	D	1				29.484167°N 89.704167°W
KCTE	Independence, Missouri	64637	D	10				39.070556°N 94.449444°W
KCTX	Childress, Texas	25186	D	0.25				34.428056°N 100.229722°W
KFNN	Mesa, Arizona	14382	D	22	0.1			33.692778°N 112.0025°W
KGA	Spokane, Washington	11234	B	50	15			47.502222°N 117.385°W
KIFG	Iowa Falls, Iowa	52021	D	1		0.5		42.513611°N 93.215833°W
KIRV	Fresno, California	48513	D	10				36.711667°N 119.833056°W
KLQR	Larned, Kansas	7991	D	1		0.5		38.165°N 99.101389°W
KMND	Midland, Texas	28201	D	2.4				31.963611°N 102.081389°W
KMRF	Marshfield, Missouri	48536	D	5		1.6		37.319167°N 92.961944°W
KMSD	Milbank, South Dakota	63599	D	5	0.014	1		45.194444°N 96.639167°W
KOAZ	Isleta, New Mexico	65389	D	5	0.025	4.2		34.979444°N 106.736944°W
KPLS	Littleton, Colorado	52249	B	10	25			39.868889°N 104.926944°W
KROB	Robstown, Texas	65167	D	0.5				27.7775°N 97.631944°W
KSFN	Piedmont, California	40137	B	8	2.4			37.817222°N 122.286111°W
KSPA	Ontario, California	13899	B	10	1			34.094722°N 117.612778°W
KSTV	Stephenville, Texas	9746	D	0.5				32.202222°N 98.248333°W
KTTT	Columbus, Nebraska	28148	D	0.5				41.453889°N 97.405556°W
KWJB	Canton, Texas	8545	D	0.5		0.4		32.541667°N 95.8575°W
WBSG	Lajas, Puerto Rico	53629	B				1	18.036389°N 67.082778°W
WCAZ	Macomb, Illinois	60017	D	0.33				40.408611°N 91.17°W
WEAL	Greensboro, North Carolina	49315	D	0.82		0.2		36.061667°N 79.793056°W
WGKB	Waukesha, Wisconsin	70771	D	23		20		43.017222°N 88.195278°W
WJKN	Jackson, Michigan	53291	D	0.42				42.221389°N 84.435556°W
**WLAC**	Nashville, Tennessee	34391	A	50	50			36.271944°N 86.757778°W
WLGN	Logan, Ohio	38266	D	1		0.25		39.528611°N 82.385°W
WLKR	Norwalk, Ohio	21487	D	0.5				41.279167°N 82.656389°W
WMEX	Quincy, Massachusetts	12789	D	10	0.1	2		42.273611°N 71.041667°W
WOCQ	Salem, New Jersey	52768	D	2.5				39.583333°N 75.460556°W
WPGR	Monroeville, Pennsylvania	4028	D	5	0.001	2.5		40.470278°N 79.851111°W
WQUL	Woodruff, South Carolina	29658	D	1		0.25		34.756111°N 82.055°W
WRNJ	Hackettstown, New Jersey	76913	B	2	0.23	1.1		40.816667°N 74.826389°W
WWBC	Cocoa, Florida	3071	D	50		25		28.353333°N 80.779167°W
WWHN	Joliet, Illinois	26465	D	1		0.6		41.513889°N 88.052778°W
