= KMVL =

KMVL may refer to:

- The ICAO code for Morrisville–Stowe State Airport
- KMVL (AM), a radio station (1220 AM) located in Madisonville, Texas, United States
- KMVL-FM, a radio station (100.5 FM) located in Madisonville, Texas, United States
