= KRLC =

- Lewiston, Idaho; United States
- Broadcast area: Lewiston, Idaho; Clarkston, Washington
- Frequency: 1350 kHz
- Branding: AM 1350 KRLC

Programming
- Format: Country

Ownership
- Owner: Lee and Angela McVey; (McVey Entertainment Group, LLC)
- Sister stations: KMAX; KCLX

History
- First air date: April 16, 1935 (first license granted)
- Last air date: August 31, 2023

Technical information
- Licensing authority: FCC
- Facility ID: 28216
- Class: B
- Power: 5,000 watts day; 158 watts night
- Transmitter coordinates: 46°23′34.6″N 116°59′31.6″W
- Translator: 93.1 K226CT (Lewiston)

Links
- Public license information: Public file; LMS

KRLC (1350 AM) was a radio station broadcasting a Country music format. The station was licensed to Lewiston, Idaho, and served the Clarkston, Washington,–Lewiston area. The station was owned by Lee and Angela McVey, through licensee McVey Entertainment Group, LLC.

== History ==
KRLC began broadcasting in late 1934 or early 1935. It was licensed to H.E. Studebaker.

On August 31, 2023, KRLC ceased operations due to the loss of its tower site. The studio building, which had housed the station since 1947, was then used as a training ground for the Lewiston Fire Department, and was intentionally burned down in November 2025. The Federal Communications Commission cancelled the station’s license on January 7, 2026, after failing to respond to an inquiry regarding the station's silence.
