= XEIX-AM =

Radio station in Jiquilpan, Michoacán

- Jiquilpan, Michoacán; Mexico
- Frequency: 1290 AM
- Branding: Super Éxitos

Ownership
- Owner: Promoradio; (XEIX, S.A.)
- Sister stations: XERNB-AM

History
- First air date: June 22, 1965

Technical information
- Class: C
- Power: 1,000 watts day/500 watts night

Links
- Webcast: Listen live
- Website: promoradio.com.mx/superexitos-1290

XEIX-AM is a radio station on 1290 AM in Jiquilpan, Michoacán. It is owned by Promoradio and known as Super Éxitos.

== History ==
XEIX received its concession on June 22, 1965. It was owned by José Luis Lemus Orozco.

It is the sister station to a station located in Sahuayo, Michoacán, XERNB-AM broadcasting on 1450 AM.
