= KKXX =

KKXX may refer to:

- KKXX-FM, a radio station (93.1 FM) licensed to Shafter, California, United States
- KKXX (AM), a radio station (930 AM) licensed to Paradise, California, United States
- KKXX (amino acid sequence), a sequence in the amino acid structure of a protein which keeps it from secreting from the ER
