= KYIX =

Air 1 station in Chico, California

- South Oroville, California; United States
- Broadcast area: Chico, California
- Frequency: 104.9 MHz (HD Radio)
- Branding: Air1

Programming
- Format: Christian worship
- Subchannels: HD2: K-Love; HD3: The Valley's 105.7 (Adult contemporary); HD4: KKXX simulcast
- Affiliations: Air1

Ownership
- Owner: Butte Broadcasting Company, Inc.
- Sister stations: KKXX

History
- First air date: February 1, 1994

Technical information
- Licensing authority: FCC
- Facility ID: 7914
- Class: A
- ERP: 260 watts
- HAAT: 472 meters
- Transmitter coordinates: 39°39′4.00″N 121°27′43.00″W
- Translators: HD2: 104.5 K283AR (Chico); HD3: 105.7 K289CH (Chico)

Links
- Public license information: Public file; LMS
- Webcast: Listen Live
- Website: Air 1 K-Love (HD2); The Valley's 105.7 (HD3)

KYIX (104.9 FM) is a repeater station for the Air1 Radio Network based in Chico, California and licensed to South Oroville, California. It is owned by Butte Broadcasting Company, Inc., which owns and operates sister station KKXX.

== Brief history ==
KYIX was originally a locally-run Christian station managed by Ron and Sarah Warkentin, later Randy and Monica Zachary of Reality Radio Ministries and was known as Reality Radio Y105. It then became a part of the Radio U network before being picked up by Air 1.

== HD Radio ==
On January 29, 2025, KYIX's HD3 subchannel changed their format from oldies to hot adult contemporary, branded as "105.7 The Mountain". The station is being programmed by Robert Paul and managed by Rob Austin of JamTraxx Media / RadioMixes / Fusion Radio fame.

On October 3, 2025 at 4 pm, KYIX-HD3 dropped its hot adult contemporary format and began stunting as "Meow 105.7", towards a new format to launch on Wednesday, October 8 at 12 pm.

On October 8, 2025 at 12 pm, KYIX-HD3 ended stunting and launched an adult contemporary format, branded as "The Valley's 105.7".
