= KIQQ =

KIQQ may refer to:

- KIQQ-FM, a radio station (103.7 FM) licensed to Newberry Springs, California, United States
- KKZI, a radio station (1310 AM) licensed to Barstow, California, which held the call sign KIQQ from 1990 to 2021
