= KIJN =

KIJN may refer to:

- KIJN (AM), a radio station (1060 AM) licensed to Farwell, Texas, United States
- KIJN-FM, a radio station (92.3 FM) licensed to Farwell, Texas, United States
