= KOFM =

KOFM may refer to:

- KOFM (FM), a radio station (103.1 FM) licensed to Enid, Oklahoma, United States
- Triple M Newcastle, a radio station (102.9 FM) in Newcastle, New South Wales, Australia formerly branded as KOFM
