= KKAD =

KKAD may refer to:

- KKAD (TV), a television station (channel 10) licensed to serve Silver City, New Mexico, United States; see List of television stations in New Mexico
- KKOV, a radio station (1550 AM) licensed to serve Vancouver, Washington, United States, which used the KKAD call sign from 2003 to 2011
