= Star Radio Network =

Star Radio Network (also known as Hunt Broadcasting) is a series of radio stations in Texas and Louisiana. It is owned by Leon Hunt.

== Radio affiliates ==
Radio affiliates for Star Radio Network are KIVY licensed in Crockett, Texas and KMVL licensed in Madisonville, Texas.
