= KKAN =

KKAN may refer to:

- KKAN (AM), a radio station (1490 AM) licensed to serve Phillipsburg, Kansas, United States
- KKAN-FM, a defunct radio station (95.3 FM) formerly licensed to serve Phillipsburg, Kansas
