= KMAX =

KMAX or Kmax may refer to:

- KMAX (AM), a radio station (840 AM) licensed to Colfax, Washington, United States
- KMAX-FM, a radio station (94.3 FM) licensed to Wellington, Colorado, United States
- KMAX-TV, a television station (channel 21, virtual 31) licensed to Sacramento, California, United States
- KSSE, a radio station (107.1 FM) licensed to Arcadia, California, United States, which used the call sign KMAX from 1960 to 1996
- KGMZ-FM, a radio station (95.7 FM) licensed to San Francisco, California, United States, which used the call sign KMAX-FM from April 2006 to March 2007
- Kaman K-MAX helicopter
- KMAX, the stage name of dc Talk member and solo artist Kevin Max
