= KIRV =

Radio station in Fresno, California

- Fresno, California; United States
- Broadcast area: Fresno
- Frequency: 1510 kHz
- Branding: Radio Vida Abundante

Programming
- Language: Spanish
- Format: Christian radio

Ownership
- Owner: Centro Cristiano Viva Abundante, Inc.
- Sister stations: KJDJ, KDBV

History
- First air date: August 1962
- Call sign meaning: Original owner Irving E. Penberthy

Technical information
- Licensing authority: FCC
- Facility ID: 48513
- Class: D
- Power: 10,000 watts (days only)
- Transmitter coordinates: 36°42′41.8″N 119°50′2.5″W

Links
- Public license information: Public file; LMS
- Website: radiovidaabundante.com

KIRV (1510 AM) is a commercial radio station licensed to Fresno, California, United States, and serving the Fresno area during the daytime hours only. The station is owned by Centro Cristiano Viva Abundante, Inc. and carries a Spanish-language Christian radio format branded as "Radio Vida Abundante".

KIRV must sign off the air at sunset, a requirement originally instituted to protect the signal of KGA in Spokane, Washington, the former Class A clear channel station on 1510 kHz.

== History ==
Former station logo

The Federal Communications Commission authorized the granting of a construction permit for a new radio station on 1510 kHz in Fresno to Irving E. Penberthy on October 31, 1961. Penberthy was a Baptist minister, but while plans were initially announced for the station to specialize in religious programs, this was changed before broadcasting began in August 1962.

At the end of 1965, Penberthy reached a deal to sell KIRV to general manager Robert Eurich. Eurich owned the station until New Life Enterprises acquired it in 1974. One of the partners in New Life was Jim Patterson, who later became mayor of Fresno between 1993 and 2001. Patterson was a second-generation broadcaster; he had previously been employed at KBIF, which was owned by his father Norwood until he lost ownership of it in a tax case. Norwood was also involved with Visalia's KICU-TV. Patterson, who was joined by Dan Jantz and Dennis Klassen in the partnership, frequently aired his conservative political views on KIRV programs. The station lost $400 in its first full year as a Christian outlet but made $44,000 of revenue by 1980.

The 500-watt station upgraded to its present 10,000 watts after the construction of two new towers in the antenna array was approved in 1979.

Though not active in management in the later years, Patterson continued to own KIRV until 1999, when it was sold to Gore-Overgaard Broadcasting. Gore-Overgaard sold KIRV to current owner Centro Cristiano Vida Abundante in December 2012 for $600,000.
