= KLCB =

Libby, Montana; United States
- Broadcast area: Kootenai Valley
- Frequency: 1230 kHz

Programming
- Format: Country

Ownership
- Owner: Northwest Capital Corporation
- Sister stations: KTNY

History
- First air date: December 23, 1950
- Former call signs: KLCB (1950–1958); KOLL (1958–1960)
- Call sign meaning: Lincoln County Broadcasters

Technical information
- Licensing authority: FCC
- Facility ID: 37526
- Class: C
- Power: 1,000 watts (unlimited)
- Transmitter coordinates: 48°22′13.8″N 115°32′22.6″W

Links
- Public license information: Public file; LMS

KLCB (1230 AM) is a radio station licensed to serve Libby, Montana. The station is owned by Northwest Capital Corporation. It most recently aired a country music format. Its transmitter site is the same as KTNY's, south of town on Spencer Road.

KLCB went on the air in 1950. It became KOLL in 1958 after Lincoln County Broadcasters sold the station; the company retook KOLL in 1960 after not being paid the full purchase price, and restored the KLCB call sign. It, along with KTNY, ceased operations at the start of 2025.

== History ==
Lincoln County Broadcasters was granted a construction permit for a new station on 1230 kHz in Libby on August 17, 1950. Principals in the company included Oliver G. and Mary Elizabeth Coburn, co-owners of Coburn Electronics; Rogan Jones, president of KVOS in Bellingham and KPQ in Wenatchee, Washington; and James W. Wallace, vice president and general manager of KPQ. The station, assigned the call sign KLCB, signed on December 23, 1950. By 1954, the Coburns shared ownership of the station with William F. and Agnes Hafferman; that April, KLCB became the ninth affiliate of the West Radio network, which also included KSPO in Spokane, Washington; KRLC in Lewiston, Idaho; and KSPT in Sandpoint, Idaho.

In 1957, Lincoln County Broadcasters sold KLCB to Frank Reardon, who had stakes in KBOW in Butte and KGEZ in Kalispell, for $19,000. That May, the station became one of four previously-independent stations approved to join the Mutual Broadcasting System effective June 2, along with KSET in El Paso, Texas; WFOX in Milwaukee, Wisconsin; and KRES in St. Joseph, Missouri. KLCB also affiliated with the Keystone Broadcasting System. Reardon sold KLCB to Robert R. Rigler, the station's manager, for $25,000 in 1958; Rigler changed the call sign to KOLL on October 13. Ownership of the station was returned to Lincoln County Broadcasters, which had not received its full purchase price, in 1960; the KLCB call sign returned on March 14. By this point, Oliver G. Coburn—who in the interim had been the owner of KVNA in Flagstaff, Arizona—had an 80.4-percent majority interest in the company; he had become the majority owner after the death of Mary Elizabeth Coburn in 1956. In the early 1960s, KLCB's programming included big bands, symphonies, military marches, a half-hour "Teen Time" rock and roll program, and transcription discs of Radio Nederland programming.

Oliver G. Coburn, William G. Hafferman, and Ambrose G. Measure sold Lincoln County Broadcasters to Frank E. and Georgia M. Krshka, Eileen A. and Frank A. Whetstone, Earl D. Lovick, Albert H. Uithof, J. F. Fennessy Jr., and David W. Robinson for $47,500 in 1966. By this point, KLCB was an affiliate of the ABC Radio Network. By 1975, it was a middle of the road station carrying the ABC Information Network; by 1978, KLCB's playlist was a blend of soft adult contemporary and country music. It was a full-time country station by 1989. An FM sister station, KTNY (101.7), went on the air in 1986. In later years, the station was owned by Duane and Peggy Williams; Duane Williams had been the station's general manager since February 1977, while Peggy Williams became the mayor of Libby in 2021.

KLCB and KTNY were closed by Lincoln County Broadcasters on January 1, 2025; their licenses were returned to the Federal Communications Commission (FCC). The FCC cancelled KLCB’s license on January 15, 2025. The licenses were subsequently reinstated, with Lincoln County Broadcasters instead requesting silent authority that February. In July 2025, Lincoln County Broadcasters agreed to sell KLCB to Roger Lonnquist's Northwest Capital Corporation for $10,000. KTNY was concurrently sold to Hi-Line Radio Fellowship (which is run by Lonnquist) for $30,000.

== Programming ==
In addition to its usual music programming, KLCB carried national and local news, a swap and shop program, plus Libby Loggers football and men's and women's basketball games.
