= XERNB-AM =

Radio station in Sahuayo, Michoacán

- Sahuayo, Michoacán; Mexico
- Frequency: 1450 AM
- Branding: Radio Impacto

Programming
- Format: Regional Mexican

Ownership
- Owner: Promoradio; (José Raúl Nava Becerra)
- Sister stations: XEIX-AM

History
- First air date: March 13, 1948
- Former call signs: XEGC-AM
- Call sign meaning: José Raúl Nava Becerra

Technical information
- Class: C
- Power: 1,000 watts

Links
- Webcast: Listen live
- Website: promoradio.com.mx

XERNB-AM is a radio station on 1450 AM in Sahuayo, Michoacán. It is owned by Promoradio and known as Radio Impacto and carries a Regional Mexican format.

== History ==
XERNB-AM logo until 2019

XEGC-AM received its concession on March 13, 1948. It was owned by Alberto Barragán Degollado and sold to José Raúl Nava Becerra in 1982. The callsign was later changed to XERNB-AM in the early 2000s.

It is the sister station to a radio station located in Jiquilpan, Michoacán, XEIX-AM broadcasting on 1290 AM.
