= KBIF =

Radio station in Fresno, California

- Fresno, California; United States
- Broadcast area: Fresno metropolitan area
- Frequency: 900 kHz
- Branding: KBIF 900 AM

Programming
- Languages: Hmong, Hindi, Punjabi and Urdu
- Format: Full-service

Ownership
- Owner: Punjabi American Media LLC

History
- First air date: September 8, 1947
- Former call signs: KSGN (1947–1951); KSJV (1951–1953)

Technical information
- Licensing authority: FCC
- Facility ID: 9226
- Class: B
- Power: 1,000 watts (day); 500 watts (night)
- Transmitter coordinates: 36°41′29.8″N 119°40′49.5″W

Links
- Public license information: Public file; LMS
- Webcast: Listen live
- Website: 900hmongradio.com (Hmong); 900kbif.com (Punjabi)

KBIF (900 AM) is a commercial radio station licensed to Fresno, California, United States, and serving the Fresno metropolitan area. Owned by Punjabi American Media LLC., KBIF airs a format of talk, music and news in Hmong, Hindi, Punjabi and Urdu, and also features a service known as "Hindi Bollywood Spice Radio" on weekends. KBIF's transmitter is sited to the southeast of Fresno.

== History ==
=== Early years ===
The Radio Sanger Company, formed by four prominent local farmers, was granted a construction permit by the Federal Communications Commission (FCC) on March 12, 1947, to build a 1,000-watt, daytime-only radio station to serve nearby Sanger on 900 kHz. The station was constructed at Centerville. KSGN signed on September 8, 1947.

The station was sold for the first time in 1950 to a group led by Earl J. Fenston, a Fresno attorney; by this time, it had established satellite studios at Fresno's Sequoia Hotel. KSGN became KSJV on Easter Sunday 1951, a decision undertaken to reduce confusion with other local stations with similar call signs. Fenston expanded his media holdings when he bought The Hanford Sentinel and KNGS radio in Hanford in 1952. The FCC granted the Hanford radio station's sale on the condition that Fenston divest himself of KSJV in Sanger, prompting him to sell it to his son.

=== Poole years ===
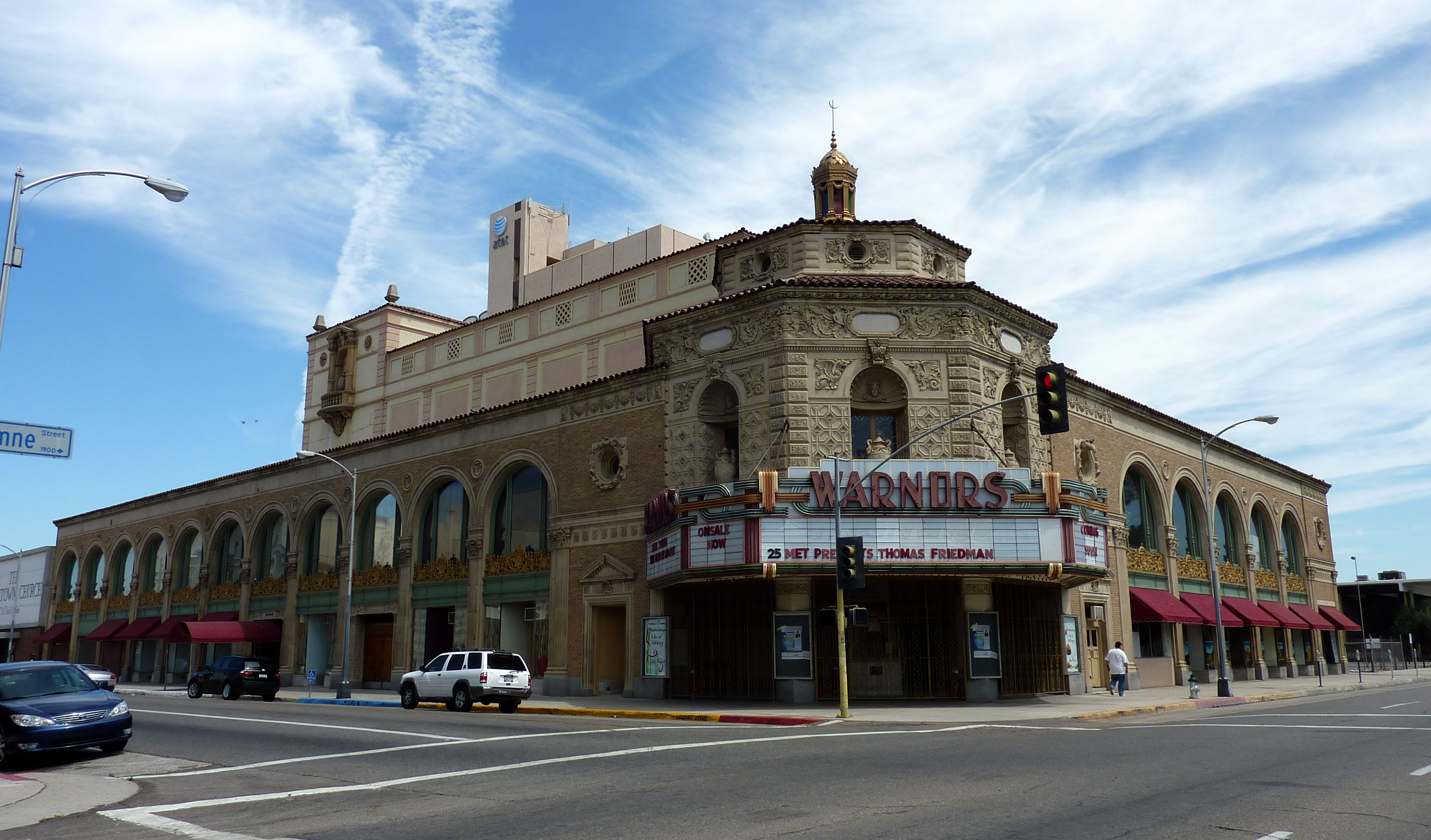
The Warner (now Warnors) Theatre in Fresno housed KBIF's offices in the first year after John Poole bought the station

In the end, the Fenstons decided to sell KSJV outright to another interest: John H. Poole, who owned radio station KBIG in Los Angeles and had already applied to start a television station on channel 53 in Fresno. Foreign-language programs were removed from the schedule, and KBIG changed its call letters to KBIF at the start of April 1953, after having received permission two months prior. The station also moved all offices from Centerville to Fresno in the Warner Theatre and then to another site in town.

Poole sought to move KBIF closer to Fresno and secured approval to have the community of license changed accordingly, even as Poole's Fresno TV station, KBID, lasted just five months after failing to secure a network affiliation. The move was completed in December 1954, when KBIF's new transmitter at North and Fowler avenues was activated and the station relocated its studios to the Hotel Californian.

Poole divested a majority stake in KBIF in 1957 to David Harris and Ethan Bernstein, two employees of Fresno station KMJ; Bernstein then bought out Harris two years later.

=== Norwood Patterson ownership ===
Bernstein and Poole sold KBIF in 1961 to Norwood Patterson, who owned San Francisco's KSAN radio. The sale reunited KBIF with a planned television station, as Patterson held a construction permit for KICU-TV, a new television station to be licensed to Visalia. Once the sale closed in February 1962, it also brought a change in programming to religious fare. The new manager was Norwood's brother-in-law Richard Bott, who months later moved to Kansas City and started what became the Bott Radio Network.

In later years, Norwood's son, Norwood "Jim" Patterson, Jr., became KBIF's manager. However, his father committed a crime that would ultimately lead to a change in control. Beginning in 1965, Patterson withheld taxes from his employees without depositing the money into a trust, as required by law; according to the indictment, he owed the federal government $141,000 in taxes and penalties, He was convicted on 16 charges the next year and, after two attempted appeals, served a 10-month jail sentence beginning in 1973.

=== Cascade and Overgaard ===
As a result of the jail sentence and financial woes, KBIF was placed into receivership in 1973. The transfer caused Jim Patterson to lose his job at KBIF; in 1975, he would buy KIRV and relaunch it as a Christian station, later becoming a two-term mayor of Fresno and member of the California State Assembly.

Cascade Broadcasting Corporation acquired KBIF in 1975, two years after the receivership began. Cascade, based in Portland, also owned a Christian station in New Orleans and a Spanish-language station in San Jose; in 1986, KBIF began broadcasting after sunset for the first time. Programs for specific ethnic groups became more prevalent on the Christian station's schedule. The first Punjabi shows began airing in 1987; in the early 1990s, programs in Hmong began on KBIF, serving a community that had grown to 56,000 people by 2001. The station developed an eclectic lineup of brokered religious and ethnic talk programs.

In 1997, Cascade sold KBIF to Gore-Overgaard Broadcasting. The new owners continued and expanded the ethnic formats, with all weekend hours given over to Punjabi, Hindi Urdu output in 2003.

In July 2024, Overgaard Broadcasting sold KBIF to Punjabi American Media. Harjot Khalsa and Balwinder Kaur Khalsa acquired the station’s tower site.
