= 1060 AM =

AM radio frequency

The following radio stations broadcast on AM frequency 1060 kHz: 1060 AM is a United States and Mexican clear-channel frequency. KYW Philadelphia and XECPAE Mexico City share Class A status on 1060 kHz.

== Canada ==
- CKMX in Calgary, Alberta - 50 kW, transmitter located at 50.9006°N 113.875°W

== Cuba ==
- CMGW - Radio 26 in Matanzas.

== Guatemala (Channel 53) ==
- TGXA in Guatemala

== Mexico ==
Stations in bold are clear-channel stations.

- **XECPAE** in Mexico City (Ejército de Oriente, District Federal) - 100 kW daytime, 20 kW nighttime, transmitter located at 19.363972°N 99.027194°W
- XERDO-AM in Brecha 73, Tamaulipas

== United States ==
Stations in bold are clear-channel stations.

Call sign	City of license	Facility ID	Class	Daytime power (kW)	Nighttime power (kW)	Critical hours power (kW)	Unlimited power (kW)	Transmitter coordinates
KBFL	Springfield, Missouri	17022	D	0.47	0.019			37.225833°N 93.359167°W
KBGN	Caldwell, Idaho	48249	D	10				43.720278°N 116.532778°W
KDUS	Tempe, Arizona	65165	B	5	0.5			33.361944°N 111.9675°W
KDYL	South Salt Lake, Utah	27458	D	10	0.149			40.535556°N 112.077222°W
KFIL	Preston, Minnesota	34429	D	1				43.680556°N 92.141667°W
KFOY	Sparks, Nevada	160030	B	5	0.5			39.573611°N 119.846667°W
KGFX	Pierre, South Dakota	30209	B	10	1			44.286667°N 100.338333°W
KIPA	Hilo, Hawaii	33324	D	1				19.696667°N 155.051389°W
KKVV	Las Vegas, Nevada	36642	D	5	0.043			36.156111°N 115.258889°W
KNLV	Ord, Nebraska	35247	D	1	0.023			41.571389°N 98.9225°W
KRCN	Longmont, Colorado	70625	D	50	0.111			40.280833°N 104.940278°W (daytime); 40.191111°N 105.126389°W (nighttime)
KTNS	Oakhurst, California	8338	D	5	0.023			37.296111°N 119.606389°W
KTSN	Lockhart, Texas	34430	D	2				30.320278°N 97.649722°W
**KYW**	Philadelphia, Pennsylvania	25441	A				50	40.103333°N 75.248889°W
WCGB	Juana Diaz, Puerto Rico	24708	B	5	0.5			17.991111°N 66.475556°W
WCOK	Sparta, North Carolina	61680	D	1.1				36.481944°N 81.093056°W
WHFB	Benton Harbor-St. Joseph, Michigan	72174	D	3	0.0013	2.5		42.078889°N 86.466667°W (daytime and nighttime); 42.078889°N 86.466944°W (critical hours)
WILB	Canton, Ohio	2649	D	15		15		40.834167°N 81.43°W
WIXC	Titusville, Florida	54505	B	50	5	17		28.663056°N 80.921389°W
WJKY	Jamestown, Kentucky	36304	D	1				37.025278°N 85.073056°W
WKMQ	Tupelo, Mississippi	68351	D	0.96	0.012			34.255°N 88.69°W
WKNG	Tallapoosa, Georgia	73183	D	15		5		33.735°N 85.252222°W
WMCL	McLeansboro, Illinois	15478	D	2.5	0.002			38.104444°N 88.563333°W
WNPC	Newport, Tennessee	70636	D	1				35.986111°N 83.179444°W
WQMV	Waverly, Tennessee	41866	D	1	0.004			36.0875°N 87.855°W
WQOM	Natick, Massachusetts	21109	B	50	2.5			42.247222°N 71.425278°W
WRHL	Rochelle, Illinois	57268	D	0.25	0.05			41.923333°N 89.058333°W
WXNC	Monroe, North Carolina	57451	D	4		2.4		34.987778°N 80.518056°W
