= WMCL =

- McLeansboro, Illinois; United States
- Frequency: 1060 kHz
- Branding: WMCL 1060am & 107.9fm

Programming
- Format: Silent

Ownership
- Owner: Dana Communications Corporation

History
- First air date: January 26, 1968

Technical information
- Licensing authority: FCC
- Facility ID: 15478
- Class: D
- Power: 2,500 watts day 2 watts night
- Transmitter coordinates: 38°06′16.17263″N 88°33′48.19118″W
- Translators: 94.5 MHz (W233CY, Mount Vernon); 107.9 MHz (W300BD)

Links
- Public license information: Public file; LMS

WMCL (1060 AM) is a radio station licensed to McLeansboro, Illinois, United States. Originally signed on in 1968 as a 250 watt daytime only station owned by Hamilton County Broadcasting, the station's power was increased to 2500 watts during daylight hours in 1980. WMCL's current owner is Dana Communications Corporation. A rare example of an AM station which uses both masts in daylight and sends the tiny night signal omnidrectionally through one mast.

1060 AM is a United States and Mexican clear-channel frequency, which requires WMCL to use a lower power after sunset.

On June 1, 2026, the station went off the air along with some of its sister stations as part of a reorganization effort by the owner.

Former Logo
