= KQTE =

Coordinates: 34°45′59.9″N 117°14′51.2″W

- Helendale, California; United States
- Broadcast area: Victor Valley
- Frequency: 1450 kHz
- Branding: ESPN Victor Valley 101.5 & 1450

Programming
- Format: Sports
- Affiliations: ESPN Radio

Ownership
- Owner: Jeff Chang
- Sister stations: KKZI

History
- First air date: June 2011

Technical information
- Licensing authority: FCC
- Facility ID: 160413
- Class: C
- Power: 760 watts
- Translator: 101.5 K268DU (Victorville)

Links
- Public license information: Public file; LMS

KQTE (1450 AM) is a commercial radio station licensed to Helendale, California, United States, and serving the Victor Valley. It has a sports format with most programming from ESPN Radio. It is owned by Jeff Chang, who also owns television stations in California and Colorado, as well as KKZI 1310 AM in Barstow.

KQTE is also heard on 10-watt FM translator K268DU at 101.5 MHz in Victorville.

== History ==
The station signed on the air in June 2011. It was launched by Dr. Charles W. Love. It originally aired an oldies and classic country format.

Charles Love died March 9, 2016, and the license was transferred to his wife, Deanna Love. On February 1, 2017, KQTE went silent.

The station was subsequently sold to Jeff Chang. Chang also owns and operates television stations in California (San Francisco and Monterey) and Colorado (Grand Junction). The station resumed broadcasting in February 2018, and flipped to all-sports from ESPN Radio on March 1, 2018.
