= KTNY =

Libby, Montana; United States
- Broadcast area: Kootenai Valley
- Frequency: 101.7 MHz

Programming
- Format: Christian
- Affiliations: Your Network of Praise

Ownership
- Owner: Hi-Line Radio Fellowship
- Sister stations: KLCB

History
- First air date: April 6, 1986
- Former call signs: KVAD (CP, 1984–1985)
- Call sign meaning: Kootenay, Canadian spelling of Kootenai, for the forest, river, and valley's name

Technical information
- Licensing authority: FCC
- Facility ID: 37524
- Class: A
- ERP: 3,000 watts
- HAAT: −310 meters (−1,020 ft)
- Transmitter coordinates: 48°22′13.8″N 115°32′22.5″W

Links
- Public license information: Public file; LMS
- Webcast: Listen Live
- Website: ynop.org

KTNY (101.7 FM) is a Christian radio station licensed to serve Libby, Montana. The station is owned by Hi-Line Radio Fellowship. It previously aired a soft oldies music format.

KTNY signed on in 1986 with an easy listening format, which over time would evolve into the soft oldies format.

== History ==
Lincoln County Broadcasters, owner of KLCB, applied for a new station on 101.7 MHz in Libby on April 20, 1983. The station was assigned call sign KVAD on December 3, 1984, which was changed to KTNY on January 16, 1985. The call sign refers to Kootenay, the Canadian spelling of Kootenai, the name of the Native American tribe of the area; the Kootenai River and the Kootenai National Forest are also named for the tribe.

KTNY went on the air April 6, 1986, with an adult easy listening format and an affiliation with the ABC Entertainment Network. By 1992, the format had shifted to middle of the road (MOR); by 1995, it was a blend of MOR, adult contemporary, and oldies. In later years, KTNY had a soft oldies format, which the station called "Smooth Oldies Soft Gold".

KTNY and KLCB were closed by Lincoln County Broadcasters on January 1, 2025; their licenses were returned to the Federal Communications Commission (FCC). The licenses were subsequently reinstated, with Lincoln County Broadcasters instead requesting silent authority that February. In July 2025, Lincoln County Broadcasters agreed to sell KTNY to Hi-Line Radio Fellowship, operator of Your Network of Praise for $30,000, while KLCB was concurrently sold to Northwest Capital Corporation (whose principal, Roger Lonnquist, runs Hi-Line Radio Fellowship) for $10,000.
