= KIVY-FM =

Radio station in Crockett, Texas

- Crockett, Texas; United States
- Broadcast area: Huntsville, Lufkin, Palestine
- Frequency: 92.7 MHz
- Branding: Country 92.7 FM

Programming
- Format: Country
- Affiliations: Citadel Media, Dial Global

Ownership
- Owner: Star Radio Network
- Sister stations: KMVL-FM, KMVL, KIVY

History
- First air date: April 1, 1980

Technical information
- Licensing authority: FCC
- Facility ID: 15132
- Class: C2
- ERP: 50,000 watts
- HAAT: 150 meters (490 ft)
- Transmitter coordinates: 31°18′20″N 95°27′6″W

Links
- Public license information: Public file; LMS

KIVY-FM (92.7 FM, "Country 92.7 FM") is a radio station broadcasting a country music format. Licensed to Crockett, Texas, United States, the station serves the areas of Huntsville, Lufkin, Trinity and Palestine. The station is currently owned by Leon Hunt and features programming from Citadel Media and Dial Global.
