= KIVY (AM) =

- Crockett, Texas; United States
- Broadcast area: Jacksonville-Palestine
- Frequency: 1290 kHz
- Branding: 1290 AM 102.9 & 105.5 FM KIVY

Programming
- Format: Adult standards

Ownership
- Owner: Star Radio Network
- Sister stations: KIVY-FM, KMVL-FM, KMVL

History
- First air date: November 11, 1949

Technical information
- Licensing authority: FCC
- Facility ID: 66253
- Class: B
- Power: 2,500 watts day 175 watts night
- Transmitter coordinates: 31°18′20″N 95°27′6″W
- Translator: See § Translator

Links
- Public license information: Public file; LMS
- Website: kivy.com

KIVY, K275AS, & K288HF (1290 AM, 102.9 & 105.5 FM) is an AM radio station combined with dual FM translators broadcasting an adult standards format to the rural communities of southern Anderson and most of Houston County, Texas, including Crockett, Latexo, Grapeland, and Elkhart. Licensed to Crockett, Texas, United States, the station serves the Jacksonville-Palestine area. The station is currently owned by Leon Hunt.

Current ESPN announcer Carter Blackburn began his broadcast career at KIVY, calling high school football games.

== Translators ==
Broadcast translators for KIVY
Call sign	Frequency	City of license	FID	ERP (W)	HAAT	Class	Transmitter coordinates	FCC info	Notes
K275AS	102.9 FM	Crockett, Texas	150797	250	132 m (433 ft)	D	31°18′20″N 95°27′6″W	LMS	First air date: July 1, 2004
K288HF	105.5 FM	Crockett, Texas	203166	250	39 m (128 ft)	D	31°30′6.3″N 95°28′52.9″W	LMS	First air date: January 28, 2021
