= KJDJ =

Radio station in San Luis Obispo, California

- San Luis Obispo, California; United States
- Frequency: 1030 kHz
- Branding: Radio Vida Abundante

Programming
- Language: Spanish
- Format: Christian radio

Ownership
- Owner: Centro Cristiano Viva Abundante, Inc.
- Sister stations: KIRV

History
- First air date: February 8, 1988

Technical information
- Licensing authority: FCC
- Facility ID: 29795
- Class: B
- Power: 2,500 watts (day); 700 watts (night)
- Transmitter coordinates: 35°17′57.9″N 120°40′27.6″W

Links
- Public license information: Public file; LMS
- Website: radiovidaabundante.com

KJDJ is a radio station in San Luis Obispo, California, United States, broadcasting on 1030 AM. It is owned by Centro Cristiano Vida Abundante and is one of three California radio stations that broadcast its Radio Vida Abundante programming with a Spanish-language Christian radio format.

== History ==
KJDJ began broadcasting February 8, 1988. The station was known as "1030 News Radio" and aired sporting events of the Cal Poly Mustangs.

KJDJ was sold in November 1992 to Jaime Bonilla Valdez, then-owner of KURS (1040 AM) in San Diego and future Governor of Baja California, Mexico, for $155,000. Bonilla then sold 30 percent to minority owners of that station. The new ownership changed KJDJ to a Spanish-language format. In 1995, KJDJ began to simulcast KRQK in Lompoc, and it changed in 1998 to Spanish-language talk from Radio Única.

In 2001, Bonilla leased KJDJ out to Radio Vida Abundante. Centro Cristiano Vida Abundante acquired KJDJ outright in 2007 for $652,000.
