= KDBV =

Radio station in Salinas, California

- Salinas, California; United States
- Broadcast area: Salinas–Santa Cruz
- Frequency: 980 kHz

Programming
- Network: Radio Vida Abundante

Ownership
- Owner: Centro Cristiano Vida Abundante

History
- First air date: July 17, 1963
- Last air date: August 2, 2022
- Former call signs: KCTY (1963–2001)

Technical information
- Facility ID: 33755
- Class: B
- Power: 10,000 watts
- Transmitter coordinates: 36°43′58″N 121°35′32″W

KDBV (980 AM) was a radio station in Salinas, California, United States. It was owned by Centro Cristiano Vida Abundante and aired Spanish-language Christian programming from its Radio Vida Abundante service.

== History ==
Allen C. Bigham, Jr., received a construction permit for a new daytime-only radio station to broadcast in Salinas on August 28, 1962. Bigham had previously been a disc jockey for KDON in Salinas under the name "Johnny Dark". Programming began on July 17, 1963, with Bigham itself as one of the air staff. The original call letters were KCTY, and the station called itself "The Sound of Your City".

The new radio station faced an existential threat just three years after signing on when the Federal Communications Commission (FCC) designated its license renewal for hearing for violations including an unauthorized transfer of control, illegal broadcast of a lottery, and falsifying logs. In late 1967, hearing examiner Basil Cooper proposed renewal of the license for a short term of one year and a $10,000 fine against KCTY, then its statutory maximum. Cooper admonished Bigham for his "cavalier attitude of assuming everything is all right [at the station] while he stayed in bed", with either him or his engineer at times being too lazy to sign the station on each day.

After the short-term license renewal was granted, Bigham sold KCTY to JECO, a company controlled by James E. Coyle, for $256,000. Coyle specialized in Spanish-language media and had been involved with two Spanish-language radio stations in the Los Angeles area—a good fit for KCTY, which had now become a Spanish-language station. Coyle grew the operation by buying the inoperative KERR-FM 103.9, which had been silent in 1973, and returning it to the air as KCTY-FM, which soon after became KRAY-FM. KCTY played more traditional music than the FM station, and it was also successful in the general market owing to the large Hispanic population in the area: in the fall of 1979, it was the second-rated station in the Arbitron market.

Both stations were hit in 1980 by a strike among disc jockeys that started when Frances Graciela Chávez, known on air as "Chela", was fired by management for allegedly hoarding some of KCTY-KRAY's record library. Six of nine DJs walked out, and finding replacements proved difficult. Even general manager Marty Kline, who was not a fluent Spanish speaker, was pressed into service to spin records on the late night shift. In an interview published in The Salinas Californian, Kline made negative comments about the United Farm Workers union that led to secretaries joining the walkout and a retraction of the statements.

Coyle sold ownership stakes in his broadcast interests to R & B Management Services and Robert L. Williams in the 1970s; by 1978, just Williams and Coyle were owners. Williams continued to own KCTY and KRAY, along with later startup KLXM, which were sold as a unit to Z Spanish Radio Network in 1999 for $4.5 million. Most of Z Spanish was purchased by Entravision Communications, but the Central California properties went to Wolfhouse Radio Group Inc., headed by Héctor Villalobos, in 2001 for $5.75 million; the call letters were changed to KDBV. Centro Cristiano Vida Abundante acquired the station in 2004.

The station went silent on August 2, 2022, due to repeated failure of its transmitter. The license was then surrendered on July 6, 2023, and cancelled by the FCC on July 7.
