= KOKO (AM) =

- Warrensburg, Missouri; United States
- Broadcast area: Johnson County, Missouri
- Frequency: 1450 kHz
- Branding: Good Time Oldies 1450

Programming
- Language: English
- Format: Full service oldies
- Affiliations: Fox News Radio; Westwood One

Ownership
- Owner: D&H Media LLC

History
- First air date: December 1953; 72 years ago

Technical information
- Licensing authority: FCC
- Facility ID: 31890
- Class: C
- Power: 1,000 watts (unlimited)
- Transmitter coordinates: 38°46′32″N 93°43′12″W
- Translator: 92.1 K221GY (Warrensburg)

Links
- Public license information: Public file; LMS
- Webcast: Listen Live
- Website: warrensburgradio.com

KOKO (1450 AM, "Good Time Oldies 1450") is an American radio station licensed to serve the community of Warrensburg, the county seat of Johnson County, Missouri. The station's broadcast license is held by D&H Media LLC.

KOKO broadcasts a full service oldies music format branded "Good Time Oldies 1450". In addition to music, KOKO broadcasts national, regional, and local news, plus local sports and weather information.

The station was assigned the call sign "KOKO" by the Federal Communications Commission (FCC). It signed on in December 1953.

Marion Woods (known as "Woody") has been a host on KOKO since 1966, and still broadcasts today. Along the way, Woody was selected Billboard Magazine Small Market MOR Air Personality of the year in 1974.

KOKO was the first radio station that radio host Erich "Mancow" Muller worked at, beginning in 1985. Growing from overnight board operator up to host of his own show, Erich learned his art, and exhibited his fearless persona. One example is when he reported a "story" that the Johnson County government had sold the Old Drum statue, currently out front of the courthouse, to actor Paul Newman, who was filming in the area. A general uproar occurred before it was truthfully reported that the statue was not for sale. Erich went on to host popular morning shows in Monterey, San Francisco and Chicago.
