= WJPA =

Coordinates: 40°11′23″N 80°14′02″W

WJPA and WJPA-FM

Washington, Pennsylvania; United States
- Broadcast area: Pittsburgh metropolitan area
- Frequencies: WJPA: 1450 kHz; WJPA-FM: 95.3 MHz
- Branding: 95.3 WJPA

Programming
- Format: Classic hits
- Affiliations: Radio PA; Pittsburgh Steelers Radio Network; Westwood One Sports

Ownership
- Owner: Washington Broadcasting Company

History
- First air date: WJPA: February 1, 1941; WJPA-FM: 1964
- Call sign meaning: Washington and Jefferson, Pennsylvania

Technical information
- Licensing authority: FCC
- Facility ID: WJPA: 70947; WJPA-FM: 70944
- Class: WJPA: C; WJPA-FM: A
- Power: WJPA: 1,000 watts unlimited
- ERP: WJPA-FM: 2,150 watts
- HAAT: WJPA-FM: 119 meters

Links
- Public license information: WJPA: Public file; LMS; WJPA-FM: Public file; LMS
- Webcast: Listen Live
- Website: wjpa.com

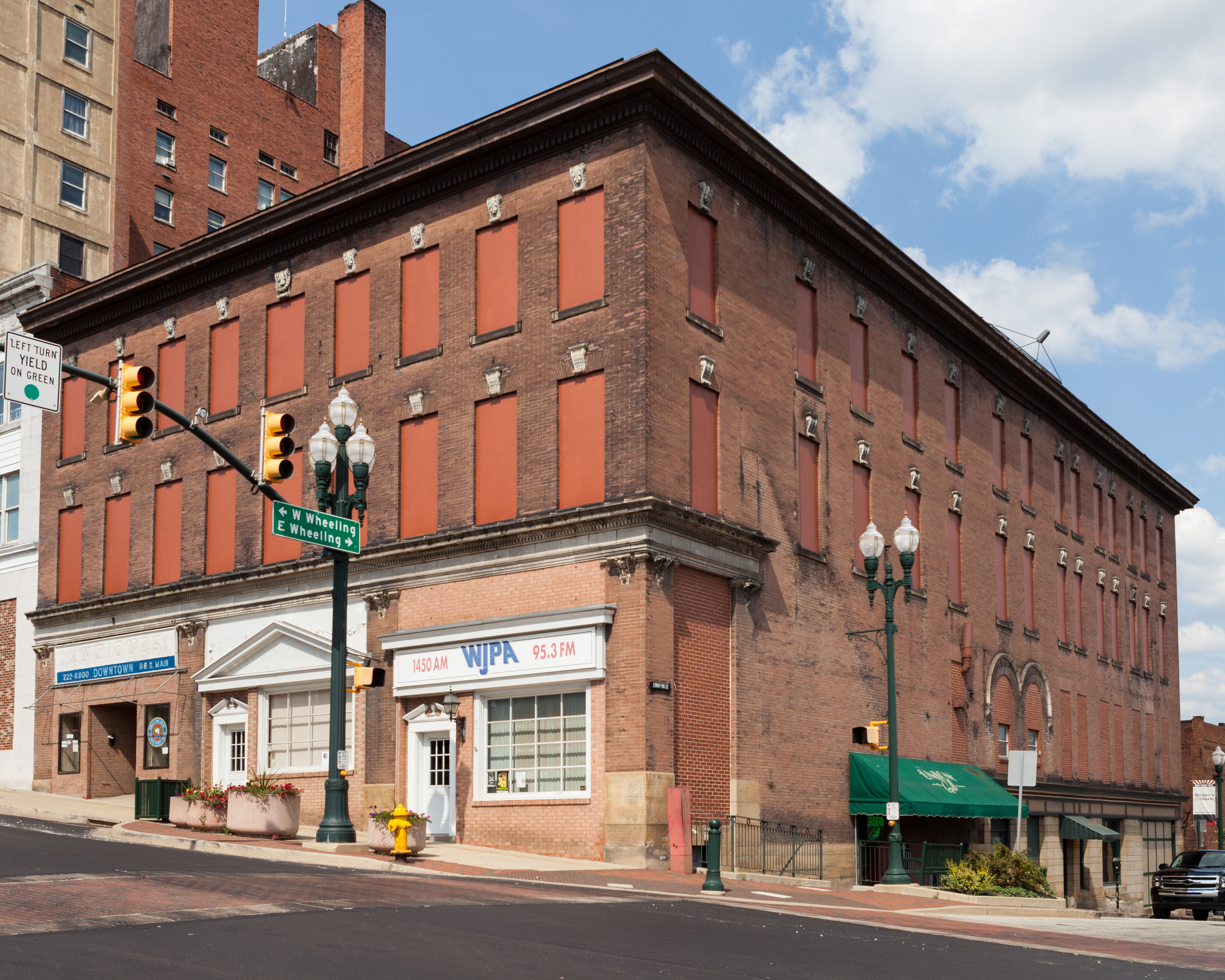
WJPA's storefront on Main St. and East Wheeling St. in Washington, Pennsylvania.

WJPA is a classic hits radio station simulcast on both the AM and FM bands. It serves Washington County, Pennsylvania, and can be heard in parts of Pittsburgh and Allegheny County. The stations, which are owned by Washington Broadcasting Company, operate at 1450 kHz with a transmitter power output of 1 kW-Unlimited on the AM band and at 95.3 MHz with an effective radiated power (ERP) of 2.15 kW on the FM band. Both stations are licensed to Washington, Pennsylvania.

Though, in general, broadcast focuses on classic hits, WJPA is also known for its wide sports coverage. WJPA regularly broadcasts games of the Washington & Jefferson College football team, minor league baseball team, the Washington Wild Things, area high school wrestling matches and area high school basketball.

== History ==
WJPA was started by a consortium of business owners in downtown Washington, several of whom are still part of the ownership group. WJPA made its debut on February 1, 1941. It was one of the last stations the FCC permitted to go on the air prior to the United States' entry into World War II. WJPA-FM also made its debut around this time, but broadcast at a frequency of 104.3 MHz. Because there were few FM receivers and even fewer car radios capable of receiving FM signals, the FM failed to make any kind of financial inroads and its license was returned to the U.S. Federal Communications Commission.

After FM radio started gaining momentum, Washington Broadcasting Company decided to give FM radio another try. The company applied for an FM license, and was granted the application to operate on 95.3 FM. WJPA-FM returned to the air on September 1, 1964. In the summer of 1979, after years of afternoon office-music broadcasts, WJPA-FM switched to a new, album rock format and changed its call letters to WYTK-FM.

In 1983, WYTK moved to a contemporary country format, billing itself as "K-Country". Again an automated station, this format remained until the early 1990s when ownership decided to reclaim the AM's call letters and simulcast the two stations, billing it as "The New Sound of Oldies", referring to the addition of then-new CD technology and a deeper music library than Pittsburgh-based competitor WWSW. This format continues today. WJPA breaks for separate programming occasionally, such as Sunday morning church broadcasts, high school sports, Pittsburgh Steelers football and Pittsburgh Pirates baseball.

== WJPA today ==
The WJPA broadcast facilities are located at the corner of Main St. and East Wheeling St. across from the Observer-Reporter newspaper offices. Both stations transmit from a self-supporting tower at the intersection of Interstates 70 and 79, just north of Washington.

WJPA has a reputation for its tenured on-air staff. Pete "I Got The Beat" Povich (personally nicknamed by The Go-Go's lead singer Belinda Carlisle) is the longest tenured DJ at WJPA, having worked there since 1983. Margie Konstantine, who met Pete while students at California University of Pennsylvania, joined the following year. Sports Director Bob Gregg has been part of the stations for more than three decades. Michael Siegel has served as President and General Manager for the past twenty (20) years.
