= KICU-TV (Visalia, California) =

Television station in Visalia, California (1961–1968)

- Visalia, California; United States
- Channels: Analog: 43 (UHF)

Ownership
- Owner: S. H. Patterson; (Sierra Broadcasting, Inc.)

History
- First air date: December 26, 1961
- Last air date: October 18, 1968

Technical information
- ERP: 2,140 kW
- HAAT: 260 m (850 ft)
- Transmitter coordinates: 36°38′15″N 118°56′35″W

KICU-TV (channel 43) was a television station in Visalia, California, United States, which operated from December 1961 until October 1968. The station's transmitter was located five miles (8 km) east of Badger at Eshom Point.

== History ==
KICU-TV began broadcasting on December 26, 1961. It was owned by Sierra Broadcasting, Inc., of San Francisco, which was headed by Norwood Patterson and co-owned with Fresno's KBIF radio after Patterson acquired it in early 1962. Patterson had previously acquired the Eshom Point transmitter site, which had been used by another failed television station in the area, KVVG-TV (channel 27). The station initially broadcast for 4 1/2 hours a day, with movies as the prime attraction; it would also air programs that Fresno's NBC and CBS affiliates did not clear. Patterson's father owned the KSAN stations in San Francisco, including dormant KSAN-TV channel 32; when S. H. Patterson went to sell channel 32, he was required to activate the facility and did so by simulcasting his son's Visalia channel. KSAN-TV simulcasted KICU-TV for two years until the sale of the San Francisco channel to Metromedia closed in March 1968. The station also aired instructional programming for local schools, as no educational television station existed in the Central Valley at the time.

While the station increased its effective radiated power to 2.13 million watts, claiming to be the most powerful station west of the Mississippi River at the time of the upgrade in 1966, channel 43 was unable to succeed for much longer. KICU-TV closed on October 18, 1968, when Patterson announced that it would go off the air for six to eight months while moving to a site in the Sierra east of Fresno and conducting an upgrade to begin color telecasts. No such move ever materialized; two men attempted to burglarize the Eshom Point transmitter site six months later, and Tulare County also sued Sierra Broadcasting for back taxes after channel 43 stopped telecasting. Further financial troubles were later revealed; for tax withholding violations at his broadcast stations for which he owed the federal government $141,000 in taxes and penalties, owner Patterson was convicted on 16 charges in 1971 and, after two attempted appeals, served a 10-month jail sentence beginning in 1973. The Federal Communications Commission deleted the license in 1975 for failure to respond to commission letters.

With KICU-TV dark, several proposals were made to use channel 43 for an educational television station. The proposals, made by Tulare County, came in the context of efforts to set up a cooperative system on channel 18 in Fresno. In December 1973, Tulare County filed an application for a new channel 43. A later version contemplated the use of facilities offered by Harry Pappas and his KMPH-TV; it was dropped when Fresno County agreed to involve the others more in its channel 18 bid.
