= WLUX =

- Dunbar, West Virginia; United States
- Broadcast area: Charleston–Nitro
- Frequency: 1450 kHz
- Branding: West Virginia Catholic Radio

Programming
- Format: Catholic Religious

Ownership
- Owner: St. Paul Radio Company

History
- First air date: 2011

Technical information
- Licensing authority: FCC
- Facility ID: 160953
- Class: C
- Power: 1,000 watts (unlimited)
- Transmitter coordinates: 38°20′57.0″N 81°44′53.0″W

Links
- Public license information: Public file; LMS

WLUX is a Catholic religious formatted broadcast radio station licensed to Dunbar, West Virginia, serving Charleston and Nitro, West Virginia. WLUX is owned and operated by St. Paul Radio Company.
