= KKXX (AM) =

Radio station in Paradise, California, United States

- Paradise, California; United States
- Broadcast area: Chico, California
- Frequency: 930 kHz
- Branding: Life Radio

Programming
- Format: Christian radio
- Affiliations: Salem Media

Ownership
- Owner: Butte Broadcasting Company, Inc.
- Sister stations: KYIX

History
- First air date: September 1960

Technical information
- Licensing authority: FCC
- Facility ID: 7909
- Class: D
- Power: 1,000 watts (day); 37 watts (night)
- Transmitter coordinates: 39°43′36.6″N 121°40′48.9″W
- Translator: 103.9 K280GL (Chico)
- Repeater: 104.9 KYIX-HD4 (South Oroville)

Links
- Public license information: Public file; LMS
- Webcast: Listen live
- Website: chicochristianradio.com

KKXX (930 AM) is a radio station broadcasting a Christian radio format. Licensed to Paradise, California, United States, the station serves the Chico area. The station is currently owned by Butte Broadcasting Company, Inc. and features programming from Salem Communications.

== History ==
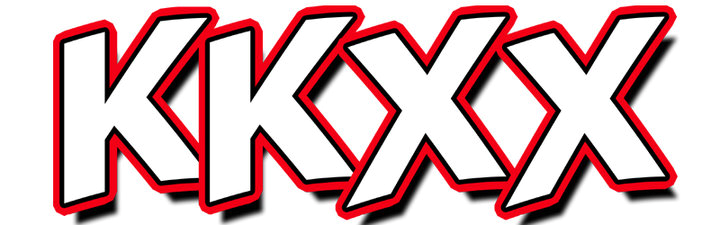
KKXX call letter logo

KKXX first broadcast as KMET in 1960. It was owned by Komet Radio, Inc.

On October 15, 1962, the call letters were changed to KNGL, or "K-Angel". The slogan was "The Voice From Paradise."

On January 6, 1967, the call letters were changed to KEWQ, as "Q-Radio, Family-Oriented Christian Radio", under Butte Broadcasting, Inc., which had acquired the station in December 1966.

In 1988 it began broadcasting under the name KKXX.

Logo when simulcasting on the 104.5 translator

On November 7, 2009, an FM translator K283AR, at 104.5 FM (formerly of KYIX-FM), was acquired as a translator of KKXX, (returning to KYIX-FM on April 1, 2024 as a translator for K-Love on KYIX-HD2 (South Oroville). )

On May 31, 2016, FM translator K280GL, at 103.9 FM (formerly licensed to Lovelock, Nevada), was acquired as a translator for KKXX.

== On-air personalities ==
- Dave Ramsey - The Dave Ramsey Show
- Jerry Olenyn - (formerly of KRCR-TV)
