= KIJN (AM) =

Radio station in Farwell, Texas

- Farwell, Texas; United States
- Broadcast area: Clovis, New Mexico
- Frequency: 1060 kHz
- Branding: Jesus Radio

Programming
- Format: Religious

Ownership
- Owner: Unidos Para Cristo, Inc.

History
- First air date: 1958
- Last air date: 2025
- Former call signs: KZOL (1958–1982)
- Former frequencies: 1570 kHz

Technical information
- Licensing authority: FCC
- Facility ID: 4931
- Class: D
- Power: 10,000 watts day only
- Transmitter coordinates: 34°23′14.3″N 103°01′52.8″W

Links
- Public license information: Public file; LMS

KIJN (1060 AM) was a radio station broadcasting a religious format. It was licensed to Farwell, Texas, United States, and served the Clovis, New Mexico, area. The station was owned by Unidos Para Cristo, Inc.

AM 1060 is a United States and Mexican clear-channel frequency; KYW and XEEP share Class A status. KIJN was required to leave the air between sunset and sunrise in order to protect the nighttime skywave signal of those Class A stations.

The Federal Communications Commission revoked the station’s license on March 28, 2025. It had failed to pay required regulatory fees on time since fiscal year 2012, ending up $27,533.66 in debt to the government at the time of the order.
