= KNHD =

Radio station in Camden, Arkansas

Coordinates: 33.563611°N 92.843611°W

- Camden, Arkansas; United States
- Frequency: 1450 kHz
- Branding: SonLife Radio

Programming
- Format: Christian Radio
- Affiliations: SonLife Broadcasting Network

Ownership
- Owner: Family Worship Center Church, Inc.

History
- First air date: August 8, 1963

Technical information
- Licensing authority: FCC
- Facility ID: 27124
- Class: C
- Power: 1,000 watts

Links
- Public license information: Public file; LMS
- Webcast: Listen Live
- Website: https://sonlifetv.com/

KNHD (1450 kHz) is a Christian radio station licensed to Camden, Arkansas and owned by Family Worship Center Church, Inc. It is also heard at 97.9 FM, through translator K250BQ.

== History ==
The station began broadcasting on August 8, 1963, and held the call sign KJWH. It was originally owned by Ouachita Valley Radio Corporation and aired pop and country music.

In 1986, the station was sold to Gary Coates for $270,000. The station aired an urban contemporary format in the late 1980s. The station was silent in the early 1990s and returned to the air in 1992, with its call sign changed to KOSG and airing a southern gospel format under the new ownership of Hi-Top Broadcasting. In 1994, the station adopted an oldies format, but in 1996 it returned to airing a southern gospel format. In 1997, it was sold to New Horizon Ventures for $30,000, and its call sign was changed to KNHD. In 2002, the station was sold to Family Worship Center Church.

== Translator ==
KNHD is also heard on an FM translator at 97.9 MHz.

Broadcast translator for KNHD
Call sign	Frequency	City of license	FID	ERP (W)	HAAT	Class	FCC info
K250BQ	97.9 FM	Camden, Arkansas	106622	250	46 m (151 ft)	D	LMS
