= KCYL =

Coordinates: 31°02′57″N 98°10′10″W

- Lampasas, Texas; United States
- Broadcast area: Lampasas, Texas
- Frequency: 1450 kHz
- Branding: KCYL 1450 AM

Programming
- Format: News/Talk

Ownership
- Owner: Ronald K. Witcher

Technical information
- Licensing authority: FCC
- Power: 800 Watts

Links
- Public license information: Public file; LMS
- Website: lampasasradio.com

KCYL is a Lampasas, Texas radio station, licensed to Lampasas, Texas, and is under ownership of Ronald K. Witcher. The station airs a News/Talk format. The station also airs local ministers and other local oriented programs on the station.
