= KGWA =

- Enid, Oklahoma; United States
- Broadcast area: Oklahoma City
- Frequency: 960 kHz
- Branding: Talk 100.9 KGWA

Programming
- Format: News/talk
- Affiliations: Fox News Radio; Genesis Communications Network; Premiere Networks; Salem Radio Network; USA Radio Network; Westwood One

Ownership
- Owner: Williams Broadcasting LLC
- Sister stations: KOFM

History
- First air date: 1950

Technical information
- Licensing authority: FCC
- Facility ID: 25899
- Class: B
- Power: 1,000 watts unlimited
- Transmitter coordinates: 36°26′13.1″N 97°55′17.2″W
- Translator: 100.9 K265FL (Enid)
- Repeater: 103.1 KOFM-HD4 (Enid)

Links
- Public license information: Public file; LMS
- Webcast: Listen live
- Website: kgwanews.com

KGWA (960 AM) is a radio station broadcasting a news/talk format. Licensed to Enid, Oklahoma, United States, the station serves the Oklahoma City area. The station is currently owned by Williams Broadcasting LLC and features programming from Fox News Radio, Genesis Communications Network, Premiere Networks, Salem Radio Network, USA Radio Network, and Westwood One.

== Translator ==
Call sign	Frequency	City of license	FID	ERP (W)	HAAT	Class	FCC info
K265FL	(100.9 MHz) FM	Enid, Oklahoma	202813	250	35 m (115 ft)	D	LMS
