= WCOK =

- Sparta, North Carolina; United States
- Broadcast area: Piedmont Triad
- Frequency: 1060 kHz

Programming
- Format: gospel music

Ownership
- Owner: Gospel Broadcasting Inc.

Technical information
- Licensing authority: FCC
- Facility ID: 61680
- Class: D
- Power: 1,100 watts (daytime only)
- Transmitter coordinates: 36°28′55″N 81°05′35″W
- Translators: W297CM (107.3 MHz, Sparta)

Links
- Public license information: Public file; LMS
- Website: http://www.gbiradio.org/wcok.htm

WCOK (1060 AM) is a radio station broadcasting a religious format during daylight hours. Licensed to Sparta, North Carolina, United States, it serves the Piedmont Triad area. The station is owned by Gospel Broadcasting Inc.
