= WHKP =

Coordinates: 35°20′20″N 82°27′20″W

- Hendersonville, North Carolina; United States
- Frequency: 1450 kHz
- Branding: WHKP radio 107.7 fm 1450 am

Programming
- Format: Real Country/Talk

Ownership
- Owner: Radio Hendersonville, Inc.

History
- First air date: 1946
- Call sign meaning: Where the Heavens Kiss the Peaks

Technical information
- Licensing authority: FCC
- Facility ID: 54615
- Class: C
- Power: 970 watts
- Translator: 107.7 W299BZ (Hendersonville)

Links
- Public license information: Public file; LMS
- Webcast: Listen Live
- Website: whkp.com

WHKP is a radio station broadcasting at 1450 on the AM dial in Hendersonville, North Carolina. The call letters stand for Where the Heavens Kiss the Peaks.

The station broadcasts to most of the area in Henderson County and parts of southern Buncombe and parts of northern Polk Counties.

The current format is mostly Real Country and conservative talk and local programming of a conservative nature. Syndicated programming includes Rush Limbaugh and once included Paul Harvey. The station also airs area high school sports.

== History ==
Station owner Kermit Edney hosted one of Western North Carolina's most popular morning shows from 1947 to 1991, when he sold to Radio Henderson Inc. When the station celebrated its 50th anniversary in 1996, Edney was named to the North Carolina Association of Broadcasters Hall of Fame, and a bronze bust of Edney was placed in the FitzSimons Historical Room at the Henderson County Public Library. The Kermit Edney Musical Library was established by WHKP employees.

An Easter Sunrise Service at Chimney Rock Park has aired on WHKP every year since it started in 1956.

Actor and Western Carolina University associate dean Steve Carlisle hosted "It's All about Life," a weekly program.

After 33 years, Al Hope left WHKP's morning show in 2006, replaced by news director and "Open Line Hendersonville" host Larry Freeman, who had worked at the station 40 years. At that time, the station once again began airing adult standards music from the Music of Your Life network at night. Tippy Creswell, who had worked at the station since 1978, would be co-hosting the late morning show with newcomer Abby Ramsey.

After 8 years on WWNC, Matt Mittan began a show on WHKP which aired weekdays from 5 to 6 P.M. starting December 5, 2011.

== Translators ==
Call sign	Frequency	City of license	FID	ERP (W)	Class	FCC info
W299BZ	107.7 FM	Hendersonville, North Carolina	156272	250	D	LMS
