= WLMR =

Religious radio station in Chattanooga, Tennessee

Chattanooga, Tennessee; United States
- Frequency: 1450 kHz

Programming
- Format: Religious

Ownership
- Owner: Wilkins Communications Network, Inc.; (Grace Media, Inc.)

History
- First air date: January 21, 1946
- Former call signs: WAGC (1946–1959); WOGA (1959–1961); WMOC (1961–1983, 1984–1994); WZRA (1983–1984)

Technical information
- Licensing authority: FCC
- Facility ID: 24721
- Class: C
- Power: 1,000 watts unlimited
- Transmitter coordinates: 35°2′54.00″N 85°16′26.00″W
- Translator(s): 103.3 W277DA (Chattanooga)

Links
- Public license information: Public file; LMS
- Webcast: WLMR 1450 Listen Live; WLMR 103.3 Listen Live
- Website: www.wilkinsradio.com/our-stations/wlmr-1450am-103-3fm-chattanooga-tn/

WLMR (1450 AM) is a radio station broadcasting a religious format. Licensed to Chattanooga, Tennessee, United States, the station serves the Chattanooga area. The station is currently owned by Wilkins Communications Network, Inc. In the early 1980s, the station was automated and played country music from studios in a strip mall on Brainerd Rd. It was also Chattanooga's first talk radio station when it held the WZRA call sign. WZRA was the first home of Jeff Styles, and also featured well known personalities such as Kelly McCoy and Robert T. Nash.

== History ==
In 1946, with a 250-watt radio transmitter on Rossville Boulevard, the station signed on at 6:55 a.m. on January 21 as WAGC, said to stand for "Winning a Greater Chattanooga". A network affiliate of the Mutual Broadcasting System, it also carried local programming, including baseball games of the Chattanooga Lookouts. It became WOGA in November 1959, and WMOC in October 1961. After a brief stint as WZRA from September 1983 to August 1984, it became WMOC again until November 1994, when it became WLMR.

Former logo
