= KKVV =

Las Vegas, Nevada; United States
- Frequency: 1060 kHz
- Branding: Best News Radio

Programming
- Format: Christian talk and teaching
- Affiliations: SRN News

Ownership
- Owner: Las Vegas Broadcasters, Inc.

History
- First air date: May 1, 1990; 35 years ago

Technical information
- Licensing authority: FCC
- Facility ID: 36642
- Class: D
- Power: 5,000 watts day 43 watts night
- Transmitter coordinates: 36°9′22″N 115°15′32″W
- Translator: 100.1 K261ES (Las Vegas); 106.1 K291BX (Las Vegas)

Links
- Public license information: Public file; LMS
- Webcast: Listen live
- Website: kkvv.com

KKVV (1060 AM) is a non-commercial, listener-supported radio station in Las Vegas, Nevada, airing a Christian talk and teaching radio format. It is owned by Advance Ministries, Inc., and operates as a non-profit organization. National religious leaders heard on KKVV include Alistair Begg, J. Vernon McGee, Charles Stanley, Greg Laurie and Jim Daly with Focus on the Family. Updates are provided by SRN News. The studios are on Highland Drive.

By day, KKVV is powered at 5,000 watts using a non-directional antenna on Del Ray Avenue at South Buffalo Drive. But 1060 AM is a clear channel frequency reserved for XECPAE Mexico City and KYW Philadelphia. KKVV is also adjacent to 1070 KNX Los Angeles, a Class A station. To avoid interference at night, KKVV reduces power to 43 watts. KKVV programming is also heard on FM translators at 100.1 and 106.1 MHz.

== History ==
The station first signed on the air on May 1, 1990. The call sign, while it was still an unbuilt construction permit, was KREL. The call letters were changed to KKVV on March 1, 1989, a year before the station went on the air.

In 1993, the station was bought by Las Vegas Broadcasters, Inc. The price tag was only $17,000. Management changed the format to Christian talk and teaching, using a brokered programming model, where preachers buys time on the air and use it in part to seek donations to their ministries. By 1994, about six hours of each day's 14 hours of broadcasting were locally produced.

Former logo
