= KRAO-FM =

- Colfax, Washington; United States
- Frequency: 102.5 MHz
- Branding: 102.5 KRPL

Programming
- Format: Classic hits

Ownership
- Owner: Inland Northwest Broadcasting, LLC

History
- First air date: 1989

Technical information
- Licensing authority: FCC
- Facility ID: 15269
- Class: C3
- ERP: 2,200 watts
- HAAT: 329 meters (1,079 ft)
- Transmitter coordinates: 46°51′44.00″N 117°10′20.00″W

Links
- Public license information: Public file; LMS

KRAO-FM (102.5 FM) is a radio station broadcasting a classic hits format in the Palouse region of Northern Idaho and Eastern Washington. Licensed to Colfax, Washington, United States, the station is currently owned by Inland Northwest Broadcasting, LLC.

== History ==
The station went on the air as KRAO-FM on November 29, 1989.

On January 6, 2025, at 7 am, KRAO-FM ended stunting and launched a classic hits format, branded as "102.5 KRPL".

The classic hits format aired on 102.5 KRPL leans rock/alternative, which primary targets persons 25-54+ in the Moscow, ID/Pullman Wa/Colfax, Wa market.

The station currently features Matt Mony in the Morning with 102 Minutes Commercial Free Music at 8:25am, "The 4-Most @4" (the four most talked about songs of the day, weekdays), "The Totally Awesome 80s @8" (weeknights), "10 O'clock Rock" (weeknights), "Retro Pop Reunion" with Joe Cortese (Sundays 2p-6p), as well as a variety of themed weekends - including "Totally Awesome 80s," "House Party," "I Love the 90s," and "Sounds of Summer" weekends.

The station also features market legend Steve Shannon (formerly of sister KZFN-FM) as its big voice.
