= KOFM (FM) =

Radio station in Enid, Oklahoma

Coordinates: 36.4370°N 97.9214°W

- Enid, Oklahoma; United States
- Broadcast area: Enid, Oklahoma
- Frequency: 103.1 MHz (HD Radio)
- Branding: 103.1 KOFM

Programming
- Format: Country
- Subchannels: HD2: Classic hits "The Jet"; HD4: Talk radio (KGWA simulcast)
- Affiliations: Compass Media Networks

Ownership
- Owner: Williams Broadcasting LLC
- Sister stations: KGWA

History
- First air date: 1982
- Former call signs: KUAL (1981–1986)
- Call sign meaning: Oklahoma FM

Technical information
- Licensing authority: FCC
- Facility ID: 25889
- Class: C3
- ERP: 25,000 watts
- HAAT: 91 meters (299 ft)

Links
- Public license information: Public file; LMS
- Webcast: Listen live; HD2: Listen live
- Website: kofm.com; HD2: www.thejet1031.com

KOFM (103.1 MHz) is an FM radio station based in Enid, Oklahoma, United States. The station goes under the moniker "My Country 1031" KOFM. KOFM broadcasts using HD Radio technology and has classic hits under "The Jet" branding on its HD2 subchannel and retransmits sister station KGWA on its HD4 subchannel.

== History ==
The heritage KOFM call letters were on an Oklahoma City Top 40 station on 104.1. KOFM dropped its format in 1986 to become AC "Magic 104" KMGL. The owners of Enid station KUAL (for "Quality Radio") saw a local opportunity for a better call sign, and switched their station from beautiful music to a top 40 format—and applied for the recently abandoned KOFM call letters. KOFM originally launched with the slogan "Maximum Music".

KOFM original on-air talent was JJ Scott in mornings, Frank Baker in Afternoons, also Keith Hillyard and J. Curtis Huckleberry. Beyond those day parts, much of KOFM was automated. Airing a diverse mix of Top 40 music, KOFM became one of the most popular radio stations in NW Oklahoma and its “Maximum Music Machine” remote broadcast vehicle could be found throughout NW Oklahoma.

In 1992, KOFM switched to contemporary country, a format that remains today. It is one of two live and local radio stations along with KGWA 960 AM serving Enid and the surrounding area reaching into 14 counties. It features "My Country Mornings with Clepper and Kaylee". In recent years, KOFM has been recognized as "Station of the Year" by the Oklahoma Association of Broadcasters and a Marconi Award finalist as "Small Market Station of the Year" by the National Association of Broadcasters.
