= WTHU =

Oldies radio station in Thurmont, Maryland

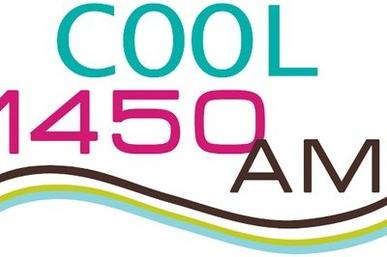
- Thurmont, Maryland; United States
- Broadcast area: Western Maryland; South Central Pennsylvania; Eastern Panhandle of West Virginia
- Frequency: 1450 kHz
- Branding: Cool Oldies 1450 WTHU

Programming
- Language: English
- Format: Oldies
- Affiliations: Fox News Radio; Washington Capitals; Washington Nationals; Washington Wizards

Ownership
- Owner: Christian Radio Coalition, Inc.

History
- First air date: June 12, 1967
- Former call signs: WTHU (1967–1985); WFCO (1985–1986); WTHU (1986–2003); DWTHU (2003)
- Call sign meaning: Thurmont

Technical information
- Licensing authority: FCC
- Facility ID: 10538
- Class: C
- Power: 500 watts (day); 400 watts (night)
- Transmitter coordinates: 39°37′37.0″N 77°24′11.0″W

Links
- Public license information: Public file; LMS
- Webcast: Listen live
- Website: wthuradio.com

WTHU (1450 AM) is an oldies formatted broadcast radio station licensed to Thurmont, Maryland, serving Northern Frederick County, Maryland. WTHU is owned and operated by Christian Radio Coalition, Inc. The station formerly broadcast in C-QUAM AM stereo.
