= WLAF (AM) =

- La Follette, Tennessee; United States
- Broadcast area: Campbell County, Tennessee
- Frequency: 1450 kHz

Programming
- Language: English
- Format: Southern Gospel

Ownership
- Owner: Stair Company, Inc.

History
- First air date: May 17, 1953
- Call sign meaning: LA Follette

Technical information
- Licensing authority: FCC
- Facility ID: 8493
- Class: C
- Power: 1,000 watts (unlimited)
- Transmitter coordinates: 36°22′52″N 84°07′32″W
- Translators: (93.9 MHz) W230DC (La Follette); W265BQ (100.9 MHz, Lake City)

Links
- Public license information: Public file; LMS
- Webcast: Listen Live
- Website: http://www.1450wlaf.com/

WLAF (1450 AM) is a radio station licensed to serve La Follette, Tennessee, United States. The station, which came on the air on May 17, 1953, is currently owned by Stair Company, Inc. It was the first radio station in Campbell County, Tennessee.

WLAF broadcasts a format of Southern Gospel music which includes broadcasts from local churches, daily news and information, and local sports for Campbell County.

== History ==
The station was assigned the WLAF call sign by the Federal Communications Commission.

When WLAF initiated broadcasting in 1953 its studio was located in central La Follette, in the Fleet Building. The present (2016) studio was constructed in 1966.

The station programs strictly to Campbell County, Tennessee; providing local news, sports, weather, school information, community announcements, public meeting coverage, and news from local churches.

With radiothons, WLAF raises thousands of dollars each year for charities, including the Campbell County Cancer Association, Open Arms Ministry, Toys from Heaven, and aid to local families and persons struck by various disasters.

Managers over the years include Hillard Mattie, Elmer Longmire, Bill Waddell, and Harold Branam.

WLAF started the long-running Tennessee Jamboree - a live show, held in downtown LaFollette every Saturday night. The show drew well-known singers and musicians, and was well-attended. The show featured the popular Blue Valley Boys.

WLAF began operating Channel 12 Comcast TV on September 1, 1991. WLAF Cable Channel 12 broadcasts local news, religious programming, local sports, and a yearly Christmas parade. When WLAF's cable channel signed on in September 1991, it was on cable channel 4.
