= KAGY =

- Port Sulphur, Louisiana; United States
- Broadcast area: New Orleans-Gulf Coast
- Frequency: 1510 kHz
- Branding: The Swamp Pop Network

Programming
- Format: Swamp Pop

Ownership
- Owner: Spotlight Broadcasting of New Orleans, LLC
- Sister stations: KMRC

History
- First air date: 1966

Technical information
- Licensing authority: FCC
- Facility ID: 43127
- Class: D
- Power: 1,000 watts (days only)
- Transmitter coordinates: 29°29′03″N 89°42′15″W
- Translator: 99.9 K260DI (Port Sulphur)

Links
- Public license information: Public file; LMS
- Website: kagyradio.com

KAGY (1510 AM, "The Swamp Pop Network") is a radio station broadcasting a Swamp Pop format based in southeast Louisiana. Licensed to Port Sulphur, Louisiana, United States, the station is currently owned by Spotlight Broadcasting of New Orleans, LLC. The station originates in Port Sulphur and covers the New Orleans metro. With the location being on the water, the signal travels across the water and covers the coastal areas of Biloxi, Gulfport and Mobile, Alabama.

This FCC assigned call sign had been previously assigned to the college radio station at South Dakota State University, in Brookings, South Dakota. Originally, it had a standard AM transmitter that covered the local area, but due to some incidents, the station was reduced to operate through common-carrier transmitters in the dormitories, which used the AC power mains in the buildings for distribution. The "AGY" part of the call-sign was due to the school being an agriculturally based, land-grant college, thus, KAGY.

KAGY has been the very popular Swamp Pop format since 2002.

On March 9, 2017, KAGY was granted a Federal Communications Commission construction permit to move to a new transmitter site, increase day power to 3,000 watts and add critical hours operation with 720 watts.
