= KMVL-FM =

Coordinates: 31.1112°N 95.9528°W

- Madisonville, Texas; United States
- Frequency: 100.5 MHz
- Branding: KMVL 100.5 FM

Programming
- Format: Classic country

Ownership
- Owner: Leon Hunt
- Sister stations: KMVL, KIVY, KIVY-FM

History
- Call sign meaning: Madisonville

Technical information
- Licensing authority: FCC
- Facility ID: 77642
- Class: C3
- ERP: 25,000 watts
- HAAT: 137 meters (449 ft)

Links
- Public license information: Public file; LMS
- Website: kmvl.net/kmvlhome.html

KMVL-FM is a radio station airing a classic country format licensed to Madisonville, Texas, broadcasting on 100.5 FM. The station is owned by Leon Hunt. Morning show has been anchored by Paul Wright since 2004.
