= KCLX =

Radio station in Colfax–Pullman, Washington

- Colfax, Washington; United States
- Broadcast area: Pullman-Moscow area
- Frequency: 1450 kHz
- Branding: Palouse Country 1450

Programming
- Format: Classic country

Ownership
- Owner: Inland Northwest Broadcasting, LLC
- Sister stations: KMAX

History
- First air date: 1950

Technical information
- Licensing authority: FCC
- Facility ID: 15270
- Class: C
- Power: 1,000 watts (day); 900 watts (night)
- Transmitter coordinates: 46°54′50″N 117°19′28″W

Links
- Public license information: Public file; LMS
- Website: inlandnwbroadcasting.com/radio-products/kclx

KCLX (1450 AM) is a radio station broadcasting a classic country format. Licensed to Colfax, Washington, United States, the station serves the Pullman-Moscow area. The station is currently owned by Inland Northwest Broadcasting, LLC. The station is the Colfax/Pullman broadcaster for the Mariners Radio Network.
