= South Oroville, California =

South Oroville
- census-designated place
- Location in Butte County and the state of California

- Location in the United States
- Coordinates: 39°29′19″N 121°32′17″W
- Country: United States
- State: California
- County: Butte

Government
  - State Senator: Megan Dahle (R)
  - State Assembly: Vacant
  - U. S. Congress: James Gallagher (R)

Area
  - Total: 2.657 sq mi (6.882 km^{2})
  - Land: 2.657 sq mi (6.882 km^{2})
  - Water: 0 sq mi (0 km^{2}) 0%
- Elevation: 187 ft (57 m)

Population (2020)
  - Total: 3,235
  - Density: 1,217/sq mi (470.1/km^{2})
- Time zone: UTC-8 (PST)
  - Summer (DST): UTC-7 (PDT)
- ZIP code: 95965
- Area code: 530
- FIPS code: 06-73178
- GNIS feature ID: 1659826

South Oroville is a census-designated place (CDP) in Butte County, California, United States. The population was 3,235 at the 2020 census, down from 5,742 at the 2010 census.

For all practical purposes, South Oroville is tied to Oroville proper. South Oroville contains a negligible number of businesses, and all residents are dependent on the commercial centers of Oroville, and sometimes Chico if they choose. In fact, there is no clear divide between South Oroville and the Oroville city limits. This also applies to Thermalito, Oroville East, and Palermo. Las Plumas High School is located in South Oroville, and most high school students go to school there.

== Geography ==
According to the United States Census Bureau, the CDP has a total area of 2.7 square miles (6.9 km^{2}), all land.

== Demographics ==
Historical population
Census	Pop.	Note	%±
1960	3,704		—
1970	4,111		11.0%
1980	7,246		76.3%
1990	7,463		3.0%
2000	7,695		3.1%
2010	5,742		−25.4%
2020	3,235		−43.7%
U.S. Decennial Census; 1860–1870 1880-1890; 1900 1910 1920; 1930 1940 1950; 1960 1970 1980; 1990 2000 2010; 2020

South Oroville first appeared as an unincorporated community in the 1960 U.S. census; and as a census-designated place in the 1980 United States census.

=== Racial and ethnic composition ===
South Oroville CDP, California – Racial and ethnic composition Note: the US Census treats Hispanic/Latino as an ethnic category. This table excludes Latinos from the racial categories and assigns them to a separate category. Hispanics/Latinos may be of any race.
Race / Ethnicity (NH = Non-Hispanic)	Pop 2000	Pop 2010	Pop 2020	% 2000	% 2010	% 2020
White alone (NH)	4,953	3,078	1,774	64.37%	53.61%	54.84%
Black or African American alone (NH)	371	374	62	4.82%	6.51%	1.92%
Native American or Alaska Native alone (NH)	272	214	102	3.53%	3.73%	3.15%
Asian alone (NH)	980	883	387	12.74%	15.38%	11.96%
Native Hawaiian or Pacific Islander alone (NH)	3	7	8	0.04%	0.12%	0.25%
Other race alone (NH)	6	0	9	0.08%	0.00%	0.28%
Mixed race or Multiracial (NH)	341	335	245	4.43%	5.83%	7.57%
Hispanic or Latino (any race)	769	851	648	9.99%	14.82%	20.03%
Total	7,695	5,742	3,235	100.00%	100.00%	100.00%

=== 2020 census ===
As of the 2020 census, South Oroville had a population of 3,235. The population density was 1,217.5 inhabitants per square mile (470.1/km^{2}). The median age was 33.8 years; 27.7% of residents were under the age of 18 and 12.8% were 65 years of age or older. For every 100 females, there were 104.4 males, and for every 100 females age 18 and over, there were 99.4 males age 18 and over.

The census reported that 98.1% of the population lived in households, 1.9% lived in non-institutionalized group quarters, and no one was institutionalized. 94.5% of residents lived in urban areas, while 5.5% lived in rural areas.

There were 1,027 households, out of which 35.7% included children under the age of 18, 40.4% were married-couple households, 11.6% were cohabiting couple households, 28.4% had a female householder with no spouse or partner present, and 19.6% had a male householder with no spouse or partner present. 24.4% of households were one person, and 10.1% were one person aged 65 or older. The average household size was 3.09. There were 694 families (67.6% of all households).

There were 1,085 housing units at an average density of 408.4 units per square mile (157.7 units/km^{2}), of which 1,027 (94.7%) were occupied. Of these, 61.0% were owner-occupied, and 39.0% were occupied by renters. 5.3% of housing units were vacant; the homeowner vacancy rate was 0.5% and the rental vacancy rate was 5.2%.

=== Income and poverty ===
In 2023, the US Census Bureau estimated that the median household income was $64,785, and the per capita income was $24,854. About 15.8% of families and 25.8% of the population were below the poverty line.

=== 2010 census ===
The 2010 United States census reported that South Oroville had a population of 5,742. The population density was 1,937.0 inhabitants per square mile (747.9/km^{2}). The racial makeup of South Oroville was 3,407 (59.3%) White, 406 (7.1%) African American, 245 (4.3%) Native American, 885 (15.4%) Asian, 9 (0.2%) Pacific Islander, 361 (6.3%) from other races, and 429 (7.5%) from two or more races. Hispanic or Latino of any race were 851 persons (14.8%).

The Census reported that 5,624 people (97.9% of the population) lived in households, 118 (2.1%) lived in non-institutionalized group quarters, and 0 (0%) were institutionalized.

There were 1,745 households, out of which 771 (44.2%) had children under the age of 18 living in them, 701 (40.2%) were opposite-sex married couples living together, 390 (22.3%) had a female householder with no husband present, 148 (8.5%) had a male householder with no wife present. There were 172 (9.9%) unmarried opposite-sex partnerships, and 11 (0.6%) same-sex married couples or partnerships. 354 households (20.3%) were made up of individuals, and 101 (5.8%) had someone living alone who was 65 years of age or older. The average household size was 3.22. There were 1,239 families (71.0% of all households); the average family size was 3.72.

The population was spread out, with 1,759 people (30.6%) under the age of 18, 685 people (11.9%) aged 18 to 24, 1,453 people (25.3%) aged 25 to 44, 1,382 people (24.1%) aged 45 to 64, and 463 people (8.1%) who were 65 years of age or older. The median age was 30.0 years. For every 100 females, there were 100.9 males. For every 100 females age 18 and over, there were 96.5 males.

There were 1,933 housing units at an average density of 652.1 per square mile (251.8/km^{2}), of which 1,745 were occupied, of which 861 (49.3%) were owner-occupied, and 884 (50.7%) were occupied by renters. The homeowner vacancy rate was 3.1%; the rental vacancy rate was 8.1%. 2,539 people (44.2% of the population) lived in owner-occupied housing units and 3,085 people (53.7%) lived in rental housing units.

== Education ==
Most of the CDP is served by the Oroville City Elementary School District, while a small piece extends into the Palermo Union Elementary School District. All of it is the Oroville Union High School District.

== Annexation ==
The City of Oroville recently annexed two parts of South Oroville, consisting of Area A and B. Together, they have a combined population of 2,725 people. Area A has a population of 2,392 people and Area B's population is 333 people. Area A is an urbanized area and fairly regular in shape. It is located south of Wyandotte Avenue and is bounded on the west by Lincoln Blvd., Ithaca Street comprises the southern boundary, and Area B comprises the eastern boundary. Area B is more rural in character. It consists of larger undeveloped or under-developed parcels. Area B is bounded by Area A to the west, Lower Wyandotte Road to the North East, the current City limit to the east, and V-7 Road and Oro Garden Ranch Road to the South.
