= KMVL (AM) =

Coordinates: 30°57′56″N 95°53′52″W

- Madisonville, Texas; United States
- Broadcast area: Madisonville, Texas
- Frequency: 1220 kHz

Programming
- Format: Adult standards

Ownership
- Owner: Leon Hunt
- Sister stations: KMVL-FM, KIVY, KIVY-FM

History
- First air date: March 1, 1988
- Call sign meaning: Madisonville

Technical information
- Licensing authority: FCC
- Facility ID: 37063
- Class: D
- Power: 500 watts day 11 watts night
- Translator: See § Translators

Links
- Public license information: Public file; LMS
- Website: KMVL's website

KMVL (1220 AM) is a radio station broadcasting an adult standards format. KMVL is licensed, along with its 2 FM translators, to Madisonville, Texas. KMVL is owned by Leon Hunt and is co-owned with its FM sister station, KMVL-FM, also licensed to Madisonville.

1220 AM is a Mexican clear-channel frequency, on which XEB in Mexico City is the dominant Class A station.

== Translator ==
Broadcast translators for KMVL
Call sign	Frequency	City of license	FID	ERP (W)	HAAT	Class	FCC info	Notes
K255AR	98.9 FM	Madisonville, Texas	150789	250	61 m (200 ft)	D	LMS	First air date: April 12, 2007 (in Trinity as a KUZN repeater)
K274DB	102.7 FM	Madisonville, Texas	201715	250	149 m (489 ft)	D	LMS	First air date: January 28, 2021

== History ==
KMVL commenced broadcasting on March 1, 1988.

KMVL was synchrocast on an experimental license co-channel in Huntsville, Texas, as KM2XVL, which ran 170 watts during the day and 11 watts at night. The Huntsville facility was licensed in 2000, and was located off of Phelps Drive, east of Sam Houston State, and U.S. Highway 190. KM2XVL's license was cancelled by the Federal Communications Commission on August 2, 2021.
