= KMRF =

Radio station in Marshfield, Missouri, US

- Marshfield, Missouri; United States
- Broadcast area: Springfield, Missouri
- Frequency: 1510 kHz

Programming
- Format: Gospel music

Ownership
- Owner: New Life Evangelistic Center

History
- First air date: November 1, 1969
- Former call signs: KEMM (1969–1980); KOSC (1980–1987)

Technical information
- Licensing authority: FCC
- Facility ID: 48536
- Class: D
- Power: 5,000 watts (day); 1,600 watts (critical hours)
- Transmitter coordinates: 37°19′9.2″N 92°57′43.6″W
- Translator: 107.1 K296HN (Marshfield)

Links
- Public license information: Public file; LMS

KMRF (1510 AM) is a radio station broadcasting a gospel music format. Licensed to Marshfield, Missouri, United States, it serves the Springfield area and is owned by New Life Evangelistic Center.

== History ==
The station began broadcasting on November 1, 1969, holding the call sign KEMM, and airing a country music format. It ran 250 watts, during daytime hours only.
