= KGIW =

- Alamosa, Colorado; United States
- Frequency: 1450 kHz
- Branding: AM 1450

Programming
- Format: Classic Hits

Ownership
- Owner: William Spears, Jr.; (Wolf Creek Broadcasting, LLC)

Technical information
- Licensing authority: FCC
- Facility ID: 12814
- Class: C
- Power: 1,000 watts unlimited
- Transmitter coordinates: 37°28′20″N 105°51′13″W
- Translators: K287CA (105.3 MHz, Alamosa)

Links
- Public license information: Public file; LMS
- Webcast: Listen Live
- Website: www.kgiw1450.com

KGIW (1450 AM) is a radio station licensed to Alamosa, Colorado, United States. The station is owned by William Spears, Jr., through licensee Wolf Creek Broadcasting, LLC.
