= KKOV =

- Vancouver, Washington; United States
- Broadcast area: Portland Metropolitan Area
- Frequency: 1550 kHz

Programming
- Format: Silent (was Brokered Foreign language)

Ownership
- Owner: Intelli LLC

History
- First air date: August 10, 1963; 63 years ago (as KGAR)
- Former call signs: KGAR (1963–1981); KVAN (1981–1989); KMJK (1989–1991); KVAN (1991–2003); KKAD (2003–2011)

Technical information
- Licensing authority: FCC
- Facility ID: 69812
- Class: B
- Power: 50,000 watts (day); 12,000 watts (night)
- Transmitter coordinates: 45°38′46.4″N 122°30′55.3″W

Links
- Public license information: Public file; LMS

KKOV (1550 kHz) is a silent AM radio station licensed to Vancouver, Washington, United States, and serving the Portland metropolitan area. The station is owned by Intelli LLC. Studios and offices are on Southeast Lake Road in Portland and the transmitter is in the Parkway East neighborhood of Vancouver, Washington, across the Columbia River from Portland. The station had aired a radio format of brokered ethnic and foreign language programming.

KKOV operates in the daytime with 50,000 watts non-directional, the highest power permitted by the Federal Communications Commission. As 1550 kHz is a Canadian clear channel frequency, at night, the station must reduce power to 12,000 watts and use a directional antenna pattern to protect CBEF Windsor, Ontario, the Class A station on the frequency.

== History ==
The station first signed on the air on August 10, 1963 as KGAR, broadcasting with 10,000 watts but signing off each evening at sunset during the 1960s. Over the years, the station changed ownership and formats several times, and its power was boosted to 50,000 watts by day, 12,000 watts by night. It was assigned the call sign KKOV by the F.C.C. on January 26, 2011.

On April 4, 2011, KKOV changed its format from adult standards to talk, branded as "Talk 1550". On October 29, 2012 KKOV switched back to adult standards, branded as "Sunny 1550". KKOV had carried the music service known as "America's Best Music." The format is syndicated by Westwood One. The music was primarily adult popular hits from 1960 to the present, and artists included The Beatles, Dionne Warwick, Elton John and Frank Sinatra. Some paid brokered programming aired on weekends. National news at the beginning of most hours was supplied by Westwood One News.

On April 2, 2018 KKOV changed its format from adult standards to brokered foreign language programming.
