= KMAX (AM) =

- Colfax, Washington; United States
- Broadcast area: Pullman–Moscow; South Eastern Washington
- Frequency: 840 kHz
- Branding: The Max 840 AM

Programming
- Format: Talk radio
- Affiliations: Compass Media Networks; Premiere Networks; Salem Radio Network; Westwood One

Ownership
- Owner: Inland Northwest Broadcasting, LLC
- Sister stations: KCLX; KRAO-FM

History
- First air date: January 1998
- Former call signs: KRAO (CP, 1995–1996)

Technical information
- Licensing authority: FCC
- Facility ID: 13569
- Class: B
- Power: 10,000 watts (day); 280 watts (night)
- Transmitter coordinates: 46°54′49.6″N 117°19′31.7″W

Links
- Public license information: Public file; LMS

KMAX (840 AM) is a commercial radio station broadcasting a talk format. Licensed to Colfax, Washington, United States, the station serves the Pullman–Moscow and South Eastern Washington region and is owned by Inland Northwest Broadcasting, LLC. KMAX's transmitter is sited off of Hilty Road in Colfax.

KMAX carries a lineup of nationally syndicated conservative talk shows, and is also the Moscow/Pullman affiliate station of Seattle Seahawks football broadcasts.

== History ==
KMAX signed on the air in January 1998; it has broadcast a talk format since its inception. Four years earlier, co-owned KRAO-FM (102.5) came on the air. In June 2005, both stations were acquired by Inland Northwest Broadcasting.
