= KGFF =

Coordinates: 35°21′10.3″N 96°52′40.1″W

- Shawnee, Oklahoma; United States
- Broadcast area: Oklahoma City Metroplex
- Frequency: 1450 kHz
- Branding: KGFF 100.9/1450

Programming
- Format: Classic hits

Ownership
- Owner: Citizen Potawatomi Nation

History
- First air date: 1927

Technical information
- Licensing authority: FCC
- Facility ID: 28152
- Class: C
- Power: 1,000 watts (Daytime); 1,000 watts (Nighttime)
- Translator: 100.9 K265FE (Shawnee)

Links
- Public license information: Public file; LMS
- Webcast: Listen Live
- Website: kgff.com

KGFF (1450 AM) is a radio station licensed to serve Shawnee, Oklahoma, and is owned by the Citizen Potawatomi Nation.

== History ==
The station has operated under varying ownership, but on the same frequency and using the same call letters for the last 75 years.

KGFF was a charter member of the Oklahoma Network when it was formed in 1937.

== Programming ==
1960s, '70s & '80s Pop/Rock are in regular airplay rotation.

== FM Translator ==
KGFF is also broadcast on the following FM translator:

Broadcast translator for KGFF
Call sign	Frequency	City of license	FID	ERP (W)	HAAT	Class	FCC info
K265FE	100.9 FM	Shawnee, Oklahoma	156312	150	113 m (371 ft)	D	LMS

== Office Location ==
KGFF is located at 1570 Gordon Cooper Dr in Shawnee. The air line is 405-273-1450.
