= KLMX =

- Clayton, New Mexico; United States
- Frequency: 1450 kHz
- Branding: Crossroads Christian Radio

Programming
- Format: Christian

Ownership
- Owner: Melba McCollum

Technical information
- Licensing authority: FCC
- Facility ID: 31888
- Class: C
- Power: 1,000 watts unlimited
- Transmitter coordinates: 36°26′39″N 103°11′24″W
- Translator: (104.5 MHz) K283CV (Clayton)

Links
- Public license information: Public file; LMS
- Webcast: Available on website
- Website: www.crossroadschristianradio.com

KLMX (1450 AM) is a radio station broadcasting a Christian format. Licensed to Clayton, New Mexico, United States, the station is currently owned by Melba McCollum.
