= KKAN (AM) =

- Phillipsburg, Kansas; United States
- Frequency: 1490 kHz

Programming
- Format: Variety/Full-service

Ownership
- Owner: Robert D. Yates, Jr.; (Robert D. Yates, Jr. d/b/a RTY Broadcasting)

Technical information
- Licensing authority: FCC
- Facility ID: 70774
- Class: C
- Power: 1,000 watts (unlimited)
- Transmitter coordinates: 39°47′32″N 99°19′55″W

Links
- Public license information: Public file; LMS
- Webcast: Listen Live
- Website: www.kkankqma.com

KKAN (1490 AM) is a radio station licensed to serve the community of Phillipsburg, Kansas. The station is owned by Robert D. Yates, Jr., through licensee RTY Broadcasting, and airs a variety/full-service format.

The station was assigned the KKAN call letters by the Federal Communications Commission on June 23, 1960.
