= KMBL =

- Junction, Texas; United States
- Frequency: 1450 kHz

Programming
- Format: Classic country

Ownership
- Owner: Danny Ray Boyer; (Tenn-Vol Corp.)

Technical information
- Licensing authority: FCC
- Facility ID: 47067
- Class: C
- Power: 1,000 watts
- Transmitter coordinates: 30°29′34″N 99°45′41″W
- Translator: 94.7 K234DE (Junction)

Links
- Public license information: Public file; LMS

KMBL 1450 AM is a radio station licensed to Junction, Texas. The station broadcasts a Classic Country format and is owned by Danny Ray Boyer, through licensee Tenn-Vol Corp.
