= KKZI =

- Barstow, California; United States
- Broadcast area: High Desert/Eastern Sierra
- Frequency: 1310 kHz
- Branding: Ace Radio

Programming
- Format: Travelers information

Ownership
- Owner: Rubin Broadcasting, Inc.

History
- First air date: 1960
- Former call signs: KIOT (1960–1990); KIQQ (1990–2021)

Technical information
- Licensing authority: FCC
- Facility ID: 60423
- Class: D
- Power: 1,000 watts day 80 watts night
- Transmitter coordinates: 34°54′50.9″N 117°01′7.1″W

Links
- Public license information: Public file; LMS

KKZI (1310 AM) is a radio station located in Barstow, California and serving the High Desert/Eastern Sierra area. The station is owned by Rubin Broadcasting, Inc.
