= List of radio stations in New Mexico =

The following is a list of FCC-licensed radio stations in the U.S. state of New Mexico, which can be sorted by their call signs, frequencies, cities of license, licensees, and programming formats.

== List of radio stations ==
Call sign	Frequency	City of License	Licensee	Format
KABG	98.5 FM	Los Alamos	AGM Nevada, LLC	Classic hits
KABQ	1350 AM	Albuquerque	iHM Licenses, LLC	Sports (FSR)
KABQ-FM	95.1 FM	Corrales	iHM Licenses, LLC	Rhythmic oldies
KABR	107.5 FM	Alamo Community	Alamo Navajo School Board, Inc.	Ethnic
KALH-LP	95.1 FM	Alamogordo	Southwestern Trails Cultural Heritage Association	Variety
KALN	102.5 FM	Dexter	Hispanic Target Media, Inc.	Top 40 (CHR)/Adult album alternative
KAMQ	1240 AM	Carlsbad	KAMQ Inc.	Mainstream rock
KANM	90.3 FM	Grants	Board of Education of the City of Albuquerque, NM	New Mexico Music/Public radio
KANR	91.9 FM	Santa Rosa	Board of Education of the City of Albuquerque, NM	New Mexico Music/Public radio
KANW	89.1 FM	Albuquerque	Board of Education of the City of Albuquerque, NM	New Mexico Music/Public radio
KAQF	91.1 FM	Clovis	American Family Association	Inspirational (AFR)
KATK	740 AM	Carlsbad	Carlsbad Radio	Regional Mexican
KATK-FM	92.1 FM	Carlsbad	Carlsbad Radio	Country
KBAC	98.1 FM	Las Vegas	Hutton Broadcasting, LLC	Adult album alternative
KBCQ-FM	97.1 FM	Roswell	Majestic Broadcasting, LLC	Rhythmic contemporary
KBIM	910 AM	Roswell	Noalmark Broadcasting Corporation	Regional Mexican
KBIM-FM	94.9 FM	Roswell	Noalmark Broadcasting Corporation	Country
KBKZ	96.5 FM	Raton	Phillips Broadcasting	Country
KBNM-LP	98.7 FM	Belen	Tixs for Kids	Oldies
KBOM	88.7 FM	Socorro	Regents of the University of New Mexico	Public radio
KBQI	107.9 FM	Albuquerque	iHM Licenses, LLC	Country
KBQL	92.7 FM	Las Vegas	Sangre de Cristo Broadcasting Co., Inc.	Country
KBUY	1360 AM	Ruidoso	Walton Stations, Inc.	Classic hits
KCCC	930 AM	Carlsbad	Chandler Broadcasting Llc.	Classic country
KCDY	104.1 FM	Carlsbad	KAMQ Inc.	Adult contemporary
KCEI	90.1 FM	Red River	Cultural Energy	Variety
KCHS	1400 AM	Truth Or Consequences	GPK Media	Country
KCIE	90.5 FM	Dulce	Jicarilla Apache Tribe	Variety
KCKN	1020 AM	Roswell	Radio Vision Cristiana Subsidiary Corp.	Classic country
KCLV	1240 AM	Clovis	Zia Radio Group LLC	News/Talk
KCLV-FM	99.1 FM	Clovis	Zia Radio Group LLC	Country
KCMG-LP	100.1 FM	Lovington	Lovington Christian Broadcasting Corporation	Christian
KCQL	1340 AM	Aztec	iHM Licenses, LLC	Sports (FSR)
KCZY	107.3 FM	Crownpoint	Navajo Technical University	College
KDAG	96.9 FM	Farmington	iHM Licenses, LLC	Active rock
KDAZ	700 AM	Albuquerque	Pan American Broadcasting	Talk/Christian
KDCE	950 AM	Espanola	Richard L. Garcia Broadcasting, Inc.	Spanish adult contemporary
KDEM	94.3 FM	Deming	Bravo Mic Communications, LLC	Adult contemporary
KDNF	840 AM	Belen	KD Radio Inc.	Classic country
KDNM	90.1 FM	Reserve	KUTE, Inc.	Top 40 (CHR)/Adult album alternative/Variety
KDRF	103.3 FM	Albuquerque	Radio License Holding CBC, LLC	Adult hits
KDSK	1240 AM	Los Ranchos	KD Radio, Inc.	Oldies
KDSK-FM	92.7 FM	Grants	KD Radio	Oldies
KEDP	91.1 FM	Las Vegas	Board of Education of the City of Albuquerque	Classic rock/college
KEDU-LP	102.3 FM	Ruidoso	Christian Business Owners of Lincoln County	Oldies
KEJL	1110 AM	Hobbs	Noalmark Broadcasting Corporation	Classic rock
KELP-FM	89.3 FM	Mesquite	Sky High Broadcasting	Christian
KELU	90.3 FM	Clovis	Educational Media Foundation	Contemporary Christian (K-Love)
KEMR	1090 AM	Moriarty	Isleta Radio Company	Classic hits/Oldies
KEND	106.5 FM	Roswell	Pecos Valley Broadcasting	News/Talk
KENE	88.1 FM	Eagle Tail	Eastern New Mexico University	Public radio
KENG	88.5 FM	Ruidoso	Eastern New Mexico University	Public radio
KENM	89.3 FM	Tucumcari	Eastern New Mexico University	Public radio
KENN	1390 AM	Farmington	Hutton Broadcasting, LLC	News/Talk
KENU	88.5 FM	Des Moines	Eastern New Mexico University	Public radio
KENW-FM	89.5 FM	Portales	Eastern New Mexico University	Public radio
KEZF	88.7 FM	Grants	Cedar Cove Broadcasting, Inc.	Variety
KFDP-LP	93.5 FM	Bloomfield	City of Bloomfield	Variety
KFLQ	91.5 FM	Albuquerque	Family Life Broadcasting System	Religious (Family Life Radio)
KFMM	99.1 FM	Virden, New Mexico	Cochise Broadcasting LLC	Classic rock
KFMQ	106.1 FM	Gallup	iHM Licenses, LLC	Mainstream rock
KFUN	1230 AM	Las Vegas	Baca Broadcasting	Northern New Mexico music
KGAK	1330 AM	Gallup	KRJG Inc.	Ethnic Navajo
KGCN	91.7 FM	Roswell	Educational Media Foundation	Spanish Christian
KGGA	88.1 FM	Gallup	Board of Education of the City of Albuquerque, NM	New Mexico Music/Public radio
KGLP	91.7 FM	Gallup	Gallup Public Radio	Public radio
KGLX	99.1 FM	Gallup	iHM Licenses, LLC	Country
KGMG-LP	93.9 FM	Clovis	Clovis Seventh Day Adventist Church	Christian
KGRT-FM	103.9 FM	Las Cruces	ARG of Las Cruces LLC	Country
KHAC	880 AM	Tse Bonito	Western Indian Ministries	Christian
KHBX-LP	99.3 FM	Hobbs	City of Hobbs, NM	Emergency Info
KHFM	95.5 FM	Santa Fe	The American General Media Foundation	Classical
KHII	88.9 FM	Cloudcroft	Southern New Mexico Radio Foundation	Gospel
KHQT	103.1 FM	Las Cruces	ARG of Las Cruces LLC	Rhythmic contemporary
KIDS	88.1 FM	Grants	Board of Education of the City of Albuquerque, N.M.	New Mexico Music/Public radio
KIDX	101.5 FM	Ruidoso	MTD Inc.	Classic rock
KINN	1270 AM	Alamogordo	Burt Broadcasting	News/Talk
KIOT	102.5 FM	Los Lunas	AGM Nevada, LLC	Classic rock
KIVA	1600 AM	Albuquerque	Rock of Talk LLC	Talk
KIXN	102.9 FM	Hobbs	Noalmark Broadcasting Corporation	Country
KJFA-FM	102.9 FM	Pecos	AGM Nevada, LLC	Hispanic rhythmic
KJLL-LP	107.7 FM	Hobbs	Hobbs Christian Education Radio, Inc.	Christian
KKFG	104.5 FM	Bloomfield	iHM Licenses, LLC	Classic hits
KKIM	1000 AM	Albuquerque	Wild West Radio Corporation	Christian
KKIT	95.9 FM	Taos	L.M.N.O.C. Broadcasting LLC	Top 40 (CHR)
KKNS	1310 AM	Corrales	The Navajo Nation	Simulcast of KTNN
KKOB	770 AM	Albuquerque	Radio License Holding CBC, LLC	News/Talk
KKOB-FM	96.3 FM	Albuquerque	Radio License Holding CBC, LLC	News/Talk
KKRG-FM	105.1 FM	Santa Fe	AGM Nevada, LLC	Hot adult contemporary
KKSC-LP	100.1 FM	Silver City	Calvary Chapel of Silver City	Religious Teaching
KKSS	97.3 FM	Santa Fe	AGM Nevada, LLC	Rhythmic contemporary
KKTC	99.9 FM	Angel Fire	L.M.N.O.C. Broadcasting LLC	Country
KLAG	91.7 FM	Alamogordo	Educational Media Foundation	Contemporary Christian (K-Love)
KLBU	94.7 FM	Santa Fe	Hutton Broadcasting, LLC	Rhythmic contemporary
KLCF	91.1 FM	Truth or Consequence	Educational Media Foundation	Contemporary Christian (K-Love)
KLDK-LP	96.5 FM	Dixon	Embudo Valley Community Library	Variety
KLEA	95.7 FM	Hobbs	Noalmark Broadcasting Corporation	Classic hits
KLHK	88.3 FM	Hobbs	Educational Media Foundation	Contemporary Christian (K-Love)
KLLU	88.9 FM	Gallup	Educational Media Foundation	Contemporary Christian (K-Love)
KLMA	96.5 FM	Hobbs	Ojeda Broadcasting	Regional Mexican and Tejano
KLMX	1450 AM	Clayton	Jimmy and Melba McCollum	Country
KLMX-FM	97.5 FM	Clayton	Jimmy N. McCollum	Mainstream rock
KLNN	103.7 FM	Questa	West Waves	Adult contemporary
KLVF	100.7 FM	Las Vegas	Baca Broadcasting, LLC	Adult contemporary
KLVO	97.7 FM	Belen	AGM Nevada, LLC	Regional Mexican
KLXC	90.3 FM	Carlsbad	Educational Media Foundation	Contemporary Christian (K-Love)
KLXZ	91.3 FM	Ruidoso	Educational Media Foundation	Contemporary Christian (K-Love)
KLYN-LP	95.7 FM	Las Vegas	The Rock Christian Outreach	Christian
KLYT	88.3 FM	Albuquerque	Calvary Chapel of Albuquerque, Inc.	Christian talk
KMBN	89.7 FM	Las Cruces	The Moody Bible Institute of Chicago	Christian
KMDS	107.1 FM	Las Vegas	Sangre de Cristo Broadcasting Co., Inc.	Groovin' oldies
KMDZ	96.7 FM	Las Vegas	Sangre de Cristo Broadcasting	Classic hits
KMGA	99.5 FM	Albuquerque	Radio License Holding CBC, LLC	Adult contemporary
KMGG-LP	99.9 FM	Albuquerque	Future Broadcasters Inc.	Urban adult contemporary
KMIN	980 AM	Grants	KD Radio	Classic country
KMOU	104.7 FM	Roswell	Majestic Broadcasting, LLC	Country
KMRD-LP	96.9 FM	Madrid	KMRD Inc	Variety
KMTH	98.7 FM	Maljamar	Eastern New Mexico University	Public radio
KMVR	104.9 FM	Mesilla Park	Bravo Mic Communications, LLC	Active rock
KMXQ	92.9 FM	Socorro	Cochise Media Licenses LLC	Classic rock
KNCE	93.5 FM	Taos	Taos Adventures, LLC	Freeform Variety
KNDN	960 AM	Farmington	Basin Broadcasting	Ethnic Navajo
KNDN-FM	97.5 FM	Shiprock	KRJG, Inc.	Country
KNFT	950 AM	Bayard	Skywest Licenses New Mexico LLC	Oldies
KNFT-FM	102.9 FM	Bayard	Skywest Licenses New Mexico LLC	Country
KNFZ	104.7 FM	Bosque Farms	Educational Radio Foundation of East Texas, Inc.	Spanish Christian Contemporary
KNIZ	90.1 FM	Gallup	The Ojo Caliente Restoration Society	Freeform
KNKT	90.7 FM	Cannon AFB	Calvary Chapel of Albuquerque, Inc.	Religious
KNMA	88.1 FM	Tularosa	CSN International	Religious (CSN International)
KNMB	96.7 FM	Capitan	MTD Inc.	Hot adult contemporary
KNMI	88.9 FM	Farmington	Educational Media Foundation	Contemporary Christian
KNMJ	100.9 FM	Eunice	New Mexico Junior College	Classic hits
KNML	610 AM	Albuquerque	Radio License Holding CBC, LLC	Sports (ISN/FSR)
KNMM	1150 AM	Albuquerque	Sangre de Cristo Broadcasting Co., Inc.	New Mexico music
KNMX	540 AM	Las Vegas	Sangre de Cristo Broadcasting	Spanish variety
KNMZ	103.7 FM	Alamogordo	Exciter Media LLC	Classic rock
KNUW	95.1 FM	Santa Clara	Duran-Hill	Talk
KOAZ	1510 AM	Isleta	Vanguard Media LLC	Smooth jazz
KOBE	1450 AM	Las Cruces	Bravo Mic Communications, LLC	Spanish CHR
KOBH	91.7 FM	Hobbs	American Family Association	Religious Talk (AFR)
KOBQ	93.3 FM	Albuquerque	Radio License Holding CBC, LLC	Top 40 (CHR)
KOLZ	102.9 FM	Kirtland	iHM Licenses, LLC	Top 40 (CHR)
KOTS	1230 AM	Deming	Bravo Mic Communications, LLC	Country
KPCL	95.7 FM	Farmington	Native American Christian Voice, Inc.	Religious Talk (AFR)
KPCV	91.7 FM	Portales	Top O' Texas Educational Broadcasting Foundation	Christian (KJRT)
KPEK	100.3 FM	Albuquerque	iHM Licenses, LLC	Hot adult contemporary
KPQN	96.1 FM	Roswell	Hispanic Target Media Inc.	Adult contemporary/Adult album alternative
KPRT-FM	107.9 FM	Kirtland	Hutton Broadcasting, LLC	Adult hits
KPSA-FM	98.5 FM	Lordsburg	Cochise Media Licenses LLC	Classic rock
KPZA-FM	103.7 FM	Jal	Noalmark Broadcasting Corporation	Regional Mexican
KPZE-FM	106.1 FM	Carlsbad	Pecos Valley Broadcasting	Regional Mexican
KQAI	89.1 FM	Roswell	Educational Media Foundation	Worship music (Air1)
KQAY-FM	92.7 FM	Tucumcari	Majestic Broadcasting, LLC	Classic hits
KQBA	107.5 FM	Los Alamos	Hutton Broadcasting, LLC	Country
KQEL	107.9 FM	Alamogordo	Burt Broadcasting	Classic hits
KQLV	90.7 FM	Santa Fe	Educational Media Foundation	Contemporary Christian (K-Love)
KQNM	1550 AM	Albuquerque	Relevant Radio, Inc.	Catholic
KQRI	105.5 FM	Bosque Farms	Educational Media Foundation	Worship music (Air1)
KQTM	101.7 FM	Rio Rancho	Team Broadcasting	Sports (ESPN)
KQTO	88.1 FM	Hurley	Radio Bilingue, Inc.	Mexican and Spanish language music and oldies
KQUQ-LP	102.1 FM	Albuquerque	Quote...Unquote, Inc.	Variety
KRAR	91.9 FM	Espanola	Regents of the University of New Mexico	Public radio
KRKE	1100 AM	Peralta	Don Davis	1980s hits
KRLU	90.1 FM	Roswell	Educational Media Foundation	Contemporary Christian (K-Love)
KRMK	93.7 FM	Las Vegas	Cochise Community Radio Corporation	Top 40 (CHR)/Adult album alternative/College
KRMQ-FM	101.5 FM	Clovis	Global One Media, Inc.	Active Rock
KROZ-LP	105.9 FM	Hobbs	First Bi-lingual Christian Ministeral Association	Christian
KRRE	91.9 FM	Las Vegas	Regents of the University of New Mexico	Spanish
KRRT	90.9 FM	Arroyo Seco	Regents of the University of New Mexico	Public radio
KRST	92.3 FM	Albuquerque	Radio License Holding CBC, LLC	Country
KRSY	1230 AM	Alamogordo	Exciter Media LLC	Talk/Sports
KRSY-FM	92.7 FM	La Luz	Exciter Media LLC	Country
KRTC	88.7 FM	Truth or Consequences	The Tropics, Inc.	Adult contemporary/Adult album alternative/Classic rock
KRTN	1490 AM	Raton	Enchanted Air	Adult contemporary
KRTN-FM	93.9 FM	Raton	Enchanted Air	Variety
KRUC	88.9 FM	Las Cruces	World Radio Network	Spanish religious
KRUI	1490 AM	Ruidoso Downs	Village of Ruidoso New Mexico	News/Talk
KRUX	91.5 FM	Las Cruces	Board of Regents, New Mexico State University	College radio
KRWG	90.7 FM	Las Cruces	Regents of New Mexico State University	Public radio
KRWN	92.5 FM	Farmington	Hutton Broadcasting, LLC	Classic rock
KRXG	91.3 FM	Silver City	Regents of New Mexico State University	Public radio
KRZE	1280 AM	Farmington	Basin Broadcasting Company, Inc.	Regional Mexican
KRZY	1450 AM	Albuquerque	Entravision Holdings, LLC	Spanish sports
KRZY-FM	105.9 FM	Santa Fe	Entravision Holdings, LLC	Grupero/Cumbia
KSCQ	92.9 FM	Silver City	Skywest Media	Hot adult contemporary
KSEL	1450 AM	Portales	Global One Media, Inc.	Classic country
KSEL-FM	105.9 FM	Portales	Global One Media, Inc.	Country
KSFE	96.7 FM	Grants	Vanguard Media LLC	Classic hits
KSFR	101.1 FM	White Rock	Santa Fe Community College	Public radio
KSFX	1230 AM	Roswell	Majestic Broadcasting, LLC	Classic rock
KSHF-LP	96.7 FM	Espanola	Holy Cross, A New Mexico Non-Profit Corporation	Catholic
KSHI	90.9 FM	Zuni	Zuni Communications Authority	Variety
KSIL	107.1 FM	Rincon	Rincon Ventures, LLC	Bilingual rhythmic CHR
KSJE	90.9 FM	Farmington	San Juan College	Classical, Jazz
KSMX-FM	107.5 FM	Clovis	Global One Media, Inc.	Top 40 (CHR)
KSNM	98.7 FM	Truth Or Consequences	ARG of Las Cruces LLC	Classic rock
KSSR-FM	95.9 FM	Santa Rosa	Esquibel LLC	Variety
KSVA	920 AM	Albuquerque	Lifetalk Radio, Inc.	Christian
KSVP	990 AM	Artesia	Pecos Valley Broadcasting	News/Talk
KSWV	810 AM	Santa Fe	GCBendito 4 LLC	Classic hits
KTAL-LP	101.5 FM	Las Cruces	Las Cruces Community Radio	Education/News/Social/Music Variety
KTAO	101.9 FM	Taos	Taos Communications Corp.	Adult album alternative
KTBL	1050 AM	Los Ranchos	Radio License Holding CBC, LLC	Active rock
KTDB	89.7 FM	Ramah	Ramah Navajo School Board	Public radio
KTEG	104.1 FM	Santa Fe	iHM Licenses, LLC	Alternative rock
KTGW	91.7 FM	Fruitland	Native American Christian Voice	Christian
KTMN	97.9 FM	Cloudcroft	Cloudcroft Broadcasting Corporation	Classic rock
KTNM	1400 AM	Tucumcari	Majestic Broadcasting, LLC	Country
KTNN-FM	101.5 FM	Tohatchi	The Navajo Nation	Country
KTQM-FM	99.9 FM	Clovis	Zia Radio Group LLC	Adult contemporary
KTRA-FM	102.1 FM	Farmington	iHM Licenses, LLC	Classic country
KTRC	1260 AM	Santa Fe	Hutton Broadcasting, LLC	Talk (Progressive)
KTRO-LP	99.9 FM	Espanola	The Rock Christian Outreach	Christian
KTRZ	105.5 FM	Taos	L.M.N.O.C. Broadcasting LLC	Top 40 (CHR)/Adult album alternative/Adult contemporary
KTUM	107.1 FM	Tatum	MTD Inc.	Top 40 (CHR)
KTZA	92.9 FM	Artesia	Pecos Valley Broadcasting	Country
KUNM	89.9 FM	Albuquerque	Regents of the University of New Mexico	Public radio
KUPR-LP	99.9 FM	Placitas	Las Placitas Association	Variety
KURU	89.1 FM	Silver City	Gila/Membres Community Radio	Variety
KUSW	88.1 FM	Flora Vista	KUTE, Inc.	Public radio
KUUT	89.7 FM	Farmington	KUTE, Inc.	Public radio
KVCN	106.7 FM	Los Alamos	VCY America, Inc.	Conservative religious
KVIW-LP	104.5 FM	Deming	Calvary Chapel of Deming	Religious Teaching
KVLC	101.1 FM	Hatch	Bravo Mic Communications, LLC	Classic hits
KVLK	89.5 FM	Milan	Educational Media Foundation	Contemporary Christian (K-Love)
KVLP	91.7 FM	Tucumcari	Educational Media Foundation	Contemporary Christian (K-Love)
KVMG	88.9 FM	Raton	Radio Bilingue, Inc.	Mexican and Spanish language music and oldies
KVNM-LP	101.1 FM	Veguita	Idea Ministries	Jazz/Urban Gospel
KVOT	1340 AM	Taos	L.M.N.O.C. Broadcasting LLC	Talk (Progressive)
KVSF	1400 AM	Santa Fe	Hutton Broadcasting, LLC	Sports (ESPN)
KVSF-FM	101.5 FM	Pecos	Hutton Broadcasting, LLC	Jazz
KWES	1450 AM	Ruidoso	Walton Stations, Inc.	Country
KWES-FM	93.5 FM	Ruidoso	Walton Stations, Inc.	Classic country
KWFL	99.3 FM	Roswell	Family Life Broadcasting System	Religious (Family Life Radio)
KWKA	680 AM	Clovis	Zia Radio Group LLC	Sports (FSR)
KWML	570 AM	Las Cruces	ARG of Las Cruces LLC	Rhythmic adult contemporary
KWMW	105.1 FM	Maljamar	MTD Inc.	Country
KWYK-FM	94.9 FM	Aztec	Basin Broadcasting	Adult contemporary
KXFR	91.9 FM	Socorro	Family Stations, Inc.	Christian radio (Family Radio)
KXJR	96.1 FM	Chama	Richard Mark Glover	
KXKS	1190 AM	Albuquerque	Wild West Radio	Conservative talk
KXMT	99.1 FM	Taos	L.M.N.O.C. Broadcasting LLC	Regional Mexican
KXNM	88.7 FM	Encino	KXNM Community Foundation	Variety
KXOT	106.3 FM	Los Lunas	Vanguard Media, LLC	Regional Mexican
KXPZ	99.5 FM	Las Cruces	Bravo Mic Communications, LLC	Country
KXTC	99.9 FM	Thoreau	iHM Licenses, LLC	Rhythmic contemporary
KXXF	106.5 FM	Springer	L.M.N.O.C. Broadcasting LLC	Top 40 (CHR)
KXXI	93.7 FM	Gallup	Millennium Media	Classic rock
KXXQ	100.7 FM	Milan	Relevant Radio, Inc.	Catholic
KYAT	94.5 FM	Gallup	Millennium Media	Ethnic Navajo
KYBR	92.9 FM	Espanola	Richard L. Garcia Broadcasting, Inc.	Classic country
KYCM	89.9 FM	Alamogordo	Your Christian Companion Network, Inc.	Religious
KYEE	94.3 FM	Alamogordo	Burt Broadcasting	Top 40 (CHR)
KYFV	107.1 FM	Armijo	Bible Broadcasting Network, Inc.	Christian
KYLZ	101.3 FM	Albuquerque	Vanguard Media LLC	Classic hip hop
KYOL	91.7 FM	Chama	Radio Bilingue, Inc.	Mexican and Spanish language music and oldies
KYRN	102.1 FM	Socorro	Socorro Community Radio, LLC	Country
KYVA	1230 AM	Gallup	Millennium Media	Oldies
KYVA-FM	103.7 FM	Church Rock	Millennium Media	Classic hits
KZDB	100.5 FM	Roswell	Majestic Broadcasting, LLC	Adult contemporary
KZHM	95.9 FM	Alamogordo	Hispanic Target Media, Inc.	
KZOR	94.1 FM	Hobbs	Noalmark Broadcasting Corporation	Hot adult contemporary
KZRR	94.1 FM	Albuquerque	iHM Licenses, LLC	Mainstream rock
KZTU-FM	90.5 FM	Tucumcari	Iglesia Shekira	
KZXQ	104.5 FM	Reserve	Cochise Broadcasting LLC	Silent
KZZX	105.3 FM	Alamogordo	Burt Broadcasting	Country

== Defunct ==
- KARA
- KAVE
- KCRX
- KHIP
- KHOB
- KICA
- KKYC
- KLEA
- KLEA-FM
- KLLT
- KOOT
- KPAD-LP
- KPKJ
- KQGC
- KRDD
- KRIK
- KRSN
- KSRL-LP
- KYGR
- KZPI
- KZRM
