= KLEA =

KLEA may refer to:

- KLEA (FM), a radio station (95.7 FM) licensed to serve Hobbs, New Mexico, United States
- KLEA (AM), a defunct radio station (630 AM) formerly licensed to serve Lovington, New Mexico
- KLEA-FM (101.7 MHz), a defunct radio station (101.7 FM) formerly licensed to serve Lovington, New Mexico
- Klea Pineda (born 1999), Filipina actress and model
- Battle of Abu Klea
