= KBIM =

KBIM may refer to:

- KBIM (AM), a radio station (910 kHz) licensed to Roswell, New Mexico, United States
- KBIM-FM, a radio station (94.9 MHz) licensed to Roswell, New Mexico
- KBIM-TV, a television station (channel 10 digital) licensed to Roswell, New Mexico
