= KNDN =

KNDN may refer to:

- KNDN (AM), a radio station (960 AM) licensed to serve Farmington, New Mexico, United States
- KNDN-FM, a radio station (97.5 FM) licensed to serve Shiprock, New Mexico
