= KSEL =

KSEL may refer to:

- KSEL (AM), a radio station (1450 AM) licensed to Portales, New Mexico, United States
- KSEL-FM, a radio station (105.9 FM) licensed to Portales, New Mexico, United States
