= KCLV =

KCLV may refer to:

- KCLV (AM), a radio station (1240 AM) licensed to Clovis, New Mexico, United States
- KCLV-FM, a radio station (99.1 FM) licensed to Clovis, New Mexico, United States
