= KPER =

KPER may refer to:

- KNMJ, a radio station (100.9 FM) licensed to serve Eunice, New Mexico, United States, which held the call sign KPER from 2014 to 2015
- KLEA (FM), a radio station (95.7 FM) licensed to serve Hobbs, New Mexico, which held the call sign KPER from 1979 to 2014
