= KYKK =

KYKK may refer to:

- KYKK (FM), a radio station (93.5 FM) licensed to serve Junction, Texas, United States
- KLEA (FM), a radio station (95.7 FM) licensed to serve Hobbs, New Mexico, United States, which held the call sign KYKK from 2014 to 2017
- KEJL, a radio station (1110 AM) licensed to serve Humble City, New Mexico, which held the call sign KYKK from 1981 to 2014
