= KYVA =

KYVA or Kyva may refer to:

- KYVA (AM), a radio station (1230 AM) licensed to Gallup, New Mexico, United States
- KYVA-FM, a radio station (103.7 FM) licensed to Grants, New Mexico, United States
- Illia Kyva (1977–2023), Ukrainian politician

== See also ==
- Kiva (disambiguation)
