= KATK =

KATK may refer to:

- KATK (AM), a radio station (740 AM) licensed to Carlsbad, New Mexico, United States
- KATK-FM, a radio station (92.1 FM) licensed to Carlsbad, New Mexico, United States
