= KBCQ =

KBCQ may refer to:

- KBCQ-FM, a radio station (97.1 FM) licensed to serve Roswell, New Mexico, United States
- KSFX (AM), a radio station (1230 AM) licensed to serve Roswell, New Mexico, which held the call sign KBCQ from 2007 to 2017
