= KOCT =

Television station in Carlsbad, New Mexico (1956–2012)

- Carlsbad, New Mexico; United States
- Channels: Digital: 19 (UHF); Virtual: 6

Programming
- Affiliations: CBS (1956–1966); ABC (satellite of KVKM-TV in Monahans, TX, 1966–1969); ABC (satellite of KELP-TV/KVIA-TV in El Paso, TX, 1969–1993); ABC (satellite of KOAT-TV in Albuquerque, 1993–2012)

Ownership
- Owner: Hearst Television; (KOAT Hearst Television Inc.)

History
- First air date: August 24, 1956
- Last air date: July 18, 2012
- Former call signs: KAVE-TV (1956–1987); KVIO-TV (1987–1993)
- Former channel numbers: Analog: 6 (VHF, 1956–2009)

Technical information
- ERP: 15 kW
- HAAT: 378 ft (115 m)
- Transmitter coordinates: 32°47′38.3″N 104°12′30.4″W

KOCT (channel 6) was a television station in Carlsbad, New Mexico, United States, which operated from 1956 to 2012.

Originally established as KAVE-TV, an independent local station for Carlsbad, in 1956, it was the regional affiliate of CBS for the next decade. The construction of the higher-power KBIM-TV at Roswell in 1966 caused KOCT to lose its CBS affiliation; at that time, it was sold and began a 46-year history as a satellite of three ABC affiliates in succession: KVKM-TV in Monahans, Texas; KELP-TV/KVIA-TV in El Paso, Texas; and KOAT-TV in Albuquerque. Only once in that time, from 1982 to 1984, did the station produce significant local programming in Carlsbad. The call sign was changed to KVIO-TV in 1987 and to KOCT in 1993. In 2012, KOAT surrendered the full-power KOCT license and replaced it with a translator license because doing so allowed it to cease maintaining a separate public file in Carlsbad.

== KAVE-TV, Carlsbad's local station ==
On May 16, 1955, the Carlsbad Broadcasting Corporation, owner of Carlsbad radio station KAVE (1240 AM), (Note: This station was deleted in 1974 for failure to file a renewal application. The frequency is now occupied by KAMQ, which began broadcasting on June 25, 1979.) applied to the Federal Communications Commission (FCC) for a construction permit to build a television station on channel 6 in Carlsbad. Carlsbad Broadcasting had been planning for three years to build a TV station and had purchased a site on "C" Mountain in 1950. The FCC granted the permit in June, though before the station was built, negotiations were concluded to sell KAVE radio and the television station permit to Voice of the Caverns, a company of the Battison family consisting of Nancy Hewitt and John Battison, so that Carlsbad Broadcasting Corporation president Val Lawrence could dedicate himself to managing KROD-TV in El Paso. The English-born John Battison, who first visited the U.S. while on leave from Canada as a fighter pilot with the Royal Air Force, had moved permanently to America in 1945 and worked in the television industry and as an author and professor on television topics. He also was a founding manager of CHCT-TV in Calgary.

The Battisons built KAVE-TV and signed it on the air on August 24, 1956, as a CBS affiliate; Battison suffered a light electrical burn while starting the station up for the first time. Less than two years later, they sold KAVE radio and television to Ed Talbott, the chief engineer of KROD radio in El Paso and a minority stockholder in Voice of the Caverns. However, into the 1960s, KAVE remained unconnected to live network programming. When John Deme, a Connecticut radio station owner, purchased the KAVE stations from Talbott's widow in 1963, he promised a push to provide live programming to Carlsbad viewers, which then needed cable service to receive the Albuquerque stations. This materialized in May 1964 with FCC approval to build a microwave relay between Carlsbad and El Paso.

== Walton and Marsh years ==
In 1966, Deme sold KAVE radio and television to separate, but related, owners. The manager of radio station KVKM in Monahans, Texas, Ross Rucker, acquired KAVE radio for $118,000. At the same time, John B. Walton, whose Walton Stations group owned KVKM and its television adjunct KVKM-TV, spent $325,000 to purchase KAVE-TV. By November, local programming had disappeared from KAVE-TV, and the station was rebroadcasting KVKM-TV. This continued until 1969, when Walton sold the Monahans station and switched KAVE-TV's program source to another ABC affiliate he owned, El Paso's KELP-TV.

Walton sold KELP-TV and KAVE-TV to Marsh Media in 1976, and the parent station was renamed KVIA-TV. Marsh invested significantly in the Carlsbad facility by increasing its effective radiated power to 100,000 watts in 1977, an improvement that had first been sought in 1965 but was later cut back.

Under Marsh, KAVE-TV made its most significant attempt at local programming since 1966. In 1982, Marsh invested a reported $1 million to set up a local operation in Carlsbad to originate regional news coverage for southeastern New Mexico. On September 2, KAVE-TV began airing its own evening newscast. However, Marsh admitted that it had overestimated the regional economy when it conducted a round of layoffs at KAVE-TV the next year, reducing its full-time staff from 22 to 16. That year, the station switched from broadcasting on Mountain Time to Central Time, which at the time was used by the other southeastern New Mexico TV stations, KBIM-TV and KSWS-TV. This had the effect of moving the Carlsbad newscasts, known as Newscenter 6, to 5:30 and 9 p.m. However, Marsh folded the local operation in July 1984, with a company spokesman stating that it "did not prove to be economically feasible". In 1987, the station changed its call sign to KVIO-TV.

== As a satellite of KOAT-TV ==
Six years later, Marsh sold it to Pulitzer Broadcasting, then-owner of fellow ABC affiliate KOAT-TV in Albuquerque, which changed its call letters to KOCT and converted it into a satellite of KOAT-TV. Two years prior, KOAT-TV had opened a news bureau in Roswell and began feeding its existing translators and regional cable systems a version of KOAT with local news, weather, and advertising inserts.

The move allowed KOAT-TV to cement itself as the only source of ABC programming in the region. This was important because of a series of developments in the 1980s. In 1985, Roswell's NBC station, KSWS-TV, was acquired by Albuquerque's KOB and became KOBR. New Mexico Broadcasting Company, the parent of Albuquerque CBS affiliate KGGM-TV, purchased KBIM-TV in 1989. That acquisition led to the dissolution of Roswell as a separate television market by both Arbitron and Nielsen.

Eddy County officials filed complaints with the FCC in 2003 after U.S. Cable, the local cable television company, informed the Eddy County Commission that KOAT's equipment was responsible for frequent signal outages from the KOCT transmitter. KOAT's general manager, Mary Lynn Roper, denied that it was responsible for the issue, noting that no complaints were lodged against reception of KASA-TV, whose signal was carried to the area on the same microwave path.

KOCT ended regular programming on its analog signal, over VHF channel 6, on June 12, 2009, the official date on which full-power television stations in the United States transitioned from analog to digital broadcasts under federal mandate. As part of the SAFER Act, KOCT kept its analog signal on the air until July 12 to inform viewers of the digital television transition through a loop of public service announcements from the National Association of Broadcasters.

While maintaining the KOCT transmission facility, Hearst informed the FCC on July 18, 2012, that it would discontinue the operations of KOCT and KOVT in Silver City, converting both to translators. The move was made to eliminate the need to maintain the KOCT and KOVT public files in their respective cities due to FCC regulations which went into effect on that date.

The existing KOAT translator reusing the KOCT facility, K19JZ-D, occupied a channel that remained allocated for a potential full-service TV station at Carlsbad. In 2022, the FCC auctioned dozens of unused television channel allotments, including channel 19 at Carlsbad; TV-49, Inc., a subsidiary of Weigel Broadcasting, won the bidding with a $471,000 offer. In September 2023, K19JZ-D moved to channel 18.
