= KSFX =

KSFX may refer to:

- KSFX (AM), a radio station (1230 AM) licensed to Roswell, New Mexico, United States
- KOZL-TV, a television station (channel 27) licensed to Springfield, Missouri, United States, which held the call sign KSFX-TV from 2005 to 2011
- KZDB, a radio station (100.5 FM) licensed to Roswell, New Mexico, United States, which held the call sign KSFX from 1989 to 2017
- KOSF, a radio station (103.7 FM) licensed to San Francisco, California, United States, which held the call sign KSFX from 1971 to 1982
