= KWES =

KWES may refer to:

- KWES (AM), a radio station (1450 AM) licensed to Ruidoso, New Mexico, United States
- KWES-FM, a radio station (93.5 FM) licensed to Ruidoso, New Mexico, United States
- KWES-TV, a television station (channel 9) licensed to Odessa, Texas, United States
- KFZX, a radio station (102.1 FM) licensed to Gardendale, Texas, United States (formerly known as KWES-FM from 1981 until 1989)
- Kwes (born 1987), music producer, songwriter, and multi-instrumentalist from London, United Kingdom
