= Kyrk =

KYRK may refer to:

- KYRK, licensed to Taft, Texas
- KVDU, in the New Orleans area (formerly KYRK)
- KXPT, in Las Vegas (formerly KYRK)
- KNMJ, serving Eunice, New Mexico (formerly KYRK)
