= KOLZ =

KOLZ may refer to:

- KOLZ (FM), a radio station (102.9 FM) licensed to serve Kirtland, New Mexico, United States
- KABQ-FM, a radio station (95.1 FM) licensed to serve Corrales, New Mexico, which held the call sign KOLZ from 2016 to 2021
- KOLT-FM, a radio station (95.1 FM) licensed to serve Cheyenne, Wyoming, which held the call sign KOLZ from 1996 to 2016
