= 93X =

93X may refer to:

- KRTK (FM), a radio station (93.3 FM) licensed to serve Hermann, Missouri, United States
- KXXI, a radio station (93.7 FM) licensed to serve Gallup, New Mexico, United States
- KXXR, a radio station (93.7 FM) licensed to serve Minneapolis, Minnesota, United States
- WMFS-FM, a radio station (92.9 FM) licensed to serve Bartlett, Tennessee, United States
