= KIXN =

- Hobbs, New Mexico; United States
- Frequency: 102.9 MHz
- Branding: KIX 103

Programming
- Format: Country

Ownership
- Owner: Noalmark Broadcasting Corporation
- Sister stations: KEJL, KLEA, KPZA, KZOR

History
- Call sign meaning: KIX New Mexico

Technical information
- Licensing authority: FCC
- Facility ID: 14024
- Class: C1
- ERP: 100,000 watts
- HAAT: 118 meters (387 ft)
- Transmitter coordinates: 32°47′12″N 103°7′3″W

Links
- Public license information: Public file; LMS
- Website: www.hobbsamerica.com

KIXN (102.9 FM) is a radio station broadcasting a Country music format. Licensed to Hobbs, New Mexico, United States, the station is currently owned by Noalmark Broadcasting Corporation.

== Engineering ==
Chief Engineer is Kenneth S. Fine, CPBE
