= KFXR =

KFXR may refer to:

- KFXR (AM), a radio station (1190 AM) licensed to Dallas, Texas, United States
- KFXR-FM, a radio station (107.3 FM) licensed to Chinle, Arizona, United States
