= KNMM =

Radio station in Albuquerque, New Mexico

Albuquerque, New Mexico; United States
- Broadcast area: Albuquerque area
- Frequency: 1150 kHz
- Branding: Q102

Programming
- Format: Classic hits; New Mexico music (Saturdays)

Ownership
- Owner: Sangre de Cristo Broadcasting Co., Inc.
- Sister stations: KNMX; KBQL; KMDS; KMDZ

History
- First air date: 1953; 73 years ago
- Former call signs: KDEF (1953–1976); KNWZ (1976–1977); KUFF (1977–1981); KDRM (1981); KDQQ (1981–1982); KDEF (1982–2017)
- Call sign meaning: "New Mexico Music"

Technical information
- Licensing authority: FCC
- Facility ID: 227
- Class: B
- Power: 1,500 watts (day); 105 watts (night)
- Transmitter coordinates: 35°07′56″N 106°37′18″W
- Translator: K271CP 102.1 MHz (Albuquerque)

Links
- Public license information: Public file; LMS
- Website: Facebook page

KNMM (1150 AM and 102.1 FM) is a radio station licensed to Sangre de Cristo Broadcasting Co., Inc. in Albuquerque, New Mexico, United States, the station serves the Albuquerque area. The station switched to 60s and 70s classic hits format, but continues to play New Mexico music on Saturdays with some Tejano music as well, and syndicates Fox News Radio and KOAT-TV for some news programming. KNMM has also reached a 3-year agreement to air live coverage of New Mexico State Aggies football and basketball.

In March 2015, the then-KDEF was granted an FCC construction permit to triplex at the KSVA/KRZY transmitter site. The day power will be 1,500 watts and the night power will be 105 watts. On December 1, 2016, the station was licensed to Sangre de Cristo Broadcasting Co., Inc., which owns four stations in the Las Vegas, New Mexico area.

1150 AM is a Regional broadcast frequency in the United States and Canada.

== FM Translator ==
KNMM also airs on FM translator K271CP 102.1 with 99 watts ERP from the same site as the AM station. KNMM began airing on the translator in December 2017 but it has very limited reach as well as signal conflicts with KQUQ-LP broadcasting in the South Valley.

Broadcast translator for KNMM
Call sign	Frequency	City of license	FID	ERP (W)	Class	FCC info
K271CP	102.1 FM	Albuquerque, New Mexico	144688	99	D	LMS

== History ==
In 1976, 1150 beagan an all-news format as KNWZ. It featured both local news as well as news from CBS Radio.

The station became KDRM on February 2, 1981. On March 6, 1981, the station changed its call sign to KDQQ, and on April 1, 1982, to KDEF. The station had aired a big band/nostalgia format throughout the 1980s and early 1990s.

=== Format changes ===
==== 1997–1999 ====
Sports/Talk with live college sports featuring New Mexico State University and local high school games. On air shows featured hosts Henry Tafoya in the morning drive and Dominic Zarella on afternoon drive. Afternoons and live sports was produced and directed by Brian (Douglas) Spieker, who is currently employed by Delicate Thunder Broadcast Audio as a consultant and contracting producer/technical engineer specializing in the News/Talk/Sports and News and Information formats by 5 groups (11 stations) across Minnesota, North Dakota and, Wisconsin.

==== 2000–2003 ====
On July 1, 2000, KDEF began airing the satellite derived Radio Disney format, which was aimed towards kids, tweens, and younger teens aged 6–14. KDEF continued carrying college and high school games in the evening. The format ended in February 2003, when Radio Disney moved its affiliation in the Albuquerque market to O&O station KALY.

==== 2005–2013 ====
KDEF flipped to an oldies format and still carries high school and some NMSU sports. The station had gone through various changes in recent years including a Spanish language music format just before flipping back to the sports talk format in early 2012 which featured programming from Yahoo! Sports Radio.

==== 2017–present ====
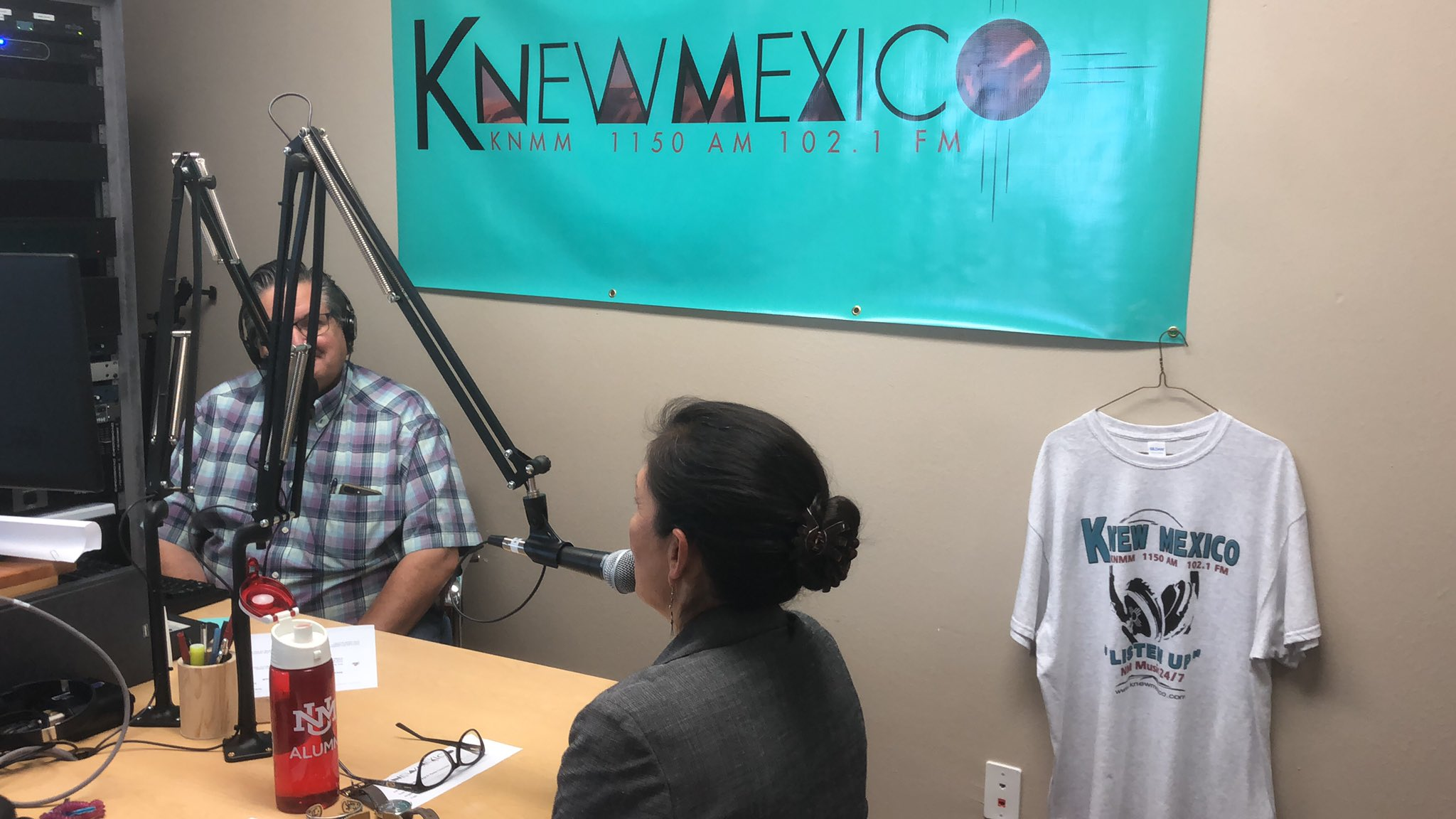
Deb Haaland being interviewed at KNMM in 2019

After the station was acquired by Sangre de Cristo Broadcasting the station became KNMM and began airing a New Mexico music format branded as "K-New Mexico". In early 2021 the station flipped to a 60s and 70s classic hits format branded as "Q102". A weekend countdown of New Mexico music artists continues to air on Saturdays.

== Loss of license ==
On June 27, 2013, the station filed an application for Suspension of Operations/Request for Silent STA with the U.S. Federal Communications Commission (FCC). The reason given was that it had lost the use of its licensed antenna site and that a new site had been found. It was granted on August 23, 2013. KDEF's license expired on October 1, 2013, for failure to file an application for renewal. It was deleted from the FCC database. The FCC wrote the following letter on September 30, 2013:

Dear Counsel:
The license for the above-referenced station will expire on October 1, 2013. An application for renewal of this station's license should have been filed by June 1, 2013, and had not been filed as of the date of this letter. Accordingly, on October 1, 2013, the station's license will expire by its own terms. All authority to operate Station KDEF(AM) will be terminated and the call letters will be deleted from the Commission's database.
Accordingly, all authority to operate station KDEF(AM), Albuquerque, NM, IS TERMINATED and the call letters ARE DELETED as of October 1, 2013. Any operation of this facility after that date is unauthorized.
We note that it is imperative to the safety of air navigation that any prescribed painting and illumination of the station's tower be maintained until the tower is dismantled. Therefore, the owner of the tower where the referenced station's transmitting antenna is located must maintain the tower in the manner prescribed by the Commission's rules and the terms of the expired license.
Sincerely,
[signed]
Peter H. Doyle
Chief, Audio Division
Media Bureau

Starting October 2, 2013, the FCC database stated "Deleted facility record. Deleted facilities cannot be reactivated. Interested parties must file an application for construction permit during the appropriate AM application filing window". However, on October 24, 2013, the FCC accepted for filing a renewal of the KDEF license. The license was reactivated on October 27, 2016 to Sangre de Cristo Broadcasting, however the station remained off the air. The station changed its call sign to KNMM on May 10, 2017.

Throughout the summer the station had been on air playing oldies with no commercials or announcements only mentioning the legal identification. In late August the station changed to a New Mexico music format.

KNMM logo 2017-2021
