= KEND =

- Roswell, New Mexico; United States
- Frequency: 106.5 MHz
- Branding: Roswell's Talk FM

Programming
- Format: News/talk
- Affiliations: Premiere Networks; Westwood One

Ownership
- Owner: Pecos Valley Broadcasting Company
- Sister stations: KPZE, KSVP, KTZA

History
- First air date: 1990

Technical information
- Licensing authority: FCC
- Facility ID: 60059
- Class: C1
- ERP: 65,000 watts
- HAAT: 41 meters (135 ft)
- Transmitter coordinates: 33°23′05″N 104°43′22″W

Links
- Public license information: Public file; LMS
- Webcast: Listen Live
- Website: www.roswelltalkfm.com

KEND (106.5 FM) is a commercial radio station licensed to serve Roswell, New Mexico, United States. The station, which began broadcasting in 1990, is currently owned by the Pecos Valley Broadcasting Company.

KEND broadcasts a news and talk format featuring syndicated personalities Rush Limbaugh, Sean Hannity, Mark Levin, Clyde Lewis, and George Noory.

== History ==
KEND previously had an adult hits music format branded as "Jack FM". The station also aired an active rock format as "The Mix" from 2003 to 2007. In the spring of 2015 KEND switched to a news/talk format, shortly after KBIM AM 910/93.7 had dropped the format for rhythmic CHR in April; most of KBIM's syndicated programming was moved to KEND.

The station was assigned the KEND call sign by the Federal Communications Commission on January 25, 1990.

The call letters KEND previously belonged to 1590 AM in Lubbock, Texas, now KDAV.
