= KTAL =

KTAL may refer to:

- KTAL-FM, a radio station (98.1 FM) licensed to serve Texarkana, Texas, United States
- KTAL-LP, a low-power radio station (101.5 FM) licensed to serve Las Cruces, New Mexico, United States
- KTAL-TV, a television station (channel 26, virtual 6) licensed to serve Texarkana, Texas
