= KDEF =

KDEF may refer to:

- KDEF-LP, a defunct low-power radio station (101.5 FM) formerly licensed to serve Adelanto, California, United States
- KNMM, a radio station (1150 AM) licensed to serve Albuquerque, New Mexico, United States, which held the call sign KDEF from 1982 to 2017
