= KMDZ =

KMDZ may refer to:

- KMDZ (FM), a radio station (96.7 FM) licensed to serve Las Vegas, New Mexico, United States
- Taylor County Airport (Wisconsin) (ICAO code KMDZ)
