= The Nerve =

The Nerve could refer to:

- The Nerve (magazine), a defunct Canadian monthly music magazine
- The Nerve (radio network), an active rock music service from Citadel Media
  - KTUM, "107.1 The Nerve", a radio station licensed to serve Tatum, New Mexico, United States
- "Bearded Billy"/"The Nerve", a 2004 episode of The Grim Adventures of Billy & Mandy
- The Nerves, an American power pop trio based in Los Angeles in the 1970s
- The Nerve, an investigative journalism and news website founded by the South Carolina Policy Council
- The Nerve, an online culture, politics and technology publication founded by Carole Cadwalladr and others
- "The Nerve", a 2025 song by the Happy Fits
