= KSMX =

KSMX may refer to:

- KSMX-FM, a radio station (107.5 FM) licensed to serve Clovis, New Mexico, United States
- KSMA (AM), a radio station (1240 AM) licensed to serve Santa Maria, California, United States, which held the call sign KSMX from 2007 to 2016
- Santa Maria Public Airport in Santa Maria, California, United States
