= KZOR =

- Hobbs, New Mexico; United States
- Frequency: 94.1 MHz
- Branding: Z94

Programming
- Format: Hot adult contemporary

Ownership
- Owner: Noalmark Broadcasting Corporation
- Sister stations: KEJL, KIXN, KLEA, KPZA

Technical information
- Licensing authority: FCC
- Facility ID: 48944
- Class: C1
- ERP: 100,000 watts
- HAAT: 101 meters (331 ft)
- Transmitter coordinates: 32°48′59″N 103°13′56″W

Links
- Public license information: Public file; LMS
- Webcast: Listen live
- Website: hobbsamerica.com

KZOR is a radio station airing a hot adult contemporary format, licensed to Hobbs, New Mexico, broadcasting on 94.1 FM. The station is owned by Noalmark Broadcasting Corporation.

== Engineering ==
Chief Engineer is Kenneth S. Fine, CPBE
