= KAVE (New Mexico) =

- Carlsbad, New Mexico; United States
- Frequencies: 1210 kHz (1937–1941); 1240 kHz (1941–1974)

Ownership
- Owner: Western States Broadcasters Inc.

History
- First air date: September 15, 1937
- Last air date: October 10, 1974
- Former call signs: KLAH (1937–1941)

Technical information
- Power: 1,000 watts daytime; 250 watts nighttime

KAVE (1240 AM) was a radio station located in Carlsbad, New Mexico. The station went on the air in 1937 as KLAH, became KAVE in 1941, and lost its license in 1974.

== History ==
On July 22, 1936, the Federal Communications Commission (FCC) authorized the Carlsbad Broadcasting Company to construct a new station on 1210 kHz in Carlsbad. The company's principals were Barney Hubbs, A. J. Crawford, Jack Hawkins, and Harold Miller; Hawkins and Hubbs also owned the Pecos Enterprise and KIUN in Pecos, Texas. The station, which was assigned the call sign KLAH, went on the air September 15, 1937. In 1941, the station's call sign was changed to KAVE, a nod to the caves at nearby Carlsbad Caverns; it also moved to 1240 kHz under the terms of the North American Regional Broadcasting Agreement.

Carlsbad Broadcasting Company sold KAVE to the unrelated Carlsbad Broadcasting Corporation for $22,000 in 1944, after Hawkins and Hubbs decided to focus on KIUN; most of the new owners' principals—Val Lawrence, Gene Rethmeyer, Norman R. Loose, and Edward Talbott—were associated with KROD in El Paso, Texas. On May 16, 1955, Carlsbad Broadcasting Corporation applied to the FCC for a construction permit to build a television station on channel 6 in Carlsbad. Carlsbad Broadcasting had been planning for three years to build a TV station and had purchased a site on "C" Mountain in 1950. Before construction for the TV station began, negotiations were concluded to sell KAVE radio and the television station permit to Voice of the Caverns, a company of the Battison family consisting of Nancy Hewitt and John Battison, so that Val Lawrence could dedicate himself to managing KROD-TV in El Paso; the Battisons put KAVE-TV on the air August 24, 1956.

In 1958, the KAVE stations were sold to Ed Talbott, the chief engineer of KROD radio and a minority stockholder in Voice of the Caverns. Talbott's death in 1963 was followed by the $250,000 sale of the stations to John Deme, owner of WINF in Manchester, Connecticut. In 1966, Deme sold KAVE radio and television to separate, but related owners. The manager of radio station KVKM in Monahans, Texas, Ross Rucker, acquired KAVE radio for $118,000. At the same time, John B. Walton, whose Walton Stations group owned KVKM and its television adjunct KVKM-TV, spent $325,000 to purchase KAVE-TV.

J. Ross Rucker agreed to sell KAVE to Western States Broadcasters—owned by Frank Cooke, Meyer Rosenberg, Dick A. Blenden, Herman H. Ljnneweh, and Jack Rosenberg—in 1970; the new owners took control on January 14, 1971. Western States programmed a middle of the road (MOR) and rock music format on the station. In 1974, KAVE was fined $5,000 for copyright infringement, as it had played ASCAP-licensed music without paying royalties; the violations had been inherited from the station's previous owner, who had been in a six-year dispute with ASCAP.

On November 7, 1974, the FCC announced that the KAVE license had been deleted for failure to file a renewal application; the renewal had been rejected on October 10 for having been filed late. In February 1975, Western States reapplied for 1240 kHz in Carlsbad, proposing a contemporary rock and MOR station; their application competed against one by James B. Hughes and Gerald M. Hanners for a pop, country and western, and rock station that requested use of the former KAVE facilities. Hughes and Hanners would receive the construction permit in 1978; their new station, subsequently transferred to Hughes alone, went on the air as KAMQ on June 25, 1979.
