= KSVP =

- Artesia, New Mexico; United States
- Frequency: 990 kHz
- Branding: Artesia's Own 990 AM - 93.7 FM

Programming
- Format: News/Talk
- Affiliations: Premiere Networks; Salem Radio Network; Townhall News; Westwood One

Ownership
- Owner: Pecos Valley Broadcasting Company
- Sister stations: KEND, KPZE, KTZA

Technical information
- Licensing authority: FCC
- Facility ID: 52065
- Class: B
- Power: 1,000 watts day 250 watts night
- Transmitter coordinates: 32°49′29″N 104°23′59″W
- Translator: 93.7 K229AS (Artesia)

Links
- Public license information: Public file; LMS
- Webcast: Listen Live
- Website: www.ksvpradio.com

KSVP (990 AM) is a radio station airing a News/Talk format licensed to Artesia, New Mexico. The station is owned by Pecos Valley Broadcasting Company.
