= KTZA =

Radio station in Artesia, New Mexico

- Artesia, New Mexico; United States
- Broadcast area: Carlsbad, New Mexico; Roswell, New Mexico
- Frequency: 92.9 MHz
- Branding: 929 The Brand

Programming
- Format: Country

Ownership
- Owner: Pecos Valley Broadcasting Company
- Sister stations: KEND, KPZE, KSVP

History
- First air date: May 9, 1969
- Former call signs: KSVP-FM (1969–1980)
- Call sign meaning: After the last two syllables of "Artesia"

Technical information
- Licensing authority: FCC
- Facility ID: 52066
- Class: C
- ERP: 100,000 watts
- HAAT: 332 meters (1,089 ft)
- Transmitter coordinates: 32°47′38″N 104°12′29″W

Links
- Public license information: Public file; LMS
- Webcast: Listen live
- Website: http://www.929thebrand.com

KTZA (92.9 FM) is a radio station broadcasting a Country music format. Licensed to Artesia, New Mexico, United States, the station is currently owned by Pecos Valley Broadcasting Company.

Former logo
