= KBUY =

- Ruidoso, New Mexico; United States
- Frequency: 1360 kHz

Programming
- Format: Classic hits
- Affiliations: Fox News Radio

Ownership
- Owner: Will Rooney; (MTD, Inc.)
- Sister stations: KIDX; KNMB; KWES; KWES-FM

History
- First air date: November 1959 (as KRRR)
- Former call signs: KRRR (1959–1983); KREE (1983–1987)

Technical information
- Licensing authority: FCC
- Facility ID: 70826
- Class: D
- Power: 5,000 watts day; 201 watts night
- Transmitter coordinates: 33°19′34.3″N 105°40′15.9″W
- Translator: 105.9 K290AY (Ruidoso)

Links
- Public license information: Public file; LMS
- Website: www.kwes.net/kbuy--105.9-fm.html

KBUY (1360 AM) is a radio station broadcasting a classic hits music format. Licensed to Ruidoso, New Mexico, United States, the station is owned by Will Rooney, through licensee MTD, Inc. and features programming from Fox News Radio.

== History ==
The station changed its call sign from KRRR to KREE on June 27, 1983. On May 1, 1987, the station changed its call sign to the current KBUY.

Former logo

On November 2, 2007, KBUY changed its format from oldies to adult contemporary. On May 26, 2014, it changed its format to classic hits, branded as "K-Buy 105.9".

Walton Stations sold its Rudioso cluster—KBUY, KWES, and KWES-FM—to Will Rooney's MTD Inc., owner of KNMB and KIDX, in 2024 as part of a $170,000 deal.
