= KMVR =

Radio station in Mesilla Park–Las Cruces, New Mexico

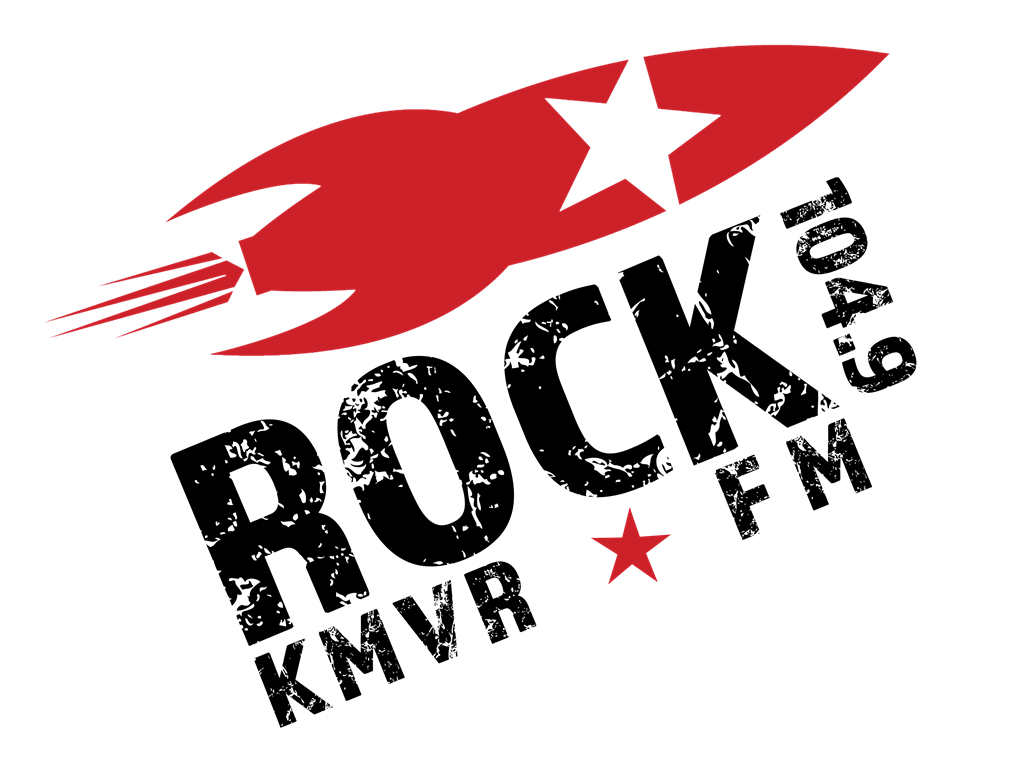
- Mesilla Park, New Mexico; United States
- Broadcast area: Las Cruces, New Mexico
- Frequency: 104.9 MHz (HD Radio)
- Branding: Rock 104.9

Programming
- Format: Active rock
- Subchannels: HD2: Spanish adult contemporary "La Equis 96.7"
- Affiliations: Premiere Networks

Ownership
- Owner: Bravo Mic Communications, LLC
- Sister stations: KOBE, KVLC, KXPZ

History
- First air date: June 1, 1974; 51 years ago (as KOPE)
- Former call signs: KOPE (1974–1987)

Technical information
- Licensing authority: FCC
- Facility ID: 54946
- Class: A
- ERP: 3,000 watts
- HAAT: -10 meters (-32 feet)
- Transmitter coordinates: 32°18′07″N 106°48′08″W
- Translator: HD2: 96.7 K244FF (Las Cruces)

Links
- Public license information: Public file; LMS
- Webcast: Listen Live; Listen Live (HD2)
- Website: rock1049fm.com KMVR-HD2 Online

KMVR (104.9 FM, "Rock 104.9") is a radio station licensed to serve Mesilla Park, New Mexico. The station is owned by Bravo Mic Communications, LLC. It airs an active rock music format featuring artists such as Disturbed, Godsmack, Metallica, Linkin Park, Green Day, and others. Its sister stations are KOBE, KVLC, KXPZ. KMVR-FM broadcasts on 104.9 from Mesilla Park NM.

== Airstaff ==
The current lineup (as of February 2026) is as follows:

- Morning Show (6 a.m. – 10 a.m.): Jack Lutz
- Middays (10 a.m. – 2 p.m.): Ricky T
- Afternoon Drive (2 p.m. – 7 p.m.): Shannon Ellis
- Weekends/Fill-in: Dylan

The station was assigned the KMVR call letters by the Federal Communications Commission on May 18, 1987.

On January 5, 2026, KMVR changed their format from hot adult contemporary to active rock, branded as "Rock 104.9".
