= KBIM-TV =

Television station in Roswell, New Mexico

Satellite of KRQE, Albuquerque–Santa Fe, New Mexico
- Roswell–Carlsbad, New Mexico; United States
- City: Roswell, New Mexico
- Channels: Digital: 10 (VHF); Virtual: 10
- Branding: KBIM News 10

Programming
- Affiliations: 10.1: Fox; 10.2: Independent

Ownership
- Owner: Nexstar Media Group; (Nexstar Media Inc.)
- Sister stations: KRWB-TV

History
- First air date: February 24, 1966
- Former channel numbers: Analog: 10 (VHF, 1966–2009); Digital: 41 (UHF, until 2009)
- Former affiliations: CBS (1966–2026); UPN (secondary, January–October 1995)

Technical information
- Licensing authority: FCC
- Facility ID: 48556
- ERP: 24.32 kW
- HAAT: 610 m (2,001 ft)
- Transmitter coordinates: 33°3′20″N 103°49′14″W
- Translator(s): see § Translators

Links
- Public license information: Public file; LMS
- Website: www.krqe.com

KBIM-TV (channel 10) is a television station in Roswell, New Mexico, United States, affiliated with the Fox network. It is a satellite of Albuquerque-based KRQE (channel 13), which is owned by Nexstar Media Group. KBIM-TV's offices are located on Main Street in Roswell, and its transmitter is located in southeast Chaves County atop the Caprock Escarpment; its parent station maintains studios on Broadcast Plaza in Albuquerque.

KREZ-TV (channel 6) in Durango, Colorado, also serves as a satellite of KRQE. These satellite operations provide additional news bureaus for KRQE and sell advertising time to local sponsors.

== History ==
On June 24, 1963, Taylor Broadcasting Company, owner of KBIM (910 AM), filed an application with the Federal Communications Commission (FCC) for a construction permit to build a new commercial television station on channel 10 in Roswell. Taylor's was the second attempt at building Roswell's channel 10 allocation; the New Mexico Telecasting Company had previously obtained a construction permit for KRNM-TV in 1961. After a hearing, the Taylor permit was granted on November 4, 1964, and construction began the next year at a transmitter site on the Caprock, 29 miles (47 km) east of Hagerman. The 1,839-foot (561 m) tower was the tallest in New Mexico and the world's fourth-tallest at completion.

KBIM-TV began broadcasting as a CBS affiliate on February 24, 1966. However, the station's fortunes took a hard crash little more than a month after signing on. On April 1 at 6:53 a.m., general manager and 50-percent owner W. C. "Bill" Taylor received a call informing him that the station's new tower on the Caprock had collapsed. He believed it to be an April Fool's Day joke; however, it was not. The top 1,350 feet (410 m) of the mast, which housed KBIM-TV and KBIM-FM, fell to the ground. A new tall tower was in service by September. The license was transferred to a related company, Holsum, Incorporated, in 1970.

Tragedy struck the KBIM stations for a second time on the morning of May 31, 1977, when a fire gutted the shared studios on Main Street. The television station was out of service for 10 days. New studios were set up at 214 North Main Street, still used by the television station today. Holsum sold off the radio properties to King Broadcasting in 1981; it then acquired KCBD-TV in Lubbock, Texas, in 1983. KCBD also owned KSWS-TV, Roswell's other commercial station, which was spun off to KOB in Albuquerque; a challenge to the sale held up the acquisition until 1985.

KBIM-TV presented CBS network programs on Central Time, an hour ahead of the local Mountain Time, until 1986; local news was seen at 5 and 9 p.m. local time. This was originally done because its main competitor, KSWS-TV, was tied to KCBD-TV in Lubbock and also aired network programming on Central Time. After KOB acquired KSWS-TV, that station converted to Mountain Time scheduling, and the decision was made to switch at KBIM-TV.

=== Purchase by KGGM-TV ===
In February 1989, the New Mexico Broadcasting Company—owner of KGGM-TV, Albuquerque's CBS affiliate—announced it had reached an agreement to purchase KBIM-TV from Holsum. Holsum had opted to sell instead of carrying out a merger, which was contemplated, because of the depressed regional economy. The Hebenstreit family, majority owners of New Mexico Broadcasting Company, had previously expressed interest in Roswell; their proposal for a new channel 8 TV station was the reason for the delay in KOB purchasing KSWS-TV earlier in the decade.

For KGGM-TV, buying the Roswell station also came with a perk that would benefit every other Albuquerque station. The two television ratings agencies, Arbitron and Nielsen, had reckoned Roswell as a separate media market. Not only would KGGM have access to Roswell's households for the first time, but the Roswell market would be folded into Albuquerque, resulting in the market nearing the national top 50.

That fall, after the $5 million purchase closed, KBIM-TV began airing some of KGGM-TV's newscasts. At 6 and 10 p.m. weeknights, viewers continued to see full newscasts from Roswell; statewide newscasts from Albuquerque were offered at 5 p.m. and on weekends. In 1991, a cost-cutting move saw six people laid off and the 10 p.m. newscasts discontinued, leaving local 5:30 a.m., noon and 6 p.m. newscasts; Within three months, however, and after KOAT-TV began to increase its southeastern New Mexico presence, the station instead decided to sacrifice its noon newscast and air a local 10 p.m. program.

The KBIM-TV acquisition ended up being significant to the Hebenstreits in one other way: it signaled the beginning of the end for one of the nation's last major-market family-owned TV stations. Citing the financial strain of the expansion, in July 1991, the Hebenstreits sold their 58 percent share in New Mexico Broadcasting Company to Lee Enterprises of Davenport, Iowa, which had owned the remainder for five years. KGGM-TV became KRQE the next year.

In 1998, Lee rebranded the combination of KRQE, KBIM-TV, and KREZ-TV in Durango, Colorado (which it had purchased), as "CBS Southwest" and revamped the Roswell and Durango stations' news services to produce inserts into KRQE's early evening newscasts. Two years later, Lee exited broadcasting and sold KRQE, KBIM-TV, and most of its other television properties to Emmis Communications; in 2005, Emmis, in its own exit from television, sold its New Mexico outlets to LIN TV Corporation. Local newscasts from Roswell ended on December 12, 2008, as part of further budget cuts and to reinvest money into technology improvements. KRQE continued to maintain a news presence in Roswell, stationing a reporter there.

KBIM lost its CBS affiliation to KOAT-TV on August 1, 2026, as part of a modified renewal of most other Nexstar affiliations with CBS. Albuquerque was one of four markets where stations owned by Hearst Television assumed the CBS affiliation from Nexstar-owned stations in their markets. KBIM became a primary Fox affiliate with the change.

== Technical information ==
=== Subchannels ===
The station's signal is multiplexed:

Subchannels of KBIM-TV
| Subchannel | Res. | Short name | Programming |
|---|---|---|---|
| 10.1 | 1080i | KBIM | Fox |
| 10.2 | 720p | KBIMXTR | Independent |

=== Analog-to-digital conversion ===
KBIM-TV shut down its analog signal, over VHF channel 10, on June 12, 2009, the official date on which full-power stations in the United States transitioned from analog to digital broadcasts under federal mandate. The station's digital signal relocated from its pre-transition UHF channel 41 to VHF channel 10.

=== Translators ===
- K32OE-D Alamogordo
- K24MW-D Clovis
- K20KT-D Dora
- K16BZ-D Ruidoso
