= KYEE =

- Alamogordo, New Mexico; United States
- Frequency: 94.3 MHz
- Branding: 94 KEY

Programming
- Format: Contemporary Hit Radio

Ownership
- Owner: Burt Broadcasting, Inc.
- Sister stations: KINN, KQEL, KZZX

History
- First air date: 1980
- Former call signs: KKEE, KKBE
- Call sign meaning: "Key"

Technical information
- Licensing authority: FCC
- Facility ID: 7866
- Class: A
- ERP: 3,000 watts
- HAAT: -117 meters (-383 feet)
- Transmitter coordinates: 32°56′42″N 105°56′47″W

Links
- Public license information: Public file; LMS
- Webcast: Listen Live
- Website: Official Website

KYEE (94.3 FM, "94 KEY") is a radio station licensed to serve Alamogordo, New Mexico. The station is owned by Burt Broadcasting, Inc. It airs a Contemporary Hit Radio music format.

The station was assigned the KYEE call letters by the Federal Communications Commission on September 1, 1987. KYEE has a construction permit to increase erp.
