= KDAG =

- Farmington, New Mexico; United States
- Broadcast area: Four Corners area
- Frequency: 96.9 MHz
- Branding: 96.9 The Dog

Programming
- Format: Active rock
- Affiliations: Westwood One

Ownership
- Owner: iHeartMedia, Inc.; (iHM Licenses, LLC)
- Sister stations: KOLZ, KCQL, KKFG, KTRA-FM

History
- First air date: 1975 (as KRAZ)
- Former call signs: KRAZ (1975–1994)
- Call sign meaning: K DAwG ("Dog")

Technical information
- Licensing authority: FCC
- Facility ID: 29519
- Class: C0
- ERP: 100,000 watts
- HAAT: 303 meters (994 ft)
- Transmitter coordinates: 36°48′52″N 107°53′34.2″W
- Translator: 105.7 K289AL (Cortez, Colorado)

Links
- Public license information: Public file; LMS
- Webcast: Listen Live
- Website: 969thedogrocks.iheart.com

KDAG (96.9 FM) is a radio station broadcasting an active rock music format. Licensed to Farmington, New Mexico, United States, the station is owned by iHeartMedia, Inc. and features programming from Westwood One.

== Translators ==
KDAG programming is also carried on a broadcast translator station to extend or improve the coverage area of the station.

Broadcast translator for KDAG
Call sign	Frequency	City of license	FID	ERP (W)	Class	FCC info
K289AL	105.7 FM	Cortez, Colorado	141411	205	D	LMS
