= KBIM (AM) =

- Roswell, New Mexico; United States
- Frequency: 910 kHz
- Branding: Spanish: La Ley, lit. 'The Law' 93.7

Programming
- Format: Regional Mexican

Ownership
- Owner: Noalmark Broadcasting Corporation
- Sister stations: KBIM-FM

History
- First air date: May 27, 1953
- Former call signs: KBIM (1953–2015); KKBE (2015–2021)

Technical information
- Licensing authority: FCC
- Facility ID: 34871
- Class: D
- Power: 5,000 watts (day); 34 watts (night)
- Transmitter coordinates: 33°26′24.3″N 104°31′36.9″W
- Translator: 93.7 K229BV (Roswell)

Links
- Public license information: Public file; LMS

KBIM (910 AM) is a radio station licensed to Roswell, New Mexico, United States. KBIM is owned by Noalmark Broadcasting Corporation and broadcasts a Regional Mexican format as "La Ley 93.7", alluding to the frequency of its FM translator.

== History ==
On October 15, 1952, the Federal Communications Commission (FCC) awarded a construction permit to Theodore Rozzell and William Paul Brown to build a new daytime-only radio station on 910 kHz in Roswell; the station had originally been proposed for location at Clovis. KBIM began broadcasting on May 27, 1953. It had not been on the air six months before its owners sold it to the Taylor Broadcasting Company in November; the new management secured approval to increase power from 1,000 to 5,000 watts the next year. The station, which soon adopted the Todd Storz formula of Top 40, proved to be a ratings and commercial success; using its profits, Taylor was able to start two other stations in the region, in Las Cruces (KGRT) and Colorado Springs (KAFA). Taylor also attempted to purchase Carlsbad's KPBM, but the FCC blocked the deal citing overlap with the signal of his Roswell station. KBIM's facilities were improved in 1965 with the approval of a new transmitter site and directional setup that allowed nighttime broadcasting; despite increased competition, including the launch of the 50,000-watt KSWS (1020 AM), the station remained atop the ratings in Roswell.

In 1966, KBIM expanded to television with the launch of KBIM-TV channel 10, which provided CBS television programming to southeastern New Mexico. Taylor Broadcasting merged into Holsum, Inc., in 1970, in the wake of a merger effectuated after the region entered a regional economic slump caused by the closure of Walker Air Force Base.

Tragedy struck the KBIM stations on the morning of May 31, 1977, when a fire gutted the shared studios on Main Street; the AM radio station was out of service for just one day, as it was able to resume operating by broadcasting directly from the transmitter site. New studios were set up at 214 North Main Street, still used by the television station today. Holsum sold off the radio properties to King Broadcasting in 1981; John King had already been involved with KBIM for 18 years at the time of the transaction, being the husband of Betty King, daughter of W. C. Taylor.

In 1988, the KBIM radio stations moved to new quarters north of downtown, where they continue to operate; at the same time, the AM station switched from contemporary music to the syndicated "Pure Gold" oldies format. The oldies format was dropped for the audio of CNN Headline News in 1994; this evolved into a news/talk format in 1996.

=== Noalmark ownership ===
KBIM was acquired by Noalmark Broadcasting in 2007, marking the retirement of the King family from broadcasting. Noalmark retained the news/talk format on the AM station until 2015, when it changed call letters to KKBE and adopted a contemporary hit radio format as "The Beat". This then was switched in 2018 to "The Light", a contemporary Christian music station, and to an active/alternative rock format known as "The Crash" by 2021.

On November 25, 2021, KKBE dropped its active rock format and began stunting with Christmas music as "Santa 93.7". On December 26, 910 AM emerged from the stunting as Regional Mexican La Ley 93.7, reverting to the historic KBIM call sign; the station features the syndicated El Bueno, La Fea y El Malo morning show and Erazno y la Chokolata in afternoons, a local midday show, and soccer coverage from Fútbol de Primera.

== Translator ==
Broadcast translator for KBIM
Call sign	Frequency	City of license	FID	ERP (W)	Class	FCC info
K229BV	93.7 FM	Roswell, New Mexico	146345	250	D	LMS
