= KOBE (AM) =

Radio station in Las Cruces, New Mexico

- Las Cruces, New Mexico; United States
- Broadcast area: Las Cruces area
- Frequency: 1450 kHz
- Branding: FM News Talk 92.7 and AM 1450 KOBE

Programming
- Format: Conservative talk radio

Ownership
- Owner: Bravo Mic Communications, LLC
- Sister stations: KMVR, KVLC, KXPZ

History
- First air date: April 1947

Technical information
- Licensing authority: FCC
- Facility ID: 54945
- Class: C
- Power: 1,000 watts (unlimited)
- Transmitter coordinates: 32°18′07″N 106°48′08″W
- Translator: 92.7 K224FI (Las Cruces)

Links
- Public license information: Public file; LMS
- Website: lascrucestoday.com/newstalklc

KOBE (1450 AM) is a radio station broadcasting a Conservative News Talk format. Licensed to Las Cruces, New Mexico, United States, the station opened for operation on October 4, 1947, and serves the Las Cruces area. The station is currently owned by Bravo Mic Communications, LLC. Its studios and transmitter are located separately in Las Cruces.

On September 1, 2019 KOBE returned their format to news/talk from Spanish CHR.
