= KRMQ-FM =

- Clovis, New Mexico; United States
- Broadcast area: Clovis area
- Frequency: 101.5 MHz
- Branding: Overdrive 101.5

Programming
- Format: Classic rock
- Affiliations: Westwood One

Ownership
- Owner: Richard Hudson; (Global One Media, Inc.)
- Sister stations: KSEL, KSEL-FM, KSMX-FM

History
- First air date: 2003

Technical information
- Licensing authority: FCC
- Facility ID: 84330
- Class: C1
- ERP: 100,000 watts
- HAAT: 138 meters (453 ft)
- Transmitter coordinates: 34°15′8″N 103°14′21″W

Links
- Public license information: Public file; LMS
- Webcast: Listen live
- Website: overdrive1015.com

KRMQ-FM (101.5 FM, "Overdrive 101.5") is a radio station broadcasting a classic rock format. Licensed to Clovis, New Mexico, United States, the station serves the Clovis area. The station is currently owned by Richard Hudson, through licensee Global One Media, Inc., and features programming from Westwood One.

== History ==
On April 4, 2016, KRMQ changed its format from oldies (branded as "Q101.5") to rock-leaning classic hits, branded as "Big 101.5".
