= KFMQ =

Radio station in Gallup, New Mexico

- Gallup, New Mexico; United States
- Frequency: 106.1 MHz
- Branding: Rock 106.1

Programming
- Format: Active rock
- Affiliations: Premiere Networks

Ownership
- Owner: iHeartMedia, Inc.; (iHM Licenses, LLC)
- Sister stations: KFXR-FM; KGLX; KXTC

History
- First air date: 1994; 32 years ago

Technical information
- Licensing authority: FCC
- Facility ID: 40806
- Class: C1
- ERP: 100,000 watts
- HAAT: 57 meters (187 ft)
- Transmitter coordinates: 35°29′39.1″N 108°44′34.3″W

Links
- Public license information: Public file; LMS
- Webcast: Listen live (via iHeartRadio)
- Website: kfmqrock1061.iheart.com

KFMQ (106.1 FM) is a commercial active rock radio station licensed to Gallup in the U.S. state of New Mexico. The station is owned by iHeartMedia, Inc.
