= KDEM =

- Deming, New Mexico; United States
- Frequency: 94.3 MHz
- Branding: The Mix

Programming
- Format: Adult contemporary
- Affiliations: ABC News Radio

Ownership
- Owner: Bravo Mic Communications, LLC
- Sister stations: KOTS

History
- First air date: July 1983
- Call sign meaning: DEM'ing

Technical information
- Facility ID: 39245
- Class: A
- ERP: 3,000 watts
- HAAT: 59 meters
- Transmitter coordinates: 32°15′5″N 107°45′28″W

Links
- Website: demingradio.com

KDEM (94.3 FM) is a radio station broadcasting an adult contemporary music format. Licensed to Deming, New Mexico, United States. The station is currently owned by Bravo Mic Communications, LLC and includes programming from ABC News Radio.
