= KWMW =

- Maljamar, New Mexico; United States
- Frequency: 105.1 MHz
- Branding: W105

Programming
- Format: Country

Ownership
- Owner: MTD, Inc.
- Sister stations: KTUM

History
- First air date: 1990

Technical information
- Licensing authority: FCC
- Facility ID: 39522
- Class: C1
- ERP: 100,000 watts
- HAAT: 282 meters (925 ft)
- Transmitter coordinates: 32°52′49.2″N 103°41′6.7″W

Links
- Public license information: Public file; LMS
- Webcast: Listen live
- Website: w105radio.com

KWMW (105.1 FM) is a radio station broadcasting a country music format. Licensed to Maljamar, New Mexico, United States, the station is owned by MTD, Inc.
