= KINN =

- Alamogordo, New Mexico; United States
- Frequency: 1270 kHz
- Branding: News Talk KINN 106.3 FM-1270AM

Programming
- Format: News Talk Information
- Affiliations: Fox News Radio; Compass Media Networks; Premiere Networks; Westwood One

Ownership
- Owner: Burt Broadcasting
- Sister stations: KQEL, KYEE, KZZX

History
- First air date: September 1, 1986
- Former call signs: KZZX (1986–1991)

Technical information
- Licensing authority: FCC
- Facility ID: 32997
- Class: D
- Power: 1,000 watts day 80 watts night
- Transmitter coordinates: 32°53′13″N 105°57′4″W
- Translator: 106.3 K292GJ (Alamogordo)

Links
- Public license information: Public file; LMS
- Webcast: Listen Live
- Website: 1270kinn.net

KINN (1270 AM) is a radio station broadcasting a News Talk Information format. Licensed to Alamogordo, New Mexico, United States, the station is currently owned by Burt Broadcasting and features programming from Fox News Radio, Compass Media Networks, Premiere Networks, and Westwood One.

== History ==
The station was assigned the call letters KZZX on 1 September 1986. On 1 September 1991, the station changed its call sign to the current KINN.
