= KFXR-FM =

Simulcasts KGLX Gallup
- Chinle, Arizona; United States
- Broadcast area: Gallup, New Mexico
- Frequency: 107.3 MHz
- Branding: KGLX 99.1 FM & 107.3 FM

Programming
- Format: Country
- Affiliations: Premiere Networks

Ownership
- Owner: iHeartMedia, Inc.; (iHM Licenses, LLC)
- Sister stations: KFMQ; KGLX; KXTC

History
- First air date: November 12, 2001; 24 years ago
- Former call signs: KAKK (1995)

Technical information
- Licensing authority: FCC
- Facility ID: 66816
- Class: C2
- ERP: 3,600 watts
- HAAT: 497 meters (1,631 ft)
- Transmitter coordinates: 36°21′7″N 109°49′56.4″W

Links
- Public license information: Public file; LMS
- Webcast: Listen live (via iHeartRadio)
- Website: 991kglx.iheart.com

KFXR-FM (107.3 MHz) is a radio station licensed to serve Chinle, Arizona. The station is owned by iHeartMedia, Inc. and licensed to iHM Licenses, LLC. It airs a country music format.

The station was assigned the KFXR-FM call letters by the Federal Communications Commission on November 12, 2001.

== Ownership ==
In May 2007, GoodRadio.TV LLC (Dean Goodman, president/CEO) reached an agreement to acquire KFXR-FM from Clear Channel Communications as part of a single massive 175 station deal valued at a reported $452.1 million. The deal fell through when its financing group, American Securities Capital Partners, objected to the deal's cost.
