= KZZX =

- Alamogordo, New Mexico; United States
- Frequency: 105.3 MHz

Programming
- Format: Country

Ownership
- Owner: Burt Broadcasting, Inc.
- Sister stations: KINN, KQEL, KYEE

History
- First air date: July 11, 1995
- Former call signs: KINN-FM

Technical information
- Licensing authority: FCC
- Facility ID: 34923
- Class: A
- ERP: 3,000 watts
- HAAT: -192 meters (630 feet)
- Transmitter coordinates: 32°53′13.3″N 105°57′5.9″W

Links
- Public license information: Public file; LMS
- Webcast: Listen Live
- Website: www.country1053.net

KZZX (105.3 FM) is a radio station licensed to serve Alamogordo, New Mexico. The station is owned by Burt Broadcasting, Inc. It airs a country music format.

The station was assigned the KZZX call letters by the Federal Communications Commission on July 11, 1995.
