= KCDY =

Radio station in Carlsbad, New Mexico

- Carlsbad, New Mexico; United States
- Frequency: 104.1 MHz
- Branding: Mix 104.1 CD104

Programming
- Format: Adult contemporary

Ownership
- Owner: KAMQ, Inc.
- Sister stations: KAMQ, KATK, KATK-FM

History
- First air date: July 3, 1989

Technical information
- Licensing authority: FCC
- Facility ID: 33299
- Class: C1
- ERP: 100,000 watts
- HAAT: 206 meters (676 ft)
- Transmitter coordinates: 32°34′22″N 104°5′32″W

Links
- Public license information: Public file; LMS
- Website: carlsbadradio.com

KCDY (104.1 FM) is a radio station broadcasting an adult contemporary format, licensed to Carlsbad, New Mexico, United States. The station is currently owned by KAMQ, Inc.

On November 19, 2021, a single-engine aircraft crashed into the tower, resulting in the collapse of most of the tower structure; the pilot was killed in the ensuing crash.
