= KXPZ =

Radio station in Las Cruces, New Mexico

Coordinates: 32.693°N 107.069°W

Las Cruces, New Mexico; United States
- Broadcast area: Las Cruces and southern New Mexico
- Frequency: 99.5 MHz
- Branding: Zia Country 99-5

Programming
- Format: Country

Ownership
- Owner: Bravo Mic Communications
- Sister stations: KOBE, KMVR, KVLC

History
- First air date: 1989 (as KVLC)
- Former call signs: KVLC (1989–1993); KROL (1993–2006)

Technical information
- Licensing authority: FCC
- Facility ID: 63453
- Class: C
- ERP: 100,000 watts
- HAAT: 312 meters (1,024 ft)

Links
- Public license information: Public file; LMS
- Webcast: Listen Live
- Website: ziacountry.com

KXPZ (99.5 FM, "Zia Country 99-5") is a commercial radio station licensed to Las Cruces, New Mexico owned and operated by Bravo Mic Communications. It also covers surrounding areas such as Truth or Consequences, Deming, Hatch and West Texas. Its studios are located in Las Cruces and its transmitter is located near Rincon.

== History ==
=== KVLC/KROL "The Rock Of Love" ===
The station launched in 1989 under the KVLC-FM call letter. In mid 1993, the station changed formats to Christian Contemporary as KROL "The Rock Of Love", with most of its programming coming from the Salem Music Networks.

=== The Rocket 99.5 ===
In February 2006, it was announced that Bravo Mic Communications was purchasing the station with the sale becoming final in May of that year. On May 15, 2006, the station dropped the Christian format and began stunting with an all-Barry Manilow format as "Barry 99". Then on June 15 the station launched its active rock format as "The Rocket 99.5" with the call letters KXPZ. For the first three years, the station was jockless until Lyndsey Green joined for afternoons. Later in the year, Jack Lutz, Shannon Ellis and Ricky T. joined the station as well.

=== Zia Country 99-5 ===
On August 31, 2014, it was announced that KXPZ will drop its active rock format and move to online only at TheRocketOnline.com; at which time 99.5 would flip to country as "Zia Country 99-5". The name "Zia Country" is taken from the Native American tribe whose sun symbol is on the New Mexico state flag.

The station made the change on September 2, 2014 at midnight.

Current Nielsen radio ratings for the Las Cruces market: 4.4

(#6).

== Airstaff ==
The current lineup (as of October 2023) is as follows

- Morning Show (6 a.m. – 10 a.m.): Big D and Bubba
- Mid-Days (10 a.m. – 2 p.m.): Leslie T. Travis
- Afternoon Drive (2 p.m. – 7 p.m.): Ricky T
- Weekends: Shannon Ellis
- Weekends: Huston
