= KOTS =

Classic Country Radio Station in Deming, New Mexico

- Deming, New Mexico; United States
- Frequency: 1230 kHz
- Branding: Deming Country

Programming
- Format: Classic country
- Affiliations: AP Radio

Ownership
- Owner: Bravo Mic Communications, LLC
- Sister stations: KDEM

History
- First air date: March 10, 1954

Technical information
- Licensing authority: FCC
- Facility ID: 39244
- Class: C
- Power: 1,000 watts (unlimited)
- Transmitter coordinates: 32°15′5″N 107°45′28″W

Links
- Public license information: Public file; LMS
- Webcast: Listen live
- Website: kotsam.com

KOTS (1230 AM) is a radio station licensed to serve Deming, New Mexico, United States. The station is owned by Bravo Mic Communications, LLC, and broadcasts a classic country format, including news programming from AP Radio.

KOTS broadcasts with an Effective radiated power (ERP) of 1,000 watts, making it a Class C station. The transmitter is off Columbus Road in Deming, New Mexico.

== History ==
KOTS previously broadcast with a Spanish Hits format, before flipping to classic country on July 7, 2025.
