= KNMB =

- Capitan, New Mexico; United States
- Frequency: 96.7 MHz
- Branding: Mix 96.7

Programming
- Format: Adult contemporary

Ownership
- Owner: MTD, Inc.
- Sister stations: KBUY; KIDX; KWES; KWES-FM

History
- First air date: 2002

Technical information
- Licensing authority: FCC
- Facility ID: 87766
- Class: C
- ERP: 25,000 watts
- HAAT: 878 meters (2,881 ft)
- Transmitter coordinates: 33°24′16″N 105°46′54.3″W

Links
- Public license information: Public file; LMS
- Webcast: Listen live
- Website: www.mymix967.com

KNMB (96.7 FM, "Mix 96.7") is a radio station broadcasting an adult contemporary music format. Licensed to Capitan, New Mexico, United States, the station is owned by MTD, Inc.
