= KKFG =

- Bloomfield, New Mexico; United States
- Broadcast area: Four Corners
- Frequency: 104.5 MHz
- Branding: Kool 104.5

Programming
- Format: Classic hits
- Affiliations: AP Radio, Fox News Radio, Premiere Networks

Ownership
- Owner: iHeartMedia; (iHM Licenses, LLC)
- Sister stations: KOLZ, KCQL, KDAG, KTRA-FM

History
- First air date: May 6, 1988 (as KMYO)
- Former call signs: KMYO (1988–1989); KCEM-FM (1989–1992)

Technical information
- Licensing authority: FCC
- Facility ID: 29521
- Class: C
- ERP: 100,000 watts
- HAAT: 331 meters (1,086 ft)
- Transmitter coordinates: 36°38′33″N 107°46′56.2″W

Links
- Public license information: Public file; LMS
- Webcast: Listen Live
- Website: kool1045.iheart.com/

KKFG (104.5 FM) is a radio station broadcasting a classic hits format. Licensed to Bloomfield, New Mexico, United States, the station serves the Four Corners area. The station is currently owned by iHeartMedia and features programming from AP Radio, Fox News Radio and Premiere Networks.

== History ==
The station was assigned the call letters KMYO on May 6, 1988. On September 18, 1989, the station changed its call sign to KCEM-FM. On March 15, 1992, the current KKFG call sign was assigned by the FCC.
