= KVLC =

Radio station in Hatch, New Mexico

- Hatch, New Mexico; United States
- Broadcast area: Las Cruces, New Mexico
- Frequency: 101.1 MHz
- Branding: 101 Gold

Programming
- Format: Classic hits

Ownership
- Owner: Bravo Mic Communications, LLC
- Sister stations: KOBE, KMVR, KXPZ

History
- First air date: 1994
- Former call signs: KWQQ (1988–1992, 1993-1994, CP)

Technical information
- Licensing authority: FCC
- Facility ID: 31530
- Class: C
- ERP: 100,000 watts
- HAAT: 315 meters (1034 feet)
- Transmitter coordinates: 32°41′35″N 107°04′06″W

Links
- Public license information: Public file; LMS
- Webcast: Listen live
- Website: 101gold.com

KVLC (101.1 FM, "101 Gold") is a radio station licensed to serve Hatch, New Mexico. The station is owned by Bravo Mic Communications, LLC. It airs a classic hits music format and its sister stations are KOBE, KMVR, KXPZ. Its studios are located in Las Cruces, and its transmitter is in Rincon, New Mexico.

The station was assigned the KVLC call letters by the Federal Communications Commission on March 25, 1994.
