= KXTC =

- Thoreau, New Mexico; United States
- Broadcast area: McKinley County, New Mexico
- Frequency: 99.9 MHz
- Branding: 99-9 XTC

Programming
- Language: English
- Format: Rhythmic contemporary
- Affiliations: Premiere Networks

Ownership
- Owner: iHeartMedia, Inc.; (iHM Licenses, LLC)
- Sister stations: KFMQ, KFXR-FM, KGLX

History
- First air date: 1991; 35 years ago
- Former call signs: KMCC (1987–1990)

Technical information
- Licensing authority: FCC
- Facility ID: 74310
- Class: C
- ERP: 100,000 watts
- HAAT: 369 meters (1,211 ft)
- Transmitter coordinates: 35°36′13″N 108°40′45″W

Links
- Public license information: Public file; LMS
- Webcast: Listen live (via iHeartRadio)
- Website: 999xtc.iheart.com

KXTC (99.9 FM) is a radio station broadcasting a rhythmic contemporary format. Licensed to serve Thoreau, New Mexico, United States, the station is owned by iHeartMedia, Inc.
