= KQEL =

- Alamogordo, New Mexico; United States
- Frequency: 107.9 MHz
- Branding: 107.9 Cool FM

Programming
- Format: Classic hits
- Affiliations: Premiere Networks; United Stations Radio Networks

Ownership
- Owner: Burt Broadcasting, Inc.
- Sister stations: KINN, KYEE, KZZX

History
- First air date: May 4, 2004
- Former call signs: KKBO
- Call sign meaning: Sounds like "Cool" (station branding)

Technical information
- Licensing authority: FCC
- Facility ID: 88083
- Class: A
- ERP: 3,000 watts
- HAAT: -181 meters (-593 feet)
- Transmitter coordinates: 32°53′13″N 105°57′04″W

Links
- Public license information: Public file; LMS
- Webcast: Listen Live
- Website: 1079coolfm.net

KQEL (107.9 FM, "Cool FM") is a radio station licensed to serve Alamogordo, New Mexico. The station is owned by Burt Broadcasting, Inc. It airs a classic hits music format.

The station was assigned the KQEL call letters by the Federal Communications Commission on May 4, 2004.
