= KMOU =

- Roswell, New Mexico; United States
- Frequency: 104.7 MHz
- Branding: 104.7 KMOU - The Legend

Programming
- Format: Country

Ownership
- Owner: Majestic Broadcasting, LLC
- Sister stations: KBCQ, KSFX, KZDB

Technical information
- Licensing authority: FCC
- Facility ID: 14927
- Class: C1
- ERP: 100,000 watts
- HAAT: 100 meters (330 ft)
- Transmitter coordinates: 33°24′49″N 104°22′49″W

Links
- Public license information: Public file; LMS
- Website: KMOU on Facebook

KMOU (104.7 FM) is a radio station broadcasting a Country music format. Licensed to Roswell, New Mexico, United States, the station is currently owned by Majestic Broadcasting, LLC.
