= KCQL =

- Aztec, New Mexico; United States
- Broadcast area: Four Corners area
- Frequency: 1340 kHz
- Branding: Fox Sports Radio 1340

Programming
- Format: Sports
- Affiliations: Fox Sports Radio

Ownership
- Owner: iHeartMedia, Inc.; (iHM Licenses, LLC)
- Sister stations: KOLZ, KDAG, KKFG, KTRA-FM

History
- First air date: 1959

Technical information
- Licensing authority: FCC
- Facility ID: 29520
- Class: C
- Power: 1,000 watts unlimited
- Transmitter coordinates: 36°49′15″N 108°00′01″W
- Translator: 93.9 K230AF (Kirtland)

Links
- Public license information: Public file; LMS
- Webcast: Listen Live
- Website: sports1340.iheart.com

KCQL (1340 AM, "Fox Sports Radio 1340") is a sports radio station licensed to Aztec, New Mexico in the Four Corners region.

The station is owned by iHeartMedia, Inc. under the name Capstar Partners, L.P.

Hosts on KCQL include Jim Rome, Chris Myers, J.T. the Brick, Ed Lacy, and Randy Simon.

Play-by-play action comes mainly from Westwood One and includes NFL football and the NCAA Division I men's basketball tournament. There is also local sports action not otherwise specified on the station's official website, possibly high school sports.
