= KTQM-FM =

Radio station in Clovis, New Mexico

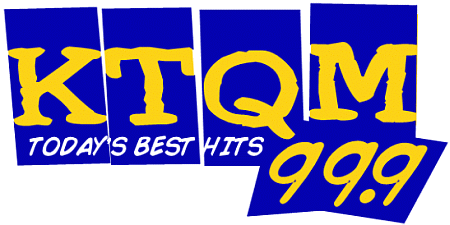
- Clovis, New Mexico; United States
- Broadcast area: Clovis area
- Frequency: 99.9 MHz
- Branding: KTQM 99.9

Programming
- Format: Adult contemporary
- Affiliations: ABC Radio

Ownership
- Owner: Rick Lee Keefer and David Lansford; (Zia Radio Group LLC)
- Sister stations: KCLV, KCLV-FM, KWKA

History
- First air date: 1963
- Call sign meaning: The TQM in KTQM stands for and represents TOP QUALITY MUSIC.

Technical information
- Licensing authority: FCC
- Facility ID: 14749
- Class: C1
- ERP: 100,000 watts
- HAAT: 91 meters (299 ft)
- Transmitter coordinates: 34°21′48″N 103°13′5″W

Links
- Public license information: Public file; LMS
- Website: 999ktqm.net

KTQM-FM (99.9 FM) is a radio station broadcasting an adult contemporary format. Licensed to Clovis, New Mexico, United States, the station serves eastern New Mexico and west Texas centered around the Clovis area. The station is part of the Zia Radio Group and features programming from ABC Radio.

The station was originally put on the air by famed record producer Norman Petty (produced Buddy Holly, The Fireballs and many more).
