= KGLX =

- Gallup, New Mexico; United States
- Frequency: 99.1 MHz
- Branding: KGLX 99.1 FM & 107.3 FM

Programming
- Format: Country
- Affiliations: Premiere Networks

Ownership
- Owner: iHeartMedia, Inc.; (iHM Licenses, LLC)
- Sister stations: KFMQ; KFXR-FM; KXTC

History
- First air date: 1989; 37 years ago
- Former call signs: KUUL (1985–1989)

Technical information
- Licensing authority: FCC
- Facility ID: 60596
- Class: C1
- ERP: 51,000 watts
- HAAT: 381 meters (1,250 ft)
- Transmitter coordinates: 35°36′18.1″N 108°41′13.3″W
- Repeater: 107.3 KFXR-FM (Chinle, Arizona)

Links
- Public license information: Public file; LMS
- Webcast: Listen live (via iHeartRadio)
- Website: 991kglx.iheart.com

KGLX (99.1 FM) is a radio station broadcasting a country music format. Licensed to serve Gallup, New Mexico, United States, the station is owned by iHeartMedia, Inc.
