= KWKA =

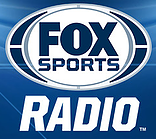
- Clovis, New Mexico; United States
- Broadcast area: Clovis, New Mexico
- Frequency: 680 kHz
- Branding: Fox Sports Radio on KWKA

Programming
- Format: Sports
- Affiliations: Fox Sports Radio

Ownership
- Owner: Rick Lee Keefer and David Lansford; (Zia Radio Group LLC)
- Sister stations: KCLV, KCLV-FM, KTQM-FM

History
- First air date: 1971

Technical information
- Licensing authority: FCC
- Facility ID: 14748
- Class: B
- Power: 500 watts
- Transmitter coordinates: 34°21′48″N 103°13′05″W

Links
- Public license information: Public file; LMS
- Website: www.999ktqm.net/sports

KWKA (680 AM) is a radio station licensed to serve Clovis, New Mexico. The station is owned by Rick Lee Keefer and David Lansford, through licensee Zia Radio Group LLC. It broadcasts a sports format.

The station was assigned the KWKA call sign by the Federal Communications Commission.

This radio station was founded by Norm Petty, producer for Buddy Holly and the Crickets and The Fireballs. The call sign KWKA was requested by Petty after a conversation with Beatle Paul McCartney, who said one of his favorite American radio stations was KWKH, in Louisiana. The station was sold to Zia Broadcasting in 2009, and then to Zia Radio Group effective April 1, 2022.
