= KLEA-FM (101.7 MHz) =

Radio station in Lovington, New Mexico, United States (1965–2017)

- Lovington, New Mexico; United States
- Frequency: 101.7 MHz
- Branding: Oldies 101.7

Programming
- Format: Defunct (formerly oldies)

Ownership
- Owner: Lea County Broadcasting Co.
- Sister stations: KLEA

History
- First air date: October 1965
- Last air date: June 30, 2017
- Call sign meaning: Lea County

Technical information
- Facility ID: 36852
- Class: C3
- ERP: 25,000 watts
- HAAT: 88 meters (289 ft)
- Transmitter coordinates: 32°56′30″N 103°19′12″W

KLEA-FM (101.7 FM) was a radio station broadcasting an oldies music format. Licensed to Lovington, New Mexico, United States, the station was owned by Lea County Broadcasting Co.

KLEA-FM signed on in October 1965. The station shut down on June 30, 2017; on October 31, 2017, KLEA-FM ceased all remaining operations. The license was surrendered to the Federal Communications Commission (FCC), which cancelled it on November 9, 2017. The call letters are currently assigned to a station in Hobbs, New Mexico.
