= KYAT =

- Gallup, New Mexico; United States
- Frequency: 94.5 MHz
- Branding: Ya'a'te'eh Diné

Programming
- Language: Navajo
- Format: Country

Ownership
- Owner: Millennium Media; (Millennium Media, Inc.)
- Sister stations: KXXI, KYVA, KYVA-FM

History
- First air date: October 19, 1974
- Former call signs: KGLP (1974–1977); KOVO (1977–1986); KKOR (1986–2010)

Technical information
- Licensing authority: FCC
- Facility ID: 35028
- Class: C0
- ERP: 100 kW
- HAAT: 420 meters (1,380 ft)
- Transmitter coordinates: 35°36′22.08″N 108°41′28.31″W
- Translator: K235BR (94.9 FM) Gallup East

Links
- Public license information: Public file; LMS
- Website: gallupradio.com

KYAT is a radio station on 94.5 FM in Gallup, New Mexico, United States. Owned and operated by Millennium Media, the station broadcasts a country music format in the Navajo language known as Ya'a'te'eh Diné (Navajo Country).

== History ==
94.5 FM was launched as KGLP on October 19, 1974, airing a country format. It was co-owned with KYVA (1230 AM), which had previously mixed Top 40 and country tunes, much to the chagrin of its air staff; the new country outlet allowed the two formats to be split. Both stations were sold to Road Runner Radio, Inc., owned by Russell Carpenter and George Malti, for $500,000 in 1977, and the FM's call letters were changed to KOVO on October 24. The station flipped to adult contemporary in 1986 and adopted the call letters KKOR.

In 2010, the call letters were changed to KYAT as the station began broadcasting full-time in the Navajo language, the first FM station to do so. Some program features remained in English, including news bulletins three times a day from the Navajo Times newspaper. Coverage was extended to Navajo-language play-by-play of high school basketball games in January 2017.

George Malti died in 2016 after owning KYVA and KYAT for 39 years.
