= KRDD =

- Roswell, New Mexico; United States
- Frequency: 1320 kHz

Ownership
- Owner: Carlos Espinoza

History
- First air date: 1963
- Last air date: October 4, 2021

Technical information
- Facility ID: 68131
- Class: D
- Power: 1,000 watts (day); 188 watts (night)
- Transmitter coordinates: 33°24′14″N 104°28′12″W

KRDD (1320 AM) was a radio station licensed to Roswell, New Mexico. The station was last owned by Carlos Espinoza.

The Federal Communications Commission cancelled KRDD's license on October 4, 2021, due to the station failing to file an application to renew its license.
