= KSFX (AM) =

Radio station in Roswell, New Mexico

Roswell, New Mexico; United States
- Frequency: 1230 kHz
- Branding: 92.5 KSFX

Programming
- Format: Classic rock
- Affiliations: Westwood One

Ownership
- Owner: Majestic Radio
- Sister stations: KBCQ-FM; KMOU; KZDB

History
- First air date: May 1947 (as KSWS)
- Former call signs: KSWS (1947–1961); KRSY (1961–1999); KPSA (1999–2007); KBCQ (2007–2017)

Technical information
- Licensing authority: FCC
- Facility ID: 14926
- Class: C
- Power: 620 watts day; 1,000 watts night
- Transmitter coordinates: 33°23′37.4″N 104°36′17.9″W
- Translator: 92.5 K223BH (Roswell)

Links
- Public license information: Public file; LMS

KSFX (1230 AM) is a radio station broadcasting a classic rock music format. Licensed to Roswell, New Mexico, United States, the station is owned by Majestic Communications LLC. and is programmed by longtime radio personality J.R. Law. It is simulcast on 92.5 FM and covers Chaves County, New Mexico.

== History ==
In the mid- to late 1970s and early 1980s, the station was operated on 1020 AM at the old KSWS facility northeast of Roswell. It was briefly identified as both K102 and KQ102 until receiving FCC approval to officially change the call letters to KBCQ in 1975, in order to take advantage of its similarity to the well-known San Diego station at the time, KCBQ. Nighttime power was boosted to 50 kW directional, covering the western United States. That location today operates as KCKN (1020 AM).

The station was assigned the call sign KPSA on August 27, 1999. On December 20, 1999, the license for the station and its sister station KPZE-FM were assigned by then-owner Dewey Matthew Runnels to Runnels Broadcasting System, LLC. On September 19, 2002, the station's license — along with those of KNFT, KNFT-FM, KNMZ, KPSA-FM, KPZE-FM, KRSY, and KRSY-FM — was assigned to Runnels Broadcasting as Debtor in Possession, following Runnels Broadcasting filing for Chapter 11 bankruptcy.

On January 25, 2007, the station changed its call sign to KBCQ. On July 20, 2017, the station changed its call sign to the current KSFX. On August 1, 2017, KSFX changed its format to classic rock.
