= KTRA-FM =

- Farmington, New Mexico; United States
- Broadcast area: Four Corners
- Frequency: 102.1 MHz
- Branding: 102 KTRA

Programming
- Format: Country
- Affiliations: Premiere Networks

Ownership
- Owner: iHeartMedia, Inc.; (iHM Licenses, LLC)
- Sister stations: KOLZ, KCQL, KDAG, KKFG

History
- First air date: September 11, 1985; 40 years ago

Technical information
- Licensing authority: FCC
- Facility ID: 16827
- Class: C
- ERP: 100,000 watts
- HAAT: 303 meters (994 ft)
- Transmitter coordinates: 36°48′52″N 107°53′34.2″W

Links
- Public license information: Public file; LMS
- Webcast: Listen Live
- Website: 102ktra.iheart.com

KTRA-FM (102.1 MHz) is a radio station broadcasting a country music format. Licensed to Farmington, New Mexico, United States, the station serves the Four Corners area. The station is currently owned by iHeartMedia, Inc. and features programming from Premiere Networks.

== History ==
The station was assigned the call letters KTRA on September 11, 1985.
