= KNMX =

Radio station in Las Vegas–Santa Fe, New Mexico

- Las Vegas, New Mexico; United States
- Broadcast area: Santa Fe and Northern New Mexico
- Frequency: 540 kHz
- Branding: K New Mexico

Programming
- Format: New Mexico music

Ownership
- Owner: Sangre De Cristo Broadcasting Co, Inc.
- Sister stations: KBQL, KMDS, KMDZ, KNMM

Technical information
- Licensing authority: FCC
- Facility ID: 58915
- Class: D
- Power: 5,000 watts day 20 watts night
- Transmitter coordinates: 35°34′25″N 105°10′17″W
- Translator: (99.9 MHz) K260DJ (Las Vegas)

Links
- Public license information: Public file; LMS
- Website: SDCradio.com

KNMX (540 kHz) is a commercial AM radio station in Las Vegas, New Mexico, serving the Santa Fe area. The station is owned by Sangre De Cristo Broadcasting Co, Inc. It broadcasts a Spanish language radio format of New Mexico music with some Regional Mexican and Ranchera music.

By day, KNMX is powered at 5,000 watts. But because 540 AM is a Mexican and Canadian clear-channel frequency, KNMX must reduce nighttime power to only 20 watts to prevent skywave interference to the dominant Class A stations on this frequency. It uses a directional antenna at all times. Programming is also heard on FM translator 99.9 MHz K260DJ.

== History ==
On April 11, 1979, San Miguel Broadcasting Company, Inc., filed a construction permit to build a new radio station at 540 kHz in Las Vegas. The Federal Communications Commission approved the construction permit in December, and the station began broadcasting in October 1980. It was the area's first Spanish-language radio outlet, though it took three years for KNMX to turn a profit.

San Miguel owned the station until 1993, when it filed for Chapter 7 bankruptcy. Sangre de Cristo acquired KNMX in 1996 for $235,000, after the station had been placed in trusteeship.
