= KSEL-FM =

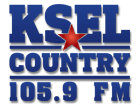
- Portales, New Mexico; United States
- Broadcast area: Clovis
- Frequency: 105.9 MHz

Programming
- Format: Country

Ownership
- Owner: Natalia Hudson; (Aegis Media Holdings, Inc.)
- Sister stations: KRMQ-FM, KSEL, KSMX-FM

History
- Former call signs: KKHJ (1986–1988)
- Call sign meaning: "Buy and Sell"

Technical information
- Licensing authority: FCC
- Facility ID: 4816
- Class: C1
- ERP: 100,000 watts
- HAAT: 141 meters (463 ft)
- Transmitter coordinates: 34°15′8″N 103°14′21″W

Links
- Public license information: Public file; LMS
- Website: www.kselcountry.com

KSEL-FM (105.9 FM) is a radio station licensed to Portales, New Mexico, United States, the station serves the Clovis area. The station is currently owned by Natalia Hudson, through licensee Aegis Media Holdings, Inc.

== History ==
The station was assigned the call sign KKHJ on 1986-11-01. On 1988-10-13, the station changed its call sign to the current KSEL.

The call sign KSEL was previously assigned to 93.7 FM (Now KLBB-FM) & 950 AM (Now KJTV-AM) Lubbock, Texas from 1956–1986. From the mid 1970s to 1986, KSEL-FM was owned and operated by Harris Enterprises of Hutchinson, KS. During this period, the station began with an automated Top 40 format before eventually simulcasting with its AM counterpart. From 1981 until 1985, KSEL-FM was rated as one of the premiere contemporary stations in the Lubbock market with notable personalities such as Stan Castles, Steve Coggins, Rick Gilbert and Ron Roberts. Other personalities included Jon Hart, Frank Torres, Laura McDonald and Gary Alexander. Harris Enterprises sold the station(s) in 1986 to Bakke Communications of Midland, TX., at which time the call sign was changed to KKIK, and the format changed to country. Bakke Communications filed for bankruptcy in 1995.
