= KZDB =

- Roswell, New Mexico; United States
- Broadcast area: Roswell, New Mexico
- Frequency: 100.5 MHz
- Branding: 100.5 Kool FM

Programming
- Format: Classic hits

Ownership
- Owner: Majestic Broadcasting, LLC
- Sister stations: KBCQ, KMOU, KSFX

History
- First air date: 1991 (as KSFX)
- Former call signs: KURQ (1988–1989, CP); KSFX (1989–2017)

Technical information
- Licensing authority: FCC
- Facility ID: 57720
- Class: C1
- ERP: 100,000 watts
- HAAT: 37 meters (121 ft)
- Transmitter coordinates: 33°23′37″N 104°36′16″W

Links
- Public license information: Public file; LMS

KZDB (100.5 FM) is a radio station licensed to Roswell, New Mexico, United States. The station is currently owned Majestic Broadcasting, LLC.

On August 1, 2017, KZDB changed their format from classic rock (which moved to KSFX 1230 AM) to classic hits, branded as "100.5 Kool FM".
