= KMDS (FM) =

- Las Vegas, New Mexico; United States
- Frequency: 107.1 MHz
- Branding: Groovin Oldies

Programming
- Format: Oldies

Ownership
- Owner: Sangre de Cristo Broadcasting
- Sister stations: KNMX, KMDZ, KBQL

Technical information
- Licensing authority: FCC
- Facility ID: 190438
- Class: A
- ERP: 6,000 watts
- HAAT: −68 meters (−223 ft)
- Transmitter coordinates: 35°34′48″N 105°12′59″W

Links
- Public license information: Public file; LMS

KMDS is a radio station broadcasting on a frequency of 107.1 MHz on the FM band. KMDS is currently owned by Sangre de Cristo Broadcasting.

The station broadcasts New Mexico State University sporting events.
