= KYVA-FM =

- Church Rock, New Mexico; United States
- Broadcast area: Gallup, New Mexico
- Frequency: 103.7 MHz
- Branding: Classic Hits 103.7

Programming
- Format: Classic hits

Ownership
- Owner: Millennium Media
- Sister stations: KXXI, KYAT, KYVA

History
- First air date: 1982

Technical information
- Licensing authority: FCC
- Facility ID: 61902
- Class: C0
- ERP: 100,000 watts
- HAAT: 420 meters (1,380 ft)
- Transmitter coordinates: 35°36′22″N 108°41′26″W
- Translator: 102.1 K271AB (Gallup)

Links
- Public license information: Public file; LMS
- Website: gallupradio.com

KYVA-FM (103.7 FM) is a radio station broadcasting a classic hits music format. Licensed to Church Rock, New Mexico, United States. The station is currently owned by Millennium Media.
