= KWES (AM) =

- Ruidoso, New Mexico; United States
- Frequency: 1450 kHz
- Branding: Bear Country 94.7

Programming
- Format: Country

Ownership
- Owner: Will Rooney; (MTD, Inc.)
- Sister stations: KBUY; KIDX; KNMB; KWES-FM

History
- First air date: August 15, 2008

Technical information
- Licensing authority: FCC
- Facility ID: 160917
- Class: C
- Power: 1,000 watts day; 910 watts night
- Transmitter coordinates: 33°19′34.3″N 105°40′15.9″W
- Translator: 94.7 K234AQ (Ruidoso)

Links
- Public license information: Public file; LMS
- Website: www.kwes.net

KWES (1450 AM) is a radio station licensed to Ruidoso, New Mexico, United States. The station airs a country music format, and is owned by Will Rooney, through licensee MTD, Inc.

== History ==
KWES signed on the air on August 15, 2008, with a classic country format. On January 19, 2009, KWES changed its format to sports with programming from Fox Sports Radio. On June 20, 2014, KWES changed its format from sports to Spanish adult hits, branded as "Juan 1450".

On February 19, 2018, KWES changed its format from Spanish adult hits to country, branded as "Bear Country 94.7".

Walton Stations sold its Rudioso cluster—KWES, KWES-FM, and KBUY—to Will Rooney's MTD Inc., owner of KNMB and KIDX, in 2024 as part of a $170,000 deal.
