= KNDN-FM =

- Shiprock, New Mexico; United States
- Frequency: 97.5 MHz
- Branding: Four Corners County

Programming
- Format: Country

Ownership
- Owner: KRJG, Inc.
- Sister stations: KGAK, KNDN, KWYK-FM

Technical information
- Licensing authority: FCC
- Facility ID: 189502
- Class: C1
- ERP: 1.5 kilowatts
- HAAT: 729.4 meters (2,393 ft)
- Transmitter coordinates: 36°27′39.8″N 109°05′45.9″W

Links
- Public license information: Public file; LMS
- Website: lemon-grass-094bc2f10.azurestaticapps.net

KNDN-FM is an FM radio station broadcasting on a frequency of 97.5 MHz and licensed to the city of Shiprock, New Mexico.

The format is known as "Four Corners Country". Big D and Bubba kick off your morning with the latest from Nashville, and Stan Lee gets you through the afternoon with great music and his homespun humor!
