= KBCQ-FM =

Contemporary hit radio station in Roswell, New Mexico

- Roswell, New Mexico; United States
- Frequency: 97.1 MHz
- Branding: Hot 97

Programming
- Format: Contemporary hit radio

Ownership
- Owner: Majestic Communications; (Majestic Broadcasting, LLC)
- Sister stations: KMOU, KSFX, KZDB

History
- First air date: October 5, 1977
- Former call signs: KRSY-FM (1977–1978); KRIZ (1978–1984); KCKN (1984–1987); KBCQ (1987–2006)

Technical information
- Licensing authority: FCC
- Facility ID: 57722
- Class: C1
- ERP: 100,000 watts
- HAAT: 110 meters (360 ft)
- Transmitter coordinates: 33°24′5″N 104°22′45″W

Links
- Public license information: Public file; LMS

KBCQ-FM (97.1 FM) is a radio station broadcasting a contemporary hit radio music format licensed to Roswell, New Mexico, United States. The station is currently owned by Majestic Communications.

== History ==
Troy Raymond Moran received the construction permit for a new radio station in Roswell on June 29, 1976. The new station, designated KRSY-FM and an adjunct to KRSY (1230 AM), went on the air October 5, 1977. A year later, on October 15, 1978, the station changed its call letters to KRIZ and began airing an album-oriented rock format. Two years later, Gary Acker and his Good News Broadcasting Company acquired KRIZ, resulting in a flip to contemporary religious music and other programming from local churches. The sale of KRIZ to Acker formed half of a transaction by which Moran acquired the construction permit for channel 14 in Amarillo, Texas and Acker received the radio station as well as $325,000 in cash.

Gary L. Acker sold KRIZ to Ronald Strother for $550,000 in 1984. On June 1 of that year, the station changed its call letters to KCKN and ditched its religious programming, which had not been very profitable, to adopt a 24-hour country music format; KRIZ, in contrast, only operated from 6 a.m. to 6 p.m. A year later, Strother sold the station to Sudbrink Broadcasting of New Mexico for $500,000. Sudbrink traded KCKN and KBCQ (1020 AM) to National Capital Christian Broadcasting the next year in order to acquire WTLL, a television station it owned in Richmond, Virginia; National Capital Christian then sold the Roswell radio pair to Ardman Communications for $600,000.

In April 1987, Ardman flipped the formats of the two stations: KBCQ and its contemporary hit radio format moved from 1020 AM to 97.1 FM, while KCKN's country programming moved to 1020 AM. In 1990, the group agreed to sell its Roswell stations and WVSR-AM-FM in Charleston, West Virginia, for $5.75 million to ML Media. KCKN-KBCQ were spun off to Roswell Radio, owned by John and Trisha Dunn, in 1993 for $600,000.

In 2010, Roswell Radio went into receivership. Receiver Tasha Ingalls ultimately acquired Roswell Radio's six stations in Roswell and Tucumcari in 2010 for $340,000, after having been the only bidder in the bankruptcy proceedings. A year later, the Ingalls family sold the stations for $260,000 to Majestic Communications, owned by the Matteucci family.
