= KNMJ =

- Eunice, New Mexico; United States
- Broadcast area: Hobbs, New Mexico
- Frequency: 100.9 MHz
- Branding: KNMJ TBird Radio

Programming
- Format: Classic hits / NMJC Play by Play

Ownership
- Owner: New Mexico Junior College

History
- First air date: 1995 (as KYRK)
- Former call signs: KNJT (2/93-4/93); KYRK (1993–1999); KEJL (1999–2014); KPER (2014–2015)
- Call sign meaning: K New Mexico Junior (college)

Technical information
- Licensing authority: FCC
- Facility ID: 40206
- Class: C2
- ERP: 50,000 watts
- HAAT: 111 meters (364 ft)
- Transmitter coordinates: 32°28′05″N 103°09′27″W

Links
- Public license information: Public file; LMS
- Website: Official Website

KNMJ (100.9 FM) is a radio station licensed to serve Eunice, New Mexico, United States. The station, established in 1995, is currently owned by New Mexico Junior College.

== History ==
This station received its original construction permit from the Federal Communications Commission on December 29, 1992. The new station was assigned the KNJT call sign by the FCC on February 26, 1993. That initial call sign was changed to KYRK on April 16, 1993. KYRK received its license to cover from the FCC on July 27, 1995.

In December 1998, license holder Mark C. Nolte announced an agreement to transfer this station to Fivestar Enterprises L.C. The deal was approved by the FCC on February 8, 1999, and the transaction was consummated on February 24, 1999. The new owners had the FCC change the station's call sign to KEJL on March 15, 1999.

On November 22, 2013, Fivestar Enterprises assigned KEJL's license to related licensee Fivestar Media Corporation.

On September 1, 2014, the station swapped call signs with AM 1110 KPER. On September 29, 2014, 100.9 went silent as the Shared Services Agreement between Noalmark and Fivestar Enterprises came to an end. Fivestar donated the station's license to New Mexico Junior College Foundation effective June 23, 2015. The station's call sign was changed to the current KNMJ on August 31, 2015.

Effective January 27, 2021, the Foundation transferred KNMJ's license to New Mexico Junior College for $10.

The Station General Manager is Susan Fine.

== Engineering ==
Facility designs, equipment selection and technical installation made in consultation with David Stewart of Moving Target Consulting Works.
