= KATK-FM =

Radio station in Carlsbad, New Mexico

- Carlsbad, New Mexico; United States
- Frequency: 92.1 MHz
- Branding: KATK 92.1 FM

Programming
- Format: Country music
- Affiliations: ABC Radio, Jones Radio Network

Ownership
- Owner: Carlsbad Radio, Inc.
- Sister stations: KAMQ, KATK, KCDY

History
- Former call signs: KATK(FM) (1980–1980); KATK (1980–1987)

Technical information
- Licensing authority: FCC
- Facility ID: 54514
- Class: A
- ERP: 6,000 watts
- HAAT: 58.0 meters (190.3 ft)
- Transmitter coordinates: 32°27′2″N 104°12′47″W

Links
- Public license information: Public file; LMS
- Website: carlsbadradio.com/katak-fm/

KATK-FM (92.1 FM) is a radio station broadcasting a country music format. Licensed to Carlsbad, New Mexico, United States, the station serves the Carlsbad area. The station is currently owned by Carlsbad Radio, Inc. and features programming from ABC Radio and Jones Radio Network.

== History ==
The station went on the air as KATK (FM) on June 2, 1980. On September 22, 1980, the station changed its call sign to KATK, and on January 1, 1987, to the current KATK,
