= KCLV-FM =

Radio station in Clovis, New Mexico

- Clovis, New Mexico; United States
- Frequency: 99.1 MHz
- Branding: Clovis' Country Station

Programming
- Format: Country

Ownership
- Owner: Rick Lee Keefer and David Lansford; (Zia Radio Group LLC)
- Sister stations: KCLV, KTQM-FM, KWKA

History
- First air date: January 6, 1970 (as KMTY-FM)
- Former call signs: KMTY-FM (1970–1978); KKQQ (1978–1981)

Technical information
- Licensing authority: FCC
- Facility ID: 74563
- Class: C1
- ERP: 100,000 watts
- HAAT: 70 meters (230 ft)
- Transmitter coordinates: 34°23′18″N 103°11′07″W

Links
- Public license information: Public file; LMS
- Website: KCLV-FM website

KCLV-FM (99.1 FM, "Country 99") is a radio station licensed to serve Clovis, New Mexico. The station is owned by Rick Lee Keefer and David Lansford, through licensee Zia Radio Group LLC. It airs a country music format.

== History ==
99.1 went on air January 6, 1970, as KMTY-FM, the second FM for Clovis, owned by Friend Radio, Inc. The Frequently Modulated Radio Company acquired KMTY-FM in 1977 and changed its call sign to KKQQ the next year. The station was then assigned the KCLV-FM call sign by the Federal Communications Commission on December 2, 1981.
