= KCLV (AM) =

- Clovis, New Mexico; United States
- Frequency: 1240 kHz
- Branding: Talk 1240

Programming
- Format: Talk
- Affiliations: Genesis Communications Network; Premiere Networks; Radio America; Salem Radio Network; USA Radio Network

Ownership
- Owner: Rick Lee Keefer and David Lansford; (Zia Radio Group LLC)
- Sister stations: KCLV-FM, KTQM-FM, KWKA

History
- First air date: February 27, 1952
- Call sign meaning: "Clovis"

Technical information
- Licensing authority: FCC
- Facility ID: 74565
- Class: C
- Power: 1,000 watts
- Transmitter coordinates: 34°22′41″N 103°12′22″W

Links
- Public license information: Public file; LMS
- Webcast: Listen live
- Website: kclvsports.com

KCLV (1240 kHz) is an AM radio station licensed to Clovis, New Mexico, United States, airing a talk format. The station is currently owned by Rick Lee Keefer and David Lansford, through licensee Zia Radio Group LLC.

== History ==
New-Tex Broadcasting, a partnership of Wallace Simpson and H. S. Boles, filed with the Federal Communications Commission on February 8, 1950, for a new 100-watt radio station to serve Clovis on 1240 kHz. After going into comparative hearing, the application was approved on August 29, 1951, and subsequently modified to specify 250 watts. KCLV began broadcasting on February 27, 1952. Just months after the station got on air, Simpson and Boles dissolved their partnership, with Simpson buying out his partner. The next year, Odis L. Echols and Odis L. Echols Jr., former residents of Clovis, purchased the station from Simpson and returned to the city. The elder Echols purchased full ownership three years later. During this time, a new Methodist church in Clovis held its children's Sunday school classes in the KCLV transmitter building while permanent facilities were built.

In September 1961, the station increased power from 250 to 1,000 watts during daylight hours, relocating its transmitter site in 1965. The Echols sold the station in 1971 to Zia Broadcasting Company—owned by Lonnie Allsup, the owner of Allsup's convenience stores—for $230,000. In 1981, Zia acquired KKQQ, an FM radio station in Clovis, and relaunched it as country music KCLV-FM.

KCLV switched from classic country to sports using ESPN Radio in 2001. The sports format remained until 2011, when it began broadcasting a talk format.

Lonnie Allsup died in 2018. Effective April 1, 2022, the Allsup family sold the Zia Radio Group to Rick Keefer, who had been the general manager, and David Lansford, marking the first change in ownership of KCLV in more than 50 years. The five stations—KCLV, KCLV-FM, KWKA, KTQM-FM, and KQTY-FM in Borger, Texas—sold for $200,000.
