= KWES-FM =

- Ruidoso, New Mexico; United States
- Broadcast area: Capitan, New Mexico; Carrizozo, New Mexico
- Frequency: 93.5 MHz
- Branding: Classic Country 93.5

Programming
- Format: Classic country

Ownership
- Owner: Will Rooney; (MTD, Inc.)
- Sister stations: KBUY; KIDX; KNMB; KWES

History
- First air date: 1984
- Former call signs: KTNT (1983–1987); KBUY-FM (1987–1990); KWES (1990–2007)
- Call sign meaning: "West"

Technical information
- Licensing authority: FCC
- Facility ID: 70824
- Class: C3
- ERP: 25,000 watts
- HAAT: 57 meters (187 ft)
- Transmitter coordinates: 33°23′12.2″N 105°40′15.9″W

Links
- Public license information: Public file; LMS
- Website: www.kwes.net/kwes--93.5-fm.html

KWES-FM (93.5 FM, "The West 93.5") is a radio station licensed to serve Ruidoso, New Mexico. The station is owned by Will Rooney, through licensee MTD, Inc. It airs a classic country music format.

== History ==
The station was assigned the KWES-FM call sign by the Federal Communications Commission on July 17, 2007. Before this, it had held the adorned KWES call sign since November 15, 1990.

Walton Stations sold its Rudioso cluster—KWES-FM, KWES AM, and KBUY—to Will Rooney's MTD Inc., owner of KNMB and KIDX, in 2024 as part of a $170,000 deal.
