= KYVA (AM) =

- Gallup, New Mexico; United States
- Frequency: 1230 kHz
- Branding: Rockin Oldies KYVA

Programming
- Format: Oldies

Ownership
- Owner: Millennium Media
- Sister stations: KXXI, KYAT, KYVA-FM

History
- First air date: 1959
- Former call signs: KYVA (1949-1999); KTHR (1999–2004)

Technical information
- Licensing authority: FCC
- Facility ID: 35026
- Class: C
- Power: 920 watts
- Transmitter coordinates: 35°32′2″N 108°42′18″W
- Translator: 98.3 K252FM (Gallup South)

Links
- Public license information: Public file; LMS
- Website: gallupradio.com

KYVA (1230 AM) is a radio station licensed to Gallup, New Mexico, United States, broadcasting an oldies music format in AM stereo. The station is currently owned by Millennium Media. The station broadcasts Major League Baseball games as a member of the Los Angeles Dodgers Radio Network.

== History ==
KYVA was first licensed on October 23, 1949. The station was assigned the call letters KTHR on June 17, 1999. On March 1, 2004, the station changed its call sign back to KYVA.
