= KSEL (AM) =

- Portales, New Mexico; United States
- Broadcast area: Clovis, New Mexico
- Frequency: 1450 kHz
- Branding: Cow Country AM 1450

Programming
- Format: Classic country
- Affiliations: Westwood One

Ownership
- Owner: Richard Hudson; (Global One Media, Inc.)
- Sister stations: KRMQ-FM, KSEL-FM, KSMX-FM

History
- Call sign meaning: Buy and Sell

Technical information
- Licensing authority: FCC
- Facility ID: 4815
- Class: C
- Power: 950 watts
- Transmitter coordinates: 34°11′51″N 103°19′24″W

Links
- Public license information: Public file; LMS
- Website: www.cowcountryradio.com

KSEL (1450 AM) is a radio station licensed to Portales, New Mexico, United States. The station, owned by Richard Hudson, through licensee Global One Media, Inc., serves the Clovis area and carries a Classic Country Music format. and features programming from Westwood One.

== History ==
The call sign KSEL was previously assigned to 93.7 FM (Now KLBB-FM) & 950 AM (Now KJTV-AM) Lubbock, Texas from 1956 to 1986. KSEL 1450 AM Went Off The Air Due to Broken Transmitter or Tower.
