= KNDN (AM) =

Farmington, New Mexico; United States
- Broadcast area: Four Corners area
- Frequency: 960 kHz
- Branding: The Navajo Station

Programming
- Format: World Ethnic

Ownership
- Owner: Basin Broadcasting Co.
- Sister stations: KNDN-FM

Technical information
- Licensing authority: FCC
- Facility ID: 4040
- Class: D
- Power: 5,000 watts day 163 watts night
- Transmitter coordinates: 36°43′48″N 108°13′47″W
- Translator: (100.1 MHz) K261FB (Farmington)

Links
- Public license information: Public file; LMS
- Website: icy-tree-02d4dfa10.azurestaticapps.net

KNDN (960 AM) is a radio station broadcasting in Navajo, one of three such stations in the world. Licensed to Farmington, New Mexico, United States, the station serves the Four Corners area. The station is currently owned by Basin Broadcasting Co.
