= KIDX =

- Ruidoso, New Mexico; United States
- Frequency: 101.5 MHz
- Branding: The Kid

Programming
- Format: Classic rock
- Affiliations: Westwood One

Ownership
- Owner: MTD, Inc.
- Sister stations: KNMB; KWES; KWES-FM

History
- First air date: 2000
- Call sign meaning: "Kid"

Technical information
- Licensing authority: FCC
- Facility ID: 87732
- Class: C2
- ERP: 920 watts
- HAAT: 869 meters (2,851 ft)
- Transmitter coordinates: 33°24′16″N 105°46′54.3″W

Links
- Public license information: Public file; LMS
- Webcast: Listen live
- Website: www.kidxradio.com

KIDX (101.5 FM, "The Kid") is a radio station licensed to serve Ruidoso, New Mexico, United States. The station, established in 2000, is owned by MTD, Inc.

KIDX broadcasts a classic rock music format featuring the satellite-fed "Classic Rock" service from Westwood One.

== History ==
This station received its original construction permit from the Federal Communications Commission on April 21, 2000. The new station was assigned the KIDX call sign by the FCC on May 8, 2000. KIDX received its license to cover from the FCC on June 23, 2000.
