= KOLZ (FM) =

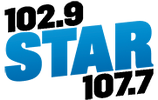
- Kirtland, New Mexico; United States
- Broadcast area: Four Corners
- Frequency: 102.9 MHz
- Branding: Star 102.9 & 107.7

Programming
- Format: Top 40 (CHR)
- Affiliations: Premiere Networks

Ownership
- Owner: iHeartMedia, Inc.; (iHM Licenses, LLC)
- Sister stations: KCQL, KDAG, KKFG, KTRA-FM

History
- First air date: November 1999
- Former call signs: KAZX (1998–2021)

Technical information
- Licensing authority: FCC
- Facility ID: 76749
- Class: C0
- ERP: 100,000 watts
- HAAT: 303 meters (994 ft)
- Transmitter coordinates: 36°48′52″N 107°53′34.2″W
- Translator: see below

Links
- Public license information: Public file; LMS
- Webcast: Listen Live
- Website: Official website

KOLZ (102.9 MHz) is a top 40 (CHR) FM radio station licensed to Kirtland, New Mexico. The station serves the Four Corners area and is currently owned by iHeartMedia, Inc. It features local programming, as well as programming from Premiere Networks, including the Elvis Duran & the Morning Show, Remix Top 30 Most Requested Live, the American Top 40 and On Air With Ryan Seacrest.

The station signed on in November 1999 as KAZX, playing Christmas music; aside from this stunt, the station has featured the "Star" contemporary hit radio format for its entire history. The KOLZ call sign was moved to this station from KABQ-FM in Corrales in 2021.

== FM translator ==
KOLZ formerly relayed its signal to an FM translator broadcasting on 107.7 MHz in order to improve coverage in Durango. The license was cancelled on February 9, 2023.

Call sign	Frequency	City of license	FID	ERP (W)	HAAT	Class	FCC info
K299AJ	107.7 FM	Durango, Colorado	29594	150	122 m (400 ft)	D	LMS
