= KTUM =

- Tatum, New Mexico; United States
- Broadcast area: Southeast New Mexico; West Texas
- Frequency: 107.1 MHz
- Branding: B 107 The Blaze

Programming
- Format: Top 40 (CHR)

Ownership
- Owner: MTD Radio Inc.; (MTD, Inc.)
- Sister stations: KWMW

History
- First air date: 2003
- Call sign meaning: Tatum

Technical information
- Facility ID: 88798
- Class: C1
- ERP: 100,000 watts
- HAAT: 280 meters (920 ft)
- Transmitter coordinates: 32°52′49.2″N 103°41′6.7″W

Links
- Webcast: Listen live
- Website: www.b107theblaze.com

KTUM (107.1 FM, "B 107 The Blaze") is an American radio station licensed to serve Tatum, New Mexico, United States. The station, established in 2003, is owned by MTD Radio Inc. and the broadcast license is held by MTD, Inc. KTUM shares a broadcast tower with sister station KWMW.

KTUM formerly broadcast an active rock music format that originally featured the satellite-fed "The Nerve" service from Citadel Media. Since the network closed in 2013, KTUM was programmed locally while keeping the "Nerve" brand. KTUM now broadcasts a Top 40 (CHR) format.

== History ==
Former branding

This station received its original construction permit from the Federal Communications Commission on November 6, 2000. The new station was assigned the KTUM call sign by the FCC on November 20, 2000. KTUM received its license to cover from the FCC on February 25, 2004.
