= KSMX-FM =

- Clovis, New Mexico; United States
- Broadcast area: Clovis area
- Frequency: 107.5 MHz
- Branding: Mix 107.5

Programming
- Format: Hot adult contemporary

Ownership
- Owner: Richard Hudson; (Global One Media, Inc.)
- Sister stations: KRMQ-FM, KSEL, KSEL-FM

History
- First air date: 1981
- Former call signs: KZZO (1984–1993); KERC (1993–1994); KPWX (1994–1995); KSMX (1995–2007)

Technical information
- Licensing authority: FCC
- Facility ID: 64495
- Class: C1
- ERP: 100,000 watts
- HAAT: 165.0 meters (541.3 ft)
- Transmitter coordinates: 34°11′34″N 103°16′44″W

Links
- Public license information: Public file; LMS
- Website: heymix.com

KSMX-FM (107.5 FM) is a radio station broadcasting a hot adult contemporary format. Licensed to Clovis, New Mexico, United States, the station serves the Clovis area. The station is currently owned by Richard Hudson, through licensee Global One Media, Inc.

== History ==
The station went on the air as KICA-FM in 1981. The station was sold to Triton Broadcasting in 1982, and the call sign was changed to KCPK (K-Clovis-Portales-K108). The station was sold to Tabor Broadcasting in 1984 (Jim Tabor once PD of KLIF Dallas, WSGN Birmingham, and owner of KINT AM/FM El Paso). The call sign was changed to KZZO on 1984-09-04. KZZO was an adaptation of "ZOO". There was a well known Dallas Texas station called KZEW, and the station studios were located at 1000 Sycamore across the street from the Clovis Zoo. On 1993-09-01, the station changed its call sign to KERC, on 1994-03-01 to KPWX, on 1995-07-25 to KSMX, and on 2007-09-24 to the current KSMX-FM.
