= KBQL =

- Las Vegas, New Mexico; United States
- Frequency: 92.7 MHz
- Branding: 92.7 The Bull

Programming
- Format: Country

Ownership
- Owner: Matias C Martinez and Martha Martinez; (Sangre de Cristo Broadcasting Co., Inc.)
- Sister stations: KNMX, KMDS, KMDZ

History
- First air date: June 2009

Technical information
- Licensing authority: FCC
- Facility ID: 165327
- Class: C3
- ERP: 23,000 watts
- HAAT: 104 meters (341 ft)
- Transmitter coordinates: 35°34′23″N 105°10′16″W

Links
- Public license information: Public file; LMS
- Website: www.sdcradio.com

KBQL (92.7 FM) is a radio station licensed to Las Vegas, New Mexico, United States. The station is currently owned by Matias C. Martinez and Martha Martinez, through licensee Sangre de Cristo Broadcasting Co., Inc.
