= KLEA (AM) =

Radio station in Lovington, New Mexico (1952–2017)

- Lovington, New Mexico; United States
- Frequency: 630 kHz
- Branding: True Country 630

Programming
- Format: Defunct (formerly country)

Ownership
- Owner: Lea County Broadcasting Co.
- Sister stations: KLEA-FM

History
- First air date: December 25, 1952
- Last air date: June 30, 2017
- Call sign meaning: Lea County

Technical information
- Facility ID: 36853
- Class: D
- Power: 500 watts day; 69 watts night
- Transmitter coordinates: 32°56′30″N 103°19′12″W

KLEA (630 AM; "True Country") was a radio station broadcasting a country music format. Licensed to Lovington, New Mexico, United States, the station was owned by Lea County Broadcasting Co.

KLEA signed on December 25, 1952. The station shut down on June 30, 2017; on October 31, 2017, KLEA ceased all remaining operations. The license was surrendered to the Federal Communications Commission (FCC), which cancelled it on November 9, 2017.
