= KXXI =

- Gallup, New Mexico; United States
- Frequency: 93.7 MHz
- Branding: 93X

Programming
- Format: Classic rock

Ownership
- Owner: Millennium Media, Inc.
- Sister stations: KYAT, KYVA, KYVA-FM

History
- First air date: 1975
- Former call signs: KQNM (1975–1996)

Technical information
- Licensing authority: FCC
- Facility ID: 35029
- Class: C0
- ERP: 100,000 watts
- HAAT: 420 meters (1,380 ft)
- Transmitter coordinates: 35°36′22″N 108°41′26″W

Links
- Public license information: Public file; LMS
- Website: gallupradio.com

KXXI (93.7 FM, "93X") is a radio station licensed to serve Gallup, New Mexico, United States. The station is owned by Millennium Media, Inc.

KXXI broadcasts a classic rock music format branded as "93X".

As KQNM, the station had a Top 40 format branded “KQ93” through the early 1990s.

In March 1994, the Gallup Broadcasting Company reached an agreement to sell this station to KKOR/KYVA, Inc. The deal was approved by the FCC on June 7, 1994, and the transaction was consummated on the same day. The company later changed its name to Millennium Media, Inc.

The station was assigned the KXXI call sign by the Federal Communications Commission on November 25, 1996.
