= KPZA-FM =

- Jal, New Mexico; United States
- Broadcast area: Hobbs, New Mexico
- Frequency: 103.7 MHz
- Branding: La Zeta

Programming
- Format: Regional Mexican

Ownership
- Owner: Noalmark Broadcasting Corporation

Technical information
- Licensing authority: FCC
- Facility ID: 31594
- Class: C1
- ERP: 100,000 watts
- HAAT: 113 meters (371 ft)
- Transmitter coordinates: 32°25′53″N 103°9′8″W

Links
- Public license information: Public file; LMS
- Webcast: Listen live
- Website: hobbsamerica.com

KPZA-FM is a radio station airing a Regional Mexican format licensed to Jal, New Mexico, broadcasting on 103.7 FM. The station serves the Hobbs, New Mexico area, and is owned by Noalmark Broadcasting Corporation.

== Engineering ==
Chief Engineer is Kenneth S. Fine, CPBE
