= KAMQ =

Radio station in Carlsbad, New Mexico

- Carlsbad, New Mexico; United States
- Frequency: 1240 kHz
- Branding: Q96.3

Programming
- Format: Mainstream rock

Ownership
- Owner: KAMQ, Inc.
- Sister stations: KATK; KATK-FM; KCDY

History
- First air date: June 25, 1979

Technical information
- Licensing authority: FCC
- Facility ID: 33300
- Class: C
- Power: 1,000 watts
- Transmitter coordinates: 32°23′43″N 104°14′48″W
- Translator: 96.3 K242DB (Carlsbad)

Links
- Public license information: Public file; LMS
- Website: carlsbadradio.com/kamq/

KAMQ (1240 AM) is a radio station broadcasting a mainstream rock format. Licensed to Carlsbad, New Mexico, United States, the station serves the Carlsbad area. The station is owned by KAMQ, Inc.

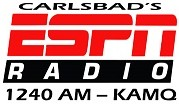
Logo as an ESPN Radio affiliate
