= KBIM-FM =

- Roswell, New Mexico; United States
- Broadcast area: Roswell; Carlsbad; Hobbs
- Frequency: 94.9 MHz
- Branding: 94.9 the Country Giant

Programming
- Format: Country music
- Affiliations: Fox News Radio; Compass Media Networks

Ownership
- Owner: Noalmark Broadcasting Corporation
- Sister stations: KBIM

History
- First air date: June 1959

Technical information
- Licensing authority: FCC
- Facility ID: 34854
- Class: C
- ERP: 100,000 watts
- HAAT: 573 meters (1,880 ft)
- Transmitter coordinates: 33°3′20.4″N 103°49′13.8″W

Links
- Public license information: Public file; LMS
- Webcast: Listen live
- Website: www.kbimradio.com

KBIM-FM (94.9 MHz, "The Country Giant") is a radio station broadcasting a country music music format. Licensed to Roswell, New Mexico, United States, the station is owned by Noalmark Broadcasting Corporation.

== History ==
The station signed on in June 1959. On November 30, 2007, the station's license was assigned by King Broadcasting Company, Inc. to its current owner, Noalmark Broadcasting, along with that of its sister station KBIM.
