= KMDZ (FM) =

- Las Vegas, New Mexico; United States
- Frequency: 96.7 MHz
- Branding: Classic Hitz Z 96 FM

Programming
- Format: Classic hits

Ownership
- Owner: Sangre de Cristo Broadcasting
- Sister stations: KNMX, KMDS, KBQL

Technical information
- Licensing authority: FCC
- Facility ID: 88975
- Class: C3
- ERP: 6,500 watts
- HAAT: −68 meters (−223 ft)
- Transmitter coordinates: 35°34′48″N 105°12′59″W

Links
- Public license information: Public file; LMS
- Website: sdcradio.com

KMDZ is a radio station broadcasting on a frequency of 96.7 MHz on the FM band. KMDZ is currently owned by Sangre de Cristo Broadcasting. It features a classic hits format known as Classic Hitz Z 96 FM.
