= KCKN =

Radio station in Roswell, New Mexico

Roswell, New Mexico; United States
- Frequency: 1020 kHz

Programming
- Language: Spanish
- Format: Christian radio

Ownership
- Owner: Radio Vision Cristiana Subsidiary Corp.

History
- First air date: December 1965 (as KSWS)
- Former call signs: KSWS (1965–1975); KBCQ (1975–1987); KCKN (1987–2000); KXEM (2000); KINF (2000–2006)
- Call sign meaning: "Kickin" (former country format)

Technical information
- Licensing authority: FCC
- Facility ID: 57721
- Class: B
- Power: 50,000 watts
- Transmitter coordinates: 33°27′53.35″N 104°29′59.89″W

Links
- Public license information: Public file; LMS
- Website: www.radiovision.net

KCKN (1020 kHz) is an AM radio station broadcasting a Spanish-language Christian radio format in Roswell, New Mexico. It is owned by Radio Vision Cristiana Subsidiary Corp. Much of the programming is also heard on co-owned WWRV (1330 AM) in New York City.

KCKN is powered at 50,000 watts, the maximum for AM stations licensed by the Federal Communications Commission (FCC). It is a Class B outlet, required to protect Class A clear channel station KDKA in Pittsburgh. KCKN uses a directional antenna at all times, with a three-tower array by day and a six-tower array at night. KCKN's transmitter is on La Luz Road at Old Clovis Highway in Roswell.

== History ==
The station signed on the air for the first time in December 1965 under the call sign KSWS. It was co-owned with KSWS-TV (now KOBR). It changed its call sign to KBCQ on June 30, 1975. A sister FM station was purchased in 1986. KBCQ at the time programmed Top 40 and the FM station had the KCKN call sign and a country music format. On April 20 1987, the call signs and formats of the two stations were flipped and 1020 became KCKN Country and the FM became KBCQ-FM Top 40. In the early 1990s, KCKN switched to a soft adult contemporary format with a large news commitment. Religious programming was carried at night for years.

The call sign was changed to KXEM on November 13, 2000; and to KINF on December 1, 2000. As KINF, the station aired a news/talk format. In late August 2005, while operating under a local marketing agreement (LMA), KINF was off the air due to technical problems. The LMA was ended; the station reverted to the KCKN calls on January 12, 2006, and the station signed back on the air in early February 2006 programming classic country music. In 2012, the station was sold to Radio Vision Cristiana Subsidiary Corp. KCKN switched to Spanish language Christian radio.

On June 11, 2018, the transmitter for KCKN caught fire and badly damaged the transmitter building. KCKN requested a special temporary authority (STA) to operate an auxiliary transmitter. The FCC approved the request; however, the fire department forbade using it until electrical inspections took place. KCKN remained silent until inspections took place.
