= KATK (AM) =

Radio station in Carlsbad, New Mexico

- Carlsbad, New Mexico; United States
- Broadcast area: Santa Fe area
- Frequency: 740 kHz
- Branding: 93.9 FM La Raza

Programming
- Format: Classic Regional Mexican
- Affiliations: Westwood One

Ownership
- Owner: Carlsbad Radio, Inc.
- Sister stations: KAMQ, KATK-FM, KCDY

History
- First air date: May 17, 1950
- Former call signs: KPBM (1950–1968); KBAD (1968–1987)

Technical information
- Licensing authority: FCC
- Facility ID: 54513
- Class: B
- Power: 1,000 watts (daytime); 500 watts (nighttime)
- Transmitter coordinates: 32°27′2″N 104°12′47″W
- Translator: 93.9 K230CI (Carlsbad)

Links
- Public license information: Public file; LMS
- Website: KATK website

KATK (740 AM) is a radio station broadcasting a Mexican music format. Licensed to Carlsbad, New Mexico, United States, the station serves the Santa Fe area. The station is currently owned by Carlsbad Radio, Inc. and features programming from Westwood One. The stations logo is very similar to the La Raza stations that are owned by the Spanish Broadcasting System
