= KEJL =

Radio station in Humble City–Hobbs, New Mexico

- Humble City, New Mexico; United States
- Broadcast area: Hobbs, New Mexico
- Frequency: 1110 kHz
- Branding: Eagle 100.5

Programming
- Format: Classic rock

Ownership
- Owner: Noalmark Broadcasting Corporation
- Sister stations: KLEA

History
- First air date: 1971
- Former call signs: KCIA (1971–1981); KYKK (1981–2014); KPER (2014)

Technical information
- Licensing authority: FCC
- Facility ID: 48953
- Class: D
- Power: 5,000 watts (days only); 2,500 watts (critical hours)
- Transmitter coordinates: 32°48′59″N 103°13′56″W
- Translator: 100.5 K263AZ (Hobbs)

Links
- Public license information: Public file; LMS
- Website: www.hobbsamerica.com/entertainment/local-radio

KEJL is a radio station airing a classic rock format licensed to Humble City, New Mexico, broadcasting on 1110 AM. The station serves the Hobbs, New Mexico area, and is owned by Noalmark Broadcasting Corporation.

== Engineering ==
Chief Engineer is Kenneth S. Fine, CPBE
