= KPZE-FM =

Radio station in Carlsbad, New Mexico

- Carlsbad, New Mexico; United States
- Broadcast area: Carlsbad, New Mexico; Artesia, New Mexico; Roswell, New Mexico
- Frequency: 106.1 MHz
- Branding: La Pantera 106.1

Programming
- Format: Regional Mexican

Ownership
- Owner: Pecos Valley Broadcasting Company

History
- First air date: January 2000
- Former call signs: KPZA-FM (2000–2002)

Technical information
- Licensing authority: FCC
- Facility ID: 77842
- Class: C1
- ERP: 100,000 watts
- HAAT: 289 meters (948 ft)
- Transmitter coordinates: 32°47′38″N 104°12′29″W

Links
- Public license information: Public file; LMS
- Webcast: Listen Live
- Website: lapantera1061.com

KPZE-FM(106.1 MHz) is a radio station airing a Regional Mexican format licensed to Carlsbad, New Mexico. The station is owned by Pecos Valley Broadcasting Company.

== History ==
Previous logo

The station began broadcasting in January 2000, and held the call sign KPSA-FM. It aired a Spanish hits format, branded "Que Pasa". On October 22, 2002, its call sign was changed to KPZE-FM. By 2008, the station was airing a regional Mexican format branded "La Gran D". By 2014, the station was branded "Fierro 106.1". By December 2024, the station rebranded to "La Pantera 106.1".
