= KLEA (FM) =

Radio station in Hobbs, New Mexico

- Hobbs, New Mexico; United States
- Broadcast area: Hobbs, New Mexico
- Frequency: 95.7 MHz
- Branding: Kool 95.7

Programming
- Format: Classic hits

Ownership
- Owner: Noalmark Broadcasting Corporation
- Sister stations: KEJL, KIXN, KZOR

History
- First air date: 1965 (as KSCR)
- Former call signs: KSCR (1965–1979); KPER (1979–2014); KYKK (2014–2017)
- Call sign meaning: Lea County

Technical information
- Licensing authority: FCC
- Facility ID: 2870
- Class: C3
- ERP: 25,000 watts
- HAAT: 100 meters (330 ft)
- Transmitter coordinates: 32°43′27″N 103°9′4″W

Links
- Public license information: Public file; LMS
- Webcast: Listen Live
- Website: hobbsamerica.com Facebook page

KLEA (95.7 FM) is a radio station broadcasting a classic hits format. Licensed to Hobbs, New Mexico, United States, the station is currently owned by Noalmark Broadcasting Corporation.

== Engineering ==
Chief Engineer is Kenneth S. Fine, CPBE
