= List of radio stations in Arkansas =

The following is a list of FCC-licensed radio stations in the U.S. state of Arkansas, which can be sorted by their call signs, frequencies, cities of license, licensees, and programming formats. NOAA Weather Radio stations are not listed.

== List of radio stations ==
| Call sign | Frequency | City of License | Licensee | Format |
|---|---|---|---|---|
| KAAB | 1130 AM | Batesville | WRD Entertainment, Inc. | Country |
| KAAY | 1090 AM | Little Rock | Radio License Holding CBC, LLC | Brokered/Christian |
| KABF | 88.3 FM | Little Rock | Arkansas Broadcasting Foundation Inc. | Community |
| KABZ | 103.7 FM | Little Rock | Signal Media of Arkansas, Inc. | Talk/Personality |
| KAFN | 690 AM | Benton | High Plains Radio Network, LLC | Classic rock |
| KAGE | 1580 AM | Van Buren | G2 Media Group LLC | Red Dirt country |
| KAGH | 800 AM | Crossett | Ashley County Broadcasters, Inc. | Oldies |
| KAGH-FM | 104.9 FM | Crossett | Ashley County Broadcasters, Inc. | Country |
| KAGL | 93.3 FM | El Dorado | Noalmark Broadcasting Corporation | Classic rock |
| KAKJ | 105.3 FM | Marianna | L.T. Simes II & Raymond Simes | Urban adult contemporary |
| KAKS | 99.5 FM | Goshen | Pearson Broadcasting of Goshen, Inc. | Sports (ESPN) |
| KAKV | 88.9 FM | El Dorado | Educational Media Foundation | Contemporary Christian (K-Love) |
| KALR | 91.5 FM | Hot Springs | Educational Media Foundation | Christian Worship Music (Air1) |
| KAMD-FM | 97.1 FM | Camden | Radio Works, Inc. | Sports (FSR) |
| KAMJ | 93.9 FM | Gosnell | Bobby D. Caldwell Revocable Trust | Hip hop |
| KAMO-FM | 94.3 FM | Rogers | Cumulus Licensing LLC | Country |
| KAMS | 95.1 FM | Mammoth Spring | E-Communications, LLC | Country |
| KANX | 91.1 FM | Sheridan | American Family Association | Inspirational (AFR) |
| KAOG | 90.5 FM | Jonesboro | American Family Association | Inspirational (AFR) |
| KAOW | 88.9 FM | Fort Smith | Community Broadcasting, Inc. | Christian Talk (Bott Radio Network) |
| KARH | 104.3 FM | Fouke | Educational Media Foundation | Christian Worship Music (Air1) |
| KARN-FM | 102.9 FM | Sheridan | Radio License Holding CBC, LLC | News/Talk |
| KARV | 610 AM | Russellville | EAB of Russellville, LLC | News/Talk |
| KARV-FM | 101.3 FM | Ola | EAB of Russellville, LLC | News/Talk |
| KASR | 99.3 FM | Atkins | EAB of Morrilton, LLC | Classic rock |
| KASU | 91.9 FM | Jonesboro | Arkansas State University | Public radio/News/Classical/Jazz |
| KASZ | 1190 AM | White Hall | Broadcast Industry Group, LLC | Classic rock |
| KAWW | 1370 AM | Heber Springs | Crain Media Group, LLC | News/Sports/Talk |
| KAWX | 89.3 FM | Mena | Community Broadcasting, Inc. | Christian Talk (Bott Radio Network) |
| KAYH | 89.3 FM | Fayetteville | Community Broadcasting, Inc. | Christian Talk (Bott Radio Network) |
| KBAP | 88.1 FM | Batesville | Tony V. Hammack Ministries | Contemporary Christian |
| KBBQ-FM | 102.7 FM | Van Buren | Cumulus Licensing LLC | Rhythmic contemporary |
| KBCM | 88.3 FM | Blytheville | American Family Association | Inspirational (AFR) |
| KBCN-FM | 104.3 FM | Marshall | Pearson Broadcasting of Marshall, Inc. | Sports (ESPN) |
| KBDO | 91.7 FM | Des Arc | American Family Association | Religious Talk (AFR) |
| KBEU | 92.7 FM | Bearden | Radio Works, Inc. | News/Talk |
| KBFC | 93.5 FM | Forrest City | Forrest City Broadcasting Co., Inc. | Country |
| KBGB | 105.7 FM | Magness | Crain Media Group, LLC | Country |
| KBHN | 89.7 FM | Booneville | Vision Ministries, Inc. | Contemporary Christian |
| KBHQ-LP | 100.7 FM | Harrison | North Arkansas Performing Artists Coalition | Classic rock |
| KBHS | 1420 AM | Hot Springs | La Zeta 957 Inc. | News/Talk |
| KBJT | 1590 AM | Fordyce | KBJT, Inc. | News/Talk |
| KBMJ | 89.5 FM | Heber Springs | American Family Association | Inspirational (AFR) |
| KBNV | 90.1 FM | Fayetteville | American Family Association | Religious Talk (AFR) |
| KBOA-FM | 105.5 FM | Piggott | Pollack Broadcasting Co. | Hot adult contemporary |
| KBPU | 88.7 FM | De Queen | Board of Trustees of the University of Arkansas | Contemporary Inspirational |
| KBPW | 88.1 FM | Hampton | American Family Association | Religious Talk (AFR) |
| KBRI | 104.1 FM | Clarendon | East Arkansas Broadcasters, Inc. | |
| KBSA | 90.9 FM | El Dorado | Bd Supervisors, | Public radio |
| KBTA | 1340 AM | Batesville | WRD Entertainment, Inc. | Sports (ISN) |
| KBTA-FM | 99.5 FM | Batesville | WRD Entertainment, Inc. | Contemporary hit radio |
| KBTM | 1230 AM | Jonesboro | East Arkansas Broadcasters of Jonesboro, LLC | News/Talk |
| KBVA | 106.5 FM | Bella Vista | Rox Radio Group, LLC | Classic hits |
| KBYB | 101.7 FM | Hope | BTC USA Holdings Management Inc. | Country |
| KBZU | 106.7 FM | Benton | Signal Media of Arkansas, Inc. | Sports (ESPN) |
| KCAB | 980 AM | Dardanelle | EAB of Russellville, LLC | Adult hits |
| KCAC | 89.5 FM | Camden | Southern Arkansas University Tech | Alternative rock |
| KCAT | 1340 AM | Pine Bluff | Broadcast Industry Group, LLC | Urban oldies |
| KCAV | 90.3 FM | Marshall | Christian Broadcasting Group of Mountain Home | Christian |
| KCCB | 1260 AM | Corning | Shields-Adkins Broadcasting, Inc. | Jazz |
| KCCJ-LP | 102.3 FM | Batesville | Jubilee Family Church, Inc. | Contemporary Christian |
| KCGS-FM | 88.1 FM | Marshall | Ichthus Family Hope, Inc. | |
| KCHR-FM | 107.3 FM | Cotton Plant | Caldwell Media LLC | Adult hits |
| KCJC | 102.3 FM | Dardanelle | EAB of Russellville, LLC | Country |
| KCLT | 104.9 FM | West Helena | West Helena Broadcasters Inc. | Urban adult contemporary |
| KCMC-FM | 94.3 FM | Viola | High Plains Radio Network, LLC | Classic rock |
| KCMH | 91.5 FM | Mountain Home | Christian Broadcasting Group of Mountain Home, Inc. | Christian radio |
| KCNY | 107.1 FM | Greenbrier | Crain Media Group, LLC | Country |
| KCON | 92.7 FM | Vilonia | EAB of Morrilton, LLC | Adult hits |
| KCTT-FM | 101.7 FM | Yellville | Mountain Lakes Broadcasting Corp. | Classic hits |
| KCVC | 90.1 FM | Cherry Valley | Community Broadcasting, Inc. | Christian |
| KCWD | 96.1 FM | Harrison | Harrison Radio Stations, Inc. | Classic hits |
| KCXY | 95.3 FM | East Camden | Radio Works, Inc. | Mainstream country |
| KDEL-FM | 100.9 FM | Arkadelphia | High Plains Radio Network, LLC | Classic rock |
| KDEW-FM | 97.3 FM | De Witt | Arkansas County Broadcasters, Inc. | Country |
| KDIS-FM | 99.5 FM | Little Rock | Salem Communications Holding Corporation | Christian radio |
| KDIV-LP | 98.7 FM | Fayetteville | Voice of Diversity | Urban |
| KDJE | 100.3 FM | Jacksonville | iHM Licenses, LLC | Active rock |
| KDMS | 1290 AM | El Dorado | Noalmark Broadcasting Corporation | Gospel |
| KDNY-LP | 94.7 FM | Hope | Iglesia Fuente de Agua Viva | Spanish Religious |
| KDPX | 101.3 FM | Pine Bluff | Bluff City Radio. LLC | Oldies |
| KDQN | 1390 AM | De Queen | Bunyard Broadcasting, Inc. | Spanish |
| KDQN-FM | 92.1 FM | De Queen | Bunyard Broadcasting, Inc. | Country |
| KDRS | 1490 AM | Paragould | Mor Media, Inc. | Mainstream rock |
| KDRS-FM | 107.1 FM | Paragould | Mor Media, Inc. | Adult hits |
| KDUA-LP | 96.5 FM | Rogers | St. Anthony Of Padua Educational Association | Catholic |
| KDXE | 101.1 FM | Cammack Village | Salem Communications Holding Corporation | Conservative Talk |
| KDXY | 104.9 FM | Lake City | Saga Communications of Arkansas, LLC | Country |
| KDYN-FM | 92.7 FM | Coal Hill | Ozark Communications, Inc. | Country |
| KEAZ | 100.7 FM | Kensett | Crain Media Group, LLC | Top 40 (CHR) |
| KEGI | 100.5 FM | Trumann | Saga Communications of Arkansas, LLC | Classic rock |
| KEJA | 91.7 FM | Cale | American Family Association | Inspirational (AFR) |
| KELD | 1400 AM | El Dorado | Noalmark Broadcasting Corporation | Talk |
| KELD-FM | 106.5 FM | Hampton | Noalmark Broadcasting Corporation | Top 40 (CHR) |
| KELF-LP | 104.3 FM | Fayetteville | Friends of the Arkansas and Missouri railroad | Variety (40s to Today) |
| KENA-FM | 104.1 FM | Hatfield | Ouachita Broadcasting, Inc. | Country |
| KENJ-LP | 104.5 FM | Lowell | Iglesia Ciudad de Refugio | Spanish Religious |
| KERL | 103.9 FM | Earle | Bobby D. Caldwell Revocable Trust | Country |
| KERX | 95.3 FM | Paris | Hit the line Arkansas. | Sports |
| KESA | 100.9 FM | Eureka Springs | Carroll County Broadcasting, Inc. | Classic rock |
| KEZA | 107.9 FM | Fayetteville | iHM Licenses, LLC | Adult contemporary |
| KFAY | 1030 AM | Farmington | Cumulus Licensing LLC | News/Talk |
| KFCM | 98.3 FM | Cherokee Village | KFCM, Inc. | Oldies |
| KFFA | 1360 AM | Helena | Spearman Land and Development | Country |
| KFFA-FM | 103.1 FM | Helena | Spearman Land and Development | Adult contemporary |
| KFFB | 106.1 FM | Fairfield Bay | Freedom Broadcasting, Inc. | News-talk-adult standards |
| KFFK | 1390 AM | Decatur | Rox Radio Group, LLC | Red Dirt country |
| KFIN | 107.9 FM | Jonesboro | East Arkansas Broadcasters of Jonesboro, LLC | Country |
| KFLI | 104.7 FM | Des Arc | George S. Flinn Jr. | Classic hits |
| KFLO-LP | 102.9 FM | Jonesboro | American Heritage Media, Inc. | Classic hits |
| KFPW | 1230 AM | Fort Smith | Pharis Broadcasting, Inc. | Talk |
| KFPW-FM | 94.5 FM | Barling | Pharis Broadcasting, Inc. | Active rock |
| KFSA | 950 AM | Fort Smith | Star 92, Co. | Country |
| KFSW | 1650 AM | Fort Smith | G2 Media Group LLC | Southern gospel |
| KGDA-LP | 102.3 FM | Fort Smith | Iglesia Gozo de mi Alma | Spanish religious |
| KGFL | 1110 AM | Clinton | King-Sullivan Radio | Classic hits |
| KGMR | 1360 AM | Clarksville | Radio La Raza, LLC | Regional Mexican |
| KGPQ | 99.9 FM | Monticello | Pines Broadcasting, Inc. | Adult contemporary |
| KGSF | 88.7 FM | Huntsville | CSN International | Religious (CSN International) |
| KHBM-FM | 93.7 FM | Monticello | Pines Broadcasting, Inc. | Classic rock |
| KHBZ | 102.9 FM | Harrison | Ozark Mountain Media Group, LLC | Country |
| KHDX | 93.1 FM | Conway | Hendrix College | Variety |
| KHEL-LP | 97.3 FM | Rogers | New Covenant Church In America | Rock/Talk/News |
| KHGG-FM | 103.5 FM | Mansfield | Pharis Broadcasting, Inc. | Silent |
| KHGZ | 670 AM | Glenwood | E Radio Network, LLC | Sports (FSR) |
| KHHS | 104.5 FM | Pearcy | Houston Christian Broadcasters, Inc. | Christian radio |
| KHKN | 94.9 FM | Maumelle | iHM Licenses, LLC | Top 40 (CHR) |
| KHLR | 91.9 FM | Harrison | Educational Media Foundation | Contemporary Christian (K-Love) |
| KHLS | 96.3 FM | Blytheville | Bobby D. Caldwell Revocable Trust | Country |
| KHMB | 99.5 FM | Hamburg | R&M Broadcasting | Adult contemporary |
| KHOA-LP | 107.9 FM | Hope | Hope for Hempstead County, Inc. | Southern Gospel |
| KHOM | 100.9 FM | Salem | E-Communications, LLC | Classic hits |
| KHOX-LP | 106.7 FM | Walnut Ridge | Waxman Educational Corp. | Jazz |
| KHOZ | 900 AM | Harrison | Ozark Mountain Media Group, LLC | Classic country |
| KHPA | 104.9 FM | Hope | Newport Broadcasting Company | Defunct |
| KHPQ | 92.1 FM | Clinton | King-Sullivan Radio | Country |
| KHSA-LP | 107.3 FM | Hot Springs | Maranatha Broadcasting Ministry, Inc. | Christian (Radio 74 Internationale) |
| KHTE-FM | 96.5 FM | England | Bradford Media Group, LLC | Mainstream urban |
| KIHW-LP | 104.1 FM | West Helena | Hope Radio | Christian (Radio 74 Internationale) |
| KILB-LP | 99.1 FM | Paron | Amazing Grace Church | Southern Gospel |
| KILX | 102.1 FM | De Queen | Bunyard Broadcasting, Inc. | Country |
| KINC-LP | 98.1 FM | Little Rock | Multicultural Expo Center | Variety |
| KIPR | 92.3 FM | Pine Bluff | Radio License Holding CBC, LLC | Urban |
| KISR | 93.7 FM | Fort Smith | Stereo 93 Inc. | Top 40 (CHR) |
| KIXB | 103.3 FM | El Dorado | Noalmark Broadcasting Corporation | Country |
| KIYS | 101.7 FM | Walnut Ridge | East Arkansas Broadcasters, Inc. | Top 40 (CHR) |
| KJAT-LP | 97.3 FM | Sulphur Springs | Stateline Christian Radio Group, Inc. | Christian (Radio 74 Internationale) |
| KJBN | 1050 AM | Little Rock | Joshua Ministries & Community Development Corp. | Religious |
| KJBR | 93.7 FM | Marked Tree | Educational Media Foundation | Christian Contemporary (Air1) |
| KJBS-LP | 101.1 FM | Mena | Mena Public School Board | Variety |
| KJBX | 106.3 FM | Trumann | Saga Communications of Arkansas, LLC | Adult contemporary |
| KJDS | 101.9 FM | Mountain Pine | Houston Christian Broadcasters, Inc. | Christian radio |
| KJIW-FM | 94.5 FM | Helena | Elijah Mondy Jr. | Gospel |
| KJMT | 97.1 FM | Calico Rock | High Plains Radio Network, LLC | Sports (FSR) |
| KJSA | 89.7 FM | Jonesboro | Radio 74 Internationale | Religious (Radio 74 Internationale) |
| KJSB | 88.3 FM | Jonesboro | American Family Association | Religious Talk (AFR) |
| KJSM-FM | 97.7 FM | Augusta | Family Worship Center Church, Inc. | Religious |
| KJSS-LP | 104.3 FM | North Little Rock | Pulaski County Learning Center, Inc. | Variety |
| KKEG | 98.3 FM | Bentonville | Cumulus Licensing LLC | Classic hits rock |
| KKIK | 106.5 FM | Horseshoe Bend | WRD Entertainment, Inc. | Country |
| KKIX | 103.9 FM | Fayetteville | iHM Licenses, LLC | Country |
| KKJJ | 88.5 FM | Diamond City | The Power Foundation | Christian |
| KKLT | 89.3 FM | Texarkana | Educational Media Foundation | Contemporary Christian (K-Love) |
| KKPT | 94.1 FM | Little Rock | Signal Media of Arkansas, Inc. | Classic rock |
| KKSP | 93.3 FM | Bryant | Salem Communications Holding Corporation | Contemporary Christian |
| KKTZ | 107.5 FM | Mountain Home | Mac Partners | Hot AC |
| KLAB | 101.1 FM | Siloam Springs | John Brown University | Christian adult contemporary |
| KLAL | 107.7 FM | Wrightsville | Radio License Holding CBC, LLC | Top 40 (CHR) |
| KLAZ | 105.9 FM | Hot Springs | US Stations, LLC | Top 40 (CHR) |
| KLBL | 101.5 FM | Malvern | US Stations, LLC | Classic hits |
| KLBQ | 101.5 FM | Junction City | Noalmark Broadcasting Corporation | Classic country |
| KLEK-LP | 102.5 FM | Jonesboro | The Voice of Arkansas Minority Advocacy Council | R&B/Urban Gospel |
| KLFH | 90.7 FM | Fort Smith | Educational Media Foundation | Contemporary Christian (K-Love) |
| KLFJ | 105.3 FM | Hoxie | Educational Media Foundation | Contemporary Christian (K-Love) |
| KLFS | 90.3 FM | Van Buren | Educational Media Foundation | Contemporary Christian (K-Love) |
| KLJK | 94.7 FM | Weiner | Educational Media Foundation | Contemporary Christian (K-Love) |
| KLLN | 90.9 FM | Newark | Cedar Ridge School District | High school |
| KLMK | 90.7 FM | Marvell | Educational Media Foundation | Contemporary Christian (K-Love) |
| KLRE-FM | 90.5 FM | Little Rock | Board of Trustees of the University of Arkansas | Classical |
| KLRG | 880 AM | Sheridan | Broadcast Industry Group, LLC | Classic rock |
| KLRM | 90.7 FM | Melbourne | Educational Media Foundation | Contemporary Christian (K-Love) |
| KLRO | 90.1 FM | Hot Springs | Educational Media Foundation | Contemporary Christian (K-Love) |
| KLTK | 1140 AM | Centerton | La Zeta 957 Inc | News/Talk |
| KLUY | 88.7 FM | Searcy | Educational Media Foundation | Contemporary Christian (K-Love) |
| KLXQ | 96.7 FM | Hot Springs | US Stations, LLC | Classic rock |
| KLYR | 1540 AM | Ozark | Ozark Communications, Inc. | Country |
| KMAG | 99.1 FM | Fort Smith | iHM Licenses, LLC | Country |
| KMCK-FM | 105.7 FM | Prairie Grove | Cumulus Licensing LLC | Top 40 (CHR) |
| KMGC | 104.5 FM | Camden | Radio Works, Inc. | Urban contemporary |
| KMJI | 93.3 FM | Ashdown | Townsquare License, LLC | Urban contemporary |
| KMJX | 105.1 FM | Conway | iHM Licenses, LLC | Classic country |
| KMLK | 98.7 FM | El Dorado | Noalmark Broadcasting Corporation | Urban contemporary |
| KMRW-LP | 98.9 FM | Springdale | NWA Local Artist Media | Variety (40s to Today) |
| KMRX | 96.1 FM | El Dorado | Noalmark Broadcasting Corporation | Classic hits |
| KMTB | 99.5 FM | Murfreesboro | Arklatex Radio, Inc. | Country |
| KMTC | 91.1 FM | Russellville | Russellville Educ B/C Foundation | Contemporary Christian |
| KMTL | 760 AM | Sherwood | Radio La Raza, LLC | Religious |
| KMXF | 101.9 FM | Lowell | iHM Licenses, LLC | Top 40 (CHR) |
| KNAS | 105.5 FM | Nashville | Arklatex Radio, Inc. | Classic country |
| KNBY | 1280 AM | Newport | Bobby D. Caldwell Revocable Trust | Oldies |
| KNEA | 970 AM | Jonesboro | East Arkansas Broadcasters of Jonesboro, LLC | Sports (FSR) |
| KNFR | 90.9 FM | Gravel Ridge | Fellowship Christian Church | Christian |
| KNHD | 1450 AM | Camden | Family Worship Center Church, Inc. | Christian |
| KNLL | 90.5 FM | Nashville | American Family Association | Religious Talk (AFR) |
| KNSH | 100.7 FM | Fort Smith | Cumulus Licensing LLC | Country |
| KNWA | 1600 AM | Bellefonte | Harrison Radio Stations, Inc. | Classic country |
| KOAR | 101.5 FM | Beebe | Educational Media Foundation | Christian Worship Music (Air1) |
| KOBV-LP | 103.3 FM | Bentonville | Bentonville Information | Variety |
| KOKR | 96.7 FM | Newport | Bobby D. Caldwell Revocable Trust | Country |
| KOKY | 102.1 FM | Sherwood | The Last Bastion Station Trust, LLC, as Trustee | Urban adult contemporary |
| KOLL | 106.3 FM | Lonoke | La Zeta 95.7 Inc. | Regional Mexican |
| KOMT | 93.5 FM | Lakeview | John M. Dowdy | Talk |
| KOOU | 104.7 FM | Hardy | Koou, Incorporated | Country |
| KOSE | 860 AM | Wilson | Bobby D. Caldwell Revocable Trust | Gospel/Country |
| KOSE-FM | 107.3 FM | Osceola | Bobby D. Caldwell Revocable Trust | Oldies |
| KOTN | 102.5 FM | Gould | Arkansas County Broadcasters, Inc. | Classic country |
| KOYH | 95.5 FM | Elaine | Smile FM | Hot AC/Adult album alternative |
| KOYR | 88.5 FM | Yorktown | Smile FM | Contemporary Christian (Smile FM) |
| KOZR-LP | 102.9 FM | Gentry | Gentry Communications Network, Inc | Religious Teaching |
| KPBA | 99.3 FM | Pine Bluff | One Media, Inc. | Urban contemporary |
| KPBI | 1250 AM | Fayetteville | KTV Media, LLC | Regional Mexican |
| KPFM | 105.5 FM | Mountain Home | Mountain Home Radio Station, Inc. | Country |
| KPGC-LP | 95.1 FM | Norman | His Will, Inc. | Christian |
| KPGG | 103.9 FM | Ashdown | American Media Investments Inc. | Classic country |
| KPOC | 1420 AM | Pocahontas | Combined Media Group, Inc. | Contemporary Christian |
| KPOC-FM | 104.1 FM | Pocahontas | Combined Media Group, Inc. | Adult contemporary |
| KPSQ-LP | 97.3 FM | Fayetteville | OMNI Center for Peace, Justice and Ecology | Variety |
| KPWA | 93.5 FM | Bismarck | Houston Christian Broadcasters, Inc. | Christian radio |
| KPZK-FM | 102.5 FM | Cabot | The Last Bastion Station Trust, LLC, as Trustee | Gospel |
| KQBK | 104.7 FM | Waldron | Pharis Broadcasting, Inc. | Oldies |
| KQEW | 102.3 FM | Fordyce | Dallas Properties, Inc. | News/Talk |
| KQIS | 1340 AM | Bethel Heights | Perry Broadcasting of Arkansas, Inc. | Urban contemporary |
| KQIX-LP | 96.5 FM | Perryville | St. Francis Chapel | Variety |
| KQLO-LP | 97.5 FM | Clarksville | Johnson Country Community Radio Inc | Variety |
| KQOR | 102.1 FM | Mena | Ouachita Broadcasting, Inc. | Classic country |
| KQPN | 730 AM | West Memphis | KQPN, Inc. | Conservative talk |
| KQSM-FM | 92.1 FM | Fayetteville | Cumulus Licensing LLC | Sports (ISN) |
| KQUS-FM | 97.5 FM | Hot Springs | Us Stations, LLC | Country |
| KREB | 1190 AM | Gentry | Rox Radio Group, LLC | Red Dirt Country |
| KRLW | 1320 AM | Walnut Ridge | Combined Media Group, Inc. | Oldies |
| KRMW | 94.9 FM | Cedarville | Cumulus Licensing LLC | Adult album alternative |
| KRQA | 88.1 FM | Bentonville | Educational Media Foundation | Christian Worship Music (Air1) |
| KRZP | 92.7 FM | Gassville | High Plains Radio Network, LLC | News/Talk |
| KRZS | 99.1 FM | Pangburn | Crain Media Group, LLC | Classic rock |
| KSEC | 95.7 FM | Bentonville | La Zeta 95.7 Inc. | Mexican Regional |
| KSSN | 95.7 FM | Little Rock | iHM Licenses, LLC | Country |
| KSSQ-LP | 102.3 FM | Siloam Springs | Siloam Springs Adventist Educational Radio | Christian (Radio 74 Internationale) |
| KSSW | 96.9 FM | Nashville | Family Worship Center Church, Inc. | Christian |
| KSUG | 101.9 FM | Heber Springs | Red River Radio, Inc. | Classic hits |
| KTCS | 1410 AM | Fort Smith | Big Chief Broadcasting Co. | Gospel |
| KTCS-FM | 99.9 FM | Fort Smith | Big Chief Broadcasting Company | Country |
| KTFS-FM | 107.1 FM | Texarkana | BTC USA Holdings Management Inc. | Talk |
| KTHS | 1480 AM | Green Forest | Carroll County Broadcasting, Inc. | Regional Mexican |
| KTHS-FM | 107.1 FM | Berryville | Carroll County Broadcasting, Inc. | Country |
| KTLO | 1240 AM | Mountain Home | Mountain Lakes Broadcasting Corp. | Country |
| KTLO-FM | 97.9 FM | Mountain Home | Mountain Lakes Broadcasting Corp. | Adult standards |
| KTOY | 104.7 FM | Texarkana | BTC USA Holdings Management Inc. | Urban adult contemporary |
| KTPB | 98.1 FM | Altheimer | Bluff City Radio, LLC | Classic country |
| KTPG | 99.3 FM | Paragould | George S. Flinn Jr. | Hot adult contemporary |
| KTRN | 104.5 FM | White Hall | Bluff City Radio, LLC | Adult contemporary |
| KTRQ | 102.3 FM | Colt | East Arkansas Broadcasters, Inc. | Oldies |
| KTTG | 96.3 FM | Mena | Pearson Broadcasting of Mena, Inc. | Sports (ESPN) |
| KTUV | 1440 AM | Little Rock | Crain Media Group, LLC | Spanish variety |
| KTYC | 88.5 FM | Nashville | Board of Trustees of the University of Arkansas | Classic hits |
| KUAF | 91.3 FM | Fayetteville | Board of Trustees of the University of Arkansas | Classical music/News talk |
| KUAP | 89.7 FM | Pine Bluff | Board of Trustees of the University of Arkansas | Smooth jazz |
| KUAR | 89.1 FM | Little Rock | Board of Trustees of the University of Arkansas | Public radio/News/Hot talk/Jazz |
| KUCA | 91.3 FM | Conway | University of Central Arkansas | Variety |
| KUDO-LP | 102.1 FM | Harrison | Churches of Christ Community Radio | Religious Teaching |
| KUHS-LP | 102.5 FM | Hot Springs | Low Key Arts Incorporated | Variety |
| KUOA | 1290 AM | Siloam Springs | Maxx Media Radio, LLC | Regional Mexican |
| KUOZ-LP | 100.5 FM | Clarksville | University Of The Ozarks | College radio |
| KURB | 98.5 FM | Little Rock | Radio License Holding CBC, LLC | Adult contemporary |
| KURM | 790 AM | Rogers | Kerm, Inc. | News/Talk |
| KURM-FM | 100.3 FM | Gravette | Kerm, Inc. | News/Talk |
| KUUZ | 95.9 FM | Lake Village | Family Worship Center Church, Inc. | Religious |
| KVDW | 1530 AM | England | Habibi's Broadcasting, Inc. | Urban Religious |
| KVHU | 95.3 FM | Judsonia | George S. Flinn Jr. | Variety |
| KVLO | 101.7 FM | Humnoke | Arkansas County Broadcasters, Inc. | Adult hits |
| KVMA | 630 AM | Magnolia | Noalmark Broadcasting Corporation | Sports (FSR) |
| KVMN | 89.9 FM | Cave City | Cave City Public Schools | High School Radio/Top 40 (CHR)/Modern AC |
| KVMZ | 99.1 FM | Waldo | Noalmark Broadcasting Corporation | Top 40 (CHR) |
| KVOM | 800 AM | Morrilton | EAB of Morrilton, LLC | Oldies |
| KVOM-FM | 101.7 FM | Morrilton | EAB of Morrilton, LLC | Country |
| KVRC | 1240 AM | Arkadelphia | High Plains Radio Network, LLC | Classic rock |
| KVRE | 92.9 FM | Hot Springs Village | Caddo Broadcasting Company | Adult standards |
| KWAK | 1240 AM | Stuttgart | Arkansas County Broadcasters, Inc. | Oldies |
| KWAK-FM | 105.5 FM | Stuttgart | Arkansas County Broadcasters, Inc. | Classic country |
| KWCK-FM | 99.9 FM | Searcy | Crain Media Group, LLC | Country |
| KWCP-LP | 98.9 FM | Little Rock | John Barrow Neighborhood Association | R&B |
| KWCV | 88.9 FM | Walnut Ridge | Community Broadcasting, Inc. | Christian Talk (Bott Radio Network) |
| KWEM-LP | 93.3 FM | West Memphis | Mid-South Community College | Oldies/Variety |
| KWHA | 89.9 FM | West Helena | Radio 74 Internationale | Christian (Radio 74 Internationale) |
| KWHF | 95.9 FM | Harrisburg | East Arkansas Broadcasters of Jonesboro, LLC | Classic country |
| KWHN | 1320 AM | Fort Smith | iHM Licenses, LLC | News/Talk |
| KWKK | 100.9 FM | Russellville | EAB of Russellville, LLC | Adult contemporary |
| KWLR | 96.9 FM | Bigelow | Educational Media Foundation | Contemporary Christian (K-Love) |
| KWLT | 102.7 FM | North Crossett | Southark Broadcasters, Inc. | Classic rock |
| KWMV | 88.5 FM | Mountain View | Community Educational Radio | |
| KWNW | 101.9 FM | Crawfordsville | iHM Licenses, LLC | Classic rock |
| KWOZ | 103.3 FM | Mountain View | WRD Entertainment, Inc. | Country |
| KWPS-FM | 99.7 FM | Caddo Valley | High Plains Radio Network, LLC | Classic rock |
| KWQX | 91.9 FM | Perryville | Perry County Educational Media, Inc. | |
| KWRF | 860 AM | Warren | Pines Broadcasting, Inc. | |
| KWRF-FM | 105.5 FM | Warren | Pines Broadcasting, Inc. | |
| KWXT | 1490 AM | Dardanelle | Caldwell Media LLC | Southern Gospel |
| KWYN | 1400 AM | Wynne | East Arkansas Broadcasters, Inc. | Classic country |
| KWYN-FM | 92.5 FM | Wynne | East Arkansas Broadcasters, Inc. | Country |
| KXFE | 106.9 FM | Dumas | Arkansas County Broadcasters, Inc. | Country |
| KXHT | 107.1 FM | Marion | Flinn Broadcasting Corporation | Rhythmic contemporary |
| KXIO | 106.9 FM | Clarksville | EAB of Clarksville, LLC | Country |
| KXJK | 950 AM | Forrest City | Forrest City Broadcasting Co., Inc. | Classic hits |
| KXNA | 104.9 FM | Springdale | Rox Radio Group, LLC | Alternative |
| KXRD | 96.7 FM | Fayetteville | Rox Radio Group, LLC | Country |
| KXRJ | 91.9 FM | Russellville | Arkansas Tech University | College |
| KXSA-FM | 103.1 FM | Dermott | Pines Broadcasting, Inc. | |
| KXUA | 88.3 FM | Fayetteville | Board of Trustees of the University of Arkansas | College |
| KXVB | 101.5 FM | Greenland | Rox Radio Group, LLC | Conservative talk |
| KYEL | 105.5 FM | Danville | EAB of Russellville, LLC | Classic rock |
| KYFE-LP | 92.9 FM | Bentonville | Iglesia Ciudad de Refugio y Restauracion Inc | Spanish Religious |
| KYGL | 106.3 FM | Texarkana | Townsquare License, LLC | Classic rock |
| KYNG | 1590 AM | Springdale | Cumulus Licensing LLC | Sports (ISN) |
| KYXK | 106.9 FM | Gurdon | High Plains Radio Network, LLC | Classic rock |
| KZEQ-LP | 104.9 FM | Harrison | Bellefonte Church of Christ | Religious Teaching |
| KZHE | 100.5 FM | Stamps | A-1 Communications, Inc. | Classic country |
| KZKZ-FM | 106.3 FM | Greenwood | Family Communications, Inc. | Contemporary Christian |
| KZLE | 93.1 FM | Batesville | WRD Entertainment, Inc. | Classic rock |
| KZLI-LP | 107.3 FM | Little Rock | Little Rock Hispanic Education Family Fundation | |
| KZNG | 1340 AM | Hot Springs | Us Stations, LLC | News/Talk |
| KZTS | 1380 AM | North Little Rock | Salem Communications Holding Corporation | Gospel |
| KZYP | 1310 AM | Malvern | High Plains Radio Network, LLC | Classic rock |
| KZYQ | 101.5 FM | Eudora | Contemporary Communications LLC | Urban adult contemporary |
| KZZC-LP | 94.3 FM | Hope | April R. Love Scholarship | R&B |
| WGUE | 1180 AM | Turrell | Butron Media Corporation | Regional Mexican |

== Defunct ==
- KAAB - Hot Springs
- KAMD
- KAPZ
- KARH - Forrest City
- KARN
- KAWX-LP
- KBHC
- KBKG
- KBRI
- KBRS
- KCCL
- KCGS
- KCLA
- KCON
- KDDA
- KDEW
- KENA
- KENB-LP
- KESP
- KFOG
- KGED
- KGKO
- KGPL
- KHAM
- KHBM
- KHBR-LP
- KHEE-LP
- KJQS
- KKIP
- KLCN
- KLRG - North Little Rock
- KMOA
- KOKY
- KOSY
- KOTN - Pine Bluff
- KPBA - Pine Bluff
- KPBQ-FM
- KPCA
- KPJN-LP
- KPWH-LP
- KRKD
- KRMN
- KSIP
- KSMD
- KSRB
- KSRK-LP
- KSSP
- KSWH-LP
- KSYP
- KTPA
- KTPV-LP
- KUEC
- KVSA
- KXAR
- KXKY
- KXXA
- KYDE
- KZHS
- KZOT
- KZTD - Cabot
- KZYP - Pine Bluff
- KZYQ - Lake Village
- WETI
- WOK

== See also ==
- Arkansas media
  - List of newspapers in Arkansas
  - List of television stations in Arkansas
  - Media of cities in Arkansas: Fayetteville, Fort Smith, Hot Springs, Little Rock, Rogers

== Bibliography ==
- Jack Alicoate, ed. (1939), "Arkansas", Radio Annual, New York: Radio Daily, OCLC 2459636 – via Internet Archive
- Chas. A. Alicoate, ed. (1957), "Amplitude Modulation Stations - AM: Arkansas", Radio Annual and Television Yearbook, New York: Radio Daily Corp., OCLC 10512206 – via Internet Archive
- "AM Stations in the U.S.: Arkansas", Radio Annual Television Year Book, New York: Radio Television Daily, 1963, OCLC 10512375 – via Internet Archive

== Images ==
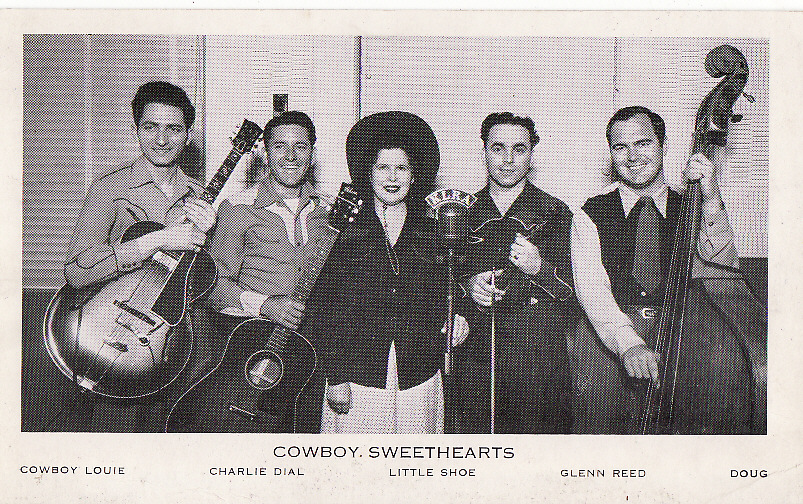
Cowboy Sweethearts at KLRA radio in Little Rock, circa 1940s

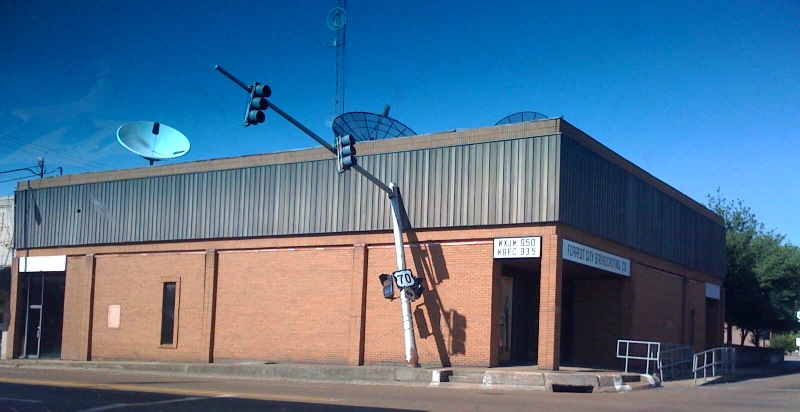
Forrest City Broadcasting, Ark., 2009

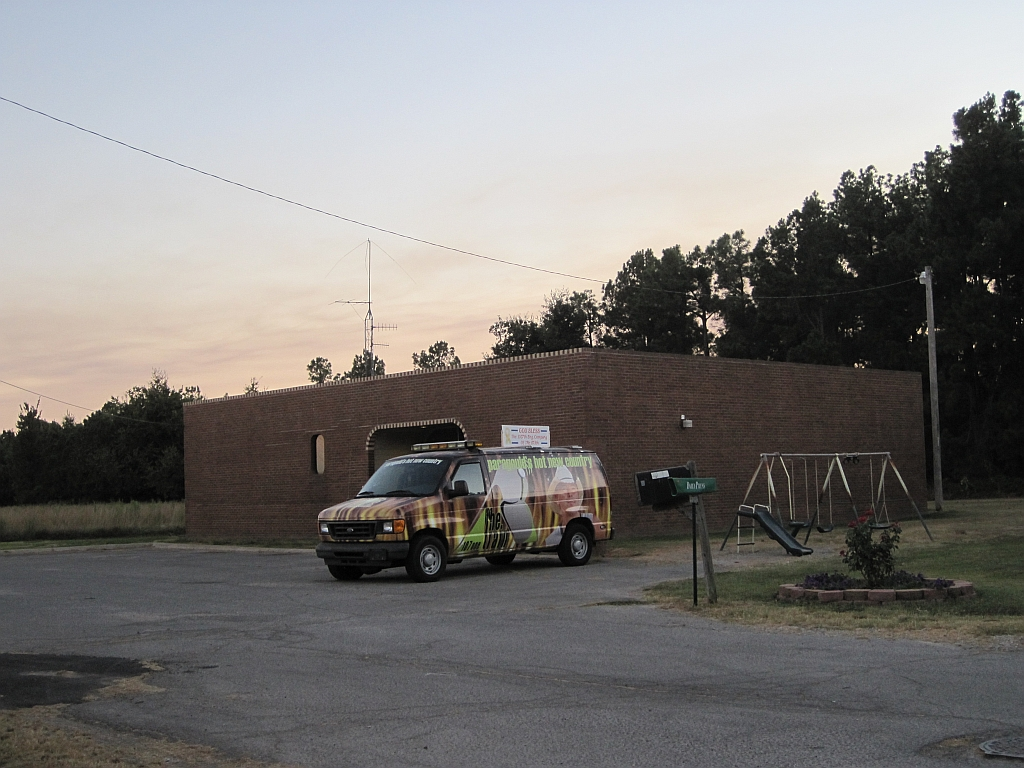
KDRS-FM radio, Paragould, Arkansas, 2010
