= Kena =

Kena or KENA may refer to:

== Places ==
- Kena (Vilnius), a village in Lithuania
- Kena, old spelling for Qena, a city in Egypt
- Kena Cone, a volcanic hill in Canada
- Kena (river), a river in Russia

== People with the name ==
- Jomde Kena (1965–2017), Indian politician
- Kena Mphonda, Malawian diplomat

== Other uses ==
- Kena, alternative spelling of Quena, a notched flute of the Andes
- Kena Upanishad, a Vedic Sanskrit text
- Kena: Bridge of Spirits, an action-adventure video game

== Radio stations ==
- KENA (AM), a radio station (1450 AM) licensed to serve Mena, Arkansas, United States
- KENA-FM, a radio station (104.1 FM) licensed to serve Hatfield, Arkansas
- KILX, a radio station (102.1 FM) licensed to serve Mena, Arkansas, which held the call sign KENA-FM from 1988 to 2014

== See also ==
- Kaena (disambiguation)
- Qena
