= KTHS =

KTHS may refer to:

- KTHS (AM), a radio station licensed to Berryville, Arkansas, United States
- KTHS-FM, a radio station licensed to Berryville, Arkansas, United States
- KAAY, a radio station originally licensed to Hot Springs, Arkansas, United States
- KTHV, a television station licensed to Little Rock, Arkansas, United States
- Kerang Technical High School, Kerang, Victoria, Australia
