= KDRS =

KDRS may refer to:

- KDRS (AM), a radio station (1490 AM) licensed to Paragould, Arkansas, United States
- KDRS-FM, a radio station (107.1 FM) licensed to Paragould, Arkansas, United States
