= WETI =

DWETI

Lake Village, Arkansas; United States
- Frequency: 103.5 MHz
- Branding: POWER 103.5 FM

Programming
- Format: Defunct (Hip-Hop/Funk/Blues)

Ownership
- Owner: Eternity Media Group; (Eternity Media Group, WETI, LLC)
- Sister stations: WGRM-FM, WGRM, WHJA, WERM, WABF, WNRR, WKXG, WLNO

Technical information
- Licensing authority: FCC
- Facility ID: 191531
- Class: C3
- ERP: 20 kilowatts
- HAAT: 72 meters (236 ft)
- Transmitter coordinates: 33°20′07″N 91°07′33″W

Links
- Public license information: Public file; LMS

WETI was an FM radio station licensed to Lake Village, Arkansas and broadcast on a frequency of 103.5 MHz. WETI was last owned by Eternity Media Group.

The format was known as POWER 103.5 FM and played a mix of Classic Hip-Hop Old-School Funk and Blues.

The Federal Communications Commission deleted WETI's license and call sign on June 3, 2021.
