= WGRM =

WGRM may refer to:

- WGRM (AM), a defunct radio station (1240 AM) licensed to Greenwood, Mississippi, United States
- WGRM-FM, a defunct radio station (93.9 FM) licensed to Greenwood, Mississippi, United States
