= KARV =

KARV may refer to:

- KARV (AM), a radio station (610 AM) licensed to Russellville, Arkansas, United States
- KARV-FM, a radio station (101.3 FM) licensed to Ola, Arkansas, United States
- Lakeland Airport (ICAO code KARV)
