= KDPX =

KDPX may refer to:

- KDPX (FM), a radio station (101.3 FM) licensed to serve Pine Bluff, Arkansas, United States
- KRET-CD, a low-power television station (channel 31, virtual 45) licensed to serve Palm Springs, California, United States, which held the call sign KDPX-LP from 1999 to 2008
