= KBTA =

KBTA may refer to:

- KBTA (AM), a radio station (1340 AM) licensed to Batesville, Arkansas, United States
- KBTA-FM, a radio station (99.5 FM) licensed to Batesville, Arkansas, United States
- KBTA, the ICAO code for Blair Municipal Airport, Nebraska, United States
