= KWYN =

KWYN may refer to:

- KWYN (AM), a radio station (1400 AM) licensed to Wynne, Arkansas, United States
- KWYN-FM, a radio station (92.5 FM) licensed to Wynne, Arkansas
