= KBHC =

KBHC may refer to:

- KBHC (FM), a radio station (101.1 FM) in Medicine Bow, Wyoming
- KBHC (Arkansas), a defunct radio station (1260 AM) in Nashville, Arkansas, that operated from 1959 to 2019
