= KDQN =

KDQN may refer to:

- KDQN (AM), a radio station (1390 AM) licensed to De Queen, Arkansas, United States
- KDQN-FM, a radio station (92.1 FM) licensed to De Queen, Arkansas, United States
