= KOTN =

KOTN may refer to:

- KOTN (FM), a radio station (102.5 FM) licensed to Gould, Arkansas, United States
- KOTN (Pine Bluff, Arkansas), a defunct radio station (1490 AM) formerly licensed to Pine Bluff, Arkansas
- The Elder Scrolls IV: Knights of the Nine, an official expansion pack for the role-playing video game The Elder Scrolls IV: Oblivion
- King of the Nerds, an American competition-reality television series
  - King of the Nerds (UK TV series), a UK version of the show
- The Kingdom of the Netherlands, a constitutional monarchy
