= WLNO =

WLNO may refer to:

- WLNO (FM), a radio station (104.1 FM) licensed to Waldorf, Maryland, United States
- WLNO (New Orleans), a radio station (1060 AM) formerly licensed to New Orleans, Louisiana, United States, which used the call sign from 1995 to 2025
