= KEAZ =

- Kensett, Arkansas; United States
- Broadcast area: Northern Suburbs of Little Rock
- Frequency: 100.7 MHz
- Branding: My Z100.7

Programming
- Format: Top 40 (CHR)

Ownership
- Owner: Crain Media Group, LLC
- Sister stations: KSMD, KRZS, KCNY, KHTE-FM, KAPZ, KAWW

History
- First air date: September 1, 1972 (as 96.7 KAWW-FM Heber Springs)
- Former call signs: KAWW-FM (1972–2008)
- Former frequencies: 96.7 MHz (1972–2002)

Technical information
- Licensing authority: FCC
- Facility ID: 48748
- Class: C2
- ERP: 50,000 watts
- HAAT: 129 meters (423 ft)
- Transmitter coordinates: 35°27′26″N 92°02′11″W

Links
- Public license information: Public file; LMS
- Webcast: Listen Live
- Website: myz100.com

KEAZ (100.7 MHz, "My Z100.7") is a radio station licensed to Kensett, Arkansas, serving the northern suburbs of Little Rock. The station is owned by Crain Media Group, LLC, and airs a Top 40 (CHR) radio format. It uses the slogan, "All The Hits."

The studios and offices are on North Spring Street in Searcy, Arkansas. The transmitter is off McIntosh Drive, near Route 16, also in Searcy.

== History ==
On September 1, 1972, the station first signed on as KAWW-FM at 96.7 MHz in Heber Springs, Arkansas. It was the FM counterpart to AM 1370 KAWW and the two stations simulcast their programming. KAWW-FM was powered at only 3,000 watts, limiting its coverage to Heber Springs and its adjacent communities.

In 1998, Equity Broadcasting bought KAWW-AM-FM. In the early 2000s, the Federal Communications Commission granted a request to move KAWW-FM to 100.7 MHz. That was coupled with an increase in its coverage area, boosting the power to 50,000 watts.

The station was assigned the call sign KEAZ by the Federal Communications Commission on December 17, 2008. Those call letters referred to the format at the time, soft adult contemporary, described as "Easy." The city of license was switched to Kensett, Arkansas.

In the mid-2010s, the format moved to contemporary hit radio (Top 40).
