= KBRI =

KBRI may refer to:

- KBRI (FM), a radio station (104.1 FM) licensed to serve Clarendon, Arkansas, United States
- KBRI (AM), a defunct radio station (1570 AM) formerly licensed to serve Brinkley, Arkansas
- Korea Brain Research Institute, a research institute in South Korea
