= KBRI (AM) =

Brinkley, Arkansas; United States
- Frequency: 1570 kHz
- Branding: Gospel 1570

Programming
- Format: Defunct (Gospel)

Ownership
- Owner: East Arkansas Broadcasters, Inc.
- Sister stations: KTRQ, KWYN (AM), KWYN-FM

History
- First air date: December 21, 1959
- Last air date: October 8, 2013
- Call sign meaning: BRInkley

Technical information
- Facility ID: 67692
- Class: D
- Power: 250 watts (day); 23 watts (night)
- Transmitter coordinates: 34°52′2″N 91°12′4″W

KBRI (1570 AM, "Gospel 1570") was a radio station licensed to serve Brinkley, Arkansas, United States. The station was owned by East Arkansas Broadcasters, Inc.

KBRI broadcast a Gospel music format.

== History ==
KBRI was licensed December 21, 1959, to Mason W. Clifton's Tri-County Broadcasting Company as a daytime-only radio station. In 1969, an FM counterpart, KBRI-FM (now KTRQ), was built and launched. In 1995, the Tri-County Broadcasting Company sold the station to East Arkansas Broadcasters.

Citing financial reasons, KBRI went silent on October 8, 2013, and did not return to the air. East Arkansas Broadcasters surrendered KBRI's license to the Federal Communications Commission (FCC) on February 3, 2015. The FCC cancelled the license the same day. A new station with the KBRI calls, at 104.1 FM from transmitter at Clarendon, Arkansas, was licensed by the FCC in April 2015.
