= KSMD =

KSMD may refer to:

- KSMD (AM), a radio station (1300 AM) licensed to serve Searcy, Arkansas, United States
- KRZS (FM), a radio station (99.1 FM) licensed to serve Pangburn, Arkansas
- Smith Field (Indiana) (ICAO code KSMD)
