= KRMN =

KRMN may refer to:

- KRMN (FM), a defunct radio station (89.3 FM) formerly licensed to serve Mena, Arkansas, United States
- KJBS-LP, a radio station (101.1 FM) licensed to serve Mena, Arkansas, which held the call sign KRMN-LP from 2002 to 2017
- the ICAO code for Stafford Regional Airport near Stafford, Virginia
- Karman Holdings (NYSE ticker symbol KRMN)
