= KAWX =

KAWX may refer to:

- KAWX (FM), a radio station (89.3 FM) licensed to serve Mena, Arkansas, United States
- KAWX-LP, a defunct low-power radio station (93.1 FM) formerly licensed to serve Mena
