= KRZS =

KRZS may refer to:

- KRZS (FM), a radio station (99.1 FM) licensed to serve Pangburn, Arkansas, United States
- KSMD (AM), a radio station (1300 AM) licensed to serve Searcy, Arkansas, which held the call sign KRZS from 2014 to 2015
- KLKV (FM), a radio station (99.9 FM) licensed to serve Hunt, Texas, United States, which held the call sign KRZS from 2008 to 2013
- KGNN, a radio station (97.5 FM) licensed to serve Dewey-Humboldt, Arizona, United States, which held the call sign KRZS from 2005 to 2006
