= KZYQ =

KZYQ may refer to:

- KZYQ (FM), a radio station (101.5 FM) licensed to serve Eudora, Arkansas, United States
- KZYQ (defunct), a defunct radio station (103.5 FM) formerly licensed to serve Lake Village, Arkansas
