= WLNO (New Orleans) =

Radio station in New Orleans (1924–2025)

- New Orleans, Louisiana; United States
- Broadcast area: New Orleans metropolitan area
- Frequency: 1060 kHz

Ownership
- Owner: Donald Pugh, Sr.; (Eternity Media Group WLNO, LLC)
- Sister stations: WGRM; WGRM-FM; WFRK; WABF; WNRR; WERM; WHJA

History
- First air date: January 6, 1924
- Last air date: c. October 18, 2021
- Former call signs: WABZ (1924–1933); WBBX (1933–1934); WBNO (1934–1939); WNOE (1939–1995)
- Call sign meaning: "We Love New Orleans"

Technical information
- Facility ID: 58393
- Class: B
- Power: 50,000 watts (day); 5,000 watts (night)
- Transmitter coordinates: 29°52′46.7″N 89°59′51.3″W

WLNO (1060 AM) was a commercial radio station licensed to New Orleans, Louisiana, United States. Last owned by Eternity Media Group WLNO, LLC, the station served the New Orleans metropolitan area and carried an urban gospel format. The WLNO transmitter site was located in Belle Chasse.

The station went on the air in 1924 as WABZ; it became WBBX in 1933, WBNO in 1934, and WNOE after James A. Noe purchased the station in 1939. It became the first Top 40 station in New Orleans in the 1950s, shifting to album rock in the early 1970s and country music in 1981. WNOE was sold to Communicom Company in 1995 and became Christian radio station WLNO. After the station suspended operations in 2014, Eternity Media Group bought WLNO in 2015 and revived it as an urban gospel station; by October 2021, it had left the air for good, though its license remained active into 2025.

== History ==
WLNO traced its roots back to January 6, 1924, when WABZ, a 50-watt AM station licensed to Coliseum Place Baptist Church in New Orleans first went on air. The station changed its frequency, and call letters several times, becoming WBBX in 1933 and WBNO in 1934, before the license was acquired by former Louisiana Governor James A. Noe, who renamed the station WNOE in 1939. WNOE was the market's first Top 40 outlet during the 1950s, 1960s and 1970s. When it began broadcasting around the clock on February 14, 1955, it stunted by playing the record "Shtiggy Boom" by The Nuggets nonstop for 58 hours and 45 minutes. Some of the most famous disc jockeys on the 1960s WNOE included Gary Owens, Greg Mason, C. C. Courtney and Frank Jolley (with his alter-ego - Count Down).

WNOE, which shifted to 1060 kHz in 1950 to operate at its daytime 50,000 watts of power, was a favorite at the Gulf Coast beaches in Mississippi, Alabama, and even as far east as Pensacola Beach, Florida. With its big daytime signal, WNOE was even sometimes receivable in areas near the Gulf of Mexico like Tampa. WNOE abandoned its Top 40 format gradually in the early 1970s and evolved into one of the few album rock stations on AM dial in the U.S. In a sense, rival WTIX had the market to itself during that time, though some FM stations flirted with formats musically close to Top 40. However, with the slogan Real Rock (a slam at WTIX, who without competition, had softened its top 40 sound considerably) WNOE returned to AOR leaning top 40 format in 1973, and competed vigorously with WTIX into the early 1980s. By 1977, WNOE was a pop leaning AOR station somewhat softer than its FM sister station.

On January 27, 1981, WNOE flipped to an adult contemporary-leaning country music format, using crossover artists such as Kenny Rogers, Anne Murray, John Denver, Linda Rondstadt, Olivia Newton-John and Willie Nelson. WNOE-FM, its sister station, had gone to a pure country format, also leaving album rock the previous August. WNOE moved away from an AC lean by 1985 but remained country. The station began to play more classic country and also play some southern sounding pop hits mixed in by 1990. WNOE stayed with this country oldies format until March 1, 1995, when it was sold to Communicom Co. of Louisiana, L.P., who flipped it to a Christian radio format. Communicom Company of Louisiana, L.P. was a subsidiary of Denver-based Communicom Company, which also owned KXEG and KXXT in Phoenix, Arizona, and WDRJ in Detroit, Michigan.

On June 2, 2014, the station went silent. Effective January 9, 2015, WLNO's license was assigned to the WLNO Trust, due to the bankruptcy of Communicom. Effective December 16, 2015, WLNO was sold to Donald Pugh, Sr.'s Eternity Media Group LLC for $1,000 plus a $94,000 payment for access to station property. Pugh returned the station to the air, with an urban gospel format, with segments of the day sold to local preachers.

The Federal Communications Commission (FCC) cancelled the station's license on February 27, 2025, as WLNO had not operated under its licensed facilities since at least October 18, 2021, and did not respond to an FCC inquiry in November 2024. The station had been granted special temporary authority in April 2021 to operate with one tower after losing its other six towers in a storm, but Eternity Media Group did not seek to renew this authority or make any further filings.
