= KAWW =

- Heber Springs, Arkansas; United States
- Frequency: 1370 kHz
- Branding: News Talk 1370

Programming
- Format: News/Talk

Ownership
- Owner: Crain Media Group, LLC
- Sister stations: KEAZ, KRZS, KWCK-AM

History
- First air date: 1967
- Former call signs: KAWW (?-5/2000); KOWS (5/2000-10/2000)

Technical information
- Licensing authority: FCC
- Facility ID: 48742
- Class: D
- Power: 1,000 watts (day only)
- Transmitter coordinates: 35°29′10″N 92°02′05″W
- Translator: 96.3 K242AZ (Searcy)

Links
- Public license information: Public file; LMS

KAWW (1370 AM, "News Talk 1370") is a radio station licensed to serve Heber Springs, Arkansas, United States. The station, established in 1967, is owned by Freedom Broadcasting Inc., LLC.

KAWW broadcasts Classic Country format (simulcast of Cowboy Country 100.7 KEAZ).

The station was most recently assigned the KAWW call sign by the Federal Communications Commission on October 3, 2000.
