= KGFL =

- Clinton, Arkansas; United States
- Frequency: 1110 kHz
- Branding: The Trip Classic Hits 94.7 FM, 97.3 FM & 1110 AM

Programming
- Format: Classic hits
- Affiliations: Westwood One

Ownership
- Owner: Sid King & his daughter Ali King Sugg
- Sister stations: KHPQ

History
- First air date: 1977

Technical information
- Licensing authority: FCC
- Facility ID: 71396
- Class: D
- Power: 5,000 watts day 1,000 watts critical hours
- Transmitter coordinates: 35°33′30″N 92°27′32″W
- Translators: 94.7 K234BV (Clinton); 97.3 K247CQ (Guy)

Links
- Public license information: Public file; LMS
- Webcast: Listen Live
- Website: kgflam.com

KGFL (1110 AM, "The Trip Classic Hits 94.7, 97.3 & 1110") is a radio station broadcasting a classic hits music format. Licensed to Clinton, Arkansas, United States, the station is currently owned by Sid R. King & his daughter Ali King Sugg.

1110 AM is United States clear-channel frequency, on which KFAB in Omaha, Nebraska and WBT in Charlotte, North Carolina are the dominant Class A stations. KGFL must leave the air during nighttime hours to protect the skywave signals of those stations. The FM translators on 94.7 MHz and 97.3 MHz provide 24 hour coverage of the classic hits format.

== History ==
On April 3, 2001, the station's license, along with that of sister station KHPQ, was assigned by Weber-King Radio to King-Sullivan Radio, in late 2024, 49% interest held by the Deanna J. Sullivan Living Trust was transferred to King & Co. Radio Inc., owned by Ali King Sugg (Sid's daughter), the FCC approved this assignment, covering KHPQ among other stations, on September 25, 2025. .
