= KIGL =

Radio station in Fayetteville, Arkansas, United States

Coordinates: 36.468°N 94.174°W

- Seligman, Missouri; United States
- Broadcast area: Fayetteville, Arkansas
- Frequency: 93.3 MHz
- Branding: 93.3 The Eagle

Programming
- Format: Classic rock

Ownership
- Owner: iHeartMedia, Inc.; (iHM Licenses, LLC)
- Sister stations: KEZA, KKIX, KMXF

History
- First air date: 1984 (as KHHC)
- Former call signs: KHHC (1984–1988); KJEM-FM (1988–1990); KESE (1990–1995); KJEM (1995–2002)
- Call sign meaning: K I EaGLe

Technical information
- Licensing authority: FCC
- Facility ID: 35014
- Class: C1
- ERP: 100,000 watts
- HAAT: 150 meters (490 ft)

Links
- Public license information: Public file; LMS
- Webcast: Listen Live
- Website: 933theeagle.iheart.com

KIGL (93.3 FM), known as "93.3 The Eagle", is a classic rock radio station licensed to Seligman, Missouri but based in Fayetteville, Arkansas. KIGL is owned by iHeartMedia, Inc. KIGL serves the Northwest Arkansas, extreme Southwest Missouri, and extreme Northeast Oklahoma region with an ERP of 100,000 watts.

Cities in KIGL's primary coverage include: Fayetteville, Springdale, Bentonville, Rogers, and Siloam Springs, in Arkansas; Neosho, Monett, and Pineville in Missouri; and Grove, Oklahoma. KIGL's signal can be heard as far south as Alma, Arkansas, as far west as Pryor, Oklahoma, as far east as Harrison, Arkansas, and just north of Carthage, Missouri, due to interference from KMXV (93.3 FM) in Kansas City.
