= KCMH (FM) =

- Mountain Home, Arkansas; United States
- Frequency: 91.5 MHz

Programming
- Format: Christian radio
- Affiliations: USA Radio Network

Ownership
- Owner: Christian Broadcasting Group of Mountain Home, Inc
- Sister stations: KCAV

Technical information
- Licensing authority: FCC
- Facility ID: 10913
- Class: C2
- ERP: 26,000 watts
- HAAT: 144.0 meters (472.4 ft)
- Transmitter coordinates: 36°16′17″N 92°25′20″W
- Translators: 92.7 K224CF (West Plains, Missouri); 99.1 K256CF (Harrison)
- Repeater: 90.3 KCAV (Marshall)

Links
- Public license information: Public file; LMS
- Webcast: Listen live
- Website: Official website

KCMH (91.5 MHz) is an FM radio station broadcasting a Christian radio format. Licensed to Mountain Home, Arkansas, United States, the station is currently owned by Christian Broadcasting Group of Mountain Home, Inc., and features programming from USA Radio Network.

== History ==
The station was launched on October 1, 1985. On March 11, 1987, the station changed its call sign to the current KCMH.

Previous logo
