= KTPG =

- Paragould, Arkansas; United States
- Frequency: 99.3 MHz
- Branding: Jill @ 99.3

Programming
- Format: Hot adult contemporary
- Affiliations: NBC News Radio

Ownership
- Owner: MOR Media Inc
- Sister stations: KDRS-FM, KDRS

History
- First air date: 2014
- Call sign meaning: Kare To Playing Games

Technical information
- Licensing authority: FCC
- Facility ID: 171030
- Class: C3
- ERP: 18,500 watts
- HAAT: 117 metres (384 ft)
- Transmitter coordinates: 35°54′32″N 90°37′13″W

Links
- Public license information: Public file; LMS
- Webcast: Listen Live
- Website: Official Website

KTPG (99.3 FM) is a radio station licensed to serve the community of Paragould, Arkansas, and broadcasting to the Jonesboro, Arkansas market. The station is owned by MOR Media Inc. It airs a hot adult contemporary music format.

The station was assigned the KTPG call letters by the Federal Communications Commission on June 1, 2012.
