= KMTB =

- Murfreesboro, Arkansas; United States
- Broadcast area: Nashville-Texarkana
- Frequency: 99.5 MHz
- Branding: B 99.5

Programming
- Format: Country

Ownership
- Owner: Arklatex Radio, Inc.
- Sister stations: KNAS; KBHC

Technical information
- Licensing authority: FCC
- Facility ID: 52175
- Class: C3
- ERP: 25,000 watts
- HAAT: 80 meters (260 ft)
- Transmitter coordinates: 34°0′41″N 93°52′3″W

Links
- Public license information: Public file; LMS
- Webcast: Listen Live
- Website: southwestarkansasradio.com/kmtb/

KMTB is a commercial radio station that broadcasts to the Nashville-Texarkana area on 99.5 FM. The station is licensed in Murfreesboro, Arkansas to Arklatex Radio, Inc..
