= KTPB =

Radio station in Altheimer, Arkansas

Coordinates: 34°9′54″N 91°50′22″W

- Altheimer, Arkansas; United States
- Broadcast area: Pine Bluff, Arkansas
- Frequency: 98.1 MHz
- Branding: 98.1 The Hog

Programming
- Format: Classic country

Ownership
- Owner: Paul Coats and Mike Huckabee; (Bluff City Radio, LLC)
- Operator: PB Radio
- Sister stations: KDPX, KPBA, KTRN

History
- First air date: 2015

Technical information
- Licensing authority: FCC
- Facility ID: 190416
- Class: C3
- ERP: 9,500 watts
- HAAT: 137 meters (449 ft)

Links
- Public license information: Public file; LMS
- Website: www.deltaplexnews.com

KTPB is an FM radio station at 98.1 MHz in Altheimer, Arkansas, serving Pine Bluff. The station is owned by Bluff City Radio, a company of Mike Huckabee and Paul Coats, and operated by PB Radio under a local marketing agreement; it broadcasts a classic country format known as 98.1 The Hog.

== History ==
The station received its callsign in February 2015 and launched later that year. Huckabee and Coats had bought the permits for three stations from Nancy Miller and acquired KTRN from another owner.

In March 2018, Huckabee and Coats struck a local marketing agreement to have the four Pine Bluff stations he owned be operated by PB Radio, which is owned by Mike and Alpha Horne. PB Radio also has the option of purchasing them.
