= KMGC =

- Camden, Arkansas; United States
- Frequency: 104.5 MHz
- Branding: Magic 104.5

Programming
- Format: Urban adult contemporary
- Affiliations: Premiere Networks

Ownership
- Owner: Radio Works, Inc.
- Sister stations: KCXY, KAMD-FM, KBEU

History
- Call sign meaning: K MaGiC 104.5

Technical information
- Licensing authority: FCC
- Facility ID: 29780
- Class: A
- ERP: 3,000 watts
- HAAT: 100.0 meters (328.1 ft)
- Transmitter coordinates: 33°30′14″N 92°48′38″W

Links
- Public license information: Public file; LMS
- Webcast: Listen live
- Website: yesradioworks.com/magic-104-5

KMGC (104.5 FM, "The Rhythm of South Arkansas") is a radio station broadcasting an urban adult contemporary music format. Licensed to Camden, Arkansas, United States, the station is currently owned by Radio Works, Inc. and features programming from Citadel Media.
