= Kena Mphonda =

Malawian diplomat

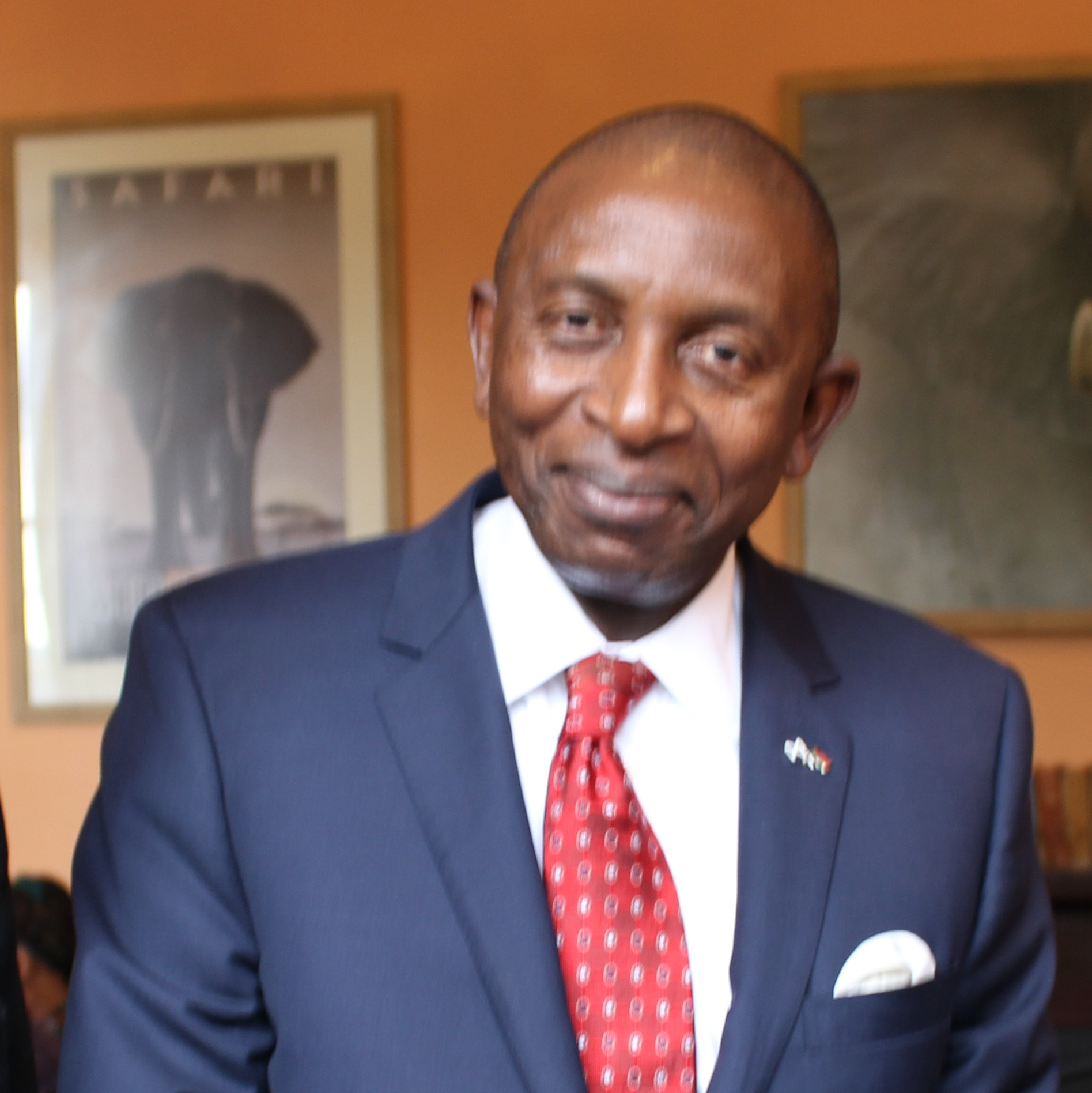
H.E. Kena Mphonda as the new Malawi high Commissioner in 2015

Kena Mphonda is a career diplomat who was the Malawi High Commissioner to the United Kingdom. He was appointed on 14 March 2015. He succeeded Bernard Sande in 2015. He presented his credentials to Queen Elizabeth II of the United Kingdom on 18 October 2015.

Mphonda is also concurrently accredited to Iceland, Ireland, Finland, Portugal, Spain, Sweden, and Malta. He presented credentials to the President of Malta, Marie Louise Coleiro Preca, on 19 October 2015.

== Education ==
He studied at Chancellor College in Malawi where he obtained a Bachelor of Arts degree in 1984, obtained a Master of Arts degree in International Affairs at Ohio University at Athens in 1991. He was a Hubert Humphrey Fellow in International Relations at the American University in Washington DC in 1997/8.

== Career ==
He has previously served in Washington DC at the Malawi Embassy as Deputy Ambassador and as Second Secretary in Bonn, Germany.

He has also served as Chief of Protocol for the Government of Malawi under late President Bingu wa Mutharika, ex President Joyce Banda and the current President, His Excellency Prof. Peter Arthur Mutharika.

For a couple of years, he also served in the Ministry of Finance and the Office of the President and Cabinet in Malawi. In 2018 he was awarded the 2018 Diplomat of the year for Africa in London.

== Personal ==
He is married to Mary Chokani, an Instructional Designer who has a passion for wildlife.

Son to A.H. Mphonda, one of the first Malawian authors to publish school books with Miyambi Yatsopano as the most known in secondary education. His brother, Alick Mphonda, is a graduate of Australian National University working with the National Statistical Office in Malawi as a senior Statistician.
