= KVSA =

- McGehee, Arkansas; United States
- Frequency: 1220 kHz

Programming
- Language: English
- Format: Defunct (was Adult standards/MOR)

Ownership
- Owner: Southeast Arkansas Broadcasters, Inc.

History
- First air date: June 29, 1953
- Last air date: March 3, 2020
- Call sign meaning: Voice of Southeast Arkansas

Technical information
- Facility ID: 61187
- Class: D
- Power: 1,000 watts (day); 40 watts (night)
- Transmitter coordinates: 33°33′39″N 91°23′06″W

KVSA (1220 AM) was a radio station licensed to serve McGehee, Arkansas, United States. The station, was last owned by Southeast Arkansas Broadcasters, Inc.

== History ==
KVSA was founded in 1953 by Abbott F. Kinney. The station broadcast an adult standards/middle of the road music format to southeastern Arkansas.

As of 1 p.m., March 3, 2020, KVSA signed off the air for the last time, and made a Facebook post on its page reporting that fact. The station surrendered its license to the FCC on March 5, 2020, and the FCC cancelled the license on March 12, 2020.
