= KMXF =

Contemporary hit radio station in Lowell, Arkansas

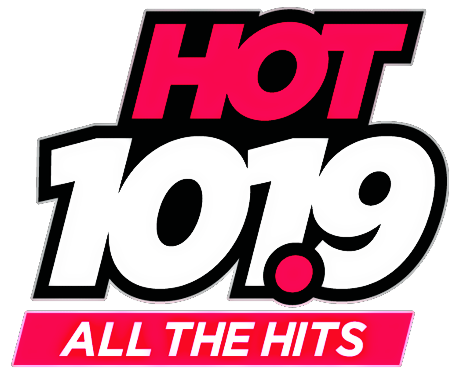

Lowell, Arkansas; United States
- Broadcast area: Northwest Arkansas
- Frequency: 101.9 MHz
- Branding: Hot 101.9

Programming
- Language: English
- Format: Contemporary hit radio
- Affiliations: iHeartRadio; Premiere Networks

Ownership
- Owner: iHeartMedia; (iHM Licenses, LLC)
- Sister stations: KEZA; KIGL; KKIX

History
- First air date: June 30, 1992
- Former call signs: KISK (1992–1994); KKZQ (1994–1997)
- Call sign meaning: Mix Fayetteville (former partial branding)

Technical information
- Licensing authority: FCC
- Facility ID: 48955
- Class: C2
- ERP: 23,000 watts
- HAAT: 216 meters (709 ft)
- Transmitter coordinates: 36°26′24″N 93°58′25″W

Links
- Public license information: Public file; LMS
- Webcast: Listen live (via iHeartRadio)
- Website: hot1019nwa.iheart.com

KMXF (101.9 FM) is a commercial radio station licensed to Lowell, Arkansas, serving the Fayetteville, Arkansas area. The station airs a contemporary hit radio music format.

The station also airs Elvis Duran and the Morning Show, which runs on weekdays from 5 am to 9 a.m. The crew includes Elvis, Danielle, Ghandi, Scary (Skeery Jones), Froggy and Scotty B.
