= KCXY =

Radio station in East Camden–El Dorado, Arkansas

- East Camden, Arkansas; United States
- Broadcast area: El Dorado-Camden-Magnolia, Arkansas
- Frequency: 95.3 MHz
- Branding: Y95

Programming
- Format: Mainstream Country

Ownership
- Owner: Bunyard Broadcasting, Inc.; (RadioWorks, Inc.)
- Sister stations: KAMD-FM, KMGC

History
- First air date: 1987
- Call sign meaning: KCX Y95

Technical information
- Licensing authority: FCC
- Facility ID: 48949
- Class: C1
- ERP: 100,000 watts
- HAAT: 139 meters
- Transmitter coordinates: 33°16′16″N 92°39′17″W

Links
- Public license information: Public file; LMS
- Website: http://www.yesradioworks.com/y95

KCXY (95.3 FM, "Y95") is a radio station licensed to serve East Camden, Arkansas, United States. The station broadcasts a mainstream country format, serving the El Dorado-Camden-Magnolia area.

The station is currently owned by RadioWorks, Inc. and features programming from ABC Radio. Y95 is the area's official home for Arkansas Razorback sports, Camden-Fairview Cardinal sports, and other sporting events throughout the year.
