= KOTN (FM) =

- Gould, Arkansas; United States
- Frequency: 102.5 MHz
- Branding: 105.5 & 102.5 The Duck

Programming
- Format: Classic Country

Ownership
- Owner: Arkansas County Broadcasters, Inc.

History
- First air date: 2000 (as KAFN)
- Former call signs: KAFN (1997–2011)

Technical information
- Licensing authority: FCC
- Facility ID: 81678
- Class: A
- ERP: 6,000 watts
- HAAT: 54 meters
- Transmitter coordinates: 33°58′11″N 91°32′58″W

Links
- Public license information: Public file; LMS

KOTN (102.5 FM) is a radio station broadcasting a classic country format, simulcasting KWAK-FM 105.5 Stuttgart, AR. Licensed to Gould, Arkansas, United States, it serves the area. The station is currently owned by Arkansas County Broadcasters, Inc.

On April 1, 2010, KOTN changed their format from country to oldies, simulcasting KWAK-FM 105.5.

On April 23, 2012, KOTN changed their format from oldies back to classic country, simulcasting KWAK-FM 105.5.
