= KIYS =

Coordinates: 35.9540°N 90.6948°W

- Walnut Ridge, Arkansas; United States
- Broadcast area: Jonesboro, Arkansas
- Frequency: 101.7 MHz (HD Radio)
- Branding: 101.7 Kiss FM

Programming
- Format: Top 40 (CHR)
- Subchannels: HD1: KIYS analog HD2: Oldies "The Oldies Network"; HD3: K-Love; HD4: Variety hits "101.3 Bob FM"

Ownership
- Owner: East Arkansas Broadcasters

History
- First air date: March 27, 1977
- Former call signs: KCAC (1977–1980); KCAZ (1980–1989); KRLW (1989–2010)
- Former frequencies: 106.3 MHz (1977–2010)

Technical information
- Licensing authority: FCC
- Facility ID: 70465
- Class: C2
- ERP: 10,500 watts
- HAAT: 327 meters
- Translators: 94.1 K231BV (Newport, relays HD2); 97.9 K250BH (Jonesboro, relays HD3); 101.3 K267AS (Piggott, relays HD4)

Links
- Public license information: Public file; LMS
- Webcast: Listen Live; Listen Live (HD2); Listen Live (HD4)
- Website: kissjonesboro.com bobfmjonesboro.com (HD4)

KIYS (101.7 FM) is a radio station broadcasting a Top 40 (CHR) format serving the Jonesboro, Arkansas, area. The station is currently owned by East Arkansas Broadcasters.

KIYS broadcast in the HD Radio format.

== History ==
This format was previously located at 101.9 KIYS in the Jonesboro, Arkansas market. On September 10, 2010, the 101.9 KIYS frequency relocated to Crawfordsville, Arkansas where it began to target the Memphis area as "101.9 Radio Now". While located in Jonesboro, the station was CHR as "Kiss FM", owned by Clear Channel, but operated by East Arkansas Broadcasters under a local marketing agreement (LMA). After the 101.9 signal was moved to Crawfordsville, East Arkansas Broadcasting acquired KRLW, which had been at 106.3, and moved the frequency over to 101.7 and relaunched it as "101.7 Kiss FM." KIYS is the only radio station in Arkansas to be an affiliate with Dan Ingram's Top 40 Satellite Survey in the 1980s.

== Subchannel history ==
=== KIYS-HD2 ===
KIYS-HD2 originally carried an active rock format branded as The Buzz, heard on analog FM at 94.1 via translator K231BV in College City. On November 18, 2019, the station dropped the format and began stunting with Christmas music as "94.1 Reindeer Radio", before relaunching as an adult hits station under the Bob FM brand on December 26. The Bob FM format was later dropped, and HD2 (and K231BV at 94.1 FM) now simulcasts the oldies format of KTRQ in Colt.

=== KIYS-HD4 ===
KIYS-HD4 originally served as a simulcast of KBTM (1230 AM). In late 2021, KBTM moved its FM simulcast to translator K271CV (102.1 FM), and HD4 was relaunched as a variety hits format branded as 101.3 Bob FM, relayed on translator K267AS in Piggott.
