= KBPU =

Radio station in De Queen, Arkansas, United States

KBPU and KTYC
KBPU: De Queen, Arkansas; KTYC: Nashville, Arkansas; United States
- Frequencies: KBPU: 88.7 MHz; KTYC: 88.5 MHz
- Branding: Ed 88.7/Ed 88.5

Programming
- Format: Classic hits

Ownership
- Owner: Cossatot Community College; (Board of Trustees of the University of Arkansas)

History
- First air date: KBPU: 2002; KTYC: 2011

Technical information
- Licensing authority: FCC
- Facility ID: KBPU: 92030; KTYC: 175551
- Class: KBPU: A; KTYC: A
- ERP: KBPU: 5,000 watts; KTYC: 5,000 watts
- HAAT: KBPU: 15 meters (49 ft); KTYC: 58.9 meters (193 ft)
- Transmitter coordinates: KBPU: 34°02′33″N 94°22′07″W; KTYC: 33°57′18.5″N 93°52′06.4″W

Links
- Public license information: KBPU: Public file; LMS; KTYC: Public file; LMS
- Webcast: Listen live
- Website: ed88radio.com

KBPU (88.7 FM) and KTYC (88.5 FM) are radio stations in De Queen and Nashville, Arkansas. The two stations form a simulcast known as Ed 88 with a variety/classic hits format. The stations are owned and operated by Cossatot Community College, part of the University of Arkansas System, and maintain studios in De Queen and Nashville.

== History ==
The Federal Communications Commission issued a construction permit for KBPU to Educational Opportunities, Inc. on September 7, 1999, and issued it the KBPU call sign. On July 25, 2002, the permit was assigned to the American Family Association. The station received its license to cover on December 6, 2002. It aired a Christian format and was an affiliate of American Family Radio.

On January 30, 2004, KBPU was sold to IHR Educational Broadcasting. It was silent throughout much of 2005 and 2006. On May 2, 2006, the station was donated to Radio Assist Ministry/Edgewater Broadcasting. It aired a Christian format as an affiliate of Freedom Radio FM. On June 14, 2012, the station was sold to the board of trustees of the University of Arkansas for $67,500.

In 2007, the University of Arkansas had applied for a construction permit for a station in Nashville, which the FCC approved on May 5, 2009. KTYC was granted program test authority in May 2012, initially broadcasting at 850 watts.

In January 2020, the Ed 88 stations entered into a consent decree with the FCC which saw the payment of a $76,000 penalty for broadcasting improper underwriting announcements that impermissibly promoted products or services in 2016.

== See also ==
- Campus radio
- List of college radio stations in the United States
