= KBTM =

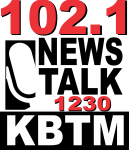
- Jonesboro, Arkansas; United States
- Frequency: 1230 kHz
- Branding: News Talk 102.1 FM KBTM 1230

Programming
- Format: Talk radio
- Affiliations: Premiere Networks

Ownership
- Owner: East Arkansas Broadcasters of Jonesboro, LLC
- Sister stations: KFIN, KIYS, KNEA, KWHF

History
- First air date: March 24, 1930
- Call sign meaning: Beard's Temple of Music

Technical information
- Licensing authority: FCC
- Facility ID: 17692
- Class: C
- Power: 1,000 watts
- Transmitter coordinates: 35°50′28″N 90°39′44″W
- Translator: 102.1 K271CV (Jonesboro)

Links
- Public license information: Public file; LMS
- Webcast: Listen live

KBTM (1230 AM) is a commercial radio station licensed to Jonesboro, Arkansas, United States, and broadcasting a talk radio format. The station is currently owned by East Arkansas Broadcasters of Jonesboro, LLC. Since 2014, KBTM has also served as the broadcast home for Valley View High School football and boys & girls' basketball.

== Past personalities ==
- Clarence Adams, newscaster (1938, 1948, 1953–55)

Ken Miller, newscaster (1980s)
