= KXJK =

Radio station in Forrest City, Arkansas

- Forrest City, Arkansas; United States
- Frequency: 950 kHz
- Branding: 950 am, 106.5 fm, HD-2 93.5 fm

Programming
- Format: Classic hits, news/sports
- Affiliations: Arkansas Radio Network; SportsMap; Premiere Networks; Westwood One

Ownership
- Owner: Forrest City Broadcasting Co.
- Sister stations: KBFC

History
- First air date: 1949

Technical information
- Licensing authority: FCC
- Facility ID: 22054
- Class: D
- Power: 5,000 watts day 87 watts night
- Transmitter coordinates: 34°58′53.3″N 90°51′27.4″W
- Translator: 106.5 K293BS (Forrest City)
- Repeater: (93.5-2) KBFC-HD2 (Forrest City)

Links
- Public license information: Public file; LMS
- Webcast: Listen Live
- Website: kxjkkbfc.com

KXJK (950 AM) is a radio station licensed to serve Forrest City, Arkansas, United States. The station, established in 1949, is owned and operated by the Forrest City Broadcasting Company.

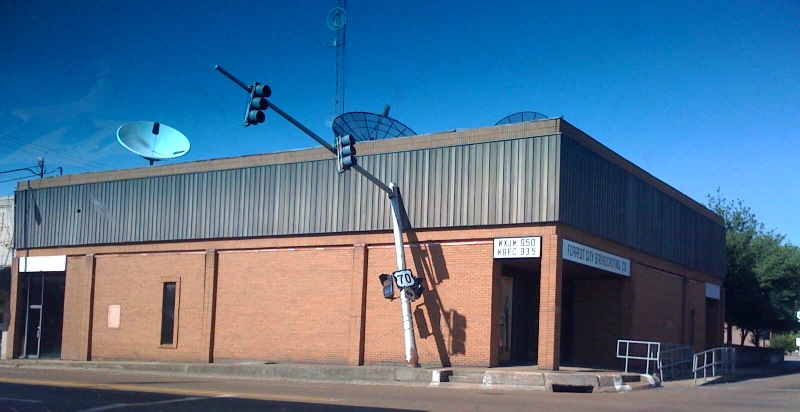
Forrest City Broadcasting Company

== FM Translator ==
In addition to the main station on 950 MHz, the KXJK signal is relayed to an FM translator, which provides both High fidelity sound and the option of FM to listeners.

Broadcast translator for KXJK
Call sign	Frequency	City of license	FID	ERP (W)	HAAT	Class	FCC info
K293BS	106.5 FM	Forrest City, Arkansas	138336	250	147.5 m (484 ft)	D	LMS

== Programming ==
KXJK broadcasts a mixed format and features programming from USA Radio News, Premiere Networks, Westwood One and SportsMap Radio. KXJK airs regional and local news as well as a morning show in simulcast with sister station KBFC. KXJK broadcasts Arkansas Razorbacks baseball.

KXJK also features gospel programming on Sunday Mornings, as well as Monday and Wednesday evenings.

On December 28, 2020, KXJK began broadcasting on the HD2 Channel of KBFC.

== History ==
This station began broadcast operations in 1949.

== Staff ==
- General Manager: Rob Johnson
- Asst. Manager/Sports Manager: Richard Benson
- News Director: Rick Holt
- Administrative Assistant: Berta McMahon
- Engineer: Palmer Johnson
- On Air Personality: Miles J. Kimble
- On Air Personality: Lamont Swanigan
- On Air Personality: J. Fred Houston
