= Kaena =

In Hawaiian, ka ‘ena means "the heat."

== Hawaiian place names ==
- Ka‘ena Point is the westernmost point of the Hawaiian Island of O‘ahu. There is a state park at Ka‘ena Point. There is a USAF Satellite Tracking Station above Ka‘ena Point.
- Kaʻena Ridge is a submerged shield volcano northeast of the island of Oʻahu.
- Ka‘ena is a point and land section on Hawai‘i Island,
- Ka‘ena is the name of the northwestern tip of the Island of Lāna‘i.

== Other uses ==
- Kaena is the name of the main character in the movie Kaena: The Prophecy distributed by Sony Pictures
