= KAAB =

Simulcast of KKIK, Horseshoe Bend
- Batesville, Arkansas; United States
- Frequency: 1130 kHz
- Branding: Outlaw Country

Programming
- Format: Country

Ownership
- Owner: WRD Entertainment, Inc.
- Sister stations: KBTA; KBTA-FM; KKIK; KWOZ; KZLE

History
- First air date: 1980; 46 years ago

Technical information
- Licensing authority: FCC
- Facility ID: 39607
- Class: D
- Power: 1,000 watts day; 20 watts night
- Transmitter coordinates: 35°44′40.3″N 91°38′21.5″W

Links
- Public license information: Public file; LMS
- Website: whiterivernow.com/kkik/

KAAB (1130 AM) is a radio station broadcasting a country music format. Licensed to Batesville, Arkansas, United States, it serves the Batesville area. The station is owned by WRD Entertainment, Inc.

KAAB simulcasts KKIK (106.5 FM) of Horseshoe Bend, Arkansas.
