= KEZA =

Adult contemporary radio station in Fayetteville, Arkansas

- Fayetteville, Arkansas; United States
- Broadcast area: Northwest Arkansas
- Frequency: 107.9 MHz
- Branding: Magic 107.9

Programming
- Language: English
- Format: Adult contemporary
- Affiliations: Premiere Networks

Ownership
- Owner: iHeartMedia; (iHM Licenses, LLC)
- Sister stations: KIGL; KKIX; KMXF

History
- First air date: September 16, 1983
- Call sign meaning: Easy Arkansas (previous format)

Technical information
- Licensing authority: FCC
- Facility ID: 12702
- Class: C
- ERP: 100,000 watts
- HAAT: 384 meters (1,260 ft)
- Transmitter coordinates: 35.853°N 94.026°W

Links
- Public license information: Public file; LMS
- Webcast: Listen live (via iHeartRadio)
- Website: magic1079.iheart.com

KEZA (107.9 FM) is a commercial radio station in Fayetteville, Arkansas, United States, broadcasting a Northwest Arkansas, including Bentonville and Fort Smith. KEZA is owned by iHeartMedia and airs an adult contemporary format, branded as "Magic 107.9". For much of November and December, it switches to all-Christmas music. In the evening, KEZA carries the nationally syndicated Delilah. On Saturday mornings, it carries Ellen K. Both shows are supplied by co-owned Premiere Networks.

KEZA has an effective radiated power (ERP) of 100,000 watts. The transmitter is on Skelton Road in Wyola, Arkansas. The signal covers sections of Arkansas, Oklahoma and Missouri. The radio studios and offices are on East Joyce Boulevard in Fayetteville.

== History ==
On September 16, 1983, KEZA first signed on the air. It was owned by Hamden Communications with studios on First Place in Fayetteville. It chose the call sign KEZA because it played easy listening music.

The station played quarter hour sweeps of mostly instrumental cover versions of popular songs, as well as Hollywood and Broadway show tunes. In the 1980s, as its audience started to age, KEZA added more soft vocals. However, advertisers usually seek young to middle aged listeners, so management decided to eliminate the instrumentals.

On February 14, 1989, it switched to soft adult contemporary music as "Magic 107.9". In August 2000, the station was acquired by Clear Channel Communications, the forerunner of current owner iHeartMedia. In the early 2000s, KEZA moved to a mainstream adult contemporary format.
