= KBHC (FM) =

- Medicine Bow, Wyoming; United States
- Frequency: 101.1 MHz
- Branding: BunkHouse Country

Programming
- Format: Classic country

Ownership
- Owner: Bunkhouse Network, LLC

History
- First air date: September 15, 2025

Technical information
- Facility ID: 190449
- Class: C1
- ERP: 100 watts
- HAAT: −26 metres (−85 ft)
- Transmitter coordinates: 41°53′50.5″N 106°11′57.5″W

KBHC (101.1 MHz) is a commercial radio station licensed to serve Medicine Bow, Wyoming, United States. The station is owned by the Bunkhouse Network, LLC and broadcasts a classic country music format branded as "BunkHouse Country".

The station's origins date back to a 2011 Federal Communications Commission (FCC) filing for a new FM allotment in Medicine Bow, part of a broader effort to expand local radio service to the sparsely populated Carbon County region. The construction permit was eventually acquired by the Bunkhouse Network, LLC. In July 2021, Nanette Valdez-Schwartz was the winning bidder for the Medicine Bow construction permit during FCC Auction 109. Although the post-auction long-form application was filed two weeks past the deadline, the Federal Communications Commission granted a waiver to proceed with the station's development, citing the public interest in establishing a new radio service for the community.

The station was originally intended to be a Saratoga, Wyoming–based station. While originally proposed as a higher-power Class C3 facility, the station's operator applied for a technical downgrade to a Class A facility in late 2025, and its transmitter was moved to Medicine Bow. The station currently operates with an effective radiated power (ERP) of 100 watts.
