= KKIK =

- Horseshoe Bend, Arkansas; United States
- Frequency: 106.5 MHz
- Branding: Outlaw Country 106.5

Programming
- Format: Country

Ownership
- Owner: WRD Entertainment, Inc.
- Sister stations: KAAB; KBTA; KBTA-FM; KWOZ; KZLE

History
- First air date: 2004

Technical information
- Licensing authority: FCC
- Facility ID: 86169
- Class: C3
- ERP: 12,000 watts
- HAAT: 145 meters (476 ft)
- Transmitter coordinates: 36°15′22″N 91°55′23″W

Links
- Public license information: Public file; LMS
- Website: whiterivernow.com/kkik/

KKIK (106.5 FM, "Outlaw Country 106.5") is a radio station broadcasting a country music format. Licensed to Horseshoe Bend, Arkansas, United States, the station is currently owned by WRD Entertainment, Inc. KKIK's sister station is KAAB in Batesville, Arkansas.
