= KWOZ =

Radio station in Mountain View, Arkansas

- Mountain View, Arkansas; United States
- Broadcast area: Searcy, Arkansas; Mountain Home, Arkansas; Batesville, Arkansas; Newport, Arkansas
- Frequency: 103.3 MHz
- Branding: Arkansas 103.3

Programming
- Format: Country music

Ownership
- Owner: WRD Entertainment, Inc.
- Sister stations: KAAB; KBTA; KBTA-FM; KKIK; KZLE

History
- First air date: December 1, 1981

Technical information
- Licensing authority: FCC
- Facility ID: 46336
- Class: C
- ERP: 100,000 watts
- HAAT: 301 meters (988 ft)
- Transmitter coordinates: 35°47′06″N 91°57′45″W

Links
- Public license information: Public file; LMS
- Website: ar1033.com

KWOZ is a radio station airing a country music format licensed to Mountain View, Arkansas, broadcasting on 103.3 FM. The station serves the areas of Searcy, Mountain Home, Batesville, and Newport, and is owned by WRD Entertainment, Inc.
