= KBFC =

- Forrest City, Arkansas; United States
- Frequency: 93.5 MHz (HD Radio)
- Branding: Delta Country 93.5 FM

Programming
- Format: Country
- Subchannels: HD2: Classic hits, news/sports (KXJK simulcast)
- Affiliations: SRN News; USA Radio Network

Ownership
- Owner: Forrest City Broadcasting Co.
- Sister stations: KXJK

History
- First air date: September 22, 1960

Technical information
- Licensing authority: FCC
- Facility ID: 22053
- Class: C3
- ERP: 25,000 watts
- HAAT: 100 meters (330 ft)
- Transmitter coordinates: 34°51′17″N 90°55′02″W

Links
- Public license information: Public file; LMS
- Webcast: Listen Live
- Website: KBFC Online

KBFC (93.5 FM) is a radio station licensed to serve Forrest City, Arkansas, United States. The station, established in 1960, is owned and operated by the Forrest City Broadcasting Company.

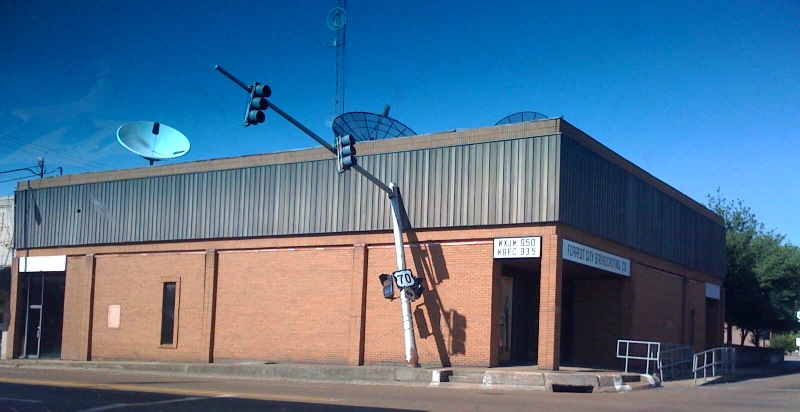
Forrest City Broadcasting Co.

== Programming ==
KBFC broadcasts a country music format and features programming from USA Radio News. In addition to its usual music programming, KBFC airs regional and local news as well as a morning show in simulcast with sister station KXJK. KBFC broadcasts Arkansas Razorbacks football and men's basketball games.

== History ==
This station began broadcast operations on September 22, 1960, as an FM simulcast of Forrest City Broadcasting Company sister station KXJK (950 AM). The station was assigned the KBFC call sign by the Federal Communications Commission.

Originally broadcasting with just 670 watts of effective radiated power, KBFC upgraded its signal to 3,000 watts in 1970. In 1991, the FCC granted the station a new construction permit to relocate its broadcast tower and upgrade to 25,000 watts as a Class C3 station. KBFC began licensed broadcasting from the new site in July 1992.

On December 28, 2020, KBFC began broadcasting in HD. The HD-1 channel is the Delta Country format while HD-2 rebroadcasts KXJK AM 950.

== Staff ==
- General Manager: Rob Johnson
- Assistant Manager/Sports Director: Richard Benson
- News Director: Rick Holt
- Administrative Assistant: Berta McMahon
- Engineer: Palmer Johnson
- On-Air Personality: J. Fred Houston
