= KBTA-FM =

- Batesville, Arkansas; United States
- Frequency: 99.5 MHz
- Branding: 99.5 Your FM

Programming
- Format: Adult contemporary

Ownership
- Owner: WRD Entertainment
- Sister stations: KAAB; KBTA; KKIK; KWOZ; KZLE

History
- First air date: 1999
- Call sign meaning: Batesville, Arkansas

Technical information
- Licensing authority: FCC
- Facility ID: 85325
- Class: A
- ERP: 3,400 watts
- HAAT: 130 meters
- Transmitter coordinates: 35°52′7″N 91°35′14″W

Links
- Public license information: Public file; LMS
- Website: www.whiterivernow.com

KBTA-FM (99.5 FM) is a radio station broadcasting an adult contemporary format. Licensed to Batesville, Arkansas, United States. The station is currently owned by WRD Entertainment.

== See also ==
- List of radio stations in Arkansas
