= KTHS-FM =

- Berryville, Arkansas; United States
- Frequency: 107.1 MHz

Programming
- Format: Country music

Ownership
- Owner: Carroll County Broadcasting, Inc.

History
- First air date: December 19, 1974 (51 years ago)

Technical information
- Licensing authority: FCC
- Facility ID: 35667
- Class: C3
- ERP: 3,200 watts
- HAAT: 201 meters (659 ft)
- Transmitter coordinates: 36°20′45″N 93°29′18″W

Links
- Public license information: Public file; LMS
- Webcast: Listen Live
- Website: http://kthsradio.com/

KTHS-FM (107.1 MHz) is a commercial FM radio station licensed to Berryville, Arkansas. The station broadcasts a country music radio format and is owned by Carroll County Broadcasting, Inc.

== History ==
On December 19, 1974, the station signed on the air. Its original call sign was KAAM and it was co-owned with KTHS 1480 AM. The two stations featured country music formats but were separately programmed. The AM station had more news, talk and features while KAAM was automated with minimal talk and longer sweeps of music. KAAM was a network affiliate of the ABC Information Network.

In 2006, Caroll County Broadcasting bought KTHS-AM-FM for $3.5 million.
