= KWAK (AM) =

- Stuttgart, Arkansas; United States
- Frequency: 1240 kHz
- Branding: Oldies 102.7 & 1240

Programming
- Format: Oldies

Ownership
- Owner: Arkansas County Broadcasters, Inc.
- Sister stations: KWAK-FM

History
- First air date: May 1948
- Call sign meaning: "Quack" (area is noted for ducks)

Technical information
- Licensing authority: FCC
- Facility ID: 2774
- Class: C
- Power: 960 watts (unlimited)
- Transmitter coordinates: 34°29′27″N 91°33′45″W
- Translators: 96.1 K241CY (Stuttgart); 102.7 K274BX (Stuttgart)

Links
- Public license information: Public file; LMS

KWAK (1240 AM) is a radio station broadcasting an oldies format. Licensed to Stuttgart, Arkansas, United States, the station is currently owned by Arkansas County Broadcasters, Inc.

Along with its usual oldies programming, KWAK is an affiliate of the Tennessee Titans radio network.

== History ==
KWAK began broadcasting in May 1948 on 1240 kHz with 250 W power (full-time). Owned by Arkansas Airwaves Company, it was a Mutual affiliate and was "fed many programs from KXLR, North Little Rock, a sister station." Broadcasting Magazine in 1948 said that Melvin Spann was the General Manager. Spann stayed with the station until it was sold to Bobby Caldwell's East Arkansas Broadcasters in 1986. Spann is regarded as a Pioneer of Arkansas broadcasting.

In the 1960's, KWAK was allowed 1000 watts daytime and 250 watts at night, along with most other Class IV stations at the time. Eventually, these stations would be allowed 1000 watts fulltime.

During the 1970s, KWAK had a mixed music format on the weekdays, broadcasting country music from sign-on until 7 PM and Top 40 from 7 PM until the 10 PM sign-off. The station was also a part of the St. Louis Cardinals baseball network. Notable DJs included Roy Preston and Jim Sleuder.

The station's original tower and studio were located at the corner of Buerkle and 19th streets in Stuttgart, Arkansas. For a time in the 1960's and 1970's, the studio moved downtown to 425 S. Main. In the 1980's a new studio building was constructed on the site of the original location on South Buerkle.
