= KTRN =

- White Hall, Arkansas; United States
- Broadcast area: Pine Bluff, Arkansas
- Frequency: 104.5 MHz
- Branding: 104.5 KTRN

Programming
- Format: Adult contemporary
- Affiliations: ABC News Radio; Westwood One

Ownership
- Owner: Bluff City Radio, LLC
- Sister stations: KDPX, KPBA, KTPB

History
- First air date: 1996
- Former call signs: KWDA (1992–1996, CP)
- Call sign meaning: K-TRaiN

Technical information
- Licensing authority: FCC
- Facility ID: 4127
- Class: A
- ERP: 3,000 watts
- HAAT: 88 meters (289 ft)
- Transmitter coordinates: 34°13′13″N 92°04′37″W

Links
- Public license information: Public file; LMS
- Website: KTRN Online

KTRN (104.5 FM, "104.5 KTRN") is a radio station licensed to serve White Hall, Arkansas, United States. The station's broadcast license is held by Bluff City Radio, LLC.

KTRN broadcasts an adult contemporary music format to the Pine Bluff, Arkansas, area.

The station was assigned the call sign KTRN by the Federal Communications Commission on December 18, 1996.

The station's call sign makes an appearance in Train's "Play That Song" music video.
