= KDEW-FM =

- De Witt, Arkansas; United States
- Frequency: 97.3 MHz
- Branding: Country 97.3

Programming
- Format: Country

Ownership
- Owner: Arkansas County Broadcasters

History
- First air date: October 26, 1970
- Call sign meaning: DEW for De Witt

Technical information
- Licensing authority: FCC
- Facility ID: 40747
- Class: C2
- ERP: 50,000 watts
- HAAT: 83 meters (272 ft)
- Transmitter coordinates: 34°25′52″N 91°26′8″W

Links
- Public license information: Public file; LMS
- Webcast: Listen Live
- Website: country973.com

KDEW-FM (97.3 FM, Country 97.3) is a radio station broadcasting a country music music format. Licensed to serve De Witt, Arkansas, United States, the station is currently owned by Arkansas County Broadcasters.
