= KAMD-FM =

- Camden, Arkansas; United States
- Frequency: 97.1 MHz
- Branding: Fox Sports 97.1

Programming
- Format: Sports radio
- Affiliations: Fox Sports Radio

Ownership
- Owner: Bunyard Broadcasting, Inc.; (Radio Works)
- Sister stations: KCXY, KMGC

History
- First air date: December 1968
- Former call signs: KWEH
- Call sign meaning: "Camden"

Technical information
- Licensing authority: FCC
- Facility ID: 8469
- Class: C2
- ERP: 50,000 watts
- HAAT: 139 meters (456 ft)
- Transmitter coordinates: 33°30′14″N 92°48′38″W

Links
- Public license information: Public file; LMS
- Website: yesradioworks.com

KAMD-FM (97.1 FM) is a radio station licensed to Camden, Arkansas, United States. The station airs a sports radio format as an affiliate of Fox Sports Radio, and is owned by Radio Works/Bunyard Broadcasting.
