= KZLE =

- Batesville, Arkansas; United States
- Broadcast area: Jonesboro, Arkansas
- Frequency: 93.1 MHz
- Branding: 93 KZLE

Programming
- Format: Classic rock

Ownership
- Owner: W.R.D. Entertainment, Inc.
- Sister stations: KAAB; KBTA (AM); KBTA-FM; KKIK; KWOZ

History
- First air date: 1982
- Former call signs: KZLE-FM (4/1/1983-4/13/1983)

Technical information
- Licensing authority: FCC
- Facility ID: 72262
- Class: C1
- ERP: 99,000 watts
- HAAT: 300 meters (980 ft)
- Transmitter coordinates: 35°53′29″N 91°43′31″W

Links
- Public license information: Public file; LMS
- Website: whiterivernow.com

KZLE (93.1 FM, "93 KZLE") is a radio station licensed to serve Batesville, Arkansas, United States. The station serves the greater Jonesboro, Arkansas, area. KZLE is owned by W.R.D. Entertainment, Inc. It airs a classic rock music format.

== History ==
The station was founded on March 9, 1982, and assigned the KZLE call letters by the Federal Communications Commission on April 13, 1983. The station first picked up a short-lived MOR format, before turning it down for adult contemporary during 1983, known as "Class FM". In 1989, the station began leaning towards Top 40/CHR, but in 1991, the station returned to adult contemporary under the name "Mix 93". The format lasted until January 1994 when the station dropped adult contemporary for country as "Kicker 93.1". The station dropped the format in 1996 and switched over to a rock format as "93.1 The Max".

In April 2003, the Associated Press Broadcasters Association presented the small-market award for Best Newscast to KZLE and sister stations KWOZ and KBTA-FM.
