= KBEU =

- Bearden, Arkansas; United States
- Frequency: 92.7 MHz
- Branding: K92.7

Programming
- Format: News/Talk

Ownership
- Owner: Radio Works, Inc.
- Sister stations: KMGC

Technical information
- Licensing authority: FCC
- Facility ID: 191500
- Class: A
- ERP: 6,000 watts
- HAAT: 69 metres (226 ft)
- Transmitter coordinates: 33°39′16.3″N 92°40′34.1″W

Links
- Public license information: Public file; LMS
- Webcast: Listen Live
- Website: Official Website

KBEU (92.7 FM) is a radio station licensed to serve the community of Bearden, Arkansas. The station is owned by Radio Works, Inc. It airs a news/talk radio format.

The station was assigned the KBEU call letters by the Federal Communications Commission on November 14, 2013.
