= KPBA (FM) =

Radio station in Pine Bluff, Arkansas

Coordinates: 34°13′16″N 91°58′22″W

- Pine Bluff, Arkansas; United States
- Frequency: 99.3 MHz
- Branding: 99.3 The Beat

Programming
- Format: Urban contemporary

Ownership
- Owner: Paul Coats and Mike Huckabee; (Bluff City Radio, LLC)
- Operator: PB Radio
- Sister stations: KTPB, KDPX, KTRN

History
- First air date: 2015
- Former call signs: KHUC (March 16, 2015–July 30, 2018)
- Call sign meaning: Pine Bluff, Arkansas

Technical information
- Licensing authority: FCC
- Facility ID: 190417
- Class: A
- ERP: 6,000 watts
- HAAT: 46 meters (151 ft)

Links
- Public license information: Public file; LMS
- Website: www.deltaplexnews.com

KPBA is an FM radio station at 99.3 MHz in Pine Bluff, Arkansas. The station is owned by Bluff City Radio, a company of Mike Huckabee and Paul Coats, and operated by PB Radio under a local marketing agreement; it broadcasts an urban contemporary format known as 99-3 The Beat.

== History ==
The station received its first callsign in February 2015 as KPBA, reviving a callsign previously used at 1270 AM, and changed its calls to KHUC on March 16, launching as oldies station "Super Oldies 99.3". Huckabee and Coats had bought the permits for three stations from Nancy Miller. It later became a talk station known as "K-Huc 99.3".

In March 2018, Huckabee and Coats struck a local marketing agreement to have the four Pine Bluff stations he owned be operated by PB Radio, which is owned by Mike and Alpha Horne. PB Radio also has the option of purchasing them.

On July 31, 2018, as part of a format shuffle at Bluff City Radio, this station took on the KPBA callsign and urban contemporary format previously at 101.3. The oldies format moved to that frequency, which became KDPX.
