= KXXA =

Radio station in Monette, Arkansas, United States (1964–1986)

- Monette, Arkansas; United States
- Frequency: 1560 kHz

Ownership
- Owner: Frederick D. Reagan

History
- First air date: September 1964; 61 years ago
- Last air date: 1986; 40 years ago
- Former call signs: KBIB (1964–1982)

Technical information
- Facility ID: 22482
- Power: 250 watts (daytime only)
- Transmitter coordinates: 33°32′42″N 89°13′58.8″W

KXXA was a radio station on 1560 AM in Monette, Arkansas, United States, operating between 1964 and 1986.

== History ==
The Buffalo Island Broadcasting Company signed on KBIB in September 1964. The station was sold to George Norman Wimpy in 1967, Buffalo Island Communications in 1971, Craighead County Broadcasting in 1974, and KBIB Radio in 1977. After owner Leon Buck died in 1980 and the station transferred to Mack Toombs, Frederick D. Reagan acquired KBIB in 1982 for $80,000 and gave it new KXXA call letters. KXXA aired a country format. The license was deleted by the Federal Communications Commission on December 11, 1986.
