= KNAS =

- Nashville, Arkansas; United States
- Frequency: 98.7 MHz
- Branding: The Maverick Classic Country 98.7

Programming
- Format: Classic country

Ownership
- Owner: Arklatex Radio
- Sister stations: KBHC, KMTB

History
- First air date: 1977

Technical information
- Licensing authority: FCC
- Facility ID: 54822
- Class: A
- ERP: 6,000 watts
- HAAT: 62 meters (203 ft)
- Transmitter coordinates: 34°0′41″N 93°52′3″W

Links
- Public license information: Public file; LMS
- Webcast: Listen Live
- Website: Official Website

KNAS (98.7 FM) is a radio station broadcasting a classic country format. It is licensed to Nashville, Arkansas, United States. The station is currently owned by Arklatex Radio. On May 13th 2025 after almost 50 years of Broadcasting on 105.5 KNAS MOVED DOWN THE DIAL TO 98.7
