= KKIX =

Radio station in Fayetteville, Arkansas, United States

Coordinates: 36.021°N 94.218°W

- Fayetteville, Arkansas; United States
- Broadcast area: Fayetteville and Northwest Arkansas
- Frequency: 103.9 MHz
- Branding: KIX 104

Programming
- Format: Country
- Affiliations: Premiere Networks

Ownership
- Owner: iHeartMedia; (iHM Licenses, LLC)
- Sister stations: KEZA, KIGL, KMXF

History
- First air date: October 1, 1966; 59 years ago
- Former call signs: KNWA (1966–1983)
- Call sign meaning: "Kix"

Technical information
- Facility ID: 48951
- Class: C1
- ERP: 100,000 watts
- HAAT: 147 meters (482 ft)

Links
- Webcast: Listen Live
- Website: kix104.iheart.com

KKIX (103.9 FM) is a radio station in Fayetteville, Arkansas with a country music format. The station is owned and operated by iHeartMedia. The station was previously home to KNWA Radio.
