= KDRS-FM =

- Paragould, Arkansas; United States
- Broadcast area: Jonesboro, Arkansas
- Frequency: 107.1 MHz
- Branding: 107.1 Jack FM

Programming
- Format: Adult hits
- Affiliations: Jack FM network

Ownership
- Owner: Mor Media, Inc.
- Sister stations: KDRS, KTPG

History
- First air date: March 5, 1983
- Former call signs: KLQZ (1983–1999)

Technical information
- Licensing authority: FCC
- Facility ID: 59150
- Class: A
- ERP: 3,000 watts
- HAAT: 129 meters
- Transmitter coordinates: 36°1′46″N 90°35′50″W

Links
- Public license information: Public file; LMS
- Webcast: Listen live
- Website: neajackfm.com

KDRS-FM (107.1 MHz, "Jack FM") is a radio station broadcasting an adult hits format. Licensed to Paragould, Arkansas, United States, it serves the Jonesboro area. The station is currently owned by Mor Media, Inc.
