= KHPQ =

- Clinton, Arkansas; United States
- Frequency: 92.1 MHz
- Branding: Hot Country - Q 92.1

Programming
- Format: Country music

Ownership
- Owner: King-Sullivan Radio

Technical information
- Licensing authority: FCC
- Facility ID: 71395
- Class: C3
- ERP: 10,000 watts
- HAAT: 156 meters (512 ft)
- Transmitter coordinates: 35°38′37″N 92°27′34″W

Links
- Public license information: Public file; LMS
- Website: infozark.net/khpq/index.htm

KHPQ is a radio station airing a country music format licensed to Clinton, Arkansas, broadcasting on 92.1 FM. The station is owned by King-Sullivan Radio.
