= KENA (AM) =

- Mena, Arkansas; United States
- Frequency: 1450 kHz
- Branding: Good News 1450

Programming
- Format: Defunct (was gospel music)

Ownership
- Owner: Ouachita Broadcasting, Inc

History
- First air date: 1950
- Last air date: 2024

Technical information
- Licensing authority: FCC
- Facility ID: 50773
- Class: C
- Power: 1,000 watts unlimited
- Transmitter coordinates: 34°34′23.2″N 94°14′55.2″W

Links
- Public license information: Public file; LMS

KENA (1450 AM) was a radio station licensed to Mena, Arkansas, United States. The station was owned by Ouachita Broadcasting, Inc.

The Federal Communications Commission cancelled the station’s license on September 5, 2024.
