= KARV-FM =

- Ola, Arkansas; United States
- Broadcast area: Hot Springs Village, Arkansas; Russellville, Arkansas
- Frequency: 101.3 MHz
- Branding: KARV 101.3 FM 610 AM

Programming
- Format: Talk radio

Ownership
- Owner: Bobby Caldwell; (EAB of Russellville, LLC)
- Sister stations: KARV

History
- Call sign meaning: "Arkansas River Valley"

Technical information
- Licensing authority: FCC
- Facility ID: 78267
- Class: A
- ERP: 740 watts
- HAAT: 277.0 meters (908.8 ft)
- Transmitter coordinates: 34°59′34″N 93°11′35″W

Links
- Public license information: Public file; LMS
- Website: www.karvradio.com

KARV-FM (101.3 FM) is a radio station licensed to Ola, Arkansas, United States. The station is currently owned by Bobby Caldwell's EAB of Russellville, LLC.
