= KDPX (FM) =

Radio station in Pine Bluff, Arkansas

- Pine Bluff, Arkansas; United States
- Frequency: 101.3 MHz
- Branding: Oldies 101.3 KDPX

Programming
- Format: Oldies
- Affiliations: Premiere Networks

Ownership
- Owner: Paul Coats and Mike Huckabee; (Bluff City Radio, LLC)
- Operator: PB Radio
- Sister stations: KTPB, KPBA, KTRN

History
- First air date: 2015
- Former call signs: KHUC (2015); KPBA (2015–2018)
- Call sign meaning: "Delta Plex"

Technical information
- Licensing authority: FCC
- Facility ID: 190418
- Class: C3
- ERP: 13,500 watts
- HAAT: 137 meters (449 ft)
- Transmitter coordinates: 34°9′54.4″N 91°50′22.5″W

Links
- Public license information: Public file; LMS
- Webcast: Listen live
- Website: www.deltaplexnews.com/oldies-1013

KDPX is an FM radio station at 101.3 MHz in Pine Bluff, Arkansas. The station is owned by Bluff City Radio, a company of Mike Huckabee and Paul Coats, and operated by PB Radio under a local marketing agreement; it broadcasts an oldies format known as Oldies 101.3.

== History ==
The station received its first callsign in March 2015 as KHUC and changed its calls to KPBA on March 16, launching as urban contemporary station "101-3 The Beat". Huckabee and Coats had bought the permits for three stations from Nancy Miller and acquired KTRN from another owner.

In March 2018, Huckabee and Coats struck a local marketing agreement to have the four Pine Bluff stations he owned be operated by PB Radio, which is owned by Mike and Alpha Horne. PB Radio also has the option of purchasing them.

On July 21, 2018, as part of a format shuffle at PB Radio, the urban contemporary format and KPBA calls moved to 99.3, and 101.3 became an oldies station under the KDPX callsign.
