= KZYQ (Lake Village, Arkansas) =

- Lake Village, Arkansas; United States
- Frequency: 103.5 MHz

Programming
- Format: Urban contemporary

Ownership
- Owner: Community Broadcast Group, Inc.; (M.R.S. Ventures, Inc.)
- Sister stations: KRKD

History
- First air date: 1996
- Last air date: 2007
- Former call signs: KEGT (1992–1995); KDTL (1995–1997); KZYQ (1997); KDTL (1997–1998)

Technical information
- Facility ID: 16551
- Class: C3
- ERP: 25,000 watts
- HAAT: 100 meters (330 feet)
- Transmitter coordinates: 33°17′4″N 91°13′3″W

KZYQ (103.5 FM) was an American radio station licensed to serve Lake Village, Arkansas, United States. The station was most recently owned by Community Broadcast Group, Inc., and the broadcast license was held by M.R.S. Ventures, Inc. When it went off the air permanently in early 2007, it broadcast an urban contemporary music format branded as "Star 103".

The station was assigned the KZYQ call letters by the Federal Communications Commission on March 9, 1998.

== Ownership ==
In September 2003, Community Broadcast Group Inc. (Jerry Russell, president) reached an agreement to purchase six stations, including KZYQ, from Delta Radio Inc. (Larry Fuss, president) for a reported combined sale price of $1.5 million.

In June 2006, the station's owner, Jerry D. Russell, suffered a stroke. The station was being operated by another broadcaster, Hodges Broadcasting LLC, under a local marketing agreement but that operator was unable to obtain the financing to purchase the station. With Hodges gone and Russell unable to operate the station himself, KZYQ went off the air for good in early 2007. In a February 2011 letter to the FCC, the owner indicated that he was surrendering the station's broadcast license as well as the licenses for ten sister stations in similar dire circumstances. On May 2, 2011, the station's license was cancelled and the KZYQ call sign assignment was deleted permanently from the FCC database.
