= KTRQ =

- Colt, Arkansas; United States
- Broadcast area: Memphis, Tennessee
- Frequency: 102.3 MHz
- Branding: Oldies 102.3

Programming
- Format: Oldies
- Affiliations: ABC News Radio

Ownership
- Owner: East Arkansas Broadcasters

History
- First air date: 1969 (as KBRI-FM)
- Former call signs: KBRI-FM (1969–1985); KQMC-FM (1985–1998)

Technical information
- Licensing authority: FCC
- Facility ID: 67701
- Class: C2
- ERP: 40,000 watts
- HAAT: 167 meters (548 ft)
- Transmitter coordinates: 35°03′15″N 90°44′39″W
- Repeater: 101.7 KIYS-HD2 (Walnut Ridge)

Links
- Public license information: Public file; LMS
- Webcast: Listen Live
- Website: ktrq.com

KTRQ (102.3 FM) is a radio station licensed to Colt, Arkansas.

The station plays an oldies format, bringing back the top performing songs of the 1950s and 1960s. The powerful 40,000 watt FM signal makes it listenable in a three-state region. Memphis, Tennessee, is the largest city in its primary coverage area. The station is the home of the long-running "Pig and Whistle Show" which airs Sunday nights with legendary disc jockey Alex Ward.

KTRQ was originally a 3,000 watt station in Brinkley, Arkansas, before its parent company, East Arkansas Broadcasters, opted to move the tower just outside Forrest City, Arkansas, allowing the signal to be significantly upgraded.

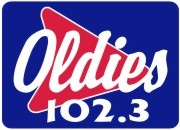
Logo before HD2/translator simulcast
