= KBHC (Arkansas) =

Radio station in Nashville, Arkansas (1959–2019)

Coordinates: 33°55′45.4″N 93°51′1.7″W

- Nashville, Arkansas; United States
- Broadcast area: Texarkana
- Frequency: 1260 kHz

Programming
- Format: Spanish

Ownership
- Owner: Arklatex Radio, Inc.
- Sister stations: KMTB; KNAS

History
- First air date: 1959
- Last air date: March 12, 2019
- Call sign meaning: Keep Building Howard County

Technical information
- Facility ID: 2310
- Class: D
- Power: 500 watts day only

KBHC (1260 AM) was a radio station serving the Texarkana area with a Hispanic format. The station was under the ownership of Arklatex Radio, Inc.

Established in 1959, the station served the Howard County and Texarkana regions for sixty years before its license was cancelled by the Federal Communications Commission (FCC) in 2019.

The station was founded by R.G. McKeever and began regular broadcast operations in May 1959. The call letters were originally selected as an acronym for the civic slogan "Keep Building Howard County" For much of its early history, KBHC operated as a "daytimer," providing local news, agricultural reports, and music to the community from its studios at 1513 S. Fourth Street. In the 1980s, the station was owned by the Gathright family, with Annie Nell Gathright serving as president and Bill Gathright leading the news department.

Initially, the station carried a country and western format. For many years, it broadcast from a distinctive facility at 1513 S. Fourth St., where local announcers played vinyl records on turntables. In its later years, the station was acquired by Arklatex Radio, Inc. and transitioned to a Spanish-language format to serve the regional Hispanic community.

Arklatex Radio, Inc., which managed the station alongside its FM sisters, KNAS and KMTB. KBHC ceased operations on May 28, 2017. Due to being silent for more than a year, the Federal Communications Commission officially cancelled the station's license and deleted the call sign on March 12, 2019.
