= KRMN (FM) =

Radio station at University of Arkansas Rich Mountain

Mena, Arkansas; United States
- Frequency: 89.3 MHz

Programming
- Format: Defunct (formerly Variety)

Ownership
- Owner: University of Arkansas Rich Mountain

History
- First air date: 2011
- Last air date: January 31, 2020

Technical information
- Licensing authority: FCC
- Facility ID: 173306
- Class: A
- ERP: 1,800 watts
- HAAT: 11.9 meters (39 ft)
- Transmitter coordinates: 34°35′35″N 94°13′16″W

Links
- Public license information: Public file; LMS

KRMN (89.3 FM) was a radio station licensed to serve the community of Mena, Arkansas. The station was owned by University of Arkansas Rich Mountain and aired a variety format.

The station was assigned the KRMN call letters by the Federal Communications Commission on March 22, 2010.

The station discontinued its operations on January 31, 2020, and surrendered its license to the Federal Communications Commission on February 11, 2020. The FCC canceled KRMN's license on February 12, 2020.
