= KDRS (AM) =

- Paragould, Arkansas; United States
- Broadcast area: Jonesboro, Arkansas
- Frequency: 1490 kHz
- Branding: iRock 103.7

Programming
- Format: Mainstream rock

Ownership
- Owner: Mor Media, Inc.
- Sister stations: KDRS-FM, KTPG

History
- First air date: January 1, 1947

Technical information
- Licensing authority: FCC
- Facility ID: 59151
- Class: C
- Power: 1,000 watts
- Transmitter coordinates: 36°3′01″N 90°27′44″W
- Translator: 103.7 K279CQ (Paragould)

Links
- Public license information: Public file; LMS
- Webcast: Listen Live
- Website: irocknea.com

KDRS (1490 kHz) is an AM radio station broadcasting a mainstream rock format. Licensed to Paragould, Arkansas, United States, it serves the Jonesboro area. The station is currently owned by Mor Media, Inc.
