= KWAK-FM =

- Stuttgart, Arkansas; United States
- Frequency: 105.5 MHz
- Branding: 105.5 The Duck

Programming
- Format: Classic country

Ownership
- Owner: Arkansas County Broadcasters, Inc.
- Sister stations: KWAK

History
- Call sign meaning: "Quack" (area is noted for ducks)

Technical information
- Licensing authority: FCC
- Facility ID: 2775
- Class: A
- ERP: 2,700 watts
- HAAT: 105 meters (344 ft)
- Transmitter coordinates: 34°25′52″N 91°26′08″W

Links
- Public license information: Public file; LMS

KWAK-FM (105.5 FM) is a radio station broadcasting a classic country music format. Licensed to Stuttgart, Arkansas, United States, the station is currently owned by Arkansas County Broadcasters, Inc.

== Programming ==
Along with its usual classic country music programming, KWAK-FM is an affiliate of the Tennessee Titans radio network.

== In popular culture ==
Several characters in the Sam the Dog print and web comic listen to or work for a fictional talk radio station known as "KWAK 92.9, Quack Radio". The station is depicted as a rundown shack on the edge of an unnamed middle-sized American city.
