= KDQN-FM =

Radio station in De Queen, Arkansas

- De Queen, Arkansas; United States
- Broadcast area: Texarkana, Arkansas
- Frequency: 92.1 MHz

Programming
- Format: Country

Ownership
- Owner: Jay W. Bunyard & Teresa Bunyard; (Bunyard Broadcasting, Inc.)
- Sister stations: KDQN (AM)

Technical information
- Licensing authority: FCC
- Facility ID: 30599
- Class: C2
- ERP: 50,000 watts
- HAAT: 150.0 meters (492.1 ft)
- Transmitter coordinates: 34°13′35″N 94°17′35″W

Links
- Public license information: Public file; LMS

KDQN-FM (92.1 MHz) is a radio station broadcasting a country music format. Licensed to De Queen, Arkansas, United States, the station serves the Texarkana area. The station is currently owned by Jay W. Bunyard & Teresa Bunyard, through licensee Bunyard Broadcasting, Inc. KDQN is home of The Morning Brew, a morning radio show hosted by Tyler Massey, with sibling cohosts Patrick Massey and Jennifer Massey, and Greg Revels.

Former logo
