= KBTA (AM) =

- Batesville, Arkansas; United States
- Frequency: 1340 kHz
- Branding: 1340 KBTA - A Lifetime of Music and Memories

Programming
- Format: Oldies/Adult Standards
- Affiliations: CBS Radio News

Ownership
- Owner: White River Now/WRD Entertainment
- Sister stations: KAAB; KBTA-FM; KKIK; KWOZ; KZLE

History
- First air date: July 15, 1950
- Call sign meaning: Batesville, Arkansas

Technical information
- Licensing authority: FCC
- Facility ID: 72260
- Class: C
- Power: 1,000 watts unlimited
- Transmitter coordinates: 35°44′39″N 91°38′21″W

Links
- Public license information: Public file; LMS

KBTA (1340 kHz) is a radio station licensed to Batesville, Arkansas, United States. The station is currently owned by White River Now/WRD Entertainment and features a oldies/adult standards music format, along with local news, CBS Radio News, St. Louis Cardinal Baseball, and Kansas City Chiefs Football.
