= KARV (AM) =

- Russellville, Arkansas; United States
- Frequency: 610 kHz
- Branding: KARV 101.3FM - 610AM

Programming
- Format: Talk radio
- Affiliations: Premiere Networks

Ownership
- Owner: Bobby Caldwell; (EAB of Russellville, LLC)
- Sister stations: KARV-FM

History
- First air date: February 25, 1947
- Call sign meaning: Arkansas River Valley

Technical information
- Licensing authority: FCC
- Facility ID: 19827
- Class: B
- Power: 1,000 watts (day); 500 watts (night)
- Transmitter coordinates: 35°17′56″N 93°9′9″W
- Translators: 93.1 K226CU (Russellville); 98.3 K252FX (Dardanelle)
- Repeater: 101.3 KARV-FM (Ola)

Links
- Public license information: Public file; LMS
- Website: KARVRadio.com

KARV (610 AM) is a commercial radio station licensed to Russellville, Arkansas, United States. Simulcast with KARV-FM, both stations are owned by Bobby Caldwell's EAB of Russellville, LLC. They carry a talk format with a mix of local and national programs.

== History ==
=== Early Years on 1490 AM ===
On February 25, 1947, the radio station first signed on as KXRJ. It was set up on the campus of Arkansas Tech University. The station operated with 250 watts on 1490 AM, and was a network affiliate of the Mutual Broadcasting System. The original owners were Russ Horne and Jerrell Shepherd, who were brothers-in-law. In the early 1950s, Shepherd sold his interests in the station and started a successful broadcasting company based in Moberly, Missouri. The Horne Family operated the radio station for a number of years, growing its popularity.

In 1968, the radio station changed its call sign from KXRJ to KARV, standing for the Arkansas River Valley. Station ownership moved from Russ Horne to his son Mike. The family also owned KWCK-KSER in Searcy, Arkansas. During the 1960s and 1970s, the stations were managed by L.L. "Doc" Bryan, who would go on to serve the Russellville area as a state representative, and was later the Arkansas legislature's Speaker of the House. After Bryan departed, Kermit Womack became the General Manager of the station.

=== Move to AM 610 ===
In 1980, KARV made the move from 1490 AM to the more powerful frequency of 610 AM. With its low spot on the dial, KARV 610 covers a large chunk of the state of Arkansas. A new four tower directional array was built outside of Arkansas Tech's campus. The same year, Womack departed KARV to operate his own station in Rogers, Arkansas.

During the 1980s, the Horne Family operated successful radio stations in Texas, Kansas, and would later acquire KMUS and KKWK in Muskogee, Oklahoma. Later beset by financial problems, Horne sold all of his stations. In 1992, KARV was sold for $250,000 to former manager Kermit Womack. In 1998, KARV signed on an FM station at 101.3 FM, licensed to Ola, Arkansas. In 2001, the Womack Family signed on 105.5 KYEL in Danville.

=== Personalities ===
In 1998, longtime personalities Johnny Story and Tom Kamerling, along with several key sales and administrative employees, moved to the River Valley Radio group consisting of KCJC, KWKK, KCAB, and KVLD.

In 2016, the three stations were sold to EAB of Russellville, LLC, owners of the four competing radio stations. Much of the news/talk programming airing on former competitor KCAB-AM is now airing on KARV as of November 2016.

A number of notable broadcasters worked at KARV through the years including congressman Steve Womack (R-Arkansas), son of former owner Kermit Womack.
