= KDQN (AM) =

- De Queen, Arkansas; United States
- Frequency: 1390 kHz

Programming
- Language: Spanish
- Format: Spanish Music

Ownership
- Owner: Jay W. Bunyard & Teresa Bunyard; (Bunyard Broadcasting, Inc.)
- Sister stations: KDQN-FM

Technical information
- Licensing authority: FCC
- Facility ID: 30600
- Class: D
- Power: 500 watts day
- Transmitter coordinates: 34°1′57″N 94°19′43″W
- Translators: K283CT (104.5 MHz, De Queen)

Links
- Public license information: Public file; LMS

KDQN (1390 AM) is a radio station broadcasting a Spanish music format. Licensed to De Queen, Arkansas, United States. The station is currently owned by Jay W. Bunyard & Teresa Bunyard, through licensee Bunyard Broadcasting, Inc.
