= WGRM-FM =

- Greenwood, Mississippi; United States
- Frequency: 93.9 MHz
- Branding: Blazin' 93.9 FM

Programming
- Format: Urban oldies

Ownership
- Owner: Christian Broadcasters of Greenwood, Inc.
- Sister stations: WFRK

History
- First air date: 1989 (at 101.9)
- Last air date: 2022
- Former frequencies: 101.9 MHz (1989–1997)
- Call sign meaning: Greenwood, Mississippi

Technical information
- Licensing authority: FCC
- Facility ID: 11889
- Class: C3
- ERP: 12,000 watts
- HAAT: 90 meters (300 ft)
- Transmitter coordinates: 33°32′2″N 90°11′42″W

Links
- Public license information: Public file; LMS

WGRM-FM (93.9 FM) was an American radio station licensed to serve the community of Greenwood, Mississippi, United States. The station, established in 1989 by Clay Ewing, was last owned and operated by Christian Broadcasters of Greenwood, Inc. WGRM-FM broadcasts to the northwestern central region of Mississippi.

== History ==
=== Family tradition ===
The Ewing family launched WGRM (1240 AM) in 1938 with studios in Grenada, Mississippi. The station, under the ownership of P.K. Ewing, Sr., relocated to Greenwood in 1939 beginning a six-decade history of Ewing family radio station ownership in Mississippi. On February 20, 1989, ownership of WGRM was formally transferred from Frances G. Ewing to Clay Ewing.

=== Early days ===
Less than three months later, on May 15, 1989, the Federal Communications Commission (FCC) granted a construction permit for an FM sister station for WGRM to be built in Greenwood. The station would broadcast at a frequency of 101.9 megahertz with 3,000 watts of effective radiated power from an antenna at 100 meters (330 ft) in height above average terrain. on a new broadcast tower at 33°31′55″N 90°11′38″W The new station was assigned the call sign "WGRM-FM" by the FCC on June 23, 1989.

Construction was completed in November 1989, nearly one year ahead of the FCC's November 15, 1990, deadline, and WGRM-FM applied for its initial broadcast license. The FCC granted the license on September 9, 1991.

=== Changes ===
In December 1994, the station applied for permission to increase its effective radiated power to 6,000 watts. The FCC granted the request on August 16, 1995. Less than two weeks before this decision, the station applied for a new construction permit to relocate the broadcast tower to 35°35′25″N 90°18′55″W, increase the effective radiated power to 25,000 watts, and to upgrade the station from Class A to Class C3 at a new frequency of 93.9 MHz. The FCC granted this permit on January 26, 1996. While that construction was underway, the station applied for still further changes to tower height, effective radiated power, and transmitter location on August 8, 1996. The FCC granted these revised parameters on March 18, 1997. In August 1997, the station applied for a new license to cover these changes and the FCC granted it on December 29, 1997.

The station filed a final application in May 1998 to change its tower height, antenna height, and power to the allow it to share an antenna with its AM sister station, WGRM, as the owners had prepared for in 1989. The shared tower at 33°32′2″N 90°11′42″W allowed for an antenna height of 90 meters (300 ft) with 12,000 watts of effective radiated power. The FCC granted the new construction permit on August 28, 1998.

=== Willis era ===
In December 1998, after six decades of Ewing-family broadcasting history in Greenwood, Clay Ewing made a deal to sell both WGRM-FM and AM sister station WGRM to Willis Broadcasting Corporation, based in Norfolk, Virginia. Willis Broadcasting Corporation was wholly owned by Levi E. Willis, Sr. The FCC approved the deal on February 22, 1999, and the transaction was formally consummated on March 31, 1999.

When Willis Broadcasting Corporation acquired WGRM and WGRM-FM, it owned only one other radio station: WIZK in Bay Springs, Mississippi. Although it would later sell WIZK, by mid-2005 the company held the broadcast licenses for eight radio stations across Louisiana and Mississippi. In July 2005, owner Levi Willis applied to the FCC to transfer the licenses for WGRM and WGRM-FM to a new company called Christian Broadcasting of Greenwood, Inc. These would be the only two stations held by this new company. The FCC swiftly approved the transfer on July 29, 2005, and the transaction was formally consummated on January 1, 2006.

Christian Broadcasting of Greenwood's sole shareholder, Levi E. Willis, Sr., died on February 20, 2009, at the age of 79. In March 2009, his estate notified the FCC of the involuntary transfer of control of the license holder. The FCC approved the transfer of control to the Estate of Levi E. Willis, Sr., with Joseph L. Lindsey as executor, on May 13, 2009.

On May 14, 2017, WGRM-FM changed its format from urban gospel to urban oldies, branded as "Blaziin' 93.9". (info taken from stationintel.com)

The WGRM and WGRM-FM licenses were deleted on February 2, 2022.

== Former personalities ==
Past on-air personalities on WGRM-FM include Rose Mathews Ewing, known as the "Weather Lady", who read weather forecasts on WGRM and WGRM-FM while her husband Clay Ewing owned the stations. Rose Ewing died of heart failure in May 2006 at the age of 66. Clay Ewing died six months later on November 23, 2006, at the age of 67. In addition to his role with the radio stations, Clay Ewing served one term as mayor of Greenwood from 1973 to 1977.
