= WGRM (AM) =

- Greenwood, Mississippi; United States
- Frequency: 1240 kHz
- Branding: Hot 1240 AM

Programming
- Format: Top 40 (CHR)

Ownership
- Owner: Christian Broadcasting of Greenwood, Inc.
- Sister stations: WGRM-FM; WFRK

History
- First air date: 1938
- Last air date: February 2, 2022
- Call sign meaning: Greenwood, Mississippi

Technical information
- Facility ID: 68577
- Class: C
- Power: 720 watts (unlimited)
- Transmitter coordinates: 33°32′2″N 90°11′42″W

WGRM (1240 AM) was an American radio station licensed to serve Greenwood, Mississippi, United States. Established in 1938 by P.K. Ewing, the station was owned by the Ewing family for 60 years. WGRM was last owned by Christian Broadcasting of Greenwood, Inc.

WGRM broadcast to the northwestern central region of Mississippi. In the 1940s, the station aired live gospel performances by the Famous St. John's Quartet of Inverness, Mississippi, whose young guitarist would later find fame as B.B. King.

== History ==
=== Early days ===
This station first signed on the air in 1938 with studios in Grenada, Mississippi. The station, broadcasting at 1240 kilohertz with 250 watts of power, was assigned the call sign "WGRM" by the Federal Communications Commission (FCC). In 1939, the station relocated to the second floor of a building at 222 Howard Street in Greenwood, Mississippi, where it would remain for a decade. The station launched under the ownership of P.K. Ewing, Sr., with Fayette C. Ewing as general manager.

By 1943, with the Ewing family in control, Herb Abramson was named the station's program director. The station derived much of its programming from the Blue Network but also aired local music programs daily plus blocks of local religious programming on Sundays. By 1945, Lorene Wood was named program director and the station added programming from the Keystone Broadcasting System. The next year, with the sale of the Blue Network, WGRM switched affiliations to remain with NBC and Shelton Morgan became the program director. By the end of the 1940s, Grace Harris took over the program director role.

=== Blues history ===
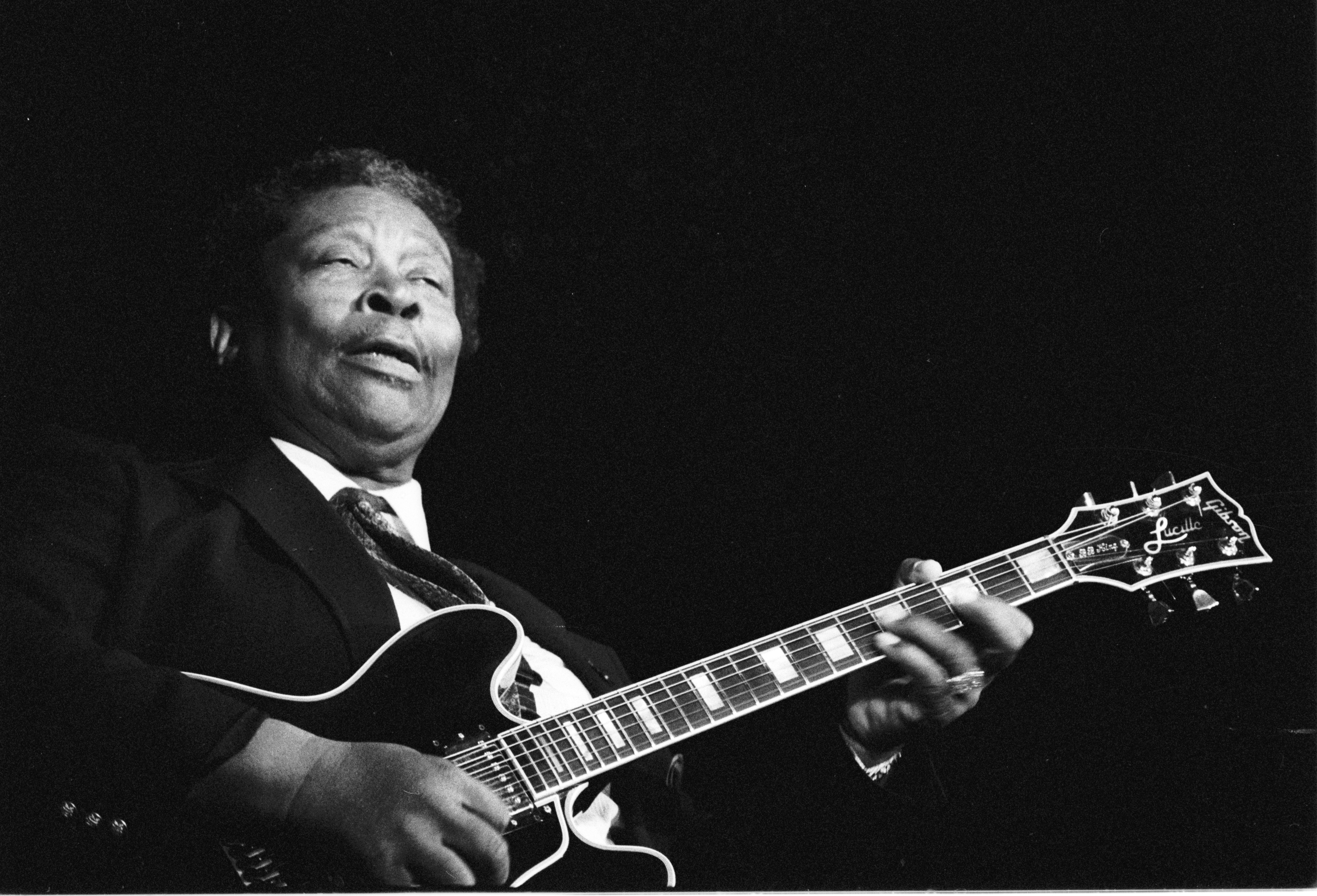
B.B. King performing in France in 1989

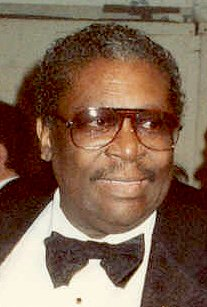
B.B. King in 1990

In the early twentieth century, the voices of African Americans were rarely heard on the radio in the Southern United States. A notable exception to this rule was live broadcasts of gospel music. In the 1940s, WGRM aired live performances by gospel groups on Sunday afternoons, including the Famous St. John's Quartet of Inverness, Mississippi. Some sources place the first appearance of the quartet on WGRM in 1940 and some in 1943, but all agree that the group featured young Riley King on guitar in his broadcast debut. After several years, Riley King moved to Memphis where he took on the nickname "Beale Street Blues Boy" which was in turn shortened to B.B. King. In the early 1950s, pianist Bobby Hines, bluesman Matt Cockrell, and L.C. "Lonnie the Cat" Cation all recorded songs in these studios. The Mississippi Blues Commission has placed a historical marker at the (now former) WGRM studios and they were the third stop added to the Mississippi Blues Trail, highlighting locations critical in the development of blues music.

=== New studios ===
In 1950, the station relocated north of the Tallahatchie River to new studios at 600 Walnut Street. The station's programming remained steady through the early 1950s with Lew Sadler becoming program director by 1955. Later that year, however, station founder P.K. Ewing, Sr., died and his wife, Myrtle M. Ewing (listed initially as simply "Mrs. P.K. Ewing"), took both ownership and operational control of the station as executrix of his estate. By 1958, Myrtle Ewing had direct ownership of WGRM and named Ed Smith program director. By 1961, Myrtle Ewing had joined her late husband and control of WGRM passed to Fayette Ewing as the executor of her estate. In 1963, the station upgraded its daytime signal to 1,000 watts while maintaining a nighttime power of 250 watts.

Fayette Ewing retained his position as the station's general manager throughout the 1960s and into the late 1970s. By 1966 Clay Ewing was named WGRM's commercial manager. Thomas E. Ewing took on a variety of roles with the station in the late 1960s including promotions manager, program director, news director, and chief engineer at various times.

=== 1970s ===
In 1971, the station described its musical format as middle of the road" with some programming provided by the NBC Radio network. Clay Ewing was drawn away from the station for a few years when he was elected mayor of Greenwood, Mississippi, in 1973. He would serve in that role until 1977. In 1974, the ownership of the station and broadcast license were transferred from personal ownership by Fayette Ewing to a new company named Twelve-Forty, Inc., still wholly owned by him. By 1976, the station's format was reported as a mix of oldies music, country & western, and middle of the road with specialty blocks of farm news and classical music. At the same time, Clay Ewing began to assume some of the general manager duties for the station. In 1979, the music shifted back to just middle of the road, retaining the classic and farm specialty programs, and Thomas E. Ewing took on new responsibilities as president of the corporation.

After the death of Fayette Ewing, control of license holder Twelve-Forty, Inc., was passed involuntarily to his estate with his widow, Frances Groover Ewing, as executor. In May 1979, the FCC formally approved the transfer of control from the estate to Frances G. Ewing directly.

=== New generation ===
WGRM programming took a subtle shift to contemporary beautiful music in 1980 and dropped the classical music programs. The shift was short-lived as by 1982 the station's format was back to middle of the road. A more significant change took place in 1987 as the station went to "unlimited" 24-hour 1,000 watt broadcasting, maintaining the daytime power but quadrupling the station's power output at night. The station also made the move to a modern adult contemporary music format.

In 1988, Clay Ewing took sole custody of the general manager title in addition to his general sales manager role. The station also increased its farm programming to 12 hours per week. In November 1988, Frances G. Ewing applied to the FCC to voluntarily transfer control of Twelve-Forty, Inc., to Clay Ewing. The FCC accepted this application on December 1, 1988, approved the transfer on January 13, 1989, and the transaction was formally consummated on February 20, 1989.

In May 1989, as station ownership was working to put new sister station WGRM-FM on the air, WGRM applied to the FCC for a construction permit to simultaneously raise the height of its broadcast antenna and lower the wattage output of the transmitter. These changes would allow the station to share a single, taller broadcast tower with the new FM station and maintain its restricted broadcast coverage area. The FCC granted the permit on September 5, 1989, with an 18-month deadline expiring on March 5, 1991. In October 1990, the station notified the FCC that construction on the new tower was complete and the FCC granted WGRM a license to cover the changes on December 11, 1990.

=== Willis era ===
In December 1998, after six decades of Ewing-family ownership, Clay Ewing and Twelve-Forty, Inc., reached an agreement to sell WGRM and WGRM-FM to Willis Broadcasting Corporation, based in Norfolk, Virginia. Willis Broadcasting Corporation was wholly owned by Levi E. Willis, Sr. The FCC approved the deal on February 22, 1999, and the transaction was formally consummated on March 31, 1999.

When Willis Broadcasting Corporation acquired WGRM and WGRM-FM, it owned only one other radio station: WIZK in Bay Springs, Mississippi. Although it would later sell WIZK, by mid-2005 the company held the broadcast licenses for eight radio stations across Louisiana and Mississippi. In July 2005, owner Levi Willis applied to the FCC to transfer the licenses for WGRM and WGRM-FM to a new company called Christian Broadcasting of Greenwood, Inc. These would be the only two stations held by this new company. The FCC swiftly approved the transfer on July 29, 2005, and the transaction was formally consummated on January 1, 2006.

Christian Broadcasting of Greenwood's sole shareholder, Levi E. Willis, Sr., died on February 20, 2009, at the age of 79. In March 2009, his estate notified the FCC of the involuntary transfer of control of the license holder. The FCC approved the transfer of control to the Estate of Levi E. Willis, Sr., with Joseph L. Lindsey as executor, on May 13, 2009.

On May 14, 2017, WGRM changed their format to top 40/CHR, branded as "Hot 1240". (info taken from stationintel.com)

The WGRM and WGRM-FM licenses were deleted on February 2, 2022.

== Former personalities ==
Past on-air personalities on WGRM include Rose Mathews Ewing, known as the "Weather Lady", who read weather forecasts on WGRM and WGRM-FM while her husband Clay Ewing owned the stations in the 1980s and 1990s. Rose Ewing died of heart failure in May 2006 at the age of 66. Clay Ewing died six months later on November 23, 2006, at the age of 67. In addition to his role with the radio stations, Clay Ewing served one term as mayor of Greenwood from 1973 to 1977.

== Awards and honors ==
In 2005, WGRM air personality Gwendolyn Riley was one of six nominees in the "Mississippi Gospel Radio Announcer of The Year" category at the 27th Annual Cingular Wireless Mississippi Gospel Music Awards. Riley began her WGRM career in 1991.

In December 2007, WGRM was announced as one of five nominees in the "Radio Station of the Year, Small Markets" category for the 2008 Stellar Gospel Music Awards. The awards ceremony was held January 12, 2008, at the Acuff Theater in Nashville, Tennessee.
