= KWYN (AM) =

- Wynne, Arkansas; United States
- Frequency: 1400 kHz
- Branding: K-Wynne Classic Country

Programming
- Format: Classic Country

Ownership
- Owner: East Arkansas Broadcasters, Inc.
- Sister stations: KWYN-FM

History
- First air date: 1956
- Call sign meaning: WYNne, Arkansas

Technical information
- Licensing authority: FCC
- Facility ID: 18183
- Class: C
- Power: 1,000 watts
- Transmitter coordinates: 35°15′22″N 90°47′48″W
- Translators: 102.9 K275BR (Wynne); 106.9 K295CT (Wynne)

Links
- Public license information: Public file; LMS
- Webcast: Listen Live
- Website: kwyn.com

KWYN (1400 AM) is a radio station licensed to Wynne, Arkansas. The station broadcasts a Classic Country format and is owned by East Arkansas Broadcasters, Inc. They offer traditional country music, live local sports programming, network news, and agricultural market reports.

== History ==
Since its launch on September 28, 1956, KWYN-AM 1400 has increased from 250 watts to 1,000 watts full-time. Raymond O. "Bud" and Hannah Raley, who were born and raised in Paragould, Arkansas, founded KWYN.

With its Yawn Patrol program, KWYN also boasts the longest-running discussion show in the Mid-South and has consistently ranked among the top AM stations in the country.

The office and studios of KWYN are located in Wynne, Arkansas.
