= KWYN-FM =

- Wynne, Arkansas; United States
- Broadcast area: Memphis, Tennessee; Forrest City, Arkansas
- Frequency: 92.5 MHz
- Branding: Country 92.5

Programming
- Format: Country

Ownership
- Owner: East Arkansas Broadcasters, Inc.
- Sister stations: KWYN

History
- First air date: 1969
- Call sign meaning: Wynne

Technical information
- Licensing authority: FCC
- Facility ID: 18182
- Class: C2
- ERP: 50,000 watts
- HAAT: 148 meters (486 ft)
- Transmitter coordinates: 35°01′43″N 90°32′31″W
- Translator: 100.1 K261EA (Marianna)

Links
- Public license information: Public file; LMS
- Website: kwyn.com

KWYN-FM (92.5 FM) is a radio station licensed to Wynne, Arkansas. The station broadcasts a country music format and is owned by East Arkansas Broadcasters, Inc.
