= KTHS (AM) =

- Green Forest, Arkansas; United States
- Frequency: 1480 kHz
- Branding: Your Spanish Radio

Programming
- Format: Regional Mexican

Ownership
- Owner: Carroll County Broadcasting

History
- First air date: 1958

Technical information
- Licensing authority: FCC
- Facility ID: 35668
- Class: D
- Power: 5,000 watts day 64 watts night
- Transmitter coordinates: 36°21′42″N 93°33′40″W
- Repeaters: 96.9 K245BJ (Berryville); 102.3 K272FX (Eureka Springs)

Links
- Public license information: Public file; LMS
- Website: kthsradio.com

KTHS (1480 AM, "Your Spanish Radio") is a radio station broadcasting a Regional Mexican format. Licensed to Green Forest, Arkansas, United States, the station is currently owned by Carroll County Broadcasting.

On August 2, 2011, KTHS changed their format from sports to bluegrass, branded as "96.9 The Mountain" (also broadcasts on FM translator K245BJ 96.9 FM).

On February 19, 2013, KTHS changed their format to classic hits, branded as "96.9 The Legend".

On October 22, 2013, the station's city of license was changed from Berryville, Arkansas to Green Forest.
