= KRZS (FM) =

- Pangburn, Arkansas; United States
- Broadcast area: Searcy, Arkansas
- Frequency: 99.1 MHz
- Branding: 99.1 The Hawg

Programming
- Format: Classic rock

Ownership
- Owner: Crain Media Group, LLC

History
- First air date: 2002 (as KSMD)
- Former call signs: KSMD (2002–2015)

Technical information
- Licensing authority: FCC
- Facility ID: 87603
- Class: C3
- ERP: 25,000 watts
- HAAT: 100 meters (330 ft)
- Transmitter coordinates: 35°23′43″N 91°44′17″W

Links
- Public license information: Public file; LMS

KRZS (99.1 FM, "The Hawg") is a radio station broadcasting a classic rock music format. Licensed to Pangburn, Arkansas, United States, the station is currently owned by Crain Media Group, LLC.

== History ==
On December 25, 2015, KRZS changed their format from classic country (branded as "99.1 The Stallion") to classic rock, branded as "99.1 The Hawg".
