= Eyesight to the Blind =

Single by Sonny Boy Williamson II
- B-side: "Crazy 'Bout You, Baby"
- Released: 1951
- Recorded: January 4, 1951 (version 1); March 12, 1951 (versions 2 & 3)
- Genre: Blues
- Length: 3:04
- Label: Trumpet
- Songwriter: Sonny Boy Williamson II
- Producer: Lillian McMurry

Sonny Boy Williamson II singles chronology
"Cool, Cool Blues" (1951)	"Eyesight to the Blind" (1951)	"Pontiac Blues" (1951)

"Eyesight to the Blind" is a 12-bar blues song written and recorded in 1951 by American harmonica player Sonny Boy Williamson II (Aleck "Rice" Miller). He also recorded the related songs "Born Blind", "Unseeing Eye", "Don't Lose Your Eye", and "Unseen Eye" during his career. The Larks, an American rhythm and blues group, recorded the song, which reached number five on the R&B charts in 1951. Several musicians subsequently recorded it in a variety of styles. The Who adapted Williamson's song for their rock opera Tommy.

In 2022, Williamson's recording was inducted into the Blues Hall of Fame in the 'Classics of Blues Recording – Singles' category.

== Sonny Boy Williamson versions ==
The song was recorded by Sonny Boy Williamson in 1951 as his first single release on Trumpet Records. Three versions of the song were released as 78 rpm singles. The first version featured Sonny Boy Williamson II on vocals and harmonica, Willie Love on piano, Joe Willie Wilkins on guitar, Elmore James on guitar, and Joe Dyson on drums; the second and third versions had Sonny Boy Williamson II, Willie Love, Henry Reed on double bass, and Joe Dyson.

In 1957, Sonny Boy Williamson re-recorded the song for Checker Records with the title "Born Blind". Accompanying him were Otis Spann on piano, Robert Lockwood and Luther Tucker on guitars, Willie Dixon on bass, and Fred Below on drums.

== Renditions by other artists ==
The most successful early version was that by the Larks, originally a vocal group which had developed out of gospel group, the Selah Jubilee Singers. The group's recording of "Eyesight to the Blind", with vocals and guitar by Allen Bunn, who later worked solo as Tarheel Slim, reached number five on the Billboard R&B charts in July 1951.

Mose Allison recorded the song for his 1959 album Autumn Song. Unlike Williamson's original, he performs it as a "swinging, up-tempo jump number". As a popular piece, it is included on several of his anthologies, such as Allison Wonderland Anthology (1994).

The Who adapted the song for the 1969 rock opera album Tommy. Roger Daltrey sings Williamson's song set to new accompaniment composed by Pete Townshend. It appears as the last track on the first side of the album; the original Track Records album cover uses the title "The Hawker", while on the record label it is listed as "Eyesight to the Blind". "Eyesight to the Blind (The Hawker)" or "The Hawker (Eyesight to the Blind)" is often found on later releases. The album credits for the song read "Sonny Boy Williamson".

For the 1972 Tommy orchestral performance, Richie Havens sang the vocals on the song, backed by the London Symphony Orchestra. In the 1975 film version of Tommy, Eric Clapton and Arthur Brown perform the piece. Several live performances by the Who are in release. It also appears on the Broadway cast album performed by Michael McElroy and featuring Lee Morgan on harmonica.

Other artists who recorded the song include:

- B.B. King – The Jungle (1967), also one Live in Japan (1971, released 1999)
- Buddy Rich – Big Band Machine (1975)
- Eric Clapton – Crossroads 2: Live in the Seventies (recorded 1975, released 1996)
- Mike Bloomfield – I'm with You Always (1977, released 2008)
- Jack-Knife – I Wish You Would (1979)
- Aerosmith – Honkin' On Bobo (2004)
- Gary Moore – Close as You Get (2007)
- The Smithereens – The Smithereens Play Tommy (2009)
- David Bromberg – The Blues, the Whole Blues, and Nothing But the Blues (2016)
