= Lillian McMurry =

American record producer (1921–1999)

Lillian Shedd McMurry (December 30, 1921 – March 18, 1999) was one of the earliest American female record producers and owner of Trumpet Records. She was influential in the development of blues music, particularly through her recordings of Sonny Boy Williamson II and her discovery of the guitarist Elmore James.

== Biography ==
Lillian Shedd was born in Purvis, Mississippi. During the Great Depression, Lillian's family experienced extreme poverty. They were too poor to buy schoolbooks which were not provided by the school. At age 13, she worked part-time after school. In the early 1940s, she worked the counter at a pharmacy working from 7 am to 10 pm, seven days a week. She later earned a promotion to manager.

She married furniture-store owner Willard McMurry in 1945. They met when Lillian found a piano in his furniture store and was interested in selling her old piano. They settled in Jackson, Mississippi. In 1949, she was helping her husband clear out a shop he had bought (a hardware store located at 309 Farish Street that was being converted to a furniture store). Workers came upon a pile of old shellac 78 rpm phonograph discs. The workers were playing records and Lillian was so inspired by hearing Wynonie Harris' "All She Wants to Do Is Rock" she wanted to sell records. The furniture store sold the stock they discovered and she also decided to record more music like it. By her own account, until that point she, as a white woman, had been completely unaware of the music being made on her doorstep by her African-American neighbors. She said: "It was the most unusual, sincere and solid sound I'd ever heard. I'd never heard a black record before. I'd never heard anything with such rhythm and freedom."

=== 1950–1952 ===
She turned part of the furniture store into her own music store, Record Mart, in Jackson, and in 1950 established Trumpet Records and its parent company, Diamond Record Company. The first releases were of gospel music, but she soon auditioned and recorded both slide guitarist Elmore James, on his original recording of "Dust My Broom", and Sonny Boy Williamson II (Aleck "Rice" Miller). Initially, McMurry apparently thought that "Williamson" was the original musician of that name.

Many of the sides he first recorded for Trumpet, such as "Eyesight to the Blind" and "Nine Below Zero", later became blues standards. His song "Pontiac Blues" was a tribute to McMurry's car. McMurry was also credited with writing some of his songs, including "Red Hot Kisses." Elmore James did not realise that his performance of "Dust My Broom" was being recorded, and after he found out, he refused to record for McMurry again, although the recording made him well known.

Among the other musicians recorded by McMurry were Big Joe Williams, Willie Love, Clayton Love, Arthur "Big Boy" Crudup, and Jerry McCain. She acted as producer on many of the sessions recorded for Trumpet, and hired top musicians including B.B. King, Little Milton Campbell and Joe Willie Wilkins to play on them. She was also noted for refusing to adhere to the Jackson musicians union's segregationist requirements, and the sessions freely mixed black and white musicians.

Lillian McMurry later said, “There were some adverse reactions of the white people because they couldn't understand why a white lady would be recording black music, even though nearly all the white citizens would go to hear and dance to black bands at a local Club, The Rotisserie. Frankly, at that time, few people had any idea of what making records entailed, and hardly any had ever been in or seen a recording studio, much less knew about producing phonorecords. I think the white people could have understood better if I'd just been recording hillbilly or white pop music. Because we recorded some black blues and spirituals, I was treated rather ugly sometimes by certain people… I acted as a lady, as a businessperson, and that's the way it should have been.”

=== 1953–1956 ===
In the summer of 1953, Lillian's dad built the Diamond Recording Studio (DRC), designed by Bill Holford of ACA, and the Record Mart ceased operations. Lillian took what she learned from being in sessions with great engineers such as Holford and engineered sessions herself. She was only one of a handful of known female engineers in the US at that time.

The label faced a number of struggles - unfaithful artists, the failure to find new artists that could grab hold of the market, distributors that got merchandise then went bankrupt, and others that ignored invoices completely. Trumpet ceased in 1955 but she tried to continue the business under a new label Globe Music (which included Trumpet releases). The last recording at the DRC was Lucky Joe Almond on St. Patrick's Day in 1956.

=== 1957–2007 ===
McMurry went back to working in her husband's shop, while scrupulously continuing to pay the musicians' royalties and going after record labels that were trying to re-release Trumpet tracks without permission. In 1965, she paid for Sonny Boy Williamson's tombstone in Tutwiler, Mississippi. In 1998, she was inducted into the Blues Hall of Fame, one of the few record producers to be granted that honour. She died in Jackson from a heart attack at the age of 77 in March 1999.

On November 17, 2007, Lillian and Willard McMurry (who died in 1996) were posthumously honored with a historical marker on their former recording studio in Jackson, Mississippi. Her daughter, Vitrice, her son-in-law, and her granddaughter attended along with Dr. Woody Sistrunk and Trumpet musician Jerry McCain. The McMurry family was awarded a plaque to go along with the historical marker.
