= Houston Boines =

American blues singer and harmonica player (1918–1970)

- Also known as: Houston Baines; Huston Boines
- Born: December 30, 1918; Hazlehurst, Mississippi, U.S.
- Died: November 8, 1970 (aged 51) Jackson, Mississippi, U.S.
- Genres: R&B; Memphis blues; delta blues
- Occupations: Pianist, singer, songwriter
- Instrument: Harmonica
- Labels: RPM; Rhythm & Blues; Sun

Houston Boines (December 30, 1918 – November 8, 1970) was an American blues singer and harmonica player. Boines, accompanied by guitarist Charley Booker, was recruited by talent scout Ike Turner to record for Modern Records in 1952. He also recorded for Sun Records in 1953.

== Biography ==
Boines was born in Hazlehurst, Mississippi, on December 30, 1918. He was still living in Hazelhurst when he enlisted in the United States Army in January 1941, before the United States entered World War II. After his service, he played with guitarists Charley Booker, Houston Stackhouse, and Eddie Cusic.

In 1952, musician and talent scout Ike Turner brought Boines to record for the Biharis Brothers at Modern. Boines signed to their subsidiary Blues & Rhythm Records. Turner accompanied Boines on piano during the session in Greenville, Mississippi, in January 1952. He also backed Charley Booker on a few tracks during that session. Boines' record ''Going Home'' / ''Relation Blues'' was released on Blues & Rhythm. The single "Superintendent Blues" / "Monkey Motion" was released on Modern's subsidiary RPM Records in August 1952.

Boines met guitarist Little Milton in Leland, Mississippi. Milton brought Boines to record for Sam Phillips at Sun Records in Memphis, Tennessee. During a session in December 1953, backed by Milton on guitar and Ike Turner on piano, Boines recorded two tracks, including "Carry My Business On." They remained unissued until the latter appeared on the compilation Sun: The Roots Of Rock: Volume 2: Sam's Blues in 1976.

Boines broadcast on the radio program King Biscuit Time on KFFA in Helena, Arkansas. Houston Stackhouse, recalled that Boines was still playing in local clubs later in life, ''but he just faded on out. He'd drink so much." Death records in Mississippi reveal that a man named therein as Huston Boines died on November 8, 1970, in Jackson; it is presumed to be Houston Boines. Stackhouse also confirmed that Boines died around that time.

== Discography ==
=== Singles ===
- 1952: "Superintendent Blues" / "Monkey Motion" (RPM 364)
- 1952: "Going Home" / "Relation Blues" (Blues & Rhythm 7001)

=== Album appearances ===
- 1976: Howlin' Wolf, Little Milton, Houston Boines – Sun: The Roots Of Rock: Volume 2: Sam's Blues (Charly)
- 2003: The Modern Downhome Blues Sessions, Volume 2: Mississippi & Arkansas 1952 (Ace)
- 2010: Ike Turner – That Kat Sure Could Play! The Singles 1951 to 1957 (Secret Records Limited)
