= Joe Willie Wilkins =

American blues guitarist, singer and songwriter (c. 1921–1979)

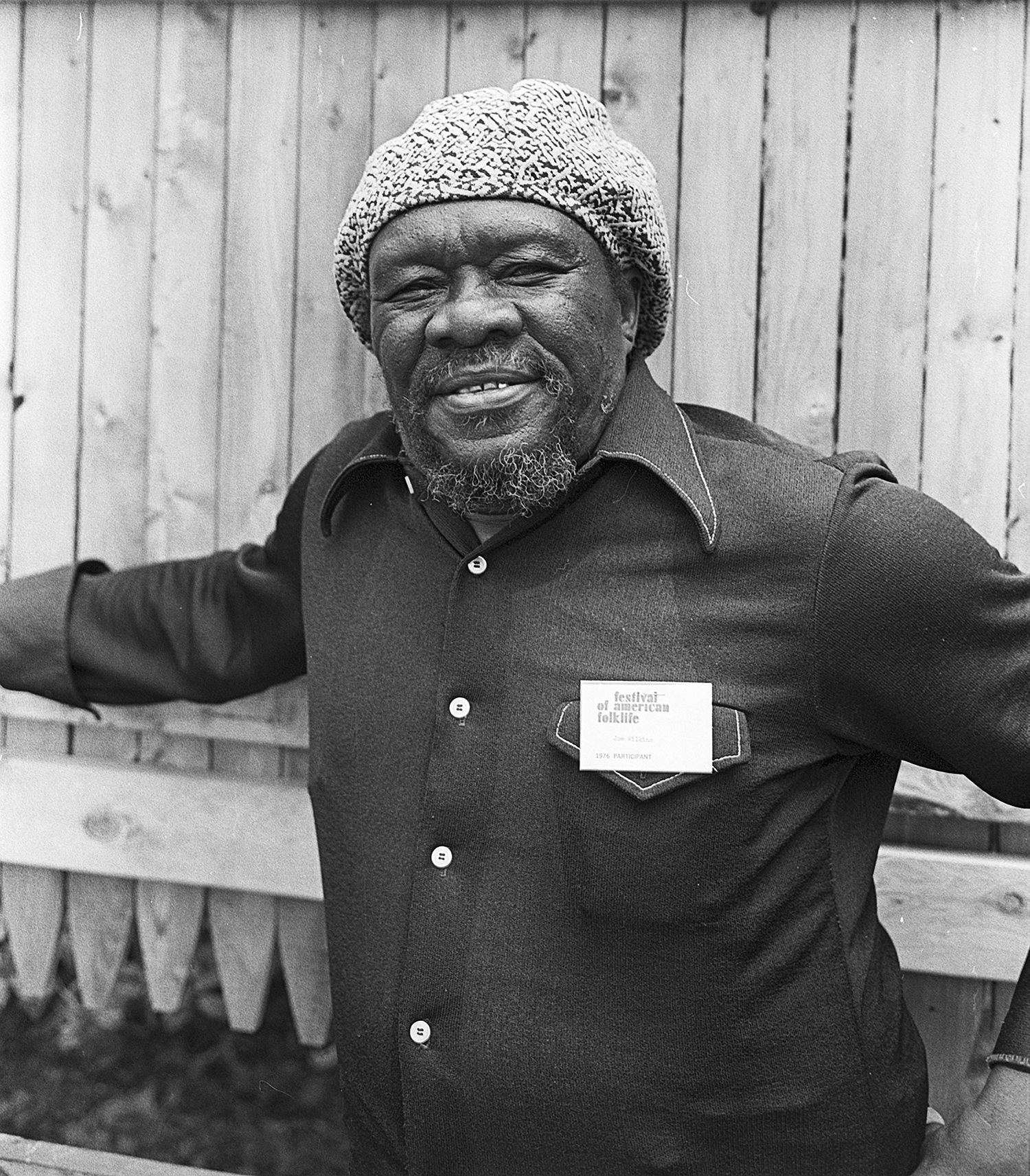
- Joe Willie Wilkins, Smithsonian Folklife Festival, 1976.

Background information
- Born: January 7, 1921 or 1923; Davenport, Coahoma County, Mississippi, United States
- Died: March 28, 1979 (age 56 or 58) Memphis, Tennessee, United States
- Genres: Memphis blues
- Occupations: Guitarist, singer, songwriter, musician
- Instruments: Guitar, vocals
- Years active: 1941–1979
- Label: Various

Joe Willie Wilkins (January 7, 1921 or 1923 – March 28, 1979) was an American Memphis blues guitarist, singer and songwriter. He influenced his contemporaries Houston Stackhouse, Robert Nighthawk, David Honeyboy Edwards, and Jimmy Rogers, but he had a greater impact on up-and-coming guitarists, including Little Milton, B.B. King, and Albert King. Wilkins's songs include "Hard Headed Woman" and "It's Too Bad."

== Biography ==
Wilkins was born in Davenport, Coahoma County, Mississippi. He grew up on a plantation near Bobo, Mississippi. His father, Papa Frank Wilkins, a sharecropper and guitarist, was a friend of the country bluesman Charley Patton. Young Wilkins learned to play the guitar, harmonica and accordion. His early proficiency on the guitar and devotion to learning from records earned him the nickname Walking Seeburg (the Seeburg Corporation was an early manufacturer of jukeboxes).

Wilkins became a well-known musician in the Mississippi Delta, and by the early 1940s he took over from Robert Lockwood, Jr. in Sonny Boy Williamson II's band. In 1941, Wilkins relocated to Helena, Arkansas, and joined both Williamson and Lockwood on KFFA Radio's King Biscuit Time. Through the 1940s Wilkins was broadcast regularly, playing alongside Williamson, Willie Love, Robert Nighthawk, Elmore James, Memphis Slim, Houston Stackhouse and Howlin' Wolf. He played the guitar on several recordings by Williamson and by Love, and he played the bass accompanying Big Joe Williams.

To Muddy Waters, Wilkins was the first guitarist from the Delta who played single-string guitar riffs without a slide. Later on, Waters stated, "The man is great, the man is stone great. For blues, like I say, he's the best."

Wilkins formed the Three Aces with Willie Nix and Love in 1950 and rejoined Williamson at radio station KWEM, as a result of which he became a member of the studio band at Sun Records. He was also a session musician for Trumpet Records, recording with Williamson, Love, Nix, Arthur "Big Boy" Crudup, Roosevelt Sykes, Big Walter Horton, Little Walter, Mose Vinson, Joe Hill Louis, Elmore James, and Floyd Jones.

Charley Booker's final recording was as a guest with Wilkins at a 1973 blues festival at Notre Dame, in South Bend, Indiana. The same year, Mimosa Records released a single of Wilkins's debut vocal performance. Adamo Records later issued a live album of some of his concert performances.

His working relationship and friendship with Houston Stackhouse endured over the years, with Stackhouse at one time living in the same premises as Wilkins and his wife. Wilkins and Stackhouse played at various blues music festivals and were part of the traveling Memphis Blues Caravan. After undergoing a colostomy in the late 1970s, Wilkins continued to perform.

Wilkins is buried in the Galilee Memorial Gardens, near Memphis, Tennessee. The Killer Blues Headstone Project placed a headstone for Wilkins in 2021.

== Confusion over dates ==
There is some confusion over Wilkins's date of birth and date of death; various sources quote 1921, 1922 or 1923 as the year of his birth, and some cite 1981 for his death. AllMusic erroneously stated that "his final performances were an East Coast tour in 1981 and that he died in the week following these engagements".

== Songwriting ==
Song title	Recorded by
"Hard Headed Woman"	Various artists, Memphis Blues Caravan – Vol. 2
"Leave Me Alone"	P. J. Colt

== See also ==
- List of Memphis blues musicians
