= KFFA =

KFFA may refer to:

- KFFA (AM), a radio station (1360 AM) licensed to Helena, Arkansas, United States
- KFFA-FM, a radio station (103.1 FM) licensed to Helena, Arkansas, United States
- the ICAO code for First Flight Airport
