= Johnny Dollar =

Johnny Dollar may refer to:

- Yours Truly, Johnny Dollar, a radio drama
- Johnny Dollar (musician) (1933–1986), American country and rockabilly musician
- Johnny Dollar (blues musician) (1941–2006), American Chicago blues guitarist, singer and songwriter
- Jonny Dollar (1964–2009), English record producer and songwriter
