= List of bass instruments =

Musical instruments that play in the bass range

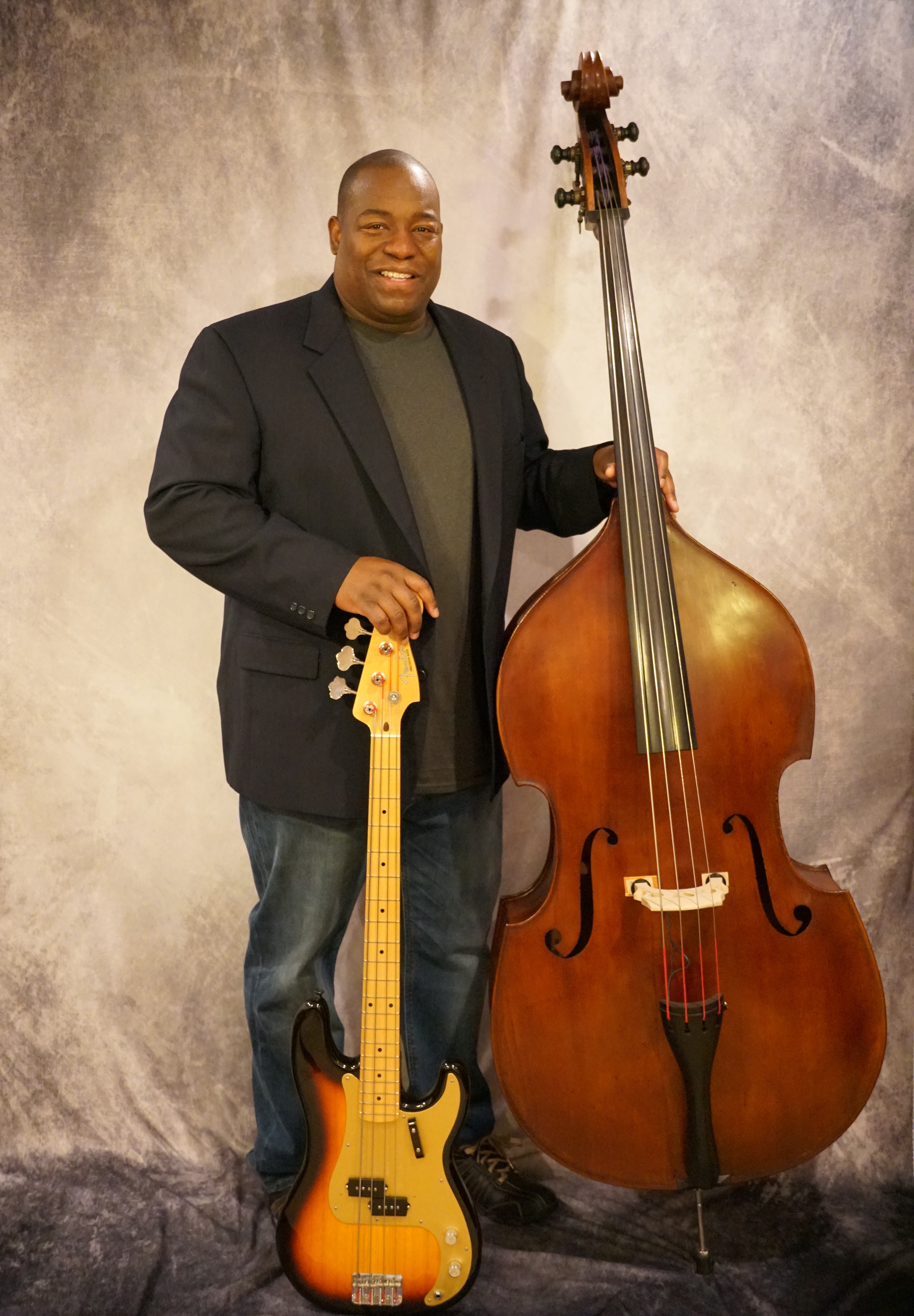
Alex Dixon holding a bass guitar and double bass

Bass instruments are musical instruments that produce tones in the low-frequency range. They are found across many musical families, including strings, brass, woodwinds, keyboards, and percussion.

== String instruments ==
- Double bass
- Bass guitar
- Contrabass guitar
- Bass violin
- Cello
- Viola da gamba
- Octobass
- Violone
- Bass banjo
- Bass ukulele
- Bass koto
- Barbiton
- Bass balalaika
- Contrabass balalaika

== Brass instruments ==
- Tuba
- Sousaphone
- Bass trombone
- Contrabass trombone
- Ophicleide
- Serpent
- Bass trumpet
- Bass horn

== Woodwind instruments ==
- Bassoon
- Contrabassoon
- Bass clarinet
- Contrabass clarinet
- Bass flute
- Contrabass flute
- Bass saxophone
- Contrabass saxophone
- Bass recorder
- Great bass recorder
- Subcontrabass flute
- Subcontrabass saxophone

== Keyboard instruments ==
- Piano (bass registers)
- Pipe organ (pedal division)
- Electric organ (bass registers)
- Synthesizer (bass patches)
- Bass pedalboard

== Percussion instruments ==
- Bass drum
- Timpani (lower ranges)
- Taiko (larger drums)
- Octobans (lower-pitched varieties)

== Other ==
- Didgeridoo
- Bass harmonica
- Jew's harp (in lower tunings)
- Marimbula
- Jug
- Washtub bass

== See also ==
- Bass (sound)
- Bassline
- List of musical instruments
