= Houston Stackhouse =

American blues guitarist and singer (1910–1980)

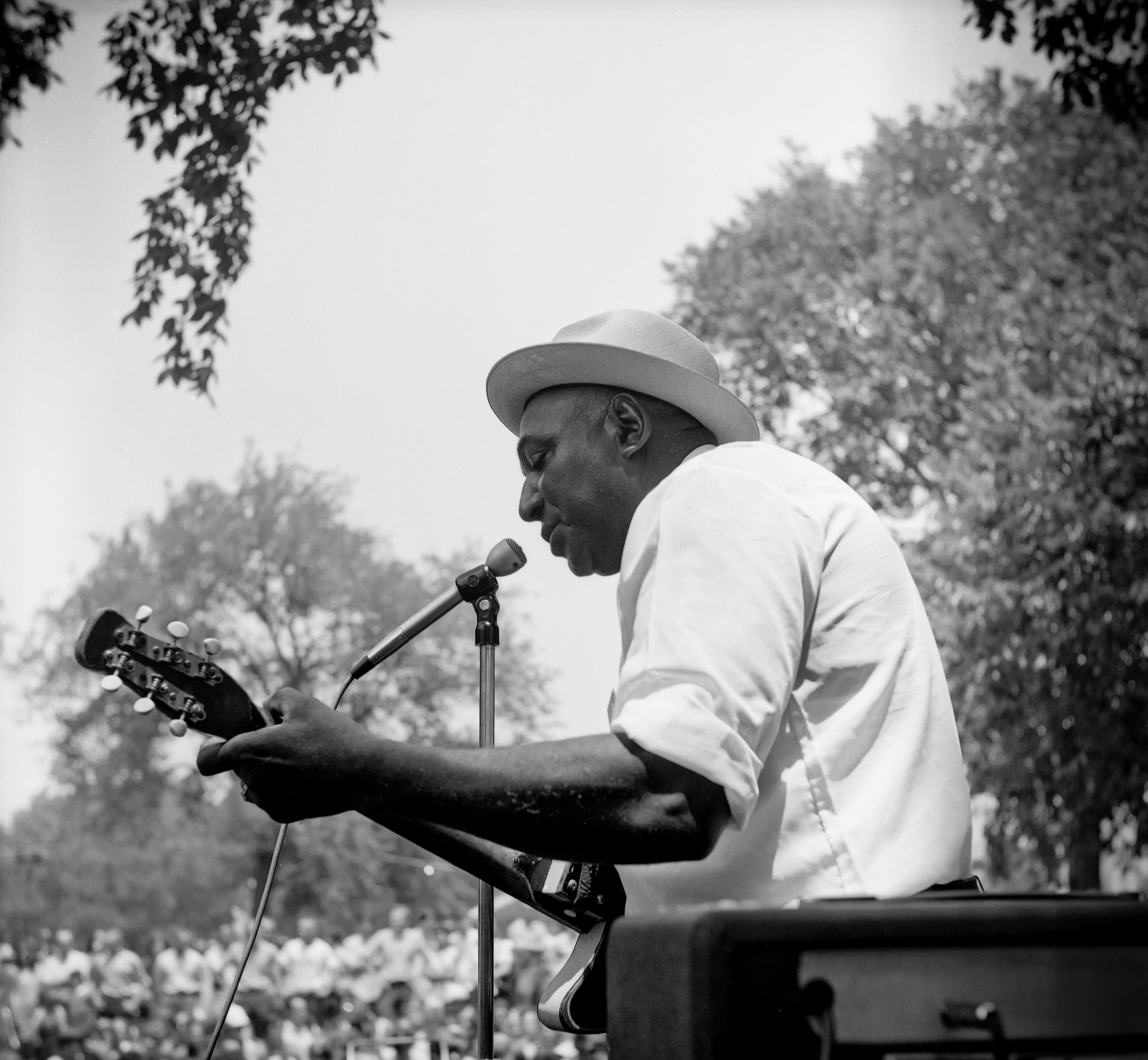
- Stackhouse in 1970

Background information
- Born: Houston Goff; September 28, 1910; Wesson, Mississippi, U.S.
- Died: September 23, 1980 (aged 69) Helena, Arkansas, U.S.
- Genres: Delta blues; country blues
- Occupations: Musician; songwriter
- Instruments: Guitar; vocals; harmonica
- Years active: Mid-1930s–late 1970s

Houston Goff (September 28, 1910 – September 23, 1980), known as Houston Stackhouse, was an American Delta blues guitarist and singer. He is best known for his association with Robert Nighthawk. He was not especially noted as a guitarist or singer, but Nighthawk showed gratitude to Stackhouse, his guitar teacher, by backing him on a number of recordings in the late 1960s. Apart from a brief tour in Europe, Stackhouse confined his performing to the area around the Mississippi Delta.

== Biography ==
Stackhouse was born Houston Goff in Wesson, Mississippi, United States. He was the son of Garfield Goff and was raised by James Wade Stackhouse on the Randall Ford Plantation. He learned the details of his parentage only when he applied for a passport later in life.

In his teenage years he relocated with his family to Crystal Springs, Mississippi. He became inspired listening to local musicians and records by Blind Blake, Blind Lemon Jefferson and Lonnie Johnson. By the late 1930s, Stackhouse had played guitar around the Delta states and worked with members of the Mississippi Sheiks, Robert Johnson, Charlie McCoy and Walter Vinson. He also teamed up with his distant cousin Robert Nighthawk, whom he taught to play the guitar. Originally a fan of Tommy Johnson, Stackhouse often covered his songs. In 1946, Stackhouse moved to Helena, Arkansas, to live near Nighthawk and for a time was a member of Nighthawk’s band, playing on KFFA radio.

He split from Nighthawk in 1947 and performed on the KFFA radio program King Biscuit Time, with the drummer James "Peck" Curtis, the guitarist Joe Willie Wilkins and the pianists Pinetop Perkins and Robert Traylor. Sonny Boy Williamson II then rejoined the program, and that combo performed across the Delta, using their radio presence to advertise their performances.

Stackhouse tutored Jimmy Rogers and Sammy Lawhorn in guitar techniques. Between 1948 and 1954, he worked during the day at the Chrysler plant in West Helena, Arkansas, and played the blues in his leisure time. He did not move from the South, unlike many of his contemporaries, and continued to perform locally into the 1960s with Frank Frost, Boyd Gilmore and Baby Face Turner. In May 1965, Sonny Boy Williamson II, who was by then back on King Biscuit Time, used Stackhouse as an accompanist when he was recorded in concert by Chris Strachwitz of Arhoolie Records. The recording, entitled King Biscuit Time, was issued under Williamson's name. Shortly afterwards, Williamson died. Stackhouse continued briefly on the radio program, back in tandem with Nighthawk.

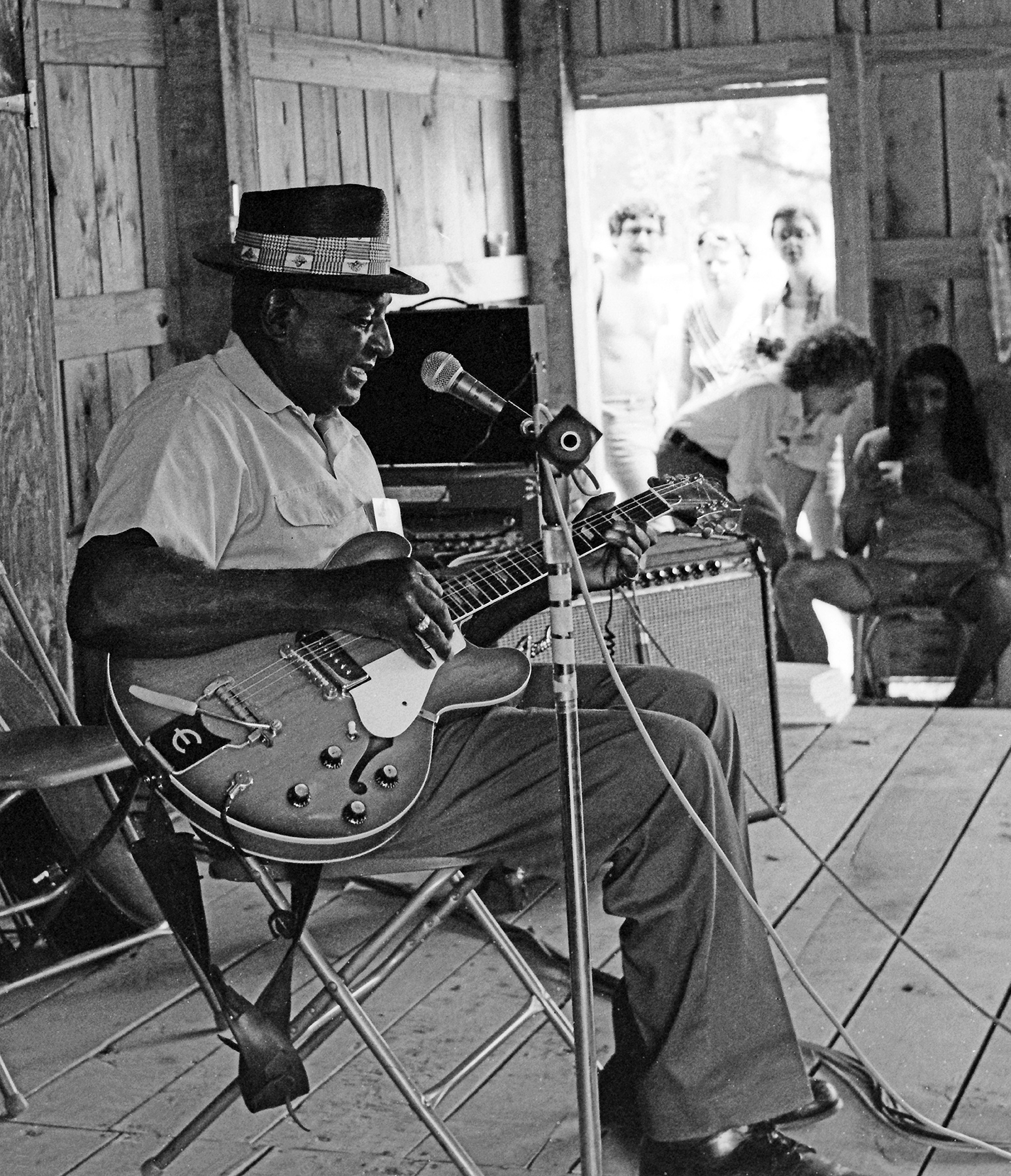
Houston Stackhouse at the 1976 Smithsonian Festival.

In 1967, George Mitchell recorded Stackhouse, Curtis and Nighthawk as the Blues Rhythm Boys in Dundee, Mississippi Nighthawk died shortly after the recording was made. Another field researcher, David Evans, recorded Stackhouse in Crystal Springs. By 1970, following the deaths of Curtis and Mason, Stackhouse had moved to Memphis, Tennessee, where he resided with his old friend Wilkins and his wife, Carrie. At the height of the blues revival Stackhouse toured with Wilkins and with the Memphis Blues Caravan and performed at various music festivals.

In February 1972, Stackhouse recorded the album Cryin' Won't Help You (released on CD in 1994). In his sole trip overseas, in 1976, he performed in Vienna, Austria.

Stackhouse returned to Helena, where he died in September 1980, at the age of 69. A son, Houston Stackhouse, Jr., survived him.

The acoustic stage at the annual Arkansas Blues and Heritage Festival is named after Stackhouse.

In 2025 the Killer Blues Headstone Project placed the headstone for Houston Stackhouse at the Community Cemetery in Crystal Springs, Mississippi.

== Discography ==
=== Albums ===
- Cryin' Won't Help You (1972, reissued 1994), Genes Records

=== Compilation albums ===
- Masters of Modern Blues Volume 4: Robert Nighthawk and Houston Stackhouse (1967, reissued 1994), Testament Records
- Big Road Blues (1999), Wolf Records

== See also ==
- List of Delta blues musicians
- KWAM § Early years
