= "Sunshine" Sonny Payne =

American radio host (1925–2018)

- Born: John William Payne; November 29, 1925; Helena, Arkansas, U.S.
- Died: February 10, 2018 (aged 92); Wynne, Arkansas, U.S.
- Presenting career
- Show: King Biscuit Time
- Station: KFFA (AM)
- Time slot: Weekdays, 12:15 PM - 12:45 PM
- Country: United States
- Website: http://www.kingbiscuittime.com/

John William Payne (November 29, 1925 – February 10, 2018), better known as "Sunshine" Sonny Payne, was an American radio host, who had presented blues music as the host of the King Biscuit Time radio show on KFFA in Helena, Arkansas from 1951 until his death. In 2010 he was nominated for induction into the Blues Hall of Fame.

== Life and career ==
John William Payne was born in Helena, the son of Gladys Swope Payne and William G. Payne. In 1940 he began working as a paper boy, and met and became friends with blues musicians Robert Lockwood, Jr. and Sonny Boy Williamson. He applied for work at radio station KFFA when it began operating in 1941, and started as a janitor and errand boy at the station two days before broadcasts began. In 1942, in the absence of the station's owner and announcer Sam Anderson, he also began reading commercials on the station's 15-minute slot sponsored by the King Biscuit Flour company, and began learning to play bass. Later that year, he lied about his age and joined the U.S. Army, going on to serve in the 75th Signal Battalion in the Aleutian Islands and New Guinea.

He left the armed forces in 1948 in San Antonio, Texas, and joined with guitarist friend Bud Davis to accompany Tex Ritter on tour. He worked as a bass player with Ritter, Harry James and others, touring and working in Chicago until 1951, when he returned to Helena and secured a job as an announcer at KFFA. That year, he began working as host of the King Biscuit Time show. By the time he began regular broadcasting, the show had already won a wide audience as a hugely influential medium for blues in the Delta at a time when little African-American music was heard on the air. Initially, blues musicians such as Sonny Boy Williamson mainly played live in the studio, and later the program switched primarily to playing records. The show's reputation grew over the years to international proportions, enhanced by Sonny Payne's off-the-cuff patter. He gained the nickname "Sunshine" after a grumpy on-air comment about the weather, when taking part one day in a live outside broadcast, was taken up as a running joke by Robert Lockwood Jr. It is currently broadcast from the KFFA studio located in the Delta Cultural Center in Helena. Payne died on February 10, 2018, at the age of 92, having suffered a stroke sometime recently.

== Awards ==
Payne received the George Foster Peabody Award in 1992, for outstanding achievement in the field of radio and broadcast journalism. and twice received the Blues Foundation's Keeping the Blues Alive award. He was inducted into the Blues Foundation's Hall of Fame on May 5, 2010.
