= Bummer Road =

Compilation album by Sonny Boy Williamson II
- Released: 1969
- Studio: Chess
- Genre: Blues
- Label: Chess
- Producer: Leonard Chess

Sonny Boy Williamson II chronology
| Don't Send Me No Flowers (1968) | Bummer Road (1969) | Sonny Boy Williamson + Animals (1972) |

Bummer Road is a compilation album by the American blues musician Sonny Boy Williamson II, released in 1969. It achieved notoriety due to the inclusion of 11 minutes of studio outtakes related to the track "Little Village", where Williamson and producer Leonard Chess argue about the song. The album was issued with a label advising that the track was not suitable for airplay, due to profanity—allegedly, it is the first blues album to carry any kind of "explicit lyrics" sticker. "Little Village" inspired the name of Little Village, a band that included Ry Cooder, Jim Keltner, Nick Lowe, and John Hiatt.

== Production ==
"Little Village" was recorded in September 1957, at the Chess Records studio in Chicago. The songs on Bummer Road were produced by Leonard Chess; the album was compiled by T.T. Swan.

== Critical reception ==
Professional ratings
Review scores
| Source | Rating |
|---|---|
| AllMusic | 4.5/5 stars |
| The Encyclopedia of Popular Music | 3/5 stars |
| The New Rolling Stone Record Guide | 4/5 stars |

AllMusic wrote that "every track is a burner," and called the 11-minute "Little Village" studio chatter addition "one of the best examples of enlarging the scope of a musical track by adding auxiliary material that wasn't originally meant for release." Reviewing a reissue, The Age wrote: "The stunning 'Unseen Eye' ventures low-down through understated piano and guitar arpeggios, while the haunting 'Keep Your Hand Out of My Pocket' follows Sonny Boy's admonition: 'You'd better cut it now because if you let it cool, goddam it! It won't be worth a damn!'" The Anchorage Daily News called "Santa Claus" a "sweet and lazy harp blues from a master, backed up by Robert Jr. Lockwood's guitar, and allegedly made up on the studio spot when Sonny Boy was drunk."

== Track listing ==
| No. | Title | Length |
|---|---|---|
| 1. | "She Got Next to Me" | 2:30 |
| 2. | "Santa Claus" | 2:42 |
| 3. | "Little Village" | 11:50 |
| 4. | "Lonesome Cabin" | 3:00 |
| 5. | "I Can't Do Without You" | 2:45 |
| 6. | "Temperature 110" | 2:14 |
| 7. | "Unseen Eye" | 3:00 |
| 8. | "Keep Your Hand Out of My Pocket" | 2:45 |
| 9. | "Open Road" | 2:52 |
| 10. | "This Old Life" | 2:34 |
