= The Post War Blues =

Record label

The Post War Blues was a record label set up in 1965 by Mike Rowe. It specialized in reissuing obscure post war blues recordings on LP samplers.

The label has been one of the first to systematically put out compilations of recordings by more or less known post war blues artists, such as Big Walter Horton, Joe Hill Louis, Willie Love, Levi Seabury, Charley Booker, Harmonica Frank, Junior Brooks, Driftin' Slim, Luther Huff, Boyd Gilmore, Dan Pickett, Doug Quattlebaum, Skoodle Dum Doo & Sheffield, Leroy Dallas, Carolina Slim, Curley Weaver, Julius King, Jesse Thomas, Alex Moore, Manny Nichols, Soldier Boy Houston, Buddy Chiles, Andy Thomas, Country Jim, Nat Terry, Harvey Hill & His String Band, L.C. Green, Henry Smith & His Blue Flames, Sylvester Cotton, Slim Pickens, Baby Boy Warren, Bobo Jenkins and Andrew Durham. While the so-called blues revival of the 1960s was going on, it helped gratify the needs of a growing number of white customers to hear those artists' work, without having to search for the rare 78 rpm records on which those recordings were originally released.

Blues scholar (and Blues & Rhythm co-editor) Keith Briggs in his 1986 Blues & Rhythm article on bootleg blues record labels had the following to say about The Post War Blues: "Post War Blues only produced five albums but they remain sought-after items to this day. They were 'Chicago', 'Memphis and the Delta', 'Detroit', 'East Coast States' and 'Texas'. Although just about every track on the Chicago album is now available elsewhere the other four all carry rare items otherwise unavailable on LP. 'Chicago' has a standard 'bootleg' sleeve and includes a booklet but from then on P.W.B. managed to produce laminated sleeves of professional quality each embellished with photographs and copious notes. The sound of these records is outstandingly good and all are worthy of attention." A few issues later Phil Turton - commenting on the Briggs article - added the following: "Mike Rowe's Post War Blues should always be given pride of place both as the start of it all and also as a series of well thought out records designed to give attention to artists and styles that the major companies were totally ignoring."

Label founder Mike Rowe is best known as contributor to Blues Unlimited and other blues magazines, writer of album liner notes, and author of Chicago Blues: The City and the Music (Da Capo Paperback), first published in 1973 as Chicago Breakdown, and still in print.

== Discography ==
- Chicago - The Post-war Blues Volume 1 (1965)
- Memphis ....On Down - The Post-war Blues Volume 2 (1966)
- Eastern and Gulf Coast States - The Post-war Blues Volume 3 (1966)
- Texas - The Post-war Blues Volume 4 (1968)
- Detroit - The Post-war Blues Volume 5 (1968)
- Hobos & Drifters (EP 1966)

Detailed liner notes to the albums were written by Paul Oliver, Charles Radcliffe and Mike Rowe.

== See also ==
- List of record labels
