= Jerry McCain =

American electric blues musician (1930–2012)

Background information
- Also known as: Jerry "Boogie" McCain
- Born: Jerry B. McCain; June 19, 1930 near Gadsden, Alabama, United States
- Died: March 28, 2012 (aged 81) Gadsden, Alabama, U.S.
- Genres: Blues
- Instruments: Harmonica, guitar, vocals
- Years active: 1940s–2000s
- Labels: Trumpet, Excello, OKeh, Jewel, Romulus, Ichiban

Jerry McCain (June 18, 1930 – March 28, 2012), often billed as Jerry "Boogie" McCain, was an American electric blues musician, best known as a harmonica player.

== Biography ==
Born near Gadsden, Alabama, United States, he was one of five children of a poor family. Many of his siblings also became involved in music, most notably his brother, Walter, who played drums on some early recordings. McCain picked up the harmonica from itinerant musicians "Chick" and "Shorty" who played at the local bars (and street corners) when he was young.

McCain was a fan of the music of Little Walter and met the artist when, in 1953, he traveled to Gadsden for a show. McCain's recording debut came via Trumpet Records the same year under the name "Boogie McCain", with his brother Walter on drums. The two tracks were "East of the Sun" and "Wine-O-Wine". After recruiting Christopher Collins, who would be with him throughout most of his career, he went on to the Excello label. During his years with Excello (1956–59) he developed his amplified harmonica style, and unusual blues lyrics. The Excello label period saw the release of such noted songs as "The Jig's Up", and "My Next Door Neighbor". His later recording for Rex Records "She's Tough" b/w "Steady" was an inspiration to The Fabulous Thunderbirds, and Kim Wilson duplicated McCain's harp work on their version.

McCain also released singles and albums for Columbia, under their Okeh Records record label (1962), and for the Shreveport-based Jewel label (1965–68). The complete collection of his Jewel recordings are available on a compilation album and, in recent years, several of his early recordings have been released on "retrospective" compilation CDs, including the Varese Vintage album, Good Stuff!. His longest recording partner, Ichiban, also released several compilations in 1990s, including Jerry McCain (Retrospectives) (ICH-1516).

In 1989, after a period spent performing and touring with lesser known bands, McCain signed with Ichiban, and released the albums: Blues 'n' Stuff, Struttin' My Stuff, Love Desperado, and I've Got the Blues All Over Me. During his time with Ichiban, McCain also released one record on the Jericho label, This Stuff Just Kills Me, which featured John Primer, Jimmie Vaughan, and Johnnie Johnson. This 1999 release, This Stuff Just Kills Me eventually appeared on the Music Maker label.

In 2002, Ichiban released an album called Jerry McCain (American Roots: Blues). McCain's abridged work was featured on track 8 of the Rhino Records Blues Masters, Volume Four: Harmonica Classics, with an almost lost recording of "Steady". McCain's inclusion in the Blues Master series, was alongside Little Walter, Jimmy Reed, Junior Wells, Howlin' Wolf, Snooky Pryor, and George "Harmonica" Smith.

The City of Gadsden honored McCain by including his own day at their annual Riverfest Event; a four-day music event. The addition of The Jerry McCain Broad Street Blues Bash rounded out the entertainment and allowed many local citizens to experience McCain. A commemorative CD, featuring some of McCain's music, was compiled for sale at the 1997 Riverfest Event. In 1996, McCain was selected by the Etowah Youth Orchestras as the most well-known musician from Gadsden. The EYO commissioned the composer Julius Williams to write a work for solo harmonica and orchestra, to be performed by McCain and the Etowah Youth Symphony Orchestra, as a part of the City of Gadsden's Sesquicentennial Celebration. "Concerto for Blues Harmonica and Orchestra" was premiered in November 1996, on the EYO's Fall Formal Concert at Wallace Hall, on the campus of Gadsden State Community College. McCain performed the solo harmonica part with the EYSO, under the direction of Michael R. Gagliardo. The "Concerto" was subsequently performed in Alice Tully Hall, at the Lincoln Center for the Performing Arts in New York City in June 1997, with McCain, the EYSO, and Julius Williams conducting.

== Discography ==
=== Albums ===
- 1973 : Jerry McCain (Romulus R-108)
- 1978 : Living Legend (Zeus S-1021)
- 1979 : Blues on the Move (Robox EQL-1912)
- 1979 : Choo Choo Rock (White Label WLP-9966) 1955 demo recordings for Excello
- 1980 : Black & Blues (Gas Company GAS-1001) reissued as Black Blues is Back in 1989
- 1981 : Southern Harp, Cadillac & the Blues (P-Vine [Japan] PLP-715)
- 1986 : Bad Blues is My Business (Bad Records BAD-30001)
- 1987 : Midnight Beat (Charly [UK] CRB-1148)
- 1989 : Blues 'n' Stuff (Ichiban ICHCD-1047)
- 1991 : Love Desperado (Ichiban/Wild Dog ICHCD-9008)
- 1991 : Rockin' Harmonica Blues Man with Kid Thomas (Wolf WBJ-018)
- 1992 : Struttin' My Stuff (Ichiban/Wild Dog ICH-9020)
- 1993 : Jerry 'Boogie' McCain: Strange Kind of Feelin' with Tiny Kennedy and Clayton Love (Alligator ALCD-2701) early 50s recordings
- 1993 : I've Got the Blues All Over Me (Ichiban/Wild Dog ICH-9106)
- 1995 : That's What They Want: The Best of Jerry McCain (AVI/Excello CD-3009) all Excello material; tracks 1 to 12 recorded at Nashboro Studios, Nashville, TN, 1956–1957; tracks 13 to 23 are demos recorded in McCain's living room in Gadsden, AL, 1955.
- 1996 : Turn Your Damper Down (Black & Allright LP-001)
- 1997 : Rock 'n' Roll Ball (Atomic Bomb LP-701)
- 1997 : Broad Street Blues Bash (Riverfest CD-001)
- 1998 : The Jig's Up: Complete 50s Recordings (JMC CD-2111)
- 1998 : Jerry McCain (Retrospectives) (Ichiban ICH-1516)
- 1999 : This Stuff Just Kills Me (Jericho/Music Maker 90005)
- 1999 : Good Stuff! (Varèse Sarabande/Varèse Vintage VSD-6022)
- 2000 : Somebody's Been Talking: The Complete Jewel Singles 1965–72 (Westside WESM-625)
- 2000 : Soul Shag (Sterling [UK] 20702)
- 2000 : Southern Harp Attack with Frank Frost (P-Vine [Japan] PCD-24047)
- 2001 : Unplugged (Music Maker MMCD-21)
- 2001 : Absolutely the Best: Complete Jewel Singles 1965–1972 (Varèse Sarabande/Fuel 2000 [03020 61098 25])
- 2002 : Jerry McCain (American Roots: Blues) (Ichiban CD-01018)
- 2003 : Boogie is My Name (Music Maker MMCD-34)
- 2008 : Better Late Than Never: The Greatest Hits (Boogie Down Records CD-2008)
- 2021 : Tough Stuff: The Hot Harmonica Singles of Jerry McCain 1953–1962 (Jasmine JASMCD-3154) includes all his singles (A & B sides) for Trumpet (except 218), Excello, Rex, and OKeh (except 7170) Records.

=== Singles ===
Year	A-Side	B-Side	Artist	Record label
1953	"East of the Sun"	"Wine-O-Wine"	Jerry McCain & His Orchestra	Trumpet 217
1953	"Ooh Wee Baby"	"Feel Just Like I'm in Love"	Jerry "Boogie" McCain	Trumpet 218
1954	"Stay Out of Automobiles"	"Love to Make Up"	Jerry "Boogie" McCain	Trumpet 231
1954	"Crazy 'Bout that Mess"	"Fall Guy"	Jerry McCain	Trumpet 232
1955	"That's What They Want"	"Courtin' in a Cadillac"	Jerry McCain & His Upstarts	Excello 2068
1956	"If It Wasn't for My Baby"	"You Don't Love Me No More"	Jerry McCain & His Upstarts	Excello 2079
1956	"Run, Uncle John, Run"	"Things Ain't Right"	Jerry McCain & His Upstarts	Excello 2081
1957	"My Next Door Neighbor"	"Trying to Please"	Jerry McCain & His Upstarts	Excello 2103
1957	"Listen! Young Girls"	"Bad Credit"	Jerry McCain & His Upstarts	Excello 2111
1957	"Groom without a Bride"	"The Jig's Up"	Jerry McCain & His Upstarts	Excello 2127
1960	"She's Tough"	"Steady"	Jerry McCain	Rex 1014
1962	"Red Top"	"Twist '62"	Jerry McCain	Okeh 7150
1962	"Run Back Home"	"Jet Stream"	Jerry McCain & His Harmonica	Okeh 7157
1962	"Popcorn"	"Jet Stream"	Jerry McCain	Okeh 7158
1963	"Turn the Lights on Popeye"	"Hop Stroll"	Jerry McCain	Okeh 7170
1965	"Courtin' in a Cadillac"	"Calling All Cows"	Jerry McCain / Blues Rockers	Excello 2268
1965	"Here's Where You Get It"	"Pokey"	Jerry McCain	Rik's 153-65
1965	"Love Me Right"	"Ting-Tang-Tigalu"	Jerry McCain	Continental C-777-1/2
1965	"Shimmy Shimmy Sham"	"Pussycat A Go Go"	The Shindigs feat. Jerry McCain	Esco Prod. 100
1965	"Edna"	"She's Righteous"	Jerry McCain	Esco Prod. 101
1965	"728 Texas"	"Homogenized Love"	Jerry McCain	Jewel 753
1966	"Honky Tonk"	"Sugar Baby"	Jerry McCain	Jewel 761
1966	"Love Ain't Nothing to Play With"	"She's Crazy 'bout Entertainers"	Jerry McCain	Jewel 773
1967	"Juicy Lucy"	"Put it Where I Can Get It"	Jerry McCain	Jewel 790
1969	"Homogenized Love"	"728 Texas"	Jerry McCain	Python PKM-02
1970	"Welfare Cadillac Blues"	"Funky Down Easy"	Jerry McCain	Royal American RA-4
1970	"The Cockfight"	"I'm in Trouble"	Jerry McCain	Royal American RA-14
1972	"Somebody's Been Talking"	"Soul Spasm"	Jerry McCain	Jewel 828
1973	"Rainin' in My Heart"	"King Bee"	Jerry McCain	Romulus R-1001
1973	"The Woodpecker Song"	"Hot Nuts"	Jerry McCain	Romulus R-1004
1977	"Steady"	"She's Tough"	Jerry McCain	GAS 1101
1977	"Ruff Stuff"	"What About You"	Jerry McCain	GAS 1102
1979	"Blues on the Move"	"Cost of Living"	Jerry McCain	Robox EQ-1904
1980	"Love Whip"	"If I'm Your Fool"	Jerry McCain	GAS 106
1984	"Hot Nuts"	"The Woodpecker Song"	Jerry McCain	Merit M45-2508
1985	"Long Tall Texan"	"If I'm Your Fool"	Jerry McCain	Merit M45-2514
1986	"She Tore Me Up"	"A Little Bit of Something"	Jerry McCain	BAD 1001
1986	"53 Year Old Man"	"Your Place or Mine"	Jerry McCain	BAD 1002
1989	"She's Tough"	"Soul Shag"	Jerry McCain	Heart HR-1961
1990	"Trying to Please"	"My Next Door Neighbor"	Jerry McCain & His Upstarts	Delta 6 (promo)
1991	"Burn the Crackhouse Down"	"Blues Tribute"	Jerry McCain	Ichiban 92-242
1992	"Vote"	"Strut My Stuff"	Jerry McCain	Ichiban 92-264
1994	"Tumblin' in the Sea"	"Teddy Bear"	Jerry McCain	Ichiban 94-295
2001	"Geronimo Rock & Roll"	"Choo Choo Rock"	Jerry McCain	Norton 855
2001	"A Cutie Named Judy"	"It Must Be Love"	Jerry McCain	Norton 856
2001	"I'm a Ding Dong Daddy"	"Bell in my Heart"	Jerry McCain	Norton 857
2001	"My Next Door Neighbor"	"Crying Like a Fool"	Jerry McCain	Norton 858
2001	"Rock 'n' Roll Ball"	"I Want Somebody to Love"	Jerry McCain	Norton 859
