= KFFA-FM =

- Helena, Arkansas; United States
- Frequency: 103.1 MHz
- Branding: The Mix 103.1

Programming
- Format: Adult contemporary
- Affiliations: KZRI (1972–1981); KCRI (1981–1994)

Ownership
- Owner: Monte Spearman and Gentry Todd Spearman; (Spearman Land and Development)
- Sister stations: KCMC-FM, KFFA, KJMT, KRZP

History
- First air date: 1972 (as KZRI)

Technical information
- Licensing authority: FCC
- Facility ID: 16518
- Class: C3
- ERP: 13,000 watts
- HAAT: 97 meters (318 ft)
- Transmitter coordinates: 34°31′39.3″N 90°37′46.3″W

Links
- Public license information: Public file; LMS
- Website: www.hpr.network/radio-station-portfolio

KFFA-FM (103.1 FM) is a radio station broadcasting an adult contemporary music format. Licensed to Helena, Arkansas, United States, the station is currently owned by Monte Spearman and Gentry Todd Spearman, through licensee Spearman Land and Development.

== See also ==
- KFFA (AM)
