= KCMC-FM =

- Viola, Arkansas; United States
- Broadcast area: Mountain Home, Arkansas; Cherokee Village, Arkansas
- Frequency: 94.3 MHz
- Branding: 94.3 Christian FM

Programming
- Format: Contemporary Christian

Ownership
- Owner: Monte and Gentry Spearman; (High Plains Radio Network, LLC)
- Operator: E Radio Network, LLC
- Sister stations: KFFA, KFFA-FM, KJMT, KRZP

History
- First air date: May 9, 2007 (as KSMZ)
- Former call signs: KSMZ (2006–2012)

Technical information
- Licensing authority: FCC
- Facility ID: 166081
- Class: C3
- ERP: 8,100 watts
- HAAT: 174 meters (571 ft)
- Transmitter coordinates: 36.325056°N 91.978194°W

Links
- Public license information: Public file; LMS

KCMC-FM (94.3 MHz) is a radio station airing a contemporary Christian format licensed to Viola, Arkansas. The station serves the areas of Mountain Home, Arkansas, Horseshoe Bend, Arkansas, and Cherokee Village, Arkansas, and is owned by Monte and Gentry Spearman, through licensee High Plains Radio Network, LLC and operated by E Radio Network, LLC.

== History ==
KSMZ was licensed by the FCC on May 9, 2007. In 2012, they changed callsigns to KCMC-FM. In 2020, they switched from a classic country format branded as “Mountain Country” with a slogan of “Pure Country Music” to “Arkansas Rocks”, a chain of radio stations in Arkansas.
