= Charley Booker =

American blues singer and guitarist (1925–1989)

- Born: September 3, 1925; Moorhead, Mississippi, U.S.
- Died: September 20, 1989 (aged 64) South Bend, Indiana, U.S.
- Genres: Blues
- Instrument: Guitar
- Years active: 1930s–1980s
- Labels: Modern; Rhythm & Blues
- Formerly of: Houston Boines; Ike Turner

Charley Booker (September 3, 1925 – September 20, 1989) was an American blues singer and guitarist from the Mississippi Delta, who recorded in the early 1950s for Modern Records.

== Early life and career ==
Booker was born in 1925 on a plantation between the Mississippi communities of Moorhead and Sunflower, the son of Lucius Booker. There is some doubt about his date of birth: in interviews, Booker stated that he was born in 1925, but Social Security records give the date as September 3, 1919.

He learned to play guitar from his uncle, who had played with Charley Patton. Booker stated that as a child he saw Patton perform near Indianola, Mississippi. He worked occasionally as a musician from the late 1930s. By the early 1940s he had moved to Leland, Mississippi, and in 1947 he moved to Greenville, Mississippi, where he worked with the pianist Willie Love and also met or worked with Elmore James, Sonny Boy Williamson II, Little Milton, Ike Turner and Houston Boines. By 1951 he had his own radio show (possibly on station WDVM).

== Recordings ==
In 1952 Booker was approached by Ike Turner to record for Modern Records. The recording session was set up by Joe Bihari of Modern Records at the Club Casablanca on Nelson Street, in Greenville, on January 23, 1952. Booker was backed by Houston Boines on harmonica, Turner on piano and Jesse "Cleanhead" Love on drums. The same band also backed several songs by Boines. Despite the piano being "horribly out of tune" and problems with local law enforcement, the session resulted in two singles released under Booker's name, one on Modern Records and the other on the associated Blues & Rhythm label, as well as releases by Boines. The Blues & Rhythm release, pairing "No Ridin' Blues" with "Rabbit Blues", sold well locally, but Booker did not record again for Modern. A session later the same year for Sam Phillips was unreleased at the time.

== Later life and death ==
Early in 1953 Booker moved to South Bend, Indiana, and ceased playing music as a full-time occupation. He continued to play locally, but his only further recording was a live appearance with Joe Willie Wilkins at a 1973 blues festival at the University of Notre Dame, in South Bend. He died on September 20, 1989.

== Discography ==
- "No Ridin' Blues" / "Rabbit Blues" (Blues & Rhythm 7003)
- "Moonrise Blues" / "Charley's Boogie Woogie" (Modern 878)
