= Boyd Gilmore =

American songwriter

- Born: June 1, 1905 or June 12, 1910; Belzoni, Mississippi, U.S.
- Died: December 23, 1976 (aged 66/71) Fresno, California, U.S.
- Genres: Delta blues
- Occupations: Singer, guitarist, songwriter
- Instruments: Vocals, guitar
- Years active: Early 1950s – 1976
- Labels: Modern Records, Sun Records

Boyd Gilmore (June 1, 1905 or June 12, 1910 – December 23, 1976) was an American Delta blues singer, guitarist and songwriter. Among the songs he wrote were "All in My Dreams", "Believe I'll Settle Down", "I Love My Little Woman" and "If That's Your Girl". Gilmore also recorded a version of fellow Delta bluesman Robert Johnson's track, "Ramblin' on My Mind".

He could play guitar, although there is no recorded evidence of his work on that instrument. According to AllMusic, he was "an exuberant singer".

== Biography ==
Sources vary over the details of his birth. Gilmore was either born near Inverness, Mississippi, in 1905, or to Sam Gilmore and Luella Bryant on June 12, 1910 in Belzoni, Mississippi.

He recorded "Ramblin' on My Mind" on January 23, 1952, at Casablanca Lounge in Greenville, Mississippi, which he sang with accompaniment by Ike Turner on piano and Jesse "Cleanhead" Love on drums. The track was released by Modern Records, with "Just an Army Boy" on the B-side. At the same session, Gilmore recorded several other songs, including "All in My Dreams" and "Take a Little Walk with Me", which were released by Modern as a single. James Scott Jr. accompanied him on guitar, but his part fell victim to early recording technology, as an introduction and guitar break from Elmore James's "Please Find My Baby" was later spliced into "All in My Dreams".

Gilmore recorded "Believe I'll Settle Down" for Sun Records in Memphis, Tennessee in July 1953, accompanied by Pinetop Perkins on piano, Earl Hooker on guitar and Willie Nix on drums, but like some of his earlier recordings, it was not released at the time.

After his brief recording career, Gilmore performed in juke joints in the Delta for a while. He also performed regularly in St. Louis, Missouri, and Pine Bluff, Arkansas, during which period he lived in a boarded-up abandoned house. During the years he lived in Pine Bluff, Gilmore and Houston Stackhouse performed together, as they had previously, in the early 1950s. While in Pine Bluff, he often performed at a small club called Jack Rabbitts. In the late 1960s, Gilmore settled in California and lived there until his death on December 23, 1976. He was interred at Odd Fellows Cemetery in Fresno, California.

== Discography ==
=== Singles ===
- 1952: "Ramblin' On My Mind" / "Just An Army Boy" (Modern 860)
- 1952: "All In My Dreams" / "Take A Little Walk With Me" (Modern 872)

=== Albums appearances ===
- 1966: Memphis ....On DownThe Post-War Blues Volume 2 (Post War Blues)
- 1977: Sun: The Roots Of Rock: Volume 12: Union Avenue Breakdown (Charly Records)
- 1994: Anthology of the Blues: Mississippi Blues. Archive Series-Volume 6 (P-Vine Records)
- 2003: The Modern Downhome Blues Sessions, Volume 1: Arkansas & Mississippi (Ace Records)
- 2010: Ike Turner – That Kat Sure Could Play! The Singles 1951–1957 (Secret Records Limited)

== See also ==
- List of Delta blues musicians
