= Alex Dixon (blues) =

American blues musician (born 1975)

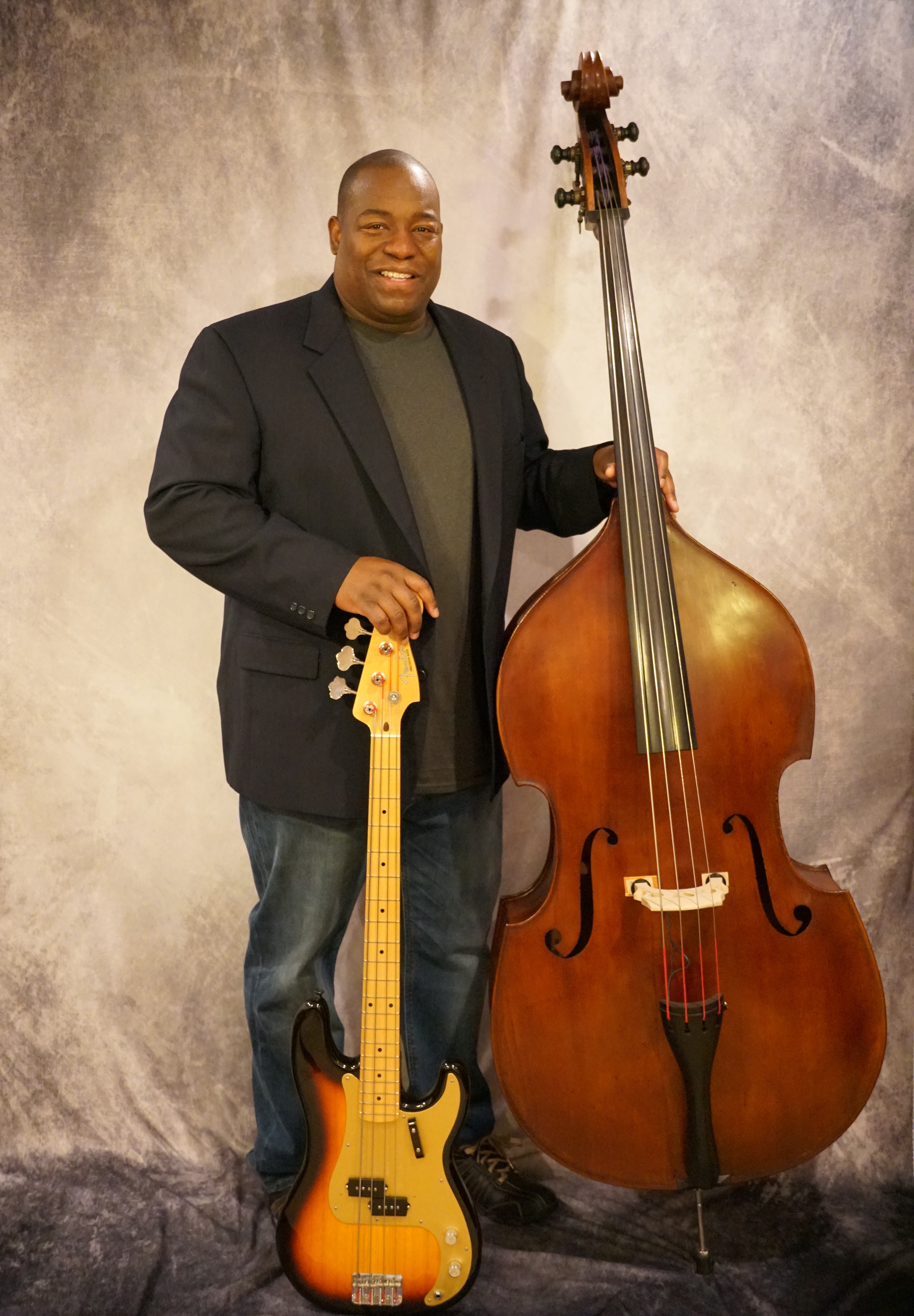

Background information
- Born: April 23, 1975 (age 50); Chicago, Illinois, U.S.
- Genres: Blues; Chicago blues; rhythm and blues; blues rock
- Occupations: Musician; songwriter; arranger; record producer; label owner
- Instruments: Vocals; double bass; piano
- Years active: 1981–present
- Labels: Bug; Dixon Landing Music
- Website: www.vintagedixon.com

Alex Dixon (born April 23, 1975) is an American blues musician, songwriter, producer, label owner and industry executive who is the grandson of Willie Dixon, one of the most important figures in the history of American music.

== Early life ==
Born in Chicago, Alex was raised by his grandfather and grandmother Marie in the family's South Side home, which was the epicenter of the city's blues community from the 1950s through the early 1980s. Alex started playing piano at age six, taking lessons from several of the most important keyboard players of the era, including Leonard Caston, Willie's former partner in the Big Three Trio; Lafayette Leake, a longtime member of the Muddy Waters Band; Little Brother Montgomery, a self-taught innovator whose career began in the 1920s; and his uncle, Arthur "Butch" Dixon, who toured for years with Willie as a member of his Chicago Blues All-Stars.

At age seven, Alex began performing with his grandfather at schools across the South Side of Chicago in an effort to bring the music to a new, younger audience. Alex played in several different styles as Willie introduced the youngsters to the blues and its history through spoken word and song. Their efforts laid the groundwork for what has become the Blues In The Schools program, an effort that now spans the globe.

When Willie and Marie relocated to the Los Angeles area in 1984, their grandson moved with them. When he was age 11, Willie began incorporating him into the family business and continuing to expose children to the music by appearing with him at local schools, work that later resulted in Alex becoming a member of his touring band for club and festival bookings.

Alex shares songwriting credit with his grandfather on 40 tunes, including "Study War No More," which appeared on Dixon's final album, the Grammy Award-winning Hidden Charms.

== Professional life ==
After Willie's death, Alex served as a deputy with the Los Angeles County Sheriffs Department for seven years and graduated from Aspen University in 2009 with a degree in criminal justice/law enforcement administration. He retired from the force to resume a career in music, after an off-duty incident involving an ex-convict gang member, who shot at him two or three times without hitting his mark, and who was subsequently convicted of first-degree murder in the death of a former roommate.

A past vice president of Blues Heaven Foundation, the non-profit organization Willie initiated in 1984, Alex supervised efforts to promote the music and award scholarships to younger musicians, delivering emergency assistance to older artists experiencing life crises and working in their behalf to recoup royalties for their recorded and published works.

He founded Dixon Landing Music—a combined recording label, publishing house and management firm—in Los Angeles in 1989 in an effort to continue his grandfather's legacy in promoting the careers of younger artists. Offices have been based in the San Francisco Bay area since his family relocated in 2012. He also assumed responsibilities as chief executive of Hoochie Coochie Music, which oversees his grandfather's extensive songwriting legacy, in 2016 following the death of his grandmother.

Alex was featured in the November/December 2021 issue of Living Blues, a magazine focused on blues music, which was originally founded in Chicago.

== Recording career ==
- The Blues Experience with Cash McCall – The Vintage Room (Dixon Landing Music 2007)

The first release on the Dixon Landing imprint, this collection of post-War blues featured the voice and guitar of Cash McCall, a blues and soul blues artist who worked frequently with Willie Dixon and was a longtime studio musician for Chess Records, Alex on keyboards and harmonica stylings from Steve Bell, the son of Chicago harp stalwart Carey Bell, and other young musicians. The 11 tracks—seven penned by Alex, three by Willie and one by McCall—conveyed the traditional sound established by the elder Dixon.

- The Alex Dixon Band – Rising From The Bushes (Dixon Landing Music 2009)

A blues-rock release, this album opens and closes with short spoken-word segments from Willie Dixon. Alex contributes keyboards with vocals handled by soprano Marcy Levy, aka Marcella Detroit, who co-wrote "Lay Down Sally" with Eric Clapton, as well as guitarist Alan Mirikitani, front man of the Los Angeles-based band BB Chung King and the Buddaheads. The lineup also included longtime Steve Miller Band bassist Gerald Johnson and percussionists James Gadsen, who previously recorded with Aretha Franklin and Aaron Neville, and Alvino Bennett, a longtime member of Koko Taylor & Her Blues Machine.

- Alex Dixon Presents... – The Real McCoy Featuring Lewis 'Big Lew' Powell (Dixon Landing Music 2020)

Dixon returns to his blues roots for this CD, which features contributions from Sugar Blue, the Grammy Award-winning harmonica player who was a former member of Willie's Chicago Blues Allstars, and marks the debut as a front man for Lewis "Big Lew" Powell, best known as the percussionist for Chicago vocalist Nellie "Tiger" Travis. A collection of traditional Chicago blues, it includes seven originals penned by Alex and three covers written by his grandfather. The lineup includes Bennett and Bell along with guitarists Melvin Taylor, Gino Matteo, Rico McFarland and Joey Delgado with Dixon on electric and upright bass and piano with Australian vocalist Whaia and Dixon's daughter, Leila, providing backing vocals.

== Awards and honors ==
On April 28, 2013, both Willie Dixon and Alex Dixon were enshrined as members of the Chicago Blues Hall of Fame. The ceremonies were conducted at Buddy Guy's nightclub, Legends.

On June 15, 2015, Dixon performed as a headliner at the Chicago Blues Festival along with McCall, Sugar Blue and other members of the Dixon family as part of its Willie Dixon Centennial Tribute.
