= KJMT =

- Calico Rock, Arkansas; United States
- Broadcast area: Mountain Home, Arkansas; Mountain View, Arkansas
- Frequency: 97.1 MHz
- Branding: Fox Sports Radio

Programming
- Format: Sports
- Affiliations: Fox Sports Radio

Ownership
- Owner: Monte and Gentry Spearman; (High Plains Radio Network, LLC)
- Operator: E Radio Network, LLC
- Sister stations: KCMC-FM, KFFA, KFFA-FM, KRZP

History
- First air date: February 2007
- Former call signs: KEZG (2005–2007, CP)
- Call sign meaning: K J MounTain

Technical information
- Licensing authority: FCC
- Facility ID: 162375
- Class: C3
- ERP: 5,200 watts
- HAAT: 218 meters (715 ft)
- Transmitter coordinates: 36.092028°N 92.262944°W

Links
- Public license information: Public file; LMS

KJMT (97.1 FM) is a radio station licensed to Calico Rock, Arkansas, United States, the station serves the areas of Mountain Home, Arkansas and Mountain View, Arkansas, and is currently owned by Monte and Gentry Spearman, through licensee High Plains Radio Network, LLC and operated by E Radio Network, LLC.

== Programming ==
KJMT's previous logo

Until March 31, 2023, KJMT carried a news/talk format under the name "Mountain Talk 97.1", featuring a variety of talk shows such as Sean Hannity, Glenn Beck, Laura Ingraham, Dave Ramsey, and Rusty Humphries. The Mountain Talk format moved to KRZP on March 31, 2023.
