= Record producer =

Supervisor of a music-creating project

Record producers
Occupation
- Names: Music producer, record producer
- Occupation type: Profession
- Activity sectors: Music industry

Description
- Competencies: Instrumental skills, keyboard knowledge, arranging, vocal coaching
- Fields of employment: Recording studios
- Related jobs: Music executive, recording engineer, executive producer, film producer, A&R

A record producer or music producer is a music-creating project's overall supervisor whose responsibilities can involve a range of creative and technical leadership roles. Typically the job involves hands-on oversight of recording sessions; ensuring artists deliver acceptable, high-quality performances, supervising the technical engineering of the recording, and coordinating the production team and process. The producer's involvement in a musical project can vary in depth and scope. Sometimes in popular genres the producer may create the recording's entire sound and structure. However, in classical music recording, for example, the producer serves as more of a liaison between the conductor and the engineering team. The role is often likened to that of a film director, though there are important differences. It is distinct from the role of an executive producer, who is mostly involved in the recording project on an administrative level, and from the audio engineer who operates the recording technology.

Varying by project, the producer may or may not choose all of the artists. If employing only synthesized or sampled instrumentation, the producer may be the sole artist. Conversely, some artists do their own production. Some producers are their own engineers, operating the technology across the project: pre production, recording, mixing, and mastering. Record producers' precursors were "A&R men", who likewise could blend entrepreneurial, creative, and technical roles, but often exercised scant creative influence, as record production still focused, into the 1950s, on simply improving the record's sonic match to the artists' own live performance.

Advances in recording technology, especially the 1940s advent of tape recording—which Les Paul promptly innovated further to develop multitrack recording—and the 1950s rise of electronic instruments, turned record production into a specialty. In popular music, then, producers like George Martin, Phil Spector and Brian Eno led its evolution into its present use of elaborate techniques and unrealistic sounds, creating songs impossible to originate live. After the 1980s, production's move from analog to digital further expanded possibilities. By now, DAWs, or digital audio workstations, like Logic Pro, Pro Tools, and Studio One, turn an ordinary computer into a production console, whereby a solitary novice can become a skilled producer in a thrifty home studio. In the 2010s, efforts began to increase the prevalence of producers and engineers who are women, heavily outnumbered by men and prominently accoladed only in classical music.

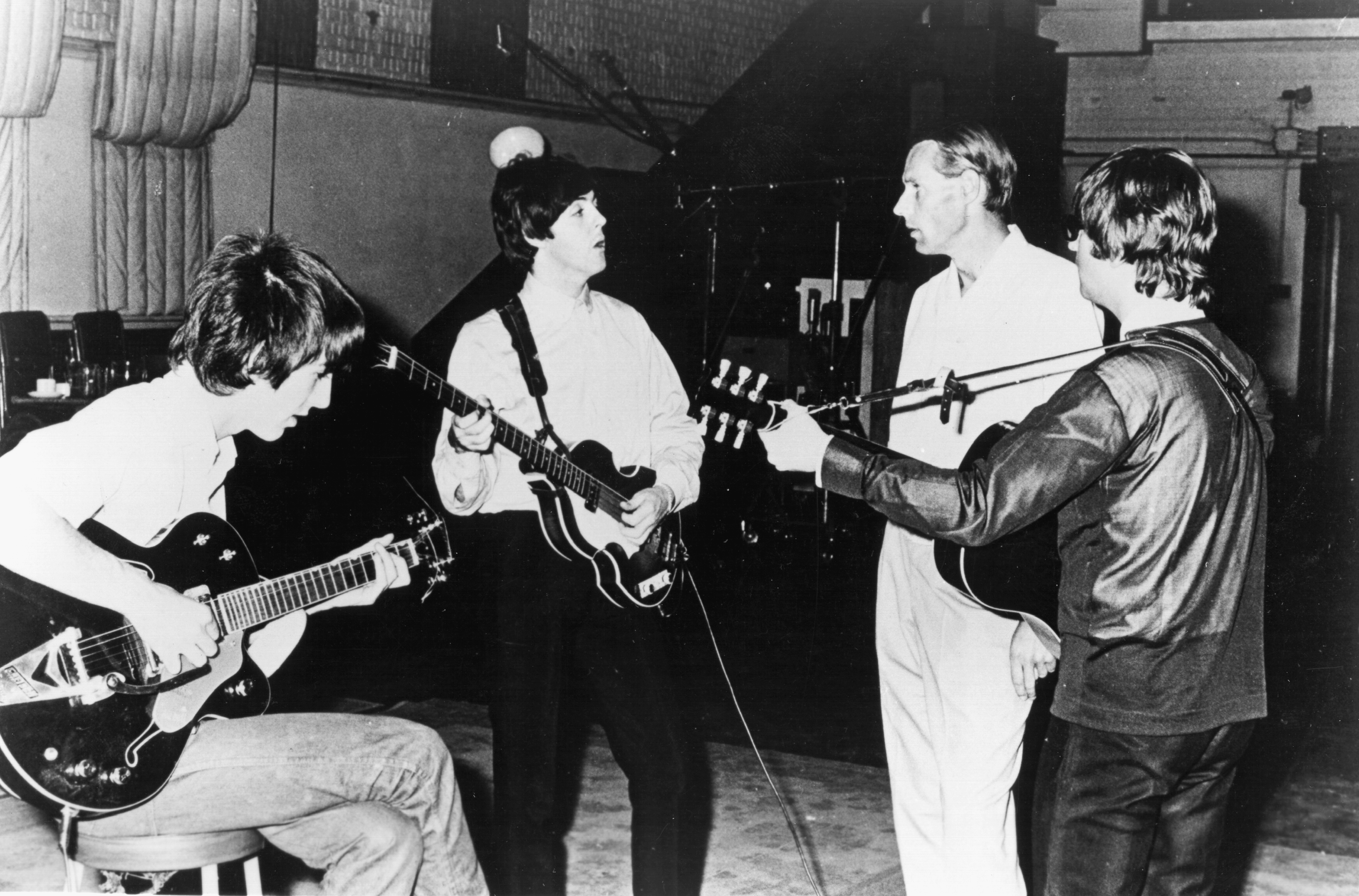
Music producer Sir George Martin, best known for his work with the Beatles, pictured with members George Harrison, Paul McCartney and John Lennon at a recording session at Abbey Road in 1966

== Production overview ==
As a broad project, the creation of a popular music recording may be split across three specialists: the executive producer, who oversees business partnerships and financing; the vocal producer or vocal arranger, who aids vocal performance via expert critique and coaching of vocal technique, and the record producer or music producer, who, often called simply the producer, directs the overall creative process of recording the song in its final mix.

The producer's roles can include gathering ideas, composing music, choosing session musicians, proposing changes to song arrangements, coaching the performers, controlling sessions, supervising the audio mixing, and, in some cases, supervising the audio mastering. A producer may give creative control to the artists themselves, taking on a supervisory or advisory role instead. As to qualifying for a Grammy nomination, the Recording Academy defines a producer:

The person who has overall creative and technical control of the entire recording project, and the individual recording sessions that are part of that project. He or she is present in the recording studio or at the location recording and works directly with the artist and engineer. The producer makes creative and aesthetic decisions that realize both the artist's and label's goals in the creation of musical content. Other duties include, but are not limited to: keeping budgets and schedules; adhering to deadlines; hiring musicians, singers, studios, and engineers; overseeing other staffing needs; and editing (Classical projects).

The producer often selects and collaborates with a mixing engineer, who focuses on the especially technological aspects of the recording process, namely, operating the electronic equipment and blending the raw, recorded tracks of the chosen performances, whether vocal or instrumental, into a mix, either stereo or surround sound. Then a mastering engineer further adjusts this recording for distribution on the chosen media. A producer may work on only one or two songs or on an artist's entire album, helping develop the album's overall vision. The record producers may also take on the role of executive producer, managing the budget, schedules, contracts, and negotiations.

== Historical developments ==
=== A&R team ===
(Artists and Repertoires)

In the 1880s, the record industry began by simply having the artist perform at a phonograph. In 1924, the trade journal Talking Machine World, covering the phonograph and record industries, reported that Eddie King, Victor Records' manager of the "New York artist and repertoire department", had planned a set of recordings in Los Angeles. Later, folklorist Archie Green called this perhaps the earliest printed use of A&R man. Actually, it says neither "A&R man" nor even "A&R", an initialism perhaps coined by Billboard magazine in 1946, and entering wide use in the late 1940s.

In the 1920s and 1930s, A&R executives, like Ben Selvin at Columbia Records, Nathaniel Shilkret at Victor Records, and Bob Haring at Brunswick Records became the precursors of record producers, supervising recording and often leading session orchestras. During the 1940s, major record labels increasingly opened official A&R departments, whose roles included supervision of recording. Meanwhile, independent recording studios opened, helping originate record producer as a specialty. But despite a tradition of some A&R men writing music, record production still referred to just the manufacturing of record discs.

=== Record producers ===
After World War II, pioneering A&R managers who transitioned influentially to record production as now understood, while sometimes owning independent labels, include J. Mayo Williams and John Hammond. Upon moving from Columbia Records to Mercury Records, Hammond appointed Mitch Miller to lead Mercury's popular recordings in New York. Miller then produced country-pop crossover hits by Patti Page and by Frankie Laine, moved from Mercury to Columbia, and became a leading A&R man of the 1950s.

During the decade, A&R executives increasingly directed songs' sonic signatures, although many still simply teamed singers with musicians, while yet others exercised virtually no creative influence. The term record producer in its current meaning—the creative director of song production—appearing in a 1953 issue of Billboard magazine, became widespread in the 1960s. Still, a formal distinction was elusive for some time more. A&R managers might still be creative directors, like William "Mickey" Stevenson, hired by Berry Gordy, at the Motown record label.

=== Tape recording ===
In 1947, the American market gained audio recording onto magnetic tape. At the record industry's 1880s dawn, rather, recording was done by phonograph, etching the sonic waveform vertically into a cylinder. By the 1930s, a gramophone etched it laterally across a disc. Constrained in tonal range, whether bass or treble, and in dynamic range, records made a grand, concert piano sound like a small, upright piano, and maximal duration was four and a half minutes. Selections and performance were often altered accordingly, and playing this disc—the wax master—destroyed it. The finality often caused anxiety that restrained performance to prevent error. In the 1940s, during World War II, the Germans refined audio recording onto magnetic tape—uncapping recording duration and allowing immediate playback, rerecording, and editing—a technology that premised emergence of record producers in their current roles.

=== Multitrack recording ===
Early in the recording industry, a record was attained by simply having all of the artists perform together live in one take. In 1945, by recording a musical element while playing a previously recorded record, Les Paul developed a recording technique called "sound on sound". By this, the final recording could be built piece by piece and tailored, effecting an editing process. In one case, Paul produced a song via 500 recorded discs. But, besides the tedium of this process, it serially degraded the sound quality of previously recorded elements, rerecorded as ambient sound. Yet in 1948, Paul adopted tape recording, enabling true multitrack recording by a new technique, "overdubbing".

To enable overdubbing, Paul revised the tape recorder itself by adding a second playback head, and terming it the preview head. Joining the preexisting recording head, erase head, and playback head, the preview head allows the artist to hear the extant recording over headphones playing it in synchrony, "in sync", with the present performance being recorded alone on an isolated track. This isolation of multiple tracks enables countless mixing possibilities. Producers began recording initially only the "bed tracks"—the rhythm section, including the bassline, drums, and rhythm guitar—whereas vocals and instrument solos could be added later. A horn section, for example, could record a week later, and a string section another week later. A singer could perform her own backup vocals, or a guitarist could play 15 layers.

=== Electronic instruments ===
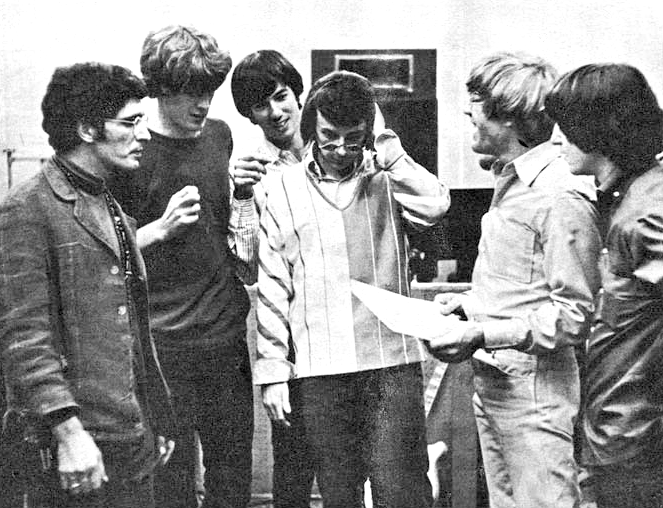
Phil Spector producing Modern Folk Quartet, 1966

Across the 1960s, popular music increasingly switched from acoustic instruments, like piano, upright bass, acoustic guitar, and brass instruments, to electronic instruments, like electric guitars, keyboards, and synthesizers, employing instrument amplifiers and speakers. These could mimic acoustic instruments or create utterly new sounds. Soon, by combining the capabilities of tape, multitrack recording, and electronic instruments, producers like Phil Spector, George Martin, and Joe Meek rendered sounds unattainable live. Similarly, in jazz fusion, Teo Macero, producing Miles Davis's 1970 album Bitches Brew, spliced sections of extensive improvisation sessions.

=== Performer-producer ===
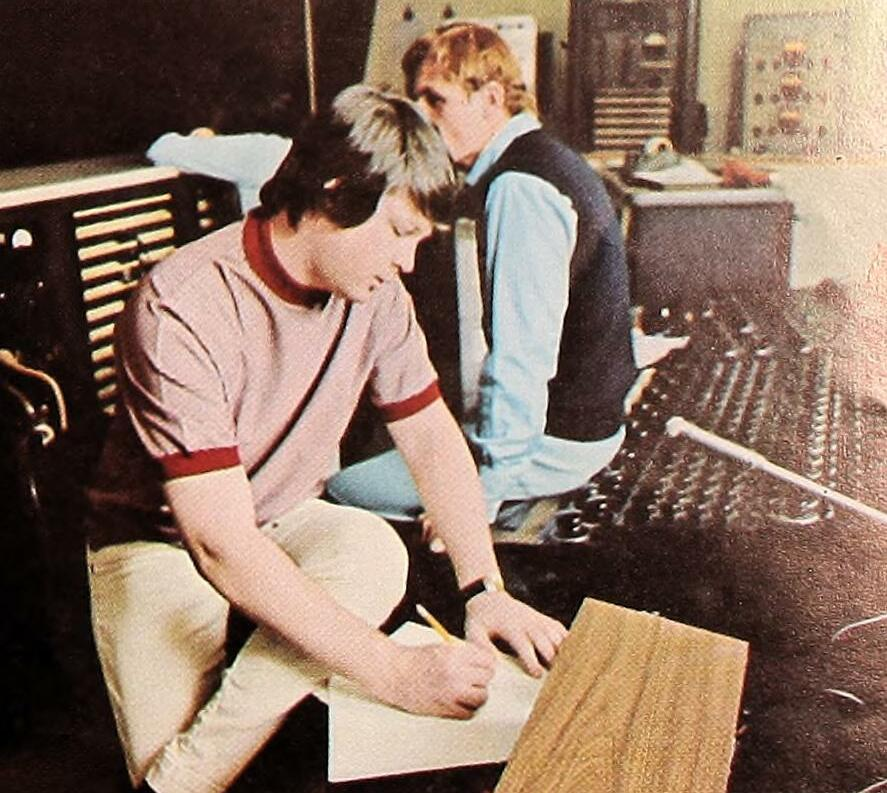
Brian Wilson during a recording session, 1966

In the 1960s, rock acts like the Beatles, the Rolling Stones, and the Kinks produced some of their own songs, although many such songs are officially credited to specialist producers. Yet especially influential was the Beach Boys, whose band leader Brian Wilson took over from his father Murry within a couple of years after the band's commercial breakthrough. By 1964, Wilson had taken Spector's techniques to unseen sophistication. Wilson alone produced all Beach Boys recordings between 1963 and 1967. Using multiple studios and multiple attempts of instrumental and vocal tracks, Wilson selected the best combinations of performance and audio quality, and used tape editing to assemble a composite performance.

=== Digital production ===
The 1980s advent of digital processes and formats rapidly replaced analog processes and formats, namely, tape and vinyl. Although recording onto quality tape, at least half an inch wide and traveling 15 inches per second, had limited "tape hiss" to silent sections, digital's higher signal-to-noise ratio, SNR, abolished it. Digital also imparted to the music a perceived "pristine" sound quality, if also a loss of analog recordings' perceived "warm" quality and better-rounded bass. Yet whereas editing tape media requires physically locating the target audio on the ribbon, cutting there, and splicing pieces, editing digital media offers inarguable advantages in ease, efficiency, and possibilities.

In the 1990s, digital production reached affordable home computers via production software. By now, recording and mixing are often centralized in DAWs, digital audio workstations—for example, Pro Tools, Logic Pro, Ableton, Cubase, Reason, and FL Studio—for which plugins, by third parties, effect virtual studio technology. DAWs fairly standard in the industry are Logic Pro and Pro Tools. Physical devices involved include the main mixer, MIDI controllers to communicate among equipment, the recording device itself, and perhaps effects gear that is outboard. Yet literal recording is sometimes still analog, onto tape, whereupon the raw recording is converted to a digital signal for processing and editing, as some producers still find audio advantages to recording onto tape.

Conventionally, tape is more forgiving of overmodulation, whereby dynamic peaks exceed the maximal recordable signal level: tape's limitation, a physical property, is magnetic capacity, which tapers off, smoothing the overmodulated waveform even at a signal nearly 15 decibels too "hot", whereas a digital recording is ruined by harsh distortion of "clipping" at any overshoot. In digital recording, however, a recent advancement, 32-bit float, enables DAWs to undo clipping. Still, some criticize digital instruments and workflows for excess automation, allegedly impairing creative or sonic control. In any case, as production technology has drastically changed, so have the knowledge demands, although DAWs enables novices, even teenagers at home, to learn production independently. Some have attained professional competence before ever working with an artist.

== Women in producing ==
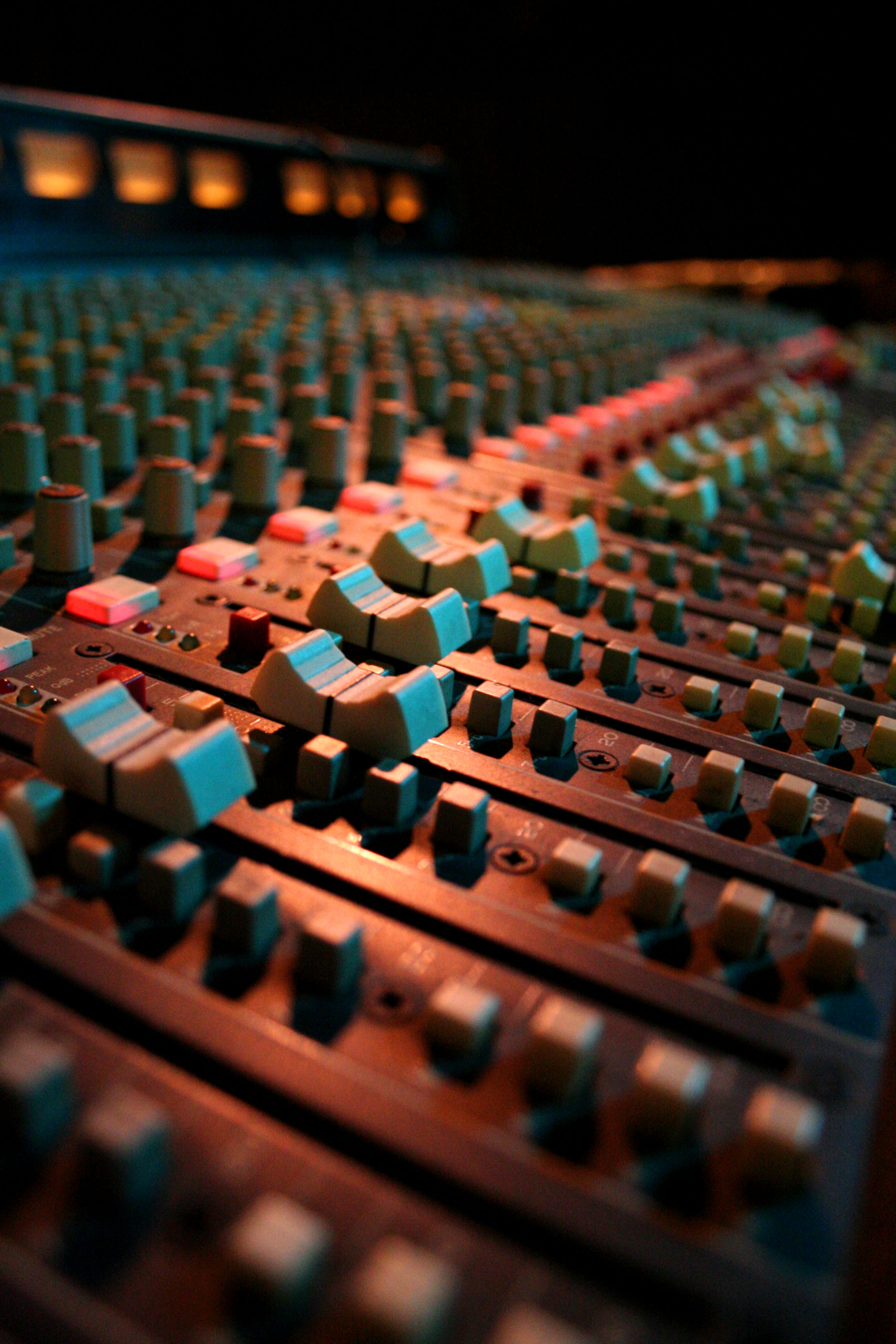
Mixing console

Among female record producers, Sylvia Moy was the first at Motown, Gail Davies the first on Nashville's Music Row, and Ethel Gabriel, with RCA, the first at a major record label. Lillian McMurry, owning Trumpet Records, produced influential blues records. Meanwhile, Wilma Cozart Fine produced hundreds of records for Mercury Records' classical division. For classical production, three women have won Grammy awards, and Judith Sherman's 2015 win was her fifth. Yet in nonclassical, no woman has won Producer of the Year, awarded since 1975 and only one even nominated for a record not her own, Linda Perry. After Lauren Christy's 2004 nomination, Linda Perry's 2019 nomination was the next for a woman. On why no woman had ever won it, Perry commented, "I just don't think there are that many women interested." In the U.K., Lynsey de Paul was an early female record producer, having produced both of her Ivor Novello award-winning songs.

Across the decades, many female artists have produced their own music. For instance, artists Kate Bush, Madonna, Mariah Carey, Shakira, Janet Jackson, Beyoncé (even that of Destiny's Child and the Carters), Lana Del Rey, Taylor Swift, and Lorde have produced or coproduced and Ariana Grande who produces and arranges her vocals as well as being an audio engineer. Still among specialists, despite some prominent women, including Missy Elliott in hip hop and Sylvia Massy in rock, the vast majority have been men. Early in the 2010s, asked for insights that she herself had gleaned as a woman who has specialized successfully in the industry, Wendy Page remarked, "The difficulties are usually very short-lived. Once people realize that you can do your job, sexism tends to lower its ugly head." Still, when tasked to explain her profession's sex disparity, Page partly reasoned that record labels, dominated by men, have been, she said, "mistrustful of giving a woman the reins of an immense, creative project like making a record." Ultimately, the reasons are multiple and not fully clear, although prominently proposed factors include types of sexism and scarcity of female role models in the profession.

In January 2018, a research team led by Stacy L. Smith, founder and director of the Annenberg Inclusion Initiative, based in the USC Annenberg School for Communication and Journalism, issued a report, estimating that in the prior several years, about 2% of popular songs' producers were female. Also that month, Billboard magazine queried, "Where are all the female music producers?" Upon the Annenberg Inclusion Initiative's second annual report, released in February 2019, its department at USC reported, "2018 saw an outcry from artists, executives and other music industry professionals over the lack of women in music" and "the plight of women in music", where women were allegedly being "stereotyped, sexualized, and shut out". Also in February 2019, the Recording Academy's Task Force on Diversity and Inclusion announced an initiative whereby over 200 artists and producers—ranging from Cardi B and Taylor Swift to Maroon 5 and Quincy Jones—agreed to consider at least two women for each producer or engineer position. The academy's website, Grammy.com, announced, "This initiative is the first step in a broader effort to improve those numbers and increase diversity and inclusion for all in the music industry."

== See also ==
- Audio engineering
- Electronic music
- Hip hop production
- Music executive
- Musician
