= Johnny Dollar (blues musician) =

- Also known as: Johnny Williams
- Born: John Louis Sibley; November 23, 1941; Greenville, Mississippi, U.S.
- Died: August 29, 2006 (aged 64) Chicago, Illinois, U.S.
- Genres: Chicago blues
- Occupations: Guitarist, singer and songwriter
- Instruments: Guitar, vocals
- Years active: 1960s–2006

John Louis Sibley (November 23, 1941 – August 29, 2006), known professionally as Johnny Dollar, was an American Chicago blues guitarist, singer and songwriter.

== Life and career ==
He was born in Greenville, Mississippi, United States. His music career commenced in Chicago, Illinois, when he began playing with Magic Sam during the 1960s. His fledgling start was cut short by undertaking eight years worth of military service. He enlisted in the Marines, but the first time he lied about his age, using his elder brother's details as a smokescreen. It took three years before the military unearthed the facts and he was sent back to Chicago. When Dollar reached the legal age of 18, he returned to his military duties, this time via the draft. He served two tours during the Vietnam War. Upon discharge from service at the end of the decade, he returned to Chicago. He then joined the Soundmasters as lead vocalist, being the only non-family member of the ensemble. His bandmates included the Fisher brothers; Thomas, Charles, Eddie, and Jim. The most notable of the group's recordings was the single, "Your Love Has Got to Me".

By the 1970s, Dollar had decided to go solo, but to boost his earnings joined the Chicago Police Department. He had a tough time while serving, surviving five gunshot wounds. These left him with scars on his stomach and back, and he also survived a gunshot wound to his head. Despite living through the Vietnam experiences without a scratch, his walking a police beat in the tougher neighborhoods of the Windy City, left him battle scarred. It was another injury sustained at the back end of the 1970s that effectively ended his career in law enforcement. In his spare time, Dollar had continued to play his guitar in Chicago nightspots, a routine he continued throughout the 1980s and beyond. His performing activities also incorporated a spell playing in Europe. In 1980, the French record label, Isabel Records, issued his debut album, My Soul is Blue.

His fondness for a drink and eye for the ladies got him into various awkward situations, although his guitar playing remained strong and full of control. In 1986, his second album, J.D.'s Blues, was released via B.L.U.E.S. R&B Records. Guest appearances on the recording included Henry Johnson on guitar on one track, and vocals from Big Time Sarah on another. Dollar wrote all but one of the seven tracks on the album. Johnny Dollar performed at the Chicago Blues Festival, on June 6, 1994.

He continued to perform in and around Chicago, but starting to suffer from congestive heart failure, which meant that further distance excursions were curtailed. On the night of November 1, 1999, Dollar was hit by a car. For three weeks he remained in a coma at Northwestern Memorial Hospital in Chicago, with none of those attending to him knowing his name. He was transferred to another hospital in West Side, Chicago, when his wallet, and therefore identity, was discovered in a pile of removed clothing he was wearing at the time of the accident. When conscious, Dollar had to contend with the effects of a broken pelvis, broken arm and a head injury, the latter that affected both his memory and also left him, at times, disorientated. After months of rehabilitation, Dollar was able to take to the stage at a Thanksgiving Evening in 2000; singing and playing like a man who had had a miraculous return from the dead. Less than three months after this event, Wolf Records released Dollar's first recording in 14 years, My Baby Loves Me.

My Baby Loves Me (2001) continued to highlight Dollar's playing and singing abilities. The album contained a selection of covers plus a couple of original numbers. The covers included reworkings of Guitar Slim's "The Things That I Used to Do", plus "My Baby Loves Me", "That's The Way Love Is" and a R&B classic in "(If Loving You Is Wrong) I Don't Want to Be Right". The final track on the album was "Funky Broadway", with Dollar's best guitar work to the fore.

Johnny Dollar died in August 2006, at the age of 64.

== Discography ==
Year	Title	Record label
1980	My Soul is Blue	Isabel Records
1986	J.D.'s Blues	B.L.U.E.S. R&B Records
2001	My Baby Loves Me	Wolf Records
