= Robert Nighthawk =

American blues musician (1909–1967)

Background information
- Also known as: Robert Lee McCoy
- Born: Robert Lee McCollum; November 30, 1909; Helena, Arkansas, U.S.
- Died: November 5, 1967 (aged 57) Helena, Arkansas, U.S.
- Genres: Blues
- Occupation: Musician
- Instruments: Guitar; harmonica; vocals
- Labels: Victor; Bluebird; Decca; Aristocrat; Chess; Delmark; United; States

Robert Lee McCollum (November 30, 1909 – November 5, 1967) was an American blues musician who played and recorded under the pseudonyms Robert Lee McCoy and Robert Nighthawk. He was the father of the blues musician Sam Carr. Nighthawk was inducted into the Blues Hall of Fame in 1983.

== Life and career ==
McCollum was born in Helena, Arkansas on November 30, 1909. He left home at an early age and became a busking musician. After a period traveling through southern Mississippi, he settled for a time in Memphis, Tennessee, where he played with local orchestras and musicians, such as the Memphis Jug Band. A particular influence during this period was Houston Stackhouse, from whom he learned to play slide guitar and with whom he performed on the radio in Jackson, Mississippi.

After further travels through Mississippi, he found it advisable to take his mother's name. As Robert Lee McCoy, he moved to St. Louis, Missouri, in the mid-1930s. Local musicians with whom he played included Henry Townsend, Big Joe Williams, and Sonny Boy Williamson. This led to two recording dates in 1938, the four musicians recording together at the Victor Records studio in Aurora, Illinois. He also recorded under his own name, including "Prowling Night-Hawk" (recorded May 5, 1937), from which he took his later pseudonym. These sessions led to the other musicians pursuing Chicago blues careers.

But McCoy continued his rambling life, playing and recording (for Victor/Bluebird Records and Decca Records) solo and with various other musicians, under various names. Kansas City Red was his drummer from the early 1940s to around 1946. He recorded Kansas City Red's song "The Moon Is Rising".

McCoy became a familiar voice on local radio stations, including WROX. A teenaged Ike Turner joined his band as a roadie in Clarksdale, Mississippi. Robert Lee McCoy disappeared in the mid-1940s.

Within a few years, he resurfaced in 1948 as the electric slide guitarist Robert Nighthawk and began recording for Aristocrat and Chess Records. The latter was also Muddy Waters' label. In 1949 and 1950, Nighthawk and Waters' styles were close enough that they competed for promotional activity. Waters was more marketable, as he was more reliable and a more confident stage performer, gaining him the attention.

In 1949, Nighthawk released the single "Annie Lee Blues"/"Black Angel Blues" on Aristocrat. The single was released under the name 'The Nighthawks', who were Nighthawk, pianist Ernest Lane, and bassist Willie Dixon. "Annie Lee Blues" reached number 13 on the Billboard R&B chart on December 31, 1949. Nighthawk recorded his final session for Chess (formerly Aristocrat) in 1950. He continued to perform and record, taking up with United Records and States Records 1951 and 1952, but did not achieve great commercial success.

In 1963, Nighthawk was rediscovered busking in Chicago. This led to further recording sessions and club dates and to his return to Arkansas, where he performed on the radio program King Biscuit Time, on KFFA. He also continued giving live performances on Chicago's Maxwell Street until 1964.

He had a stroke followed by a heart attack and died of heart failure at his home in Helena, Arkansas on November 5, 1967, aged 57. He is buried in Magnolia Cemetery, in Helena.

== Legacy ==
Nighthawk was elected into the Blues Hall of Fame in 1983.

In 2007, The Mississippi Blues Commission honored Nighthawk with a historical marker in Friars Point, Mississippi, on the Mississippi Blues Trail. The marker was placed at Friars Point because Nighthawk called the town his home at various times in his itinerant career. He recorded the song "Friars Point Blues" in 1940.

== Recordings ==
- Bricks in My Pillow, 1977 (Delmark) reissue of 1951 and 1952 United recordings
- Prowling with the Nighthawk (Document), 26 sides recorded for Bluebird, Decca, Aristocrat, and United from 1937 to 1952, including "My Sweet Lovin' Woman" (which he wrote under his given name, Robert McCollum)
- Ramblin' Bob (Saga), 24 tracks recorded for Victor, Decca, Chess, and United from 1937 to 1952
- Live on Maxwell Street (1964), as Robert Nighthawk and His Flames of Rhythm (reissued by Rounder Records, 1980, 1991; some versions include an extended interview with Nighthawk)
- The Aristocrat of the Blues, MCA/Chess CHD2-9387
- Sweet Black Angel (And More Chicago Blues), Jasmine JASMCD-3164

== Sources and external links ==
- "Bricks in My Pillow" – The Robert Nighthawk Story
- Jean Buzelin, liner notes to Ramblin' Bob (Saga Blues, 2004)
- Joel Snow,
- Jeff Harris, "Bricks in My Pillow: The Robert Nighthawk Story", Big Road Blues Show, nighthawk.sundayblues.org. Accessed November 17, 2022.
- Robert Nighthawk discography at Discogs
- Robert Nighthawk at IMDb
