= KRZP =

- Gassville, Arkansas; United States
- Broadcast area: Mountain Home, Arkansas, Norfork, Arkansas
- Frequency: 92.7 MHz
- Branding: Hot Country

Programming
- Format: Country

Ownership
- Owner: High Plains Radio Network, LLC
- Operator: E Radio Network, LLC
- Sister stations: KCMC-FM, KJMT

History
- First air date: 2011 (as KYMT)
- Former call signs: KYMT (2011–2015)

Technical information
- Licensing authority: FCC
- Facility ID: 189491
- Class: A
- ERP: 3,100 watts
- HAAT: 142 metres (466 ft)
- Transmitter coordinates: 36°20′36.7″N 92°25′31.0″W

Links
- Public license information: Public file; LMS

KRZP (92.7 FM) is a radio station licensed to the city of Gassville, Arkansas. It is owned by High Plains Radio Network, LLC and operated by E Radio Network, LLC.

The station airs a country music format and is known as "Hot Country".

On March 31, 2023, KRZP changed its format from classic country to talk, branded as "Mountain Talk 92.7" (format moved from KJMT 97.1 FM Calico Rock, which went silent).
