= Willie Love =

American Delta blues pianist (1906–1953)

- Born: Willie Love Jr. November 4, 1906; Duncan, Mississippi, United States
- Died: August 19, 1953 (aged 46) Jackson, Mississippi, United States
- Genres: Delta blues, boogie-woogie, rhythm and blues
- Occupations: Pianist, singer, songwriter
- Instruments: Piano, vocals
- Years active: Early 1940s–1953
- Label: Trumpet

Willie Love Jr. (November 4, 1906 – August 19, 1953) was an American Delta blues pianist. He is best known for his association with and accompaniment of Sonny Boy Williamson II.

== Biography ==
Love was born in Duncan, Mississippi. In 1942, he met Sonny Boy Williamson II in Greenville, Mississippi. They played regularly together at juke joints throughout the Mississippi Delta. Love was influenced by the piano playing of Leroy Carr and was adept at both standard blues and boogie-woogie styling.

In 1947 Charley Booker moved to Greenville, where he worked with Love. Two years later, Oliver Sain also relocated to Greenville to join his stepfather, Love, as the drummer in a band fronted by Williamson. When Williamson recorded for Trumpet Records in March 1951, Love played the piano on the recordings. Trumpet's owner, Lillian McMurray, had Love return the following month and again in July 1951, when he recorded his best-known song, "Everybody's Fishing", which he wrote. Love played piano and sang, with guitar accompaniment by Elmore James and Joe Willie Wilkins. His backing band was known as the Three Aces. A studio session in December 1951 had Love backed by Little Milton (guitar), T.J. Green (fiddle), and Junior Blackman (drums). In his teenage years, Eddie Shaw played tenor saxophone with both Milton and Love.

Under his own name, Love did not return to the studio until March 1953, when he cut "Worried Blues" and "Lonesome World Blues." Despite the friendship between them, Love did not utilise Williamson's playing on any of his own material. In April 1953, Love and Williamson recorded in Houston, Texas, in Love's final recording session.

All of Love's recordings under his own name appeared on the compilation album Greenville Smokin', issued in 2000.

After suffering the effects of years of heavy drinking, Love died of bronchopneumonia, in August 1953, at the age of 46. In 2017 the Killer Blues Headstone Project placed the headstone for Willie Love at Elmwood Cemetery in Jackson, Mississippi.

== Discography ==
=== Compilation albums ===
- Shout Brother Shout (1983)
- Clownin' With The World (1989)
- Delta Blues - 1951 (1990)
- Trumpet Masters, Vol. 1: Lonesome World Blues (1991)
- Greenville Smokin' (2000)

== See also ==
- List of Delta blues musicians
- KWAM § Early years
