= KFFA (AM) =

- Helena, Arkansas; United States
- Frequency: 1360 kHz
- Branding: KFFA AM 1360

Programming
- Format: Country

Ownership
- Owner: Monte Spearman and Gentry Todd Spearman; (Spearman Land and Development)
- Sister stations: KCMC-FM, KFFA-FM, KJMT, KRZP

History
- First air date: November 1941

Technical information
- Licensing authority: FCC
- Facility ID: 16520
- Class: D
- Power: 1,000 watts (day); 90 watts (night)
- Transmitter coordinates: 34°31′39″N 90°37′48″W

Links
- Public license information: Public file; LMS
- Website: www.hpr.network/radio-station-portfolio

KFFA (1360 AM) is an American radio station licensed by the FCC to serve the community of Helena, Arkansas. The station is owned by Monte Spearman and Gentry Todd Spearman, through licensee Spearman Land and Development.

== Historical role ==
In November 1941, Helena's first radio station KFFA went on the air. Station Manager and part owner Sam Anderson offered to sell a block of time to a group of blues musicians on the condition that they obtain a sponsor. Max Moore, owner of Interstate Grocer Company, which distributed King Biscuit Flour, agreed to sponsor the show — thus was born King Biscuit Entertainers and the beginning of King Biscuit Time.

The program was first broadcast on November 21, 1941, and featured blues artists Sonny Boy Williamson and Robert Lockwood, Jr. playing live in the studio. Other musicians who played on the show included pianist Pinetop Perkins and guitarist Robert Nighthawk. Musicians such as guitarist Hound Dog Taylor would stop by for occasional appearances.

These KFFA broadcasts, heard in the hometowns of Nighthawk, Lockwood, and Sonny Boy, were a draw to young southern blues artists who came to Helena to hang around and learn. Jimmy Rogers and Little Walter, later central to the sound of the Muddy Waters band, were among them. Levon Helm, drummer and vocalist for Ronnie Hawkins and The Band, grew up outside Helena in Turkey Scratch. He frequently went into town to watch as the show was broadcast.

The KFFA studios were on the second floor of the Floyd Truck Lines building, a rickety old structure. The program was broadcast from there for 20 years until the building was condemned and the studio moved to modern quarters on the top floor of the Helena National Bank Building.

The show opens with the announcer's, "Sunshine" Sonny Payne's, words, (dinner bell clang) "Pass the biscuits, 'cause it's King Biscuit Time!"

With more than 17,000 broadcasts, this show has influenced several generations of blues, rock, and pop musicians.

Terry Mross, American actor best known for his role in Dazed and Confused, worked at KFFA in the early 1970s and was a frequent guest host of King Biscuit Time when substituting for permanent host "Sunshine" Sonny Payne.

The program is broadcast weekdays at 12:15 PM local time and recordings of the show are available for download from the internet at the station's web site.

== See also ==
- KFFA-FM
