= Sonny Boy Williamson II =

American blues musician (1912–1965)

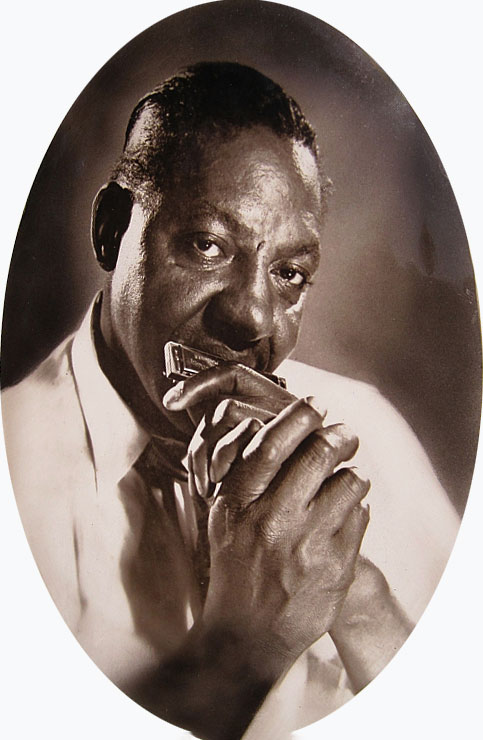

Background information
- Also known as: "Rice" Miller; Little Boy Blue; Little Willie; "Sonny Boy" Williamson
- Born: Alex (or Aleck) Ford (later known as Aleck Miller); December 5, between 1897–1912 (Note: See the "Early days" section); Greenwood or Money, Mississippi, U.S.
- Died: May 24, 1965 (aged 52–68) Helena, Arkansas, U.S.
- Genre: Blues
- Occupations: Musician; songwriter
- Instruments: Vocals; harmonica
- Years active: Mid-1930s–1965
- Labels: Trumpet; Checker

Alex or Aleck Miller (originally Ford, possibly December 5, 1912 – May 24, 1965), known later in his career as Sonny Boy Williamson, was an American blues harmonica player, singer and songwriter. He was an early and influential blues harp stylist who recorded successfully in the 1950s and 1960s. Miller used various names, including Rice Miller and Little Boy Blue, before calling himself Sonny Boy Williamson, which was also the name of a popular Chicago blues singer and harmonica player. To distinguish the two, Miller has been referred to as Sonny Boy Williamson II.

He first recorded with Elmore James on "Dust My Broom". Some of his popular songs include "Don't Start Me Talkin'", "Help Me", "Checkin' Up on My Baby", and "Bring It On Home". He toured Europe with the American Folk Blues Festival and recorded with English rock musicians, including the Yardbirds and Animals. "Help Me" became a blues standard, and many blues and rock artists have recorded his songs.

== Biography ==
=== Early days ===
Miller's date and place of birth are disputed. There are various opinions about his year of birth, five of which are 1897, 1899, 1908, 1909, and 1912. According to David Evans, professor of music and an ethnomusicologist at the University of Memphis, census records indicate that Miller was born in about 1912, being seven years old on February 2, 1920, the day of the census. Miller's gravestone at Tutwiler, Mississippi, set up by record company owner Lillian McMurry twelve years after his death, gives his date of birth as March 11, 1908. In a spoken word performance called “The Story of Sonny Boy Williamson” that was later included in several compilations, Miller states that he was born in Glendora, Mississippi in 1897. According to researchers Bob Eagle and Eric S. LeBlanc, he was born in the small community of Money, near Greenwood, Mississippi, in 1912.

He lived and worked with his sharecropper stepfather, Jim Miller, whose last name he soon adopted, and mother, Millie Ford, until the early 1930s. Beginning in the 1930s, he traveled around Mississippi and Arkansas and encountered Big Joe Williams, Elmore James and Robert Lockwood Jr., also known as Robert Junior Lockwood, who would play guitar on his later Checker Records sides. He was also associated with Robert Johnson during this period. Miller developed his style and raffish stage persona during these years. Willie Dixon recalled seeing Lockwood and Miller playing for tips in Greenville, Mississippi, in the 1930s. He entertained audiences with novelties such as inserting one end of the harmonica into his mouth and playing with no hands. At this time he was often known as "Rice" Miller—a childhood nickname stemming from his love of rice and milk—or as "Little Boy Blue".

In 1941, Miller was hired to play the King Biscuit Time show, advertising the King Biscuit brand of baking flour on radio station KFFA in Helena, Arkansas, with Lockwood. The program's sponsor, Max Moore, began billing Miller as Sonny Boy Williamson, apparently in an attempt to capitalize on the fame of the well-known Chicago-based harmonica player and singer Sonny Boy Williamson (birth name John Lee Curtis Williamson, died 1948). Although John Lee Williamson was a major blues star who had already released dozens of successful and widely influential records under the name "Sonny Boy Williamson" from 1937 onward, Miller would later claim to have been the first to use the name. Some blues scholars believe that Miller's assertion he was born in 1899 was a ruse to convince audiences he was old enough to have used the name before John Lee Williamson, who was born in 1914.

While in Clarksdale, Williamson stayed at the Riverside Hotel. A 13-year-old Ike Turner backed Williamson on piano during local gigs.

=== Radio show in West Memphis ===
In 1949, Williamson relocated to West Memphis, Arkansas, and lived with Howlin' Wolf. (Later, for Checker Records, he did a parody of Howlin' Wolf, entitled "Like Wolf".) He started his own KWEM radio show from 1948 to 1950, selling the elixir Hadacol. He brought his King Biscuit musician friends to West Memphis—Elmore James, Houston Stackhouse, Arthur "Big Boy" Crudup, Robert Nighthawk, and others—to perform on KWEM radio. Williamson married Howlin' Wolf's half-sister Maggy and he showed Wolf how to play harmonica.

=== Recording career ===
Williamson's first recording session took place in 1951 for Lillian McMurry of Trumpet Records, based in Jackson, Mississippi. It was three years since the death of John Lee Williamson, which for the first time allowed some legitimacy to Miller's carefully worded claim to being "the one and only Sonny Boy Williamson". When Trumpet went bankrupt in 1955, Williamson's recording contract was yielded to its creditors, who sold it to Chess Records in Chicago. He had begun developing a following in Chicago beginning in 1953, when he appeared there as a member of Elmore James's band. During his Chess years he enjoyed his greatest success and acclaim, recording about 70 songs for the Chess subsidiary Checker Records from 1955 to 1964. His first LP record was a compilation of previously released singles. Titled Down and Out Blues, Checker released the collection in 1959. A single, "Boppin' with Sonny" backed with "No Nights by Myself", was released by Ace Records in 1955.

In 1972, Chess released This Is My Story, a compilation album featuring Williamson's recordings for the label. It was later included in Robert Christgau's "basic record library" of 1950s and 1960s recordings, published in Christgau's Record Guide: Rock Albums of the Seventies (1981).

=== 1960s European tours ===
In the early 1960s he toured Europe several times during the height of the British blues craze, backed on a number of occasions by the Authentics (see American Folk Blues Festival), recording with the Yardbirds (for the album Sonny Boy Williamson and the Yardbirds) and the Animals, and appearing on several television broadcasts throughout Europe. Around this time he was quoted as saying of the backing bands who accompanied him, "those British boys want to play the blues real bad, and they do". In 1963 while in London, on one or possibly more occasions he recorded 2 songs in front of a live television audience for the UK regional television folk and blues music series Hullabaloo, presented by the Scottish folksinger Rory McEwen; these sessions were released on DVD in 2020.

Sonny Boy took a liking to the European fans, and while there had a custom-made, two-tone suit tailored personally for him, along with a bowler hat, matching umbrella, and an attaché case for his harmonicas. He appears credited as "Big Skol" on Roland Kirk's live album Kirk in Copenhagen (1963).

=== Death ===
Upon his return to the U.S., he resumed playing the King Biscuit Time show on KFFA, and performed in the Helena, Arkansas area. As fellow musicians Houston Stackhouse and Peck Curtis waited at the KFFA studios for Williamson on May 25, 1965, the 12:15 broadcast time was approaching and Williamson was nowhere in sight. Peck left the radio station to locate Williamson, and discovered his body in bed at the rooming house where he had been staying, dead of an apparent heart attack suffered in his sleep the night before. Williamson is buried just outside Tutwiler, Mississippi at the site of the former Whitfield Baptist Church Cemetery on Prairie Place road. Trumpet Records owner McMurry provided the headstone with an incorrect date of death.

== Naming ==
The recordings made by John Lee Williamson between 1937 and his death in 1948 and those made between 1951 and 1964 by "Rice" Miller were all originally issued under the name Sonny Boy Williamson. It is believed that Miller adopted the name to suggest to audiences (and to his first record label) that he was the "original" Sonny Boy. To differentiate between the two musicians, scholars and biographers have referred to John Lee Williamson (1914–1948) as "Sonny Boy Williamson I" or "the original Sonny Boy" and to Miller (circa 1912–1965) as "Sonny Boy Williamson II".

== Legacy ==
In 2014, Williamson was honored with a marker on the Mississippi Blues Trail in Helena, Arkansas.

== Discography ==
=== Albums ===
- Down and Out Blues (Chess, 1959)
- A Portrait in Blues (Storyville, 1963)
- The Blues of Sonny Boy Williamson (Storyville, 1963)
- Sonny Boy Williamson and Memphis Slim (Disques Vogue, 1964)
- Sonny Boy Williamson and the Yardbirds (Fontana TL-5277, 1965)
- The Real Folk Blues (Chess, 1957-64 [1966])
- More Real Folk Blues (Chess, 1967)
- Don't Send Me No Flowers (Marmalade, 1965 [1968]) with Brian Auger, Jimmy Page
- Bummer Road (Chess, 1969)
- King Biscuit Time (Arhoolie, 1970)
- Sonny Boy Williamson and the Animals (Faces & Places, Vol. 2) (BYG 529.902, 1972)
- One Way Out (Chess, 1975)

=== Singles and EPs ===
- "Eyesight to the Blind" / "Crazy About You Baby" (Trumpet 129, 2/51)
- "Do It if You Wanta" / "Cool, Cool Blues" (Trumpet 139, 9/51)
- "Sonny Boy's Christmas Blues" / "Pontiac Blues" (Trumpet 145, 11/51)
- "Stop Crying" / "Come on Back Home" (Trumpet 140, 3/52) as 'Sonny Boy Williamson, His Harmonica and House Rockers'
- "Stop Now Baby" / "Mr. Downchild" (Trumpet 168, 8/52) as 'Sonny Boy Williamson, His Harmonica and House Rockers'
- "Nine Below Zero" / "Mighty Long Time" (Trumpet 166, 2/53)
- "I Cross My Heart" / "West Memphis Blues" (Trumpet 144, 8/53) as 'Sonny Boy Williamson, His Harmonica and House Rockers'
- "Too Close Together" / "Cat Hop" (Trumpet 212, 12/53)
- "Going in Your Direction" / "Red Hot Kisses" (Trumpet 216, 4/54)
- "She Brought Life Back to the Dead" / "Gettin' Out of Town" (Trumpet 215, 7/54)
- "From the Bottom" / "Empty Bedroom" (Trumpet 228, 2/55)
- "No Nights by Myself" / "Boppin' with Sonny" (Ace 511, 1955)
- "Don't Start Me Talkin'"/ "All My Love in Vain" (Checker 824, 1955)
- "Let Me Explain" / "Your Imagination" (Checker 834, 1956)
- "Keep It to Yourself" / "The Key (To Your Door)" (Checker 847, 1956)
- "Fattening Frogs for Snakes" / "I Don't Know" (Checker 864, 1957)
- "Born Blind" / "Ninety-Nine" (Checker 883, 1958)
- "Your Funeral and My Trial" / "Wake Up, Baby" (Checker 894, 1958)
- "Cross My Heart" / "Dissatisfied" (Checker 910, 1958)
- "Let Your Conscience Be Your Guide" / "Unseeing Eye" (Checker 927, 1959)
- "The Goat" / "It's Sad to Be Alone" (Checker 943, 1960)
- "Lonesome Cabin" / "Temperature 110" (Checker 956, 1960)
- "Trust My Baby" / "Too Close Together" (Checker 963, 1960)
- "Stop Right Now" / "The Hunt" (Checker 975, 1961)
- "The Hunt" / "Little Village" (Checker 975, 1961) re-release
- "One Way Out" / "Nine Below Zero" (Checker 1003, 1962)
- "Help Me" / "Bye Bye Bird" (Checker 1036, 1963)
- "Trying to Get Back on My Feet" / "Decoration Day" (Checker 1065, 1963)
- "I Want You Close to Me" / "My Younger Days" (Checker 1080, 1964)
- "Bring It On Home" / "Down Child" (Checker 1134, 1966)
- "Baby Let Me Come Back Home" / "November Boogie" / "All Nite Boogie" / "Leavin' Blues" [EP] (Collectors Special [Denmark] Records CS-100, 1966)
- "From the Bottom" / "Empty Bedroom" (Blue Horizon [UK] Records 1008, 1967) as 'Sonny Boy Williamson and His Houserockers'

=== Compilations ===
- In Memoriam (1965, reissued as The Real Folk Blues, 1966)
- Blues Classics by 'The Original' Sonny Boy Williamson (1965)
- This Is My Story (1972, reissued as Chess Blues Masters: Sonny Boy Williamson, 1976) 2-LP
- King Biscuit Time (1989) [the first 5 Trumpet singles, plus 5 more tracks recorded in 1951]
- The Essential Sonny Boy Williamson (Chess/MCA, 1993) 2-CD
- His Best (Chess/MCA, 1997)
- On various Youtube videos from live European performances

=== As Sonny Boy Williamson, His Harmonica and Houserockers ===
Singles

- "Stop Crying" / "Come on Back Home" (Trumpet, 1952)
- "Stop Now Baby" / "Mr. Downchild" (Trumpet, 1952)
- "I Cross My Heart" / "West Memphis Blues" (Trumpet, 1953)
- "From the Bottom" / "Empty Bedroom" (Blue Horizon, 1967)
