= Trumpet Records =

American blues/gospel/R&B record label

- Type: Incentive
- Industry: Record label
- Founded: 1951; Jackson, Mississippi
- Founder: Lillian McMurry
- Headquarters: United States

Trumpet Records was an American record company founded by Lillian McMurry in Jackson, Mississippi, in 1951. Although it existed for only four years, it was influential.

== History ==
Trumpet was the first label to record Sonny Boy Williamson II.

The goal of Trumpet Records was to record musicians from the Mississippi Delta that did not have access to recording studios in New York City or Los Angeles. Trumpet competed with the Bihari brothers of Modern Records. Both companies recorded some of the era's best blues music, from ballads to jump blues and boogie-woogie. Elmore James recorded his original "Dust My Broom" here, and the label was the first to record Sonny Boy Williamson II.

Trumpet was founded by Lillian McMurry. Her husband, Willard, was in the furniture sales business, and they purchased a hardware store which they were renovating to be a furniture store. The workers were playing some unsold records left behind and one caught Lillian's attention: Wynonie Harris's "All She Wants to Do is Rock". "It was the most unusual, sincere and solid sound I'd ever heard", she said. "I'd never heard a black record before. I'd never heard anything with such rhythm and freedom." McMurray wanted to sell records in the store (which at the time were sold everywhere from grocery stores to beauty parlors) and had the workers make up a list of records to buy. When the store opened, she quickly sold out of all those records and asked Willard if they could turn part of the store into a record store (which would be called Record Mart).

Trumpet was located on Farish Street, the black district of Jackson, and recorded R&B, gospel, and blues artists including Little Milton, Wynonie Harris, Willie Love, and James Waller. Arthur Crudup recorded at the label under the name Elmer James. In 1952, James's song "Dust My Broom" appeared on Billboard's R&B chart at No. 9. Talent scout Joe Bihari found him at the radio shop to record him at a local night club backing up Ike Turner. McMurry and the Bihari brothers ended up in a multi-year legal dispute when the Biharis tried to sign artists who had exclusive agreements with Trumpet. The case made major publications and, in 1954, a judge ruled in favor of McMurray.

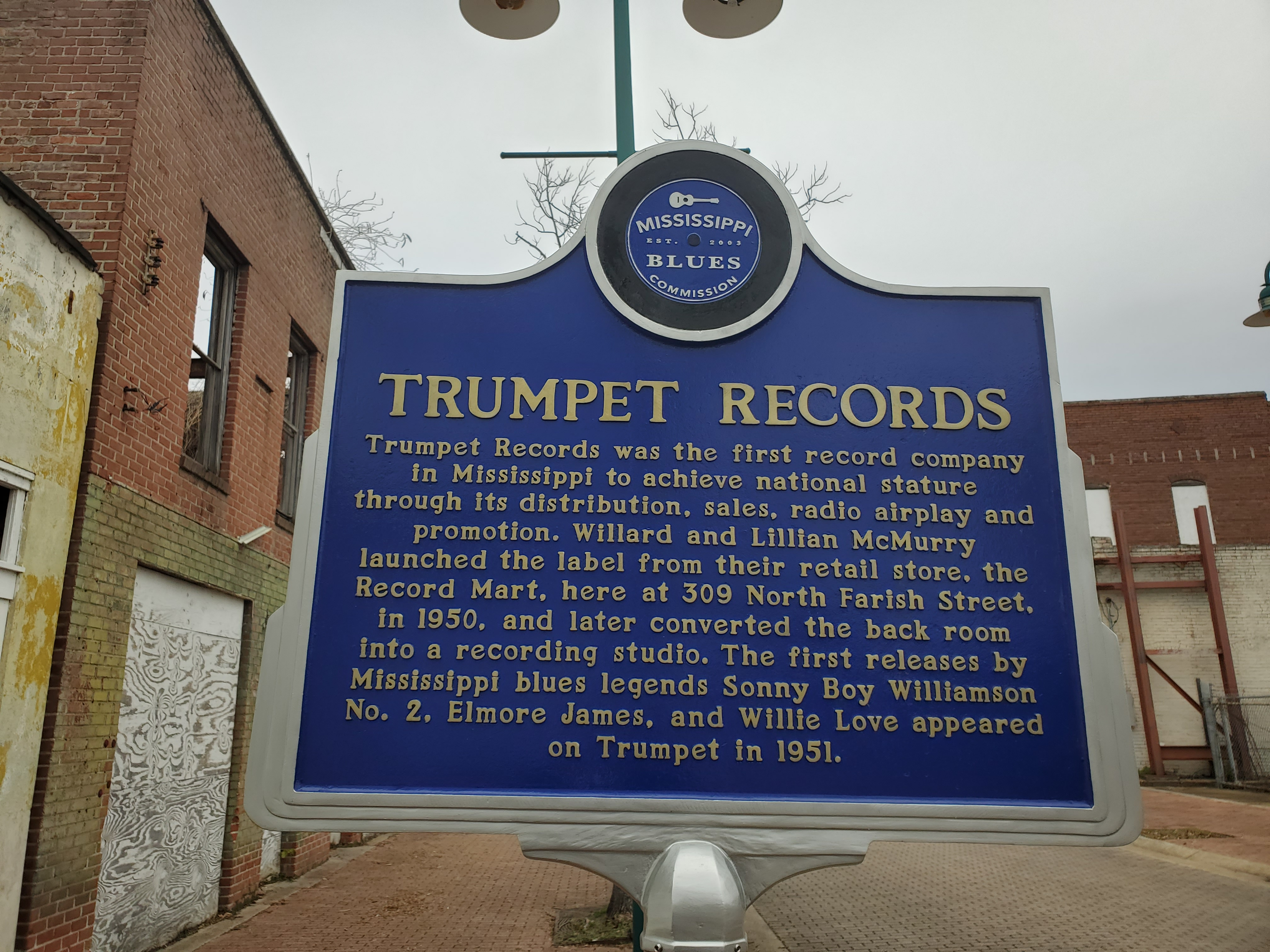
The site of Trumpet Records on Farish Street, Jackson, Mississippi, commemorated on the Mississippi Blues Trail

Trumpet artists recorded at studios such as WRBC Radio's studio, Ivan Scott's Radio Service Studio in Jackson, and some historic studios of the day (such as Bill Holford's ACA Studios in Houston, Memphis Record Service with Sam Phillips, RCA Victor Studio in Chicago, and Universal Recording in Chicago). In 1953, Record Mart was remodeled to be a recording studio, Diamond Recording Studio, designed by Bill Holford. McMurray engineered based on what she learned by observing and listening to other engineers.

Williamson wrote about McMurray in two songs: "Pontiac Blues", about her car, and "309", named for her address. In the lyrics, he gave out her home phone number.

Trumpet closed in 1956. Creditors sold the artists' recording contracts. Sonny Boy Williamson II then recorded for Chess Records in Chicago, where he released another 70 songs.

The site of the Trumpet Records's studio is commemorated by a Mississippi Blues Trail historical marker.

== See also ==
- List of record labels
