= Noalmark Broadcasting Corporation =

American radio network

- Company type: Private
- Industry: Broadcast
- Founded: 1970
- Founder: William C. Nolan Jr.; Edwin B. Alderson Jr.; Russell Marks
- Headquarters: El Dorado, Arkansas
- Key people: William C. Nolan, III President and CEO; Diane N. Landen Executive vice president and Chairman of the Board; Anna M. Canterbury Senior vice president and CFO; Jeffrey W. Nolan Secretary

Noalmark Broadcasting Corporation is a radio and media company based in El Dorado, Arkansas. Founded by William C. Nolan Jr., Edwin B. Alderson Jr. and El Dorado car dealer Russell Marks (all deceased) in 1970, it owns radio stations in Arkansas and New Mexico.

== Background ==
=== Arkansas ===
KIXB, KMRX, KAGL, KELD (AM), KELD-FM, KLBQ (FM), KDMS, and KMLK, which are all operated out of their studios in El Dorado, Arkansas. 870-863-6126

Prior to June 1, 2016, Noalmark Broadcasting owned KBHS, KYRC, KHRK, and KLAZ in the Hot Springs, Arkansas, market.

KVMA and KVMZ, which are all operated out of their studios in Magnolia, Arkansas.

In May 2007, Noalmark Broadcasting entered into an agreement to purchase Clark County Broadcasting in Arkadelphia. This group of stations includes KYXK, KDEL, and KVRC

Prior to the purchase of these stations, Noalmark received a construction permit in the FCC Auction 70 to build a new Class A FM radio station on the 93.5 MHz frequency. This became 93.5 Bismarck in the Hot Springs, Arkansas market.

In that same auction, Noalmark received a construction permit to build another Class A FM radio station on the 92.7 MHz frequency KIXC in Bearden, Arkansas. This radio station will serve the Camden, Hampton, and Fordyce communities.

=== New Mexico ===
KIXN, KZOR, KEJL, KLEA-FM, KPZA-FM, are all operated in Hobbs, New Mexico, studios.

In January 2008, Noalmark took control of heritage stations KBIM and KBIM-FM in Roswell, New Mexico. KBIM and KBIM-FM operate on 910 AM and 94.9 FM.

== Noalmark stations ==
=== AM stations ===
Branding	Callsign	Frequency	Power	Market
1400 News / Sports / Talk	KELD	1400 kHz	1 kW	El Dorado, Arkansas
1290 KDMS	KDMS	1290 kHz	2.5 kW (day); 106 W (night)	El Dorado, Arkansas
Fox Sports 107.1 FM / 630AM	KVMA	630 kHz	1 kW (day); 30 W (night)	Waldo, Arkansas
Eagle 100.5	KEJL	1110 kHz	5 kW (day); 2.5 kW (critical)	Hobbs, New Mexico
La Ley 93.7	KBIM	910 kHz	5 kW (day); 34 W (night)	Roswell, New Mexico

=== FM stations ===
Branding	Callsign	Frequency	ERP	Market
KIX 103	KIXB	103.3 MHz	100 kW	El Dorado, Arkansas
Big 96.1	KMRX	96.1 MHz	100 kW	El Dorado, Arkansas
The Eagle 93	KAGL	93.3 MHz	18 kW	El Dorado, Arkansas
99.1 & 106.5 Max FM	KELD	106.5 MHz	17.5 kW	El Dorado, Arkansas
101.5 The Hog	KLBQ	101.5 MHz	4.5 kW	El Dorado, Arkansas
The Soul of the City	KMLK	98.7 MHz	14 kW	El Dorado, Arkansas
99.1 & 106.5 Max FM	KVMZ	99.1 MHz	4.1 kW	Waldo, Arkansas
KIX 103	KIXN	102.9 MHz	100 kW	Hobbs, New Mexico
Z94	KZOR	94.1 MHz	100 kW	Hobbs, New Mexico
Eagle 100.5	K263AZ/KEJL	100.5 MHz 1110 kHz	500 W	Hobbs, New Mexico
La Zeta 103.7	KPZA	103.7 MHz	100 kW	Hobbs, New Mexico
Kool 95.7	KLEA	95.7 MHz	25 kW	Hobbs, New Mexico
La Ley 93.7	K229BV	93.7 MHz	500 W	Roswell, New Mexico
94.9 the Country Giant	KBIM	93.7 MHz	100 kW	Roswell, New Mexico
