= KZHS =

Radio station in Hot Springs, Arkansas (1951–2014)

Hot Springs, Arkansas; United States
- Frequency: 590 kHz

Programming
- Format: Defunct (formerly Sports Talk)
- Affiliations: Fox Sports Radio

Ownership
- Owner: Federal Communications Commission
- Sister stations: KZYP (1951–2014), KBHS (1988–2014), KPWA (2009–2014), KLBL (1991–2014), K288FP (2004–2014), KLAZ (1977–2014)

History
- First air date: 1951
- Last air date: February 7, 2014
- Former call signs: KBHS (1951–2005); KSPA FM; KPZA (2005–2008)

Technical information
- Facility ID: 29295
- Class: D
- Power: 5000 watts (day); 67 watts (night)
- Transmitter coordinates: 34°29′55″N 92°58′45″W

KZHS (590 AM) was a radio station broadcasting a Sports Talk format. Formerly licensed to Hot Springs, Arkansas, United States, it served the Hot Springs area. It had a daytime broadcast radius of roughly 300 miles. Prior to being a sports station, it was known as Spanish-language KZPA until November 2008. The station was owned by Noalmark Broadcasting Corporation.

Noalmark surrendered the license for KZHS to the Federal Communications Commission (FCC) on February 7, 2014, who subsequently cancelled it.
