= KCCE (AM) =

KHCB Christian radio station in San Angelo, Texas

San Angelo, Texas; United States
- Frequency: 1340 kHz
- Branding: Radio Amistad

Programming
- Language: Spanish
- Format: Christian

Ownership
- Owner: Houston Christian Broadcasters, Inc.
- Sister stations: KHCB (AM), KHCH, KTKC (AM), KHKV, KHCU (FM), KMAT, KJDS

History
- Former call signs: KTXL (1947–1961); KTEO (1961–1989); KOJO (1989); KTEO (1989–1991); KCRN (1991–2018)

Technical information
- Licensing authority: FCC
- Facility ID: 14514
- Class: C
- Power: 1,000 watts (unlimited)
- Transmitter coordinates: 31°28′43″N 100°27′50″W

Links
- Public license information: Public file; LMS
- Website: radioamistad.net

KCCE (1340 AM) is an American radio station licensed to serve the community of San Angelo, Texas. The station's broadcast license is held by Houston Christian Broadcasters, Inc.

KCCE broadcasts a Christian radio format to the greater San Angelo, Texas, area.

The station was assigned the call sign "KCRN" by the U.S. Federal Communications Commission (FCC) on September 9, 1991. The station changed its call sign to KCCE on September 7, 2018.

== Translators ==
| Call sign | Frequency | City of license | FID | ERP (W) | HAAT | Class | FCC info |
|---|---|---|---|---|---|---|---|
| K232FG | 94.3 MHz FM | San Angelo, Texas | 139486 | 250 | 56 m (184 ft) | D | LMS |
