= KZYP (AM) =

- Malvern, Arkansas; United States
- Broadcast area: Hot Springs, Arkansas
- Frequency: 1310 kHz
- Branding: EZ Rock

Programming
- Format: Silent: was Classic hits

Ownership
- Owner: High Plains Radio Network, LLC
- Operator: E Radio Network, LLC
- Sister stations: KAFN, KASZ, KCAT, KCMC-FM, KDEL-FM, KLRG, KVRC, KWPS-FM, KYXK

History
- First air date: August 1951 (as KBOK)
- Former call signs: KBOK (1951–2014)

Technical information
- Licensing authority: FCC
- Facility ID: 39750
- Class: D
- Power: 1,000 watts day
- Transmitter coordinates: 34°22′25″N 92°49′52″W
- Translator: 99.3 K257HA (Sheridan)

Links
- Public license information: Public file; LMS

KZYP (1310 kHz) was an AM radio station licensed to serve Malvern, Arkansas, United States. The station, which began broadcasting in 1951, last owned by High Plains Radio Network, LLC. It was owned by Noalmark Broadcasting Corporation until 2014.

Until 2015, KBOK/KZYP broadcast a classic country format. After losing ratings to US Stations, LLC's 104.5 The Bull, KZYP changed their format to regional Mexican. On July 7, 2016, KZYP went silent. On February 13, 2017, KZYP went back on the air with a sports radio format. On April 29, 2017, KZYP went silent again.

The station was assigned the KBOK call sign by the Federal Communications Commission. The station changed to the current KZYP call sign on June 1, 2014.
