= KMAT =

- Seadrift, Texas; United States
- Broadcast area: Port Lavaca, Texas; Palacios, Texas
- Frequency: 105.1 MHz

Programming
- Languages: Spanish; Vietnamese; Cantonese; Mandarin
- Format: Ethnic Christian Radio

Ownership
- Owner: Cordell Communications, Inc.
- Sister stations: KHCB, KHCH, KTKC, KHKV, KCCE, KHCU, KJDS

History
- First air date: August 18, 1999

Technical information
- Licensing authority: FCC
- Facility ID: 72527
- Class: C2
- ERP: 50,000 watts
- HAAT: 139 meters (456 ft)
- Transmitter coordinates: 28°26′17″N 96°26′55″W

Links
- Public license information: Public file; LMS

KMAT is an Ethnic Christian radio station licensed to Seadrift, Texas, broadcasting on 105.1 FM. KMAT broadcasts in the languages of Spanish, Vietnamese, Cantonese, and Mandarin, and is owned by Cordell Communications, Inc.
