= KHKV =

KHCB radio station in Kerrville, Texas

- Kerrville, Texas; United States
- Broadcast area: Kerrville-Fredericksburg
- Frequency: 91.1 MHz

Programming
- Format: Spanish religious

Ownership
- Owner: Houston Christian Broadcasters, Inc.
- Sister stations: KHCB (AM), KHCH, KTKC (AM), KCCE (AM), KHCU (FM), KMAT, KJDS

History
- Former call signs: KBBP (1998–1998); KKER (1998–2002)

Technical information
- Licensing authority: FCC
- Facility ID: 83433
- Class: A
- ERP: 300 watts
- HAAT: 63.0 meters (206.7 ft)
- Transmitter coordinates: 30°2′37″N 99°7′17″W

Links
- Public license information: Public file; LMS
- Website: https://www.radioamistad.net/web/

KHKV (91.1 FM) is a radio station broadcasting a Spanish religious radio format. Licensed to Kerrville, Texas, United States, the station serves the Kerrville-Fredericksburg area. The station is currently owned by Houston Christian Broadcasters, Inc.

== History ==
The station was assigned the call letters KBBP on February 20, 1998. On April 6, 1998, the station changed its call sign to KKER, on February 1, 2002 to the current KHKV, On January 4, 2001 the station was sold to Houston Christian Broadcasters, Inc.

== Translators ==
Call sign	Frequency	City of license	FID	ERP (W)	HAAT	Class	FCC info
K272FJ	(102.3 MHz) FM	Kerrville, Texas	144459	92	38 m (125 ft)	D	LMS
K228FG	(93.5 MHz) FM	Kerrville, Texas	142497	92	38 m (125 ft)	D	LMS
