= KHRK =

KHRK may refer to:

- KHRK (FM), a radio station (97.7 FM) licensed to serve Hennessey, Oklahoma, United States
- KJDS, a radio station (101.9 FM) licensed to serve Mountain Pine, Arkansas, United States, which held the call sign KHRK-FM from 2016 to 2017
- KLBL, a radio station (101.5 FM) licensed to serve Malvern, Arkansas, which held the call sign KHRK from 2013 to 2016
- KPWA, a radio station (93.5 FM) licensed to serve Bismarck, Arkansas, which held the call sign KHRK from 2011 to 2013
