= KWPS-FM =

Radio station in Caddo Valley, Arkansas

- Caddo Valley, Arkansas; United States
- Broadcast area: Hot Springs, Arkansas; Arkadelphia, Arkansas
- Frequency: 99.7 MHz
- Branding: Arkansas Rocks 99.7

Programming
- Format: Classic rock
- Affiliations: Arkansas Rocks Radio Network

Ownership
- Owner: Broadcast Industry Group, LLC
- Sister stations: KAFN, KASZ, KCAT, KCMC-FM, KDEL-FM, KLRG, KVRC, KYXK, KZYP

History
- First air date: February 6, 2013 (as KHCV)
- Former call signs: KHCV (2/2013-8/2013)
- Call sign meaning: K Woo Pig Sooie

Technical information
- Licensing authority: FCC
- Facility ID: 183370
- Class: A
- ERP: 980 watts
- HAAT: 246.6 meters (809 ft)
- Transmitter coordinates: 34°21′09″N 93°09′27″W

Links
- Public license information: Public file; LMS

KWPS-FM (99.7 MHz) is a radio station broadcasting a classic rock format. Licensed to Caddo Valley, Arkansas, United States, it serves the Arkadelphia, Arkansas area. The station is currently owned and operated by Broadcast Industry Group, LLC.
