= KPWA =

- Bismarck, Arkansas; United States
- Broadcast area: Hot Springs, Arkansas
- Frequency: 93.5 MHz
- Branding: Keeping Him Close By

Programming
- Format: Christian radio (KHCB simulcast)

Ownership
- Owner: Houston Christian Broadcasters
- Sister stations: KZHS (2009–2014), KZYP (2009–2014), KBHS (2009–2016), KLBL (2009–2016), KJDS (2016–present), KHHS (2016–present), K288FP (2009–2016), KLAZ (2009–2016)

History
- First air date: 2009 (as KIXV)
- Former call signs: KIXV (3/2009-10/2009); KLEZ (2009–2011); KHRK (2011–2013); KIXV (2013–2014); KYRC (2014–2017)

Technical information
- Licensing authority: FCC
- Facility ID: 170989
- Class: C3
- ERP: 11,500 watts
- HAAT: 147 meters (482 ft)
- Transmitter coordinates: 34°13′52.4″N 93°16′46.3″W

Links
- Public license information: Public file; LMS
- Webcast: Listen Live
- Website: khcb.org

KPWA (93.5 FM) is an American radio station broadcasting a Christian radio format. Licensed to Bismarck, Arkansas, United States, the station is currently owned by Houston Christian Broadcasters.

== History ==
On December 7, 2016, Central Arkansas Radio Group, LLC acquired KYRC from Noalmark Broadcasting Corporation.

On February 24, 2017, KYRC changed their format from mainstream rock to a simulcast of Christian radio-formatted KHCB-FM 105.7 Houston, Texas, as a result of a sale from Central Arkansas Radio Group, LLC to Houston Christian Broadcasters. On March 7, 2017, KYRC changed their call letters to KPWA.
