= US Stations, LLC =

US Stations, LLC is a radio broadcaster in Hot Springs, Arkansas, United States.

== History ==
US Stations, LLC was founded in 2004. US Stations owned KZNG (1340 AM), KLXQ (96.7 FM) & KQUS-FM (97.5 FM) in Hot Springs, & KWXE (104.5 FM) in Pearcy. In 1994, KTDX (101.9 FM) in Mountain Pine, which was owned by US Stations, went on the air. In 1996, KTDX changed their call letters to KZBR. In 2002, KLXQ changed their call letters to KYDL & KZBR changed their call letters to KLXQ. In 2008, KWXE changed their call letters to KLBL. In 2009, KYDL changed their call letters to KHTO. In 2016, US Stations sold KLXQ & KLBL to Central Arkansas Radio Group, LLC and purchased KBHS (1420 AM), K288FP (105.5 FM) & KLAZ (105.9 FM) in Hot Springs & KHRK (101.5 FM) in Malvern from the same company. KHTO changed their call letters to KLXQ & KHRK changed their call letters to KLBL.
