= KDVY =

Repeater for KHCB-FM
- Crockett, Texas; United States
- Broadcast area: Huntsville, Palestine, Centerville, Madisonville and Crockett, Texas
- Frequency: 93.5 MHz
- Branding: KHCB Radio Network

Programming
- Format: Christian Radio

Ownership
- Owner: Houston Christian Broadcasters, Inc.
- Sister stations: KHCH, KHCB-FM, KHCB, KHML

History
- First air date: May 28, 1985 (as KCKR)
- Former call signs: KCKR (1982–1987); KBHT (1987–2013); KBPC (2013–2020)

Technical information
- Licensing authority: FCC
- Facility ID: 3526
- Class: C2
- ERP: 50,000 watts
- HAAT: 146.0 meters (479.0 ft)
- Transmitter coordinates: 31°20′3″N 95°47′13″W
- Translator: (95.9 MHz) K240EO (Lufkin)

Links
- Public license information: Public file; LMS
- Webcast: Listen Live
- Website: www.khcb.org

KDVY (93.5 FM, KHCB Radio Network) is a terrestrial American radio station broadcasting a Christian format. Licensed to Crockett, Texas, United States, the station serves the Piney Woods area of East Texas.

The station is currently owned by Houston Christian Broadcasters, Inc. KDVY's transmit tower is located on Texas State Highway 7, halfway between Centerville and Crockett.

KBPC LLC. filed paperwork with the Federal Communications Commission on October 8, 2019, to donate KBPC to Houston-based Houston Christian Broadcasters for no monetary consideration. The FCC granted the license transfer on January 17, 2020, with the former "Smooth Rock 93.5" branding and format signing off the next day.

The station's call sign was changed from KBPC to KDVY on January 27, 2020. KDVY fully simulcasts the parent station of the KHCB Radio Network, KHCB-FM.

== History ==
The station was founded by Amanda Steed Kelton (ASK Broadcasting.) The first day on air was November 22, 1982.

The station was assigned the call sign KCKR on October 12, 1982. It received a license to cover on May 28, 1985, signing on with a country format, and using the "Kicker" branding. On June 15, 1987, the station changed its call sign to KBHT, to KBPC on February 12, 2013, and finally to KDVY on January 27, 2020.

The station was a country music station for most of its existence. The only exceptions were under the stewardship of Weston Entertainment, who changed then KBHT to classic rock, the previous smooth rock format which replaced "Pine Country", and the current Christian programming from Houston Christian Broadcasters.

Weston Entertainment sold KBHT to KBPC, LLC. (Also owned by Greg Weston) in 2013, after accusations of sexual harassment were levied against Weston and Corporate station management, forcing the facility off of the air. KBPC, LLC. returned KBHT to the air on June 5, 2013. Once operations resumed, KBHT reverted to country music, changed call letters to KBPC, and renamed "Pine Country 93.5". In 2016, the courts found in favor of Carla Leigh & Jimmy Hill in a sexual harassment case and the two former DJs were awarded an undisclosed settlement in the case.

As "Smooth Rock 93.5", the station returned a local rock based format to the Piney Woods area. The format blended current recording artists like Puddle of Mudd with classic rock groups such as Journey, focusing on ballads and adult rock hits.

Previous KBHT classic rock hosts include Jimmy "The Hitman" Hill, Carla Leigh, Big Chuck "The Original Outlaw" Franklin, JR Blue & "Magic" Mike Hubbard, and Jake "The Snake" Auston.
