= KVMZ =

Coordinates: 33°17′59″N 93°14′00″W

Simulcasts KELD-FM, El Dorado, AR
- Waldo, Arkansas; United States
- Broadcast area: Magnolia, Arkansas
- Frequency: 99.1 MHz
- Branding: MAX FM

Programming
- Format: Contemporary hit radio
- Affiliations: Fox News Radio; Compass Media Networks

Ownership
- Owner: Noalmark Broadcasting Corporation
- Sister stations: KAGL, KDMS, KELD, KELD-FM, KIXB, KLBQ, KMLK, KMRX, KVMA

Technical information
- Licensing authority: FCC
- Facility ID: 86171
- Class: A
- ERP: 4,100 watts
- HAAT: 122 meters (400 ft)
- Transmitter coordinates: a

Links
- Public license information: Public file; LMS
- Webcast: Listen live
- Website: magnoliaradio.com

KVMZ (99.1 FM) is a radio station licensed to Waldo, Arkansas. The station broadcasts a contemporary hit radio format and is owned by Noalmark Broadcasting Corporation.

Previous logo

On April 3, 2023, the station became a simulcast of KELD-FM.
