= KYXK =

- Gurdon, Arkansas; United States
- Broadcast area: Arkadelphia, Arkansas
- Frequency: 106.9 MHz
- Branding: Z Rocks

Programming
- Format: Classic rock

Ownership
- Owner: Broadcast Industry Group, LLC
- Sister stations: KAFN, KASZ, KCAT, KCMC-FM, KDEL-FM, KLRG, KVRC, KWPS-FM, KZYP

History
- First air date: November 28, 1984 (as KGAP)
- Former call signs: KGAP (1984–1993)
- Call sign meaning: "Kicks"

Technical information
- Licensing authority: FCC
- Facility ID: 52416
- Class: C3
- ERP: 17,500 watts
- HAAT: 92 meters (302 feet)
- Transmitter coordinates: 33°56′42″N 93°10′43″W

Links
- Public license information: Public file; LMS

KYXK (106.9 FM) is a radio station licensed to serve Gurdon, Arkansas, United States. The station is owned and operated by Broadcast Industry Group, LLC. It airs a classic rock music format known as "Z-Rocks".

The station was assigned the KYXK call letters by the Federal Communications Commission on February 8, 1993.

In February 2025, E Radio Network filed a $1 million deal to buy KYXK, which then flipped to "Hot Country 106.9". Then once again in early 2025, the sale failed to close. Since E Radio Network couldn't finalize the transaction, KYXK went silent and kicked the bucket in December 2025. Early November 2026, KYXK and its other sister stations came back with a classic rock format. As of now, it is still owned and operated by
