= KBHS (disambiguation) =

KBHS may refer to:

- KBHS, a radio station (1420 AM) licensed to serve Hot Springs, Arkansas, United States
- KLXQ, a radio station (96.7 FM) licensed to serve Hot Springs, Arkansas, United States, which held the call sign from 1988 to 1991

== Schools ==
- Keira High School, Wollongong, New South Wales, Australia
- Kelston Boys' High School, Auckland, New Zealand
- Kimberley Boys' High School, Kimberley, North Cape, South Africa
- Kubasaki High School, a United States Department of Defense Dependents School located on Okinawa, Japan
