= KHCB =

KHCB may refer to:

- KHCB (AM), a radio station (1400 AM) licensed to serve League City, Texas, United States
- KHCB-FM, a radio station (105.7 FM) licensed to serve Houston, Texas
