= KXQK =

KXQK may refer to:

- KDER, a radio station (99.3 FM) licensed to serve Comstock, Texas, United States, which held the call sign KXQK from 2015 to 2017
- KHCU (FM), a radio station (93.1 FM) licensed to serve Leakey, Texas, which held the call sign KXQK from 2013 to 2014
