= KHTO =

KHTO may refer to:

== Radio stations ==
- KHHS, a radio station (104.5 FM) licensed to serve Pearcy, Arkansas, United States, which held the call sign KHTO-FM from 2016 to 2017
- KLXQ, a radio station (96.7 FM) licensed to serve Hot Springs, Arkansas, which held the call sign KHTO from 2009 to 2016
- KZTB, a radio station (97.9 FM) licensed to serve Milton-Freewater, Oregon, United States, which held the call sign KHTO from 2004 to 2006
- KOLW, a radio station (97.5 FM) licensed to serve Basin City, Washington, United States, which held the call sign KHTO in 2004
- KRVI, a radio station (106.7 FM) licensed to serve Mount Vernon, Missouri, United States, which held the call sign KHTO from 1994 to 2003

== Airports ==
- East Hampton Airport, in Wainscott, New York, which formerly held the ICAO callsign KHTO
