= KLEZ =

Klez is a computer worm that propagates via e-mail, first appeared in October 2001.

KLEZ or Klez may also refer to:

- KLBL, a radio station (101.5 FM) in Malvern, Arkansas, United States, assigned call sign KLEZ 2003–2009
- KPWA, a radio station (93.5 FM) in Bismarck, Arkansas, United States, assigned call sign KLEZ 2009–2011

== See also ==
- KlezKamp, a yearly Klezmer music and Yiddish culture festival, New York State, 1984–2014
