= KVRC =

Radio station in Arkadelphia, Arkansas

Coordinates: 34°06′39″N 93°03′01″W

- Arkadelphia, Arkansas; United States
- Broadcast area: Arkadelphia, Arkansas
- Frequency: 1240 kHz
- Branding: EZ Rock

Programming
- Format: Classic hits

Ownership
- Owner: High Plains Radio Network, LLC
- Operator: E Radio Network, LLC
- Sister stations: KAFN, KASZ, KCAT, KCMC-FM, KDEL-FM, KLRG, KWPS-FM, KYXK, KZYP

History
- First air date: 1947

Technical information
- Licensing authority: FCC
- Facility ID: 24734
- Class: C
- Power: 1,000 watts unlimited

Links
- Public license information: Public file; LMS

KVRC (1240 AM) is a radio station licensed to Arkadelphia, Arkansas. The station is owned by High Plains Radio Network, LLC and operated by E Radio Network, LLC.
