= KLBQ =

KLBQ may refer to:

- KLBQ (FM), a radio station (101.5 FM) licensed to Junction City, Arkansas, United States
- KMLK, a radio station (98.7 FM) licensed to El Dorado, Arkansas, United States, which held the call sign KLBQ from 1979 to 2017
