= KHCU (FM) =

KHCB radio station in Concan, Texas, United States

- Concan, Texas; United States
- Broadcast area: Uvalde, Texas
- Frequency: 93.1 MHz
- Branding: Radio Amistad

Programming
- Format: Spanish Christian

Ownership
- Owner: Houston Christian Broadcasters, Inc.
- Sister stations: KHCB (AM), KHCH, KTKC (AM), KHKV, KCCE (AM), KMAT, KJDS

History
- First air date: 1997
- Former call signs: KBLT (1997–2013); KXQK (2013–2014); KHJQ (2014–2017)
- Former frequencies: 104.3 MHz (1997–2014)

Technical information
- Licensing authority: FCC
- Facility ID: 82894
- Class: C3
- ERP: 25,000 watts
- HAAT: 100 meters (330 ft)
- Transmitter coordinates: 29°31′55.33″N 99°44′40.1″W

Links
- Public license information: Public file; LMS
- Website: www.radioamistad.net/web/

KHCU (93.1 FM) is a radio station licensed to Concan, Texas, United States. The station is currently owned by Houston Christian Broadcasters, Inc. and forms part of the Spanish-language KHCB "Radio Amistad" network, originating at KHCB AM in Houston.

== History ==
The Federal Communications Commission issued a construction permit for the station to Horizon Broadcasting, Inc. on March 28, 1997. The station was assigned the KBLT call sign on May 12, 1997, and received its license to cover on September 10, 1997. On October 23, 2000, Horizon assigned the station's license to Radio Cactus, Ltd., along with that of then-sister station KBNU.

Radio Cactus, Ltd. sold the station to George Chambers' Radio Dalhart, Inc. The purchase was consummated on March 18, 2013. On May 3, 2013, the station changed its call sign to KXQK, and again on February 20, 2014 to KHJQ.

On April 16, 2014, the station was issued a license to move from its original 104.3 MHz frequency to 93.1 MHz. On December 11, 2015, KHJQ was issued a license to move its community of license from Leakey, Texas to Concan.

Effective June 14, 2017, Radio Dalhart donated KHCU's license to Houston Christian Broadcasters, Inc. The station changed its call sign to the current KHCU on June 29, 2017.
