= KTKC =

KTKC may refer to:

- KTKC (AM), a radio station (1460 AM) licensed to Springhill, Louisiana, United States
- KSPH, a radio station (92.9 FM) licensed to Springhill, Louisiana, which held the call sign KTKC-FM until 2018
