= KPZA =

KPZA may refer to:

- KPZA-FM, a radio station (103.7 FM) licensed to Jal, New Mexico, United States
- KZHS, a radio station (590 AM) licensed to Hot Springs, Arkansas, United States, which held the call sign KPZA from January 2005 to November 2008
