= KVMA =

KVMA may refer to:

- KVMA (AM), a radio station (630 AM) licensed to Magnolia, Arkansas, United States
- KVMA-FM, a radio station (102.9 FM) licensed to Shreveport, Louisiana, United States
