= KDEL-FM =

- Arkadelphia, Arkansas; United States
- Broadcast area: Arkadelphia, Arkansas
- Frequency: 100.9 MHz
- Branding: Hot Country

Programming
- Format: Country

Ownership
- Owner: High Plains Radio Network, LLC
- Operator: E Radio Network, LLC
- Sister stations: KAFN, KASZ, KCAT, KCMC-FM, KLRG, KVRC, KWPS-FM, KYXK, KZYP

History
- First air date: January 31, 1979
- Call sign meaning: ArKaDELphia

Technical information
- Licensing authority: FCC
- Facility ID: 24733
- Class: A
- ERP: 3,000 watts
- HAAT: 29 meters (95 ft)
- Transmitter coordinates: 34°06′39″N 93°03′01″W

Links
- Public license information: Public file; LMS

KDEL-FM (100.9 MHz) is a radio station licensed to serve Arkadelphia, Arkansas, United States. The station is owned by High Plains Radio Network, LLC and operated by E Radio Network, LLC.

The station was assigned the KDEL-FM call sign by the Federal Communications Commission on January 31, 1979.
