= KIXV =

KIXV may refer to:

- KIXV (FM), a radio station (91.5 FM) licensed to serve Muleshoe, Texas, United States; see List of radio stations in Texas
- KPWA, a radio station (93.5 FM) licensed to serve Bismarck, Arkansas, United States, which held the call sign KIXV from 2013 to 2014
