= KDMS =

- El Dorado, Arkansas; United States
- Broadcast area: El Dorado
- Frequency: 1290 kHz
- Branding: 1290 KDMS-AM

Programming
- Format: Gospel

Ownership
- Owner: Noalmark Broadcasting Corporation
- Sister stations: KAGL, KELD, KELD-FM, KIXB, KLBQ, KMLK, KMRX, KVMA, KVMZ

History
- First air date: October 3, 1950; 75 years ago (first license granted)

Technical information
- Licensing authority: FCC
- Facility ID: 19089
- Class: D
- Power: 2,500 watts day; 106 watts night
- Transmitter coordinates: 33°14′14″N 92°39′54″W

Links
- Public license information: Public file; LMS

KDMS (1290 AM) is a radio station licensed to El Dorado, Arkansas, United States, and serving the El Dorado area. The station is currently owned by Noalmark Broadcasting Corporation. Now sharing the site where KELD 1400kHz has its tower. Studios remain at West Hillsboro Street.
