= KBSF =

KBSF may refer to:

- KBSF-LP, a low-power radio station (100.7 FM) licensed to serve Portland, Oregon, United States
- KBSF-TV, a fictitious San Francisco station with a fake news website created as part of Russian interference in the 2024 United States elections
- KTKC (AM), a radio station (1460 AM) licensed to Springhill, Louisiana, United States, which held the call sign KBSF until 2010
