= KHCU =

KHCU may refer to:

- KHCU (FM), a radio station (93.1 FM) licensed to serve Concan, Texas, United States
- Kyung Hee Cyber University
