= KHHS (FM) =

Radio station in Pearcy, Arkansas

Simulcasting KHCB-FM, Houston, TX
- Pearcy, Arkansas; United States
- Broadcast area: Hot Springs, Arkansas
- Frequency: 104.5 MHz

Programming
- Format: Christian radio

Ownership
- Owner: Houston Christian Broadcasters
- Sister stations: KJDS; KLXQ; KPWA; KQUS-FM; KZNG

History
- First air date: September 20, 1989
- Former call signs: KWXE (1989–2008); KLBL (2008–2016); KHTO (2016–2017)

Technical information
- Licensing authority: FCC
- Facility ID: 8149
- Class: A
- ERP: 3,000 watts
- HAAT: 124 meters (407 ft)
- Transmitter coordinates: 34°26′56″N 93°15′59″W

Links
- Public license information: Public file; LMS
- Webcast: Listen live
- Website: khcb.org

KHHS (104.5 FM) is a radio station licensed to Pearcy, Arkansas. The station broadcasts a Christian radio format and is owned by Houston Christian Broadcasters.

== History ==
On December 7, 2016, KLBL was sold from US Stations, LLC to Central Arkansas Radio Group, LLC and changed their format from classic country branded as "104.5 The Bull" to classic hits. "The Bull" branding was moved to 101.5 Malvern and became known as "101.5 The Bull".

On December 14, 2016, KLBL changed their call letters to KHTO.

On February 24, 2017, KHTO changed their format from classic hits to a simulcast of KHCB-FM in Houston, Texas, as a result of a sale from Central Arkansas Radio Group, LLC to Houston Christian Broadcasters.

On March 7, 2017, KHTO changed their call letters to KHHS.
