= F43 =

F43 may refer to:

== Ships ==
- Brazilian frigate Liberal (F-43), a Niterói-class frigate of the Brazilian Navy
- HMS Tartar (F43), a Tribal-class destroyer of the Royal Navy
- HMS Torquay (F43), a Whitby-class frigate of the Royal Navy
- INS Trishul (F43), a Talwar-class frigate of the Indian Navy

== Other uses ==
- Downtown Airport (Arkansas), in El Dorado, Arkansas
