= KDEL =

KDEL could refer to:

- KDEL-FM, a radio station (100.9 FM) licensed to Arkadelphia, Arkansas, United States
- KDEL (amino acid sequence), a sequence in the amino acid structure of a protein which keeps it from secreting from the ER
