= KSPH =

Radio station in Springhill, Louisiana

- Springhill, Louisiana; United States
- Broadcast area: Texarkana
- Frequency: 92.9 MHz
- Branding: KHCB Radio Network

Programming
- Language: English
- Format: Christian radio

Ownership
- Owner: Houston Christian Broadcasters, Inc.
- Sister stations: KTKC, KHCB-FM, KHCB, KHCH

History
- First air date: June 2, 1976
- Former call signs: KTKC (1976–2010); KTKC-FM (2010–2018)
- Call sign meaning: Springhill

Technical information
- Licensing authority: FCC
- Facility ID: 62034
- Class: C2
- ERP: 40,000 watts
- HAAT: 167.0 meters (547.9 ft)
- Transmitter coordinates: 33°0′30.00″N 93°28′38.00″W
- Translator: 96.9 K245BA (Shreveport)

Links
- Public license information: Public file; LMS
- Webcast: Listen live
- Website: www.khcb.org

KSPH (92.9 FM, "KHCB Radio Network") is an American radio station broadcasting a Christian Radio format. Licensed to Springhill, Louisiana, United States, it serves areas such as Texarkana, Magnolia, Haynesville, Cotton Valley, and Plain Dealing.

Originally KTKC, the station was owned by Metropolitan Radio Group from May 1997 until December 2008. Gary Acker, the owner of Metropolitan Radio Group died in August 2000,, and Mark Acker has been selling off the radio stations, acting as personal representative for the estate.

The station was bought in December 2008 by Leon Hunt (owner of KJVC in Mansfield, Louisiana) and continued to broadcast country music. He acquired the station along with KBSF for a reported $175,000

In 2010, KTKC began simulcasting the AM sister station that was programmed with adult standards, so people in Springhill, Louisiana and the surrounding areas could choose to hear artists like Frank Sinatra and Michael Bublé on either AM or FM. 1460 was the granted the KTKC calls, dropping the long held KBSF, requiring this facility to add the -FM suffix.

Houston Christian Broadcasters acquired KTKC-FM and sister station KTKC from Leon Hunt effective May 31, 2018, at a purchase price of $200,000. The new owners changed the station's call sign to KSPH that same day, and began simulcasting programming from the primary KHCB-FM in the Houston, Texas area as a part of the KHCB Radio Network.
