= KELD (AM) =

- El Dorado, Arkansas; United States
- Broadcast area: El Dorado, Arkansas
- Frequency: 1400 kHz
- Branding: News Radio

Programming
- Format: Talk radio
- Affiliations: Fox Sports Radio

Ownership
- Owner: Noalmark Broadcasting Corporation
- Sister stations: KAGL, KDMS KELD-FM, KIXB, KLBQ, KMLK, KMRX, KVMA, KVMZ

History
- First air date: 1935; 91 years ago

Technical information
- Licensing authority: FCC
- Facility ID: 48945
- Class: C
- Power: 1,000 watts unlimited
- Transmitter coordinates: 33°14′14″N 92°39′54″W
- Translator: 94.3 K232FT (El Dorado)

Links
- Public license information: Public file; LMS

KELD (1400 kHz, is an AM radio station broadcasting a News–Talk format. Licensed to El Dorado, Arkansas, United States, the station serves the El Dorado area. The station is currently owned by Noalmark Broadcasting Corporation.
