= KELD-FM =

- Hampton, Arkansas; United States
- Broadcast area: El Dorado, Arkansas
- Frequency: 106.5 MHz
- Branding: MAX FM

Programming
- Format: Top 40 (CHR)
- Affiliations: Fox News Radio; Compass Media Networks

Ownership
- Owner: Noalmark Broadcasting Corporation
- Sister stations: KAGL, KDMS, KELD, KIXB, KLBQ, KMLK, KMRX, KVMA, KVMZ

History
- First air date: November 26, 1984
- Former call signs: KKOL (1984–1997); KKOL-FM (1997–2003)
- Former frequencies: 107.1 MHz (1984–1999)
- Call sign meaning: El Dorado (area served)

Technical information
- Licensing authority: FCC
- Facility ID: 61239
- Class: C3
- ERP: 17,500 watts
- HAAT: 92 meters (302 ft)
- Transmitter coordinates: 33°32′23.6″N 92°34′59.3″W
- Repeater: 99.1 KVMZ (Magnolia)

Links
- Public license information: Public file; LMS
- Webcast: Listen live
- Website: www.magnoliaradio.com

KELD-FM (106.5 MHz) is an American radio station licensed to Hampton, Arkansas, United States, the station serves the El Dorado area. The station is currently owned by Noalmark Broadcasting Corporation.

== History ==
On March 1, 2017 KELD-FM changed the format from talk to adult hits, branded as "106.5 The Planet". (into taken from stationintel.com) On March 5, 2019 KELD rebranded as "Max 106.5" and the format changed to Top 40 (CHR). In April 2023 KVMZ began simulcasting KELD.
