= KMRX =

- El Dorado, Arkansas; United States
- Broadcast area: North Louisiana; South Arkansas
- Frequency: 96.1 MHz
- Branding: Big 96.1 FM

Programming
- Language: English
- Format: Classic hits

Ownership
- Owner: Noalmark Broadcasting Corporation
- Sister stations: KAGL, KDMS, KELD, KELD-FM, KIXB, KLBQ, KMLK, KVMA, KVMZ

History
- First air date: May 12, 1984; 41 years ago
- Former call signs: KIXK (1986–1991); KBLT (1991–1993); KBYB (1993–2001); KXZX (2000–2004)

Technical information
- Licensing authority: FCC
- Facility ID: 35010
- Class: C1
- ERP: 100,000 watts
- HAAT: 136 meters (446 feet)
- Transmitter coordinates: 33°16′16″N 92°39′17″W

Links
- Public license information: Public file; LMS
- Webcast: Listen Live
- Website: www.accessarkla.com

KMRX (96.1 FM, "Big 96.1") is a classic hits music formatted radio station located and licensed in El Dorado, Arkansas, and serves North Louisiana and South Arkansas. The station is owned and operated by Noalmark Broadcasting Corporation.

The station was assigned the KMRX call letters by the Federal Communications Commission on July 5, 2004.

When its call letters were KXZX, the station originally had a HAC format and was branded as "96X". When the call letters changed to KMRX, the station was rebranded as "Mix 96.1" and then "Power 96.1". The station aired The Kidd Kraddick Morning Show during this time. In 2017 when the station switched its format to classic hits and became "Big 96.1", the HAC format moved to KELD-FM which rebranded as "106.5 the Planet".

KMRX is managed by J.J. Cook. Operations Manager is J. Randal Harvey.
