= KAGL =

- El Dorado, Arkansas; United States
- Broadcast area: El Dorado, Arkansas
- Frequency: 93.3 MHz
- Branding: The Eagle 93

Programming
- Format: Classic rock

Ownership
- Owner: Noalmark Broadcasting Corporation
- Sister stations: KDMS, KELD, KELD-FM, KIXB, KMLK, KMRX, KLBQ, KVMA, KVMZ

History
- First air date: 1989; 37 years ago
- Former call signs: KLTW (1989–1993); KISQ (1993–1997)
- Call sign meaning: Eagle

Technical information
- Licensing authority: FCC
- Facility ID: 48949
- Class: C3
- ERP: 18,000 watts
- HAAT: 108 meters (354 ft)
- Transmitter coordinates: 33°16′16″N 92°39′17″W

Links
- Public license information: Public file; LMS
- Website: www.accessarkla.com/entertainment/local-radio

KAGL (93.3 FM, "The Eagle") is a radio station broadcasting a classic rock format. Licensed to El Dorado, Arkansas, United States, the station serves the El Dorado area. The station is currently owned by Noalmark Broadcasting Corporation and features local programming.

== History ==
The station was assigned call sign KLTW on April 13, 1989. On April 26, 1993, the station changed its call sign to KISQ, and on April 17, 1997 to the current KAGL.
