= KANJ (FM) =

Simulcast of KHCB-FM, Houston
- Giddings, Texas; United States
- Frequency: 91.1 MHz

Programming
- Format: Christian

Ownership
- Owner: Houston Christian Broadcasters, Inc.

History
- First air date: 1998
- Call sign meaning: "Keeping Always Near Jesus"

Technical information
- Licensing authority: FCC
- Facility ID: 72440
- Class: A
- ERP: 450 watts
- HAAT: 102 meters (335 ft)
- Transmitter coordinates: 30°09′56″N 96°52′15″W

Links
- Public license information: Public file; LMS
- Webcast: Listen Live
- Website: khcb.org

KANJ (91.1 FM) is a non-commercial educational radio station licensed to serve Giddings, Texas, United States. The station, established in 1998, is owned by Houston Christian Broadcasters, Inc.

KANJ broadcasts a Christian radio format. The station's programming is a simulcast of KHCB-FM in Houston, Texas, as part of the KHCB Radio Network.

== History ==
This station received its original construction permit from the Federal Communications Commission on July 17, 1995. The new station was assigned the KANJ call sign by the FCC on September 8, 1995. KANJ received its license to cover from the FCC on April 8, 1999.

In July 1999, license holder Wilderness Educational Corporation reached an agreement to sell this station to Houston Christian Broadcasters, Inc. The deal was approved by the FCC on September 10, 1999, and the transaction was consummated on November 4, 1999.
