= KMLK =

- El Dorado, Arkansas; United States
- Broadcast area: El Dorado, Arkansas
- Frequency: 98.7 MHz
- Branding: 98.7 KMLK

Programming
- Format: Urban contemporary
- Affiliations: Premiere Networks

Ownership
- Owner: Noalmark Broadcasting Corporation
- Sister stations: KAGL, KDMS, KELD, KELD-FM, KIXB, KLBQ, KMRX, KVMA, KVMZ

History
- First air date: December 23, 1963
- Former call signs: KRIL (1963–1979); KLBQ (1979–2017)

Technical information
- Licensing authority: FCC
- Facility ID: 84090
- Class: C3
- ERP: 14,000 watts
- HAAT: 91 meters (299 ft)
- Transmitter coordinates: 33°12′30″N 92°41′16″W

Links
- Public license information: Public file; LMS
- Webcast: Listen live
- Website: mykmlk.com

KMLK (98.7 FM, "98.7 KMLK") is an American radio station airing an urban contemporary format licensed to El Dorado, Arkansas. The station is owned by Noalmark Broadcasting Corporation.

== History ==
The station started life as KRIL, and aired a country format in the mid-1970s. When KRIL changed its call sign to KLBQ in 1979, the station dropped the format and flipped to a Top 40 music format under the branding "Q99". Due to major Top 40 competition in the market, the station evolved into a Hot AC format in the 1980s. In the 2010s, the station flipped back to country. On July 13, 2017, both KMLK and KLBQ swapped call signs and frequencies.
