= KIXB =

- El Dorado, Arkansas; United States
- Frequency: 103.3 MHz
- Branding: KIX 103

Programming
- Format: Country

Ownership
- Owner: Noalmark Broadcasting Corporation
- Sister stations: KAGL, KDMS, KELD, KELD-FM, KLBQ, KMLK, KMRX, KVMA, KVMZ

History
- First air date: May 11, 1993
- Former call signs: KEZU (?-1979); KAYZ (1979–1993)
- Call sign meaning: KIX Brooks

Technical information
- Licensing authority: FCC
- Facility ID: 48946
- Class: C1
- ERP: 100,000 watts
- HAAT: 174 meters (571 feet)
- Transmitter coordinates: 33°13′20″N 92°55′28″W

Links
- Public license information: Public file; LMS
- Webcast: Listen Live

KIXB (103.3 FM, "KIX 103") is a radio station licensed to El Dorado, Arkansas, United States. The station broadcasting a country music format.. The station is serving in the South Arkansas region. The station is owned by Noalmark Broadcasting Corporation.

The station was assigned the KIXB call sign by the Federal Communications Commission on May 11, 1993.
