= KVMA (AM) =

- Magnolia, Arkansas; United States
- Frequency: 630 kHz
- Branding: Fox Sports 107.1 FM & 630 AM

Programming
- Format: Sports radio
- Affiliations: Fox Sports Radio

Ownership
- Owner: Noalmark Broadcasting Corporation
- Sister stations: KAGL; KDMS; KELD; KELD-FM; KIXB; KLBQ; KMLK; KMRX; KVMZ

History
- Call sign meaning: Magnolia

Technical information
- Licensing authority: FCC
- Facility ID: 39618
- Class: D
- Power: 1,000 watts day; 30 watts night
- Transmitter coordinates: 33°17′59.5″N 93°13′57.6″W
- Translator: 107.1 K296FC (Magnolia)

Links
- Public license information: Public file; LMS
- Website: www.magnoliaradio.com

KVMA (630 kHz) is an AM radio station licensed to Magnolia, Arkansas. The station broadcasts a sports radio format and is owned by Noalmark Broadcasting Corporation.

On April 3, 2023, the station switched to sports with programming from Fox Sports Radio.
