= Downtown Airport (Arkansas) =

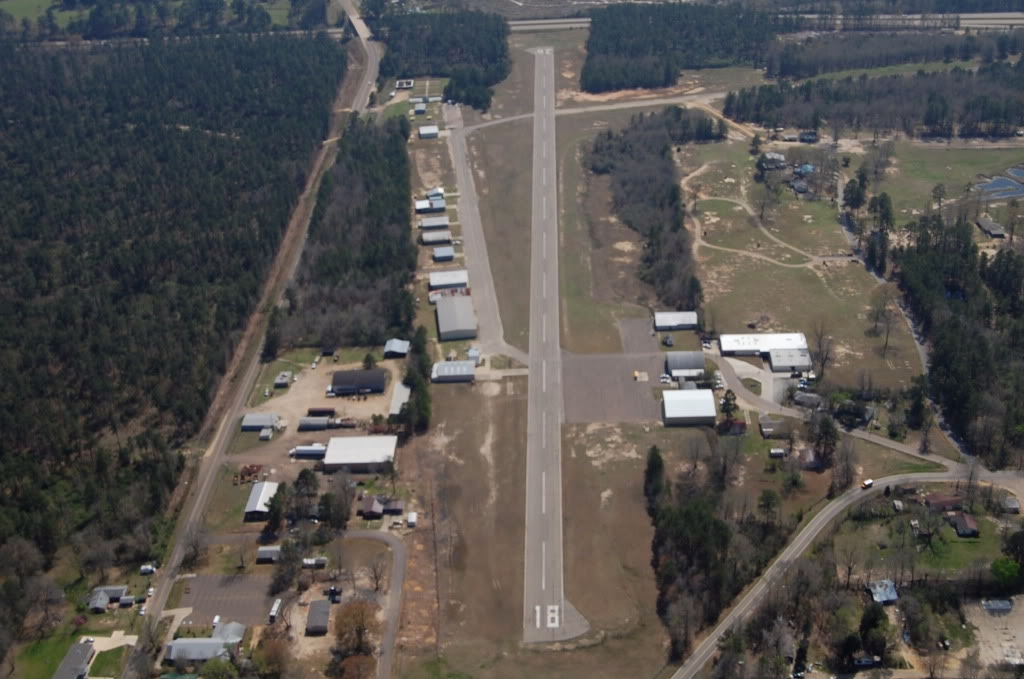
- IATA: none; ICAO: none; FAA LID: F43

Summary
- Airport type: Public
- Owner: City of El Dorado
- Serves: El Dorado, Arkansas
- Elevation AMSL: 256 ft (78 m)
- Coordinates: 33°11′28″N 092°39′48″W

Map
- Location of airport in Arkansas

Runways
Direction	Length		Surface
Direction	ft	m	Surface
18/36	3,000	914	Asphalt

Statistics (2007)
- Aircraft operations: 29,000
- Based aircraft: 35
- Source: Federal Aviation Administration

Downtown Airport (FAA LID: F43) is a city-owned, public-use airport located in El Dorado, a city in Union County, Arkansas, United States.

== Facilities and aircraft ==
Downtown Airport covers an area of 88 acres (36 ha) at an elevation of 256 feet (78 m) above mean sea level. It has one runway designated 18/36 with an asphalt surface measuring 3,000 by 60 feet (914 x 18 m).

For the 12-month period ending June 30, 2007, the airport had 29,000 aircraft operations, an average of 79 per day: 97% general aviation and 3% air taxi. At that time there were 35 aircraft based at this airport: 80% single-engine, 6% multi-engine, and 14% ultralight.
