= KAFN =

- Benton, Arkansas; United States
- Broadcast area: Saline County, Arkansas
- Frequency: 690 kHz
- Branding: EZ Rock

Programming
- Format: Classic hits

Ownership
- Owner: Monte Spearman and Gentry Todd Spearman; (High Plains Radio Network, LLC)
- Operator: E Radio Network, LLC
- Sister stations: KDEL-FM, KVRC, KWPS-FM, KYXK, KZYP

History
- First air date: June 26, 1953
- Former call signs: KBBA (1953-1992); KEWI (1992–2015)

Technical information
- Licensing authority: FCC
- Facility ID: 4839
- Class: D
- Power: 250 watts day 73 watts night
- Transmitter coordinates: 34°31′57.00″N 92°34′16.00″W
- Translator: 99.3 K257GP (Benton)

Links
- Public license information: Public file; LMS

KAFN (690 AM) is a radio station broadcasting a classic hits format. Licensed to Benton, Arkansas, the station mainly programs local content for Saline County, along with the southern portion of the Little Rock metropolitan area.

Currently owned by Monte Spearman and Gentry Todd Spearman, through licensee High Plains Radio Network, LLC and operated by E Radio Network, LLC, the station currently broadcasts a classic hits format. The station also carries network play-by-play for the Dallas Cowboys, St. Louis Cardinals, and Arkansas Razorbacks football, basketball and baseball, and local play-by-play for Benton High School.

== History ==
The radio station was put on the air on June 26, 1953, and was known as KBBA until 1992. During this time, it broadcast a mostly country/western format with local news, weather, and sports. It was the only radio station in Benton until 1966, when competing radio station KGKO signed on the air at 850 kHz.

The station was owned by the Winston Riddle family of Benton for a number of years before being sold in the early 1990s. The station's call letters were changed to KEWI by new owner Bernie Bottenberg. After falling on hard times, the station was sold to a partnership consisting of longtime Arkansas television broadcaster Jim Landers, and his nephews Steve and Lance Landers who were prominent local car dealers. Jim Landers would later purchase full ownership stock in the station.

In the 1990s and 2000s, the station enjoyed a number of formats, including classic country and, later on, adult standards. It has been known for its tradition of broadcasting local sports, most notably Benton High School football, basketball, and baseball.

In fall 2011, the station was sold to an ownership group headed by broadcaster Grant Merrill. The station switched to a news, talk, and sports format and developed an online newspaper known as Saline 24/7. The station serves as a home base for the syndicated "Sports Night" program broadcast across the Arkansas Radio Network. The show is owned and hosted by Merrill and longtime print journalist Andy Hodges.

The station applied for an FM translator (K277BT), which signed on the air in the fall of 2013 at 103.3 FM. The translator moved to 93.7 FM in Benton, Arkansas on February 29, 2016, as K229CX, and again to 99.3 as K257GP on November 26, 2018.

On February 7, 2014, KEWI went silent and then returned to the air on June 20, 2014 with a sports format with programming from ESPN Radio. The call sign was changed to the current KAFN on August 1, 2015.

Effective October 6, 2017, Saline River Media sold KAFN to High Plains Radio Network, LLC for $50,000.

KAFN currently broadcasts a classic rock format.

On May 19, 2024, HPRN took 9 of its stations (including KAFN) dark due to their transmitter lease dispute with a tower company, preparing to filed for Chapter 11 bankruptcy

In March 2025, E Radio Network, LLC begun operating KAFN and returned it to the air with a classic hits format under the branding "EZ Rock".
