= KQUS-FM =

Coordinates: 34.404°N 93.121°W

- Hot Springs, Arkansas; United States
- Broadcast area: Hot Springs, Arkansas
- Frequency: 97.5 MHz
- Branding: US97

Programming
- Format: Mainstream Country

Ownership
- Owner: US Stations, LLC
- Sister stations: KZNG, KLXQ, KLBL, KLAZ

History
- First air date: February 7, 1969
- Former call signs: KWBO (1982–1986)
- Call sign meaning: K Q US 97

Technical information
- Licensing authority: FCC
- Facility ID: 16572
- Class: C1
- ERP: 100,000 watts
- HAAT: 264 meters

Links
- Public license information: Public file; LMS
- Webcast: Listen Live
- Website: myhotsprings.com

KQUS-FM (97.5 FM), known as "US97", is a Mainstream Country formatted radio station located in Hot Springs, Arkansas. It broadcasts with an ERP of 100,000 Watts from its broadcast tower on Mount Riante, south of Hot Springs in Garland County, Arkansas, where it shares tower space with sister station KLXQ.

KQUS is owned and operated by US Stations, LLC, a local company that also owns KZNG, KLXQ and KLAZ in Hot Springs, Arkansas and KLBL in Malvern, Arkansas.

With a 13.0 share (12+), US97 was ranked #1 of 21 in Arbitron Ratings Data for Spring of '11.

Notable weekday on-air programming includes mornings with the "US97 Wake-Up Crew" with Vicki Parker & Jarrett Jackson, mid-days with Craig Dale and afternoons with Pat O'Briant.

== Studio location ==
The US Stations broadcast studio is in the former KVTH-TV Channel 26 building near the Hot Springs Mall. The previous US97 studio was in the upstairs part of the television studio, but has since moved to a new addition built in late 2006.

KQUS shares a building with sister stations KZNG, KLXQ, KLBL and KLAZ.
