= KJDS =

KHCB Christian radio station in Mountain Pine, Arkansas

Coordinates: 34.449°N 93.267°W

- Mountain Pine, Arkansas; United States
- Broadcast area: Hot Springs, Arkansas
- Frequency: 101.9 MHz

Programming
- Format: Spanish Religious

Ownership
- Owner: Houston Christian Broadcasters, Inc.
- Sister stations: KZNG (1994–2016), KLXQ (1994–2016), KQUS (1994–2016)

History
- First air date: June 17, 1994 (as KTDX)
- Former call signs: KTDX (1994–1996); KZBR (1996–2002); KLXQ (2002–2016); KHRK (2016–2017)

Technical information
- Licensing authority: FCC
- Facility ID: 40223
- Class: A
- ERP: 3,100 watts
- HAAT: 124 meters

Links
- Public license information: Public file; LMS
- Website: https://www.radioamistad.net/web/

KJDS (101.9 FM) is a Spanish Religious station in Hot Springs, Arkansas. It broadcasts with an ERP of 3.1 kW (3,100 watts) from its broadcast tower on Pearcy Road, southwest of Hot Springs in Garland County, Arkansas.

Prior to being sold to KHCB, the station was owned and operated by US Stations, LLC, a local company that also owns KZNG, KBHS, KLXQ, KQUS and KLAZ in Hot Springs and KLBL in Malvern.

== History ==
On December 7, 2016, KLXQ was sold from US Stations, LLC to Central Arkansas Radio Group, LLC and changed their format from classic rock branded as "101.9 The Rocket" to classic hits. "The Rocket" branding was moved to 96.7 Hot Springs and became known as "96.7 The Rocket".

On December 14, 2016, KLXQ changed their call letters to KHRK.

On February 24, 2017, KHRK changed their format from classic hits to a simulcast of KHCB 105.7 Houston, Texas, as a result of a sale from Central Arkansas Radio Group, LLC to Houston Christian Broadcasters, Inc.

On March 7, 2017, KHRK changed their call letters to KHHS.

== Studio location ==
The US Stations broadcast studio is in the former KVTH-TV Channel 26 building near the Hot Springs Mall. The previous KLXQ studio was in the upstairs part of the television studio, but has since moved to a new addition built in late 2006.

The former KHRK-FM previously shared a building with sister stations KQUS, KLXQ, and KZNG.
