= El Dorado, Arkansas =

- City
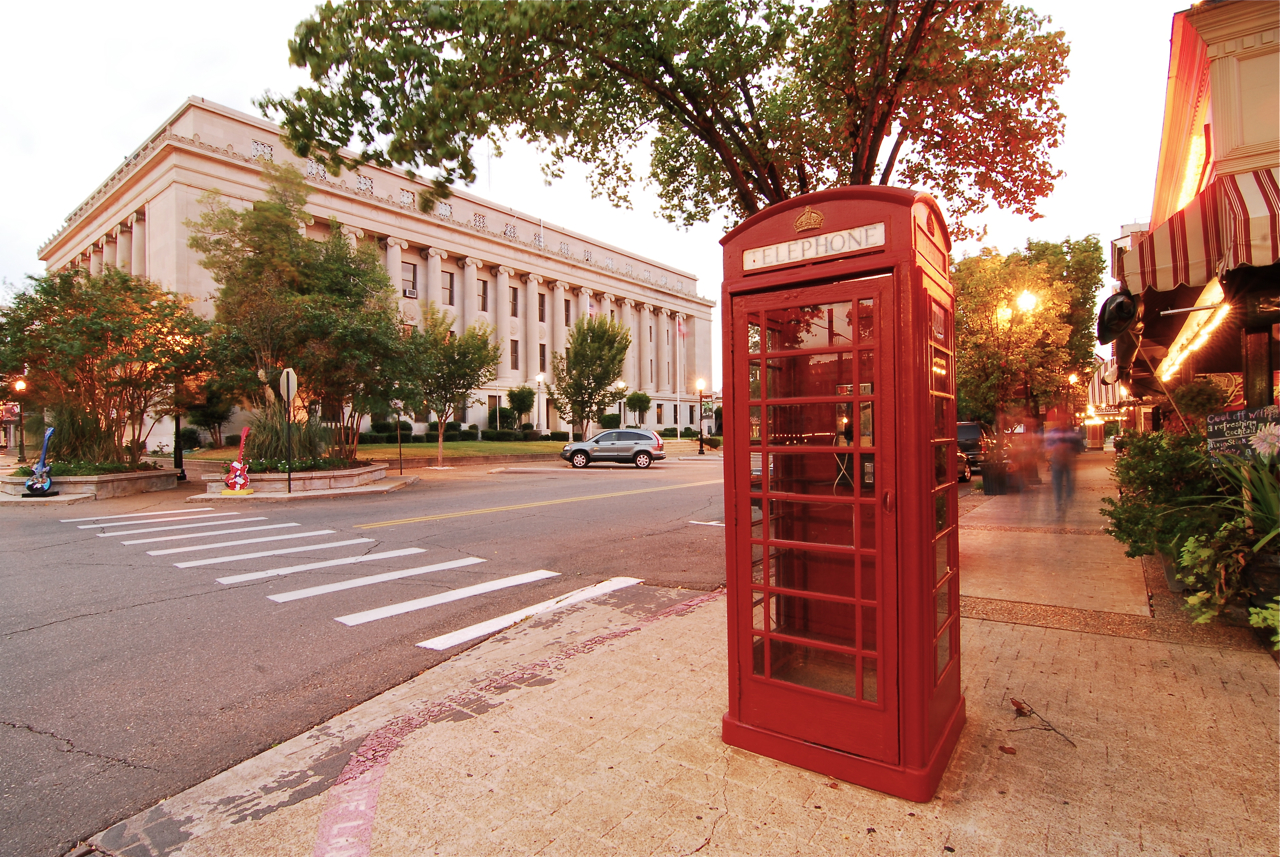
- Jefferson Street in downtown El Dorado's Union Square District

- Location of El Dorado in Union County, Arkansas

- Location within Arkansas Location within the United States Location within North America Location within America
- Coordinates: 33°14′10″N 92°38′30″W
- Country: United States
- State: Arkansas
- County: Union
- Founded: 1843 (183 years ago)
- Established: May 5, 1870 (156 years ago)

Government
  - Type: Mayor–council
  - Body: El Dorado City Council
  - Mayor: Paul Choate

Area
  - City: 16.21 sq mi (41.98 km^{2})
  - Land: 16.20 sq mi (41.96 km^{2})
  - Water: 0.0077 sq mi (0.02 km^{2})
- Elevation: 226 ft (69 m)

Population (2020)
  - City: 17,756
  - Estimate (2025): 16,609 ▼
  - Density: 1,096.0/sq mi (423.16/km^{2})
  - Metro: 44,170 Arkansas census statistical areas
- Demonym: El Doradoans
- Time zone: UTC-6 (Central (CST))
  - Summer (DST): UTC-5 (CDT)
- ZIP codes: 71730, 71731, 71768
- Area code: 870
- FIPS code: 05-21070
- GNIS feature ID: 2403547
- Website: goeldorado.com

El Dorado (locally /ɛl dʌˈreɪdoʊ/ el durr-AY-doh) is a city in and the county seat of Union County, on the southern border of Arkansas, United States. According to the 2020 census, the population of the city is 17,755. El Dorado's population has an African American majority.

El Dorado is headquarters of the Arkansas Oil and Gas Commission as well as Murphy USA, Deltic Timber Corporation and a DelekUS oil refinery. The city has a downtown arts district, the Murphy Arts District (MAD); a community college, South Arkansas College (SouthArk); and a multi-cultural arts center, South Arkansas Arts Center (SAAC). El Dorado is the population, cultural and business center of south central Arkansas.

The city was the heart of the 1920s oil boom in the area. During World War II, it became a center of the chemical industry, which still plays a part in the economy, as do oil and timber.

== History ==
In 1829, the territorial legislature took sections of Hempstead and Clark counties to establish Union County. Matthew Rainey founded and named El Dorado in 1843. El Dorado became the Union County seat that same year and the first Presbyterian church was organized.

=== Timeline ===
- 1845: The First Baptist Church was organized.
- 1870: El Dorado Baptist Church was founded and El Dorado was incorporated.
- 1883: Albert Williams was lynched in El Dorado.
- 1891: The first passenger train arrived in El Dorado from Camden.
- 1902: The Tucker-Parnell Feud erupted between city marshal Guy Tucker and local businessman Tom Parnell.
- 1908: Booker T. Washington High School opened.
- 1919: Frank Livingston, a Black World War I veteran accused of murder with scant evidence, was burned alive by a mob near El Dorado.
- 1921: The Busey No. 1 well was completed. The oil boom began. El Dorado is sometimes referred to as "Arkansas' Original Boomtown."
- 1922: El Dorado Oil Refinery was commissioned and the B'nai B'rith lodge was founded by Jewish residents.
- 1927: The Lion Oil-Exchange Building was completed.

== Geography ==
According to the United States Census Bureau, the city has a total area of 16.3 square miles (42 km^{2}), of which 16.3 square miles (42 km^{2}) is land and 0.1 square miles (0.26 km^{2}) (0.31%) is water.

=== Topography ===
El Dorado is located in the West Gulf Coastal Plain. In Arkansas, the West Gulf Coastal Plain covers the southeastern and south central portions of the state along the border of Louisiana. This Lowland area of Arkansas is characterized by pine forests and farmlands. Natural resources include natural gas, petroleum deposits and beds of bromine flats. The lowest point in the state is found on the Ouachita River in the West Gulf Coastal Plain.

=== Climate ===
El Dorado is located in the humid subtropical zone (Köppen climate classification: Cfa).

Climate data for El Dorado, Arkansas (South Arkansas Regional Airport at Goodwin Field) (1991–2020 normals, extremes 1892–present)
Month	Jan	Feb	Mar	Apr	May	Jun	Jul	Aug	Sep	Oct	Nov	Dec	Year
Record high °F (°C)	83 (28)	89 (32)	99 (37)	96 (36)	99 (37)	108 (42)	110 (43)	112 (44)	110 (43)	99 (37)	89 (32)	83 (28)	112 (44)
Mean daily maximum °F (°C)	55.9 (13.3)	60.2 (15.7)	68.7 (20.4)	76.4 (24.7)	83.5 (28.6)	90.5 (32.5)	93.6 (34.2)	93.5 (34.2)	88.2 (31.2)	77.6 (25.3)	66.0 (18.9)	58.0 (14.4)	76.0 (24.4)
Daily mean °F (°C)	44.7 (7.1)	48.5 (9.2)	56.3 (13.5)	63.9 (17.7)	72.0 (22.2)	79.3 (26.3)	82.4 (28.0)	81.8 (27.7)	75.8 (24.3)	64.6 (18.1)	53.8 (12.1)	46.8 (8.2)	64.2 (17.9)
Mean daily minimum °F (°C)	33.6 (0.9)	36.8 (2.7)	44.0 (6.7)	51.3 (10.7)	60.5 (15.8)	68.0 (20.0)	71.3 (21.8)	70.2 (21.2)	63.4 (17.4)	51.5 (10.8)	41.6 (5.3)	35.6 (2.0)	52.3 (11.3)
Record low °F (°C)	−10 (−23)	−9 (−23)	11 (−12)	26 (−3)	34 (1)	46 (8)	53 (12)	50 (10)	35 (2)	24 (−4)	9 (−13)	−4 (−20)	−10 (−23)
Average precipitation inches (mm)	4.39 (112)	4.47 (114)	5.10 (130)	5.39 (137)	4.81 (122)	3.88 (99)	3.43 (87)	3.40 (86)	3.23 (82)	4.58 (116)	3.83 (97)	5.61 (142)	52.12 (1,324)
Average precipitation days (≥ 0.01 in)	9.4	9.4	10.3	8.7	10.55	8.6	8.4	7.4	6.3	7.3	8.7	9.3	104.3
Source: NOAA

== Demographics ==
Historical population
Census	Pop.	Note	%±
1880	443		—
1890	455		2.7%
1900	1,857		308.1%
1910	4,202		126.3%
1920	3,887		−7.5%
1930	16,421		322.5%
1940	15,858		−3.4%
1950	23,076		45.5%
1960	25,292		9.6%
1970	25,283		0.0%
1980	25,270		−0.1%
1990	23,146		−8.4%
2000	21,530		−7.0%
2010	18,884		−12.3%
2020	17,756		−6.0%
2025 (est.)	16,609	▼	−6.5%
U.S. Decennial Census

=== Racial and ethnic composition ===
El Dorado city, Arkansas – racial and ethnic composition Note: the US Census treats Hispanic/Latino as an ethnic category. This table excludes Latinos from the racial categories and assigns them to a separate category. Hispanics/Latinos may be of any race.
Race / ethnicity (NH = Non-Hispanic)	Pop 2000	Pop 2010	Pop 2020	% 2000	% 2010	% 2020
White alone (NH)	11,441	8,260	6,868	53.14%	43.74%	38.68%
Black or African American alone (NH)	9,490	9,385	9,029	44.08%	49.70%	50.85%
Native American or Alaska Native alone (NH)	42	48	34	0.20%	0.25%	0.19%
Asian alone (NH)	143	156	210	0.66%	0.83%	1.18%
Native Hawaiian or Pacific Islander alone (NH)	2	5	3	0.01%	0.03%	0.02%
Other race alone (NH)	10	14	65	0.05%	0.07%	0.37%
Mixed-race or multiracial (NH)	178	207	530	0.83%	1.10%	2.98%
Hispanic or Latino (any race)	224	809	1,017	1.04%	4.28%	5.73%
Total	21,530	18,884	17,756	100.00%	100.00%	100.00%

=== 2020 census ===
As of the 2020 census, El Dorado had a population of 17,756. There were 7,375 households and 4,466 families in the city, and the population density was 1,096 people per square mile.

The median age was 39.1 years. 24.3% of residents were under the age of 18, 7.1% were under the age of 5, and 17.9% were 65 years of age or older. For every 100 females there were 88.4 males, and for every 100 females age 18 and over there were 84.9 males age 18 and over.

97.5% of residents lived in urban areas, while 2.5% lived in rural areas.

Of El Dorado's households, 31.5% had children under the age of 18 living in them. Of all households, 33.3% were married-couple households, 21.5% were households with a male householder and no spouse or partner present, and 39.2% were households with a female householder and no spouse or partner present. About 34.2% of all households were made up of individuals and 13.3% had someone living alone who was 65 years of age or older.

There were 8,510 housing units, of which 13.3% were vacant. The homeowner vacancy rate was 2.1% and the rental vacancy rate was 14.2%.

=== Income and poverty ===
The median household income was $41,831, and the per capita income was $24,081. People under the poverty line made up 22.6% of the population.

=== 2010 census ===
As of the census of 2010, there were 18,884 people, 8,969 households, and 5,732 families residing in the city. The population density was 1,323.3 inhabitants per square mile (510.9/km^{2}). There were 9,969 housing units at an average density of 607.9 per square mile (234.7/km^{2}). The racial makeup of the city was 49.9% Black or African American, 45.1% White, 0.30% Native American, 0.71% Asian, 0.8% Pacific Islander, 0.39% from other races, and 0.86% from two or more races. 1.04% of the population were Hispanic or Latino of any race.

There were 8,686 households, out of which 30.7% had children under the age of 18 living with them, 42.9% were married couples living together, 19.1% had a female householder with no husband present, and 34.0% were non-families. Of 8,686 households, 304 are unmarried partner households: 243 heterosexual, 19 same-sex male, and 42 same-sex female. 30.7% of all households were made up of individuals, and 13.6% had someone living alone who was 65 years of age or older. The average household size was 2.40 and the average family size was 2.99.

In the city, the population was spread out, with 26.3% under the age of 18, 8.4% from 18 to 24, 25.9% from 25 to 44, 21.1% from 45 to 64, and 18.3% who were 65 years of age or older. The median age was 38 years. For every 100 females, there were 85.7 males. For every 100 females age 18 and over, there were 78.8 males.

The median income for a household in the city was $27,045, and the median income for a family was $34,753. Males had a median income of $30,876 versus $19,211 for females. The per capita income for the city was $16,332. About 20.0% of families and 24.6% of the population were below the poverty line, including 36.3% of those under age 18 and 13.8% of those age 65 or over.

== Arts and culture ==
=== Venues ===
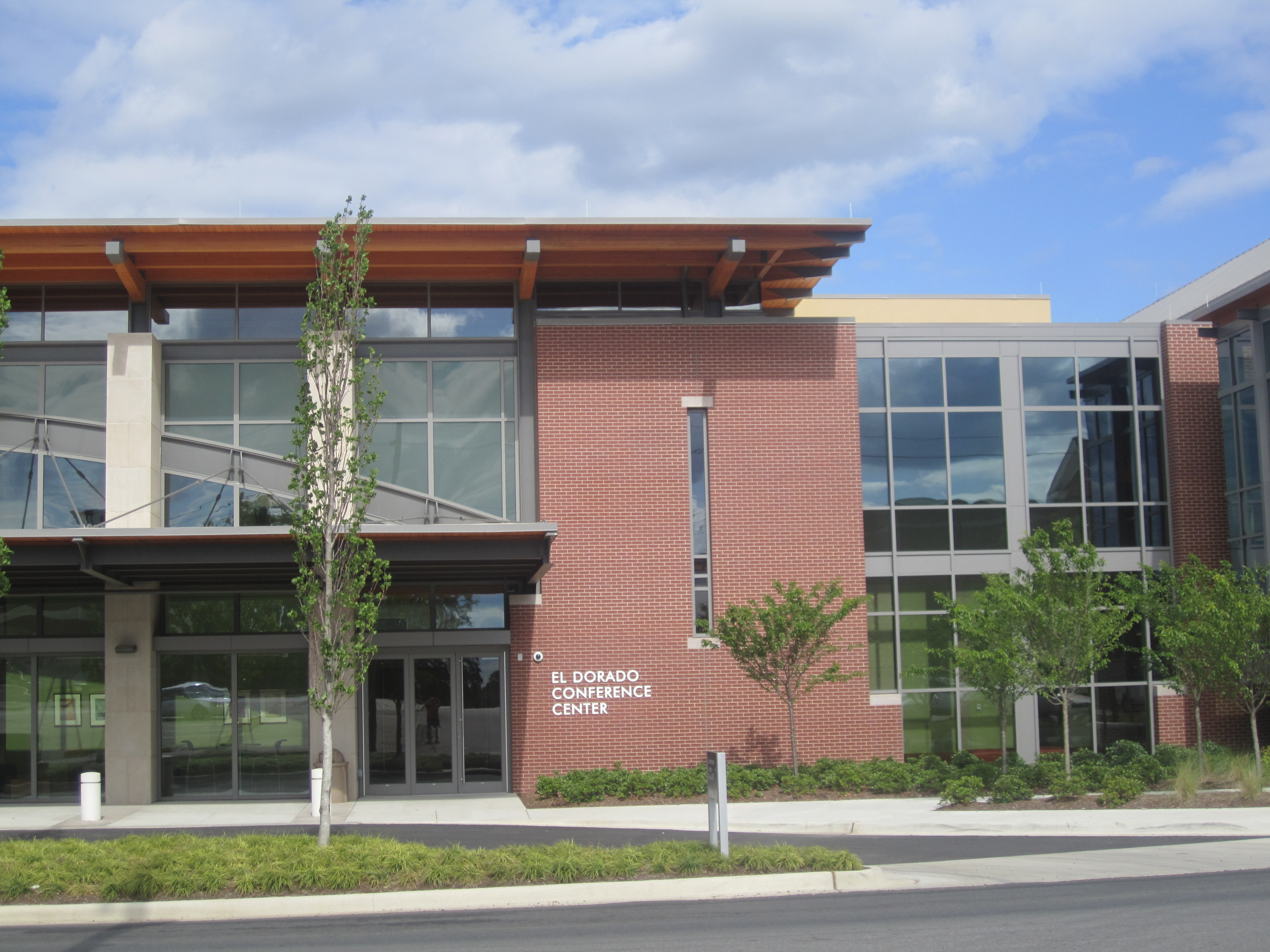
El Dorado Conference Center

The Murphy Arts District (MAD) opened in 2017 in downtown El Dorado. The district includes a music hall, outdoor amphitheater, farmer's market, musical performers, restaurant with performance stage, the largest playscape in the state, and a water park.

The South Arkansas Arts Center (SAAC) is a 22,500-square-foot (2,090 m^{2}) facility with three visual art galleries, a ballet studio, a theatre, educational classroom space, and an open art studio. SAAC hosts stage events and art exhibitions.

The El Dorado Municipal Auditorium is a multi-purpose auditorium with a large lobby, grand hall seating, and multi-tiered sloping balcony. It has featured musical acts, entertainment shows, school productions, and dance recitals. It was formerly the location of the South Arkansas Symphony Orchestra, which was founded in 1956.

The El Dorado Conference Center is a 50,764-square-foot (4,716.1 m^{2}) multi-purpose facility opened in 2011, which features an assembly hall, small meeting rooms, student services for South Arkansas College, bookstore, and café.

=== Annual events ===
The Mayhaw Festival occurs in May. The official event name is "Bugs Bands and Bikes". It coincides with a crawfish boil, a "Battle of the Bands", a bike show/one day motorcycle rally, a motorcycle parade, and pool tournament.

The SouthArk Outdoor Expo occurs in September with activities for anglers, hunters, children, and families.

MusicFest occurs in October in an eight-block area, featuring over 30 acts on five stages.

Winter events include the "Festival of Lights" and the "largest Christmas parade in Arkansas".

=== Attractions ===
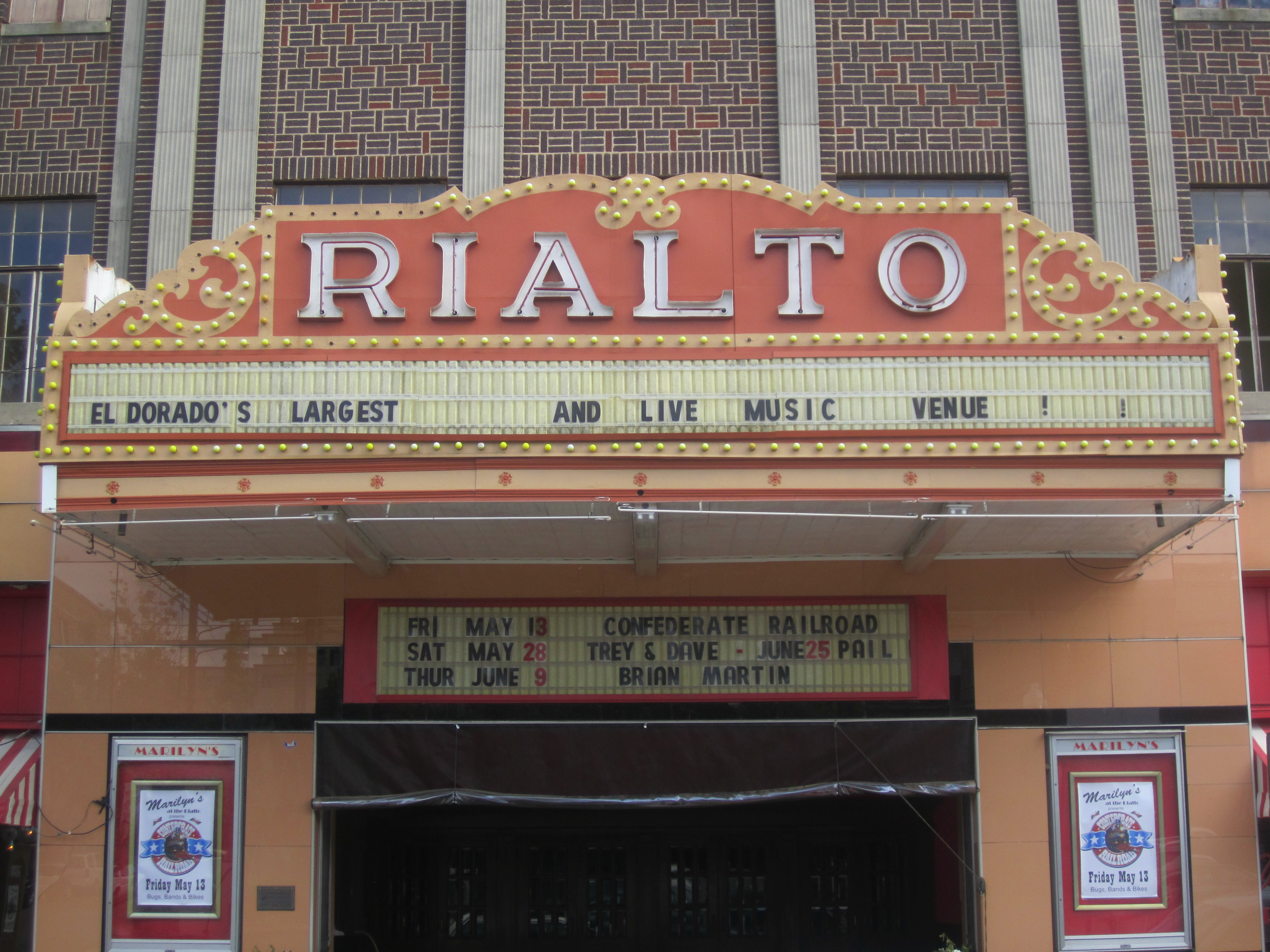
Rialto Theater

- The Union County Courthouse, opened in 1928
- The South Arkansas Arboretum, opened in 1965, is Arkansas's only state park located within a city. It includes more than 2 mi (3.2 km) of paved trails.
- The Rialto Theater, listed on the National Register of Historic Places, opened in 1929 with seating for 1,400, and presented live stage shows and films.

== Parks and recreation ==
City parks include Lions Club Park and Golf Course, Mattocks Park, Mosby Park, Neel Park, Old City Park, and South Side Park.

The El Dorado Recreation Complex and Pavilion has a playground, baseball and softball facility, and two pavilions. It is the location of the El Dorado High School Wildcat Baseball Field and Ladycat Softball Field.

Memorial Stadium is a 7,030-seat football stadium and track which hosts sports events and the Boomtown Classic, an annual college football match between in-state college football rivals.

== Education ==
According to the 2000 Census, 22.5% of the population age 25+ had an associate degree or higher.

Approximately 50 percent of the 400 teachers and administrators hold advanced degrees.

More than 4,600 students attend the nine El Dorado public schools in the El Dorado School District #15. A new high school with a 1500-student capacity was completed in June 2011.

=== Public ===
==== Elementary ====
There are five elementary schools in the district, divided into academies (K-4) and 1 (K-6):

- Hugh Goodwin Elementary School of the Arts
- Murmil Heights learning center
- Northwest Elementary School of Environment
- Retta Brown Elementary School of Communication and Technologies
- Yocum Elementary School of Math and Science

==== Secondary ====
- Washington Middle School (5–6)
- Barton Junior High School (7–8)
- El Dorado High School (9–12)

==== Collegiate ====
South Arkansas Community College is a public two-year institution providing educational programs, services, and resources for students. SouthArk offers degrees and certificates in health sciences, industrial technologies, liberal arts, and business.

=== Private ===
- Maranatha Baptist Christian School (PK-12)
- West Side Christian School (PK-12)
- Light Brigade Christian Academy (PK-12)
- Holy Redeemer School (1925–2005)

== Media ==
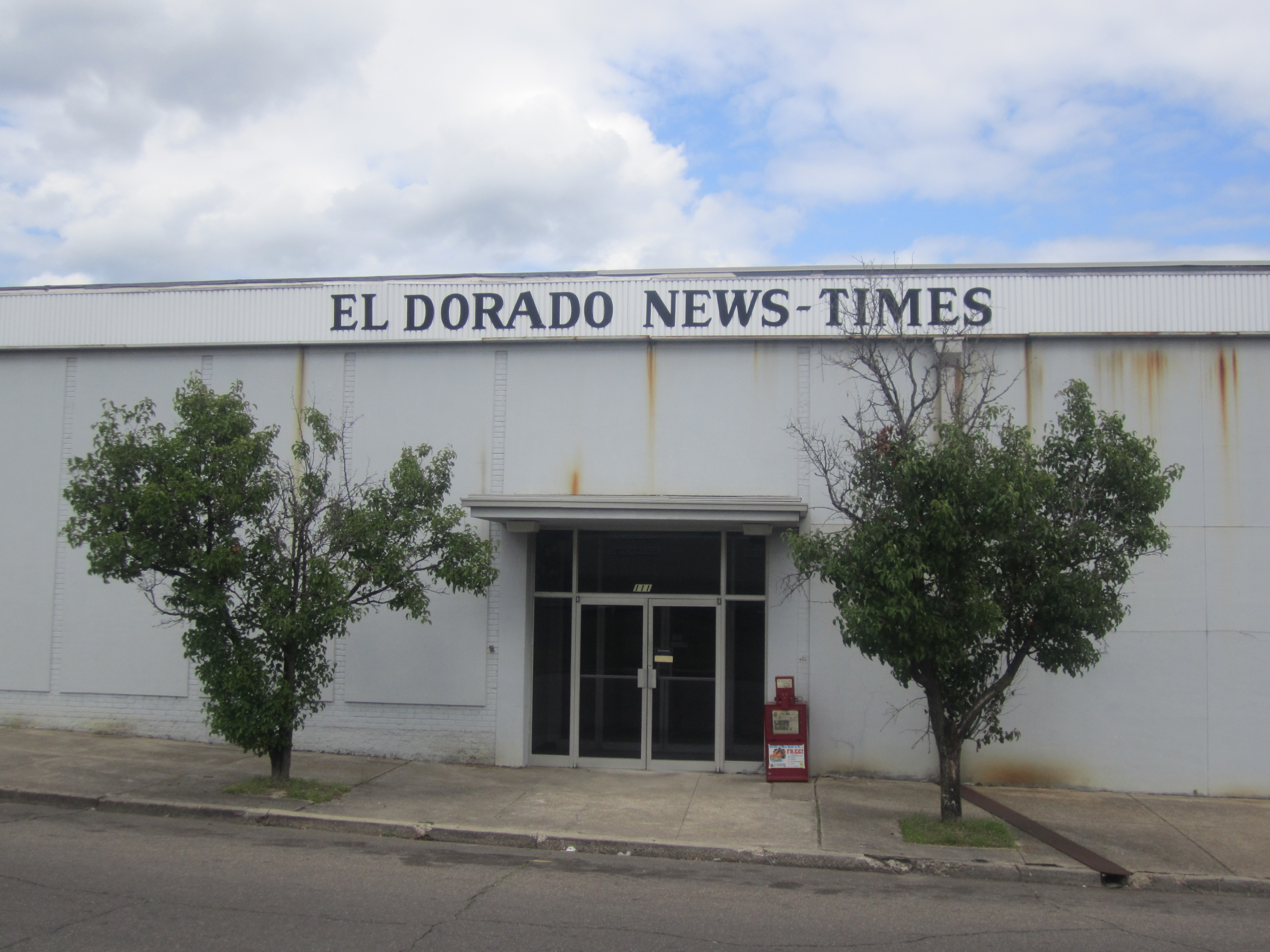
El Dorado News-Times office

=== Radio ===
Radio stations include: KMLK (urban adult contemporary), KDMS (southern gospel), KIXB (country), KMRX (classic hits), KAGL (classic rock), KELD (talk), KELD-FM (contemporary hits), KLBQ (classic country), KBSA (NPR), and KAKV.

=== Television ===
Television stations serving El Dorado include KTVE (NBC), KETZ (PBS), K20OC (CBS-HD), KTVE-HD (NBC-HD), K20OC (CBS), KETZ-DT (AETN/PBS), KTBS (ABC), KNOE (CBS), KARD (FOX), and KMLU (MeTV).

=== Print ===
The El Dorado News-Times is one of the oldest newspapers in South Arkansas.

== Infrastructure ==
=== Major highways ===
- Future Interstate 69
- U.S. Highway 63
- U.S. Highway 82
- U.S. Highway 167
- Highway 7
- Highway 15

=== Airports ===
El Dorado has two airports, both owned by the city. South Arkansas Regional Airport at Goodwin Field services private aircraft and one commercial carrier, and El Dorado Downtown Airport services local industries, and offers hangar space to small private planes.

=== Railways ===
El Dorado is served by the Union Pacific Railroad, as well as two shortlines, the El Dorado and Wesson Railway and the Ouachita Railroad.

=== Utilities ===
El Dorado water is served locally by El Dorado Water Utilities, a private company. Electricity is supplied by Entergy of Arkansas. Other utility companies serving El Dorado include Summit Utilities (natural gas), Southern Lp-Gas (liquid gas), Bcs (bottled and metered gas), Suddenlink (cable TV, internet and phone), Verizon Wireless and AT&T (residential and wireless phone service).

=== Health systems ===
The city and surrounding area is served by the Medical Center of South Arkansas, MCSA, accredited by the Joint Commission on the Accreditation of Healthcare Organizations, is a general acute-care hospital licensed by the Arkansas Department of Health.

== Notable people ==
- Michael Aiken, chancellor of the University of Illinois Urbana-Champaign
- Beryl Anthony Jr., member of the United States House of Representatives
- Donna Axum, 1964 Miss America
- Lou Brock, member of Baseball Hall of Fame
- Albert H. Crews, astronaut and United States Air Force officer
- Charlie Daniels, politician
- Glenn D. Daniels, 1936–1992, founder of Country Music Television
- Candice Earley, actress
- Michael G. Fitzgerald, film historian and author
- David Frizzell, country music singer
- Lefty Frizzell, country music singer, born in Corsicana, Texas, reared in El Dorado
- Daniel Gafford, NBA center for the Dallas Mavericks
- Hogan Gidley, White House deputy press secretary 2019–2020
- Glen Ray Hines, professional football player
- Lamar Hunt, professional football player, businessman, owner of Kansas City Chiefs, member of Pro Football Hall of Fame
- Qui Nguyen, playwright, screenwriter, and director, known for Vampire Cowboys Theatre Company, and Raya and the Last Dragon
- Shara Nova, lead singer of My Brightest Diamond
- Kevin Payne, NFL strong safety for the Carolina Panthers
- Charles Portis, author of True Grit
- William Ragsdale, actor
- Albert Rust, U.S. representative
- Rob Schroeder, racing driver
- Adam Setliff, two-time Olympic discus thrower
- Dorothy Geneva Styles, composer, mathematician, and poet
- Reece Tatum, basketball player for Harlem Globetrotters
- Viper, rapper and record producer
- Dave Whitlock, light heavyweight professional prizefighter
- Travis Williams, NFL running back
- Josh Wilson, contemporary Christian musician

== See also ==
- List of cities and towns in Arkansas
- National Register of Historic Places listings in Union County, Arkansas
