= KLAZ =

Radio station in Hot Springs, Arkansas

- Hot Springs, Arkansas; United States
- Frequency: 105.9 MHz
- Branding: 105.9 KLAZ

Programming
- Format: Top 40 (CHR)
- Affiliations: Premiere Networks

Ownership
- Owner: US Stations, LLC
- Sister stations: KZNG, KLXQ, KQUS-FM, KLBL

History
- First air date: 1977 (as KXOW)
- Former call signs: KXOW (5/1979-11/1979); KACQ (1979–1986)

Technical information
- Licensing authority: FCC
- Facility ID: 48947
- Class: C1
- ERP: 95,000 watts
- HAAT: 303.0 meters
- Transmitter coordinates: 34°22′20″N 93°2′51″W

Links
- Public license information: Public file; LMS
- Webcast: Listen Live
- Website: klaz.com

KLAZ (105.9 FM) is a 100kw radio station broadcasting a Top 40 (CHR) format first broadcasting in 1977. The station serves the Hot Springs, Arkansas & Central Arkansas area. The station was owned by Central Arkansas Radio Group, LLC until December 7, 2016, when it was purchased by US Stations, LLC.

Michael Dean & Jennifer Bailey are the cohosts of the KLAZ Breakfast Scramble Morning Show. Jarrett Jackson covers the midday shift. Jennifer Bailey handles afternoon drive time.

This was the station where nationally syndicated radio host Bobby Bones got his start in radio.
