= KLXQ =

Coordinates: 34.404°N 93.121°W

- Hot Springs, Arkansas; United States
- Broadcast area: Hot Springs, Arkansas
- Frequency: 96.7 MHz
- Branding: 96.7 The Rocket

Programming
- Format: Classic rock
- Affiliations: United Stations Radio Networks

Ownership
- Owner: US Stations, LLC
- Sister stations: KZNG, KQUS-FM, KLBL, KLAZ

History
- First air date: June 18, 1965
- Former call signs: KBHS (1988–1991); KBMB (1991–1992); KLXQ (1992–2002); KYDL (2002–2009); KHTO (2009–2016)

Technical information
- Licensing authority: FCC
- Facility ID: 33874
- Class: A
- ERP: 940 watts
- HAAT: 246 meters (807 ft)

Links
- Public license information: Public file; LMS
- Webcast: Listen Live
- Website: KLXQ Online

KLXQ (96.7 FM) is a classic rock music station in Hot Springs, Arkansas. It broadcasts with an ERP of 940 watts from its broadcast tower on Mount Riante, south of Hot Springs in Garland County, Arkansas, where it shares space with sister station KQUS.

KLXQ is owned and operated by US Stations, LLC, a local company that also owns KZNG, KQUS, and KLAZ in Hot Springs, Arkansas and KLBL in Malvern, Arkansas.

== History ==
On August 10, 2016 at 6 pm, KHTO changed their format from contemporary hit radio to a simulcast of classic rock-formatted KLXQ 101.9 FM, branded as "101.9 and 96.7 The Rocket".

On November 16, 2016, KHTO rebranded as "96.7 The Rocket" when KHTO's simulcast with KLXQ 101.9 FM (which began stunting) ended.

On December 14, 2016, KHTO changed their call letters to KLXQ.
