= KLBL =

- Malvern, Arkansas; United States
- Broadcast area: Hot Springs, Arkansas
- Frequency: 101.5 MHz
- Branding: Kool 101.5

Programming
- Format: Classic hits
- Affiliations: Jones Radio Network

Ownership
- Owner: US Stations, LLC
- Sister stations: KZNG, KLXQ, KQUS-FM, KLAZ

History
- First air date: 1991 (as KISI)
- Former call signs: KISI (1989–2003); KLEZ (2003–2009); KIXV (2009–2013); KHRK (2013–2016)
- Call sign meaning: K L BulL (from previous format)

Technical information
- Licensing authority: FCC
- Facility ID: 39368
- Class: A
- ERP: 6,000 watts
- HAAT: 98 meters
- Transmitter coordinates: 34°28′24″N 92°55′51″W

Links
- Public license information: Public file; LMS
- Website: KLBL Online

KLBL (101.5 FM, "Kool 101.5") is a radio station broadcasting a classic hits format. Licensed to Malvern, Arkansas, United States, it serves the Hot Springs, Arkansas and Hot Springs Village, Arkansas area. The station is currently owned by US Stations, LLC.

== History ==
On December 7, 2016, KHRK was sold from Central Arkansas Radio Group, LLC to US Stations, LLC and changed their format from classic hits to classic country branded as "101.5 The Bull". "The Bull" branding was formerly held on 104.5 Pearcy. The classic hits format was moved to 101.9 Mountain Pine and 104.5 Pearcy.

On December 14, 2016, KHRK changed their call letters to KLBL.
