= KTKC (AM) =

- Springhill, Louisiana; United States
- Frequency: 1460 kHz
- Branding: Red de Radio Amistad

Programming
- Language: Spanish
- Format: Christian

Ownership
- Owner: Houston Christian Broadcasters, Inc.
- Sister stations: KSPH, KHCB-FM, KHCB, KHCH

History
- First air date: June 30, 1954
- Former call signs: KBSF (1954–2010)

Technical information
- Licensing authority: FCC
- Facility ID: 62035
- Class: B
- Power: 1,000 watts (day); 220 watts (night)
- Transmitter coordinates: 33°0′28″N 93°28′43″W
- Translator: 107.9 K300DQ (Springhill)

Links
- Public license information: Public file; LMS
- Website: radioamistad.net

KTKC (1460 AM) is an American radio station broadcasting a Spanish language Christian format, relaying programming from primary station KHCB League City, Texas. Licensed to Springhill, Louisiana, United States, the station is currently owned by Houston Christian Broadcasters, Inc.
