= KZNG =

Radio station in Hot Springs, Arkansas

Coordinates: 34°29′43″N 93°01′27″W

- Hot Springs, Arkansas; United States
- Frequency: 1340 kHz
- Branding: Oldies Radio KZNG

Programming
- Format: Oldies
- Affiliations: Compass Media Networks; Premiere Networks

Ownership
- Owner: US Stations, LLC
- Sister stations: KLXQ, KQUS-FM, KLBL, KLAZ

History
- First air date: February 10, 1954
- Former call signs: KBLO (1954–1961); KZNG (1961–1981); KWBO (1981–1982)

Technical information
- Licensing authority: FCC
- Facility ID: 16570
- Class: C
- Power: 1,000 watts unlimited
- Translators: 97.9 K250CE (Hot Springs); 105.5 K288FP (Hot Springs)

Links
- Public license information: Public file; LMS
- Website: www.myhotsprings.com/oldiesradiokzng/

KZNG (1340 AM) is an oldies radio station in Hot Springs, Arkansas. It broadcasts with an ERP of 1 kW (1000 watts) from its broadcast tower near downtown Hot Springs.

KZNG is owned and operated by US Stations, LLC, a local company that also owns KLXQ, KQUS and KLAZ in Hot Springs, Arkansas and KLBL in Malvern, Arkansas. US Stations maintains studios at 125 Corporate Terrace, a building constructed for KRZB-TV (channel 26) in 1986 and expanded in 2006.

It broadcast on 1470 AM from its launch in 1954 until 1967 when it moved to its current frequency, 1340 AM.
