= KASZ =

- White Hall, Arkansas; United States
- Broadcast area: Pine Bluff
- Frequency: 1190 kHz
- Branding: Arkansas Rocks

Programming
- Format: Classic rock

Ownership
- Owner: Broadcast Industry Group, LLC
- Sister stations: KLRG, KAFN

History
- First air date: 2008
- Former call signs: KJJI (2008–2023)

Technical information
- Licensing authority: FCC
- Facility ID: 161393
- Class: B
- Power: 25,000 watts (day); 350 watts (night)
- Transmitter coordinates: 34°17′01″N 92°07′40″W
- Translator: 98.9 K255AX (Pine Bluff)

Links
- Public license information: Public file; LMS
- Webcast: Listen live
- Website: www.arkansasrocks.com

KASZ (1190 AM) is an American radio station broadcasting a classic rock format. It is licensed to White Hall, Arkansas, and serves the Pine Bluff area. The station is owned by Charles and Devon Brentlinger, through licensee Broadcast Industry Group, LLC. When it first signed on, it aired a gospel format.

In 2020, the station was featured in a segment of Music Madness in the Northwest Arkansas Democrat Gazette. The station was singled out for its lack of advertising and playing album cuts. It was once a part of the High Plains Radio Network before being sold.

Under its former calls, KJJI, the station joined a network of other stations in Arkansas carrying "Arkasas Rocks", which began expanding in 2023.
