= KLRG =

- Sheridan, Arkansas; United States
- Broadcast area: Little Rock
- Frequency: 880 kHz
- Branding: Arkansas Rocks

Programming
- Format: Classic rock

Ownership
- Owner: Charles Brentlinger and Devon Brentlinger; (Broadcast Industry Group, LLC)
- Sister stations: KASZ

History
- First air date: 1982 (as KKDI)
- Former call signs: KKDI (1982–1988); KGHT (1988–2009)
- Call sign meaning: K Little Rock Giant

Technical information
- Licensing authority: FCC
- Facility ID: 14053
- Class: D
- Power: 50,000 watts day 31,000 watts critical hours 220 watts night
- Transmitter coordinates: 34°41′36.3″N 92°18′21.5″W (day and critical hours); 34°18′21.3″N 92°23′6.6″W (night)
- Translator: 94.5 K233BF (Greenbrier)

Links
- Public license information: Public file; LMS
- Webcast: Listen live
- Website: arkansasrocks.com

KLRG (880 AM) is an American radio station broadcasting a classic rock format. It is licensed to Sheridan, Arkansas, and serves the Little Rock Metro area from its transmitter located 5 Miles from the Arkansas state capitol. The station is owned by Charles and Devon Brentlinger, through licensee Broadcast Industry Group, LLC.

== History ==
KLRG was formerly a gospel station owned by Joe Kinlow and Family until his death in 2015. Prior formats include the Tan Talk Radio Network, and as Country station KKDI owned by Cliff Packer from Benton, Arkansas.

The station was first licensed in 1982, and held the callsign KKDI. The station originally broadcast on 1540 kHz with a power of 250 watts, and operated during daytime hours only.

== Technical ==
KLRG has separate transmitter sites for day/critical hours and night. It has been granted a U.S. Federal Communications Commission construction permit to move the night site to the day/critical hours site and decrease night power to 200 watts.
