= KCAT =

- Pine Bluff, Arkansas; United States
- Frequency: 1340 kHz
- Branding: The Cat

Programming
- Format: Urban oldies

Ownership
- Owner: Jay and Devon Brentlinger; (Broadcast Industry Group, LLC)

History
- First air date: April 1963 (on 1530 AM)

Technical information
- Licensing authority: FCC
- Facility ID: 30138
- Class: C
- Power: 1,000 watts unlimited
- Transmitter coordinates: 34°12′47″N 92°1′53″W
- Translator: 92.7 K224FN (Pine Bluff)

Links
- Public license information: Public file; LMS
- Webcast: Listen live
- Website: kcatradio.com

KCAT (1340 AM, The Cat) is a radio station broadcasting an urban oldies format. Licensed to Pine Bluff, Arkansas, United States. The station is currently owned by Jay and Devon Brentlinger, through licensee Broadcast Industry Group, LLC.

== History ==
Before airing its urban gospel format, KCAT aired an urban contemporary format.

On March 22, 2021, KCAT changed their format from gospel to urban oldies, branded as "The Cat".
