= KLBQ (FM) =

- Junction City, Arkansas; United States
- Broadcast area: El Dorado, Arkansas
- Frequency: 101.5 MHz
- Branding: 101.5 The Ark

Programming
- Format: Contemporary christian
- Affiliations: Westwood One

Ownership
- Owner: Noalmark Broadcasting Corporation
- Sister stations: KELD (AM), KAGL, KMRX, KIXB, KELD-FM

History
- First air date: 2000; 26 years ago
- Former call signs: KHBX (1998–2000, CP); KMLK (2000–2017)

Technical information
- Licensing authority: FCC
- Facility ID: 85169
- Class: A
- ERP: 4,500 watts
- HAAT: 114 meters
- Transmitter coordinates: 32°56′10″N 92°37′29″W

Links
- Public license information: Public file; LMS

KLBQ (101.5 FM, "101.5 The Ark"), is an American radio station broadcasting a contemporary christian music format. Licensed to Junction City, Arkansas, United States, the station serves the El Dorado, Arkansas area. The station is currently owned by Noalmark Broadcasting Corporation and features programming from ABC Radio.

== History ==
The station went on the air as KHBX on July 17, 1998. On August 31, 2000, the station changed its call sign to KMLK. The station moved its community of license from El Dorado to Junction City on April 21, 2017.

The station founder was Jerome Orr, who had worked for Noalmark at KELD, El Dorado and at Hobbs. Orr had recently been managing the company's then KIOL in Midland/Odessa.

On July 13, 2017, KMLK and its urban adult contemporary format moved to 98.7 FM El Dorado, swapping frequencies and call signs with country-formatted KLBQ. On August 5, 2025, KLBQ-FM changed its format from classic country to contemporary christian, branded as "101.5 The Ark".
