= KBHS =

Radio station in Hot Springs, Arkansas

- Hot Springs, Arkansas; United States
- Frequency: 1420 kHz
- Branding: 1420 La Zeta

Programming
- Format: Regional Mexican

Ownership
- Owner: La Zeta 957 Inc.

History
- First air date: 1966

Technical information
- Licensing authority: FCC
- Facility ID: 48948
- Class: D
- Power: 5,000 watts (day); 87 watts (night)
- Transmitter coordinates: 34°27′19″N 93°3′26″W

Links
- Public license information: Public file; LMS

KBHS (106.3FM/1420 AM) La Caliente 106.3 is a Regional Mexican radio station serving and licensed to Hot Springs, Arkansas, United States. The station is currently owned by La Zeta 957 Inc.

The frequency was previously occupied by KXOW
