= KHCH =

Coordinates: 30°42′54″N 95°31′42″W

- Huntsville, Texas; United States
- Broadcast area: Huntsville, Dodge
- Frequency: 1410 kHz
- Branding: Red de Radio Amistad

Programming
- Languages: Spanish, Vietnamese, Cantonese, Mandarin
- Format: Christian Radio

Ownership
- Owner: Houston Christian Broadcasters, Inc.
- Sister stations: KHCB-FM, KHCB, KTKC

History
- First air date: August 5, 1983 (as KKNX)
- Call sign meaning: Houston Christian Broadcasters (owner) Huntsville; or backronym; Keeping Him Close By (slogan) in Huntsville

Technical information
- Licensing authority: FCC
- Facility ID: 30274
- Class: D
- Power: 250 watts day 87 watts night
- Translator: See § Translator

Links
- Public license information: Public file; LMS
- Website: www.khcb.org

KHCH (1410 AM, 98.7 FM) is an Ethnic Christian radio station, relayed by an FM translator, licensed to Huntsville, Texas. KHCH broadcasts in the languages of Spanish, Vietnamese, Cantonese, and Mandarin, and is owned by Houston Christian Broadcasters, Inc.

The station first began broadcasting on August 5, 1983 under the call sign KKNX. It was established to serve the Huntsville and Dodge areas of Texas. During its early years, the station underwent several changes in programming before being acquired by its current owners.

In the 1990s, the station was acquired by Houston Christian Broadcasters, Inc., a non-profit organization that operates a network of Christian radio stations. Following the acquisition, the call letters were changed to KHCH. The call sign is often associated with the slogan "Keeping Him Close By," which aligns with the parent network's branding.

KHCH operates as an Ethnic Christian station, providing a diverse range of religious programming. Unlike many local stations that broadcast exclusively in English or Spanish, KHCH is known for its multi-language format. The station broadcasts content in Spanish, Vietnamese, Cantonese, and Mandarin. It is a primary outlet for the Red de Radio Amistad (Friendship Radio Network), the Spanish-language arm of Houston Christian Broadcasters.

KHCH broadcasts on a frequency of 1410 kHz with a power output of 250 watts during the day and 87 watts at night. The station is classified as a Class D AM station. To improve its coverage in the Huntsville area, the station utilizes an FM translator, K254BC, which broadcasts on 98.7 MHz.

== Translator ==
Broadcast translator for KHCH
Call sign	Frequency	City of license	FID	ERP (W)	HAAT	Class	FCC info	Notes
K254BC	98.7 FM	Huntsville, Texas	141206	205	89.7 m (294 ft)	D	LMS	First air date: June 13, 2008
