= KHCB-FM =

Christian radio station in Houston

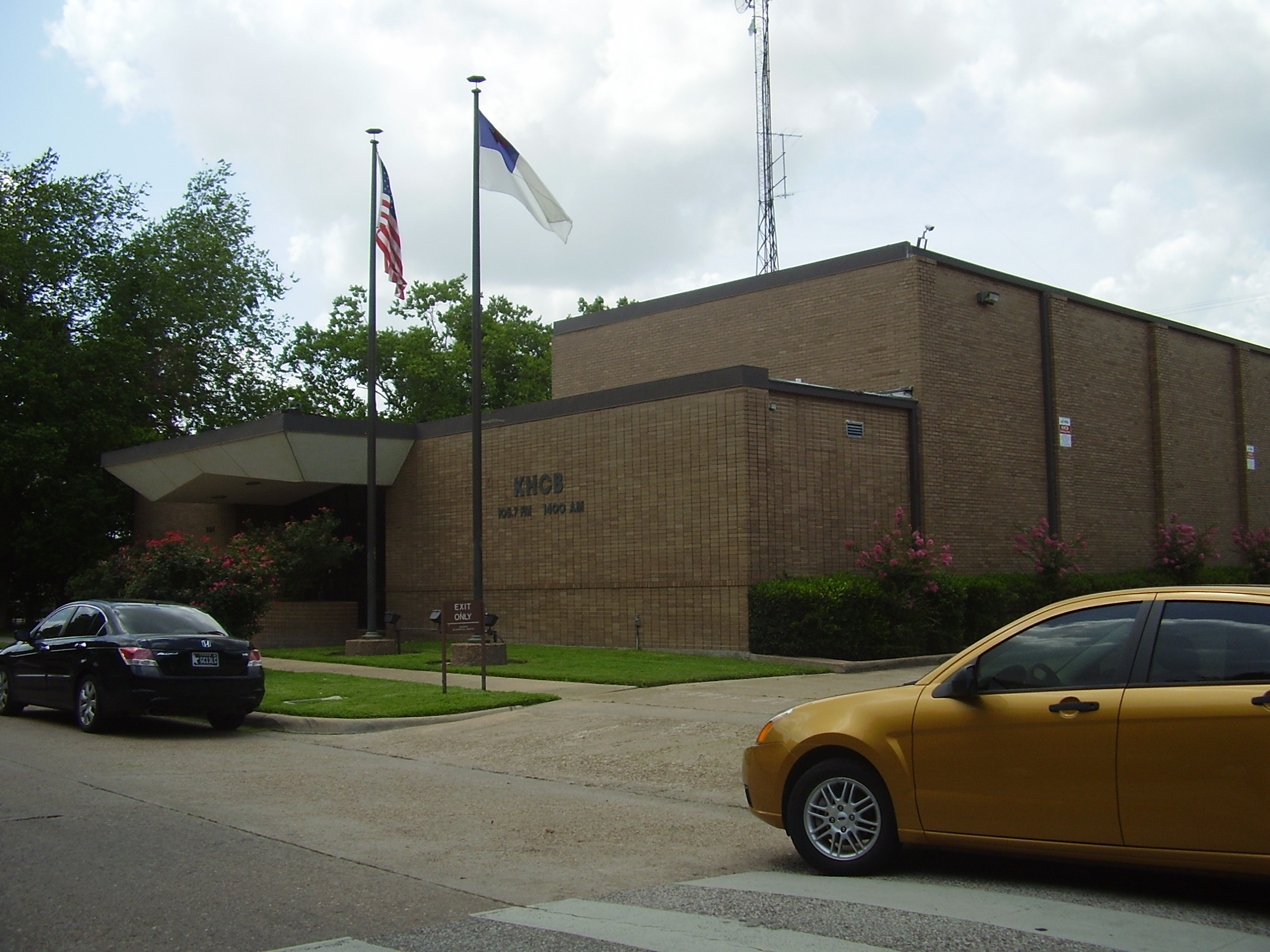
- KHCB & KHCB-FM station offices
- Houston, Texas; United States
- Broadcast area: Greater Houston
- Frequency: 105.7 MHz
- Branding: KHCB Radio Network

Programming
- Format: Christian radio
- Network: SRN News

Ownership
- Owner: Houston Christian Broadcasters, Inc.
- Sister stations: KHCB, KHCH

History
- First air date: March 9, 1962
- Call sign meaning: Houston Christian Broadcasters (also their slogan, Keeping Him Close By)

Technical information
- Licensing authority: FCC
- Facility ID: 27702
- Class: C
- ERP: 100,000 watts
- HAAT: 492 m (1,614 ft)
- Transmitter coordinates: 29°34′6″N 95°29′57″W
- Translator: See § Translators
- Repeater: See § Repeaters

Links
- Public license information: Public file; LMS
- Webcast: Listen live
- Website: www.khcb.org

KHCB-FM (105.7 MHz) is a non-commercial radio station in Houston, Texas, broadcasting a Christian radio format. It is owned by Houston Christian Broadcasters, Inc., a non-profit organization. The studios and offices are on South Boulevard in Houston. It has always been a Christian station, signing on the air on March 9, 1962.

KHCB-FM has an effective radiated power (ERP) of 100,000 watts, non-directional the maximum for most FM stations. The transmitter is on Plaisance Road in Missouri City, co-located with the tower for KPRC-TV. KHCB-FM serves as the flagship station for a network of dozens of stations and translators.

== Network of stations ==
KHCB-FM is carried on a network of full-powered stations that are owned by Houston Christian Broadcasters, Inc., as well as many low powered FM translators.

=== Repeaters ===
Call sign	Frequency	City of license	State	Facility ID	Class	ERP (W)	Height (m (ft))
KPWA	93.5 FM	Bismarck	Arkansas	170989	C3	11,500	147 m (482 ft)
KHHS	104.5 FM	Pearcy	Arkansas	8149	A	4,100	121 m (397 ft)
KHCL	92.5 FM	Arcadia	Louisiana	84058	A	6,000	100 m (330 ft)
KHMD	104.7 FM	Mansfield	Louisiana	17811	C3	25,000	100 m (330 ft)
WNSS	89.3 FM	Palm Coast	Florida	175730	A	4,000	43 m (141 ft)
KRGL	98.5 FM	Ringgold	Louisiana	184850	C3	25,000	87 m (285 ft)
KSPH	92.9 FM	Springhill	Louisiana	62034	C2	40,000	167 m (548 ft)
KFXU	90.5 FM	Chickasha	Oklahoma	87937	C3	10,000	98 m (322 ft)
KFXH	88.7 FM	Marlow	Oklahoma	175816	A	2,150	111 m (364 ft)
KFXT	90.7 FM	Sulphur	Oklahoma	60510	C3	7,000	91 m (299 ft)
KHIB	88.5 FM	Bastrop	Texas	85291	A	4,000	94 m (308 ft)
KHVT	91.5 FM	Bloomington	Texas	89111	C2	46,000	147 m (482 ft)
KHLK	104.3 FM	Brownfield	Texas	61581	C2	50,000	145 m (476 ft)
KHBW	91.7 FM	Brownwood	Texas	78801	A	420	148 m (486 ft)
KMPN	95.9 FM	Burnet	Texas	184541	C3	25,000	96.9 m (318 ft)
KALD	91.9 FM	Caldwell	Texas	91682	C2	30,000	118 m (387 ft)
KRTG	88.3 FM	Carthage	Texas	173351	C3	14,000	135 m (443 ft)
KDER	99.3 FM	Comstock	Texas	191569	C2	50,000	103 m (338 ft)
KDVY	93.5 FM	Crockett	Texas	3526	C2	50,000	150 m (490 ft)
KBLC	91.5 FM	Fredericksburg	Texas	90113	A	3,100	120 m (390 ft)
KANJ	91.1 FM	Giddings	Texas	72440	A	450	102 m (335 ft)
KHCJ	91.9 FM	Jefferson	Texas	83429	A	3,200	140 m (460 ft)
KKER	88.7 FM	Kerrville	Texas	84182	C1	52,000	174 m (571 ft)
KHML	91.5 FM	Madisonville	Texas	83276	C1	95,000	104 m (341 ft)
KHCP	89.3 FM	Paris	Texas	86791	C3	21,000	108 m (354 ft)
KHPO	91.9 FM	Port O'Connor	Texas	92737	A	4,000	94 m (308 ft)
KSAO	93.9 FM	San Angelo	Texas	14517	C1	100,000	198 m (650 ft)
KHPS	88.9 FM	Uvalde	Texas	173349	C3	6,200	109.3 m (359 ft)
KHTA	92.5 FM	Wake Village	Texas	87371	C3	25,000	100 m (330 ft)

=== Translators ===
Call sign	Frequency	City of license	State	Facility ID	Class	ERP (W)	Rebroadcasts
K204DL	88.7 FM	Natchitoches	Louisiana	92658	D	170	KHMD
K234AY	94.7 FM	Ruston	Louisiana	144586	D	140	KHCL
K245BA	96.9 FM	Shreveport	Louisiana	140158	D	170	KHCB-FM
K285GD	104.9 FM	Beaumont	Texas	140122	D	92	KHCB-FM
K267BT	101.3 FM	Bryan	Texas	27704	D	250	KALD
K290CD	105.9 FM	Huntsville	Texas	150718	D	250	KDVY
K202EA	88.3 FM	Lockhart	Texas	78194	D	250	KHCB-FM
K246CB	97.1 FM	Longview	Texas	140154	D	55	KHCB-FM
K240EO	95.9 FM	Lufkin	Texas	156974	D	75	KHCB-FM
K215FD	90.9 FM	Round Rock	Texas	87390	D	75	KHCB-FM
K203CX	88.5 FM	San Marcos	Texas	83024	D	62	KHCB-FM
K294BW	106.7 FM	Vidor	Texas	140140	D	250	KHCB-FM
