= KHCB (AM) =

Spanish-language Christian radio station in League City, Texas, United States

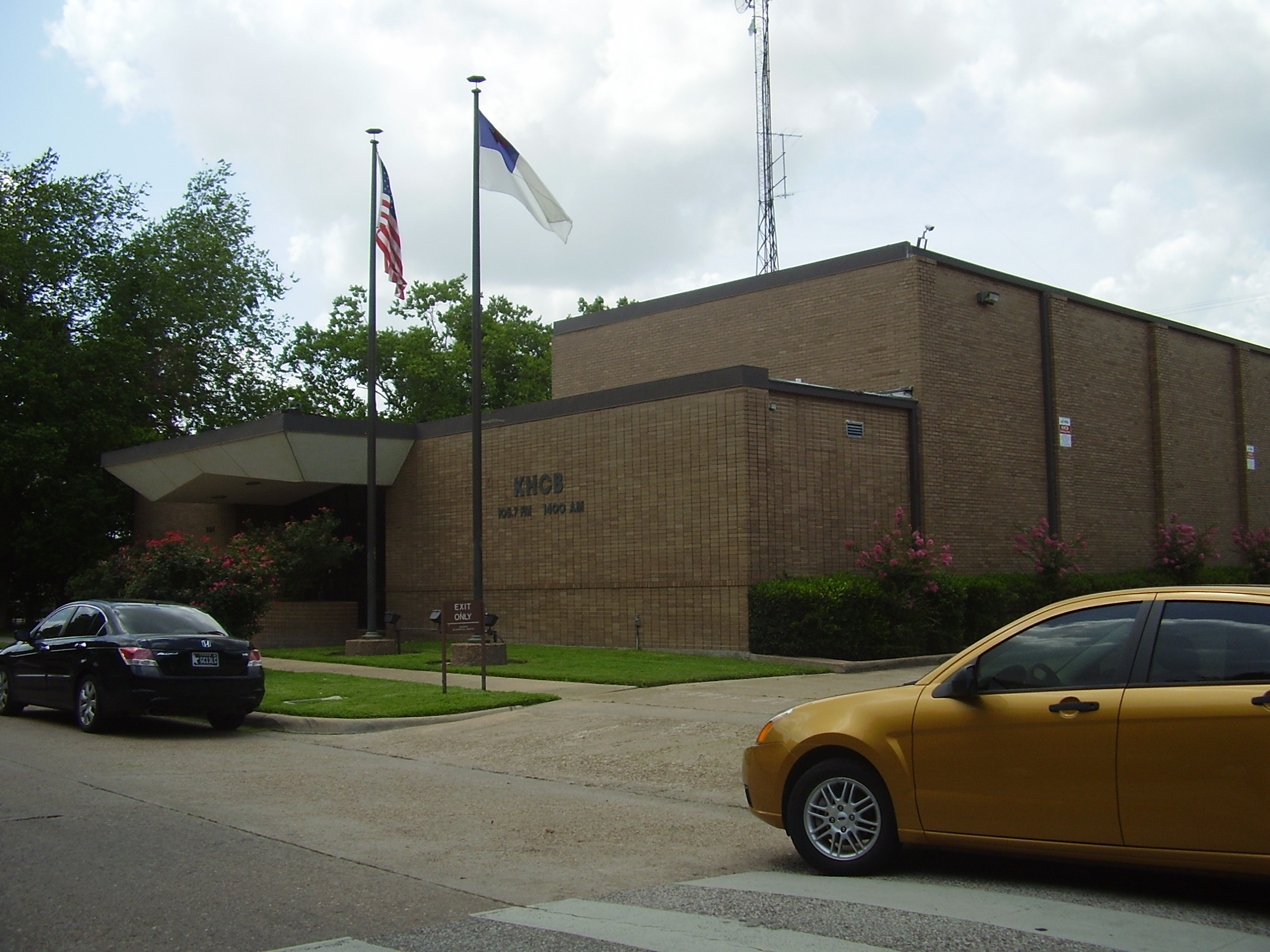
- KHCB and KHCB-FM offices
- League City, Texas; United States
- Broadcast area: Greater Houston
- Frequency: 1400 kHz
- Branding: Red de Radio Amistad

Programming
- Language: Spanish
- Format: Christian

Ownership
- Owner: Houston Christian Broadcasters, Inc.
- Sister stations: KHCB-FM, KHCH

History
- First air date: 1923
- Former call signs: KFLX (1923–1933); KLUF (1933–1957); KILE (1957–1991)
- Call sign meaning: Houston Christian Broadcasters

Technical information
- Licensing authority: FCC
- Facility ID: 27703
- Class: C
- Power: 1,000 watts
- Transmitter coordinates: 29°25′35.0″N 95°8′0.0″W
- Translator: 101.5 K268CW (Houston)

Links
- Public license information: Public file; LMS
- Website: radioamistad.net/web/; khcb.org

KHCB (1400 AM) is a commercial radio station licensed to League City, Texas, United States, and serves Greater Houston. Owned by Houston Christian Broadcasters, Inc., KHCB airs a Spanish-language Christian format, with studios are on South Boulevard in Houston and transmitter sited off of Crews Road in League City. Its programming is also carried by low-power FM translator K268CW at 101.5 MHz.

== History ==
KHCB is believed to be the oldest continuously licensed radio facility in the Houston-Galveston area, as well as the oldest Texas Gulf Coast station.

The station's first license, with its sequentially assigned call sign KFLX, was granted on November 28, 1923, to George R. Clough. The original studios were at 1214 40th Street in Galveston. (Some accounts trace its history to an earlier station, WHAB, which was licensed to Fellman's Department Store on June 29, 1922, and deleted in June 1924.)

On November 11, 1928, as part of a major reallocation enacted by implementation of the Federal Radio Commission's General Order 40, KFLX was assigned to 1370 kHz. In 1933 the call letters were changed to KLUF, after another Galveston station using a similar call sign, KFUL, signed off the air. As a result of the North American Regional Broadcasting Agreement (NARBA) of 1941, KLUF moved to 1400 kHz.

In 1957, after George Roy Clough sold the station, the call letters were changed to KILE, and the station became Galveston Island's legendary "Big 14 KILE" with the adoption of a Top 40 format on September 2, 1957.

In 1991, the station was sold to Houston Christian Broadcasters, which changed the call sign to KHCB and adopted a Spanish Christian format. After nearly 80 years of broadcasting from Galveston Island, the facility was relocated to the mainland, near Texas City, Texas in 2009.

== FM translator ==
In addition to the main station on AM 1400, beginning on August 15, 2016, KHCB is heard on an FM translator on 101.5 MHz.

Broadcast translator for KHCB
Call sign	Frequency	City of license	FID	ERP (W)	Class	Transmitter coordinates	FCC info
K268CW	101.5 FM	Houston, Texas	144563	250	D	29°35′34″N 95°24′44″W	LMS
