= Mid-Missouri =

Central area of the U.S. state of Missouri

Coordinates: 38°45′N 92°15′W

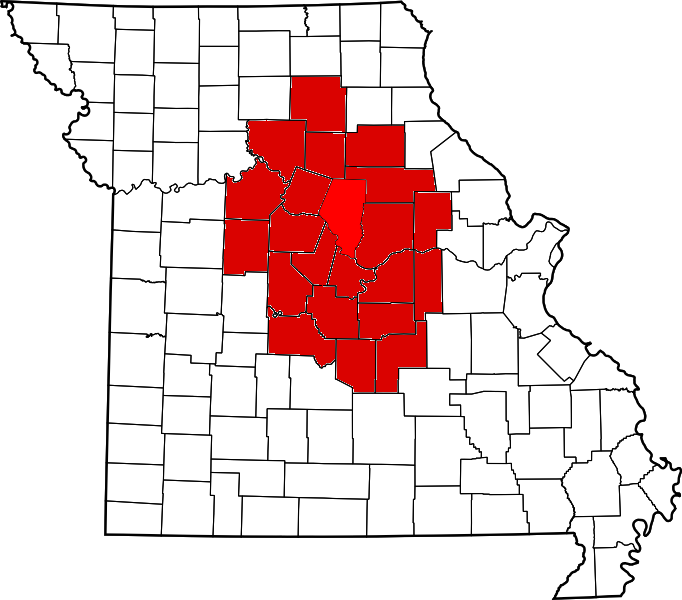

Mid-Missouri is a loosely defined region comprising the central area of the U.S. state of Missouri. The region's largest city is Columbia (population 121,717); the Missouri state capital, Jefferson City, and the University of Missouri are also located here. The region also includes portions of the Lake of the Ozarks, the Ozark Mountains, and the Missouri Rhineland. Mid-Missouri is centered on two contiguous metropolitan areas: the Columbia Metropolitan Area and the Jefferson City Metropolitan Area, which together have a population of over 400,000.

== Definition ==
Counties that are usually considered to be in Mid-Missouri are Audrain, Boone, Callaway, Camden, Chariton, Cole, Cooper, Gasconade, Howard, Macon, Miller, Moniteau, Montgomery, Morgan, Osage, Pettis, Randolph, and Saline. Counties that are sometimes considered to be in the region are Adair, Benton, Laclede, Maries, Phelps, Pulaski, and Warren.

== Municipalities ==
=== Cities over 100,000 ===
- Columbia, Missouri (largest city)

=== Cities over 40,000 ===
- Jefferson City, Missouri (Missouri's capital city)

=== Cities over 20,000 ===
- Sedalia, Missouri
- Rolla, Missouri

=== Cities over 10,000 ===
- Kirksville, Missouri
- Lebanon, Missouri
- Fort Leonard Wood, Missouri
- Moberly, Missouri
- Marshall, Missouri
- Fulton, Missouri
- Mexico, Missouri

=== Cities over 1,000 ===
- Warrenton, Missouri
- Boonville, Missouri
- Wright City, Missouri
- Macon, Missouri
- St. Robert, Missouri
- Waynesville, Missouri
- Ashland, Missouri
- Holts Summit, Missouri
- Osage Beach, Missouri
- Centralia, Missouri
- California, Missouri
- Eldon, Missouri
- Camdenton, Missouri
- St. James, Missouri
- Vandalia, Missouri
- Montgomery City, Missouri
- Tipton, Missouri
- Owensville, Missouri
- Fayette, Missouri
- Versailles, Missouri
- Warsaw, Missouri
- Hermann, Missouri
- Lake Ozark, Missouri
- Slater, Missouri
- Hallsville, Missouri
- Wardsville, Missouri
- Salisbury, Missouri
- Linn, Missouri
- Sweet Springs, Missouri
- Belle, Missouri
- Huntsville, Missouri
- Dixon, Missouri
- La Plata, Missouri
- Wellsville, Missouri
- Lincoln, Missouri
- La Monte, Missouri
- St. Martins, Missouri
- Marthasville, Missouri
- Cole Camp, Missouri
- Taos, Missouri
- Glasgow, Missouri
- Stover, Missouri

== Media ==
=== Television ===
- KMOS (6.1 PBS, 6.2 Create, 6.3 World, 6.4 PBS Kids)
- KOMU (8.1 NBC, 8.3 The CW)
- KRCG (13.1 CBS, 13.2 Comet TV, 13.3 Charge!, 13.4 TBD)
- KMIZ (17.1 ABC, 17.2 Me-TV, 17.3 MyNetworkTV, 17.4 Fox)
- KQFX-LD (22.1 Fox, 22.2 Laff, 22.3 Grit, 22.4 Ion Mystery, 22.5 Dabl)
- KFDR (25.1 CTN, 25.2 CTNi, 25.3 CTN, 25.4 CTN Life)

=== Radio ===
==== FM ====
- KCOU (88.1)
- KHJR (88.1)
- KJLU (88.9)
- KOPN (89.5)
- KMCV (89.9)
- KMUC (90.5)
- KBIA (91.3)
- KMFC (92.1)
- KLOZ (92.7)
- KWJK (93.1)
- KSSZ (93.9)
- KATI (94.3)
- American Family Radio (94.7)
- KWWR (95.7)
- KCMQ (96.7)
- K246CA (97.1)
- KJMO (97.5)
- KPOW-FM (97.7)
- KOTC-LP (98.7)
- KCLR-FM (99.3)
- KBBM (100.1)
- KTGR-FM (100.5)
- K266CA (101.1)
- KPLA (101.5)
- KZWV (101.9)
- KBXR (102.3)
- KZJF (104.1)
- KRES (104.7)
- The Good News Voice (104.9)
- KZZT (105.5)
- KOQL (106.1)
- K293AX (106.5)
- KTXY (106.9)

==== AM ====
- KFAL (900)
- KWOS (950)
- KLIK (1240)
- KXEO (1340)
- KWRT (1370)
- KFRU (1400)
- KTGR (1580)

== Transportation ==
Interstate Highways 70 (concurrent with U.S. 40) and 44 both pass through the region and intersect with each other in St. Louis. Columbia Regional Airport (COU) is the only commercial airport in Mid-Missouri and is served by American Eagle with non-stop service to either Dallas/Fort Worth Chicago-O'Hare or Denver International as well as providing general aviation services.

=== Transit ===
==== Local Transit ====
- Go COMO
- JeffTran
- Kirk-Tran
- Tiger Line

==== Amtrak ====
- Hermann station
- Jefferson City station
- La Plata station
- Sedalia station

=== Highways ===
==== Interstate Highways ====
- Interstate 70
- Interstate 44

==== U.S. Highways ====
- U.S. Route 24
- U.S. Route 36
- U.S. Route 40 (mostly concurrent with I-70)
- U.S. Route 50
- U.S. Route 54
- U.S. Route 63
- U.S. Route 65
