= St. Louis Cardinals Radio Network =

Radio network broadcasting St. Louis Cardinals baseball games

The St. Louis Cardinals Radio Network is a United States radio network that broadcasts St. Louis Cardinals baseball games. The network consists of 146 stations^{1} (including the flagship station) (52 AM, 58 FM) and six FM translators in nine states (four in the Midwest and five in the South). Its flagship station is KMOX in St. Louis. Due to an earlier deal with KTRS, it is still a partial owner of that station although Cardinals games no longer air on KTRS (which they did for the 2006–2010 seasons).

As of the 2022 season, the broadcast team consists of play-by-play announcer John Rooney and color analyst Rick Horton. Mike Claiborne occasionally assists on play-by-play, while Matt Pauley, Joe Pott, and Tom Ackerman host the pre- and post-game shows.

== History ==
The original radio network was established in January 1947, when owner Sam Breadon first extended broadcasts beyond St. Louis. At the time, it reached six stations in two states. As of 2020, the St. Louis Cardinals Radio Network remained the largest of any baseball team, with 111 affiliaties across 8 states.

== Station list ==
=== Flagship (1 station) ===
- KMOX 1120: St. Louis (2011–present; was also the flagship from 1928 to 1940 and again from 1955 to 2005)

=== Affiliates ===
==== Arkansas (13 stations) ====
- KBTA 1340: Batesville
- KAFN 690: Benton
- KAGH 800: Crossett (Daytime only)
- KAGH-FM 104.9: Crossett
- KYEL 105.5: Danville
- KERL 103.9: Earle (Jonesboro area)
- KHGG-FM 103.5: Mansfield (Fort Smith area)
- KVOM 800: Morrilton
- KTLO 1240: Mountain Home
- KDRS 1490: Paragould
- KPOC-FM 104.1: Pocahontas
- KAGE 1580: Van Buren (Fort Smith area)
- KCON 92.7: Vilonia (Conway area)
- KDPX 101.3 Pine Bluff

==== Illinois (30 stations + 8 translators) ====
- WTIM 870: Assumption
- W300EH 107.9: Assumption (rebroadcasts WTIM)
- WJBC 1230: Bloomington
- WBYS 1560: Canton
- WCEZ 93.9: Carthage (Keokuk, Iowa, area)
- WROY 1460: Carmi
- WDAN 1490: Danville
- WSOY 1340: Decatur
- WCRA 1090: Effingham (daytime only)
- W284BI 104.7: Effingham (rebroadcasts WCRA)
- WEBQ-FM 102.3: Eldorado (Harrisburg area)
- WOKZ 105.9: Fairfield
- WGIL 1400: Galesburg
- WEAI 107.1: Jacksonville
- WKEI 1450: Kewanee
- W282AL 104.3: Kewanee (rebroadcasts WKEI)
- WLPO 1220: Lasalle
- WSMI 1540: Litchfield, Illinois (daytime only)
- WREZ 105.5: Metropolis (Paducah, Kentucky area)
- WMIX-FM 94.1: Mount Vernon
- WINI 1420: Murphysboro
- WHQQ 98.9: Neoga (Mattoon-Effingham area)
- WVLN 740: Olney
- WSEI 92.9: Olney
- WSEY 95.7: Oregon (Dixon area)
- W280EG 103.9: Paris (rebroadcasts WLPO)
- WIRL 1290: Peoria (stereo)
- WGEM-FM 105.1: Quincy
- WJEK 95.3: Rantoul (Champaign area; simulcasts with WSJK)
- WTAY 1570: Robinson
- W262BI 100.3: Robinson (rebroadcasts WTAY)
- W298CD 107.5: Shelbyville (rebroadcasts WTIM)
- WHCO 1230: Sparta
- WTAX 1240: Springfield
- W298AP 107.5: Springfield (rebroadcasts WTAX)
- W241CF 96.1: Taylorville (rebroadcasts WTIM)
- WSJK 93.5: Tuscola (Champaign area; simulcasts with WJEK)
- WHET 97.7: West Frankfort (Marion area)

==== Indiana (3 stations) ====
- WQKZ 98.5: Ferdinand
- WQTY 93.3: Linton (Vincennes/Terre Haute area)
- WMVI 106.7: Mt. Vernon

==== Iowa (7 stations) ====
- KJAN 1220: Atlantic (C-QUAM stereo)
- KMA-FM 99.1: Clarinda (Shenendoah area)
- KXNO 1460: Des Moines
- KMAQ-FM 95.1: Maquoketa
- KCOB 1280: Newton
- KCOB-FM 95.9: Newton
- KUDV 106.9 Bloomfield

==== Kentucky (7 stations + 1 translator) ====
- WCBL-FM 99.1: Grand Rivers (Benton area)
- WSON 860: Henderson (C-QUAM stereo)
- WFMW 730: Madisonville
- WYMC 1430: Mayfield
- WNBS 1340: Murray
- W243CU 96.5: Sebree (rebroadcasts WSON)
- WMSK-FM 101.3: Sturgis
- WGKY 95.9: Wickliffe

==== Mississippi (2 stations) ====
- WTUP 1490: Tupelo
- WVBG 1490: Vicksburg

==== Missouri (36 stations) ====
- KAAN-FM 95.5: Bethany
- KDBB 104.3: Bonne Terre (Park Hills area)
- KATI 94.3: California (Jefferson City area)
- KOEA 97.5: Doniphan
- KSSZ 93.9: Fayette (Columbia area)
- KTGR-FM 100.5: Fulton
- KHMO 1070: Hannibal
- KBTC 1250: Houston
- KZYM 1230: Joplin
- KIRX 1450: Kirksville
- KJEL 103.7: Lebanon
- KJFM 102.1: Louisiana
- KIRK 99.9: Macon
- KYRX 97.3: Marble Hill (Cape Girardeau area)
- KMEM-FM 100.5: Memphis
- KXEO 1340: Mexico (C-QUAM stereo)
- KRES 104.7: Moberly
- KKBL 95.9: Monett
- KNEM 1240: Nevada
- KNMO-FM 97.5: Nevada
- KTMO 106.5: New Madrid (Kennett area)
- KBDZ 93.1: Perryville
- KPPL 92.5: Poplar Bluff
- KTTR-FM 99.7: Saint James (Rolla area)
- KESJ 1550: Saint Joseph
- KSMO 1340: Salem
- KSIS 1050: Sedalia
- KBXB 97.9: Sikeston
- KXUS 97.3: Springfield
- KTUI-FM 102.1: Sullivan
- KSAR 92.3: Thayer
- KFBD-FM 97.9: Waynesville
- KWPM 1450: West Plains
- KUKU-FM 100.3: Willow Springs
- KWKJ 98.5: Windsor (Warrensburg area)

==== Oklahoma (5 stations) ====
- KWON 1400: Bartlesville
- KCRC (AM) 1390: Enid
- KREF 1400: Norman (Oklahoma City area)
- WBBZ 1230: Ponca City
- KGFF 1450: Shawnee

==== Tennessee (8 stations) ====
- WMFS-FM 92.9: Bartlett
- WKFN 540: Clarksville
- WTRO 1450: Dyersburg
- WHNY-FM 104.7: Henry (Paris area)
- WZLT 99.3: Lexington
- WMFS 680: Memphis
- WTRB 1570: Ripley
- KYTN 104.9: Union City

=== Former flagships (1 station) ===
- KTRS 550: St. Louis (2006–2010)

=== Former affiliates (2 stations) ===
- KKON 790: Kealakekua, Hawaii
- WTIM-FM 97.3: Taylorville, Illinois

== See also ==
- List of XM Satellite Radio channels
- List of Sirius Satellite Radio stations
- List of St. Louis Cardinals broadcasters
