= KZWV =

Radio station in Eldon, Missouri

- Eldon, Missouri; United States
- Broadcast area: Lake of the Ozarks, Missouri; Jefferson City, Missouri
- Frequency: 101.9 MHz
- Branding: 101.9 The Wave

Programming
- Format: Adult contemporary
- Affiliations: Compass Media Networks; Westwood One

Ownership
- Owner: John and Donald Zimmer; (Zimmer Radio of Mid-Missouri, Inc.)
- Sister stations: KCLR-FM, KTXY, KCMQ, KSSZ, KTGR, KTGR-FM, KFAL, KATI, KWOS

History
- First air date: October 2, 2006
- Call sign meaning: K Z WaVe

Technical information
- Licensing authority: FCC
- Facility ID: 165951
- Class: C2
- ERP: 43,000 watts
- HAAT: 161 meters (528 ft)
- Transmitter coordinates: 38°16′46″N 92°35′07″W

Links
- Public license information: Public file; LMS
- Webcast: Listen Live
- Website: 1019thewave.com

KZWV (101.9 FM "101.9 The Wave") is a radio station airing an adult contemporary format licensed to Eldon, Missouri. The station serves the areas of Osage Beach, Missouri (as well as all the communities surrounding the Lake of the Ozarks) and Jefferson City, Missouri. KZWV's studio is located on Osage Beach Road in Osage Beach, with transmitting facilities just south of Eldon off of U.S. Route 54.

== History ==
KZWV signed on the air on October 2, 2006. The permit was obtained by Randy Wright, the general manager of KMIZ-TV, doing business as Wright Communications, LLLP. 101.9 in Eldon had previously been occupied by KBMX, a soft adult contemporary station that closed in October 2001; its FCC license was revoked as a result of its owner being convicted on child molestation charges. Zimmer acquired KZWV in 2013 for $675,000. In 2014, 2015, and 2016, KZWV was voted "Best Radio Station at the Lake" for the third straight year by the readers of "Lake Lifestyles" magazine.
