= KCMQ =

Radio station in Columbia, Missouri

- Columbia, Missouri; United States
- Broadcast area: Columbia, Jefferson City, Rolla, St. James, Owensville, Lake of the Ozarks, Missouri
- Frequency: 96.7 MHz
- Branding: Classic Rock 96-7 KCMQ

Programming
- Format: Classic rock
- Affiliations: United Stations Radio Networks; Westwood One; Kansas City Chiefs

Ownership
- Owner: Zimmer Radio Group; (Zimmer Radio of Mid-Missouri, Inc)
- Sister stations: KTGR, KTGR-FM, KTXY, KWOS, KZWV, KATI, KCLR-FM, KFAL, KDVC (FM), KSSZ

History
- First air date: 1972 (as KTGC)
- Former call signs: KTGC (1972–1978)
- Call sign meaning: K Columbia MissQuri (Q is a substitute for the O)

Technical information
- Licensing authority: FCC
- Facility ID: 74583
- Class: C1
- ERP: 100,000 watts
- HAAT: 278 meters (912 ft)
- Transmitter coordinates: 38°41′30.00″N 92°5′44.00″W

Links
- Public license information: Public file; LMS
- Webcast: Listen Live
- Website: kcmq.com

KCMQ (96.7 FM) is a radio station broadcasting a classic rock format. Licensed to Columbia, Missouri, the station is currently owned by the Zimmer Radio Group.

KCMQ’s signal is 100 kW, being heard throughout Columbia, Lake of the Ozarks, Jefferson City, Rolla, Owensville, and even Western St. Louis and Eastern Kansas City. It is also heard on 103.1 K276DI (once used for KTGR 1580) in Columbia.

The station previously aired the syndicated morning shows Steve and DC and The Bob & Tom Show. Since 2012, the station has aired a local morning show.

KCMQ carries Kansas City Chiefs football games.

The station has received NAB Marconi Radio Awards in multiple years for best rock radio station in the country.

== Programming schedule ==
The current programming:

- 5 am – 10 am: The Morning Shag with Shags and Trevor
- 10 am – 2 pm: April
- 2 pm – 7 pm: Chris Kennedy
- 7 pm – 12 am: Doug

Weekend syndicated shows include Dee Snider's House Of Hair and Flashback with Matt Pinfield.

== Station format history ==
- 1967–1976: Top 40
- 1976–1978: Country
- 1978–1982: AOR
- 1982–1983: Adult Contemporary
- 1983–1994: Top 40 (CHR)
- 1994–1996: Country
- 1996–1998: Hard rock
- 1998–present: Classic rock
