= KTGR =

- Columbia, Missouri; United States
- Broadcast area: Columbia, Missouri
- Frequency: 1580 kHz
- Branding: KTGR

Programming
- Format: Sports
- Affiliations: ESPN Radio; St. Louis Cardinals Radio Network

Ownership
- Owner: Zimmer Radio of Mid-Missouri, Inc
- Sister stations: KATI, KCLR-FM, KCMQ, KFAL, KSSZ, KTGR-FM, KTXY, KWOS, KZWV

History
- First air date: 1955
- Former call signs: KBIA (1955-1961); KCGM (1961-1966)
- Call sign meaning: K + Mizzou TiGeRs

Technical information
- Licensing authority: FCC
- Facility ID: 74584
- Class: D
- Power: 214 watts day 8 watts night
- Transmitter coordinates: 38°57′45.00″N 92°18′14.00″W
- Translator: 105.1 K286CL (Columbia)
- Repeater: 100.5 KTGR-FM (Fulton)

Links
- Public license information: Public file; LMS
- Webcast: Listen Live
- Website: ktgr.com

KTGR (1580 AM) is a radio station broadcasting a sports format, with programming from the ESPN Radio network. Licensed to Columbia, Missouri, United States, the station serves the Columbia, Missouri, area. The station is currently owned by Zimmer Radio Group of Mid-Missouri.

== History ==
The station was assigned the call letters KBIA by the FCC on October 7, 1954, and began broadcasting in April 1955. Owner Cecil W. Roberts was a former newspaper publisher from Farmington, Mo., who eventually built a chain of a dozen radio stations in six states, all jointly owned by Roberts and his wife, Jane A. Roberts. KBIA became the third radio station in Columbia, joining KFRU (1925) and KOWS 1240 (1937).

As an affiliate of the Missouri Sports Network, KBIA carried University of Missouri football games in 1960.

The station was sold in April 1961 to Barrington Broadcasting Co. for $90,000 (principals were Aubrey D. Reid and his wife, who owned WEW-AM in St. Louis, Mo., and WKYB-AM and WKYB-FM in Paducah, Ky.) In June 1961, the call letters were changed to KCGM.

In November 1966, a subsequent owner, Tiger Broadcasting Co., changed the call letters to KTGR.

The station in its early days ran a Top 40 music format until 1978, when both KTGR and KCMQ swapped formats.

== Translators ==
In addition to the main station, KTGR is relayed by an additional translator to widen its broadcast area.

Broadcast translator for KTGR
| Call sign | Frequency | City of license | FID | ERP (W) | Class | FCC info |
|---|---|---|---|---|---|---|
| K286CL | 105.1 FM | Columbia, Missouri | 140770 | 250 | D | LMS |
