= KCLR-FM =

Radio station in Boonville–Columbia, Missouri

- Boonville, Missouri; United States
- Broadcast area: Columbia, Missouri
- Frequency: 99.3 MHz
- Branding: Clear 99

Programming
- Format: Country music
- Affiliations: Premiere Networks

Ownership
- Owner: Zimmer Radio of Mid-Missouri, Inc.
- Sister stations: KTGR, KTGR-FM, KTXY, KWOS, KZWV, KATI, KCMQ, KFAL, KDVC (FM), KSSZ

History
- Former call signs: KWRT-FM (1974–1977); KDBX (1977–1990)
- Call sign meaning: "Clear"

Technical information
- Licensing authority: FCC
- Facility ID: 6014
- Class: C2
- ERP: 33,000 watts
- HAAT: 180.0 meters
- Transmitter coordinates: 38°46′34″N 92°32′45″W

Links
- Public license information: Public file; LMS
- Webcast: Listen live
- Website: clear99.com

KCLR-FM (99.3 MHz), branded as Clear 99, is a radio station broadcasting a country music format. Licensed to Boonville, Missouri, the station serves the Columbia, Missouri, area. The station is owned by the Zimmer Radio Group of Mid-Missouri. Clear 99 has consistently ranked a strong number-one in the ratings for many years.
