= KTXY =

Coordinates: 38.638°N 92.493°W

Jefferson City, Missouri; United States
- Broadcast area: Mid-Missouri
- Frequency: 106.9 MHz
- Branding: Y-107

Programming
- Format: Mainstream Top 40
- Affiliations: Premiere Networks; KMIZ (weather)

Ownership
- Owner: Zimmer Radio; (Zimmer Radio of Mid-Missouri, Inc.)
- Sister stations: KATI, KCLR-FM, KCMQ, KFAL, KTGR-FM, KSSZ, KTGR, KWOS

History
- First air date: December 1, 1969
- Former call signs: KJFF (1969–1981); KTXY (1981–1992); KKFA (1992–1993)
- Call sign meaning: The "Y" in KTXY is used in the "Y107" branding

Technical information
- Facility ID: 9929
- Class: C
- ERP: 96,000 watts
- HAAT: 381 meters (1,250 ft)

Links
- Webcast: Listen live
- Website: y107.com

KTXY (106.9 FM), branded as "Y107", is a Top 40 Mainstream radio station licensed to Jefferson City, Missouri, that serves central Missouri including Columbia. It is owned by the Zimmer Radio Group, and broadcasts with an Effective Radiated Power (ERP) of 96 kilowatts. Its transmitter is located approximately 20 miles (32 km) west of Jefferson City in McGirk.

== History ==
The station was issued a construction permit on April 29, 1969, and became fully licensed as KJFF on December 1, 1969. It first aired a beautiful music format. On October 28, 1981 under new ownership of Brill Media, it changed its call sign to KTXY and became an adult contemporary format.

In 1982, it would switch the format to Top 40/CHR as "Music 107", marking it one of two dominant CHR stations in the mid-Missouri area at the period, with the other being KCMQ. Its current name "Y107" was introduced in 1988. On October 5, 1992, its call letters were changed to KKFA, with a soft rock format called "The Cafe" for a short period before returning to the KTXY call letters. On October 11, 1993, the station returned to a Top 40 format as Y-107. After competitor KCMQ dropped its CHR format in 1994, KTXY became the only dominant CHR station for the mid-Missouri region. Since 2001, its main competitor is similarly formatted KOQL.
