= KSSZ =

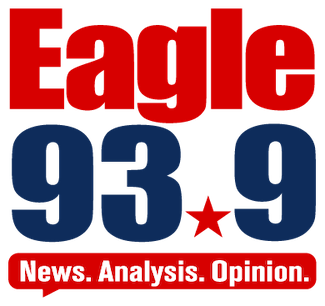
- Fayette, Missouri; United States
- Broadcast area: Columbia–Mid-Missouri
- Frequency: 93.9 MHz
- Branding: 93.9 The Eagle

Programming
- Format: Talk radio
- Affiliations: Fox News Radio; Compass Media Networks; Premiere Networks; Westwood One

Ownership
- Owner: Zimmer Radio; (Zimmer Radio of Mid-Missouri, Inc.)
- Sister stations: KATI, KCLR-FM, KCMQ, KFAL, KTGR, KTGR-FM, KTXY, KWOS, KZWV

History
- First air date: July 15, 1994; 31 years ago
- Former call signs: KACJ (1993–1994); KTLH (1994–1996); KLSC (1996–1999)

Technical information
- Licensing authority: FCC
- Facility ID: 5227
- Class: C3
- ERP: 25,000 watts
- HAAT: 100 meters (330 ft)
- Transmitter coordinates: 39°3′28.00″N 92°28′49.00″W
- Translator: 96.3 K242CT (Columbia)

Links
- Public license information: Public file; LMS
- Webcast: Listen live
- Website: 939theeagle.com

KSSZ (93.9 MHz) is a commercial FM radio station licensed to Fayette, Missouri, and serving Columbia and Mid-Missouri. The station is owned by the Zimmer Radio Group of Mid-Missouri with studios on Lemone Industrial Boulevard in Columbia, off U.S. Route 63.

KSSZ is a Class C3 FM station. It has an effective radiated power (ERP) of 25,000 watts, and its transmitter tower is off North Boone Lane near Wilhite Road in Rocheport. Programming is also heard on 250-watt FM translator K242CT on 96.3 MHz in Columbia.

== History ==
The station signed on the air on July 15, 1994. Its call sign was originally KACJ and it was licensed to Boonville, Missouri. KACJ featured a soft adult contemporary format as "Lite FM 93.9". It later used the monikers "Lite 93.9" and "93.9 K-Lite" while still airing the same soft AC format.

Big Country of Missouri initially owned the station. Zimmer Radio bought KACJ in September 1996.

Around 1996, the station changed its city of license to Fayette and upgraded from 6,000 watts to 25,000 watts. That gave it a signal that could be heard in the larger Columbia radio market. That year, the station adopted a classic rock format with the call letters KLSC. Classic rock was initially successful, but a 1998 realignment of Zimmer Radio's Mid-Missouri stations sent much of the classic rock programming to co-owned KCMQ.

The frequency returned to an adult contemporary format in 1998. This time it called itself "Mix 93.9", still with the KLSC call letters. In December 1999, the station became "Kiss 93.9" and featured an oldies-leaning soft AC format, adopting the KSSZ call letters. "Kiss 93.9" failed to gain traction in the market. It was mostly automated, using personalities who voicetracked their shows from Seattle.

In the weeks following the attacks on September 11, 2001, the station broadcast an all-news format, largely featuring the audio from Fox News Channel. In October of that year, "Kiss 93.9" and its AC format briefly returned on 93.9 FM. In the fall of 2001, the station became "The Eagle 93-9", with a talk radio format. After a local morning show, it carries syndicated conservative talk programs with updates from Fox News Radio. This has become the longest-lasting format in the frequency's history.

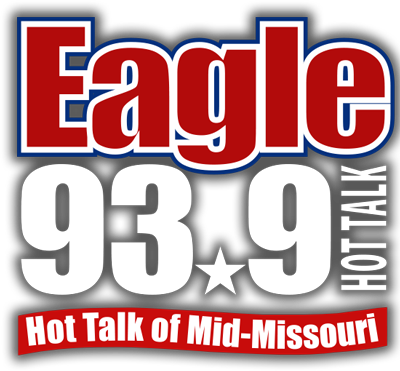
Logo under previous slogan
