= KFAL =

- Fulton, Missouri; United States
- Broadcast area: Columbia/Jefferson City, Missouri
- Frequency: 900 kHz
- Branding: The Big 900

Programming
- Format: Classic country
- Affiliations: ABC News Radio

Ownership
- Owner: Zimmer Radio of Mid-Missouri, Inc
- Sister stations: KATI, KCLR-FM, KCMQ, KSSZ, KTGR, KTGR-FM, KTXY, KWOS, KZWV

Technical information
- Licensing authority: FCC
- Facility ID: 34409
- Class: D
- Power: 1,000 watts day 135 watts night
- Transmitter coordinates: 38°51′58.00″N 91°57′15.00″W
- Translator: 95.3 K237GU (Columbia)

Links
- Public license information: Public file; LMS
- Webcast: Listen Live
- Website: thebig900kfal.com

KFAL (900 AM) is a radio station broadcasting a classic country format. It is licensed to Fulton, Missouri, and serves the Columbia, Missouri area. The station is owned by the Zimmer Radio Group of Mid-Missouri and features programming from ABC News Radio. It also broadcasts on translator 95.3 K237GU.
