= KHGG =

KHGG may refer to:

- KHGG-FM, a radio station (103.5 FM) licensed to Mansfield, Arkansas, United States
- KAGE (AM), a radio station (1580 AM) licensed to Van Buren, Arkansas, which held the call sign KHGG from 2001 to 2021
