= Capital Mall (Missouri) =

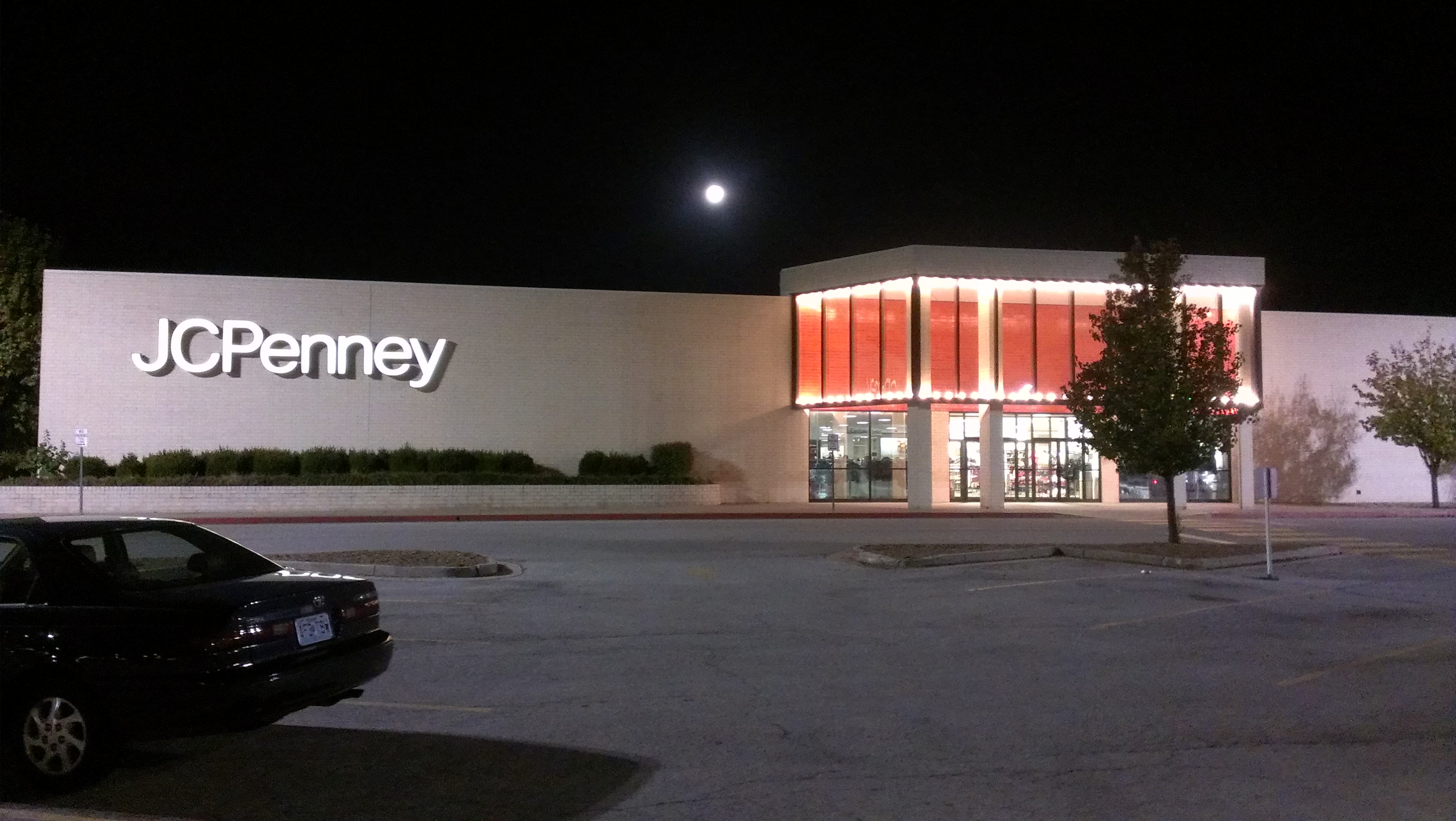
- Moonlit JCPenney storefront at Capital Mall
- Location: Jefferson City, Missouri, United States
- Coordinates: 38.585713°N 92.253639°W
- Address: 3600 Country Club Drive
- Opened: 1978
- Developer: General Growth Properties
- Manager: Covington Realty Partners
- Owner: Farmer Holding Company
- Num. of stores: 65
- Num. of anchor tenants: 2
- Floor area: 560,000 sq ft (52,000 m^{2})
- Floors: 1
- Parking: 3102
- Public transit: JeffTran
- Website: www.capitalmall.com

Capital Mall is a shopping mall located in Jefferson City, Missouri, United States that opened in 1978. Its anchors are JCPenney and Dillard's. Wipro operates an information technology consulting business in the former Sears anchor

In 2013, the mall's owner, Farmer Holding Company, applied to Jefferson City for approval to build a 127-room hotel and 61,000 square feet (5,700 m^{2}) conference center at Capital Mall. Each would cost approximately $14 million. It was never built.
