= Fear Fest =

Halloween attraction in Missouri, U.S.

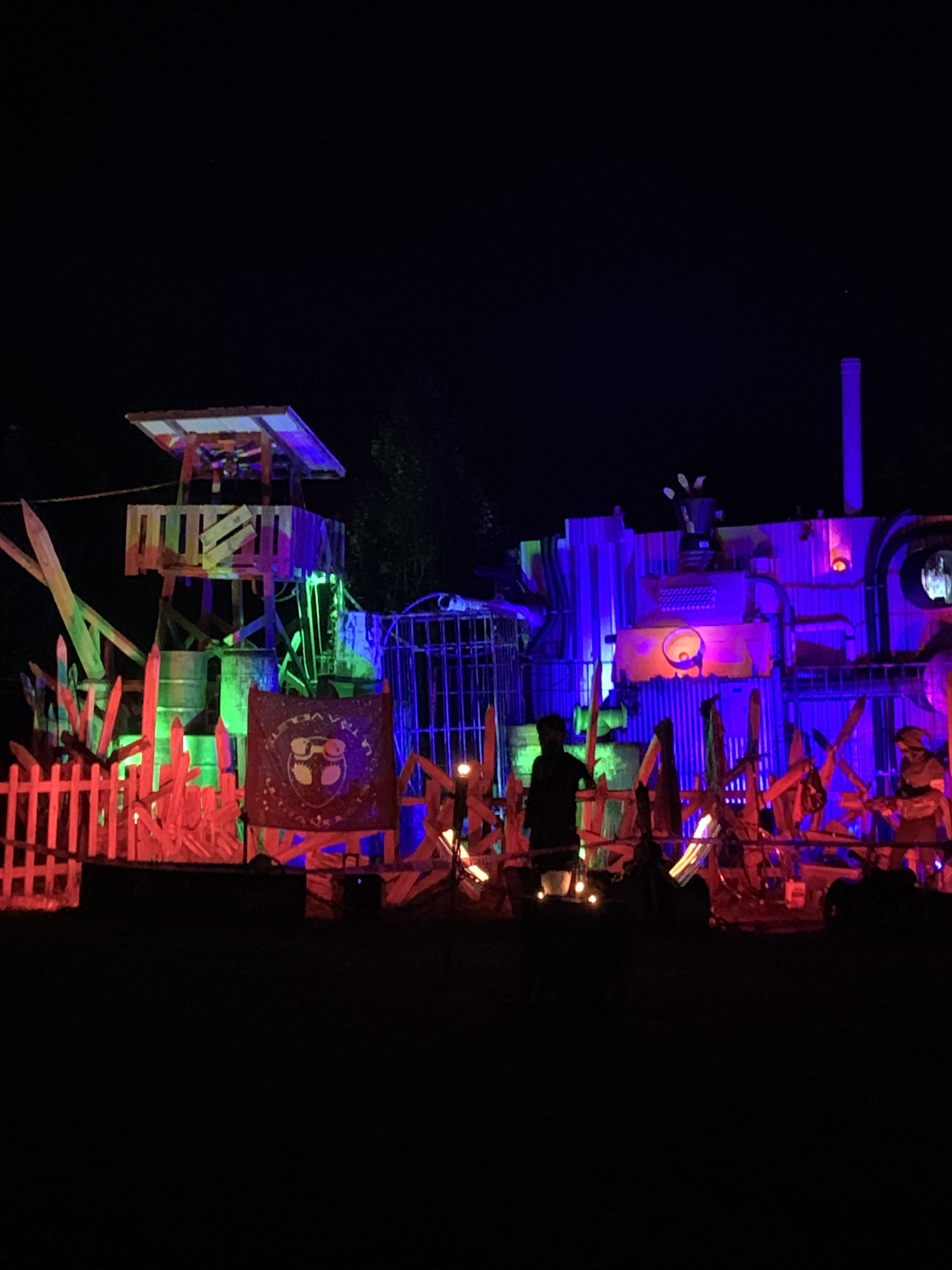
- Location: Columbia, Missouri
- Owner: Bill Schnell
- Website: www.necroplanet.com/index.shtml

FearFest is a haunted house attraction located in Columbia, Missouri. According to Haunted World, it is the largest haunted attraction in Mid-Missouri.

It is currently owned by Bill Schnell. As of 2021, the location is celebrating its 19th anniversary.

The location currently has four attractions, the Hawthorne State Asylum, The Mortuary, Necropolis Haunted House, and Terror in the Woods.
