= Columbia Regional Airport =

Airport in Missouri, United States of America

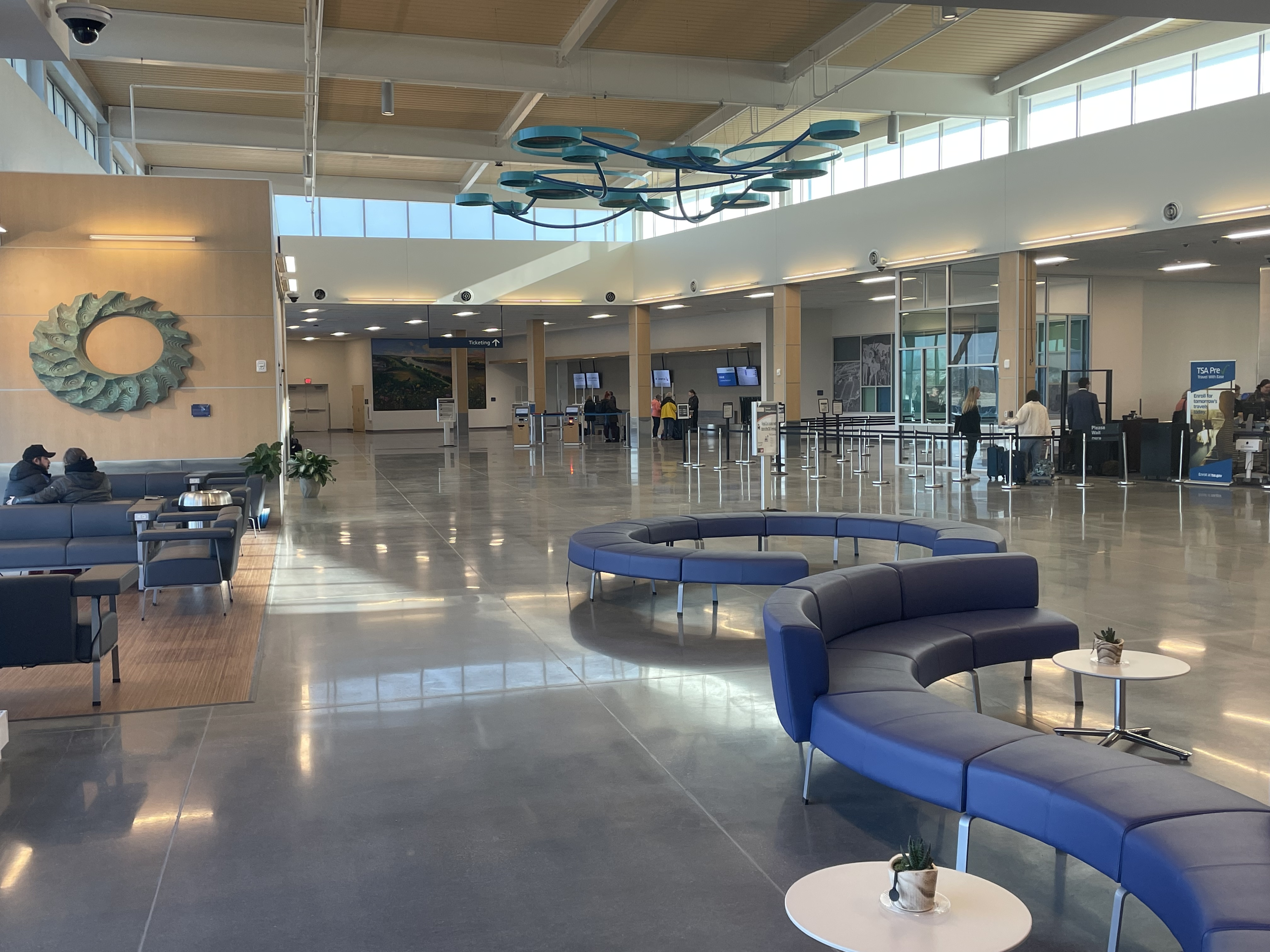
- IATA: COU; ICAO: KCOU; FAA LID: COU

Summary
- Airport type: Public
- Owner: City of Columbia
- Serves: Mid Missouri (Columbia / Jefferson City)
- Location: Boone County, Missouri, U.S.
- Built: 2022
- Elevation AMSL: 889 ft (271 m)
- Coordinates: 38°49′05″N 092°13′11″W
- Website: www.flycou.com

Maps
- FAA airport diagram

- Location within Missouri Location within the United States

Runways
Direction	Length		Surface
Direction	ft	m	Surface
2/20	7,401	2,256	Concrete
13/31	5,500	1,676	Asphalt

Statistics
- Departing passengers (12 months ending December 2022): 79,900
- Passenger volume (12 months ending December 2022): 160,790
- Aircraft operations (year ending October 31, 2022): 24,063
- Based aircraft (2022): 32
- Source: Federal Aviation Administration

Columbia Regional Airport (IATA: COU, ICAO: KCOU) is a commercial passenger airport serving Columbia, Missouri. Located about 12 miles (19 km) southeast of Columbia in Boone County, Missouri, it is the only commercial airport in Mid-Missouri and also serves the state capital of Jefferson City. Commercial passenger service is provided by American Airlines subsidiary American Eagle and United Airlines via its regional airline contractor SkyWest branded as United Express. The airport opened in 1968 (58 years ago), replacing the Columbia Municipal Airport off of Interstate 70. It is frequently used for charter flights by college athletic teams visiting the University of Missouri and for MU team flights.

In 2019, airport officials extended the 6,500-foot runway to 7,400 feet and added a new 5,400 foot crosswind runway. On October 26, 2022, the airport opened the airport's 56,000 ft^{2} terminal with three jetways.

Columbia Regional is included in the Federal Aviation Administration (FAA) National Plan of Integrated Airport Systems for 2021–2025, in which it is categorized as a non-hub primary commercial service facility. Federal Aviation Administration records say the airport had 12,719 passenger boardings (enplanements) in calendar year 2008, 26,842 in 2009 and 38,293 in 2010.

== History ==
=== 1920s - 1980s ===
In 1928, the Columbia Municipal Airport was founded and located on US Highway 40 at the western edge of Columbia. The site today is part of Cosmo Recreation Center managed by Columbia Parks and Recreation and the roadway is known as Business Loop 70 West. The land was leased from the Allton Brothers, who had previously operated a flying service there. Part of the current Candlelight lodge on the north side of Business Loop 70 was then known as the Allton Hotel. For a brief time, the Allton Hotel was used by Stephens College as classrooms to teach aeronautics to Stephens College women. Improvements were made with Civil Aeronautics Administration assistance so that the airport would serve as an emergency landing field for the airway between Kansas City and St. Louis. In 1960, the Columbia Airport consisted of 470 acres purchased at a cost of $154,000 of which only $8,723.47 was contributed by the Federal Aviation Agency.

In 1962, the National Airport Plan recommended that Columbia have a 5,300-foot runway to accommodate the Convair CV340 at Columbia Municipal Airport and to determine whether it was practical to develop the existing site and provide for reasonable expansion capabilities. The estimated cost for the improvement would cost $3,000,000 for clearing, grading, runway extension, taxiway, apron, acquisition of south instrument approach zone and terminal building.

A prominent feature of the Columbia Airport study was the conclusion that a need existed for a Mid-Missouri Regional Air Terminal serving both Columbia and Jefferson City. News releases by the Federal Aviation Agency and trade publications indicated that consolidation of subsidized service to cities as close as Columbia and Jefferson City may be required in the future as a condition of the subsidy. The airport would be the regional airport for several Mid-Missouri cities including Jefferson City, Fulton, Mexico, and Boonville. Another advantage in building a regional airport is that the new airport could be under construction and completed without disturbing the air traffic at the existing Columbia Municipal Airport.

Twenty-three sites were examined upon which an airfield might be established, and the search was narrowed to five: Highway K, Fulton Road, Highway M, Highway DD and Highway H. On October 23, 1963, Horner and Shifrin Consulting Engineers of St. Louis submitted a report to the City of Columbia. They recommended the Highway H (also known as the Elkhurst) site. The estimated cost of the entire development was $3,410,000, of which it was expected that $1,515,000 would be a grant under the Federal Aid Airport Program administered by the Federal Aviation Agency.

The Columbia City Council called for a bond election, which was approved in January 1964. In May 1966, the Federal Aviation Agency approved a federal grant to pay part of the cost of buying the airport site. A grant of $131,586 was the first of several allocations from the federal government to help pay for the new $3.5 million facility. In November 1966, the city had obtained 183 acres for the airport site. By August 11, 1967, ground was broken, officially beginning construction on Columbia Regional Airport. The main 6500-foot runway had its dedication November 2, 1968, and the new Columbia Regional Airport opened in December 1968. The airport bond was paid off in the spring of 1986.

=== 2000s - Present ===
Until 2001, Trans World Express (Trans States Airlines) Jetstream 41s flew to St. Louis. After Trans World merged with American, American Connection (Trans States Airlines) took over operations and continued flying Jetstream 41s to St. Louis until 2006. US Airways Express (Air Midwest) Beechcraft 1900s replaced American Connection. Air Midwest began flying to Kansas City and St. Louis. Service to St. Louis was later dropped in favor of additional flights to Kansas City.

In 2008, Northwest Airlink (Mesaba Airlines) replaced US Airways Express, flying Saab 340s to Memphis. Later that year, Northwest Airlines merged with Delta Air Lines. In 2010 Delta Connection switched service from Mesaba Airlines to Pinnacle Airlines and began operating CRJ-200s. As part of this update, Delta Connection stopped accepting Essential Air Service subsidies. In June 2012, ExpressJet Airlines replaced Pinnacle Airlines as the Delta Connection carrier at Columbia and service to Atlanta began; in October 2012, service to Memphis was dropped. ExpressJet CRJ-200s flew to Atlanta and Memphis. Delta ceased operations out of Columbia Regional Airport on February 13, 2013.

In August 2012, Frontier Airlines announced plans for twice weekly flights from Columbia to Orlando. In November 2012, Frontier started twice weekly flights to Orlando using Airbus A319 aircraft. Frontier ended service to Orlando on May 13, 2013.

On October 22, 2012, it was announced by then-Columbia mayor Bob McDavid that American Airlines and the City of Columbia reached an agreement that was approved by the Columbia City Council for air service from Columbia to Chicago–O'Hare and Dallas/Fort Worth and service to those two cities began in February 2013.

The 2013 Federal sequester resulted in a planned closure of the airport's contract control tower. The plan was postponed and later canceled.

On February 27, 2017, Columbia and United Airlines officials announced that starting August 1, 2017, there would be one daily flight to Denver and two daily flights to Chicago–O'Hare. The new service lines added an additional 150 seats per day for a total 417 seats per day from Columbia. In April 2019, United Airlines added an additional flight to and from Chicago O'Hare for a total of 3 flights each direction. American Airlines followed suit adding two additional flights to Chicago-O'Hare for a total of 4 in each direction. In total, COU now has seven flights a day to and from Chicago-O'Hare (ORD), three a day to and from Dallas-Fort Worth (DFW), and one a day to and from Denver (DEN). All are operated on 50-76 seat regional jets.

On April 18, 2019, at a coffee round-table discussing the new terminal master plan, future destinations, and parking at the airport, it was revealed the airport hopes to add an additional 200 parking spots as well as have a design for the new terminal by the end of the year. Passengers expressed interest in adding Atlanta, Charlotte, and Las Vegas to the airport's growing list of destinations. As for the new terminal, preliminary sketches uploaded to the airport's website call for adding two more gates (for a total of four) with jet bridges built just to the south of the existing terminal. The new terminal began construction in November 2020 with the terminal grand opening and ribbon cutting ceremony on October 19, 2022.

The terminal opened on October 26, 2022, with additional room for future expansions, a larger security checkpoint with room to add more lanes, larger restrooms including gender neutral/family restrooms, mothers' rooms for nursing, a sensory room, an animal relief area, room for concessionaires, and 4 new gates (including jet bridges) with charging stations. The airport offers free parking for departing passengers for up to 30 days; longer-term parking is subject to availability and requires prior approval.

Following the opening of the new terminal, the airport has seen rapid growth in passenger numbers. United returned in mid-2025 restoring a flight to Denver as well as a choice of carriers serving Chicago-O'Hare, while American added a daily nonstop to Charlotte in June 2026, which came alongside Allegiant Air entering as the airport's third carrier with service to popular holiday destinations in Florida. A new, 700-space paved secondary parking lot with shuttle service to the terminal opened in June 2026, easing pressure on the main lot where before some cars had to park on grassy areas due to lack of space. At the same time the city voted to transfer control of the airport from a single manager to a new, separate department, while also announcing upcoming projects such as a kitchen serving the terminal and baggage handling enhancements.

== Facilities ==
The airport covers 1,538 acres (622 ha) at an elevation of 889 feet (271 m). It has two runways: 2/20 is 7,401 by 150 feet (2,256 x 46 m) concrete; 13/31 is 5,500 by 100 feet (1,341 x 23 m) asphalt.

For the 12-month period ending October 31, 2022, the airport had 24,063 aircraft operations, average 66 per day: 79% general aviation, 12% air taxi, 8% airline, and 1% military. In October 2022, there were 32 aircraft based at this airport: 18 single-engine, 3 multi-engine, 9 jet, and 2 helicopter.

In calendar year 2017, the airport had 88,650 enplanements, a 36.36% increase from 65,014 in 2016 and ranked as #243 out of 555 on the list of FAA airports with the most enplanements.

== Airlines and destinations ==
=== Passenger ===
Airlines	Destinations
Allegiant Air	Destin/Fort Walton Beach, Orlando/Sanford, St. Petersburg/Clearwater
American Eagle	Charlotte, Chicago–O'Hare, Dallas/Fort Worth
United Express	Chicago–O'Hare, Denver

== Statistics ==
=== Carrier shares ===
Carrier shares (September 2025 – August 2026)
Carrier	Passengers (arriving and departing)
Envoy Air	236,000(65.82%)
SkyWest	103,000(28.81%)
Allegiant Air	13,850(3.87%)
GoJet	5,380(1.50%)

=== Top destinations ===
Busiest domestic routes out of COU (September 2025 – August 2026)
Rank	City	Passengers	Carriers
1	Chicago, Illinois (O’Hare)	82,210	American, United
2	Dallas/Fort Worth, Texas	63,850	American
3	Denver, Colorado	19,700	United
4	Charlotte, North Carolina	6,550	American
5	Destin/Ft. Walton Beach, Florida	3,750	Allegiant
6	Orlando–Sanford, Florida	3,290	Allegiant

== Accidents and incidents ==
- On January 30, 1990, a Hawker Siddeley HS-125 operated by Slender You Ltd. diverted and crashed about 2 miles east of Columbia Regional Airport because of fuel starvation, low levels of deice fluid and ice blockage of the fuel filters. One crew member died out of 3 occupants on board.
- On January 11, 2019, American Eagle Flight 5766, en route from Dallas-Fort Worth, slid off the runway after landing in icy and snowy conditions. The Bombardier CRJ-900, operated by Mesa Airlines, was the first flight to attempt to land at the airport after the ground crew cleared the runway of ice and snow. Reports state the runway was still very slick with ice.

== See also ==
- List of airports in Missouri

== Other sources ==
- Essential Air Service documents (Docket OST-2006-23931) from the U.S. Department of Transportation:
  - Notice (February 9, 2006): of Trans States Airlines, Inc. d/b/a American Connection submitting notice of its intent to terminate service to Columbia, Missouri, on or after May 9, 2006.
  - Order 2006-4-6 (April 11, 2006): prohibiting Trans States Airlines, Inc., d/b/a American Connection, from suspending its service at Columbia/Jefferson City, Missouri, at the end of its 90-day notice period, and requesting proposals, with or without subsidy requests, from carriers interested in providing replacement service.
  - Order 2006-6-21 (June 26, 2006): selecting Air Midwest, Inc. d/b/a US Airways Express, to provide essential air service at Columbia/Jefferson City, Missouri, for a two-year period at a subsidy of $598,751 annually.
  - Notice (January 21, 2008): Air Midwest, Inc. serving notice of its intent to discontinue scheduled subsidized Essential Air Service between Columbia/Jefferson City, Missouri and both Kansas City, Missouri and St. Louis, Missouri effective April 20, 2008.
  - Order 2008-2-2 (February 6, 2008): prohibiting Air Midwest from terminating its subsidized service at nine communities (Grand Island, NE; McCook, NE; El Dorado/Camden, AR; Harrison, AR; Hot Springs, AR; Jonesboro, AR; Columbia/Jefferson City, MO; Joplin, MO; Kirksville, MO) for 30 days beyond the end of its 90-day notice period, and requesting long term proposals from carriers interested in providing essential air service at any or all of the communities, with or without subsidy, by February 29.
  - Order 2008-5-2 (May 5, 2008): selects Mesaba Aviation, Inc. d/b/a Northwest Airlink to provide essential air service at Columbia/Jefferson City, Missouri, beginning when the carrier inaugurates service through the 24th month thereafter. Scheduled Service: 20 nonstop round trips to Memphis each week. Aircraft type: Saab 340 (34 passenger seats). Annual compensation: $2,186,590.
  - Order 2010-3-35 (March 31, 2010): relying on Delta Air Lines to provide subsidy-free essential air service (EAS) at Columbia/Jefferson City, Missouri, and terminating the carrier-selection case effective September 1, 2010, when the currently effective EAS contract at the community expires.
