= KBMX (Missouri) =

Radio station in Eldon, Missouri, United States (1988–2001)

- Eldon, Missouri; United States
- Frequency: 101.9 MHz

Ownership
- Owner: Lake Broadcasting, Inc.

History
- First air date: October 1, 1988
- Last air date: October 4, 2001
- Former call signs: KKNO (CP, 1987–1988)

Technical information
- Facility ID: 36262
- Class: A
- ERP: 2,250 watts
- HAAT: 166 meters
- Transmitter coordinates: 38°16.769′N 092°35.111′W

KBMX was a radio station on 101.9 FM in Eldon, Missouri, United States, which broadcast between 1988 and 2001.

KBMX went off the air when its licensee, Lake Broadcasting, Inc., had all of its licenses cancelled in response to a Federal Communications Commission investigation. The frequency was reactivated October 2, 2006 by a new and unrelated station, KZWV.

== History ==
KBMX signed on October 1, 1988. The station carried a soft adult contemporary format through its entire history.

The president of Contemporary Media was Michael S. Rice. In 1994, Rice was convicted of sexually abusing five teenagers in Missouri. The next year, the Federal Communications Commission opened a hearing to revoke the licenses of all of the stations owned by Contemporary Media and its sister companies, Contemporary Broadcasting and Lake Broadcasting. Together, the companies also owned KFMZ in Columbia, as well as two additional unbuilt stations in the state and a cluster of three stations in Terre Haute, Indiana.

In 1997, an FCC administrative law judge ruled that the licenses should be revoked. The FCC affirmed the decision in March 1998. Rice appealed, losing in federal appeals court. In March 2001, the Supreme Court refused to hear the case. All Contemporary stations ceased operations by FCC order on October 4, 2001, including KBMX, which closed with an unbuilt construction permit to increase its power to 47,500 watts.
