= KFMZ (Columbia, Missouri) =

Radio station in Columbia, Missouri, United States (1971–2001)

- Columbia, Missouri; United States
- Frequency: 98.3 MHz

Ownership
- Owner: Contemporary Media, Inc.

History
- First air date: October 12, 1971
- Last air date: October 4, 2001

Technical information
- Facility ID: 13732
- ERP: 23,500 watts
- HAAT: 217 meters (712 ft)
- Transmitter coordinates: 38°47′27.6″N 92°17′42″W

KFMZ was a radio station on 98.3 FM in Columbia, Missouri, United States, which broadcast between 1971 and 2001.

KFMZ went off the air when its licensee, Contemporary Media, Inc., had all of its licenses cancelled in response to a Federal Communications Commission investigation. The 98.3 frequency remained vacant for 15 years until KDVC signed on in November 2016.

== History ==
KFMZ signed on October 12, 1971. The station carried an album oriented rock (AOR) format. In 1974, a fire in downtown Columbia tore through a block of businesses; KFMZ's studios were affected by smoke damage, and employees moved equipment out by hand.

KFMZ hat from the late '80s - early '90s

The president of Contemporary Media was Michael S. Rice. In 1994, Rice was convicted of sexually abusing five teenagers in Missouri. The next year, the Federal Communications Commission opened a hearing to revoke the licenses of all of the stations owned by Contemporary Media and its sister companies, Contemporary Broadcasting and Lake Broadcasting. Together, the companies also owned Eldon's KBMX, as well as two additional unbuilt stations in the state and a cluster of three stations in Terre Haute, Indiana.

In 1997, an FCC administrative law judge ruled that the licenses should be revoked. The FCC affirmed the decision in March 1998. Rice appealed, losing in federal appeals court. In March 2001, the Supreme Court refused to hear the case. All Contemporary stations ceased operations by FCC order on October 4, 2001, including KFMZ, in its final years a modern rock station known as "The Buzz".
