= KWWR =

Radio station in Mexico, Missouri

- Mexico, Missouri; United States
- Broadcast area: Columbia, Missouri
- Frequency: 95.7 MHz
- Branding: Mix Country 96 KWWR

Programming
- Format: Country music
- Affiliations: Compass Media Networks

Ownership
- Owner: KXEO Radio
- Sister stations: KXEO

History
- First air date: 1978

Technical information
- Licensing authority: FCC
- Facility ID: 35952
- Class: C
- ERP: 100,000 watts
- HAAT: 360 meters (1,180 ft)
- Transmitter coordinates: 39°15′49″N 92°8′6″W

Links
- Public license information: Public file; LMS
- Webcast: Listen Live
- Website: kwwr.com

KWWR (95.7 FM), branded as Mix Country 96, is a radio station broadcasting a country music format. It is licensed to Mexico, Missouri, United States, and serves the Columbia, Missouri area and reaches most of the northeast Missouri region. The station is owned by Kxeo Radio.
