= KNMO-FM =

- Nevada, Missouri; United States
- Frequency: 97.5 MHz
- Branding: Double K Country

Programming
- Format: Country
- Affiliations: ABC News Radio

Ownership
- Owner: Harbit Communications, Inc.
- Sister stations: KNEM

History
- First air date: September 10, 1984
- Call sign meaning: Nevada, Missouri

Technical information
- Licensing authority: FCC
- Facility ID: 35215
- Class: A
- ERP: 6,000 watts
- HAAT: 85.6 meters (281 ft)
- Transmitter coordinates: 37°52′45″N 94°20′16″W

Links
- Public license information: Public file; LMS
- Webcast: Listen live
- Website: knemknmo.com

KNMO-FM (97.5 FM) is a radio station airing a country music format licensed to Nevada, Missouri. The station is owned by Harbit Communications, Inc.

Former logo
