= KJLU =

- Jefferson City, Missouri; United States
- Frequency: 88.9 MHz
- Branding: KJLU 88.9 FM

Programming
- Format: Smooth jazz, blues, gospel, classic soul, reggae, hip hop
- Affiliations: ABC News Radio

Ownership
- Owner: Lincoln University of Missouri; (Lincoln University Board of Curators)

History
- First air date: 1973
- Former call signs: KLUM-FM (1971–1992)
- Call sign meaning: "Jazz Lincoln University"

Technical information
- Licensing authority: FCC
- Facility ID: 37556
- Class: C2
- ERP: 29,500 watts
- HAAT: 184.0 meters (603.7 ft)
- Transmitter coordinates: 38°27′29″N 92°13′32″W

Links
- Public license information: Public file; LMS
- Website: kjluradio.com

KJLU (88.9 FM) is a radio station broadcasting a smooth jazz format. Licensed to Jefferson City, Missouri, United States, the station is owned by Lincoln University of Missouri.

== See also ==
- List of jazz radio stations in the United States
