= KHGG-FM =

Coordinates: 34.979°N 93.945°W

- Mansfield, Arkansas; United States
- Broadcast area: Fort Smith, Arkansas
- Frequency: 103.5 MHz

Programming
- Format: Silent

Ownership
- Owner: Pharis Broadcasting
- Sister stations: KAGE

History
- First air date: May 18, 1982 (as KRWA-FM)
- Former call signs: KRWA-FM (1982–2006)
- Former frequencies: 103.1 MHz (1984–2019)
- Call sign meaning: K HoG G (reference to Arkansas Razorbacks' nickname)

Technical information
- Licensing authority: FCC
- Facility ID: 12231
- Class: C2
- ERP: 6,100 watts
- HAAT: 412 meters

Links
- Public license information: Public file; LMS

KHGG-FM is a radio station in Mansfield, Arkansas, broadcasting at 103.5 MHz FM to the Fort Smith market, ranked by Arbitron as the nation's 176th largest market.

== History ==
The station was originally a low-power FM station with the call letters KRWA (K Radio Waldron Arkansas), playing country music and southern gospel. It was put on the air by Haskell Jones, who owned two radio stations in DeQueen at the time. KRWA went through a number of owners. After a power upgrade by Family Communications in 2003, it received a license to broadcast with 50,000 watts of power. The signal can currently be heard in most of Western Arkansas and Eastern Oklahoma.

Pharis Broadcasting purchased the station in 2003, installing an adult contemporary format. The station was known as "Hit 103" for nearly two years. In March 2005, the station installed an all sports format utilizing Fox Sports Radio.

On October 6, 2017, KHGG-FM went silent, while its programming remains on KAGE 1580 AM Van Buren.

Until October 2017, the station was the area's official home for Arkansas Razorbacks football, basketball, and baseball. It is also home of the Dallas Cowboys. Other area colleges and high school sporting events including the UAFS Lions basketball games can be heard on the station throughout the winter.

The station is owned and operated by Pharis Broadcasting.
