= KNEM =

- Nevada, Missouri; United States
- Frequency: 1240 kHz
- Branding: Sunny 99.9

Programming
- Format: Adult contemporary

Ownership
- Owner: Harbit Communications, Inc
- Sister stations: KNMO-FM

History
- First air date: 1949
- Call sign meaning: Nevada, Missouri

Technical information
- Licensing authority: FCC
- Facility ID: 35216
- Class: C
- Power: 500 watts unlimited
- Transmitter coordinates: 37.86028°N 94.38191°W
- Translator: 99.9 K260DP (Nevada)

Links
- Public license information: Public file; LMS
- Website: knemknmo.com

KNEM (1240 AM) is a radio station broadcasting an adult contemporary music format. Licensed to Nevada, Missouri, United States, the station is currently owned by Harbit Communications, Inc.

The station is co-owned with KNMO-FM, which broadcasts on 97.5 FM.

On October 3, 2023, KNEM dropped its simulcast with KNMO-FM and changed its format to adult contemporary, branded as "Sunny 99.9".
