= KXEO =

Radio station in Mexico, Missouri

- Mexico, Missouri; United States
- Broadcast area: Columbia, Missouri
- Frequency: 1340 kHz
- Branding: Your Local Radio AM 1340 KXEO

Programming
- Format: Adult contemporary

Ownership
- Owner: KXEO Radio, Inc.
- Sister stations: KWWR

History
- First air date: 1949

Technical information
- Licensing authority: FCC
- Facility ID: 35951
- Class: C
- Power: 960 watts
- Transmitter coordinates: 39°10′0″N 91°51′43″W

Links
- Public license information: Public file; LMS
- Website: kxeo.com

KXEO (1340 AM, "AM 1340 KXEO") is a radio station broadcasting an adult contemporary music format. Licensed to Mexico, Missouri, United States, the station serves the Columbia, Missouri area. The station was first licensed February 8, 1949. The station is currently owned by KXEO Radio, Inc. The station also broadcasts St. Louis Cardinals baseball.
