= KDVC (FM) =

- Columbia, Missouri; United States
- Broadcast area: Mid-Missouri
- Frequency: 98.3 MHz
- Branding: 98-3 The Dove

Programming
- Format: Soft adult contemporary

Ownership
- Owner: Iris Media
- Operator: Zimmer Radio Group

History
- First air date: November 9, 2016; 9 years ago
- Call sign meaning: DoVe Columbia

Technical information
- Licensing authority: FCC
- Facility ID: 198800
- Class: C3
- ERP: 9,500 watts
- HAAT: 113 meters (371 ft)
- Transmitter coordinates: 38.9553°N 92.2725°W

Links
- Public license information: Public file; LMS
- Webcast: Listen live
- Website: 983thedove.com

KDVC (98.3 MHz; "The Dove") is a FM radio station serving the Columbia, Missouri area. It broadcasts a mostly-automated soft adult contemporary format. The station is owned by Iris Media, with Zimmer Radio Group operating and managing KDVC through a local marketing agreement.

== History ==
From its launch on November 9, 2016, KDVC played commercial-free Christmas music as "K-Santa". At 12:01 am December 26 KDVC played "Faith" by George Michael (who had died the day before) as the official sign on of "98-3 the Dove". The station continues to play all-Christmas music in November and December of each year.

Initially, the station aired a Soft adult contemporary format that focused on music from the 1970s and 1980s. Over time, it has evolved into a mainstream Adult contemporary music station, playing music up to recent years. Its primary competitor is KPLA.

== Previous Stations on 98.3 FM ==
KDVC revived the 98.3 frequency in Columbia, which between 1971 and 2001 was occupied by KFMZ, a rock station. Its license was canceled in 2001 after a years-long revocation battle triggered when station owner Mike Rice was convicted of sexual misconduct with underage boys. After Rice's appeals on his criminal conviction and with the FCC were exhausted, KFMZ and all of its sister stations left the air on October 4, 2001.

The 98.3 frequency returned to the air in 2015 as a translator for the K-Love contemporary Christian network. To make way for the launch of KDVC, K-Love relocated to a former Zimmer Radio-held translator spot at 106.5 in September 2016.
