= Jefferson City, Missouri =

Capital city of Missouri, U.S.

Jefferson City
- State capital
- City of Jefferson
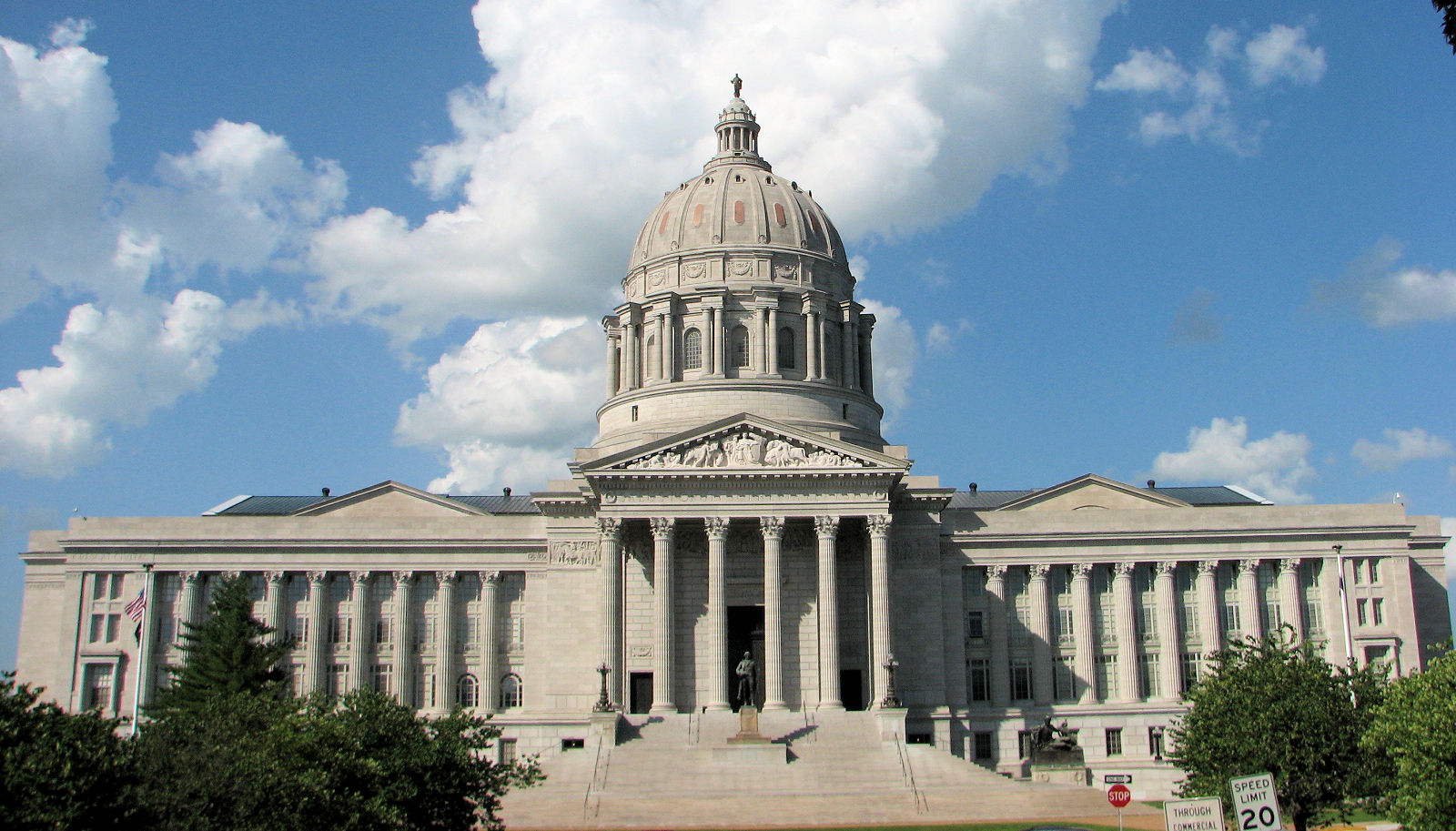
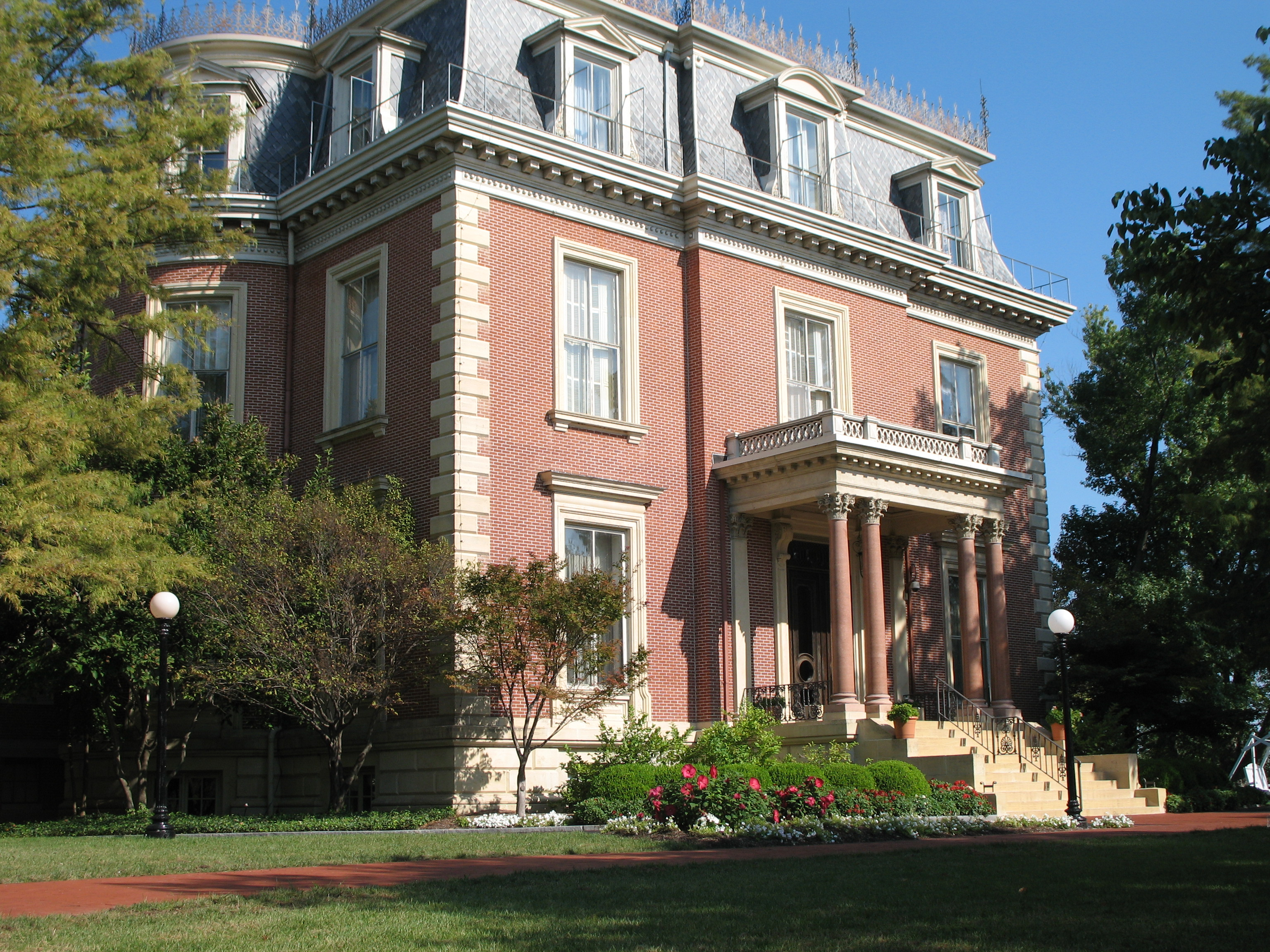
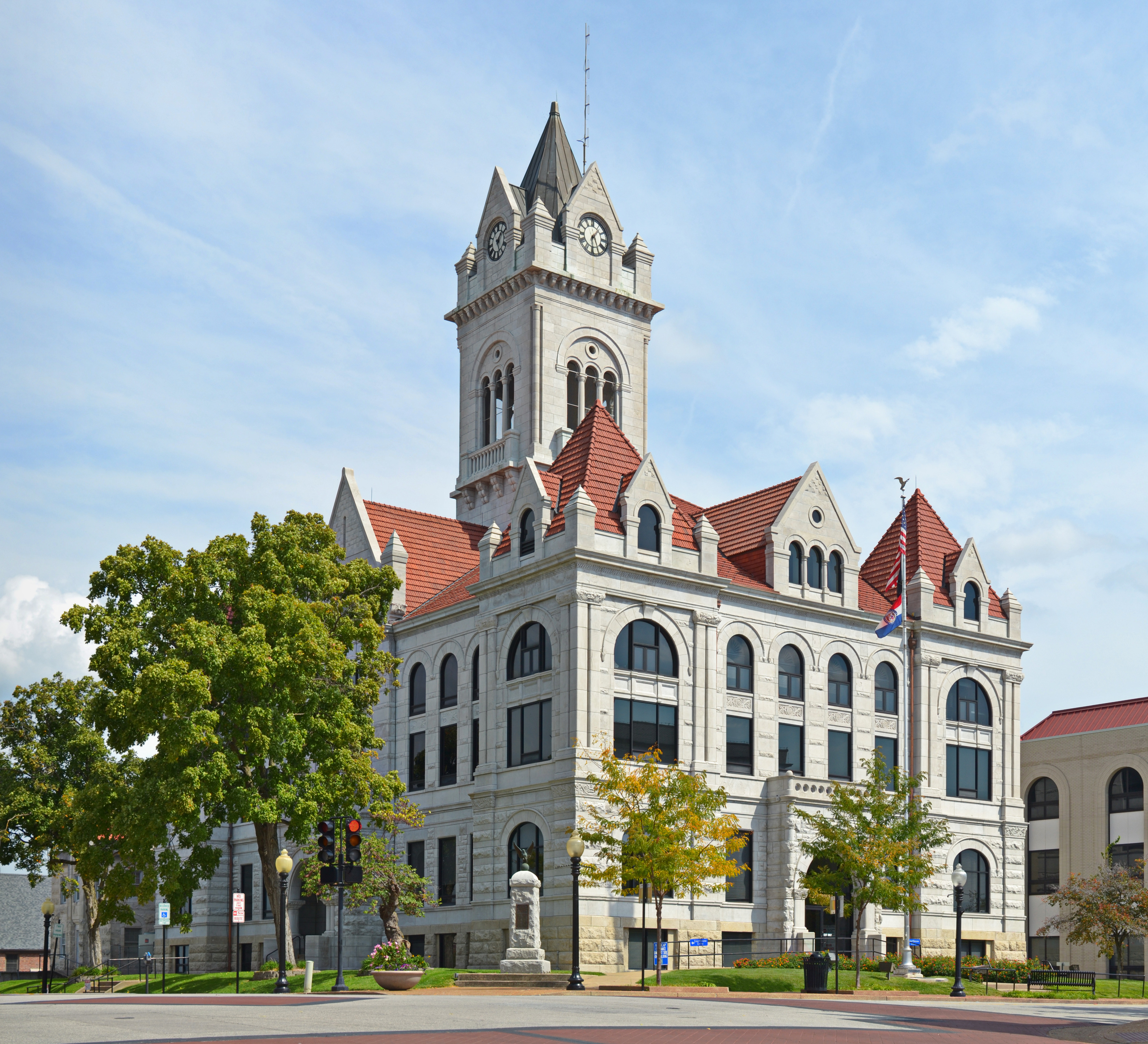
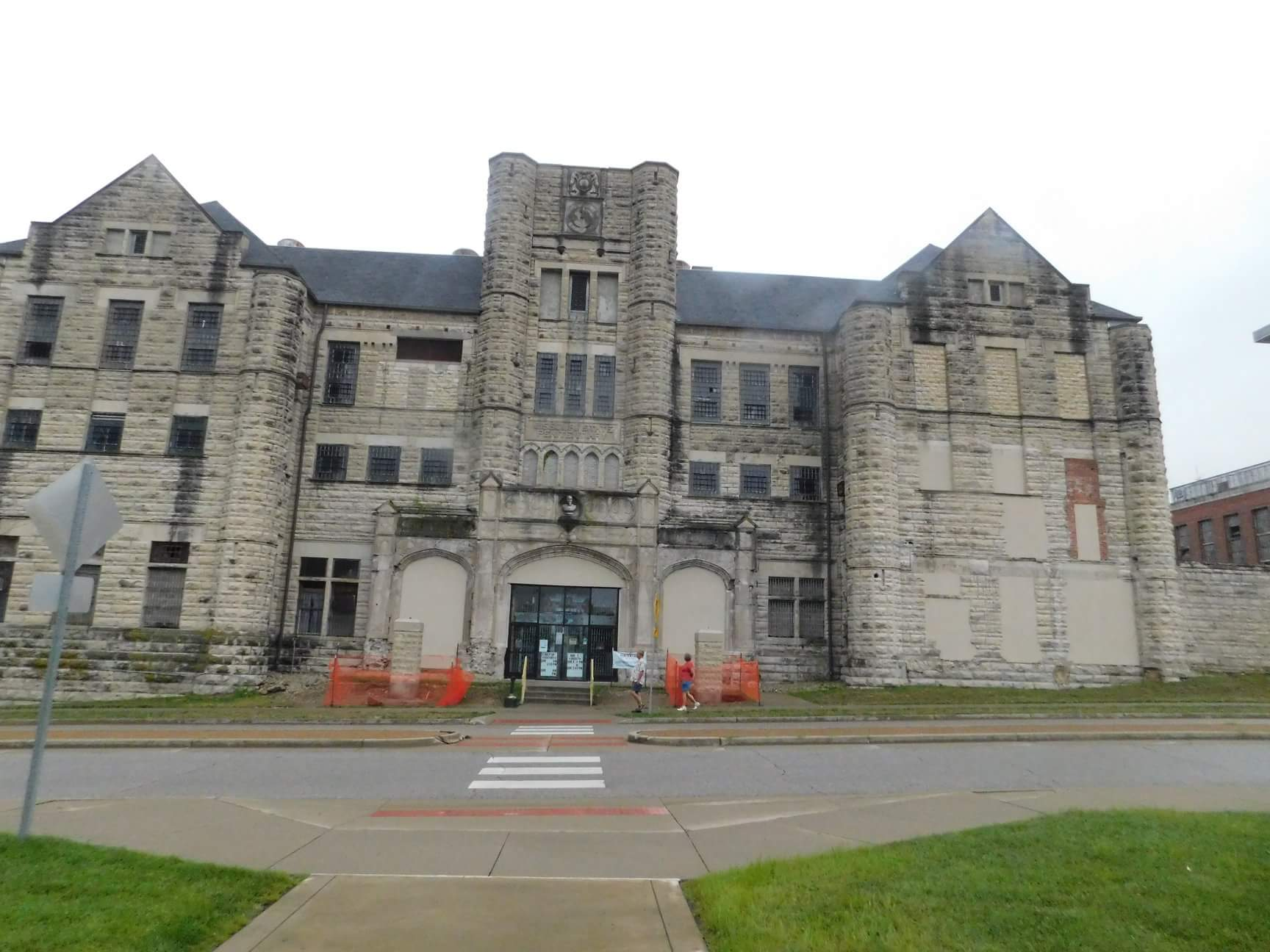
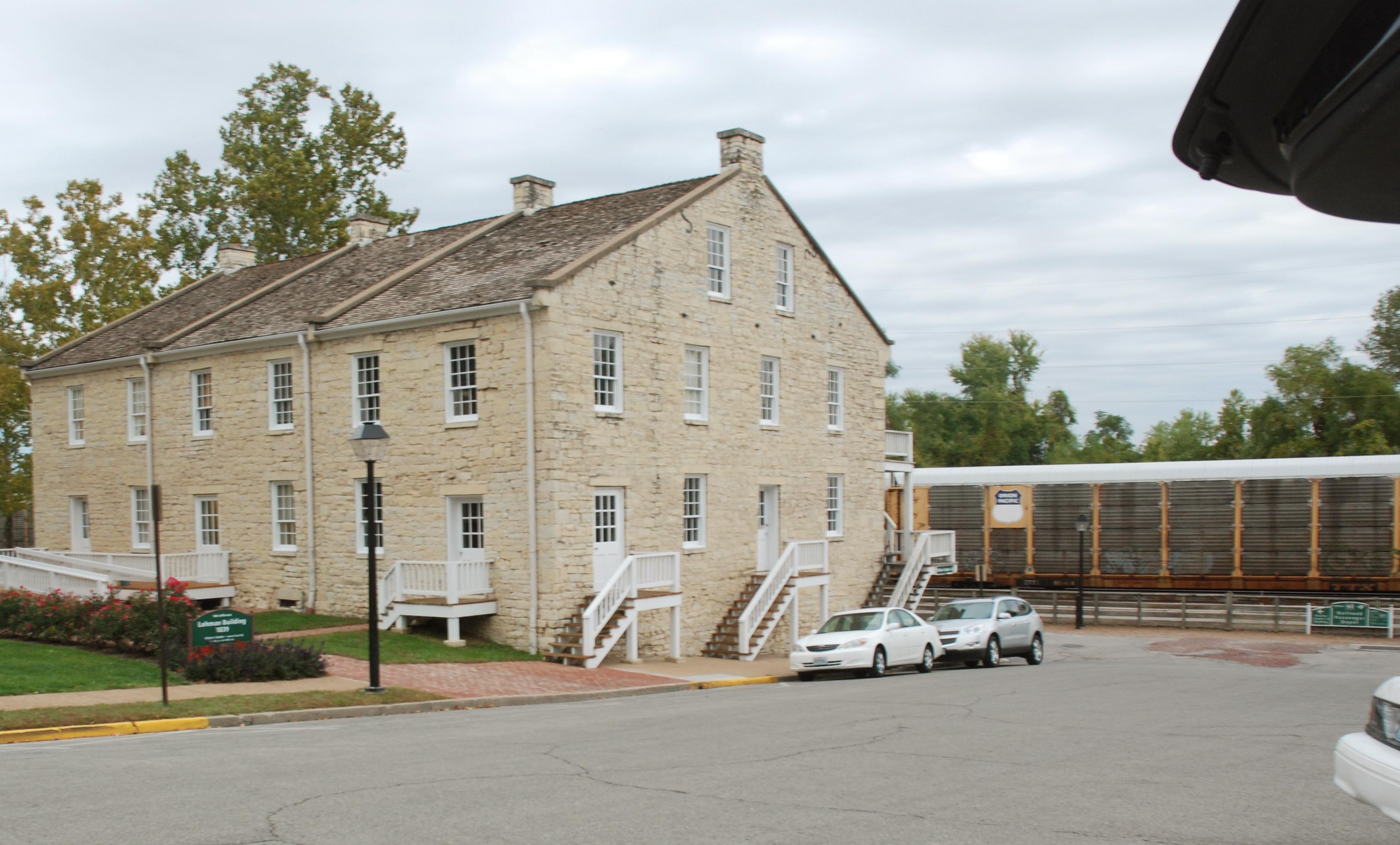
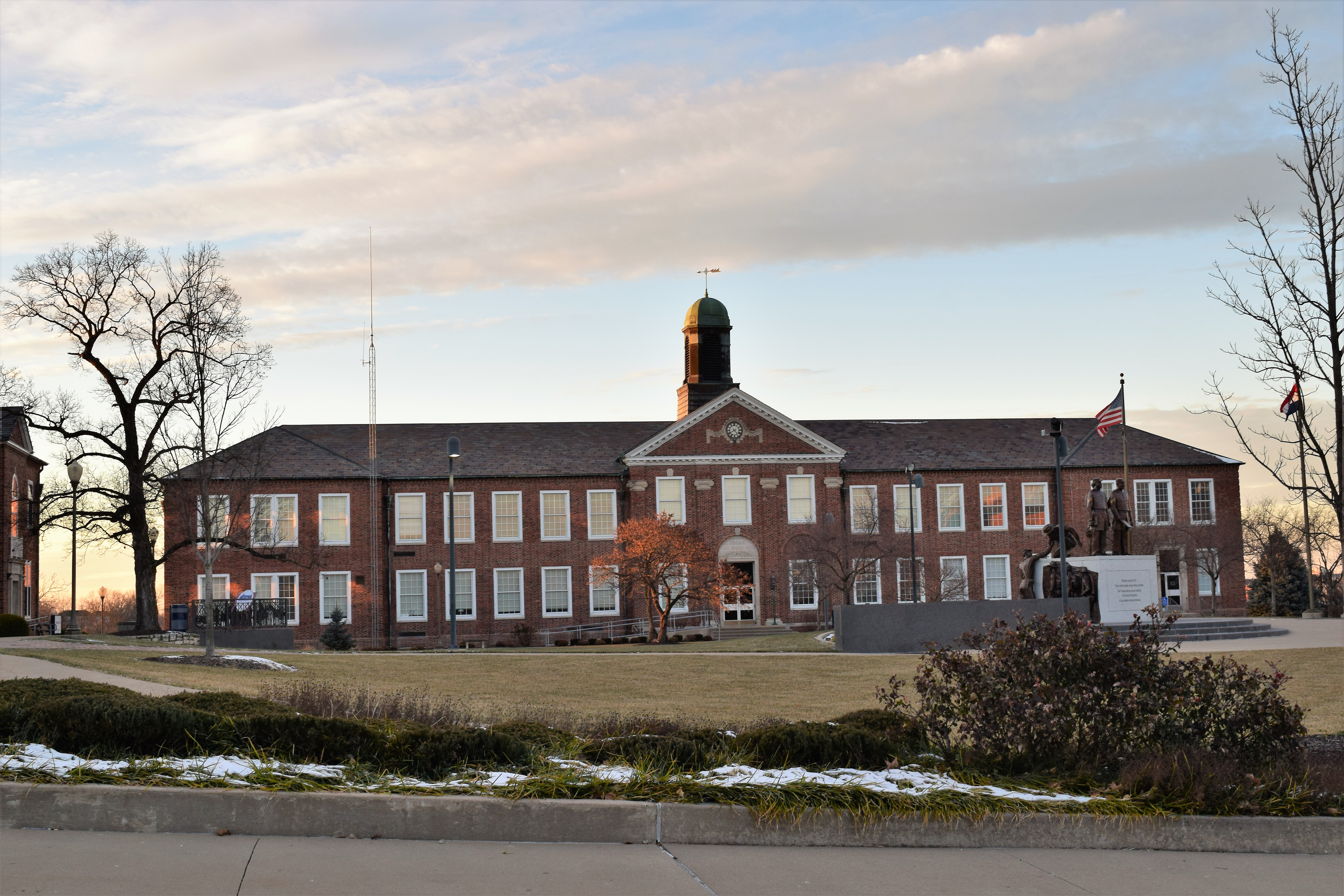
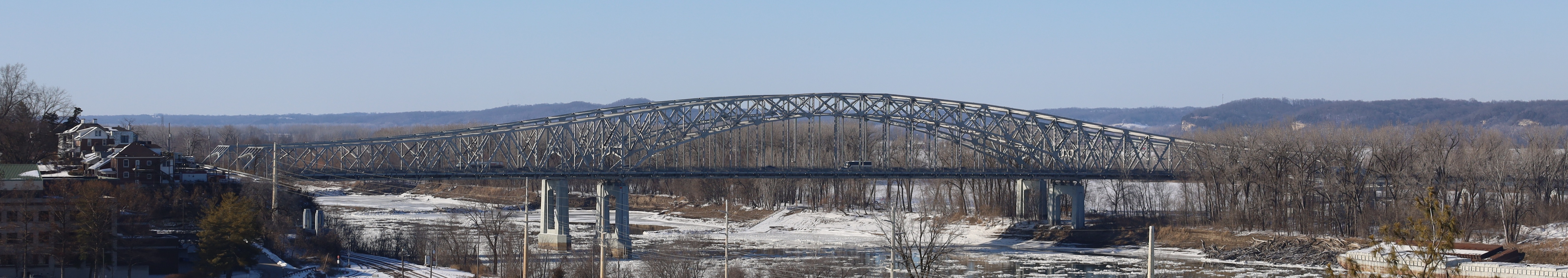
- Missouri State Capitol Missouri Governor's Mansion Cole County Courthouse Missouri State Penitentiary Jefferson Landing State Historic Site Lincoln University Senator Roy Blunt Bridge

- Flag Seal
- Nicknames: Jeff City, JC, JCMO
- Interactive map of Jefferson City
- Location within Missouri Location within the United States
- Coordinates: 38°34′04″N 92°10′33″W
- Country: United States
- State: Missouri
- Counties: Cole; Callaway
- Founded: 1821
- Incorporated: 1825
- Named for: Thomas Jefferson

Government
  - Type: Mayor–council
  - Mayor: Ron Fitzwater
  - Administrator: Brian Crane

Area
  - State capital: 37.65 sq mi (97.51 km^{2})
  - Land: 36.05 sq mi (93.38 km^{2})
  - Water: 1.59 sq mi (4.13 km^{2})
- Elevation: 630 ft (192 m)

Population (2020)
  - State capital: 43,228
  - Estimate (2024): 42,564
  - Density: 1,199.0/sq mi (462.93/km^{2})
  - Metro: 149,808
- Demonym: Jefferson Citian
- Time zone: UTC−6 (CST)
  - Summer (DST): UTC−5 (CDT)
- ZIP codes: 65101-65111
- Area codes: 573/235
- FIPS code: 29-37000
- GNIS ID: 758233
- Website: jeffersoncitymo.gov

Jefferson City, officially City of Jefferson and informally Jeff City, is the capital of the U.S. state of Missouri. It had a population of 43,228 at the 2020 United States census, ranking as the 16th most populous city in the state, but the 9th least populous U.S. state capital. It is also the county seat of Cole County and the principal city of the Jefferson City Metropolitan Statistical Area, the second-most-populous metropolitan area in Mid-Missouri and the fifth-most populous in the state. It forms part of the nine-county Columbia–Jefferson City–Moberly combined statistical area, which has 415,747 residents. Most of the city is located within Cole County, with a small northern section extending into adjacent Callaway County.

Jefferson City is named for Thomas Jefferson (1743–1826), the third President of the United States, 1801–1809, and earlier major author of the Declaration of Independence of the United States on July 4, 1776. He also served several diplomatic posts overseas in Europe and was the first U.S. Secretary of State (1790–1793) in the first President's Cabinet of George Washington, and subsequently the second Vice President (1797–1801) under second chief executive John Adams.

Jefferson City is located on the northern edge of the Ozark Plateau on the southern side of the Missouri River in a region known as Mid-Missouri, that is roughly mid-way between the state's two large urban areas of Kansas City to the west and St. Louis in the east (along the west bank of the Mississippi River). It is 29 miles (47 km) south of Columbia, Missouri, and sits at the western edge of the Missouri Rhineland, one of the major wine-producing regions of the Midwest. The city is dominated by the monumental domed Missouri State Capitol, which rises from a bluff overlooking the nearby Missouri River to the north. Lewis and Clark with their Corps of Discovery passed the bluff here on their historic expedition upriver in 1804, eventually journeying westward to the Pacific Northwest region and the Pacific Ocean, before Europeans or Americans established any settlement there.

Many of Jefferson City's primary employers are in service and manufacturing industries like Hitachi. Jefferson City is also home to Lincoln University, a public historically black and federal land-grant university founded the year after the American Civil War in 1866, by the Union Army black veterans of the First Missouri Regiment of Colored Infantry & 62nd Regiment of U.S. Colored Troops with support from the Second Missouri Regiment of Colored Infantry / 65th Regiment of U.S. Colored Troops.

== History ==
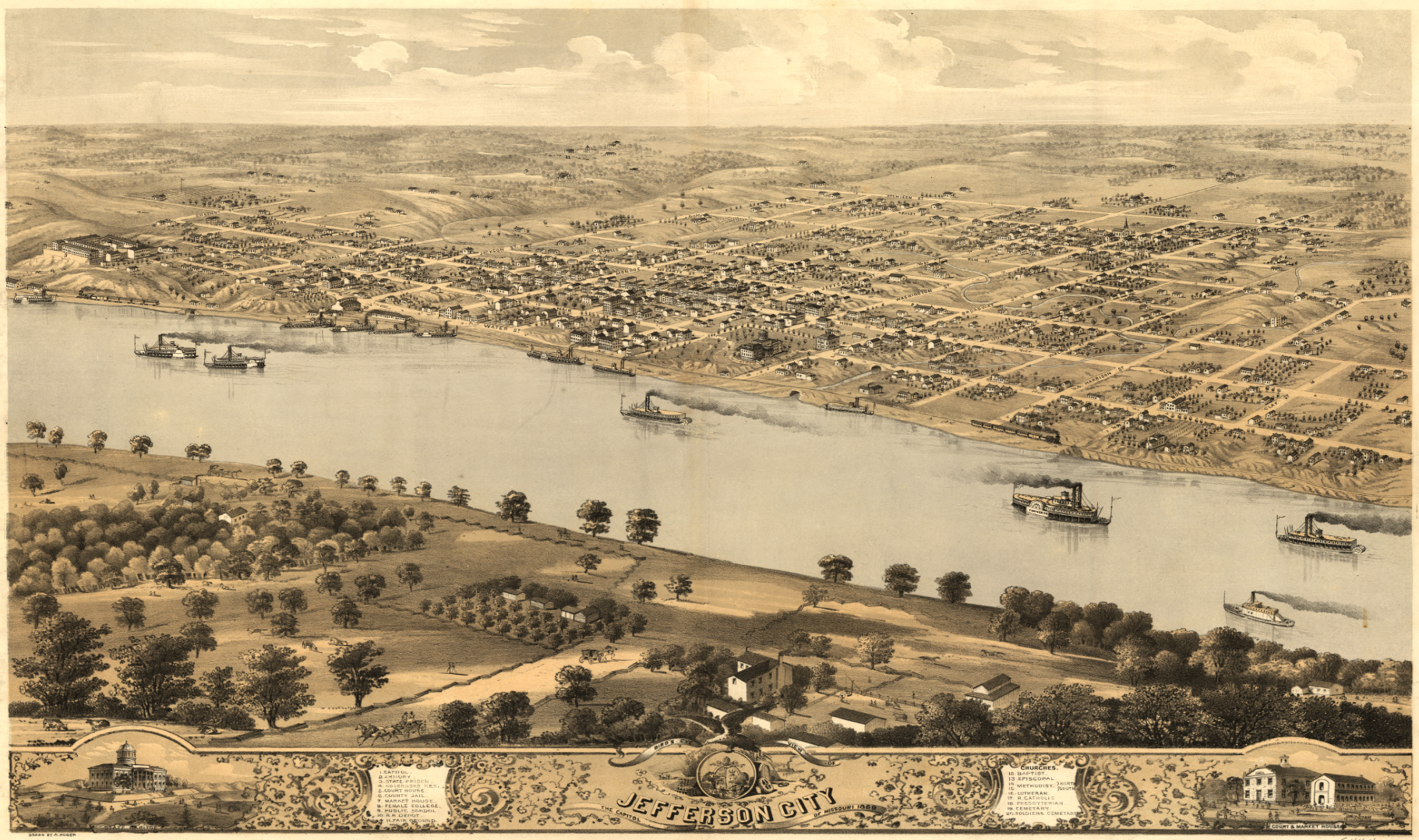
A sketch of Jefferson City from the 1860s

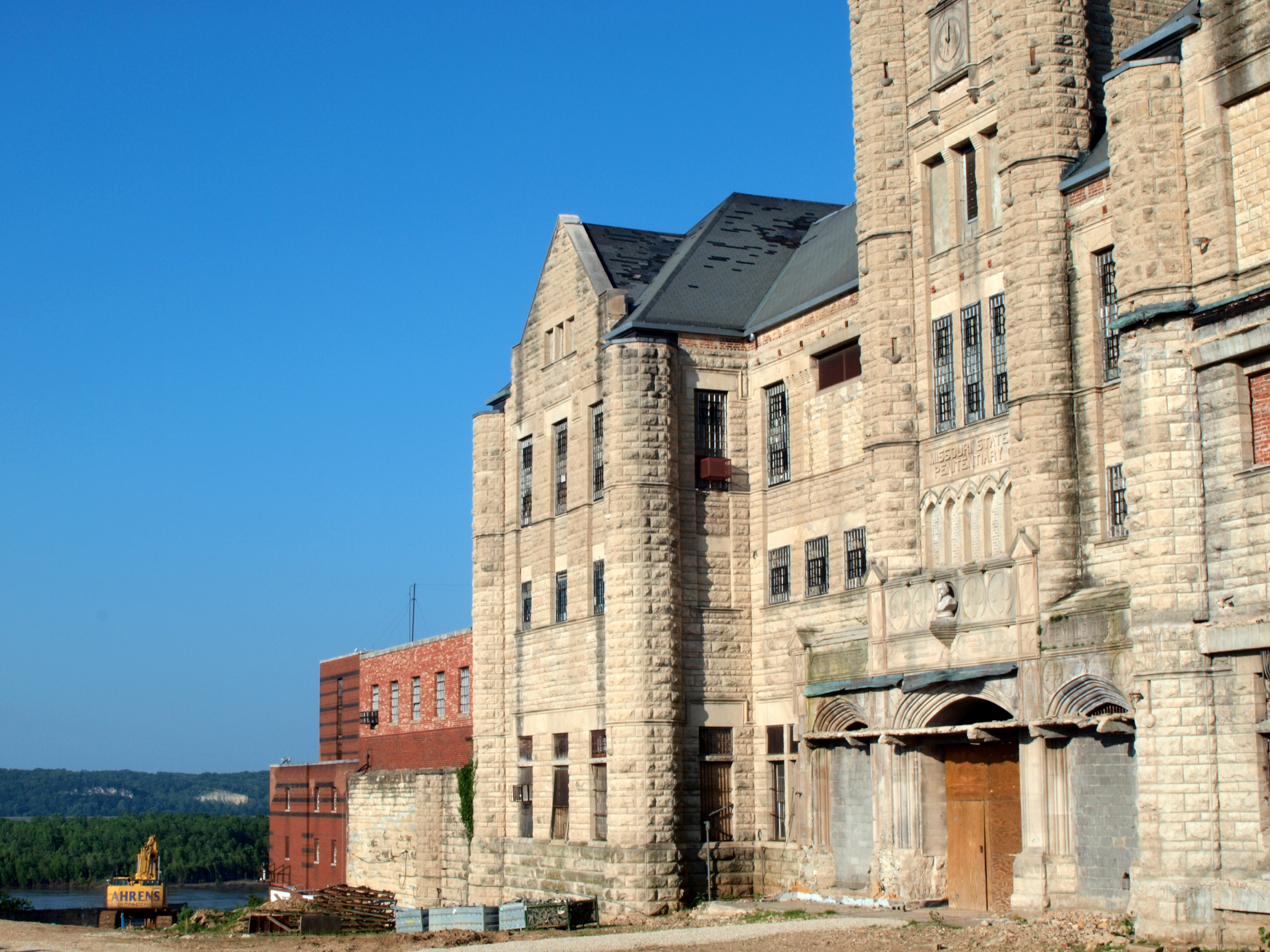
Missouri State Penitentiary

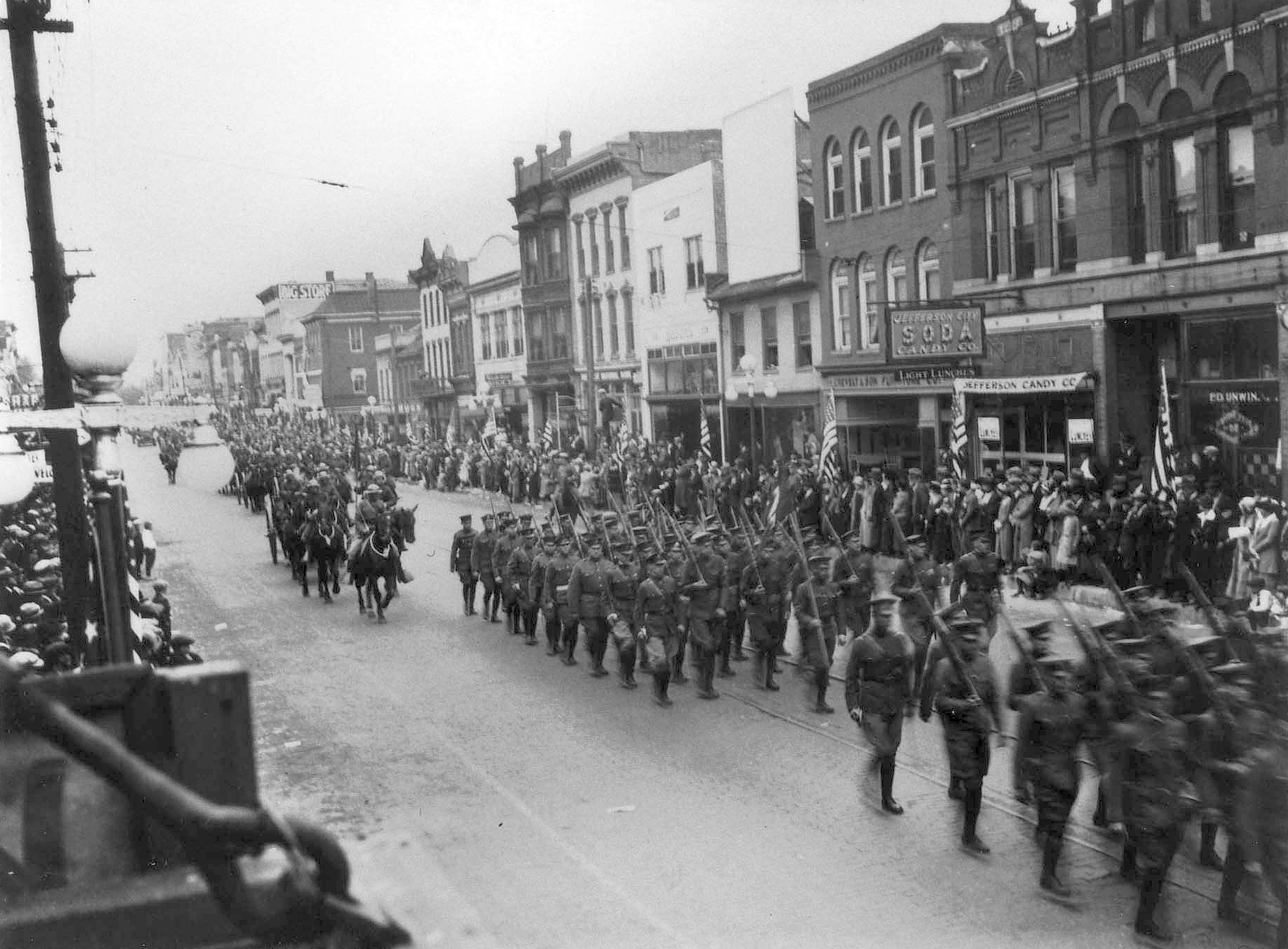
A parade on "New Capitol Day", October 6, 1924, to celebrate the dedication of the newly constructed Missouri State Capitol.

In pre-Columbian times, this region was home of an ancient people known today as the Mound Builders, likely related to the Mississippian societies. They were subsequently replaced by Osage Native Americans. In the late 17th century, frontiersmen began to inhabit the area, including Antoine de la Mothe Cadillac, Louis Jolliet, Jacques Marquette, Robert de LaSalle, and Daniel Boone, with the latter having the greatest influence on the region. Famed Western explorer and settler Daniel Boone's son, Daniel Morgan Boone (1769–1839), would later lay out and plat Jefferson City in the early 19th century.

When the Missouri Territory was organized in 1812, St. Louis was Missouri's seat of government for the territorial governor and territorial legislature. Later St. Charles would serve as the next capital town of the old Territory. Jefferson City was chosen as the new state capital in 1821, after Missouri was admitted to the Union as the 24th State. The village on the southern banks of the Missouri River was first called "Lohman's Landing", and when the new state legislature decided to relocate there, they proposed the name "Missouriopolis" before settling on "Jefferson" to honor former President Thomas Jefferson, who would still live at his Virginia home estate of Monticello for the next five years.

Over the years, the city was most often referred to as "Jefferson City"; the common name eventually stuck. For years, this village was little more than a trading post located in the wilderness about midway between St. Louis and Kansas City. In 1825, the settlement was formally incorporated, and a year later, the state legislature of the General Assembly of Missouri moved to Jefferson City, where they would continue to meet.

Jefferson City was also chosen by the lawmakers as the site of a state prison. This prison, named the Missouri State Penitentiary, opened in 1836. This prison was the unfortunate home to multiple infamous Americans, including former heavyweight boxing champion Sonny Liston, Martin Luther King Jr. assassin James Earl Ray, and infamous 1930s bank robber Pretty Boy Floyd.

During the American Civil War (1861–1865), Jefferson City was occupied by Union / Federal troops. The elected state legislature of the General Assembly were driven from Jefferson City by Union Army General Nathaniel Lyon (1818–1861). Some of the rebelling legislators later reconvened in nearby Neosho and passed an ordinance of secession from the Federal Union.

Missouri was claimed by both the southern Confederacy and the Federal Union of the remaining United States, as was neighboring border state of Kentucky to the east, also split by the impending conflict of civil war. Missourians were strongly divided and many people in the state—especially in St. Louis—supported the Union, while other areas of the state, such as Missouri's Little Dixie were strongly pro-Confederate, further west along the Missouri River between Jefferson City and Kansas City.

German immigrants created vineyards in small towns on either side of the Missouri River, especially on the north from the city east to Marthasville, located outside of St. Louis. Known as the "Missouri Rhineland" for its vineyards and first established by German immigrants in the mid-1800s, this region has become part of Missouri's agricultural and tourist economy.

=== 2019 tornado ===
Approximately 15 minutes before midnight on May 22, 2019, a tornado emergency was issued for the Jefferson City area. Minutes later, a destructive EF3 tornado caused extensive damage on the southwest side of the city. At least 20 people were injured, but none were killed due to this tornado. The tornado originally touched down west of Eldon before heading its way to Jefferson City.

== Geography ==
According to the United States Census Bureau, the city has a total area of 37.58 square miles (97.33 km^{2}), of which 35.95 square miles (93.11 km^{2}) is land and 1.63 square miles (4.22 km^{2}) is water.

=== Climate ===
Jefferson City has a humid continental climate (Köppen Dfa) with hot, rainy summers and cold winters. The city borders on having a humid subtropical climate but falls just short due to January having a mean temperature of 30 °F (−1 °C) which is below the 32 °F (0 °C) isotherm. Thunderstorms are common in both the spring and summer. Light snow is common during the winter, although about half of wintertime precipitation falls as rain.

Climate data for Jefferson City WTP, Missouri (1991–2020 normals, extremes 1894–present)
Month	Jan	Feb	Mar	Apr	May	Jun	Jul	Aug	Sep	Oct	Nov	Dec	Year
Record high °F (°C)	79 (26)	89 (32)	97 (36)	96 (36)	102 (39)	107 (42)	114 (46)	111 (44)	107 (42)	96 (36)	88 (31)	79 (26)	114 (46)
Mean maximum °F (°C)	65.3 (18.5)	71.7 (22.1)	79.8 (26.6)	85.8 (29.9)	89.6 (32.0)	93.8 (34.3)	97.5 (36.4)	97.6 (36.4)	92.2 (33.4)	86.4 (30.2)	75.7 (24.3)	68.3 (20.2)	99.2 (37.3)
Mean daily maximum °F (°C)	39.6 (4.2)	45.1 (7.3)	55.5 (13.1)	66.6 (19.2)	75.2 (24.0)	83.9 (28.8)	88.0 (31.1)	87.2 (30.7)	79.9 (26.6)	68.5 (20.3)	55.1 (12.8)	44.0 (6.7)	65.7 (18.7)
Daily mean °F (°C)	30.3 (−0.9)	34.9 (1.6)	44.6 (7.0)	55.2 (12.9)	64.9 (18.3)	74.1 (23.4)	78.3 (25.7)	76.9 (24.9)	69.0 (20.6)	57.2 (14.0)	45.0 (7.2)	34.9 (1.6)	55.4 (13.0)
Mean daily minimum °F (°C)	21.0 (−6.1)	24.7 (−4.1)	33.7 (0.9)	43.8 (6.6)	54.6 (12.6)	64.3 (17.9)	68.6 (20.3)	66.6 (19.2)	58.1 (14.5)	45.8 (7.7)	34.8 (1.6)	25.7 (−3.5)	45.1 (7.3)
Mean minimum °F (°C)	1.4 (−17.0)	7.2 (−13.8)	16.0 (−8.9)	29.2 (−1.6)	39.8 (4.3)	52.7 (11.5)	58.1 (14.5)	56.1 (13.4)	42.8 (6.0)	29.8 (−1.2)	19.0 (−7.2)	7.9 (−13.4)	−2.2 (−19.0)
Record low °F (°C)	−23 (−31)	−25 (−32)	−16 (−27)	13 (−11)	24 (−4)	38 (3)	42 (6)	41 (5)	29 (−2)	14 (−10)	1 (−17)	−24 (−31)	−25 (−32)
Average precipitation inches (mm)	2.21 (56)	2.30 (58)	3.24 (82)	4.78 (121)	5.17 (131)	4.20 (107)	4.35 (110)	4.13 (105)	4.24 (108)	3.44 (87)	3.24 (82)	2.30 (58)	43.60 (1,107)
Average snowfall inches (cm)	2.9 (7.4)	2.9 (7.4)	0.4 (1.0)	0.0 (0.0)	0.0 (0.0)	0.0 (0.0)	0.0 (0.0)	0.0 (0.0)	0.0 (0.0)	0.0 (0.0)	0.2 (0.51)	2.5 (6.4)	8.9 (23)
Average precipitation days (≥ 0.01 in)	7.9	7.5	11.0	11.5	12.2	9.7	8.5	8.1	7.8	9.4	8.5	8.1	110.2
Average snowy days (≥ 0.1 in)	1.9	1.1	0.4	0.0	0.0	0.0	0.0	0.0	0.0	0.0	0.3	1.4	5.1
Source: NOAA

== Demographics ==
Historical population
Census	Pop.	Note	%±
1860	3,082		—
1870	4,420		43.4%
1880	5,271		19.3%
1890	6,742		27.9%
1900	9,664		43.3%
1910	11,850		22.6%
1920	14,490		22.3%
1930	21,596		49.0%
1940	24,268		12.4%
1950	25,099		3.4%
1960	28,228		12.5%
1970	32,407		14.8%
1980	33,619		3.7%
1990	35,481		5.5%
2000	39,636		11.7%
2010	43,079		8.7%
2020	43,228		0.3%
2025 (est.)	42,489		−1.7%
U.S. Decennial Census

=== 2020 census ===
As of the 2020 census, Jefferson City had a population of 43,228 in 17,305 households and 9,327 families.

The median age was 39.4 years. 20.1% of residents were under the age of 18 and 17.7% of residents were 65 years of age or older. For every 100 females there were 107.0 males, and for every 100 females age 18 and over there were 107.3 males age 18 and over.

91.9% of residents lived in urban areas, while 8.1% lived in rural areas.

Among households, 26.6% had children under the age of 18 living in them. Of all households, 39.2% were married-couple households, 20.2% were households with a male householder and no spouse or partner present, and 33.8% were households with a female householder and no spouse or partner present. About 37.1% of all households were made up of individuals and 14.0% had someone living alone who was 65 years of age or older.

There were 19,219 housing units, of which 10.0% were vacant. The homeowner vacancy rate was 2.1% and the rental vacancy rate was 9.2%.

Racial composition as of the 2020 census
Race	Number	Percent
White	32,130	74.3%
Black or African American	6,841	15.8%
American Indian and Alaska Native	131	0.3%
Asian	786	1.8%
Native Hawaiian and Other Pacific Islander	43	0.1%
Some other race	566	1.3%
Two or more races	2,731	6.3%
Hispanic or Latino (of any race)	1,554	3.6%

=== 2016–2020 American Community Survey ===
The 2016–2020 5-year American Community Survey estimates show that the median household income was $54,003 (with a margin of error of ± $2,176) and the median family income was $75,490 (± $7,940). Males had a median income of $35,561 (± $4,299) versus $31,226 (± $1,953) for females. The median income for those above 16 years old was $32,642 (± $2,031). Approximately, 8.8% of families and 11.9% of the population were below the poverty line, including 17.8% of those under the age of 18 and 6.9% of those ages 65 or over.

=== 2010 census ===
At the 2010 census, there were 43,079 people in 17,278 households, including 9,969 families, in the city. The population density was 1,198.3 inhabitants per square mile (462.7/km^{2}). There were 18,852 housing units at an average density of 524.4 units per square mile (202.5 units/km^{2}). The racial makeup of the city was 78.0% White, 16.9% African American, 0.3% Native American, 1.8% Asian, 0.1% Pacific Islander, 0.8% from other races, and 2.2% from two or more races. Hispanic or Latino people of any race were 2.6%.

Of the 17,278 households 28.8% had children under the age of 18 living with them, 41.6% were married couples living together, 12.4% had a female householder with no husband present, 3.7% had a male householder with no wife present, and 42.3% were non-families. 36.2% of households were one person and 11.5% were one person aged 65 or older. The average household size was 2.21 and the average family size was 2.89.

The age distribution was 20.9% of residents under the age of 18, 10.3% between the ages of 18 and 24, 28.6% from 25 to 44, 26.8% from 45 to 64, and 13.4% 65 or older. The median age was 37.5 years. The gender makeup of the city was 51.2% male and 48.8% female.

=== 2000 census ===
At the 2000 census, there were 39,636 people in 15,794 households, including 9,207 families, in the city. The population density was 1,454.4 inhabitants per square mile (561.5/km^{2}). There were 16,987 housing units at an average density of 623.3 units per square mile (240.7 units/km^{2}). The racial makeup of the city was 81.5% White, 14.7% Black or African American, 0.4% Native American, 1.2% Asian, 0.1% Pacific Islander, 0.6% from other races, and 1.5% from two or more races. 1.6% of the population were Hispanic or Latino of any race.

Of the 15,794 households 27.9% had children under the age of 18 living with them, 44.4% were married couples living together, 10.8% had a female householder with no husband present, and 41.7% were non-families. 36.1% of households were one person and 11.9% were one person aged 65 or older. The average household size was 2.21 and the average family size was 2.90.

The age distribution was 20.9% under the age of 18, 11.0% from 18 to 24, 32.1% from 25 to 44, 22.0% from 45 to 64, and 14.0% 65 or older. The median age was 36 years. For every 100 females, there were 105.3 males. For every 100 females age 18 and over, there were 106.6 males.

The median household income was $39,628 and the median family income was $52,627. Males had a median income of $35,050 versus $25,521 for females. The per capita income for the city was $21,268. About 7.3% of families and 11.5% of the population were below the poverty line, including 17.1% of those under age 18 and 7.1% of those age 65 or over.

== Economy ==
Jefferson City's top employers (2016)
Rank	Employers	# of employees
1	State of Missouri	14,223
2	Capital Region Medical Center	1,573
3	Scholastic	1,500
4	Jefferson City Public Schools	1,489
5	SSM Health-St. Mary's Hospital	1,154
6	Central Bancompany	967
7	ABB Power T&D Company	775
8	Jefferson City Medical Group	633
9	Wal-Mart Supercenter	622
10	Unilever	510
No change reported in 2017

Jefferson City's economy is driven by its residents, citizens of surrounding communities, and tourists.

=== Business ===
Jefferson City's economy relies on government, health care, manufacturing, retail, education, and tourism. In 2016, Jefferson City's gross metropolitan product was $7.366 billion and Missouri's real total gross domestic product was $260.309 billion; therefore, Jefferson City's economy accounted for 2.829% of the state's total gross domestic product.

Central Bancompany, Hawthorn Bancshares, Capital Region Medical Center, and Arris Pizza all have their headquarters in Jefferson City. Jefferson City is also home to Central Dairy, whose products are shipped statewide.

=== Tourism ===
Tourists are drawn to the Missouri State Capitol, St. Peter Church (adjacent to the capitol), Missouri State Penitentiary, Missouri Governor's Mansion, and Missouri State Museum. Lincoln University, ranked by U.S. News & World Report in 2007 as a top educational institution for international students, also helps draw students and tourists from other states and countries.

== Government ==
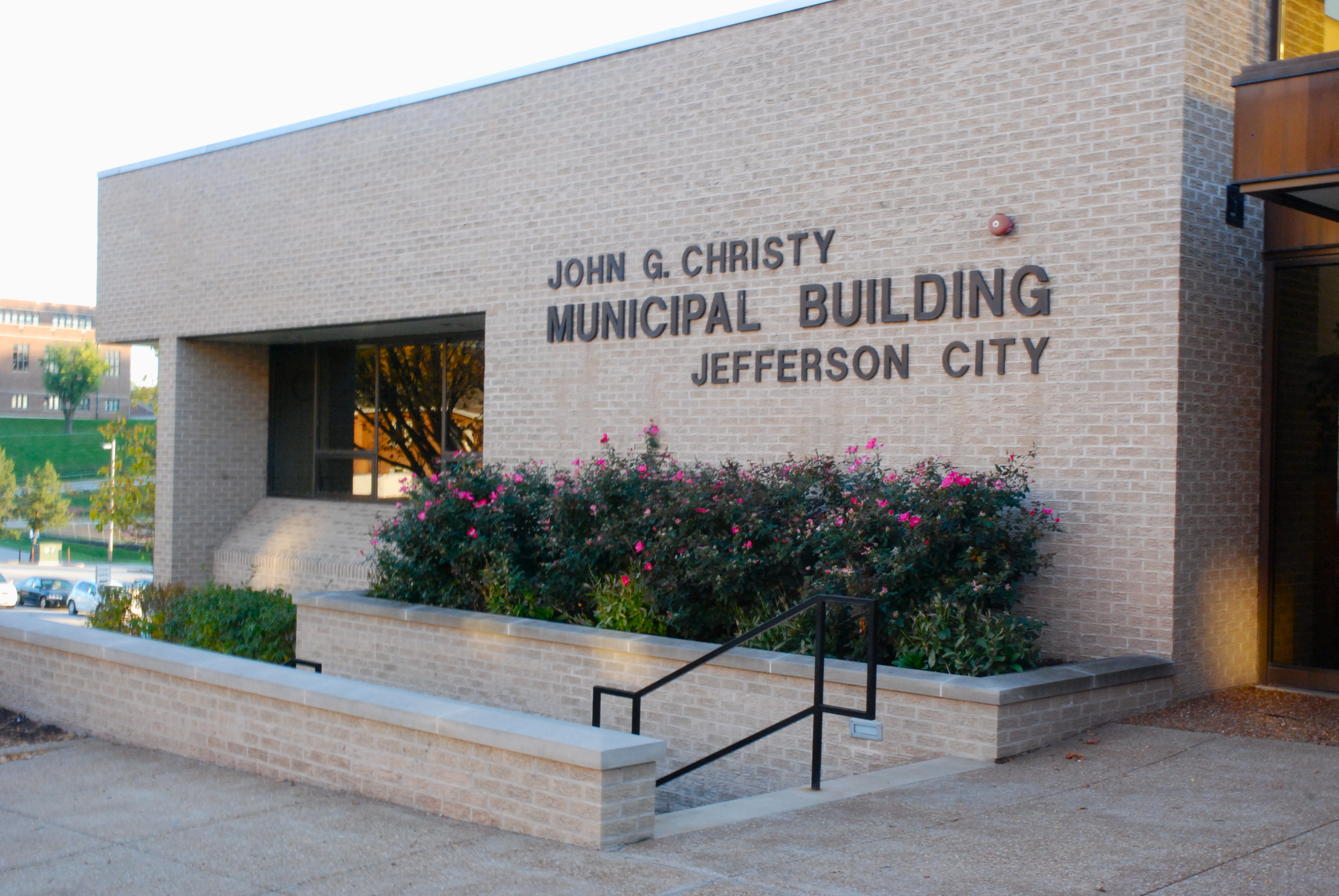
The John G. Christy Municipal Building houses the city hall.

=== State government ===
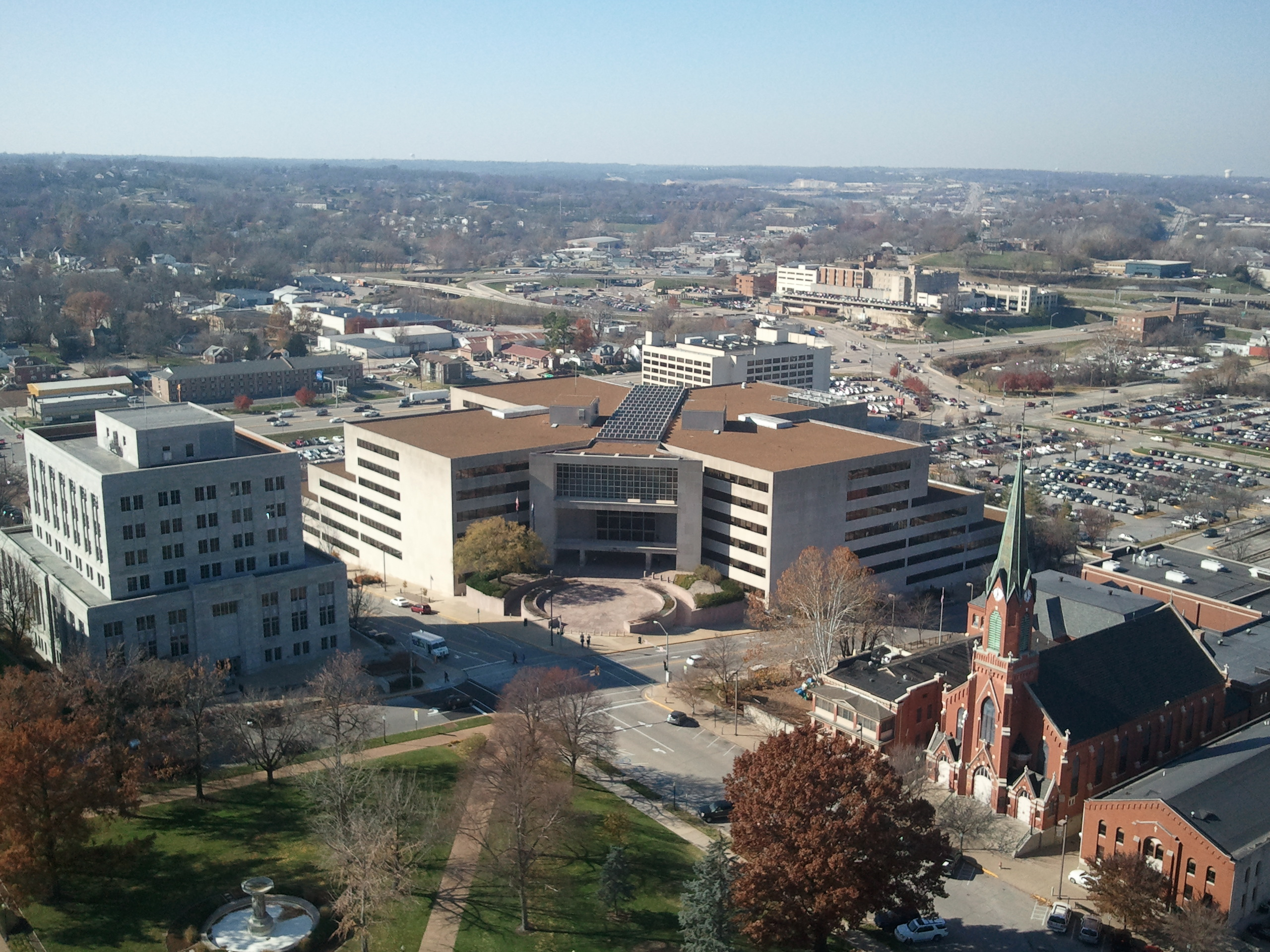
The Harry S Truman office building houses government workers for various state departments and agencies.

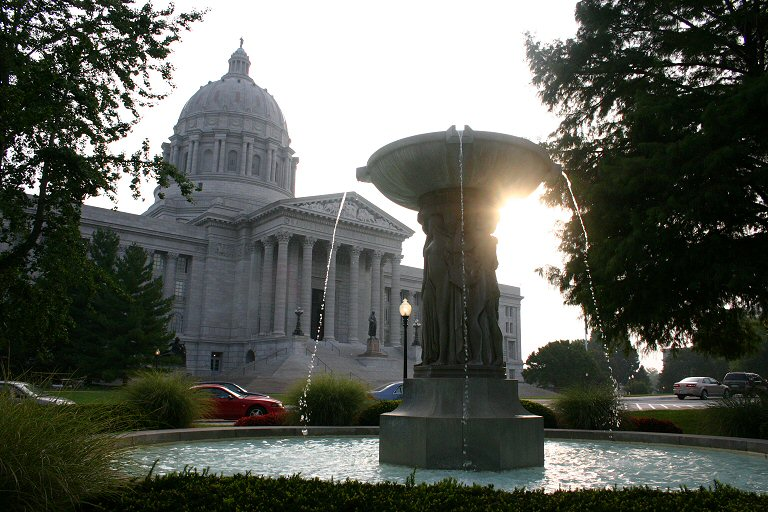
The Missouri State Capitol in Jefferson City

The State Capitol is located in Jefferson City. In addition, state agencies are headquartered in Jefferson City. The Missouri State Archives is located in Jefferson City.

The Missouri Department of Corrections (MDOC) operates the Jefferson City Correctional Center (JCCC) and the Algoa Correctional Center (ACC) in Jefferson City. JCCC replaced the Missouri State Penitentiary in September 2004, which until its closure was the oldest operating penal facility west of the Mississippi River. It served as the State of Missouri's primary maximum security institution, and it housed male death row prisoners until April 1989, when they were moved to the Potosi Correctional Center.

=== Federal government ===
The United States Postal Service operates several postal facilities. The Jefferson City Main Post Office building previously shared occupancy with the U.S. District Court from its dedication in November 1934 until September 2011, when it moved into the Christopher S. Bond Court House. The 118,000-square-foot courthouse is named for the former Governor and United States Senator from Missouri.

The courthouse, which is occupied by the Central Division of the United States District Court for the Western District of Missouri and under the appellate jurisdiction of the United States Court of Appeals for the Eighth Circuit, was designed to achieve the U.S. Green Building Council's LEED Gold rating. Sustainable design features include reducing water use by 44 percent, using 13 percent recycled content, and diverting 80 percent of construction waste materials from landfills. The building is 36 percent more efficient than current energy standards.

== Education ==
=== Schools ===
Jefferson City Public School District operates Jefferson City High School and Capital City High School, two middle schools, Thomas Jefferson Middle School, and Lewis and Clark Middle School, and eleven elementary schools. There are five private elementary schools and three private high schools, including Helias High School and Calvary Lutheran High School in the city.

=== Colleges and universities ===
Lincoln University is a public historically black university with open enrollment and certificate, associate, bachelor, and graduate programs.

Columbia College, William Woods University, Metro Business College, and Merrell University have campuses in the city, with varying degree levels and options.

The University of Missouri, the state's flagship university, is 30 miles to the north in Columbia.

=== Public library ===
Jefferson City has a public library, the Missouri River Regional Library.

== Media ==
=== Print ===
The major daily English-language newspaper in the area is the Jefferson City News Tribune. Several monthly magazines cover Jefferson City and/or the surrounding areas: Jefferson City Magazine, Her Magazine, Capital Lifestyles, and Professional Day.

=== Television ===
Jefferson City, along with Columbia, is part of the Mid-Missouri television market. KRCG, the region's CBS affiliate, and KFDR, a station owned by the Christian Television Network (CTN), are both licensed to the city.

=== Radio ===
List of radio stations that broadcast from and/or are licensed to Jefferson City, Missouri.
Frequency	Callsign	Nickname	Format	Owner	City of License
88.1	KHJR	Covenant Network	Catholic	Covenant Network	St. Thomas, MO
88.9	KJLU	88.9 KJLU	Jazz	Lincoln University of Missouri	Jefferson City, MO
89.9	KMCV		Religion	Bott Radio	High Point, MO
90.3	KNLG	Here's Help Network	Religion	New Life Evangelistic Center	New Bloomfield, MO
94.3	KATI	KAT Country 94.3	Country	Zimmer Radio Group	California, MO
97.1	K246CA		Religion	Bott Radio	Jefferson City, MO
97.5	KJMO	97.5 KJMO	Classic Hits	Cumulus Media	Linn, MO
98.7	KOTC	3ABN	Religion	Jefferson City Seventh-Day Adventist Church	Jefferson City, MO
100.1	KBBM	100.1 NASH FM	Country	Cumulus Media	Jefferson City, MO
103.5	K278CT	News Talk 1240	News/Talk	Cumulus Media	Jefferson City, MO
104.5	K283CL	NewsRadio KWOS	News/Talk	Zimmer Radio Group	Jefferson City, MO
104.9	K283CL	Elevate FM	Contemporary Worship Music	Lake Area Educational Broadcasting Foundation	Jefferson City, MO
106.5	K293AX	Spirit FM	Christian Contemporary	Lake Area Educational Broadcasting Foundation	Jefferson City, MO
106.9	KTXY	Y107	Mainstream Top 40	Zimmer Radio Group	Jefferson City, MO
950	KWOS	NewsRadio KWOS	News/Talk	Zimmer Radio Group	Jefferson City, MO
1240	KLIK	News Talk 1240	News/Talk	Cumulus Media	Jefferson City, MO

== Infrastructure ==
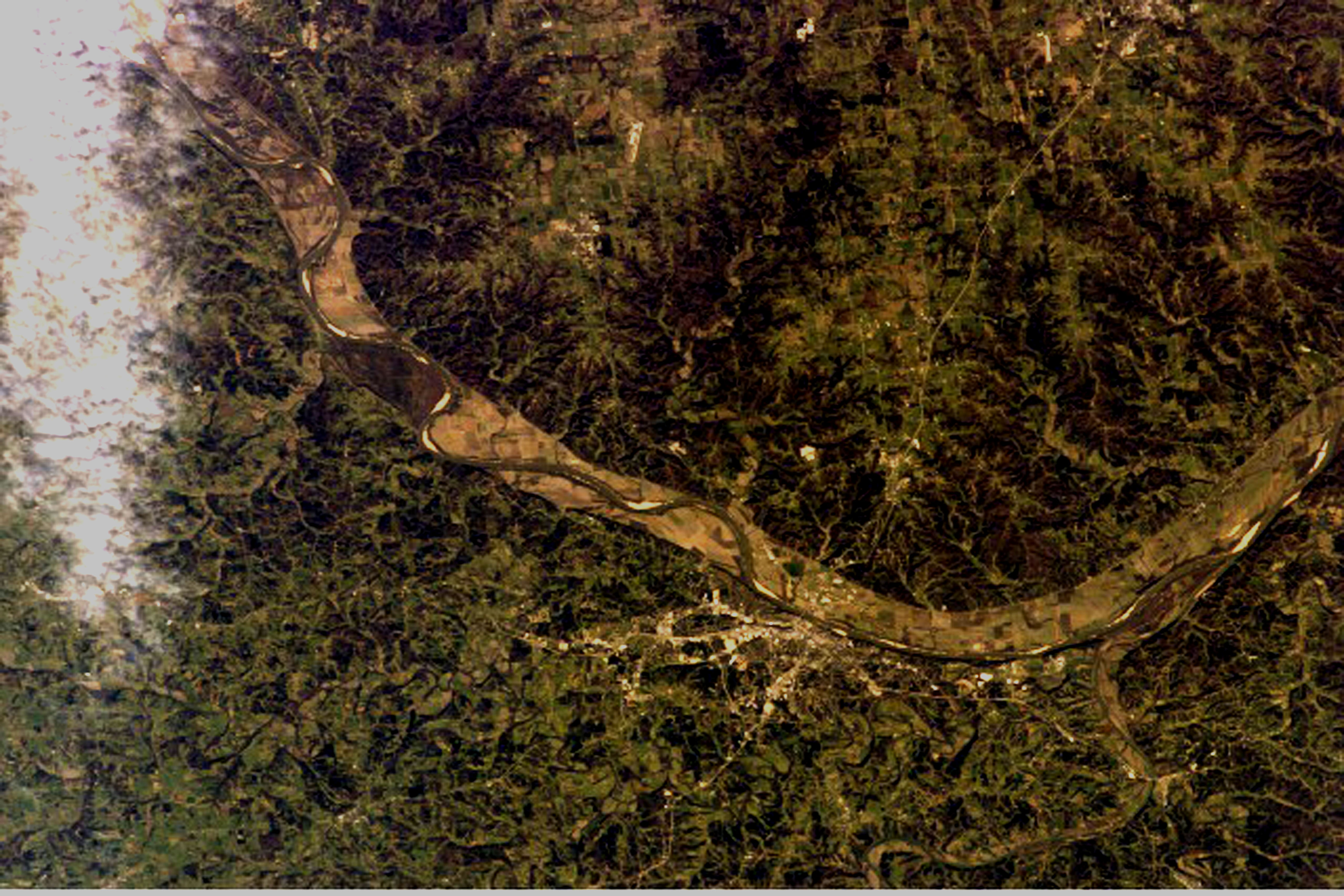
A photograph of Jefferson City and its geography from the International Space Station

=== Transportation ===
==== Highways ====
Federal highways are U.S. Routes 50, 54, and 63. Missouri Routes 179 and 94 also run through the city. Jefferson City is one of the four state capitals that is not served by an Interstate highway. The others are Dover, Delaware; Juneau, Alaska; and Pierre, South Dakota. Interstate 70 passes by the city 30 miles (48 km) to the north in Columbia.

==== Airports ====
The city is served by Columbia Regional Airport and nearby Jefferson City Memorial Airport.

==== Public transportation ====
===== Local transit =====
JeffTran, the city operated public transit system, provides year-round bus service during traditional weekday business hours, but is currently considering the extension of service hours to include evenings and weekends.

===== Intercity transit =====
The Jefferson City station, located in the former Union Hotel at Jefferson Landing State Historic Site, is one of the Missouri River Runner train stops between Kansas City and St. Louis, provided by Amtrak.

A Greyhound bus stop near the Eastland Drive Convenient Food Mart also provides intercity transit. Jefferson City Memorial Airport, which is located in the Jefferson City limits of Callaway County, Missouri, serves general aviation but has no scheduled commercial airline service.

=== Healthcare ===
Jefferson City is home to SSM Health St. Mary's Hospital, which has 154 beds. Capital Region Medical Center, an affiliate of University of Missouri Health Care, is located in the city.

== Sister city ==
Jefferson City is the sister city to the German city of Münchberg. Around 200 years ago, settlers from Münchberg founded a neighborhood south of downtown Jefferson City, which is still known as "Old Munichburg".

== See also ==
- Columbia – a city in Missouri near Jefferson City
- Capital Mall – a mall in Jefferson City
- Cathedral of St. Joseph – a cathedral in Jefferson City
