= JeffTran =

Public transit company

- Parent: City of Jefferson
- Founded: 1974
- Headquarters: Operational: Charles E. Robinson station 820 E. Miller St. City Hall: John G. Christy Municipal Building; 320 E. McCarty St.
- Locale: Jefferson City, Missouri
- Service type: bus service, paratransit
- Routes: 6
- Hubs: 2
- Fleet: 22 total buses (12 full sized buses, 10 paratransit buses)
- Annual ridership: 299,408 (2016)
- Division Director: Mark Mehmert
- Website: JeffTran

JeffTran is a public transit agency in Jefferson City, Missouri.

It operates six regular fixed bus routes with two transport hubs and on call curb to curb paratransit service during typical weekday business hours. During the school year, JeffTran also provides three afternoon specialty tripper routes for all passengers, but is intended to take high school students on a direct route from a school to a transport hub.

In 2016, JeffTran provided service to 299,408 riders, down from 313,750 riders in 2015.

Live bus tracking is also available through DoubleMap's website and their Android and Apple apps for passengers' convenience.

== Fares ==
Fares are valid as of September 9, 2018.

=== One way fares ===
Regular fixed route: $1

=== Other passes ===
Adult passes: $20 for 20 rides
Student passes: $18 for 20 rides

=== Free and reduced fares ===
Children under six years of age ride free while pre-approved seniors and disabled persons are eligible for half-fare rides.

=== Transfer fares ===
Transfers are free and are given to the customer upon request to the driver for use at the transport hub.

=== Paratransit fares ===
In addition, paratransit service may be provided for persons with limited mobility who call one day in advance and pay a $2.00 one way fare.

== Routes ==
Name	Type	Notes
Red Route/Business 50 East	regular	weekdays only
Black Route/Capital Mall	regular	weekdays only
Gold Route/High Street West	regular	weekdays only
Green Route/High Street East	regular	weekdays only
Orange Route/Missouri Blvd	regular	weekdays only
Blue Route/Southwest	regular	weekdays only
High Street East Tripper	express	school day afternoons only
Hutton Lane Tripper	express	school day afternoons only
Southside / Tanner Bridge Tripper	express	school day afternoons only

== Transport hubs ==
JeffTran has two transport hubs, which are also locally known as transfer stations. The main transport hub is at JeffTran's operational headquarters and serves all routes except Capital Mall. A secondary transport hub is the standalone bus shelter area at the north end of Stonecreek Drive, which is near the parking lot of the Stadium Boulevard Walmart. This second transport hub only serves the Capital Mall and Missouri Blvd routes.

This partially decentralized setup means, for example, a person located west of this Walmart who wants to ride Business 50 East, High Street West, High Street East, or Southwest must get on the Capital Mall bus, transfer to the Missouri Blvd bus at the secondary transport hub, and then transfer again at the main transport hub to one of the other listed buses. It also means that anybody riding these routes who want to transfer to the Capital Mall bus have to get on the Missouri Blvd bus at the main transport hub and then transfer to the Capital Mall bus at the secondary transport hub.

== See also ==
- List of intercity bus stops in Missouri
