= KAGE (AM) =

Radio station in Van Buren–Fort Smith, Arkansas

- Van Buren, Arkansas; United States
- Broadcast area: Fort Smith, Arkansas
- Frequency: 1580 kHz
- Branding: Red Dirt 106.7

Programming
- Format: Red Dirt country

Ownership
- Owner: Darren Girdner; (G2 Media Group LLC)

History
- First air date: November 24, 1958 (as KFDF)
- Former call signs: KFDF (1958–2001); KHGG (2001–2021)

Technical information
- Licensing authority: FCC
- Facility ID: 52427
- Class: D
- Power: 1,000 watts (day); 49 watts (night)
- Transmitter coordinates: 35°23′30″N 94°19′54″W
- Translators: 101.1 K266BS (Van Buren); 106.7 K294DM (Fort Smith)

Links
- Public license information: Public file; LMS
- Webcast: Listen Live
- Website: www.reddirt1067.com

KAGE (1580 AM) is a radio station licensed to Van Buren, Arkansas, United States, and serving the Fort Smith area. The station is currently owned by Darren Girdner, through licensee G2 Media Group LLC.

== History ==
In October 2017, the then-KHGG switched its FM simulcast from KHGG-FM 103.1 Waldron (which went silent) to FM translator K266BS 101.1 FM Van Buren.

The call letters changed to KAGE on January 1, 2021, after Pharis Broadcasting, Inc. sold KHGG—but not the translator it was using—to Darren Girdner's G2 Media Group, after having upgraded KHGG-FM and changing its frequency to 103.5 MHz.

On May 24, 2021, KAGE changed their format from sports to Texas/Red Dirt country, branded as "Red Dirt 96.7" (the 96.7 in branding is for translator K244FJ 96.7 FM Fort Smith).
