= KWOS =

Jefferson City, Missouri; United States
- Broadcast area: Mid-Missouri
- Frequency: 950 kHz
- Branding: News Radio KWOS 950 AM 104.5 FM

Programming
- Format: News–talk
- Affiliations: Fox News Radio; Compass Media Networks; Genesis Communications Network; Premiere Networks; USA Radio Network; Westwood One; KMIZ-TV

Ownership
- Owner: Zimmer Radio; (Zimmer Radio of Mid-Missouri, Inc)
- Sister stations: KATI

History
- First air date: 1954 (as KLIK)
- Former call signs: KLIK (1954–1999)
- Call sign meaning: Keep Watching Our State

Technical information
- Licensing authority: FCC
- Facility ID: 9927
- Class: B
- Power: 5,000 watts day; 500 watts night
- Transmitter coordinates: 38°31′13.12″N 92°10′42.66″W
- Translator: 104.5 K283CL (Jefferson City)

Links
- Public license information: Public file; LMS
- Webcast: Listen live
- Website: kwos.com

KWOS (950 AM) is a radio station broadcasting a conservative talk format. Licensed to Jefferson City, Missouri, United States, the station serves the Mid-Missouri area. The station is owned by Zimmer Radio of Mid-Missouri, Inc and features programming from Fox News Radio, Compass Media Networks, Genesis Communications Network, Premiere Networks, USA Radio Network, and Westwood One.

== History ==
KWOS debuted, as KLIK in 1954. In 1999, the station swapped call letters with an existing station on AM 1240, becoming KWOS.

The KWOS call sign referenced an earlier Jefferson City radio station, WOS, that was set up by Missouri Agriculture Commissioner Jewell A. Mayes to facilitate agricultural commerce. WOS was first licensed on February 23, 1922, and was deleted on March 27, 1936. The original KWOS (1240 AM) was established in 1937, operating with 250 watts and featuring programming from Mutual Broadcasting System. From the 1950s until the mid-1970s, KWOS carried a Top 40 music format. KWOS also formerly carried St. Louis Cardinals baseball games for 68 years from 1938 until 2006.

Former logo before translator change

== Programming ==
Weekday syndicated programming on KWOS includes The Sean Hannity Show, The Glenn Beck Program, Gary Nolan, Coast to Coast AM, The Clay Travis and Buck Sexton Show, Gordon Deal, and Mark Levin. Unlike most news/talk stations in the United States, KWOS is one of several news/talk stations in the United States that does not primarily air brokered paid or religious programming on weekends. The station previously aired local religious programming on Sunday mornings until it was removed in 2023. Syndicated programming on both Saturdays and Sundays include Gordon Deal, Bret Baier, Dave Ramsey, Tom Shillue, Bill Cunningham, and Kim Komando (the only brokered program on KWOS). Local sports programming was also aired on Saturday mornings, as well as simulcasts of Fox News Sunday on Sunday mornings. The station was formerly a longtime affiliate of The Rush Limbaugh Show.
