= KTGR-FM =

- Fulton, Missouri; United States
- Broadcast area: Columbia, Missouri
- Frequency: 100.5 MHz
- Branding: KTGR

Programming
- Format: Sports
- Affiliations: ESPN Radio; Mizzou Sports Properties; St. Louis Cardinals Radio Network

Ownership
- Owner: Zimmer Radio Group; (Zimmer Radio of Mid-Missouri, Inc)

History
- First air date: 1970 (as KKCA at 97.7)
- Former call signs: KKCA (1970–2010)
- Former frequencies: 97.7 MHz (1970–1990)
- Call sign meaning: K TiGeR

Technical information
- Licensing authority: FCC
- Facility ID: 34408
- Class: A
- ERP: 6,000 watts
- HAAT: 91 meters (299 ft)
- Transmitter coordinates: 38°51′58.00″N 91°57′15.00″W

Links
- Public license information: Public file; LMS
- Webcast: Listen Live
- Website: ktgr.com

KTGR-FM (100.5 FM) is a radio station broadcasting a sports format known as "KTGR 100.5". KTGR-FM is licensed to Fulton, Missouri and serves the eastern sections of the Columbia, Missouri market. The station is currently owned by Zimmer Radio, and features local St. Louis Cardinals baseball coverage and programming from ESPN Radio. In its early history, KTGR-FM was KKCA 97.7 FM transmitting with 3,000 watts from Fulton, Missouri and featuring a mixed format of Top 40, pop, rock and adult contemporary music for its first 25 years or so, including everyone's favorite "Tradio", Fulton Hornets High School Play by Play, ABC radio news and St. Louis Cardinals Baseball. Early 1980's radio hosts included Tom Harris, Dan Baetty, Jeff Johnson, and others. Eventually KKCA relocated to 100.5 FM for a power upgrade to 6,000 watts and changed its on air programming to an automated oldies format before beginning the all sports format when the call letters were changed to KTGR-FM, with a feed of the sports programming from a low power AM station, KTGR-AM 1580 in Columbia.
