= KATI =

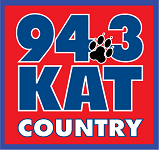
- California, Missouri; United States
- Broadcast area: Jefferson City, Missouri
- Frequency: 94.3 MHz
- Branding: 94.3 KAT Country

Programming
- Format: Country music

Ownership
- Owner: Zimmer Radio; (Zimmer Radio of Mid-Missouri, Inc.)
- Sister stations: KWOS

History
- First air date: May 18, 1982
- Former call signs: KZMO-FM (1982–1995)

Technical information
- Licensing authority: FCC
- Facility ID: 67379
- Class: C2
- ERP: 50,000 watts
- HAAT: 150 meters (490 ft)
- Transmitter coordinates: 38°31′25″N 92°24′25″W
- Translator: 101.1 K266CA (Jefferson City)

Links
- Public license information: Public file; LMS
- Website: www.943kat.com

KATI (94.3 FM), branded as 94.3 KAT Country, is a radio station which broadcasts country music and St. Louis Cardinals baseball. Licensed to California, Missouri, the station serves the Jefferson City area and is owned by the Zimmer Radio Group of Mid-Missouri.
