= List of radio stations in Missouri =

The following is a list of FCC-licensed radio stations in the U.S. state of Missouri, which can be sorted by their call signs, frequencies, cities of license, licensees, and programming formats.

== List of radio stations ==
Call sign	Frequency	City of License	Licensee	Format
KAAN	870 AM	Bethany	Alpha Media Licensee LLC	Sports (ESPN/ISN)
KAAN-FM	95.5 FM	Bethany	Alpha Media Licensee LLC	Country
KADI-FM	99.5 FM	Republic	Vision Communications Inc.	Contemporary Christian
KAHR	96.7 FM	Poplar Bluff	Eagle Bluff Enterprises	Adult hits
KALM	1290 AM	Thayer	E-Communications LLC	Gospel
KAPE	1550 AM	Cape Girardeau	Withers Broadcasting Company of Missouri LLC	News/Talk/Sports
KATI	94.3 FM	California	Zimmer Radio of Mid-Missouri, Inc.	Country
KATZ	1600 AM	St. Louis	iHM Licenses, LLC	Urban contemporary gospel
KATZ-FM	100.3 FM	Bridgeton	iHM Licenses, LLC	Mainstream urban
KAUD	90.5 FM	Mexico	The Curators of the University of Missouri	Public radio
KAUF	89.9 FM	Kennett	American Family Association	Religious Talk (AFR)
KAYQ	97.1 FM	Warsaw	Valkyrie Broadcasting, Inc.	Classic country
KAYX	92.5 FM	Richmond	Bott Communications, Inc.	Religious Talk (Bott Radio Network)
KBAI	91.5 FM	Bloomfield	Educational Media Foundation	Worship music (Air1)
KBBM	100.1 FM	Jefferson City	Cumulus Licensing LLC	Country
KBCV	1570 AM	Hollister	Bott Communications, Inc.	Religious Talk (Bott Radio Network)
KBDZ	93.1 FM	Perryville	Donze Communications, Inc.	Classic rock
KBEQ-FM	104.3 FM	Kansas City	MGTF Media Company, LLC	Country
KBFL	1060 AM	Springfield	Zimmer Midwest Communications, Inc.	Sports (ESPN)
KBGM	91.1 FM	Park Hills	American Family Association	Religious Talk (AFR)
KBHI	107.1 FM	Miner	Withers Broadcasting Company of Southeast Missouri, LLC	Active rock
KBIA	91.3 FM	Columbia	The Curators of the University of Missouri	Public radio
KBKC	90.1 FM	Moberly	Covenant Network	Catholic
KBMC-LP	104.5 FM	Macks Creek	Branch Memorial Seventh-Day Adventist Church	Religious Teaching
KBMV-FM	107.1 FM	Birch Tree	E-Communications, LLC	Contemporary Christian (K-Love)
KBNN	750 AM	Lebanon	Alpha Media Licensee LLC	News/Talk
KBOA	1540 AM	Kennett	Pollack Broadcasting Co.	Adult standards/MOR
KBOB	1550 AM	Springfield	One Media, Inc.	Adult hits
KBOD	99.7 FM	Gainesville	Mountain Lakes Broadcasting Corp.	Country
KBTC	1250 AM	Houston	Media Professional, LLC	Religious Talk (AFR)
KBTN	1420 AM	Neosho	American Media Investments Inc.	Sports (FSR)
KBTN-FM	99.7 FM	Neosho	American Media Investments Inc.	Classic country
KBXB	97.9 FM	Sikeston	Withers Broadcasting Company of Southeast Missouri, LLC	Classic country
KBXR	102.3 FM	Columbia	Cumulus Licensing LLC	Adult album alternative
KCAH-LP	96.3 FM	Carthage	Iglesia Cristiana Hispano-Americana	Spanish religious
KCAX	1220 AM	Branson	Ozark Mountain Media Group, LLC	Classic hits
KCBW	104.5 FM	Grandin	Fox Radio Network, LLC	Classic rock
KCFV	89.5 FM	Ferguson	St. Louis Community College	College radio
KCFX	101.1 FM	Harrisonville	CMP Houston-KC, LLC	Classic rock
KCGK	104.1 FM	Lutesville	Pure Word Broadcasting, LLC	Christian country
KCGQ-FM	99.3 FM	Gordonville	MRR License, LLC	Active rock
KCGR	90.5 FM	Oran	Community Broadcasting, Inc.	Religious Talk (Bott Radio Network)
KCHI	1010 AM	Chillicothe	Leatherman Communications, Inc.	Adult contemporary
KCHI-FM	102.5 FM	Chillicothe	Leatherman Communications, Inc.	Adult contemporary
KCJK	105.1 FM	Garden City	CMP Houston-KC, LLC	Top 40 (CHR)
KCKC	102.1 FM	Kansas City	MGTF Media Company, LLC	Adult hits
KCKE	90.3 FM	Chillicothe	University of Northwestern – St. Paul	Christian adult contemporary (Spirit FM)
KCKF	91.9 FM	Cuba	University of Northwestern – St. Paul	Christian adult contemporary (Spirit FM)
KCKH	95.9 FM	Mansfield	University of Northwestern – St. Paul	Christian adult contemporary
KCKJ	89.5 FM	Sarcoxie	Radio Training Network, Inc.	Contemporary Christian
KCKP	100.9 FM	Laurie	University of Northwestern – St. Paul	Christian talk and teaching
KCKV	91.9 FM	Kirksville	University of Northwestern – St. Paul	Christian talk and teaching
KCKZ	103.5 FM	Huntsville	University of Northwestern – St. Paul	Christian adult contemporary (Spirit FM)
KCLC	89.1 FM	St. Charles	Lindenwood University	Adult album alternative
KCLQ	107.9 FM	Lebanon	Go Productions LLC	Country
KCLR-FM	99.3 FM	Boonville	Zimmer Radio of Mid-Missouri, Inc.	Country
KCMO	710 AM	Kansas City	CMP Houston-KC, LLC	Talk
KCMQ	96.7 FM	Columbia	Zimmer Radio of Mid-Missouri, Inc.	Classic rock
KCNF-LP	104.1 FM	Macon	Macon Seventh-Day Adventist Church	Religious Teaching
KCOU	88.1 FM	Columbia	The Curators of the University of Missouri	College radio
KCOZ	91.7 FM	Point Lookout	College of the Ozarks	Jazz
KCPZ-LP	95.3 FM	Kansas City	Concrete Truth Community Network	Urban gospel
KCRL	90.3 FM	Sunrise Beach	Community Broadcasting Inc.	Religious Talk (Bott Radio Network)
KCRV	1370 AM	Caruthersville	Pollack Broadcasting Co.	Classic country
KCRV-FM	105.1 FM	Caruthersville	Pollack Broadcasting Co.	Classic hits
KCTE	1510 AM	Independence	Union Broadcasting	Talk/Sports (ESPN/CBS)
KCTO	1160 AM	Cleveland	Alpine Broadcasting	Talk/Music
KCUR-FM	89.3 FM	Kansas City	The Curators of the University of Missouri	Public radio (NPR)
KCVJ	100.3 FM	Osceola	University of Northwestern – St. Paul	Christian adult contemporary (Spirit FM)
KCVK	107.7 FM	Otterville	University of Northwestern – St. Paul	Christian adult contemporary (Spirit FM)
KCVO-FM	91.7 FM	Camdenton	University of Northwestern – St. Paul	Christian adult contemporary (Spirit FM)
KCVQ	89.7 FM	Knob Noster	University of Northwestern – St. Paul	Christian adult contemporary (Spirit FM)
KCVX	91.7 FM	Salem	University of Northwestern – St. Paul	Christian adult contemporary (Spirit FM)
KCVY	89.9 FM	Cabool	University of Northwestern – St. Paul	Christian adult contemporary (Spirit FM)
KCVZ	92.1 FM	Dixon	University of Northwestern – St. Paul	Christian adult contemporary (Spirit FM)
KCWJ	1030 AM	Blue Springs	Radio Vida Kansas, Inc.	Spanish religious
KCXL	1140 AM	Liberty	Alpine Broadcasting	Talk/Music
KCXM-LP	95.1 FM	Kimberling City	Kimberling City Adventist Radio	Christian
KDAA	103.1 FM	Rolla	KTTR-KZNN, Inc.	Adult hits
KDBB	104.3 FM	Bonne Terre	Odle Media Group, LLC	Classic hits
KDEX	1590 AM	Dexter	KDEX Inc	Country
KDEX-FM	102.3 FM	Dexter	KDEX Inc	Country
KDHX	1010 AM	St. Louis	East Central Broadcasting, LLC	Conservative talk
KDJR	100.1 FM	De Soto	Family Worship Center Church, Inc.	Religious
KDKD-FM	95.3 FM	Clinton	Radford Media Group, LLC	Country
KDMC-FM	88.7 FM	Van Buren	Board of Regents, Southeast Missouri State University	Public radio
KDMO	1490 AM	Carthage	Carthage Broadcasting Company, Inc.	Nostalgia
KDMR	1190 AM	Kansas City	Catholic Radio Network, Inc.	Catholic
KDRO	1490 AM	Sedalia	Benne Broadcasting of Sedalia, LLC	News/Talk
KDRU-LP	98.1 FM	Springfield	Drury University	Variety
KDVC	98.3 FM	Columbia	Iris Media, LLC	Adult contemporary
KDWD	99.1 FM	Marceline	Main Street USA Communications, LLC	Country
KEFL	91.5 FM	Kirksville	Covenant Network	Catholic
KESJ	1550 AM	St. Joseph	Eagle Broadcasting	Classic hits
KESM-FM	105.5 FM	El Dorado Springs	Wildwood Communications, Inc.	Country
KEXS	1090 AM	Excelsior Springs	Catholic Radio Network	Catholic
KEXS-FM	106.1 FM	Ravenwood	Catholic Radio Network, Inc.	Catholic
KEYK	89.3 FM	Osage Beach	Orion Center, Inc	Oldies
KEZK-FM	102.5 FM	St. Louis	Audacy License, LLC	Adult contemporary
KEZS-FM	102.9 FM	Cape Girardeau	MRR License LLC	Country
KFAL	900 AM	Fulton	Zimmer Radio of Mid-Missouri, Inc.	Country
KFAV	99.9 FM	Warrenton	Kaspar Broadcasting Co. of Missouri	Country
KFBD-FM	97.9 FM	Waynesville	Alpha Media Licensee LLC	Adult contemporary
KFCV	90.5 FM	Dixon	Community Broadcasting, Inc.	Religious Talk (Bott Radio Network)
KFDS-FM	92.5 FM	Mountain Grove	Dockins Communications, Inc	Country
KFEB	107.5 FM	Campbell	Eagle Bluff Enterprises	Top 40 (CHR)
KFEQ	680 AM	St. Joseph	Eagle Communications, Inc.	News/Talk/Sports
KFLW	98.9 FM	St. Robert	Benne Broadcasting of the Ozarks, LLC	Hot adult contemporary
KFMO	1240 AM	Flat River	Odle Media Group, LLC	News/Talk/Sports
KFMZ	1470 AM	Brookfield	Best Broadcast Group	Hot adult contemporary
KFNS-FM	100.7 FM	Troy	Viper Broadcasting, LLC	Mainstream rock
KFNZ	610 AM	Kansas City	Audacy License, LLC	Sports (FSR)
KFNZ-FM	96.5 FM	Kansas City	Audacy License, LLC	Sports (FSR)
KFOH-LP	99.3 FM	Saint Joseph	St. Joseph Music Foundation	Variety
KFRU	1400 AM	Columbia	Cumulus Licensing LLC	News/Talk
KFSS-LP	94.5 FM	Joplin	Diocese of Springfield-Cape Girardeau dba St. Peter Apostle	Catholic
KFTK-FM	97.1 FM	Florissant	Audacy License, LLC	News/Talk
KFTN-LP	92.7 FM	Fenton	Rockwood School District	Classic rock
KFUO	850 AM	Clayton	Lutheran Church-Missouri Synod	Christian
KGBX-FM	105.9 FM	Nixa	iHM Licenses, LLC	Adult contemporary
KGIR	1220 AM	Cape Girardeau	MRR License LLC	Sports (ESPN)
KGKS	93.9 FM	Scott City	MRR License LLC	Adult hits
KGMO	100.7 FM	Cape Girardeau	Withers Broadcasting Company of Missouri, LLC	Classic rock
KGMY	1400 AM	Springfield	iHM Licenses, LLC	Sports (FSR)
KGNA-FM	89.9 FM	Arnold	Missouri River Christian Broadcasting, Inc.	Christian (The Good News Voice)
KGNV	89.9 FM	Washington	Missouri River Christian Broadcasting, Inc.	Christian (The Good News Voice)
KGNX	89.7 FM	Ballwin	Missouri River Christian Broadcasting, Inc.	Christian (The Good News Voice)
KGOZ	101.7 FM	Gallatin	Par Broadcasting Co., Inc.	Country
KGRC	92.9 FM	Hannibal	Staradio Corp.	Top 40 (CHR)
KGSP	90.5 FM	Parkville	Board of Trustees, Park University	Alternative
KHBL-LP	96.9 FM	Hannibal	KHBL	Community radio/Variety
KHCI-LP	104.1 FM	Moberly	Moberly Seventh-Day Adventist Church	Religious Teaching
KHCR	99.5 FM	Bismarck	Light Communications, LLC	Contemporary Christian
KHEZ-LP	107.9 FM	Cape Girardeau	Flat Foot Media, Inc.	Christian Adult Contemporary
KHIS	89.9 FM	Jackson	Pure Word Communications	Christian Adult Contemporary
KHJM	89.1 FM	Dexter	Covenant Network	Catholic
KHJR	88.1 FM	St. Thomas	Covenant Network	Catholic
KHMO	1070 AM	Hannibal	Townsquare License, LLC	News/Talk
KHOJ	1460 AM	St. Charles	Covenant Network	Catholic
KHST	101.7 FM	Lamar	Land Go Radio Group LLC	Sports
KICK	1340 AM	Springfield	Vision Communications Inc.	News/Talk
KICK-FM	97.9 FM	Palmyra	Townsquare License, LLC	Country
KIGL	93.3 FM	Seligman	iHM Licenses, LLC	Classic rock
KIIK	1270 AM	Waynesville	Alpha Media Licensee LLC	Talk
KIRK	99.9 FM	Macon	Alpha Media Licensee LLC	Classic hits
KIRS	107.7 FM	Stockton	VCY America, Inc.	Conservative Christian
KIRX	1450 AM	Kirksville	KIRX, Incorporated	News/Talk, Oldies
KIXQ	102.5 FM	Joplin	Zimmer Radio, Inc.	Country
KJAB-FM	88.3 FM	Mexico	Mexico Educational Broadcasting Foundation	Southern gospel
KJCV-FM	89.7 FM	Country Club	Community Broadcasting, Inc.	Religious Talk (Bott Radio Network)
KJCW	1100 AM	Webb City	Catholic Radio Network, Inc.	Religious (Here's Help Network)
KJEL	103.7 FM	Lebanon	Alpha Media Licensee LLC	Country
KJEZ	95.5 FM	Poplar Bluff	MRR License LLC	Classic rock
KJFF	1400 AM	Festus	Alpha Media Licensee LLC	Talk
KJFM	102.1 FM	Louisiana	Foxfire Communications, Inc.	Country
KJIR	91.7 FM	Hannibal	Believers Broadcasting Corporation	Southern gospel
KJLU	88.9 FM	Jefferson City	Lincoln University of Missouri	Smooth jazz
KJMK	93.9 FM	Webb City	Zimmer Radio, Inc.	Classic hits
KJMO	97.5 FM	Linn	Cumulus Licensing LLC	Silent
KJNW	88.5 FM	Kansas City	Northwestern College	Contemporary Christian
KJPW	1390 AM	Waynesville	Carter Media LLC	News/Talk
KJTR-LP	101.7 FM	Rolla	Rolla Chinese Christian Association	Christian Chinese
KJXX	1170 AM	Jackson	Withers Broadcasting Company of Missouri, LLC	Rhythmic hot adult contemporary
KKBL	95.9 FM	Monett	Eagle Broadcasting, Inc.	Adult hits
KKDY	102.5 FM	West Plains	Better Newspapers, Inc.	Country
KKFI	90.1 FM	Kansas City	Mid-Coast Radio Project, Inc.	Community radio/Variety
KKID	92.9 FM	Salem	Steven K. Wheeler and Jill E. Wheeler	Classic rock
KKJO-FM	105.5 FM	St. Joseph	Eagle Broadcasting	Top 40 (CHR)
KKLH	104.7 FM	Marshfield	MW Springmo, Inc.	Classic rock
KKLR-FM	94.5 FM	Poplar Bluff	MRR License LLC	Country
KKOZ	1430 AM	Ava	Corum Industries, Inc.	Country
KKOZ-FM	92.1 FM	Ava	Corum Industries, Inc.	Country
KKTR	89.7 FM	Kirksville	Truman State University	Public radio
KKWK	100.1 FM	Cameron	Alpha Media Licensee LLC	Classic rock
KLEX	1570 AM	Lexington	Bott Communications, Inc.	Religious Talk (Bott Radio Network)
KLFC	88.1 FM	Branson	Mountaintop Broadcasting, Inc.	Christian contemporary
KLHW-LP	90.5 FM	Kansas City	Multicultural Professional Counseling Services	
KLID	1340 AM	Poplar Bluff	Browning Skidmore Broadcasting, Inc.	Oldies/News/Talk
KLIK	1240 AM	Jefferson City	Cumulus Licensing LLC	Talk
KLJE-LP	107.5 FM	Columbia	Columbia Chinese Christian Church	Christian Chinese
KLJT	88.1 FM	St. Louis	Gateway Creative Broadcasting, Inc.	Worship music
KLJY	99.1 FM	Clayton	Gateway Creative Broadcasting, Inc.	Contemporary Christian
KLMZ	107.1 FM	Leadwood	Dockins Communications, Inc.	Classic rock
KLOU	103.3 FM	St. Louis	iHM Licenses, LLC	Classic hits
KLOZ	92.7 FM	Eldon	Benne Broadcasting Company, LLC	Hot adult contemporary
KLPW	1220 AM	Union	Broadcast Properties, Inc.	Americana
KLRQ	96.1 FM	Clinton	Educational Media Foundation	Contemporary Christian (K-Love)
KLRX	97.3 FM	Lee's Summit	Educational Media Foundation	Contemporary Christian (K-Love)
KLSC	92.9 FM	Malden	MRR License LLC	Top 40 (CHR)
KLTE	107.9 FM	Kirksville	Bott Communications	Religious Talk (Bott Radio Network)
KLTI	1560 AM	Macon	Chirillo Electronics, Inc.	Country
KLUE	103.5 FM	Poplar Bluff	Benjamin Stratemeyer	Top 40 (CHR)
KLUH	90.3 FM	Poplar Bluff	David Craig Ministries, Inc.	Contemporary Christian
KLWL	88.1 FM	Chillicothe	CSN International	Religious Talk (CSN International)
KMAL	1470 AM	Malden	MRR License LLC	Sports (ESPN)
KMBZ	980 AM	Kansas City	Audacy License, LLC	Talk
KMCR	103.9 FM	Montgomery City	Chirillo Electronics, Inc.	Adult contemporary
KMCV	89.9 FM	High Point	Community Broadcasting, Inc.	Religious Talk (Bott Radio Network)
KMEM-FM	100.5 FM	Memphis	Tri-Rivers Broadcasting Company	Country
KMFC	92.1 FM	Centralia	Educational Media Foundation	Contemporary Christian (K-Love)
KMIS	1050 AM	Portageville	Pollack Broadcasting Co.	Sports (FSR)
KMIS-FM	103.9 FM	Gideon	Pollack Broadcasting Co.	Sports (FSR)
KMJK	107.3 FM	North Kansas City	CMP Houston-KC, LLC	Adult hits
KMMO	1300 AM	Marshall	Missouri Valley Broadcasting, Inc.	Country
KMMO-FM	102.9 FM	Marshall	Missouri Valley Broadcasting, Inc.	Country
KMNR	89.7 FM	Rolla	The Curators of the University of Missouri	Freeform
KMOE	92.1 FM	Butler	Bates County Broadcasting Company	Country
KMOX	1120 AM	St. Louis	Audacy License, LLC	News/Talk
KMOX-FM	104.1 FM	Hazelwood	Audacy License, LLC	News/Talk
KMOZ	1590 AM	Rolla	Community Broadcasting, Inc.	Religious Talk (Bott Radio Network)
KMRF	1510 AM	Marshfield	New Life Evangelistic Center, Inc.	Religious (Here's Help Network)
KMRN	1360 AM	Cameron	Alpha Media Licensee LLC	Classic country
KMST	88.5 FM	Rolla	The Curators of the University of Missouri	Public radio
KMUC	90.5 FM	Columbia	The Curators of the University of Missouri	Classical
KMVC	91.7 FM	Marshall	Missouri Valley College	College radio
KMVG	890 AM	Gladstone	Catholic Radio Network, Inc.	Catholic
KMWC	89.9 FM	Bethany	Penfold Communications, Inc.	Christian CHR
KMXL	95.1 FM	Carthage	Carthage Broadcasting Company, Inc.	Adult hits
KMXV	93.3 FM	Kansas City	MGTF Media Company, LLC	Top 40 (CHR)
KMZU	100.7 FM	Carrollton	Carter Media LLC	Country
KNBS	94.1 FM	Bowling Green	Epic STL, LLC	Conservative talk
KNEM	1240 AM	Nevada	Harbit Communications, Inc.	Adult contemporary
KNEO	91.7 FM	Neosho	Sky High Broadcasting Corporation	Contemporary Christian
KNIM	1580 AM	Maryville	Regional Media, Inc.	Country
KNLG	90.3 FM	New Bloomfield	New Life Evangelistic Center, Inc.	Religious (Here's Help Network)
KNLH	89.5 FM	Cedar Hill	New Life Evangelistic Center, Inc.	Religious (Here's Help Network)
KNLN	90.9 FM	Vienna	New Life Evangelistic Center, Inc.	Religious (Here's Help Network)
KNLP	89.7 FM	Potosi	New Life Evangelistic Center, Inc.	Religious (Here's Help Network)
KNMO-FM	97.5 FM	Nevada	Harbit Communications, Inc.	Country
KOBC	90.7 FM	Joplin	Educational Media Foundation	Contemporary Christian (K-Love)
KOEA	97.5 FM	Doniphan	Eagle Bluff Enterprises	Country
KOJH-LP	104.7 FM	Kansas City	Mutual Musicians Foundation, Inc.	R&B/Jazz/Russian propaganda (Radio Sputnik)
KOKO	1450 AM	Warrensburg	D & H Media, L.L.C.	Oldies
KOKS	89.5 FM	Poplar Bluff	Calvary Educational Broadcasting Network	Contemporary Christian
KOMC-FM	100.1 FM	Kimberling City	Ozark Mountain Media Group, LLC	Adult contemporary
KOMG	105.1 FM	Willard	MW Springmo, Inc.	Country
KONN-LP	100.1 FM	Kansas City	The International Radio Project of Kansas City	Variety
KOPN	89.5 FM	Columbia	New Wave Corporation	Variety
KOQL	106.1 FM	Ashland	Cumulus Licensing LLC	Top 40 (CHR)
KOSP	92.9 FM	Ozark	MW Springmo, Inc.	Rhythmic contemporary
KOTC-LP	98.7 FM	Jefferson City	Jefferson City Seventh-Day Adventist Church	Christian
KOZO	89.7 FM	Branson	Daniel Ingles Ministries Church Inc.	Religious
KOZQ-FM	102.3 FM	Waynesville	Alpha Media Licensee LLC	Classic rock
KOZX	98.1 FM	Cabool	Dockins Communications, Inc	Classic rock
KPBM-LP	101.9 FM	Poplar Bluff	Black River Public Radio	Variety
KPBR	91.7 FM	Poplar Bluff	Community Broadcasting, Inc.	Religious Talk (Bott Radio Network)
KPGZ-LP	102.7 FM	Kearney	Corporation for Educational Opportunities for Northeast Clay	Classic rock
KPIP-LP	94.7 FM	Fayette	International Educational Resources for Rural Missouri	Variety
KPLA	101.5 FM	Columbia	Cumulus Licensing LLC	Adult contemporary
KPOW-FM	97.7 FM	La Monte	Benne Broadcasting of Sedalia, LLC	Classic hits
KPPL	92.5 FM	Poplar Bluff	George S. Flinn, Jr.	Country
KPPZ-LP	100.5 FM	Kansas City	Concrete Truth Learning Institute	Spanish religious
KPRS	103.3 FM	Kansas City	Carter Broadcast Group	Urban contemporary
KPRT	1590 AM	Kansas City	Carter Broadcast Group	Urban contemporary gospel
KPWB	1140 AM	Piedmont	Dockins Broadcast Group, LLC	Country
KPWB-FM	104.9 FM	Piedmont	Dockins Broadcast Group, LLC	Country
KQBS	97.7 FM	Potosi	Gateway Creative Broadcasting, Inc.	Contemporary Christian
KQDZ	101.7 FM	Elsberry	East Central Broadcasting, LLC	Classic hits
KQJN-LP	99.1 FM	Doniphan	Current River Community Radio Foundation	Variety
KQMO	97.7 FM	Shell Knob	Falcon Broadcasting, Inc.	Regional Mexican
KQOH	91.9 FM	Marshfield	Catholic Radio Network, Inc.	Catholic
KQRA	102.1 FM	Brookline	MW Springmo, Inc.	Active rock
KQUL	102.7 FM	Lake Ozark	Benne Broadcasting Co. of Lake Ozark, Inc.	Classic hits
KRAP	1350 AM	Washington	Computraffic, Inc.	Hot adult contemporary
KRCU	90.9 FM	Cape Girardeau	Board of Regents, Southeast Missouri State University	Public radio
KREI	800 AM	Farmington	Alpha Media Licensee LLC	Podcast
KRES	104.7 FM	Moberly	Alpha Media Licensee LLC	Classic country
KREZ	104.7 FM	Chaffee	Withers Broadcasting Company of Missouri, LLC	Soft adult contemporary
KRFL-LP	107.9 FM	Fulton	Revelation for Living Broadcasting, Inc.	Christian
KRHS	90.1 FM	Overland	Ritenour Consolidated School Dist.	Grade school (K-12)
KRHW	1520 AM	Sikeston	Withers Broadcasting Company of SE Missouri, LLC	Country
KRLI	103.9 FM	Malta Bend	Carter Media LLC	Classic country
KRLL	1420 AM	California	Moniteau Communications, Inc.	Country
KRMO	990 AM	Cassville	Eagle Broadcasting, Inc.	Country
KRMS	1150 AM	Osage Beach	Viper Communications, Inc.	News/Talk
KRMS-FM	93.5 FM	Osage Beach	Viper Communications, Inc.	Classic rock
KRNW	88.9 FM	Chillicothe	Northwest Missouri State University	News/Talk
KROL	1430 AM	Carrollton	Carter Media LLC	Top 40 (CHR)
KRRY	100.9 FM	Canton	Townsquare License, LLC	Classic rock
KRSS	93.5 FM	Tarkio	Radio Free Ministries, Inc.	Religious
KRTE-FM	107.3 FM	Steelville	East Central Broadcasting, LLC	Conservative Talk
KRTK	93.3 FM	Hermann	East Central Broadcasting, LLC	Conservative talk
KRVI	106.7 FM	Mount Vernon	SM-KRVI, LLC	Classic rock
KRXL	94.5 FM	Kirksville	KIRX Incorporated	Classic rock
KRZK	106.3 FM	Branson	KOMC-KRZK, LLC	Classic country
KSAR	92.3 FM	Thayer	Bragg Broadcasting Corporation	Full service
KSCV	90.1 FM	Springfield	Community Broadcasting, Inc.	Religious Talk (Bott Radio Network)
KSD	93.7 FM	St. Louis	iHM Licenses, LLC	Country
KSDC-LP	94.9 FM	Centralia	Sunnydale Adventist Academy	Religious (Radio 74 Internationale)
KSDL	92.3 FM	Sedalia	Townsquare License, LLC	Adult contemporary
KSDQ	88.7 FM	Moberly	Sunnydale Seventh-day Adventist Church	Religious (3ABN Radio)
KSEF	88.9 FM	Ste. Genevieve	Board of Regents, Southeast Missouri State University	Public radio
KSGF-FM	104.1 FM	Ash Grove	SM-KSGF-FM, LLC	News/Talk
KSHE	94.7 FM	Crestwood	St. Louis FCC License Sub, LLC	Classic rock
KSHQ	100.7 FM	Deerfield	One Media, Inc.	Sports (ESPN)
KSIM	1400 AM	Sikeston	MRR License LLC	News/Talk
KSIQ-LP	99.5 FM	St. Louis	St. Louis Majestic Basketball Club	
KSIS	1050 AM	Sedalia	Townsquare License, LLC	News/Talk
KSIV	1320 AM	Clayton	Bott Communications, Inc.	Religious Talk (Bott Radio Network)
KSIV-FM	91.5 FM	St. Louis	Community Broadcasting, Inc.	Religious Talk (Bott Radio Network)
KSJI	91.1 FM	St. Joseph	University of Northwestern – St. Paul	Christian adult contemporary
KSJQ	92.7 FM	Savannah	Eagle Communications, Inc.	Country
KSLN-LP	95.9 FM	Sullivan	Sullivan Seventh-Day Adventist Church	Christian
KSLQ-FM	104.5 FM	Washington	Y2K, Inc.	Hot adult contemporary
KSLZ	107.7 FM	St. Louis	iHM Licenses, LLC	Top 40 (CHR)
KSMO	1340 AM	Salem	KSMO Enterprises	Country
KSMS-FM	90.5 FM	Point Lookout	Board of Governors of Missouri State University	Classical/NPR
KSMU	91.1 FM	Springfield	Board of Governors of Missouri State University	Classical/NPR
KSMW	90.3 FM	West Plains	Board of Governors of Missouri State University	Classical/NPR
KSOZ-LP	96.5 FM	Salem	Salem Christian Catholic Radio	Catholic
KSPQ	93.9 FM	West Plains	Better Newspapers, Inc.	Classic rock
KSPW	96.5 FM	Sparta	SM-KSPW, LLC	Top 40 (CHR)
KSRD	91.9 FM	St. Joseph	Educational Media Foundation	Contemporary worship (Air1)
KSSZ	93.9 FM	Fayette	Zimmer Radio of Mid-Missouri, Inc.	Talk
KSTL	690 AM	St. Louis	Church of God in Christ, Inc.	Urban contemporary gospel
KSWF	100.5 FM	Aurora	iHM Licenses, LLC	Country
KSWM	940 AM	Aurora	Falcon Broadcasting, Inc.	News/Talk
KSYN	92.5 FM	Joplin	Zimmer Radio Group	Top 40 (CHR)
KTBG	90.9 FM	Warrensburg	Public Television 19, Inc.	NPR/Variety
KTBJ	89.3 FM	Festus	CSN International	Religious (CSN International)
KTCM	97.3 FM	Madison	Alpha Media Licensee LLC	Contemporary Christian
KTGR	1580 AM	Columbia	Zimmer Radio of Mid-Missouri, Inc.	Sports (ESPN)
KTGR-FM	100.5 FM	Fulton	Zimmer Radio of Mid-Missouri, Inc.	Sports (ESPN)
KTJJ	98.5 FM	Farmington	Alpha Media Licensee LLC	Country
KTKS	95.1 FM	Versailles	Benne Broadcasting of Versailles, LLC	Country
KTMO	106.5 FM	New Madrid	Pollack Broadcasting Co.	Country
KTNX	103.9 FM	Arcadia	Dockins Broadcast Group, LLC	Classic rock
KTOZ-FM	95.5 FM	Pleasant Hope	iHM Licenses, LLC	Adult top 40/Hot AC
KTRM	88.7 FM	Kirksville	Truman State University	Alternative/Rock/NPR (varies)
KTRS	550 AM	St. Louis	KTRS-AM License, L.L.C.	News/Talk
KTTK	90.7 FM	Lebanon	Lebanon Educational Broadcasting Foundation	Gospel
KTTN	1600 AM	Trenton	Luehrs Broadcasting Co. Inc.	Adult contemporary
KTTN-FM	92.3 FM	Trenton	Luehrs Broadcasting Company, Inc.	Country
KTTR	1490 AM	Rolla	KTTR-KZNN, Inc.	Sports (ESPN)
KTTR-FM	99.7 FM	St. James	KTTR-KZNN, Inc.	News/Sports/Talk
KTTS-FM	94.7 FM	Springfield	SM-KTTS, LLC	Country
KTUF	93.7 FM	Kirksville	KIRX Incorporated	Country
KTUI	1560 AM	Sullivan	Meramec Area Broadcasting LLC	Talk
KTUI-FM	102.1 FM	Sullivan	Meramec Area Broadcasting LLC	Country
KTXR	98.7 FM	Springfield	Zimmer Midwest Communications, Inc.	Soft adult contemporary
KTXY	106.9 FM	Jefferson City	Zimmer Radio of Mid-Missouri, Inc.	Top 40 (CHR)
KUKU-FM	100.3 FM	Willow Springs	Better Newspapers, Inc.	Classic country
KULH	105.9 FM	Wheeling	Resources Management Unlimited, Inc.	Contemporary Christian
KUMR	104.5 FM	Doolittle	Benne Broadcasting of the Ozark, LLC	Classic hits
KUNQ	99.3 FM	Houston	Media Professional, LLC	Country
KUPH	96.9 FM	Mountain View	Better Newspapers, Inc.	Top 40 (CHR)
KVMO	104.3 FM	Vandalia	East Central Broadcasting, LLC	Conservative talk
KVSR	90.7 FM	Kirksville	University of Northwestern – St. Paul	Christian adult contemporary (Spirit FM)
KVTS-LP	107.9 FM	Republic	Calvary Chapel of Republic	Religious Teaching
KVVL	97.1 FM	Maryville	Regional Media, Inc.	Classic rock
KWAP-LP	97.5 FM	Florissant	Regeneration Outreach Center	Urban contemporary
KWBZ	107.5 FM	Monroe City	LB Sports Productions LLC	Country
KWEB-LP	98.5 FM	Webb City	Webb City Public Service Broadcasters	Variety
KWEC-LP	106.9 FM	Saint Charles	West End Church of Christ	Christian
KWFC	89.1 FM	Springfield	Radio Training Network, Inc.	Gospel
KWIX	1230 AM	Moberly	Alpha Media Licensee LLC	News/Talk
KWIX-FM	92.5 FM	Cairo	Alpha Media Licensee LLC	Talk
KWJC	91.9 FM	Liberty	The Curators of the University of Missouri	Classical
KWJK	93.1 FM	Boonville	Billings Broadcasting, LLC	Adult hits
KWKJ	98.5 FM	Windsor	D & H Media, LLC	Country
KWKZ	106.1 FM	Charleston	Dockins Broadcast Group, LLC	Country
KWMU	90.7 FM	St. Louis	The Curators of the University of Missouri	Public radio
KWND	88.3 FM	Springfield	Radio Training Network, Inc.	Contemporary Christian
KWOC	930 AM	Poplar Bluff	MRR License LLC	News/Talk
KWOS	950 AM	Jefferson City	Zimmer Radio of Mid-Missouri, Inc.	News/Talk
KWPM	1450 AM	West Plains	Better Newspapers, Inc.	News/Talk
KWPQ-LP	103.3 FM	Springfield	Willow's Wood Community Network	Variety
KWRE	730 AM	Warrenton	Kaspar Broadcasting Co of Missouri	Classic country
KWRH-LP	92.9 FM	Webster Groves	Motif Media Group	Variety
KWRT	1370 AM	Boonville	Billings Broadcasting, LLC	Country
KWTO	560 AM	Springfield	Zimmer Midwest Communications, Inc.	News/Talk
KWTO-FM	101.3 FM	Buffalo	Zimmer Midwest Communications, Inc.	Classic country
KWUL	920 AM	St. Louis	East Central Broadcasting, LLC	Americana
KWUR	90.3 FM	Clayton	Washington University in St. Louis	College radio
KWWR	95.7 FM	Mexico	KXEO Radio, Inc.	Country
KWWU-LP	94.9 FM	Fulton	William Woods University	Variety
KWXD	103.5 FM	Asbury	My Town Media Inc.	Adult hits
KXCV	90.5 FM	Maryville	Northwest Missouri State Univ.	News/Talk
KXDG	97.9 FM	Webb City	Zimmer Radio, Inc.	Mainstream rock
KXEA	104.9 FM	Lowry City	Radford Media Group, LLC	Hot adult contemporary
KXEO	1340 AM	Mexico	KXEO Radio, Inc.	Adult contemporary
KXFN	1380 AM	St. Louis	The Lutheran Church – Missouri Synod	Christian
KXKX	105.7 FM	Knob Noster	Townsquare License, LLC	Country
KXMO-FM	95.3 FM	Owensville	KTTR-KZNN, Inc.	Classic hits
KXMS	88.7 FM	Joplin	Board of Governors – Missouri Southern State University	Classical
KXOK-LP	102.9 FM	St. Louis	Radio St. Louis	Variety
KXOQ	104.3 FM	Kennett	Eagle Bluff Enterprises	Classic rock
KXUS	97.3 FM	Springfield	iHM Licenses, LLC	Mainstream rock
KYEC	88.3 FM	Doniphan	Central Educational Radio	Hot adult contemporary
KYFI	630 AM	St. Louis	Bible Broadcasting Network, Inc.	Conservative religious (Bible Broadcasting Network)
KYHO-LP	106.9 FM	Poplar Bluff	Vision Broadcasting of Poplar Bluff, Inc.	Christian
KYKY	98.1 FM	St. Louis	Audacy License, LLC	Adult top 40
KYLF	88.9 FM	Adrian	Community Broadcasting, Inc.	Religious Talk (Bott Radio Network)
KYLS	1450 AM	Fredericktown	Dockins Broadcast Group, LLC	Hot adult contemporary
KYLS-FM	95.9 FM	Ironton	Dockins Broadcast Group, LLC	Country
KYMO	1080 AM	East Prairie	Delta Broadcasting, LLC	Classic country
KYMO-FM	98.9 FM	Bertrand	Delta Broadcasting, LLC	Classic hits
KYOO	1200 AM	Bolivar	Benne Broadcasting of Bolivar, LLC	Country
KYOO-FM	99.1 FM	Halfway	Benne Broadcasting of Bolivar, LLC	Country
KYRO	1280 AM	Troy	Lincoln County Broadcasting LLC	News/Talk
KYRX	97.3 FM	Marble Hill	Withers Broadcasting Company of Missouri, LLC	Sports (FSR)
KYSJ	1270 AM	St. Joseph	Eagle Communications, Inc.	Classic rock
KZBK	96.9 FM	Brookfield	Best Broadcasting, Inc.	Hot adult contemporary
KZGM	88.1 FM	Cabool	Real Community Radio Network	Community radio
KZIM	960 AM	Cape Girardeau	MRR License LLC	News/Talk
KZLX-LP	106.7 FM	Maryville	Northwest Foundation, Incorporated	Adult album alternative
KZMA	99.9 FM	Naylor	Daniel S. Stratemeyer	Adult contemporary
KZMO	93.7 FM	Fair Grove	Zimmer Midwest Communications, Inc.	Country
KZNN	105.3 FM	Rolla	KTTR-KZNN, Inc.	Country
KZPT	99.7 FM	Kansas City	Audacy License, LLC	Hot adult contemporary
KZRG	1310 AM	Joplin	Zimmer Radio, Inc.	News/Talk
KZWV	101.9 FM	Eldon	Zimmer Radio of Mid-Missouri, Inc.	Adult contemporary
KZYM	1230 AM	Joplin	Zimmer Radio, Inc.	Talk
KZZK	105.9 FM	New London	Staradio Corp.	Mainstream rock
KZZT	105.5 FM	Moberly	FM-105, Inc.	Classic rock
WDAF-FM	106.5 FM	Liberty	Audacy License, LLC	Country
WEW	770 AM	St. Louis	Birach Broadcasting Corporation	Ethnic
WFUN-FM	96.3 FM	St. Louis	Audacy License, LLC	Adult contemporary R&B
WGCQ	98.7 FM	Hayti	Pollack Broadcasting Co.	Adult standards/MOR
WHB	810 AM	Kansas City	Union Broadcasting	Sports (ESPN)
WIL-FM	92.3 FM	St. Louis	St. Louis FCC License Sub, LLC	Country
WMBH	1560 AM	Joplin	Land Go Radio Group LLC	Sports (ISN/VSIN)
WRJE-LP	96.1 FM	St. Joseph	Radio Joe, Inc.	Educational
WRVX	91.7 FM	Cameron	VCY America, Inc.	Conservative Christian (VCY America)

== Defunct ==
- KADI
- KADY
- KBMX
- KCHR
- KCSW-LP
- KDFN
- KDKD
- KDKN
- KDMC-LP
- KDNA
- KELE
- KESM
- KFMZ
- KIRL
- KITE
- KLWT
- KMAM
- KMTS
- KQBD
- KQPW-LP
- KQXQ
- KSGF
- KUKU
- KWK
- KXBR
- KXOK
- KZJF
- KZQZ
- WOQ
