= KOMC =

KOMC may refer to:

- KOMC-FM, a radio station (100.1 FM) licensed to serve Kimberling City, Missouri
- KCAX, a radio station (1220 AM) licensed to serve Branson, Missouri, United States, which held the call sign KOMC from 1986 to 2016
