= KTUI =

KTUI may refer to:

- KTUI (AM), a radio station (1560 AM) licensed to Sullivan, Missouri, United States
- KTUI-FM, a radio station (102.1 FM) licensed to Sullivan, Missouri, United States
