= KMMO =

KMMO may refer to:

- KMMO (AM), a radio station (1300 AM) licensed to Marshall, Missouri, United States
- KMMO-FM, a radio station (102.9 FM) licensed to Marshall, Missouri, United States
