= KLTI =

Coordinates: 37°11′30″N 93°32′22″W

- Macon, Missouri; United States
- Broadcast area: Macon, Randolph & Shelby County, Missouri
- Frequency: 1560 kHz
- Branding: True Country

Programming
- Format: Country

Ownership
- Owner: Best Broadcast Group; (Chirillo Electronics)
- Sister stations: KZZT, KFMZ, KZBK, KMCR

History
- First air date: 1966
- Call sign meaning: K LeTourneau Institute

Technical information
- Licensing authority: FCC
- Facility ID: 43535
- Class: D
- Power: 1,000 watts (day); 41 watts (night)
- Translators: 93.3 K227BO (Macon); 102.7 K274CE (Cairo); 106.5 K293BX (Moberly)

Links
- Public license information: Public file; LMS
- Website: kltiradio.com

KLTI (1560 AM, "True Country 1560") is a radio station licensed to serve Macon, Missouri, United States. The station is owned by Best Broadcast Group and the broadcast license is held by Chirillo Electronics.

KLTI broadcasts a country music format. Past formats have included Urban Oldies, Rhythmic Oldies, All 70s, Hot AC and Classic Country.

The station was assigned the KLTI call letters by the Federal Communications Commission.

== History of call letters ==
The call letters KLTI were previously assigned to an AM station in Longview, Texas. It began broadcasting October 27, 1948, on 1280 kHz with 1 KW power (daytime). The station was owned by R.G. LeTourneau, who also owned sister station KLTI-FM.
