= KTTN =

KTTN may refer to:

- The ICAO code for Trenton-Mercer Airport
- KTTN (AM), a radio station (1600 AM) licensed to Trenton, Missouri, United States
- KTTN-FM, a radio station (92.3 FM) licensed to Trenton, Missouri, United States
