= KDEX =

KDEX may refer to:

- KDEX (AM), a radio station (1590 AM) licensed to Dexter, Missouri, United States
- KDEX-FM, a radio station (102.3 FM) licensed to Dexter, Missouri
