= KHCR =

KHCR may refer to:

- KHCR (FM), a radio station (99.5 FM) licensed to serve Bismarck, Missouri, United States
- Heber City Municipal Airport (ICAO code KHCR)
