= KRFG =

KRFG may refer to:

- KRFG (FM), a radio station (102.9 FM) licensed to serve Nashwauk, Minnesota, United States
- KRFG (defunct), a defunct radio station (93.5 FM) formerly licensed to serve Greenfield, Missouri, United States
