= KSCM =

KSCM may refer to:

- KSCM (FM), a radio station (94.3 FM) licensed to serve Scammon Bay, Alaska, United States
- KUNQ, a radio station (99.3 FM) licensed to serve Houston, Missouri, United States, which held the call sign KSCM-FM from 1972 to 1987
- KSCM-LP, a defunct low-power television station (channel 18) formerly licensed to Bryan, Texas, United States
- Communist Party of Bohemia and Moravia, known in Czech as "Komunistická strana Čech a Moravy" (KSČM)
