= KONN =

KONN may refer to:

- KONN-LP, a low-power radio station (100.1 FM) licensed to serve Kansas City, Missouri, United States
- KFCO, a radio station (107.1 FM) licensed to serve Bennett, Colorado, United States, which held the call sign KONN-FM from 2008 to 2009
