= KTNX =

KTNX may refer to:

- KTNX (FM), a radio station (103.9 FM) licensed to Arcadia, Missouri, United States
- Tonopah Test Range Airport (ICAO code KTNX)
