= KBTC =

KBTC may refer to:

- KBTC (AM), a radio station (1250 AM) licensed to Houston, Missouri, United States
- KBTC-TV, a television station (channel 28) licensed to Tacoma, Washington, United States
