= KGNV =

KGNV may refer to:

- KGNV (FM), a radio station (89.9 FM) licensed to Washington, Missouri, United States
- the ICAO code for Gainesville Regional Airport
