= KCHR =

KCHR may refer to:

- KCHR-FM, a radio station (107.3 FM) licensed to serve Cotton Plant, Arkansas, United States
- KCHR (AM), a defunct radio station (1350 AM) formerly licensed to serve Charleston, Missouri, United States
