= KPBR =

KPBR may refer to:

- KPBR (FM), a radio station (91.7 FM) licensed to Poplar Bluff, Missouri, United States
- KWMY, a radio station (105.9 FM) licensed to Joliet, Montana, United States, which held the call sign KPBR from 2006 to 2009
