= KMEM =

KMEM may refer to:

- the ICAO code for Frederick W. Smith International Airport, in Memphis, Tennessee, United States
- KMEM-FM, a radio station (100.5 FM) licensed to Memphis, Missouri, United States
- A Linux system device which allows examination of computer memory
