= KPOW =

KPOW may refer to:

- KPOW (AM), a radio station (1260 AM) licensed to Powell, Wyoming, United States
- KPOW-FM, a radio station (97.7 FM) licensed to La Monte, Missouri, United States
