= KWMO =

KWMO may refer to:

- KWMO-LD, a low-power television station (channel 29, virtual 34) licensed to serve Hot Springs, Arkansas, United States
- KRAP, a radio station (1350 AM) licensed to serve Washington, Missouri, United States, which held the call sign KWMO from 1998 to 2014
