= KGNX =

Radio station in Ballwin–St. Louis, Missouri

- Ballwin, Missouri; United States
- Broadcast area: St. Louis, Missouri
- Frequency: 89.7 MHz
- Branding: The Good News Voice

Programming
- Format: Religious
- Affiliations: The Good News Voice; Moody Broadcasting Network

Ownership
- Owner: Missouri River Christian Broadcasting, Inc.
- Sister stations: KGNA-FM, KGNV, KGNN-FM

History
- First air date: c. 1978
- Former call signs: KYMC

Technical information
- Licensing authority: FCC
- Facility ID: 66671
- Class: A
- ERP: 120 watts
- HAAT: 52 meters (171 feet)
- Transmitter coordinates: 38°37′23″N 90°32′01″W

Links
- Public license information: Public file; LMS
- Website: goodnewsvoice.org

KGNX (89.7 FM) is a radio station licensed to serve Ballwin, Missouri, United States. The station is owned by Missouri River Christian Broadcasting, Inc., and airs religious programming as an affiliate of The Good News Voice and a member of the Moody Broadcasting Network.

== Programming ==
KGNX airs a variety of Christian Talk and Teaching programs including; Back to the Bible, Focus on the Family, Grace to You with John MacArthur, Revive our Hearts with Nancy Leigh DeMoss, Insight for Living with Chuck Swindoll, Truth for Life with Alistair Begg, In the Market with Janet Parshall, Love Worth Finding with Adrian Rogers, Turning Point with David Jeremiah, Joni & Friends, and Unshackled!. KGNX also airs Christian music overnight.

== The YMCA years ==
From the station's sign-on in 1978 until September 2008, this station was owned by West County Family YMCA, a branch of the YMCA of Greater St. Louis, and served the western St Louis, Missouri, area. The station was assigned the KYMC call letters by the Federal Communications Commission in 1978 and was granted its initial license to cover on June 19, 1980. KYMC was the only radio station owned by a YMCA in the United States.

=== Programming ===
KYMC took to the air waves in the Winter-Spring of 1978 as "KLMA" 89.9 FM. During the construction permit phase and early months or weeks of broadcasting it was determined that the call letters KLMA were already being used, so the call sign was changed to KYMC. The initial sign on frequency was 89.9 FM and the initial transmitter power was 10 watts, on a horizontal polarized loop antenna about 40 to 50 feet up on the small self-supporting tower. In the days before deregulation, drop-in FM signals, and crowding on the FM dial, this signal power put out a reliable 8- to 15-mile signal from the transmitter site on a hill at 224 West Clayton Road, on a small tower behind Don Kohn's Wildwood TV repair retail store. Donald Kohn was the chief engineer, equipment supplier, studio builder, and driving force behind putting KYMC on the air. Initial programming on KY-90 and KYMC was originally known consisted of typical mass appeal popular music (top 40, rock, disco, and country-rock) with some specialty shows featuring jazz music and country-rock music. Specialty programs also included local high school sports play-by-play (Parkway West and Lafayette High School). The youthful disc jockeys and announcers and board operators all came from Parkway West and Lafayette High school, and to a lesser degree from Parkway Central and Parkway North. Typical top 40/pop music (similar to KSLQ, KXOK, WLS, KSD or KIRL) was the dominant music format for the first 5 to 10 years of KYMC's broadcast history. When automation came to KYMC, in the late 1980s the format changed to an adult contemporary format borrowed from 55 KSD's music library, utilizing the old KSD control board in the studios and the stereo music stream was changed to a lower quality monaural FM. High school student broadcast staff involvement changed and an affiliation with Maryville University supplied college student air staff for a time. At some point the transmitter power was increased to over 100 watts, the frequency changed to 89.7 FM and the tower site was relocated onto a shared cellphone tower off Clayton Road.

KYMC was the first alternative rock station in the St. Louis area and was a non-commercial station. In the 1990s many bands played their music live in the studio, including Everclear, Alanis Morissette and Live.

Former logo (2007)

At its peak in the Spring of 1992, KYMC was run by program director Glen Allen and music director Greg Berg. The station was officially managed by YMCA employee Ruth Ady. Under the leadership of Glen Allen, the station achieved tremendous success by streamlining the alternative rock music format for the Saint Louis audience, a first in the area. Incoming funding from pledge drives and sponsorships reached an all-time high for the station. The popularity of the alternative rock format on such a small station helped pave the way for viability of the format on a larger scale. KPNT (105.7 The Point) began operation soon after that in March 1993. Greg Berg was one of the few KYMC DJs to be hired as on-air talent by The Point.

The station's popularity fell into decline as its content became more fragmented. Income from pledge drives and sponsorships waned. Under the leadership of General Manager, Natalie Hall, by the end of 2006, KYMC was beginning to regain notoriety. Re-branded with a new logo and website, revenue was steadily increasing. KYMC was running state of the art programming software and gaining additional sponsorships. By the end of the station's run, KYMC was looking into technology for streaming online.

=== Controversy ===
During KYMC's peak in popularity in the Spring of 1992, general manager Ruth Ady used most of the station revenues for other YMCA programs, leaving the station's broadcasting equipment in a constant state of dysfunction. In May 1992, Ruth Ady fired Glen Allen, Greg Berg, and most of the DJ staff, with the intention of turning the station back into "kiddy radio camp" for the YMCA. Large protests were organized by Joey Jay and some of the remaining DJs, receiving front page coverage in the St. Louis Post-Dispatch.

=== Falling silent ===
"Effective Jan. 1, (2007) the station will go dark," said Denise Glass, executive director of the West County Family YMCA, "The YMCA of Greater St. Louis is a not-for-profit charitable organization. During our budget process for 2007, it was determined we would cease operations of the station due to budgetary constraints."

"Annual Campaign dollars were thought to have subsidized the operations of the radio station, regardless of dollars raised, the executive director and district vice president concluded campaign money was better spent in other areas", says former General Manager, Natalie Hall. "It is a sad day for all who devoted time and effort into making KYMC a great community outlet."

After officially falling silent on January 8, 2007, the station applied to the FCC for special temporary authority to remain silent and authorization was granted on January 9, 2007. This authority was renewed by the FCC on January 30, 2008. This authority was set to expire on July 28, 2008. A grassroots movement to "save" KYMC sprung up but was ultimately unsuccessful.

== New ownership ==
In July 2008 and with the final remain silent authority about to expire, the YMCA of Greater St. Louis reached an agreement to sell this station to Missouri River Christian Broadcasting, Inc. The deal was approved by the FCC on August 22, 2008, and the transaction was consummated on September 19, 2008. The new owners announced plans to return KYMC to the air with religious programming as a member of "The Good News Voice" network of stations, featuring some programming from the Moody Broadcasting Network. KGNX simulcasts the programming of KGNV in Washington, Missouri, KGNA-FM in Arnold, Missouri, and KGNN-FM in Cuba, Missouri. On October 30, 2008, KYMC was granted a main studio waiver allowing the station to be run from facilities outside the station's community of license. The station changed its call sign from KYMC to KGNX on August 28, 2009.
