= KUDV =

- Bloomfield, Iowa; United States
- Broadcast area: Ottumwa, Iowa
- Frequency: 106.9 MHz
- Branding: Hometown Radio 106.9-FM in Bloomfield

Programming
- Format: Superstar Country
- Affiliations: ABC News Radio

Ownership
- Owner: Mark and Karen McVey; (Tri-Rivers Broadcasting Company)
- Sister stations: KMEM

History
- First air date: 1982 (as KXOF)
- Former call signs: KXOF (1982–2002); KOJY (2002–2006); KDMU (2006–2009); KOJY (2009–2016)

Technical information
- Licensing authority: FCC
- Facility ID: 27659
- Class: C3
- ERP: 14,000 watts
- HAAT: 112 m (367 ft)
- Transmitter coordinates: 40°46′39″N 92°23′54″W

Links
- Public license information: Public file; LMS
- Webcast: Listen live
- Website: www.kmemfm.com

KUDV (106.9 FM) is a commercial radio station that serves the Bloomfield, Iowa and Ottumwa, Iowa area. The station broadcasts a superstar country format. KUDV is licensed to Mark and Karen McVey, through licensee Tri-Rivers Broadcasting Company. The station formerly simulcasted a classic hits format with KMEM-FM in Memphis, Missouri as "Mustang" until then-KDMU switched back to a gospel format and changed call signs back to KOJY.

Previous logo

The station was originally licensed as KXOF on June 21, 1982 but changed callsigns to KOJY on July 6, 2002 and to KDMU on February 27, 2006, only to change back to KOJY on July 14, 2009. The station changed its call sign to KUDV on September 3, 2016. On September 5, 2016 KUDV changed their format to classic hits.

On May 2, 2022 the station switched to a superstar country music format.

The transmitter and broadcast tower are located 2 miles northeast of Bloomfield along U.S. Route 63. According to the Antenna Structure Registration database, the tower is 104 m (341 ft) tall with the FM broadcast antenna mounted at the 101 m (331 ft) level. The calculated Height Above Average Terrain is 112 m (367 ft).
