= KLOZ =

- Eldon, Missouri; United States
- Broadcast area: Lake of the Ozarks; Jefferson City, Missouri
- Frequency: 92.7 MHz
- Branding: Mix 92.7

Programming
- Format: Hot adult contemporary

Ownership
- Owner: Benne Media; (Benne Broadcasting Company, LLC)
- Sister stations: KDRO, KPOW-FM

History
- First air date: November 1982 (as KLDN)
- Former call signs: KLDN (1982–1987)
- Call sign meaning: K Lake of the OZ arks

Technical information
- Licensing authority: FCC
- Class: C2
- ERP: 31,000 watts
- HAAT: 189 meters (620 feet)
- Transmitter coordinates: 38°20′27″N 92°35′33″W

Links
- Public license information: Public file; LMS
- Website: mix927.com

KLOZ (92.7 FM, "Mix 92.7") is a radio station licensed to serve Eldon, Missouri, United States. The station is owned by Benne Media and the license is held by Benne Broadcasting Company, LLC.

It broadcasts a hot adult contemporary music format.

The station was assigned the KLOZ call letters by the Federal Communications Commission on December 13, 1987.

== History ==
In November 1982, Eldon Broadcasting Company, Inc., reached an agreement to sell this station to Southwest Communications, Inc. The deal was approved by the FCC on December 30, 1982, and the transaction was consummated on February 7, 1983.

In March 1987, Southwest Communications, Inc., reached an agreement to sell this station to CTC Communications, Inc. The deal was approved by the FCC on May 1, 1987, and the transaction was consummated on June 29, 1987.

In July 1992, CTC Communications, Inc., reached an agreement to sell this station to Capital Media, Inc. The deal was approved by the FCC on September 4, 1992, and the transaction was consummated on October 20, 1992.

In April 1997, Capital Media, Inc., reached an agreement to sell this station to a Benne Media holding company called Benne Broadcasting Company, LLC. The deal was approved by the FCC on May 20, 1997, and the transaction was consummated on May 29, 1997.
