= KUMR =

Coordinates: 37.9393°N 91.9460°W

- Doolittle, Missouri; United States
- Broadcast area: Rolla, Missouri Waynesville, Missouri
- Frequency: 104.5 MHz
- Branding: Sunny 104.5

Programming
- Format: Classic Hits

Ownership
- Owner: Dennis Benne; (Benne Broadcasting of the Ozark, LLC)

History
- First air date: 2010

Technical information
- Licensing authority: FCC
- Facility ID: 171018
- Class: A
- ERP: 3,900 watts
- HAAT: 124 meters

Links
- Public license information: Public file; LMS

KUMR is a radio station located in Doolittle, Missouri and broadcasting on 104.5 MHz FM; it is on the air with a Lite AC format, which later twisted into an adult contemporary format. The station calls itself "Sunny 104.5" and now features a Classic Hits format.

The KUMR call sign was once used by KMST, the Missouri University of Science and Technology's radio station.

== See also ==
- List of radio stations in Missouri
