= KMEM-FM =

KMEM
- Memphis, Missouri; United States
- Frequency: 100.5 MHz
- Branding: KMEM 100.5

Programming
- Language: English
- Format: Country, Sports
- Affiliations: Missouri Broadcasters Association, St. Louis Cardinals radio network, Missouri Tigers radio network, Brownfield, ABC News Radio, MissouriNet, Radio Iowa, Motor Racing Network

Ownership
- Owner: Tri-Rivers Broadcasting
- Sister stations: KUDV

History
- First air date: March 29, 1982
- Call sign meaning: Memphis

Technical information
- Licensing authority: FCC
- Facility ID: 6584
- Class: C3
- ERP: 25,000 watts
- HAAT: 91 meters (299 ft)

Links
- Public license information: Public file; LMS
- Webcast: Listen live
- Website: kmemfm.com

KMEM-FM (100.5 FM) is a radio station licensed to the city of Memphis, Missouri, United States. It serves the tri-state area of northeast Missouri, southeast Iowa and western Illinois. KMEM-FM broadcasts a country music format with additional emphasis on local and regional sports broadcasting. The station is an affiliate of the St. Louis Cardinals radio network and the Missouri Tigers radio network.

== History ==
KMEM first signed on the air March 29, 1982. Original owner Sam Berkowitz had previous broadcast industry experience at KIRX/KRXL radio group in Kirksville, Missouri. At first KMEM was located in a portion of a Memphis motel, and broadcast on 96.7 MHz/Channel 244 with 3,000 watts power. Berkowitz and his family owned and operated the station until 1988 when it was purchased by the Boyer Broadcasting Group. In 2001 KMEM-FM was sold to the current owners Tri-Rivers Broadcasting. Two member partners of Tri-Rivers, Mark and Karen McVey, also own radio station KUDV in Bloomfield, Iowa. The station would move frequency to 100.5 and increase power to 25,000 watts in the late 1990s. In addition to Missouri Tigers and St. Louis Cardinals games KMEM-FM broadcasts a large amount of local high school sports from northeast Missouri schools.
