= KXOK =

KXOK may refer to:

- KXOK-LD, a low-power television station (channel 31) licensed to serve Enid, Oklahoma, United States
- KXOK-LP (Missouri), a low-power radio station (102.9 FM) licensed to serve St. Louis, Missouri, United States; see List of radio stations in Missouri
- KXOK-LP (California), a defunct low-power radio station (107.9 FM) formerly licensed to serve Modesto, California, United States
- KFTK-FM, a radio station (97.1 FM) licensed to serve Florissant, Missouri, United States, which held the call sign KXOK-FM from 1992 to 2000
- KYFI, a radio station (630 AM) licensed to serve St. Louis, Missouri, which held the call sign KXOK from 1940 to 1994
