= KDRO =

- Sedalia, Missouri; United States
- Broadcast area: Sedalia, Missouri
- Frequency: 1490 kHz
- Branding: KDRO Hometown Country 1490 AM and 101.3 FM

Programming
- Format: Country

Ownership
- Owner: Benne Media; (Mathewson Broadcasting Company)
- Sister stations: KLOZ; KPOW-FM

History
- First air date: September 13, 1939

Technical information
- Licensing authority: FCC
- Facility ID: 40662
- Class: C
- Power: 780 watts (unlimited)
- Transmitter coordinates: 38°40′35.1″N 93°15′16.7″W
- Translator: 101.3 K267CO (Sedalia)

Links
- Public license information: Public file; LMS
- Webcast: Listen live
- Website: www.kdro.com

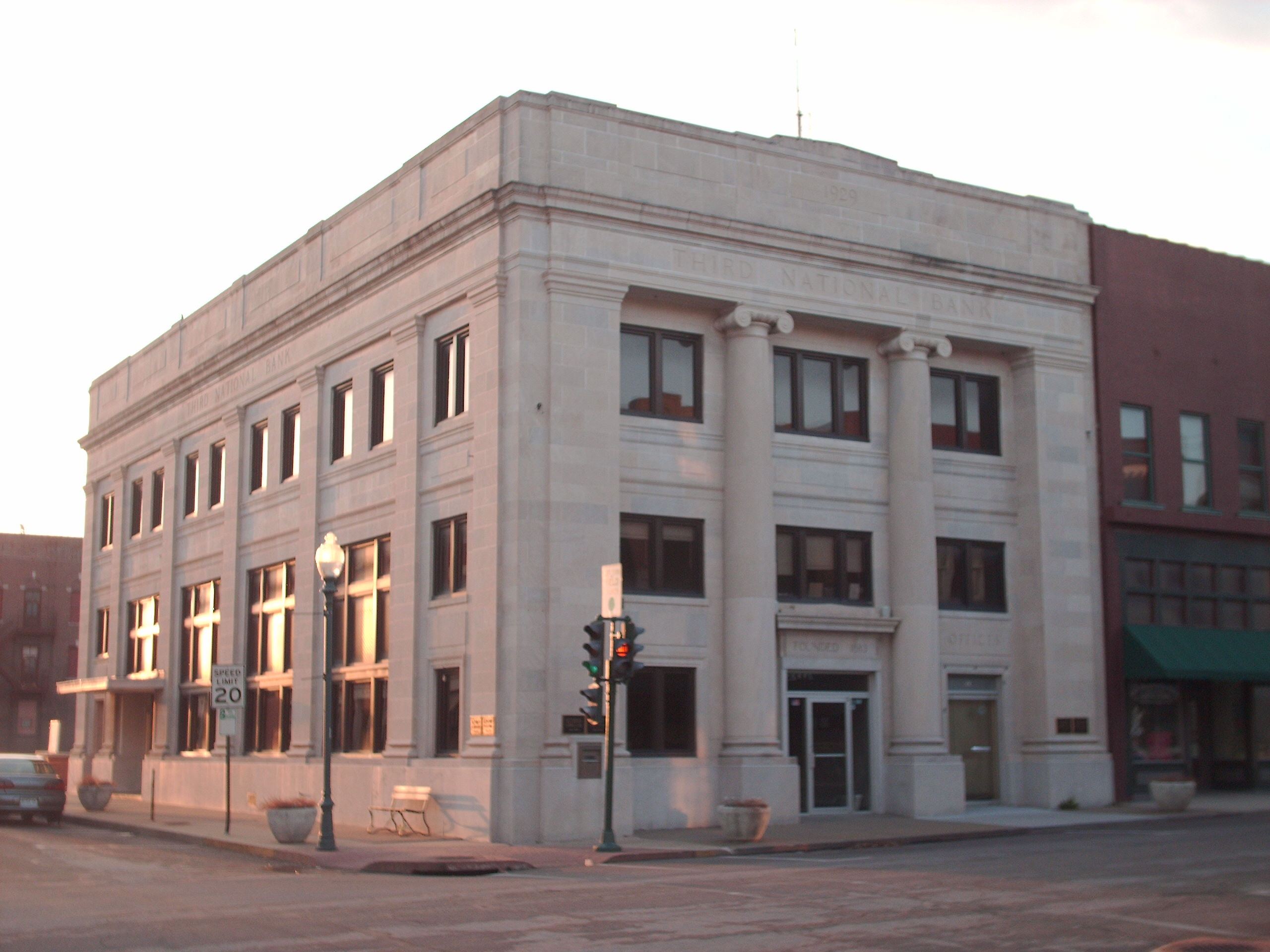
KDRO/KPOW Studios located at 301 South Ohio Avenue in Sedalia, the former Third National Bank

KDRO (1490 AM, "Hometown Country 1490 AM and 101.3 FM") is a radio station licensed to serve Sedalia, Missouri, United States. The station is owned by Benne Media and licensed to Mathewson Broadcasting Company. KDRO broadcasts a country music format.

== History ==
KDRO first signed on the air at 1490 kHz on September 13, 1939.

In February 1990, Sedalia Broadcasting Corporation reached an agreement to sell this station to Mathewson Broadcasting Co. The deal was approved by the FCC on April 16, 1990, and the transaction was consummated on June 7, 1990.

In April 2006, Jim Mathewson of Mathewson Broadcasting Co. entered into a local marketing agreement with Denny Benne of Benne Broadcasting.

In early 2017, KDRO switched to a news/talk format. As of 2023, KDRO and its translator, K267CO (101.3 FM) broadcast a country music format.
