= KFMO =

- Park Hills, Missouri; United States
- Broadcast area: Farmington, Missouri
- Frequency: 1240 kHz
- Branding: AM 1240 KFMO

Programming
- Language: English
- Format: News/talk
- Affiliations: Fox News Radio; Compass Media Networks; Premiere Networks; Red Apple Media; Salem Radio Network; USA Radio Network; Westwood One

Ownership
- Owner: Chelley and Chuck Odle; (Odle Media Group, LLC)
- Sister stations: KDBB

History
- First air date: July 1, 1947
- Call sign meaning: Flat River, MO

Technical information
- Licensing authority: FCC
- Facility ID: 55100
- Class: C
- Power: 1,000 watts (unlimited)
- Transmitter coordinates: 37°51′10″N 90°31′13″W

Links
- Public license information: Public file; LMS
- Webcast: Listen live
- Website: kfmo.com

KFMO (1240 AM, "AM 1240 KFMO") is an American radio station licensed to serve the community of Flat River, Missouri. The station's broadcast license is held by Chelley and Chuck Odle, through licensee Odle Media Group, LLC.

The station, established in 1947, was assigned the call sign KFMO by the Federal Communications Commission (FCC).

KFMO 1240 was established by Oscar Hersch, KFMO was the first radio station in St. Francois County. Jim and Virginia Collins managed the station for more than 20 years.

== Programming ==
KFMO broadcasts a news/talk format. As of January 2012, local weekday programming includes The Start with Dustin Kopp. Syndicated programming includes talk shows hosted by Sean Hannity, and Dave Ramsey plus Local High School Sports Coverage.

In March 2021, the station rebranded itself as the "Parklands Freedom Leader," adding more news/talk programming to replace CBS Sports Radio. Syndicated programs including talk shows hosted by Mark Levin, Glenn Beck, and Bill O'Reilly were all added to the station's on air lineup.
