= KMAM =

Butler, Missouri; United States
- Frequency: 1530 kHz
- Branding: The Bullet

Programming
- Language: English
- Format: Defunct (was country)
- Affiliations: Westwood One, ABC News

Ownership
- Owner: Bates County Broadcasting Company
- Sister stations: KMOE (92.1 FM)

History
- First air date: May 11, 1962
- Last air date: February 6, 2024

Technical information
- Licensing authority: FCC
- Facility ID: 4047
- Class: D
- Power: 500 watts (day-only)
- Transmitter coordinates: 38°14′56″N 94°19′18″W

Links
- Public license information: Public file; LMS
- Website: 921news.com

KMAM (1530 AM, "The Bullet") was an American radio station licensed to serve the community of Butler, Missouri. The station's broadcast license was held by Bates County Broadcasting Company. KMAM had been owned and operated by members of the Thornton family since it was founded in 1962.

KMAM was a "daytimer", licensed to operate only from local sunrise to local sunset to protect radio stations KFBK in Sacramento, California, and WCKY in Cincinnati, Ohio from skywave interference. The station was assigned the call sign KMAM by the Federal Communications Commission (FCC).

== Programming ==
KMAM had broadcast a full service country music format, including programming from Westwood One, in simulcast with sister station KMOE (92.1 FM). In addition to its music programming, KMAM aired local news, farm and market reports, ABC News Radio, a daily obituary report, and a tradio program called Swap Shop. Sunday programming includes Gospel music, local church services, Gun Talk Radio, plus news and sports updates.

Bates County Broadcasting surrendered KMAM's license to the Federal Communications Commission on January 30, 2024, and it was cancelled on February 6.
