= KTUF =

Coordinates: 40.188°N 92.526°W

- Kirksville, Missouri; United States
- Frequency: 93.7 MHz
- Branding: You're in Today's Best Country

Programming
- Language: English
- Format: Country music
- Affiliations: ABC News Radio; Associated Press; Compass Media Networks; Missouri Broadcasters Association; Missouri Sports Network; Premiere Networks; Westwood One

Ownership
- Owner: KIRX Incorporated
- Sister stations: KRXL; KIRX

History
- Call sign meaning: "Kirksville gets TUF" (shows country (and former rock) music format)

Technical information
- Licensing authority: FCC
- Facility ID: 471
- Class: C2
- ERP: 50,000 watts
- HAAT: 150 meters (490 ft)

Links
- Public license information: Public file; LMS
- Website: www.radiokv.com/ktuf-93-7/

KTUF (93.7 MHz) is a commercial FM radio station licensed to the city of Kirksville, Missouri, United States, and serves the northeast Missouri and southeast Iowa area.

== History ==
KIRKSVILLE GETS TUF: In late 1981 Admiral Broadcasting Incorporated, under the direction of CEO Irving Davis, petitioned the Federal Communications Commission for licensing & broadcasting rights for the call letters KTUF on frequency 93.5 FM assigned to the city of Kirksville, Missouri under FCC Docket 80-90. Approval was granted in 1982 and work soon began to establish a broadcasting studio and office, as well as rental of tower antenna space. Just after the start of 1983 an innovative marketing campaign began for the new station featuring photos of various citizens and local celebrities wearing boxing gloves and the slogan "Kirksville Gets Tuf. Punch 93.5 K-TUF". While sweethearts were giving each other flowers and candy on Valentine's Day, February 14, 1983 saw the gift of a new radio station to the northeast Missouri airwaves as KTUF signed on for the stations first day of broadcasting. The music format at sign-on was Top 40/CHR with a slightly heavier rock/AOR influence during the evening and overnight hours. In 1988, Admiral Broadcasting received FCC approval to increase broadcasting power from the original 3,000 watts on frequency 93.5 to 50,000 watts on frequency 93.7 from a newly constructed tower on the eastern edge of Kirksville. The increased power greatly expanded KTUF's reachable audience from Adair County, Missouri and its bordering counties, into large portions of northcentral Missouri and southeast Iowa. The music format also changed somewhat, with less emphasis on rock and metal—with the exception of those artist found on the Top 40 music charts.

DEATH AND REBIRTH: Fans of KTUF were shocked and saddened to learn in the summer of 1995 that their station would be no more as they knew it. After rule changes by the FCC allowed for ownership of more than one FM station in the same broadcasting market, Admiral Broadcasting sold KTUF to cross-town competitor KIRX Incorporated, operator of KIRX AM and KRXL FM. Due to the sale and the desire to consolidate the KTUF studio into the same building as KIRX and KRXL, KTUF was off the air for a number of weeks. On a sunny, crisp late October morning in 1995 the new KTUF was born. Under the slogan "Todays Best Country. K-TUF" the station returned to the airwaves with an all-new airstaff and country music format. Longtime KIRX morning anchor Marvin McClanahan and mid-day host Helen Adams anchored the new KTUF morning show until McClanahan retired in late December, 2009, and Adams in mid-April, 2012. Currently most of KTUF's announcers are syndicated via satellite delivery such as Dakota Summers, Brian Douglas, and Lia.

On April 17, 2013, KTUF suffered significant damage due to a lightning strike at their broadcast tower site. The strike caused a subsequent fire which destroyed the stations main and backup transmitters as well as major damage to the transmitter building itself. Because of the damage KTUF was off the air for several days.

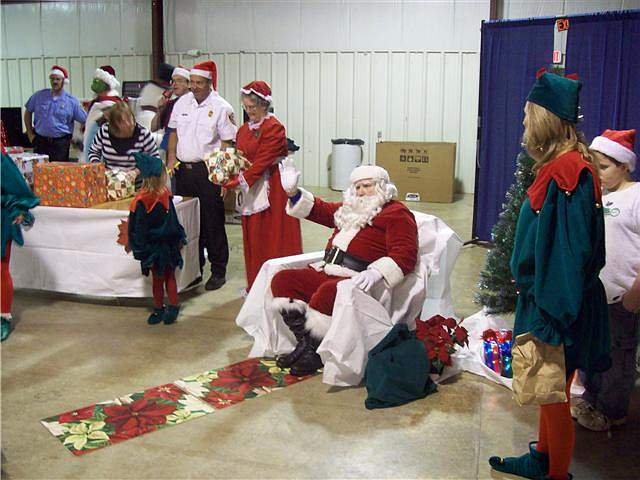
Santa greets children at the KTUF Adopt-A-Child party for underprivileged children.

KTUF is very active in community affairs, helping raise funds for an Adair County veterans memorial, the American Red Cross disaster relief, and most notably the annual 'Adopt-A-Child' program each holiday season, where listeners can call in and pledge to purchase a toy or other needed item for underprivileged children in the Adair County area. In addition to country music and local/national news, KTUF is also northeast Missouri's source for radio broadcasts of University of Missouri football and basketball games.
