= KMST (FM) =

Coordinates: 37.7989°N 91.7246°W

Simulcast of KWMU, St. Louis
- Rolla, Missouri; United States
- Frequency: 88.5 MHz

Programming
- Format: Public radio
- Affiliations: National Public Radio

Ownership
- Owner: University of Missouri–St. Louis; (The Curators of the University of Missouri)
- Sister stations: KWMU

History
- Former call signs: KMSM (1964–1974); KUMR (1974–2007)
- Call sign meaning: Missouri University of Science and Technology

Technical information
- Licensing authority: FCC
- Facility ID: 69041
- Class: C1
- ERP: 100,000 watts
- HAAT: 146 meters (479 ft)

Links
- Public license information: Public file; LMS

KMST is a radio station licensed to Rolla, Missouri, and operated by the University of Missouri at St. Louis as an extension of St. Louis Public Radio. The station broadcasts at 88.5 FM with an effective radiated power of 100,000 watts, making it the most powerful public radio station in south-central Missouri.

Historically, the station's programming has consisted of several genres of music such as classical and jazz as well as several popular National Public Radio programs such as All Things Considered, A Prairie Home Companion, Car Talk, and Michael Feldman's Whad'Ya Know? show. The station originated a weekly science talk show, titled We're Science, which was syndicated nationwide for several years in the mid-1990s.

The station originally broadcast under the call letters KUMR, from the abbreviation of the station's home, the University of Missouri–Rolla, through 2006. On January 1, 2008, the University of Missouri–Rolla changed its name to Missouri University of Science and Technology. As a result, the station's original call sign, KUMR, was changed to KMST on July 16, 2007, as a reflection of the university's forthcoming name change.

Until 2017, KMST broadcast from studios in the basement of the Curtis Laws Wilson library on the UMR/Missouri S&T campus. Effective July 1, 2017, the station (including its Lebanon translator) was transferred to the University of Missouri-St. Louis and became part of the St. Louis Public Radio network, airing the same broadcast as the St. Louis frequency. The only local programming retained through the changeover was Wayne Bledsoe's Bluegrass for a Saturday Night, a local staple for many decades, which continued until Bledsoe's August 2017 retirement. Missouri S&T opted to end KMST's local operations after the University of Missouri system suffered a massive budget cut that led school officials to conclude KMST was no longer part of the school's "academic core."

KMST was also heard in Lebanon, Missouri via translator K242AN on 96.3 MHz, until the translator went silent in August 2020; its license was cancelled by the Federal Communications Commission on March 28, 2022.

On February 10, 2025, St. Louis Public Radio announced UMSL will be transferring the licenses for KWMU, KMST, and WQUB to Friends of KWMU, Inc.

== See also ==
- KUMR
- KMNR
- St. Louis Public Radio
