= KKOZ (AM) =

KKOZ and KKOZ-FM

Ava, Missouri; United States
- Frequencies: KKOZ: 1430 kHz; KKOZ-FM: 92.1 MHz
- Branding: Cause Country 1430AM/92.1FM

Programming
- Format: Talk radio; Country music

Ownership
- Owner: Corum Industries, Inc.

History
- First air date: KKOZ: August 30, 1968; KKOZ-FM: 1990

Technical information
- Licensing authority: FCC
- Facility ID: KKOZ: 35030; KKOZ-FM: 13972
- Class: KKOZ: D; KKOZ-FM: A
- Power: KKOZ: 500 watts (day); 20 watts (night)
- ERP: KKOZ-FM: 4,500 watts
- HAAT: KKOZ-FM: 116 meters (381 ft)
- Transmitter coordinates: KKOZ: 36°55′48.00″N 92°39′19.00″W

Links
- Public license information: KKOZ: Public file; LMS; KKOZ-FM: Public file; LMS
- Webcast: Listen Live
- Website: www.kkoz.com

KKOZ (AM) & KKOZ-FM are simulcasting radio stations broadcasting on the frequencies of 1430 kHz and 92.1 MHz. KKOZ AM & FM are owned by Corum Industries, Inc. 1430 kHz is a regional broadcast frequency.

The format is News, Talk & Information plus Country music and the stations are located in Ava, Missouri.

KKOZ (pronounced "Cause Radio" when referencing the station on-air) focuses on presenting their listeners with live high school sports coverage, producing and broadcasting football, volleyball, basketball, baseball, and softball games live and on tape delay, as well as other community centered programs. KKOZ is also an affiliate of several professional sports play-by-play networks, including the Kansas City Chiefs, Kansas City Royals, and MRN NASCAR Cup Series Racing national radio networks.
