= KDBB =

- Bonne Terre, Missouri; United States
- Broadcast area: Farmington, Missouri Potosi, Missouri
- Frequency: 104.3 MHz
- Branding: B 104.3

Programming
- Format: Classic hits

Ownership
- Owner: Theresa and Jay Odle; (Odle Media Group, LLC)
- Sister stations: KFMO

History
- First air date: 1989

Technical information
- Licensing authority: FCC
- Facility ID: 43278
- Class: A
- ERP: 1,650 watts
- HAAT: 202 meters (663 ft)
- Transmitter coordinates: 37°48′1″N 90°33′47″W

Links
- Public license information: Public file; LMS
- Webcast: Listen Live
- Website: b104fm.com

KDBB (104.3 FM) is a radio station licensed to Bonne Terre, Missouri, United States. The station is currently owned by Theresa and Jay Odle, through licensee Odle Media Group, LLC.
