= KSLQ-FM =

- Washington, Missouri; United States
- Broadcast area: St. Louis area
- Frequency: 104.5 MHz
- Branding: Q FM 104.5

Programming
- Format: Hot adult contemporary
- Affiliations: Fox, Premiere, Compass Media, Weatherology, KRAP

Ownership
- Owner: Y2k, Inc.
- Sister stations: KRAP

History
- First air date: November 21, 1989

Technical information
- Facility ID: 53550
- Class: A
- ERP: 3,000 watts
- HAAT: 100.0 meters (328.1 ft)
- Transmitter coordinates: 38°36′3.00″N 90°56′4.00″W

Links
- Website: westplextalk.com

KSLQ-FM (104.5 FM) is a talk radio station serving the Westplex part of the St Louis area (St Charles County and nearby counties) with local talk shows including the Brad and John Show as well as nationally syndicated talk programming, under the nickname "Westplex Talk".

The station began broadcasting in 1989, and formerly used a hot adult contemporary format. In 2023 it shifted to a podcast format, and (as of 2026) is now a talk station.

(The call letters KSLQ had formerly been assigned to what is now KYKY (98.1 FM) in St Louis, from September 1, 1972 until October 1, 1982. This KSLQ broadcast a top-40 pop/rock format for most of its run, using the nickname "Super-Q".)

Licensed to Washington, Missouri, United States, the station serves Warren, Franklin, and St. Charles Counties in Missouri, as well as parts of western St. Louis County. The station is currently owned by Y2k, Inc. Brad Hildebrand, the current General Manager, originally worked at the first KSLQ (98.1 FM) from 1973 through 1982, and then at successor KYKY from 1982 through 1990.

On November 3, 2023, the Federal Communications Commission issued an Order to Pay or to Show Cause for KSLQ-FM to pay delinquent regulatory fees totaling just under $26,000 covering fiscal years 2010 through 2023. Y2k was given sixty days to pay the past due fees or show cause why "these regulatory fees are inapplicable or should otherwise be waived or deferred." The Notice officially constitutes the initiation of a proceeding to revoke the licenses if Y2k fails to respond.

The issue was resolved with the FCC in January 2024. There were several payments made by Y2K that were not property credited. The remaining balance owed by Y2K was paid to the FCC and KSLQ-FM's license was renewed on January 26th 2024 with the new expiration date of February 1, 2029
