= KFMZ =

Radio station in Brookfield, Missouri

Coordinates: 39°50′27.6″N 93°4′51.6″W

- Brookfield, Missouri; United States
- Frequency: 1470 kHz

Programming
- Format: Hot adult contemporary (partial simulcast of KZBK)

Ownership
- Owner: Best Broadcast Group
- Sister stations: KZBK

History
- First air date: February 14, 1956 (as KGHM)
- Former call signs: KGHM (1956–1985); KGNG (1985–1993); KZBK (1993–2002)
- Call sign meaning: Former call letters of 98.3 FM Columbia

Technical information
- Licensing authority: FCC
- Facility ID: 2
- Class: D
- Power: 500 watts day; 20 watts night
- ERP: (K241BT) 250 watts
- Translator: 96.1 K241BT (Brookfield)

Links
- Public license information: Public file; LMS
- Website: www.bestbroadcastgroup.com

KFMZ is a radio station at 1470 AM in Brookfield, Missouri. The station is owned by the Best Broadcast Group and carries a hot adult contemporary format, primarily simulcasting KZBK 96.9 FM. KFMZ is also heard on FM translator K241BT at 96.1 FM.

== History ==
The station went on air February 14, 1956, as KGHM (for Green Hills of Missouri). The station was constructed by the Green Hills Broadcasting Company, which was owned by Ira Williams. George P. Williams became the owner in 1965; W-H Enterprises acquired KGHM in 1970; and the station was sold to Brookfield Broadcasting in 1974.

In 1980, the station was sold to Hampro-Wireless. Hampro ownership, while short, was consequential, as the company received the construction permit to build a new FM radio station to accompany KGHM. KQMO 97.7, now KZBK 96.9, signed on August 17, 1981, simulcasting the AM station during the day and airing its own programming until midnight. Two years later, however, KGHM-KQMO went silent and remained so for a year until the station was sold to Dwight and Carolyn Carver in 1984. The resumption of operations of both stations was delayed into 1985 by FCC requirements. After the sale, both stations changed call letters: KQMO became KZBK, while KGHM became KGNG ("Good News of God") with gospel music.

Best acquired KGNG-KZBK in 1993. The two stations became KZBK-AM-FM, simulcasting Best flagship KZZT in Moberly. The simulcast of KZZT ended in 1995 when Best completed construction of a new KZBK-FM facility at 96.9 MHz, and the two stations began carrying their own programming.

On January 15, 2002, KZBK AM became KFMZ. The call letters had been deleted three months prior from a station in Columbia whose license was revoked.
