= KGOZ =

- Gallatin, Missouri; United States
- Broadcast area: Northwest Missouri
- Frequency: 101.7 MHz
- Branding: Z 101.7

Programming
- Language: English
- Format: Country
- Affiliations: Dial Global motor racing network

Ownership
- Owner: Par Broadcast Group; (Par Broadcasting Company, Inc.)
- Sister stations: KTTN, KTTN-FM

History
- First air date: 1994

Technical information
- Licensing authority: FCC
- Facility ID: 51516
- Class: C3
- ERP: 15,000 watts
- HAAT: 129 meters (423 ft)
- Transmitter coordinates: 39°53′14″N 93°43′24″W

Links
- Public license information: Public file; LMS
- Website: kgozfm.com

KGOZ (101.7 FM, "Z 101.7") is an American radio station licensed to serve Gallatin, the county seat of Daviess County, Missouri. The station, established in 1994, is owned by the Par Broadcast Group and the broadcast license is held by Par Broadcasting Company, Inc. The station's tower is located in northwestern Livingston County, Missouri, near the community of Lock Springs. The studios are located in Trenton, Missouri.

The station was assigned the call sign "KGOZ" by the Federal Communications Commission (FCC) on February 26, 1993.

== Programming ==
KGOZ broadcasts a country music format to north central Missouri. KGOZ airs North Central Missouri College sports, including women's and men's basketball Region 16 games and selected baseball and softball games, in addition to selected high school sporting events, including being the home of Trenton High School football.
