= KMNR =

- United States
- Broadcast area: Rolla, Missouri
- Frequencies: 88.5 (as KMSM), 89.7 (MHz)
- Branding: KMNR-Rolla 89.7 FM

Programming
- Format: Free-format

Ownership
- Owner: The Board of Curators of the University of Missouri

History
- First air date: ~1961 (as KMFA), 1964 (as KMSM), 1972 (as KMNR)

Technical information
- Licensing authority: FCC
- Facility ID: 14740
- Class: A
- ERP: 1850 watts
- HAAT: 114 meters (374 ft)
- Transmitter coordinates: 37°57′07″N 91°46′12″W

Links
- Public license information: Public file; LMS
- Website: kmnr.org

KMNR is an American non-commercial, educational, FM radio station licensed to the Board of Curators of the University of Missouri. However, KMNR is fully funded and operated by students at Missouri University of Science and Technology (formerly known as the University of Missouri–Rolla).

KMNR strives to provide educational, entertaining, and informative radio programming as a public service to the students, faculty, and administration of Missouri S&T and for the people of Phelps County.

== Programming ==
KMNR is a "free-format" station. This means the on-air DJ chooses all program content, with the exception of standard educational productions, which KMNR airs to serve the public interest.

== Personnel ==
KMNR is staffed entirely by students. Programming is provided by volunteer DJs. Station administration is performed by a seven-member executive board that is elected once per year from the body of DJs. As of November 2024, the station listed 78 active DJs.

== History ==
The first inkling of a Missouri S&T student-run radio station was conceived in the early 1960s (when the school was known as Missouri School of Mines (MSM)). Some MSM students, including Roger Beckman, fabricated a makeshift radio station in the dormitories which was unofficially called KMFA, these letters standing for the original four buildings in the Quadrangle residential complex: Kelly, McAnerney, Farrar, and Altman Hall (although it was also known by something else – Kool MF Association). The station was located in the northwest corner in the basement of Altman Hall and egg cartons were used on the walls and ceiling to improve acoustics. Around 1962, Beckman suggested a campus-owned, student-run radio station to Student Council officer Dale Marshall who brought up the suggestion to Dean Wilson one night at a meeting. Wilson requested Marshall to submit a project report, which was immediately approved upon review.

The project was on hold for one year while students brainstormed and developed the future radio station as well as familiarized themselves with the scrutiny of the Federal Communications Commission (FCC). Finally in 1964, what was once a student prototype in the dorms of MSM, became a bona fide campus-owned student-run radio station with call letters of KMSM. It first started playing jazz, easy listening, and light and heavy classical music in order for listeners to have an alternative venue to the rock and country music played by other Rolla radio stations. Dr. Wells Leitner became the first faculty adviser; Jerry Kettler was the first educational program director; Wayne Huckabee was the first music director; Mike DeVaney was the first business director; and Dale Marshall became the first station manager. The executive board hired its DJs, paying them a "princely" wage of fifty cents an hour. Today's KMNR DJs work only for the love of free format radio.

KMSM's call letters became KMNR in 1972. The "MNR" is a reference to Missouri S&T's mascot, Joe Miner. KMST, formerly named KUMR, is a separate public radio station. KMNR's studio has had at least three locations. The first known location was in T-6, a temporary building between Harris Hall and the current Mechanical Engineering Extension. As T-6 was 'temporary' the university allowed the students who supported KMNR to personalize the interior not only with various rooms but also with elaborate murals painted on the walls, the most prominent being the iconic "KMNR Boeing 747" painted in the 1970s, later replaced with the KMNR Space Shuttle in 1983. KMNR was located in T-6 from the early 1970s to 1997. The original layout of the radio station was almost doubled in area in 1984 by the renovation of the space to the east of the control room, resulting in a larger library, larger lobby, and a large production room/studio to the northeast of the control room. The original lobby, and the famous nooks and crannies that existed in that awkward space were sealed-off. In 1997 T-6 was demolished to make room for a parking lot and KMNR was moved to a leased building at the corner of 12th and Pine Streets that had formerly housed a bookstore and fitness center. The building's interior was gutted and reconstructed to modern studio standards and KMNR remained there until 2005. KMNR's current location is the first floor of Altman Hall at the corner of 10th and State Streets. The station is now in the same building where its forerunner KMFA began.

== Gallery ==
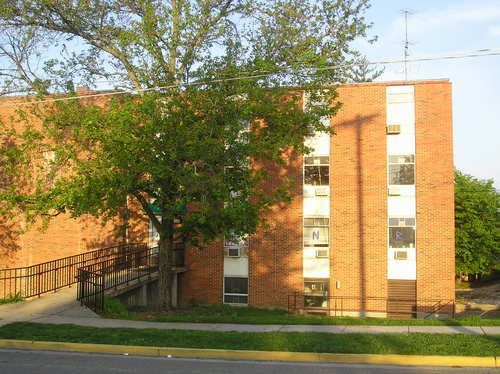
KMNR's building at 10th and State Street

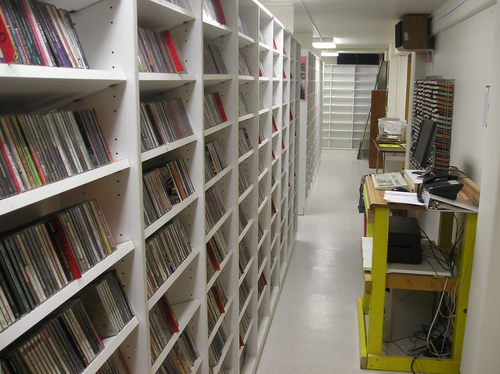
KMNR's music library

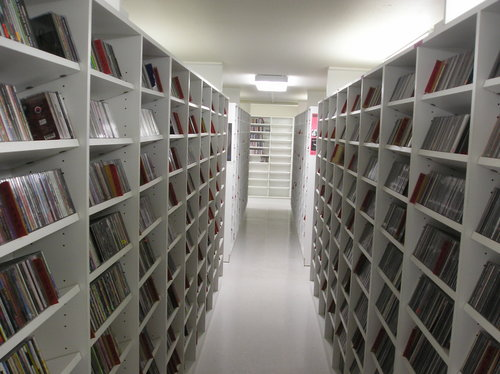
KMNR's CD collection

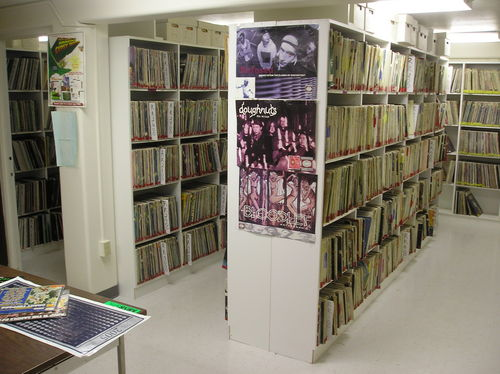
KMNR's LP collection

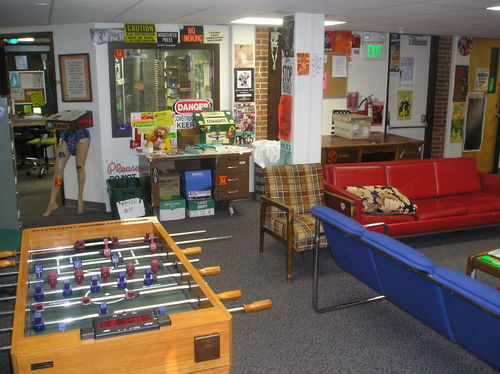
KMNR's lobby

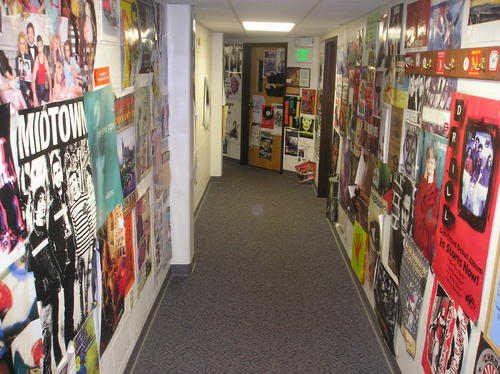
A KMNR hallway

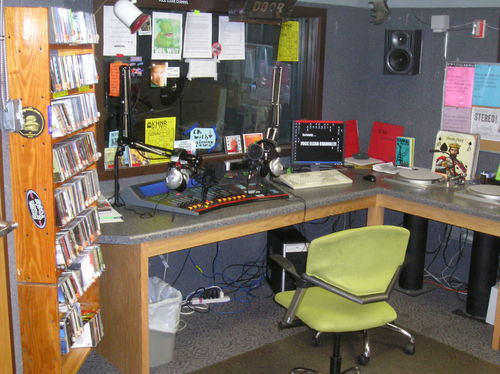
KMNR's control room

== Historical photos ==
Sitting is Kathy Dolson, behind her is Matthew Koebbe and by the wall is Steve Hendren. Pic is around 1986, in the second version of the old T-6 building.

Helen's dad shaking hands with Louie Armstrong.

Sean Copeland on the soundboard. In the booth we had Eric Bussen, Jim Hunt, Tyler Harris, producing the Mega-Rad radio show. They went back that same day to eat cashew chicken.

Old T-6 Control Booth with Unknown DJ (1987).

Left to right on the couch: Eric Bussen, Steve Hendren, Matt Koebbe behind his motorcycle with sidecar outside old T-6 KMNR. On the chair is Sylvia Carty (not yet Carty at this point). It was a beautiful Spring day, and they had to pull the furniture out to enjoy the day.

Sean Copeland at the booth Mega-Rad sketch where Mega-Rad was trying to go get hamburgers at the Slide-Rite Eats. Mega-Rad: post apocalyptic super hero and his mutant boy Spot. And he was saying, "Hamburger, hamburger, hamburger, onions!"

Part of the 2nd mural version in the old T-6 building, right before the wall was destroyed and a move to the 3rd version. This was visible as one walked through on the way into the station, the Lobby.

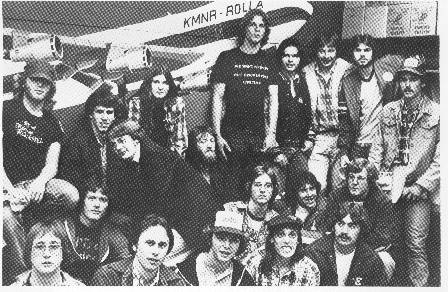
1982 at T-6 with original mural of the iconic KMNR 747, before renovations to production room and library. Station manager Aaron Lloyd, Gary Krecji, Gene Williams, and others.

Helen's Dad and Dizzy Gillespie

The Spring 1987 KMNR station photo in the old Mining Building. First row: Cindy Walk, Jennifer Jones, Brent Jones, Vito Biundo (Ex-Station Manager), ?, Gene Hoeltge, ?, Steve Hendren, George Carini (Dr. Sunshine Show), ?, ?. Second Row: Monster #?, ?, Bryan Adams, Jeff Brown, Jennifer Sommers, Jim Column, ?, ?, ?, ?. Third Row: Bald Dude, Kathy Dolsen (Former Personnel Director, Station Manager), ?, ?, Bob Linke, ?, James Haring, ?, ?, ?. Fourth Row: Scott Birdsong, Jeff Leith and Alletta Curtis (married), Eric Bussen, Dave Meriwether, ?, Mike Harvey (Ex-Station Manager), Rick Karbowski, ?, ?, ?, ?. Top Row: Doug Moyer, Kid with Had, ?, ?, Guy with Umbrella, Dean McDowell, Don Grahler, Greg Boice, Jim Calzone, Joe Heberlie, ?.

Grateful Dead – Haight and Ashbury

Grateful Dead

Tyler Harris, freakin' at the 1986 Freakers' Ball. Greg Boice in back with his tongue sticking out.

== See also ==
- Campus radio
- List of college radio stations in the United States
