= KRZK =

Radio station in Branson, Missouri

Coordinates: 36.731°N 93.167°W

- Branson, Missouri; United States
- Broadcast area: Branson, Missouri
- Frequency: 106.3 MHz
- Branding: Legends 106.3

Programming
- Format: Classic country

Ownership
- Owner: Mike Huckabee; (Ozark Mountain Media Group, LLC)
- Sister stations: KCAX, KOMC-FM, KHOZ, KHBZ

History
- First air date: 1971 (as KIRK-FM)
- Former call signs: KIRK-FM (1971–1983)

Technical information
- Licensing authority: FCC
- Facility ID: 68416
- Class: C2
- ERP: 27,000 watts
- HAAT: 201 meters (659 ft)

Links
- Public license information: Public file; LMS
- Webcast: Listen Live
- Website: krzk.com hometowndailynews.com

KRZK (106.3 FM) is a radio station broadcasting a classic country format. Licensed to Branson, Missouri, United States, it serves the Springfield, Missouri, area. The station is currently owned by Mike Huckabee, through the licensee Ozark Mountain Media Group, LLC.

KRZK was originally owned by Turtle Broadcasting Company of Branson, a subsidiary of Orr & Earls Broadcasting, Inc. It was purchased in 1986 along with KRZK-FM, both of which were off the air at the time. Co-principal, Roderick Orr, sold his interest in the company to Charles Earles in 2004. Earls Broadcasting sold the station to Ozark Mountain Media Group, effective December 10, 2018.

== Format history ==
September 1991 - December 3, 2012 Country Music

December 3, 2012 - May 27, 2016: Your News. Straight Talk.

May 27, 2016 - June 30, 2017: Classic Hits/Today's Talk

June 30, 2017 - August 27, 2020: Branson's Official Hometown Country Station

August 27, 2020 : Legends 106.3
