= KESM-FM =

- El Dorado Springs, Missouri; United States
- Frequency: 105.5 MHz
- Branding: Home of the Big Ape

Programming
- Format: Country music
- Affiliations: Westwood One

Ownership
- Owner: Wildwood Communications

History
- Former frequencies: KESM (1580 kHz)

Technical information
- Licensing authority: FCC
- Facility ID: 72447
- Class: A
- ERP: 6,000 watts
- HAAT: 57.0 meters (187.0 ft)
- Transmitter coordinates: 37°51′51″N 94°0′54″W

Links
- Public license information: Public file; LMS
- Website: Official website

KESM-FM (105.5 FM, Home of the Big Ape) is a radio station broadcasting a country music format. Licensed to El Dorado Springs, Missouri, United States, the station is owned by Wildwood Communications and features programming from Westwood One.

Wildwood previously held a sister station operating as KESM on 1580 kHz. KESM's license was surrendered to the Federal Communications Commission on August 31, 2015, and cancelled on September 1, 2015.
