= KMOE =

- Butler, Missouri; United States
- Frequency: 92.1 MHz
- Branding: The Bullet

Programming
- Language: English
- Format: Country
- Affiliations: Westwood One, ABC News

Ownership
- Owner: Bates County Broadcasting Company

History
- First air date: January 15, 1975
- Former frequencies: 105.5 MHz (1975–1976)

Technical information
- Licensing authority: FCC
- Facility ID: 4048
- Class: A
- Power: 4,700 watts
- HAAT: 45 meters (148 ft)
- Transmitter coordinates: 38°14′56″N 94°19′18″W

Links
- Public license information: Public file; LMS
- Webcast: Listen Live
- Website: 921news.com

KMOE (92.1 FM, "The Bullet") is an American radio station licensed to serve the community of Butler, Missouri. The station's broadcast license is held by Bates County Broadcasting Company.

KMOE has been owned and operated by members of the Thornton family since it was founded in 1975. The station was assigned the call sign "KMOE" by the Federal Communications Commission (FCC).

== Programming ==
KMOE broadcasts a full service country music format, including programming from Westwood One. In addition to its music programming, KMOE airs local news, farm and market reports, ABC News Radio, a daily obituary report, and a tradio program called Swap Shop. Sunday programming includes Gospel music, local church services, Gun Talk Radio, plus news and sports updates.

KMOE's programming was simulcast on a sister station, KMAM (1530 AM), until that station's closure in 2024.
