= KZZT =

Radio station in Moberly, Missouri

- Moberly, Missouri; United States
- Broadcast area: Columbia, Missouri Macon, Missouri
- Frequency: 105.5 MHz
- Branding: "KZ-105"

Programming
- Format: Classic rock
- Affiliations: ABC Radio

Ownership
- Owner: Best Broadcast Group; (FM-105, Inc.)
- Sister stations: KLTI, KZBK, KMCR

History
- First air date: April 1987

Technical information
- Licensing authority: FCC
- Facility ID: 21914
- Class: C2
- ERP: 50,000 watts
- HAAT: 150 meters
- Transmitter coordinates: 39°26′2.00″N 92°14′24.00″W

Links
- Public license information: Public file; LMS
- Website: kzztradio.com

KZZT (105.5 FM) is a radio station broadcasting a classic rock format. Licensed to Moberly, Missouri, United States, the station serves the Columbia area. The station is currently owned by Best Broadcast Group and licensed to FM-105, Inc. and features programming from ABC Radio and some local DJs.

== History ==
KZZT's early history had multiple formats within its first few years of operation. It started life with a rock-leaned Top 40 format but would eventually add a minimum amount of pop titles within months later. In the 1990s, the station had an adult contemporary format, but flipped to oldies in the late-1990s as "KZ-105". Its format was updated to classic hits in the mid-2000s. The station flipped to its current classic rock format in 2010.
