= KRXL =

Coordinates: 40.243°N 92.429°W

- Kirksville, Missouri; United States
- Broadcast area: Kirksville, Missouri; Ottumwa, Iowa; Quincy, Illinois
- Frequency: 94.5 (MHz)
- Branding: 94.5 The X

Programming
- Format: Rock/Classic rock
- Affiliations: Kansas City Chiefs, United Stations Radio Networks

Ownership
- Owner: KIRX, Inc.
- Sister stations: KIRX, KTUF

History
- First air date: September 17, 1967
- Call sign meaning: Variant of KIRX

Technical information
- Licensing authority: FCC
- Facility ID: 34973
- Class: C
- ERP: 100,000 watts
- HAAT: 308 meters

Links
- Public license information: Public file; LMS
- Website: radioKV

KRXL is the regional Rock/Classic rock radio station in the Kirksville, Missouri area. KRXL's primary audience is in the Kirksville/Ottumwa area, however their signal can reach places as far as Keokuk, Iowa, Quincy, Illinois, Chillicothe, Missouri, and Moberly, Missouri. Time Warp with Bill St. James is heard Sundays 7am - 11am

== History ==
KRXL was founded by Sam & Vera Burk in 1967, as an outgrowth of their successful AM station KIRX. At sign-on, September 17, 1967, KRXL had an effective radiated power of 52,000 watts. This was increased to the FCC maximum 100,000 watts in 1986. The KRXL music format was Easy Listening for many years, but by the late 1970s more Pop, Top 40, and Rock could be heard. A format known as Adult Contemporary welcomed the early 1980s airwaves, and remained that way until the end of the decade with a switch to Classic Rock. KRXL has a consistent history of award-winning broadcasting with multiple awards from the Associated Press and Missouri Broadcasters Association in categories such as news, DJ, and commercial production.
