= KTTN (AM) =

- Trenton, Missouri; United States
- Frequency: 1600 kHz
- Branding: AM 1600 KTTN

Programming
- Language: English
- Format: Adult contemporary
- Affiliations: Westwood One; Kansas City Royals Radio Network

Ownership
- Owner: John Ausberger; (Luehrs Broadcasting Company, Inc.)
- Sister stations: KGOZ, KTTN-FM

History
- First air date: April 17, 1955
- Call sign meaning: TrenToN'

Technical information
- Licensing authority: FCC
- Facility ID: 39167
- Class: D
- Power: 500 watts (day); 33 watts (night)
- Transmitter coordinates: 40°05′00″N 93°33′30″W
- Translator: 98.3 K252FT (Trenton)

Links
- Public license information: Public file; LMS
- Website: kttn.com

KTTN (1600 AM) is an American radio station licensed to serve the community of Trenton, Missouri. The station is owned by John Ausberger's PAR Broadcast Group and the broadcast license is held by Luehrs Broadcasting Company, Inc.

It broadcasts an adult contemporary music format deriving a portion of its programming from Dial Global.

The station was assigned the call sign "KTTN" by the Federal Communications Commission (FCC).
