= KCAX =

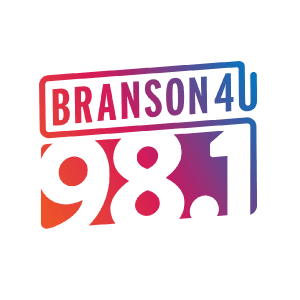
- Branson, Missouri; United States
- Broadcast area: Branson, Missouri
- Frequency: 1220 kHz
- Branding: Classic Hits 98.1FM & AM1220

Programming
- Format: Classic hits

Ownership
- Owner: Mike Huckabee; (Ozark Mountain Media Group, LLC)
- Sister stations: KOMC-FM, KRZK

History
- First air date: 1956
- Former call signs: KBHM (1956–1983); KLCO (1983–1986); KOMC (1986–2016)

Technical information
- Licensing authority: FCC
- Facility ID: 68415
- Class: D
- Power: 1,000 watts (day); 44 watts (night)
- Transmitter coordinates: 36°43′06″N 93°14′20″W
- Translator: 98.1 K251BZ (Branson)

Links
- Public license information: Public file; LMS
- Webcast: Listen live
- Website: branson4u.com

KCAX (1220 AM, "Branson4u.com") is a commercial radio station airing a classic hits format licensed to Branson, Missouri, United States. The station is owned by Mike Huckabee, through licensee Ozark Mountain Media Group, LLC. DBA as Ozarks Dynacom.

== History ==
On October 1, 2016, KOMC dropped its gospel format and began stunting with Christmas music (the first station in the U.S. to do so) under the new KCAX calls. On January 1, 2017, KCAX began a format broadcasting Classic Country to the Branson area.

On July 3, 2017, KCAX changed their format from classic country to classic hits, swapping formats with KRZK 106.3 FM Branson.
