= KCHR (AM) =

Radio station in Charleston, Missouri (1953–2020)

Charleston, Missouri; United States
- Frequency: 1350 kHz

Programming
- Format: Defunct (was oldies)

Ownership
- Owner: South Missouri Broadcasting Company

History
- First air date: 1953

Technical information
- Facility ID: 61145
- Class: D
- Power: 1,000 watts day 79 watts night
- Transmitter coordinates: 36°55′30″N 89°17′45″W

KCHR (1350 AM) was a radio station broadcasting an oldies format. Licensed to Charleston in the U.S. state of Missouri, the station was owned by South Missouri Broadcasting Company. Its license was cancelled January 21, 2020.
