= KPBR (FM) =

- Poplar Bluff, Missouri; United States
- Frequency: 90.3 MHz

Programming
- Format: Christian talk and teaching
- Network: Bott Radio Network

Ownership
- Owner: Community Broadcasting Inc.

History
- First air date: October 9, 1988
- Former call signs: KLUH (1988–2026)

Technical information
- Licensing authority: FCC
- Facility ID: 10999
- Class: C3
- ERP: 25,000 watts
- HAAT: 77 meters (253 ft)
- Transmitter coordinates: 36°43′07″N 90°23′49″W

Links
- Public license information: Public file; LMS
- Website: KPBR page at the Bott Radio Network

KPBR (90.3 FM) is a radio station licensed to Poplar Bluff, Missouri, United States. It is part of the Bott Radio Network and is one of Bott's two transmitters in the city, alongside KLUH (91.7 FM). Until 2026, it was a local Christian radio station with the KLUH call sign.

== History ==
In 1988, Christian Educational Advancement Inc. put this station on the air as KLUH at 90.5 MHz, affiliated with the local Christian school American Christian Academy. The station aired alternating blocks of religious preaching and gospel music and broadcast from a studio on 11th Street. The call sign was derived from Christian symbols, as explained in a poem by founding leader Donald Parsons:

K – is for the King who died on Calvary,
L – is for his Love he gave to you and me.
U – is for Unending joy in our soul,
H – is for Heaven, our last eternal goal.

The station relocated to property on County Road 307 in 1990 and replaced its transmitter facility with a taller 180-foot (55 m) tower and higher power level. In 1995, the station was sold to Victory Communications of Portageville.

In 2025, the Bott Radio Network purchased the 90.3 facility from David Craig Ministries. Bott exchanged the call sign with that of KPBR (91.7 FM) after the change.
