= KRAP =

- Washington, Missouri; United States
- Frequency: 1350 kHz
- Branding: Westplex 107.1

Programming
- Format: Hot adult contemporary
- Affiliations: St. Louis Blues Hockey; Kansas City Chiefs Football

Ownership
- Owner: Computraffic, Inc.
- Sister stations: KSLQ-FM

History
- First air date: 1985 (as KSLQ)
- Former call signs: KSLQ (1984–1998); KWMO (1998–2014)
- Call sign meaning: Humorous reference to the slang term crap

Technical information
- Licensing authority: FCC
- Facility ID: 53522
- Class: D
- Power: 500 watts (daytime); 84 watts (night)
- Transmitter coordinates: 38°34′44.00″N 90°59′57.00″W
- Translator: 107.1 K296HA (Washington)

Links
- Public license information: Public file; LMS
- Webcast: Listen Live
- Website: Westplex 107.1

KRAP (1350 AM) is a radio station licensed to Washington, Missouri.

== Station and programming ==
Originally put on the air by then-owner Ken Kuenzie as KSLQ in 1985, the station changed its callsign to KWMO in July 1998 under the new owner Brad Hildebrand. The station changed its call sign once more on July 28, 2014 to the current KRAP.

KRAP transmits from Warren County about 1 mile (1.6 km) north of the Missouri River and downtown Washington. As a sports station, KRAP featured the CBS Sports Radio Network. KRAP also broadcast local and regional sports play-by-play including St. Louis Blues Hockey, Kansas City Chiefs football as well as high school, college, and minor league sports teams.

On June 24, 2018, KRAP changed formats from sports to hot adult contemporary, branded as "Westplex 107.1" (simulcast on translator K296HA Washington, Missouri).

== Call sign meaning ==
In 2014, the station gave itself the self-aware callsign KRAP, saying on their website: "Our signal is KRAP. Our studios are KRAP. Even our staff is KRAP."
