= KDEX (AM) =

- Dexter, Missouri; United States
- Frequency: 1590 kHz
- Branding: 102.3 FM ~ 1590 AM

Programming
- Format: Classic hits

Ownership
- Owner: Palmer Johnson; (KDEX Inc)
- Sister stations: KDEX-FM

History
- First air date: February 10, 1956 (first license granted)

Technical information
- Licensing authority: FCC
- Facility ID: 16831
- Class: D
- Power: 620 watts day
- Transmitter coordinates: 36°47′20″N 89°54′28″W

Links
- Public license information: Public file; LMS

KDEX (1590 AM) is a radio station broadcasting a country music format, licensed in Dexter, Missouri, United States. The station is currently owned by Palmer Johnson, through licensee KDEX Inc.

In December 2020, Joeli Barbour's Dexter Broadcasting reached an agreement to sell KDEX-AM and KDEX-FM to Palmer Johnson, a Contract Broadcast Engineer from Kennett, MO. On August 30, 2021, KDEX was transferred to KDEX Inc, a corporation 100 percent owned by Palmer Johnson. KDEX Inc immediately changed the format of KDEX-AM to a Classic Hits format. KDEX-AM had been a 100 percent simulcast of co-owned KDEX-FM.
