= KZBK =

Radio station in Brookfield, Missouri

- Brookfield, Missouri; United States
- Frequency: 96.9 MHz
- Branding: Z-96.9

Programming
- Format: Hot adult contemporary

Ownership
- Owner: Best Broadcasting, Inc.
- Sister stations: KFMZ

History
- First air date: August 17, 1981
- Former call signs: KQMO (1981–1985)
- Former frequencies: 97.7 MHz (1981–1995)

Technical information
- Licensing authority: FCC
- Facility ID: 4930
- Class: C2
- ERP: 50,000 watts
- HAAT: 150 meters (490 ft)
- Transmitter coordinates: 39°50′26″N 93°04′49″W

Links
- Public license information: Public file; LMS
- Website: kzbkradio.com

KZBK is a radio station airing a hot adult contemporary format licensed to Brookfield, Missouri, broadcasting on 96.9 FM. The station is owned by Best Broadcasting, Inc.

== History ==
KQMO at 97.7 MHz signed on August 17, 1981, simulcasting sister AM station KGHM during the day and airing its own programming until midnight. Two years later, however, KGHM-KQMO went silent and remained so for a year until the station was sold by Hampro Wireless to Dwight and Carolyn Carver in 1984. The resumption of operations of both stations was delayed into 1985 by FCC requirements. After the sale, both stations changed call letters: KGHM became gospel station KGNG, while KQMO relaunched as KZBK with an adult contemporary format.

Best acquired KGNG-KZBK in 1993. The two stations became KZBK-AM-FM, simulcasting Best flagship KZZT in Moberly. The simulcast of KZZT ended in 1995 when Best completed construction of a new KZBK-FM facility at 96.9 MHz, and the two stations began carrying their own programming.
