= KLMZ =

- Leadwood, Missouri; United States
- Broadcast area: Farmington, Missouri
- Frequency: 107.1 MHz
- Branding: The Zone

Programming
- Format: Active rock
- Affiliations: Fox News Radio; Compass Media Networks; United Stations Radio Networks

Ownership
- Owner: Fred Dockins; (Dockins Communications, Inc.)

History
- First air date: 2010

Technical information
- Licensing authority: FCC
- Facility ID: 170970
- Class: A
- ERP: 820 watts
- HAAT: 215 meters (705 ft)
- Transmitter coordinates: 37°47′55.1″N 90°33′44.4″W

Links
- Public license information: Public file; LMS
- Webcast: Listen live
- Website: thezonerocks.com

KLMZ (107.1 FM) is a radio station licensed to Leadwood, Missouri. The station broadcasts an active rock format and is owned by Fred Dockins, through licensee Dockins Communications, Inc.

Former logo
