= KMMO (AM) =

Simulcasts KMMO-FM Marshall
- Marshall, Missouri; United States
- Frequency: 1300 kHz

Programming
- Format: Country music
- Affiliations: Fox News Radio

Ownership
- Owner: Missouri Valley Broadcasting, Inc.
- Sister stations: KMMO-FM

History
- Call sign meaning: Marshall, Missouri

Technical information
- Licensing authority: FCC
- Facility ID: 43228
- Class: D
- Power: 1,000 watts day 68 watts night
- Transmitter coordinates: 39.1342°N 93.2226°W

Links
- Public license information: Public file; LMS
- Webcast: Listen Live
- Website: kmmo.com

KMMO (1300 kHz) is an AM radio station licensed to Marshall, Missouri. The station broadcasts a country music format and is owned by Missouri Valley Broadcasting, Inc.
