= KUNQ =

- Houston, Missouri; United States
- Broadcast area: West Plains, Missouri; Houston, Missouri; Mountain Grove, Missouri
- Frequency: 99.3 MHz
- Branding: Big Country 99.3 - The Rooster

Programming
- Format: Country music

Ownership
- Owner: Justin Dixon; (Media Professional, LLC)
- Sister stations: KBTC

History
- First air date: May 1965
- Former call signs: KBTC-FM (1965–1972); KSCM-FM (1972–1987)

Technical information
- Licensing authority: FCC
- Facility ID: 65319
- Class: C2
- ERP: 30,000 watts
- HAAT: 184 meters (604 ft)
- Transmitter coordinates: 37°05′21″N 92°03′24″W

Links
- Public license information: Public file; LMS
- Webcast: Listen live
- Website: bigcountry99.com

KUNQ is a radio station airing a country music format licensed to Houston, Missouri, broadcasting on 99.3 FM. The station is owned by Justin Dixon, through licensee Media Professional, LLC.

== History ==
The station signed on in May 1965 as KBTC-FM. It changed its call letters to KSCM-FM on January 22, 1972, and to KUNQ on September 8, 1987.
