= KIRX =

Radio station in Kirksville, Missouri

Coordinates: 40°12′24″N 92°34′31″W

- Kirksville, Missouri; United States
- Frequency: 1450 kHz
- Branding: KIRX 1450 AM 99.7 FM

Programming
- Format: Full Service (local news, sports; 1950s' & 1960s' oldies)
- Affiliations: Fox News Radio; St. Louis Cardinals Radio Network; Associated Press; Missouri Broadcasters Association

Ownership
- Owner: KIRX Incorporated
- Sister stations: KRXL, KTUF

History
- First air date: October 17, 1947
- Call sign meaning: KIR(X)ville (the "x" replaces the k and s)

Technical information
- Licensing authority: FCC
- Facility ID: 34974
- Class: C
- Power: 1,000 watts (AM); 250 watts (FM)
- Translator: 99.7 K259BF (Kirksville)

Links
- Public license information: Public file; LMS
- Website: radioKV

KIRX (1450 AM, "NewsTalk & Good Time Oldies") is a radio station licensed to the city of Kirksville, Missouri and serves the northeast Missouri area.

== History ==
On February 1, 1947, an application for KIRX was filed with the Federal Communications Commission by North Missouri Broadcasting Company, a group consisting of U.S. Congressman Samuel W. Arnold, Sam A. Burk, and Congressman Arnold's son, local businessman Sam M. Arnold. Approval from the FCC was granted on May 1, 1947 to operate KIRX on 1450kc at 250 watts power from a tower height of 150 feet. Office, studio, and tower construction had already begun in anticipation of the authorization, so KIRX was ready to begin broadcasting at noon on October 17, 1947. Until this time the Kirksville area, and indeed much of northeast Missouri, had to rely on radio stations from distant cities such as Des Moines, Iowa, Kansas City, Missouri, and Quincy, Illinois for their broadcast news and entertainment. Most programming was local in origin for the first few years, with the exception of St. Louis Cardinal baseball, which began in 1948. In 1960 KIRX was granted FCC permission to increase its daytime operating power to 1,000 watts, and beginning in 1967 this was broadcast from a new 400-foot tower, increasing the broadcast coverage area. In 1984 KIRX received FCC authorization to operate at full power, 1,000 watts, 24 hours per day. Prior to then, the station was required to power down to 250 watts from sundown to sunrise daily. Also in 1960, the Arnold family divested themselves from North Missouri Broadcast Company, leaving Sam Burk and wife Vera the principal owners, with the new ownership name of Community Broadcasters, Incorporated. Following Sam Burk's death in 1982, his wife Vera continued on as station owner and general manager until 1985 when KIRX and sister station KRXL FM (established in 1967), were sold to an investment group headed by Alvina Britz and David Nelson, dba KIRX Incorporated. On December 1, 2014, KIRX was granted an FCC license to broadcast from an FM frequency of 99.7 MHz from transmitter K259BF. The transmitter, located outside of the Kirksville, MO city limits, has an Effective Radiated Power of 250 watts, allowing the FM signal to only reach as far south as Macon County, MO, and as far north as Schuyler County, MO, about 5 miles south of the Missouri-Iowa Border.

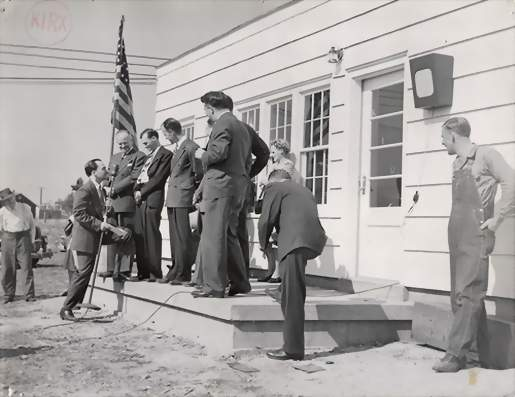
KIRX first day of broadcasting celebration, 10-17-1947.

== Format ==
The early days of KIRX featured many music and interview programs broadcast live from the studios, along with local high school and college sports by remote. One early program that survives to this day is 'Party Line', a 6-day per week call-in show where community members can buy, sell, or trade items. The 'KIRX Barn Dance', broadcast live from Reiger Armory in Kirksville on Saturday nights, was also a popular show. During the 1950s and 1960s most local music programming gave way to the 'stacks of wax', 45's and LP's featuring a wide variety of singers and bands, often left to the discretion of the DJ. The decision was made in 1983 to feature an all-country music format with the slogan "Music Country KIRX". This continued until the late 1990s when the current format of News/Talk with '50s and '60s oldies was initiated. However, as it has since the beginning, local news, high school sports, and St. Louis Cardinals baseball games remain the primary focus.

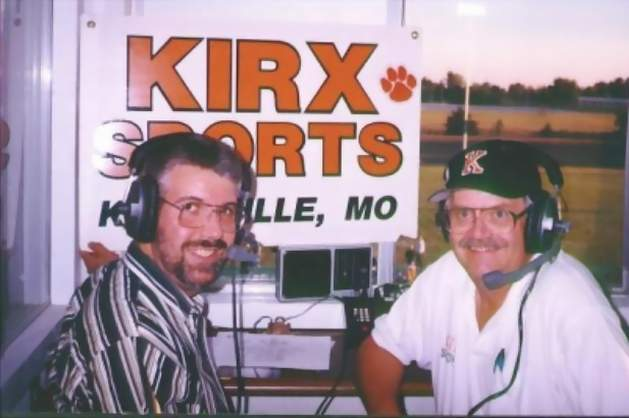
The KIRX Sports team, Steve Eklof (l) and John McConnell (r) broadcasting a Kirksville High School football game, a KIRX tradition for over sixty years.
