= KTUI (AM) =

Coordinates: 38°11′42.00″N 91°11′12.00″W

- Sullivan, Missouri; United States
- Frequency: 1560 kHz

Programming
- Format: Talk radio
- Affiliations: Townhall News

Ownership
- Owner: Dean Brueseke and Robert Scott; (Meramec Area Broadcasting LLC)
- Sister stations: KTUI-FM

History
- First air date: 1966

Technical information
- Licensing authority: FCC
- Facility ID: 41171
- Class: D
- Power: 1,000 watts day 25 watts night
- Translator: 94.1 K231CP (Sullivan)

Links
- Public license information: Public file; LMS
- Webcast: Listen live (via TuneIn)
- Website: atw.nbk.mybluehost.me

KTUI (1560 kHz) is an AM radio station licensed to Sullivan, Missouri, United States. The station airs a Talk radio format and is currently owned by Dean Brueseke and Robert Scott, through licensee Meramec Area Broadcasting LLC.
