= KOMC-FM =

Adult contemporary radio station in Kimberling City, Missouri

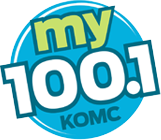
- Kimberling City, Missouri; United States
- Broadcast area: Branson metropolitan area
- Frequency: 100.1 MHz
- Branding: My 100.1

Programming
- Language: English
- Format: Adult contemporary
- Affiliations: Compass Media Networks; Premiere Networks; United Stations Radio Networks

Ownership
- Owner: Paul Coates and Mike Huckabee; (Ozark Mountain Media Group, LLC)
- Sister stations: KRZK; KCAX

History
- First air date: 1992
- Former call signs: KVRV (1990); KZRK (1990–1992); KRLK (1992–1997)
- Call sign meaning: Ozark Mountain Country

Technical information
- Licensing authority: FCC
- Facility ID: 34328
- Class: C2
- ERP: 36,000 watts
- HAAT: 176 meters (577 ft)
- Transmitter coordinates: 36°31′59″N 93°19′44″W

Links
- Public license information: Public file; LMS
- Webcast: Listen live
- Website: www.komc.com

KOMC-FM (100.1 FM, "My 100.1") is a radio station airing an adult contemporary format, licensed to Kimberling City, Missouri, United States. The station serves the areas of Branson, Missouri, Harrison, Arkansas, and Berryville, Arkansas, and is owned by Paul Coates and Mike Huckabee, through licensee Ozark Mountain Media Group, LLC.

KOMC was originally owned by Turtle Broadcasting Company of Branson, a subsidiary of Orr & Earls Broadcasting, Inc. It was added to the lineup of stations originally purchased in 1986. They include KOMC-AM and KRZK-FM which were off the air at the time. Co-principal Roderick Orr sold his interest in the company to Charles Earls in 2004. Earls Broadcasting sold the station to Ozark Mountain Media Group effective December 10, 2018.
