= KDEX-FM =

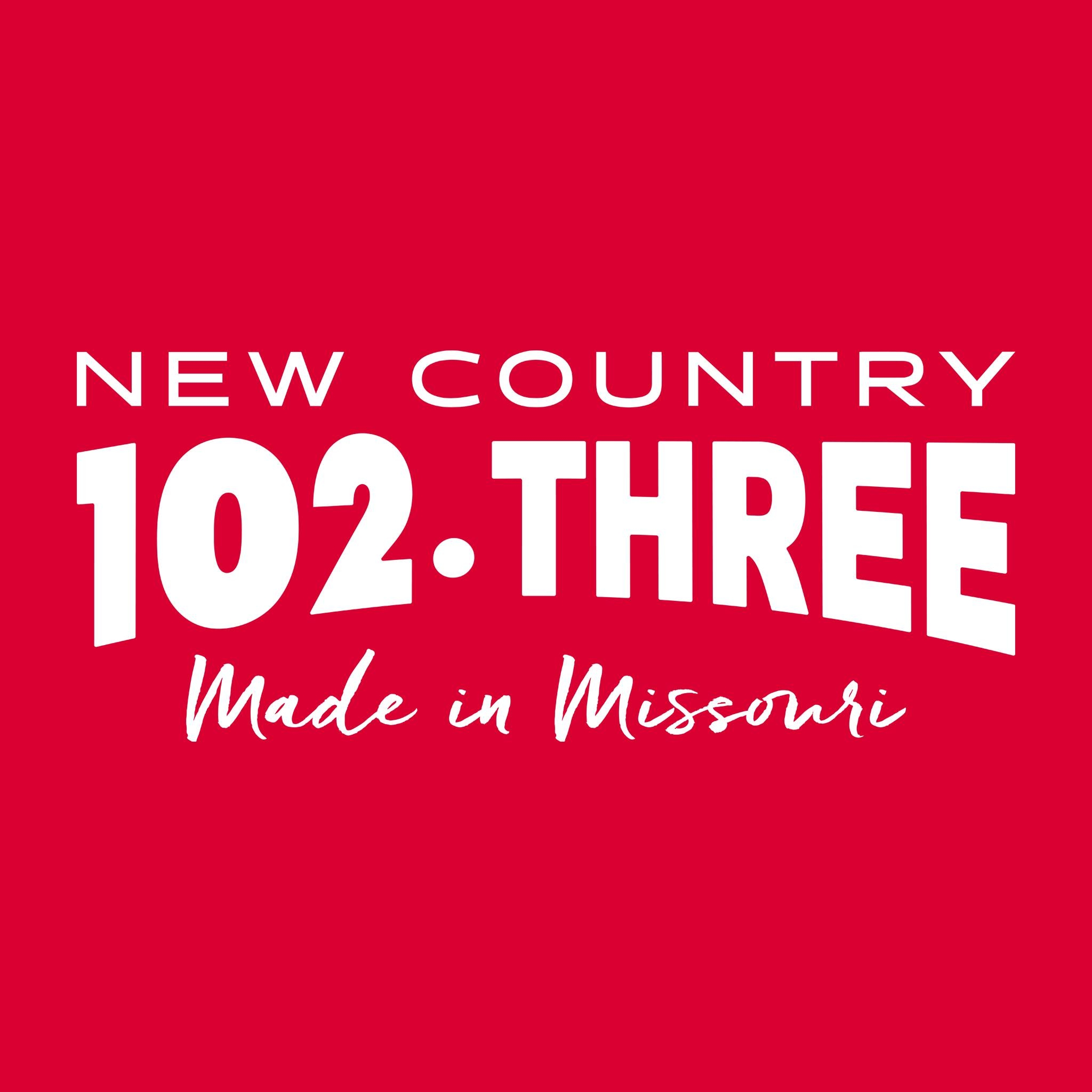
- Dexter, Missouri; United States
- Broadcast area: Malden, Missouri; Sikeston, Missouri
- Frequency: 102.3 MHz

Programming
- Format: Country

Ownership
- Owner: Palmer Johnson; (KDEX Inc)
- Sister stations: KDEX

History
- First air date: January 29, 1969 (first license granted)

Technical information
- Licensing authority: FCC
- Facility ID: 16832
- Class: C3
- ERP: 9,700 watts
- HAAT: 85.0 meters (278.9 ft)
- Transmitter coordinates: 36°47′20″N 89°54′28″W

Links
- Public license information: Public file; LMS

KDEX-FM (102.3 FM) is a radio station broadcasting a country music format, licensed in Dexter, Missouri, United States. The station is currently owned by Palmer Johnson, through license KDEX Inc.

In December 2020, Joeli Barbour's Dexter Broadcasting reached an agreement to sell KDEX-FM and KDEX-AM to Palmer Johnson, a Contract Broadcast Engineer from Kennett, MO. On August 30, 2021 KDEX was transferred to KDEX Inc, a corporation 100 percent owned by Palmer Johnson. KDEX Inc continues to air a modern country format on KDEX-FM. The format of KDEX-AM was changed to a Classic Hits format. KDEX-AM had been a 100 percent simulcast of co-owned KDEX-FM.
