= KMMO-FM =

- Marshall, Missouri; United States
- Frequency: 102.9 MHz
- Branding: Real Radio KMMO

Programming
- Format: Country music
- Affiliations: Fox News Radio

Ownership
- Owner: Missouri Valley Broadcasting, Inc.
- Sister stations: KMMO

History
- Call sign meaning: Marshall, Missouri

Technical information
- Licensing authority: FCC
- Facility ID: 43226
- Class: C1
- ERP: 100,000 watts
- HAAT: 116 meters (381 ft)
- Transmitter coordinates: 39.1364°N 93.2235°W

Links
- Public license information: Public file; LMS
- Webcast: Listen live
- Website: kmmo.com

KMMO-FM (102.9 FM) is a radio station licensed to Marshall, Missouri. The station broadcasts a country music format and is owned by Missouri Valley Broadcasting, Inc.
