= KTTN-FM =

Radio station in Trenton, Missouri

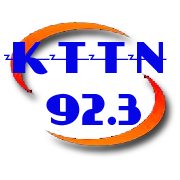
- Trenton, Missouri; United States
- Frequency: 92.3 MHz

Programming
- Language: English
- Format: Classic Country Music

Ownership
- Owner: John Ausberger; (Luehrs Broadcasting Company, Inc.)
- Sister stations: KGOZ, KTTN

History
- Former call signs: KiTTeN
- Former frequencies: 92.1 MHz
- Call sign meaning: TrenToN

Technical information
- Licensing authority: FCC
- Facility ID: 39166
- Class: C3
- Power: 18,500 watts
- HAAT: 116 meters (381 ft)
- Transmitter coordinates: 40°05′00″N 93°33′30″W

Links
- Public license information: Public file; LMS
- Website: kttn.com

KTTN-FM (92.3 FM) is part of a three-station group of radio stations based out of Trenton, Missouri, and owned by John Ausberger. KTTN FM 92.3, KTTN AM 1600, and Hot Country KGOZ Z 101.7 FM offer a varying musical range, with KTTN-FM featuring classic country music from Nashville's early years. The three stations together are known as the PAR Broadcast Group.

KTTN features a long-running "Birthday and Anniversary" show that offers listeners a chance to wish their friends and loved ones best wishes live on the air Monday through Saturday mornings. Newscasts from reporters John Anthony and Jennifer Thies air six times per day. Sportscasts air three times per day. KTTN airs University of Missouri football and men's basketball games and many local and area high school sporting events, including those of the Princeton Tigers, Milan Wildcats, and Trenton Bulldogs. Other popular programs include "Southern Gospel Jubilee" with Tom Veatch three days a week and the "Trading Post," airing five days a week.

KTTN AM signed on the air on April 17, 1955. Sam Burk, a highly regarded broadcaster from Kirksville, was the first owner. Bill Hundley, who very popular and comrnunity minded, was the station's manager for the first six years. When he bought his own radio station in Kansas, Burke sold KTTN to Clarence Breazeal, the assistant general manager of KCMO, number one in the Kansas City market.

Breazeal was at KCMO when they signed on both the radio and TV station. He owned and managed KTTN for the next seven years until his retirement.

Marvin Luehrs, Everett Wenrick, and Judge Harold Fleck, previous owners of WJIL in Jacksonville, Illinois, purchased KTTN in 1968. Luehrs had been a previous manager, district manager, and divisional manager in the Bell System before eventually managing WJIL. He subsequently managed KTTN for the next 24-years. In 1979, he was elected to Trenton's Hall of Fame.

KTTN FM became a reality on September 15, 1978. Over two acres of land was purchased three miles east of the station's downtown studios, where the transmitter site and towers were located. New Harris equipment was purchased, and a consultant from Illinois was hired for onsite installation.

Judge Harold Fleck died in 1983, and at which time Luehrs and Wenrick bought his stock and sold 10 percent interest in the station to Michael Ransdell, then Operations Manager at KTTN. When Luehrs semi-retired in 1988, Ransdell was appointed general manager. When Ransdell announced he would change careers in 1990, the stockholders decided to sell the station.

Effective August 1992, KTTN AM and FM was purchased by a trio of local owners, John Anthony Ausberger, Timothy Peery, and Michael Ransdell. Anthony had been a long-time employee and Ransdell returned to KTTN employment in May 1993.

In January 2002, John Anthony Ausberger became the sole owner of KTTN AM and FM and continues to work in the dual capacity of general manager and news director.

Current Full-Time Employees as of January 2021:

John Anthony: Owner

Carol Anthony: Owner

Randall Mann: Chief Engineer, Social Media Manager and Webmaster

Tom Johnson: Sports Director

Jennifer Thies: News Reporter

Betty Schultz: Sales
