= KBTC (AM) =

- Houston, Missouri; United States
- Frequency: 1250 kHz

Programming
- Format: Christian talk and teaching
- Affiliations: American Family Radio

Ownership
- Owner: Justin Dixon; (Media Professional, LLC)
- Sister stations: KUNQ

History
- First air date: June 28, 1962

Technical information
- Licensing authority: FCC
- Facility ID: 65317
- Class: D
- Power: 980 watts (day); 50 watts (night)
- Transmitter coordinates: 37°19′45″N 91°53′55″W
- Translator: 105.7 K289CK (Houston)

Links
- Public license information: Public file; LMS

KBTC (1250 AM) is a radio station licensed to serve Houston, Missouri, United States. The station, established in 1962, is currently owned by Justin Dixon, through licensee Media Professional, LLC.

== History ==
KBTC first signed on the air on June 28, 1962, broadcasting on the 1250 kHz frequency, licensed to serve Houston, Missouri. It operates as a Class D station, broadcasting with a daytime power of 980 watts and a nighttime power of 50 watts. Current ownership is held by Media Professional, LLC, headed by Justin Dixon.

KBTC currently broadcasts a Religious Talk and Teaching format as an affiliate of the American Family Radio (AFR) network, a division of the American Family Association. The AFR programming features a variety of nationally syndicated Christian talk, news, and teaching programs. For a period in its recent history, the station aired a Sports format, affiliated with ESPN Radio, and was locally branded as "ESPN 1250 Houston." The station is simulcast on an FM translator, K289CK (105.7 FM), to provide an improved local signal to the Houston area.

The station's logo carrying ESPN programming.
