= KXBR (Missouri) =

Radio station in Greenfield, Missouri (1974–1990)

- Greenfield, Missouri; United States
- Frequency: 93.5 MHz

Programming
- Format: Album-oriented rock

History
- First air date: March 1974
- Last air date: 1990
- Former call signs: KRFG (1974–1984); KORX (1984–1987)

Technical information
- Facility ID: 35924
- Class: A
- ERP: 1.3 kW
- HAAT: 140.589 m (461.25 ft)
- Transmitter coordinates: 37°22′19″N 93°42′33″W

KXBR was a radio station in the Missouri Ozarks. The station was licensed to Greenfield, Missouri, United States, and broadcast at 93.5 MHz from 1974 to 1990. It primarily served the Springfield area with a rock format. However, it failed twice due to financial difficulties, the second time after a lease dispute with a landowner resulted in a verdict against the station.

== History ==
On June 1, 1973, the Watkins Investment Company filed an application with the Federal Communications Commission (FCC) to build a new radio station in Greenfield, which was granted on November 13, 1973. It signed on in March 1974 as KRFG "Radio Free Greenfield", broadcasting with 2.35 kW effective radiated power from a transmitter 2.7 miles (4.3 km) outside of Greenfield. In October 1976, it began being broadcast on 10-watt translator K296AS at 107.1 MHz transmitting from atop the Sunvilla Tower on the campus of Southwest Missouri State University in Springfield, owned by attorney Kent Wooldridge; the station was already being rebroadcast into the Stockton area. As KRFG, the station had a mixed format with album-oriented rock programs during the evening but lighter fare during the day, as well as local high school and Missouri Tigers football. In 1981, Watkins attempted to obtain permission to move the station to Springfield proper, which was denied by the FCC the next year.

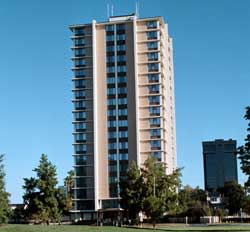
Beginning in 1976, Sunvilla Tower housed a translator for KRFG.

In 1984, the Mach Broadcasting Company acquired KRFG for $165,000. Mach was owned by Mark Allen, a former radio announcer in Denver and Springfield. The station's call sign changed to KORX upon closure of the sale, though the format remained rock. A year later, Mach sold KORX to Burkett H. and Elizabeth Wamsley, doing business as Coppertone Communications, for $300,000. Coppertone also owned KCKX in Stayton, Oregon. Watkins would later sue Allen and the Wamsleys.

On July 15, 1986, KORX went off the air, and Coppertone announced it would file for bankruptcy liquidation; the Wamsleys had invested in a studio in Springfield but were unable to shake the hard rock image that KRFG had originally cultivated, losing their life savings in the process. Founding owner Watkins had sued Allen for $120,000 owed on a promissory note, money Allen was to receive from Coppertone; when the station was taken out of service, Watkins expanded the suit to include Coppertone as a defendant, seeking recovery of station equipment.

While the station was not off the air long, and a buyer surfaced for the station in August, no deal was consummated. Federal receiver Johnie Jones was appointed to manage operations and seek a buyer; he filed to relocate the station to a new facility closer to Springfield and ran it by using students from a broadcasting school he owned as well as volunteers. Christopher Devine's Devine Communications alongside stations in Utah, New Mexico and New York, acquired the station for $250,000; at the stroke of midnight on January 1, 1988, the station changed call signs from KORX to KXBR.

The new call sign ushered in an era of technical and financial difficulties. In March, the station went off the air to relocate its transmitter to the east, near Everton, and lost the 107.1 translator to a simulcast of KKUZ in Joplin. KXBR went off the air again at the end of September to complete the move; days later, the station was robbed, with thieves stealing cassette players, a stereo receiver, and other radio and office equipment.

KXBR completed construction on the facility on February 2, 1989. However, the station's payment problems continued. In June, an outdoor advertising company with which the station had done business painted a billboard reading "KXBR does not pay their bills, beware of rubber checks"; construction companies that had built the transmitter facility also were owed money. On July 9, 1989, landlord Lois DeClue, claiming the station was four months behind on its lease payments, used a bulldozer to block the transmitter shed with large tree trunks, then buried the building under six feet of earth. The station was able to obtain a restraining order from a local judge and resumed operations the next day. A week later, however, the restraining order was dissolved, and KXBR's operations manager was arrested for stopping a $900 payment for the installation of an antenna on the station's studio-transmitter link tower. In February 1990, a court ruled KXBR had to pay DeClue $25,000 in punitive damages—doubled to $50,000 by state statute—and vacate her property, with the station ceasing broadcasts sometime thereafter, in the spring of 1990.

The license remained active for several more years; the station filed later in 1990 to relocate its tower. In February 1993, the station was successful in its petition to be relocated to 107.7 MHz. However, the facility was deleted on April 6, 1994.
