= KTUI-FM =

U.S. radio station in Sullivan, Missouri

- Sullivan, Missouri; United States
- Frequency: 102.1 MHz

Programming
- Format: Country music
- Affiliations: SRN News

Ownership
- Owner: Dean Brueseke and Robert Scott; (Meramec Area Broadcasting LLC)
- Sister stations: KTUI-AM

Technical information
- Licensing authority: FCC
- Facility ID: 22180
- Class: A
- ERP: 6,000 watts
- HAAT: 84 meters (276 ft)
- Transmitter coordinates: 38.195056°N 91.186806°W

Links
- Public license information: Public file; LMS

KTUI-FM (102.1 FM) is a radio station licensed to Sullivan, Missouri, United States, and owned by Meramec Area Broadcasting LLC.

KTUI-FM and sister station KTUI were purchased by Fidelity Broadcasting in 1997. On March 9, 2008, KTUI 100.9 FM switched frequencies to 102.1 FM. The radio stations' coverage areas in Missouri reach from St. James on the west to Pacific on the east, and New Haven on the north to Potosi on the south, covering several hundred square miles around the state. The FM station plays a mix of new and old country music, while the AM station enlightens listeners with talk radio.

Effective March 31, 2020, Fidelity Broadcasting sold KTUI-FM and KTUI to Meramec Area Broadcasting LLC for $200,000.

KTUI-FM is a member of the St. Louis Cardinals Radio Network.
