= KPOW-FM =

- La Monte, Missouri; United States
- Broadcast area: Sedalia, Missouri
- Frequency: 97.7 MHz
- Branding: KPOW-FM Power 97.7

Programming
- Format: Classic hits

Ownership
- Owner: Benne Media; (Sedalia Investment Group LLC)
- Sister stations: KDRO

History
- First air date: 1983
- Call sign meaning: K POWer

Technical information
- Licensing authority: FCC
- Facility ID: 78321
- Class: C1
- ERP: 100,000 watts
- HAAT: 299 meters (982 feet)
- Transmitter coordinates: 39°03′10″N 93°16′01″W

Links
- Public license information: Public file; LMS
- Website: power977.com

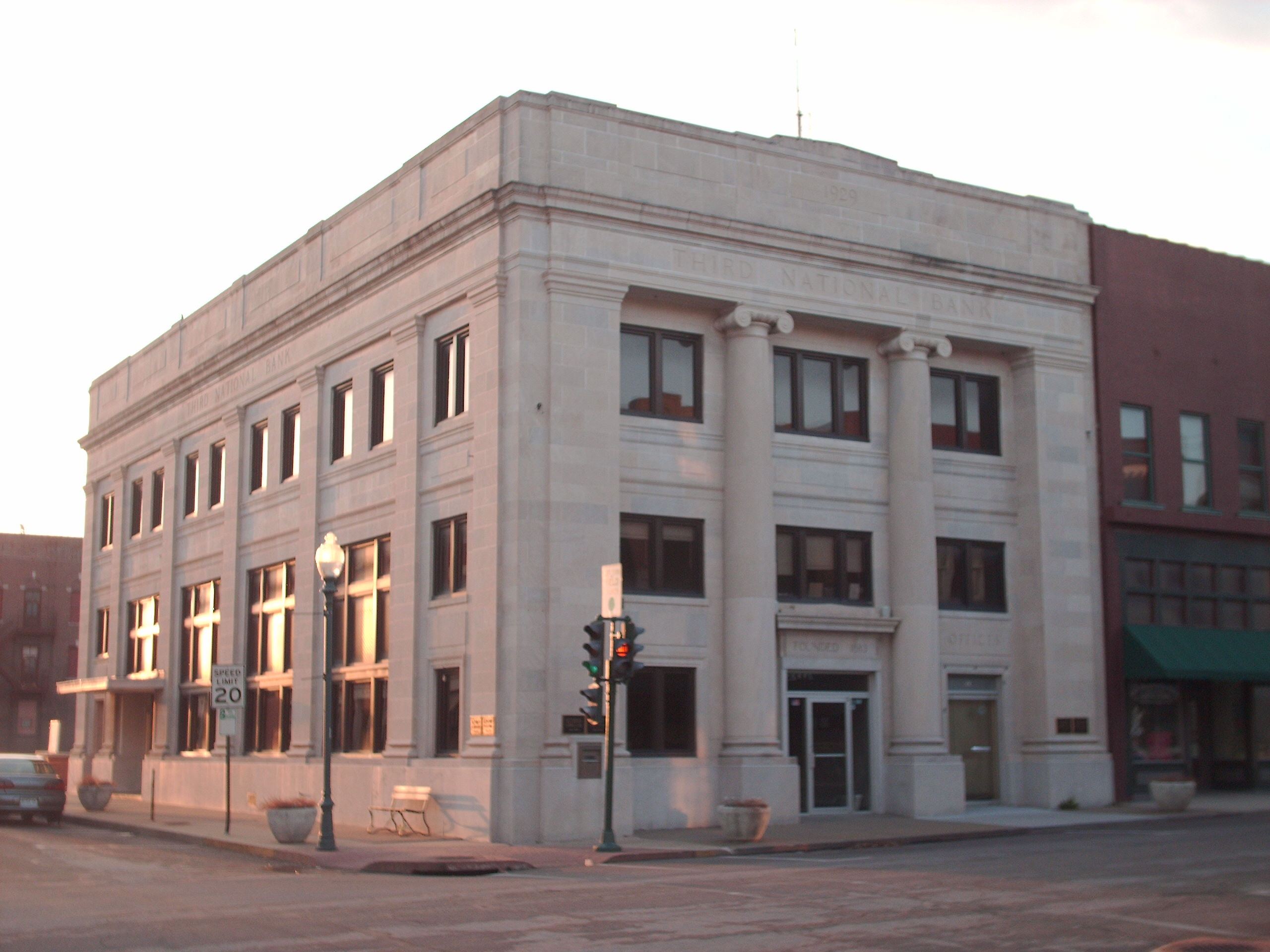
KDRO/KPOW Studios located at 301 South Ohio Avenue in Sedalia, the former Third National Bank

KPOW-FM (97.7 FM) is a radio station broadcasting a classic hits music format. Licensed to La Monte, Missouri, United States. The station is owned by Benne Media.

The station was originally at 97.1 FM. In 2002, the station moved to 97.7 FM as part of a shuffle to allow 97.3 FM KLRX to move into the Kansas City market.
