= KMCR (FM) =

Radio station in Montgomery City, Missouri

Coordinates: 38°59′10″N 91°30′39″W

- Montgomery City, Missouri; United States
- Frequency: 103.9 MHz
- Branding: KMCR Radio 103.9 FM

Programming
- Format: Adult contemporary

Ownership
- Owner: Chirillo Electronics, Inc.

History
- First air date: August 15, 1977 (as KVCM)
- Former call signs: KVCM (1977–1986); KOMC (1986)
- Call sign meaning: Montgomery City Radio

Technical information
- Licensing authority: FCC
- Facility ID: 10853
- Class: A
- ERP: 6,000 watts
- HAAT: 91 meters (299 ft)

Links
- Public license information: Public file; LMS
- Website: kmcrradio.com

KMCR 103.9 FM is a radio station licensed to Montgomery City, Missouri. The station broadcasts an adult contemporary format and is owned by Chirillo Electronics, Inc.

== History ==
The station began broadcasting August 15, 1977, and originally held the call sign KVCM. It was originally owned by Montgomery County Broadcasting Company. In 1981, the station was sold to Montgomery Media, Inc. for 160,000. On May 28, 1986, its call sign was changed to KOMC and on December 12, 1986 it was changed to KMCR. The station aired a country music format in the 1980s and early 1990s.

In 1993, the station adopted an adult contemporary format. In 1994, the station was sold to Chirillo Electronics for $40,000.
