= Mass media in Quincy, Illinois =

This is a list of media services in Quincy, Illinois/Hannibal, Missouri/Keokuk, Iowa market.

== Television ==
Television stations in the Quincy-Hannibal area
Call letters	Channel	Description
KHQA-TV	7	CBS affiliate
KHQA-DT2	7.2	ABC affiliate
KHQA-DT3	7.3	Comet affiliate
KHQA-DT4	7.4	TBD affiliate
WGEM-TV	10	NBC affiliate
WGEM-DT2	10.2	CW affiliate
WGEM-DT3	10.3	Fox affiliate
WGEM-DT4	10.4	MeTV affiliate
WTJR	16	CTN affiliate; airs some locally produced programs.
WMEC	22	PBS member station; satellite of WSEC channel 14 Jacksonville/Springfield, Illinois; licensed to Macomb
WQEC	27	PBS member station; satellite of WSEC channel 14 Jacksonville/Springfield, Illinois; licensed to Quincy

== Received radio stations ==
=== FM stations ===
FM radio stations
Frequency	Call sign	Name	Format	Owner	City
88.5 FM	WGCA	WGCA: The Mix	Contemporary Christian Music	Great Commission Broadcasting	Quincy, Illinois
89.3 FM	WIPA	WIUS 91.9	Public Radio NPR	University of Illinois Springfield	Pittsfield, Illinois
89.5 FM	WIUW	Tri States Public Radio	Public Radio NPR	Western Illinois University	Warsaw, Illinois
90.3 FM	WQUB	Quincy Public Radio	Public Radio NPR	University of Missouri–St. Louis	Quincy, Illinois
91.3 FM	WIUM	Tri States Public Radio	Public Radio NPR	Western Illinois University	Macomb, Illinois
91.7 FM	KJIR	The Tri-States' Southern Gospel	Gospel	Believers Broadcasting Corporation	Quincy, Illinois
92.9 FM	KGRC	Real 92-9	Top 40	STARadio Corporation	Hannibal, Missouri
94.5 FM	KRXL	The X	Classic rock	Kirx, Inc	Kirksville, Missouri
95.3 FM	KQKL	K-Love	Contemporary Christian	Educational Media Foundation	Keokuk, Iowa
96.3 FM	KRNQ	Bott Radio Network	Religious	Bott Radio Network	Keokuk, Iowa
96.9 FM	KHBL	KHBL 96.9 FM	Adult Variety	KHBL	Hannibal, Missouri
97.9 FM	KICK	Kick FM!	Country	Townsquare Media	Palmyra, Missouri
99.5 FM	WCOY	Coyote Country	Country	STARadio Corporation	Quincy, Illinois
100.9 FM	KRRY	Y101	Hot AC	Townsquare Media	Canton, Missouri
102.5 FM	KQPW	The Power	Silent	Private owner	West Quincy, Missouri
102.9 FM	WQIN	Unknown	Gospel	3ABN	Quincy, Illinois
103.9 FM	WQCY	Q104	Adult Contemporary	STARadio Corporation	Quincy, Illinois
104.3 FM	KVMO	V104.3	Adult Album Alternative	Private Owner	Vandalia, Missouri
105.1 FM	WGEM	WGEM on FM	Community radio	Quincy Newspapers	Quincy, Illinois
105.9 FM	KZZK	The Grizz	Rock	STARadio Corporation	New London, Missouri
106.7 FM	WPWQ	Q106	Oldies (1960s–1970s)	WPX Broadcasting	Mount Sterling, Illinois
107.9 FM	WQJC	Quincy's Jazz Channel	Smooth Jazz	Quincy Not For Profit Jazz	Quincy, Illinois

=== AM stations ===
AM radio stations
Frequency	Call sign	Name	Format	Owner	City
930 AM	WTAD	Talk Radio 930	News/Talk	STARadio Corporation	Quincy, Illinois
1070 AM	KHMO	KHMO	Talk	TownSquare Media	Hannibal, Missouri
1530 AM	WLIQ	KICK AM	Classic Country	TownSquare Media	Quincy, Illinois

=== Weatherband ===
Weatherband stations
Frequency	Call sign	Name	Owner	City
162.475	WXK82	WXK 82	NOAA	Hannibal, Missouri

== Periodicals ==
- Arts/Quincy – distributed and printed by the Quincy Society of Fine Arts; a black and white news article published every week about the culture, history, and art of Quincy
- Quincy Herald-Whig – the major newspaper in the region, printed by Quincy Newspapers and shipped throughout much of the Tri-State region
- Quincy Rhythm

== Web ==
- Quincy Journal – established in 2011 and published by STARadio Corporation; provides online local, political and business news for Quincy and the surrounding area
- QuincyNews.org – established in 2008 and published by Quincy Home Page, Inc.; an independent community driven news resource that provides online local, regional and business news for Quincy and Adams County
