= KRRY =

- Canton, Missouri; United States
- Broadcast area: Quincy, Illinois; Hannibal, Missouri
- Frequency: 100.9 MHz
- Branding: 100.9 The Eagle

Programming
- Format: Classic rock
- Affiliations: Compass Media Networks

Ownership
- Owner: Townsquare Media; (Townsquare License, LLC)
- Sister stations: KHMO, KICK-FM, WLIQ

History
- First air date: May 4, 1971 (as KQCA)
- Former call signs: KQCA (1971–1989); KBXB (1989–1995)

Technical information
- Licensing authority: FCC
- Facility ID: 6807
- Class: C2
- ERP: 28,000 watts
- HAAT: 200 meters (656 feet)

Links
- Public license information: Public file; LMS
- Webcast: Listen Live
- Website: 101theeagle.com

KRRY (100.9 FM) is a radio station licensed to serve Canton, Missouri, United States. The station is owned by Townsquare Media.

It broadcasts a classic rock music format to the greater Quincy, Illinois, and Hannibal, Missouri, area.

== History ==
In January 1989, Lewis and Clark Broadcasting, Inc., reached an agreement to sell KQCA to Bick Broadcasting Company. The deal was approved by the Federal Communications Commission on February 22, 1989, and the transaction was consummated on March 3, 1989.

The new owners requested that the FCC change the station's callsign to KBXB on September 21, 1989. The station changed its callsign to the current KRRY on September 1, 1995.

In May 2006, Bick Broadcasting Company reached an agreement to sell KRRY to Double O Radio. The deal was approved by the FCC on June 30, and the transaction was consummated on August 31.

On May 1, 2017, KRRY changed its slogan to "The Tri-States Biggest Variety", as well as updating the station's old logo as it transitioned from Top 40/CHR to Hot Adult Contemporary (KGRC "Real 92.9" continues to air a Top 40/CHR format to this day).

On May 27, 2021, KRRY abruptly dropped their longtime CHR/Hot AC format and flipped to classic rock as "100.9 The Eagle". The change came with very little public warning beforehand, to the point that the change was marked simply by the station segueing from "Don't Start Now" by Dua Lipa straight into "Walk This Way" by Aerosmith; the station also launched with the announcement of a countdown of the top 500 classic rock songs to start the following day, the 28th, and extending through that upcoming Memorial Day weekend. The change was also triggered by the retirement of morning host Jeff "The Big Dog" Dorsey, who had served as a DJ for the station since 2001, and had a career in the Quincy-Hannibal radio market (including stops at WGEM, WTAD, and WQCY-FM) since 1978. Dorsey’s co-host Sarah Deien has also exited. Dorsey later told the Muddy River News that he was notified of the change the previous Tuesday and that, while he would have preferred to choose the date himself, he was grateful that Townsquare allowed him his own personal signoff before the change, a move rather uncommon with many radio stations.

== Former logo ==
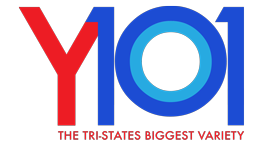

== See also ==
- List of media outlets in Quincy, Illinois
