= KZZK =

- New London, Missouri; United States
- Broadcast area: Quincy, Illinois; Hannibal, Missouri
- Frequency: 105.9 MHz
- Branding: 105.9 The Grizz

Programming
- Format: Mainstream rock
- Affiliations: Westwood One

Ownership
- Owner: STARadio Corporation
- Sister stations: KGRC, WCOY, WQCY, WTAD

History
- First air date: 1996
- Former call signs: KAJJ (1994–1995, CP); KLSN (1995–1996, CP)

Technical information
- Licensing authority: FCC
- Facility ID: 53663
- Class: C3
- ERP: 10,000 watts
- HAAT: 157 meters (515 ft)
- Transmitter coordinates: type:city 39°43′48.00″N 91°24′19.00″W

Links
- Public license information: Public file; LMS
- Webcast: Listen Live
- Website: kzzk.com

KZZK (105.9 FM) is a regional mainstream rock radio station in the Quincy, Illinois Region owned by STARadio Corporation. As with most STARadio stations the studio is in Quincy, but the transmitter is in Missouri; the KZZK transmitter is located in New London, Missouri.

== See also ==
- Media in Quincy, Illinois
