= KIKF =

- Cascade, Montana; United States
- Broadcast area: Great Falls, Montana
- Frequency: 104.9 MHz

Programming
- Format: Country music

Ownership
- Owner: STARadio Corporation
- Sister stations: KXGF, KIMO, KQDI, KQDI-FM

Technical information
- Licensing authority: FCC
- Facility ID: 22280
- Class: C
- ERP: 94,000 watts
- HAAT: 621.0 meters
- Transmitter coordinates: 47°9′34″N 111°0′39″W
- Translators: K277BK (103.3 MHz, Black Eagle)

Links
- Public license information: Public file; LMS
- Website: 104.9 The Wolf

KIKF (104.9 FM) is a radio station broadcasting a country music format. Licensed to Cascade, Montana, United States, the station serves the Great Falls area. The station is currently owned by STARadio Corporation.
