= WGEM =

WGEM may refer to:

- WGEM-FM, a radio station (105.1 FM) licensed to Quincy, Illinois, United States
- WGEM-TV, a television station (channel 10) licensed to Quincy, Illinois
- WGEM (AM), a defunct radio station (1440 AM) formerly licensed to Quincy, Illinois
