= Rick Weaver =

American sports announcer (1926–2000)

- Born: Richard Eugene Weaver; November 26, 1926; Fort Wayne, Indiana, U.S.
- Died: August 5, 2000 (aged 73); Grosse Pointe Farms, Michigan, U.S.
- Occupation: Miami Dolphins radio announcer
- Years active: 1946–1993
- Spouse: Bobbie Leon Richardson (m. 1948; died 1991) Joan Hoskin (m. 1993)

Richard Eugene Weaver (November 26, 1926 – August 5, 2000) was an American sports announcer who was the play-by-play announcer for the Miami Dolphins from 1971 to 1993.

== Early life ==
Weaver was born in Fort Wayne, Indiana and grew up in Toledo, Ohio. His father, Everett Weaver, was an organizer for John L. Lewis and the United Mine Workers of America. Weaver attended DeVilbiss High School, where he played football and baseball. He also worked at WTOL, which had a program for high school students. After high school, Weaver served in the United States Marine Corps.

== Career ==
After leaving the military, pursued a baseball career, but an injury forced him to change his plans. He found a job at a radio station in Columbus, Mississippi. He worked four days a week as a morning deejay and called play-by-play for Ole Miss Rebels football. While there, he married Bobbie Leon Richardson. Weaver then had brief stints with WCAV in Norfolk, Virginia (1948), WHSY in Hattiesburg, Mississippi (1949), WPDQ in Jacksonville, Florida (1949–50), WIOU in Kokomo, Indiana (1950–1951), WXGI in Richmond, Virginia (1951), WCEN in Mount Pleasant, Michigan (1951–1953), WGEM/WGEM-FM/WGEM-TV in Quincy, Illinois (1953–55), and KLIN and KOLN-TV in Lincoln, Nebraska (1955–56).

From 1956 to 1965, Weaver was the sports director of KFH in Wichita, Kansas. He was the play-by-play announcer for high school and Wichita State Shockers sports. In 1963, Weaver also called Dallas Cowboys games on KLIF, but station owner Gordon McLendon let him go after he chartered a flight from a Wichita State game to a Cowboys away game at the expense of the team.

In 1965, Weaver joined WBBM in Chicago, where he called Big Ten football and Chicago Blackhawks hockey games and was also contributor to CBS Radio's national sports coverage. He then worked for KGO in San Francisco, where he was part of the broadcast teams for the San Francisco 49ers and California Golden Seals.

In 1971, Weaver joined WIOD in Miami as sports director and play-by-play announcer for the Miami Dolphins. He was with the team during its undefeated 1972 season and called five Super Bowls. He won Florida Sportscaster of the Year ten times. He retired after the 1993 season.

== Later life ==
Weaver's wife suffered a stroke that confined her to a wheelchair for the final decade of her life. She died in 1991 and Weaver moved to Okolona, Mississippi to be near her burial site. In 1993, Weaver married Joan Hoskin of Grosse Pointe Farms, Michigan, whom he met while visiting his brother, Joe Weaver, a Detroit news anchor. Weaver spent his final years in Grosse Pointe Farms, where he died from colorectal cancer on August 5, 2000. Funeral services were held in Miami and he was buried in Okolona.
