= KQDI =

KQDI may refer to:

- KQDI (AM), a radio station (1450 AM) licensed to Great Falls, Montana, United States
- KQDI-FM, a radio station (106.1 FM) licensed to Highwood, Montana, United States
