= KHQA-TV =

Television station in Hannibal, Missouri

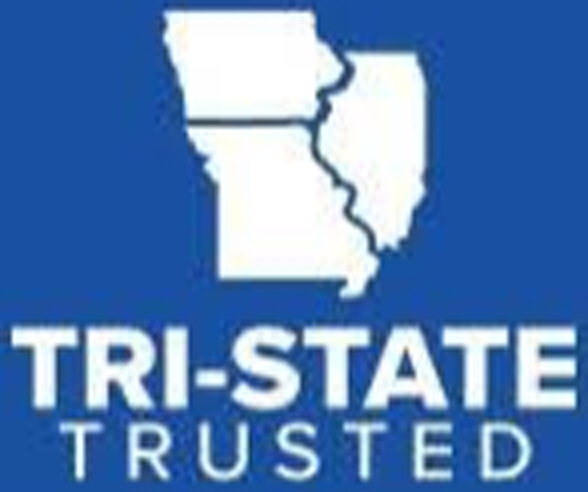
- Hannibal, Missouri; Quincy, Illinois; Keokuk, Iowa; United States
- City: Hannibal, Missouri
- Channels: Digital: 22 (UHF); Virtual: 7
- Branding: KHQA; Tri-State Trusted News; KHQA CBS (7.1); KHQA ABC (7.2)

Programming
- Affiliations: 7.1: CBS; 7.2: ABC; for others, see § Subchannels

Ownership
- Owner: Standard Media; (Community News Media LLC)
- Sister stations: KTVO (joint news operation)

History
- First air date: September 23, 1953
- Former call signs: KHMO-TV (CP, February 18, 1953–April 23, 1953)
- Former channel numbers: Analog: 7 (VHF, 1953–2009); Digital: 29 (UHF, 2001–2009), 7 (VHF, 2009–2024)
- Former affiliations: All secondary: DuMont (1953–1955); ABC (1960–1969); UPN (1995–2006)
- Call sign meaning: Keokuk Hannibal Quincy Area

Technical information
- Licensing authority: FCC
- Facility ID: 4690
- ERP: 750 kW
- HAAT: 271 m (889 ft)
- Transmitter coordinates: 39°58′22″N 91°19′55″W

Links
- Public license information: Public file; LMS
- Website: khqa.com

KHQA-TV (channel 7) is a television station licensed to Hannibal, Missouri, United States, serving the Quincy, Illinois–Hannibal, Missouri–Keokuk, Iowa market as an affiliate of CBS and ABC. The station is owned by Standard Media, and maintains studios on South 36th Street in Quincy; its transmitter is located northeast of the city on Cannonball Road near I-172.

== History ==
KHQA went on-the-air September 23, 1953. The station was originally owned by Lee Enterprises of Davenport, Iowa, along with the Hannibal Courier-Post and WTAD radio (930 AM and 99.5 FM, now WCOY). Despite the common ownership, Lee was unable to use the WTAD-TV calls because Federal Communications Commission (FCC) rules of the time did not allow stations to share common base callsigns if they were licensed in different cities. While licensed to Hannibal (hence accounting for the "H" in its callsign, as well as its callsign beginning with a "K"), its studios have long been located across the Mississippi River in Quincy; the station signed on after the FCC allowed a station to base its main studio outside its city of license.

Channel 7 received its DuMont transmitters on July 27, 1953. They arrived on the same truck as the transmitters for future rival WGEM-TV (channel 10). The two stations' crews raced to be the first television station in the Tri-State. Ultimately, WGEM-TV won the race, signing on September 4, more than two weeks before channel 7.

KHQA has always been a primary CBS affiliate, although it had a secondary affiliation with DuMont between 1953 and 1956. The station shared a secondary ABC affiliation with WGEM-TV in the 1960s. KHQA also aired a number of UPN programs during late-night hours between 1995 and 2006. Lee sold the Courier-Post in 1969, but held onto its Quincy broadcasting cluster until December 1986 when the company sold KHQA to A. Richard Benedek, whose television holdings eventually became Benedek Broadcasting. The radio stations were sold to Eastern Broadcasting. Lee earned a handsome return on its purchase of WTAD radio in 1944. At the time of the sale, KHQA was the smallest station in Lee's TV portfolio.

Benedek declared bankruptcy and sold most of its stations to Gray Television in 2002, but KHQA was sold to Chelsey Broadcasting; Gray would ultimately acquire Quincy Media, parent company of WGEM AM–FM–TV, in 2021. KHQA, WHOI in Peoria, and WEYI-TV in Saginaw, Michigan, became the first three stations owned by the newly formed Barrington Broadcasting in April 2004. In early 1998, KHQA left its longtime home in the Western Catholic Union building in downtown Quincy. The station moved into a new state-of-the-art facility located on South 36th Street. On August 28, 2007, KHQA announced that a new second digital subchannel would begin carrying ABC for the Tri-States, replacing sister station KTVO (which had been ABC's affiliate of record in the Quincy market). This was launched on September 30.

On February 28, 2013, Barrington announced that it would exit from broadcasting and sell off its entire group, including KHQA-TV, to Sinclair Broadcast Group. The sale was completed on November 25.

On February 26, 2020, it was revealed that KHQA would undergo the same transition as Sinclair sister stations WNWO-TV in Toledo, Ohio, and WOLF-TV in Scranton, Pennsylvania, having their newscasts hubbed by another station. News management, production, and anchors would be moved to WICD in Champaign, Illinois. Weather and some reporters would be allowed to stay local, with an unspecified number of other employees allowed to move to Champaign. These changes went into effect later in the year.

On November 7, 2024, it was announced that KTVO and KHQA would merge their news departments into a new operation called Tri-State Trusted, which would cover both the Ottumwa–Kirksville and Quincy–Hannibal–Keokuk markets. Newscasts would originate from the KTVO studios but also feature local content produced by KHQA. The new operation launched with the morning newscast on December 9.

On March 11, 2025, it was reported that Sinclair would sell five TV stations, including KHQA and KTVO, to Rincon Broadcasting Group, led by Todd Parkin. The sale was approved by the FCC on July 1, and completed on July 9. In March 2026, Community News Media LLC, which operates as Standard Media Group and is led by Soohyung Kim with Deborah McDermott as chief executive, agreed to acquire Rincon Broadcasting's stations, including KHQA-TV, for $116.5 million; the sale was completed on October 1.

== Technical information ==
=== Subchannels ===
The station's signal is multiplexed:

Subchannels of KHQA-TV
| Subchannel | Res. | Short name | Programming |
|---|---|---|---|
| 7.1 | 1080i | CBS | CBS |
| 7.2 | 720p | ABC | ABC |
| 7.3 | 480i | Comet | Comet |
| 7.4 | 480i | ROAR | Roar |

Before KHQA-DT2 started, sister station KTVO in Kirksville, Missouri, had served as the default analog ABC affiliate for the area. KTVO launched a CBS-affiliated second digital subchannel on May 15, 2010, effectively marking the network's return to that station after a 36-year absence. KHQA-DT1 was eventually upgraded from 720p into 1080i.

=== Analog-to-digital conversion ===
KHQA-TV shut down its analog signal, over VHF channel 7, on June 12, 2009, the official date on which full-power television stations in the United States transitioned from analog to digital broadcasts under federal mandate. The station's digital signal relocated from its pre-transition UHF channel 29 to VHF channel 7.
