= KGRC =

Coordinates: 39.730°N 91.405°W

- Hannibal, Missouri; United States
- Broadcast area: Quincy, Illinois; Hannibal, Missouri; Keokuk, Iowa
- Frequency: 92.9 MHz
- Branding: Real 92.9

Programming
- Format: Top 40 (CHR)
- Affiliations: Premiere Networks

Ownership
- Owner: STARadio Corporation
- Sister stations: KZZK, WQCY, WCOY, WTAD

History
- Call sign meaning: Great River Country

Technical information
- Licensing authority: FCC
- Facility ID: 62332
- Class: C1
- ERP: 100,000 watts
- HAAT: 153 meters

Links
- Public license information: Public file; LMS
- Webcast: Listen Live
- Website: real929.com

KGRC (92.9 FM) is a CHR (Top 40) format radio station in the Quincy, Illinois, region owned by STARadio Corporation.

== History ==
The station was purchased by STARadio Corporation in early 2004 to compete with KRRY (Y101), which was dominating the Quincy-Hannibal-Keokuk market. No other Top 40/Hot AC station was in the region.

Great River Country welcomed KGRC to life in 1968. It was the brain child of Mel Elzea, the stations first GM, and partner Frank Laughlin. They helped create Great River Communications, Inc., and signed the FM giant on air with the Fifth Dimension pop hit, “Up, Up and Away.” The station went on to become the dominant aural medium in the market in the 1970s. Highlights of the early years include a gold record for first airing, “Indian Reservation,” by The Raiders, (Paul Revere and the Raiders featuring Mark Lindsay) and Missouri Broadcasting awards for flood coverage from up, up in a plane with Elzea and Program Director Mark Mathew.

KGRC covered many formats through the 1970s and 1980s, primarily drifting between some form of Adult Contemporary and Top 40.

The station sponsored Explorer scout "Troop 929" in the early-1970s. Scouts included John Wingate, a long-time television journalist and now a Minneapolis communications consultant and writer, Dan Matticks, a longtime radio broadcaster, video producer Louie Schaefer, IT professional Larry Schaffer, Ken Abbath, and Paula Dean.

The early-1990s brought the "Hot AC" boom, and a switch to the nickname "Variety 93".

By 2000, the station had become "92.9 The River", and flipped to its current Top-40 format. Today, it is known as "Real 92.9".

== Signal/Coverage ==
KGRC is one of the primary radio signals of the Tri-State region. The station has 100,000 Watts of power so it covers a wide audience. The station's signal goes from Macon, Missouri, to Jacksonville, Illinois and Troy, Missouri, to Fort Madison, Iowa.

== Programming ==
=== Elvis Duran ===
The Elvis Duran and the Morning Show is the daily morning show on Real 92.9 and is a syndicated program from New York City which also is broadcast on other stations throughout the country.

=== Retro Lunch ===
The Retro Lunch starts at Noon and features Retro hits of the 1990s and early-2000s. The program lasts about 60 minutes.

=== American Top 40 ===
The American Top 40 (AT40) is a weekly countdown on Saturday nights that is heard in 400 cities, more than 30 countries, and the Armed Forces Network

=== Most Requested Live ===
Formerly known as Saturday Night Online, Most Requested Live is a syndicated interactive radio show known for its artist interviews and social media presence.

== See also ==
- List of media outlets in Quincy, Illinois
