= KWBZ =

Coordinates: 39.587°N 91.799°W

- Monroe City, Missouri; United States
- Frequency: 107.5 MHz
- Branding: Real Country 107.5 The Lake

Programming
- Format: Country
- Affiliations: AP News; Real Country

Ownership
- Owner: Larry Bostwick; (LB Sports Productions LLC)
- Sister stations: WPWQ

History
- First air date: July 4, 1981
- Former call signs: KLCQ (1981–1987); KDAM (1987–2000)

Technical information
- Licensing authority: FCC
- Facility ID: 43536
- Class: C3
- ERP: 10,000 watts
- HAAT: 100 meters (330 ft)

Links
- Public license information: Public file; LMS
- Webcast: Listen live
- Website: https://www.kwbzfm.com

KWBZ (107.5 FM) is an American radio station licensed to Monroe City, Missouri, covering Northeast Missouri, including Hannibal. KWBZ airs a country music format while also airing local high school sports, Mizzou athletics, and NASCAR. The station is owned by Larry Bostwick, through licensee LB Sports Productions.

== History ==
=== KLCQ ===
The station began broadcasting on July 4, 1981, holding the call sign KLCQ, and originally broadcast at 106.3 MHz, with an ERP of 2,400 watts at a HAAT of 330 feet. It was originally owned by Lynnlee Broadcasting. The station aired a full service format. In 1987, the station was sold to Twain Lake Broadcasting for $60,000.

=== KDAM ===
On December 28, 1987, the station's call sign was changed to KDAM. The station would begin airing a CHR format. In November 1992, the station adopted an oldies format, airing programming from Satellite Music Network's "Kool Gold" network. The station went silent in November 1993. In 1994, the station was granted a permit to change frequency to 107.5 MHz, and the station's license was transferred to Phoenix I Broadcasting. The station returned to the air in July 1996, airing an oldies format. In 1998, the station was sold to Big Signal Broadcasting for $38,500. In 2000, the station was sold to WPW Broadcasting for $240,000.

=== KWBZ ===
Station's logo during simulcast with WPWQ

In July 2000, the station's call sign was changed to KWBZ, and the station began airing a soft AC format as "The Breeze". In 2003, the station's ERP was increased to 10,000 watts. By 2005, the station had begun airing a classic hits format. By 2008, the station had begun to be simulcast the oldies format of 106.7 WPWQ in Mount Sterling, Illinois, and the station was branded "The Oldies Superstation". In 2014, the station was sold to Larry Bostwick, along with WPWQ, for $175,000. In 2017, KWBZ adopted a country music format, ending the simulcast.
