= KICK-FM =

Radio station in Palmyra, Missouri

Coordinates: 39.757°N 91.500°W

- Palmyra, Missouri; United States
- Broadcast area: Quincy-Hannibal
- Frequency: 97.9 MHz
- Branding: 97.9 KICK-FM

Programming
- Format: Country
- Affiliations: Compass Media Networks

Ownership
- Owner: Townsquare Media; (Townsquare License, LLC)
- Sister stations: KHMO, KRRY, WLIQ

History
- Former call signs: KIDS (1981–1991)

Technical information
- Licensing authority: FCC
- Facility ID: 5203
- Class: C2
- ERP: 43,000 watts
- HAAT: 162 meters

Links
- Public license information: Public file; LMS
- Webcast: Listen Live
- Website: 979kickfm.com

KICK-FM (97.9 MHz) is a radio station licensed to Palmyra, Missouri and serves the Quincy-Hannibal area. The station is owned by Townsquare Media.

It broadcasts a country music format to the greater Quincy, Illinois, and Hannibal, Missouri, area. The station's studios are located in Quincy, Illinois.

Logo under previous slogan

== See also ==
- List of media outlets in Quincy, Illinois
