= WPWQ =

Coordinates: 39.943°N 90.962°W

- Mount Sterling, Illinois; United States
- Broadcast area: Western Illinois / Quincy / Hannibal
- Frequency: 106.7 MHz
- Branding: The Oldies Superstation

Programming
- Format: Oldies

Ownership
- Owner: Larry Bostwick; (LB Sports Productions LLC)
- Sister stations: KWBZ, WKXQ, WRMS-FM, WVIL

History
- First air date: September 1995
- Former call signs: WBRJ (1995–1998); WLRT (1998–2000)
- Call sign meaning: W P W (Broadcasting) of Quincy

Technical information
- Licensing authority: FCC
- Facility ID: 39624
- Class: B1
- ERP: 25,000 watts
- HAAT: 100 meters (330 ft)

Links
- Public license information: Public file; LMS
- Webcast: Listen live
- Website: www.wpwqfm.com

WPWQ (106.7 FM) is a radio station licensed to Mount Sterling, Illinois, covering Western Illinois, including Quincy, Pittsfield, and Hannibal, Missouri. The station airs an oldies format and is owned by Larry Bostwick, through licensee LB Sports Productions LLC.

== History ==
=== WBRJ ===
The station began broadcasting in September 1995, holding the call sign WBRJ, and airing a classic rock format as "The Bridge". It was originally owned by Magnum Broadcasting. In 1997, the station was sold to Tele-Media Broadcasting for $218,364, and it began to simulcast the talk programming of 930 WTAD. Later that year, Tele-Media Broadcasting was purchased by Citadel. In 1998, the station was sold to STARadio Corporation. Later that year, the station was sold to Larry and Cathy Price, and the station's call sign was changed to WLRT.

=== Oldies format ===
Station's logo during simulcast on KWBZ

In 1999, the station adopted an oldies format, branded "Golden 106.7". Later that year, the station was sold to WPW Communications for $550,000. In 2000, the station's call sign was changed to WPWQ, and the station was branded "Q 106", with the slogan "Good Times and Great Oldies". By 2008, the station had begun to be simulcast on 107.5 KWBZ in Monroe City, Missouri, and the station was branded "The Oldies Superstation". In 2014, the station was sold to Larry Bostwick, along with KWBZ, for $175,000. In 2017, KWBZ switched to a country music format, ending the simulcast.
