= KXGF =

Coordinates: 47°27′55.8″N 111°19′24.9″W

- Great Falls, Montana; United States
- Frequency: 1400 kHz
- Branding: Fox Sports Radio 1400 AM & 98.3 FM

Programming
- Format: Sports
- Affiliations: Fox Sports Radio

Ownership
- Owner: STARadio Corporation

History
- First air date: March 5, 1947
- Former call signs: KXLK (1946–1960); KARR (1960–1984); KYOT (1984–1987)

Technical information
- Licensing authority: FCC
- Facility ID: 63878
- Class: C
- Power: 680 watts
- Translator: 98.3 K252EW (Black Eagle)

Links
- Public license information: Public file; LMS
- Website: www.1400kxgf.com/kxgf-main-page.html

KXGF (1400 AM, "Fox Sports Radio 1400 AM & 98.3 FM") is a sports radio station in Great Falls, Montana, United States. It is owned by STARadio Corporation, and features programming from Fox Sports Radio.

== History ==
=== Early years ===
On June 27, 1946, the Great Falls Broadcasting Company obtained a construction permit to build a new radio station on 1400 kHz in Great Falls, Montana. The second outlet in Great Falls, KXLK, went on the air March 5, 1947. It was part of the Z-Bar Network and joined NBC within days of starting. Studios and transmitter were maintained at the Park Hotel until moving to a site off Smelter Avenue in 1953.

Z-Bar owner Ed Craney purchased KFBB radio and KFBB-TV in 1958. This required him to divest KXLK. Pat Goodover, the manager of Z-Bar outlet KXLL at Missoula, purchased the station for $60,000 in order to clear the way for the KFBB purchase. Under Goodover, KXLK applied to increase power to 1,000 watts. The call letters were also changed to KARR on April 15, 1960, in order to indicate that the station was no longer owned by Z-Bar directly (though it still maintained an affiliation with the regional network). Goodover also applied in 1962 for an FM station to accompany KARR, which launched December 31, 1963, as KARR-FM. To manage his growing businesses, Goodover, his wife Emma, and William E. Murray incorporated Radio-TV Enterprises at the end of 1962. Goodover sold the AM and FM stations in 1972 to Greater Montana Broadcasting, a company formed by Alan Cummings of Evanston, Illinois.

=== Christian, rock, country and silence ===
In 1977, Cummings sold the AM station to Northern Montana Family Radio, a nonprofit corporation chartered to bring the first Christian radio station to the Great Falls area. The existing programming of KARR was replaced with Christian and "wholesome secular" music that August. The next year, the new ownership began pursuing a new transmitter site on the southwest edge of town, off Fox Farm Road.

The foray into Christian radio ended in 1982 after Taylor Broadcasting Company purchased the station from Christian Enterprises, Inc., to which the previous licensee had assigned the station. The format was changed to rock, with an FM-style presentation, but the station was a poor ratings performer and hindered by signal issues and previous perceptions associated with the call sign under prior management. KARR's rock format gave way to KYOT, the "Country Coyote", in 1984; the format flip meant that only one AM station in Great Falls did not play country music.

Taylor sold the station to Donald Kimball, who sold all of his stake in the Plush Pillow, a waterbed dealership in Great Falls, to take it over in December 1985. However, insufficient cash flow caused the station to close down on March 27, 1986, and be turned back over to Christian Enterprises in lieu of foreclosure. Kimball and his wife later disclosed in bankruptcy filings that May that they were $322,000 in debt to the Christian firm.

=== KXGF ===
We found a weathered one-story building surrounded by knee-deep prairie grass, and a chilly wind whistled through the silent station’s 240-foot tower greatly in need of paint.

— Lois Lonnquist, on what she found when seeing the abandoned facility for the first time

Christian Enterprises opted not to run the station itself. It sold the silent KYOT to the Lonnquist family of La Crosse, Wisconsin, which returned it to the air on April 14, 1987, as KXGF, with an oldies/adult standards format. Del Lonnquist had grown restless after attempting retirement and wanted back in the small-market radio business. Through a broker, he learned that KYOT was on the market and purchased it. As Lois later wrote in a 1997 article in Guideposts, it took some time for advertisers to be willing to pay for air time on the new outlet; furthermore, the family was slow in receiving payment from the new owners of their previous stations. Months into owning the station, Lois typed a letter to God that ended, "How long can we go on?" However, the next day, she received a note of support from an elderly listener who noted that his wife died while listening to one of her favorite songs on KXGF, giving her strength to continue.

In late 1997, the Lonnquists sold KXGF to Don and Carley Robinson, owners of KAAK (98.9 FM), who in turn sold both properties to Sunbrook Broadcasting in early 1988. Sunbrook sold its radio properties—ten in Montana and a pair in Wenatchee, Washington—to Seattle-based Fisher Broadcasting in 1994, with Sunbrook becoming a division of Fisher after the sale was completed. It then acquired the two stations owned by Oilers Communications the next year. Fisher maintained the long-running standards format until flipping to sports, with programming from ESPN Radio, in 2005.

In June 2006, a deal was reached for KXGF to be acquired by Cherry Creek Radio from Fisher as part of a 24-station deal with a total reported sale price of $33.3 million. Most of the transaction occurred as planned, but the Great Falls stations were not included, likely because Cherry Creek would have had to sell five stations in the market to remain within ownership limits. STARadio purchased the Great Falls cluster in 2011, marking Fisher's disposition of its small-market radio properties.

ESPN Radio moved to a new station, KUUS (103.9 FM) "The Sports Dog", in January 2009. Fisher then flipped KXGF to classic country. On December 26, 2009, KXGF launched FM translator K252EW and flipped to hot adult contemporary, branded as "Star 98.3". After the STARadio purchase in 2011, the station returned to sports, this time using Fox Sports Radio programming.
