= KQDI-FM =

Radio station in Highwood–Great Falls, Montana

- Highwood, Montana; United States
- Broadcast area: Great Falls, Montana
- Frequency: 106.1 MHz
- Branding: Q106

Programming
- Format: Active rock
- Affiliations: United Stations Radio Networks

Ownership
- Owner: STARadio Corporation
- Sister stations: KIKF; KIMO; KQDI; KXGF

History
- First air date: 1964 (as KARR-FM at 106.3)
- Former call signs: KARR-FM (1964); KOPR-FM (1964–1977); KOOZ (1977–1984); KQDI-FM (1984–1985); KOOZ-FM (1985–1989)
- Former frequencies: 106.3 MHz (1964–1987)

Technical information
- Licensing authority: FCC
- Facility ID: 32386
- Class: C1
- ERP: 100,000 watts
- HAAT: 113 meters (371 ft)
- Transmitter coordinates: 47°32′22.8″N 111°17′8.9″W

Links
- Public license information: Public file; LMS
- Webcast: Listen live
- Website: www.q106rocks.com

KQDI-FM (106.1 MHz, "Q106") is a radio station broadcasting an active rock format. Licensed to Highwood, Montana, the station serves the Great Falls area. KQDI-FM is currently owned by STARadio Corporation.

== History ==
The station went on the air as KARR-FM in 1964, changing to KOPR-FM on December 15 of that year. It was acquired in 1977 by Sun River Broadcasting, owner of KQDI (1450 AM), and became easy listening KOOZ.

In 1984, the station changed to Top 40/CHR under the name "K-106" and with new KQDI-FM call letters. The change was short-lived, as KOOZ-FM returned the next year.

On January 1, 1989, the easy listening format moved to AM, and KOOZ became KQDI-FM again with a classic rock format.
