= Rockcliffe Mansion =

Historic house in Missouri, United States

- U.S. National Register of Historic Places
- U.S. Historic district – Contributing property
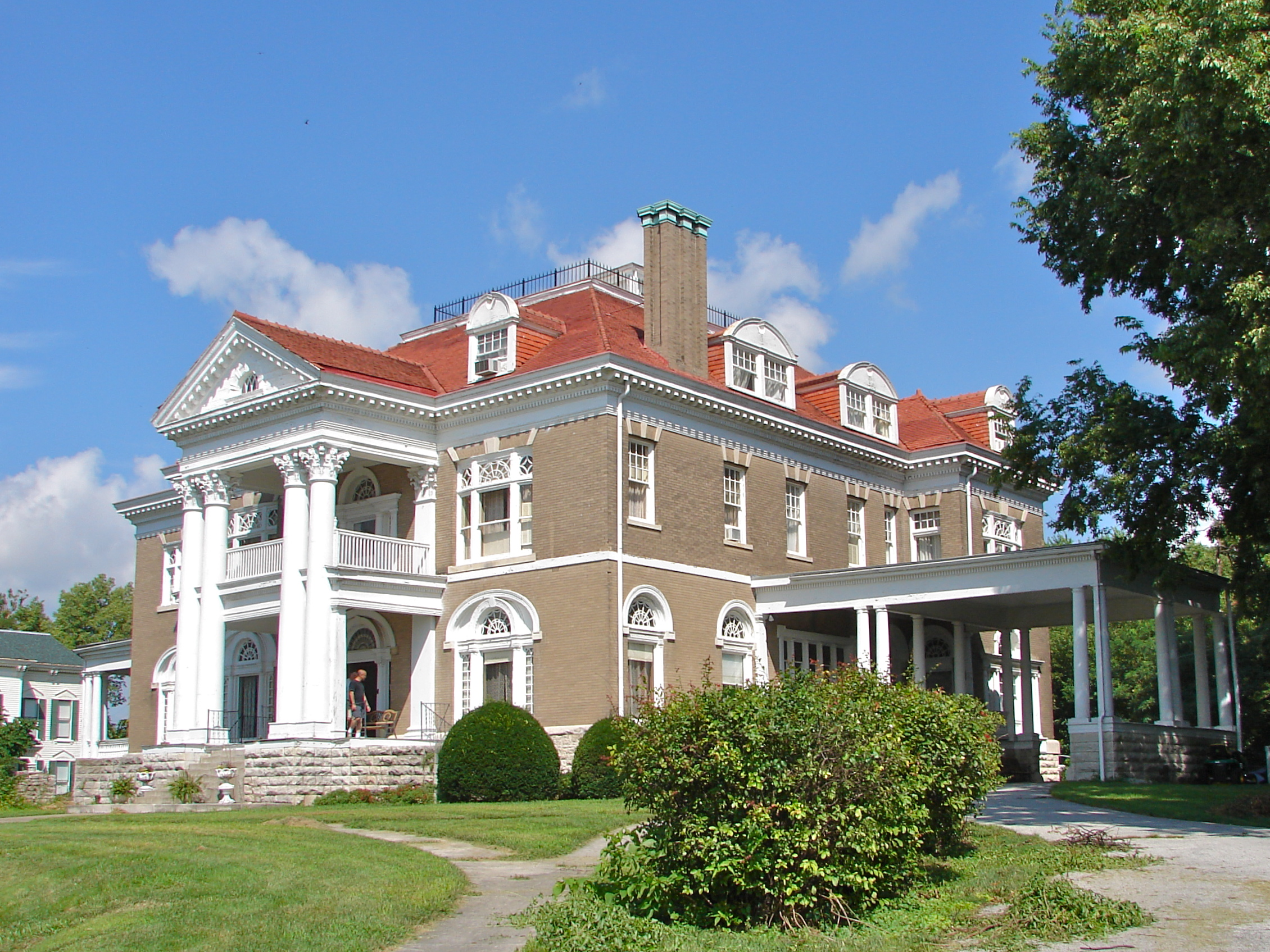

- Location within Missouri Location within the United States
- Interactive map showing the location of Rockcliffe Mansion
- Location: Hannibal, MO
- Coordinates: 39°42′28.58″N 91°21′56.65″W
- Built: 1898
- Architect: Barnett, Haynes & Barnett
- Architectural style: Colonial Revival
- NRHP reference No.: 80002378
- Added to NRHP: September 18, 1980

Rockcliffe Mansion is located in Hannibal, Missouri (USA) and was built in 1898 by John J. Cruikshank, Jr, a descendant of Scottish immigrants, whose fortune was founded on lumber. He erected the residence on West Bird Street. It came to be acknowledged as the most imposing, beautiful and costly residential structure in that part of the state of Missouri. "By reason of its location on a high, rocky eminence, overlooking the entire city [and the Mississippi River], it [was] termed 'Rock Cliff' [later known as "Rockcliffe"], and is one of the many attractions of the city invariably viewed by strangers and tourists visiting Hannibal." It is located in the Maple Avenue Historic District.

== Structure ==
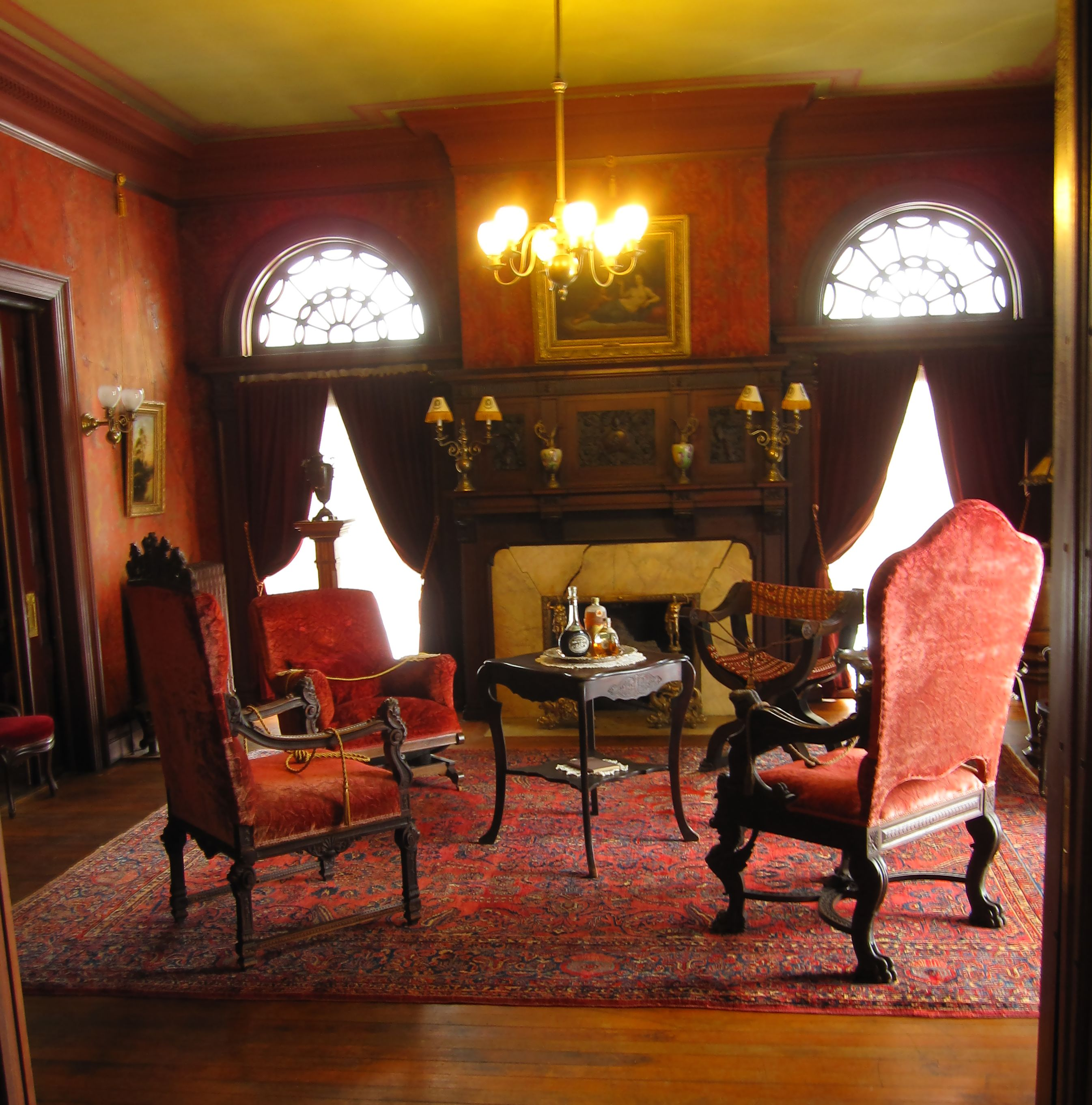
A parlor in the mansion

Rockcliffe is a massive 13,500-square-foot (1,250 m^{2}) Colonial Revival/Georgian Style residence, "with large columns and porches almost circling the building," built of double-brick wall construction, and designed by the St. Louis firm of Barnett, Haynes & Barnett, the firm which also planned "the Governor's Mansion in Jefferson City, the St. Louis Cathedral, and other fine buildings."

"The staid exterior featuring a monumental double-height portico with Corinthian columns gives no hint of the richness within - an interior embellished with exotic woods, South African pink marble, and Tiffany glass. The owner's business connection in lumber and construction presumably helped control building costs, which are nevertheless reported to have been $125,000. A St. Louis newspaper cited it as the finest residence in the state soon after [he, his wife and four daughters] moved into the house in 1900. When the family moved out in 1924 after Cruikshank's death, no one else ever moved in; the house sat empty for 43 years, except for a caretaker family who lived there for a number of years.

Arranged around the central hall are grand public rooms meant for entertaining. To one side is the Reception Room, with gilded wallpaper, quarter-sawn oak paneling, and Tiffany fixtures, furnished with a lemonwood sideboard and olivewood reception table commissioned in Florence. The pink and green Music Room is anchored at each end by a grand piano; the Green Room reflects the sensibilities of Mrs. Cruikshank in its gold leaf and garlands, lace and velvet drapes, and white onyx fireplace. Friend and writer Mark Twain [the guest of honor on his last visit to Hannibal] addressed 300 guests and Hannibal citizens from the double staircase [leading to] the second floor during his visit in 1902. The Moorish Room provides the de rigueur eclecticism embraced by the period [including L.C. Tiffany lighting fixtures and stained glass windows]."

The house has 125 windows [including several large Palladian windows] and 10 fireplaces [of marble and tile]. Cruikshank prided himself on the structural and decorative use of wood on the property, and employed mahogany, oak, and walnut throughout the house. Greek Revival and Art Nouveau decorative motifs recur in various rooms. "Most of the rooms had individual thermostatic heat control from a central coal burning steam heating plant. The building originally had electric lighting, but auxiliary gas lights were installed. Rock walls were constructed as part of the landscaping of the property."

Rockcliffe Mansion is located at 1000 West Bird Street.

== Ownership change ==
Following the death of J. J. Cruikshank Jr. in 1924, the mansion was unoccupied for the next 43 years. During the house's four-decade vacancy it had settled less than half of an inch.

Rockcliffe was purchased by private individuals in 1967 who initially intended to have the structure razed. However, with the help of heirs to the Cruikshank family, the interior was able to be restored. A Cruikshank daughter returned some of the original furnishings, linens, and lace to the property, which she had carefully stored for decades.

Rockcliffe is in the National Register of Historic Places and is open to the public for tours and special events. Rockcliffe still boasts its original furniture, wall coverings, lighting fixtures, bathroom fixtures, books, clothing, and personal artifacts of the Cruikshank family. Ongoing work is aimed at restoring the mansion to its original turn-of-the-century state.

The mansion is open for guided tours daily. Bed and Breakfast accommodations are also available.
