= KINX =

- Fairfield, Montana; United States
- Broadcast area: Teton and Cascade counties
- Frequency: 102.7 MHz (FM)
- Branding: KINX 102.7

Programming
- Format: News, talk

Ownership
- Owner: STARadio; (16 November 2010–1 April 2013)

History
- First air date: 2011
- Former frequencies: 107.3 MHz (FM)

Technical information
- Licensing authority: FCC
- Class: C1
- ERP: 100,000 watts (horizontal); 66,700 watts (vertical)
- HAAT: 273 m (896 ft); AGL 198 m (650 ft); AMSL 1,362 m (4,469 ft)
- Transmitter coordinates: 47°36′24.6″N 111°21′32.9″W

Links
- Public license information: Public file; LMS
- Website: link

KINX (102.7 FM) is an American news/talk formatted radio station owned by STARadio Corporation and licensed to serve the community of Fairfield in Teton County, Montana, to cover Great Falls.

It was adult hits Sam FM until 2011 when it spun off its format at 107.3 FM and moved to 102.7 FM where it flipped to talk. The radio studio is located at number 1300 of Central Avenue West in Great Falls (47.5076°N 111.3346°W).
