= Melissa Scholes Young =

American writer (born 1975)

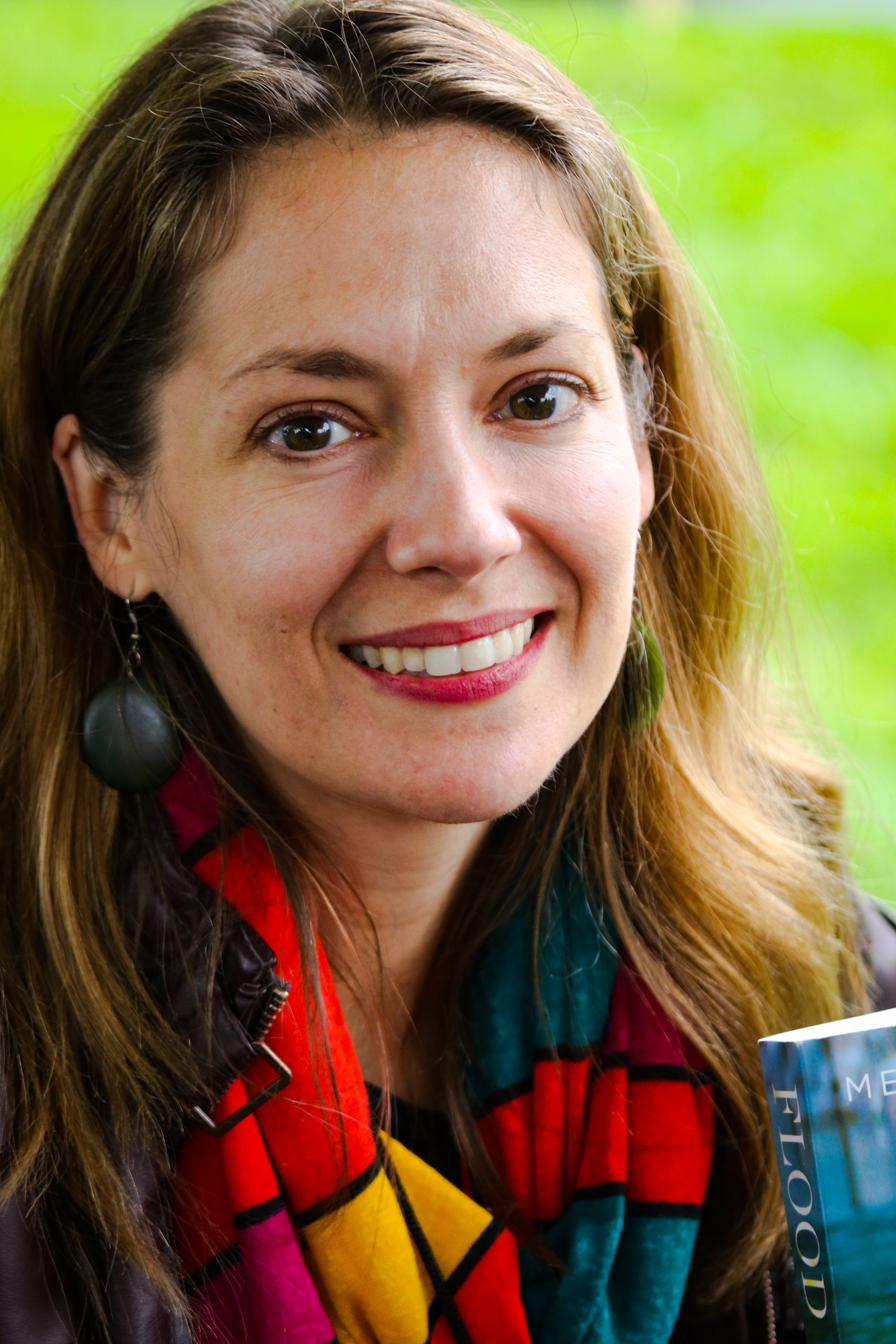
- Melissa Scholes Young at the 2018 Gaithersburg Book Festival
- Born: Hannibal, Missouri, U.S.
- Education: Southern Illinois University (MFA); Stetson University (MA); Monmouth College (BA)
- Occupations: Author, professor
- Employer: American University
- Known for: Creative Writing
- Notable work: Flood, "A Soft Place to Rest," American Fiction vol. 15
- Awards: Bread Loaf Bakeless Camargo Fellowship, 2015
- Website: https://melissascholesyoung.com/

Melissa Scholes Young (born 1975) is an American writer.

== Early life and education ==
Scholes Young was born in Hannibal, Missouri. She graduated from Monmouth College in 1997 with a BA in history, from Stetson University with an MA in education, and from Southern Illinois University with an MFA in Creative Writing.

== Career ==
Scholes Young edited two volumes of new work by women writers, Grace in Darkness (2018) and Furious Gravity (2020), which was featured on the Kojo Nnamdi Show, Washington Independent Review of Books, Medium, and at Politics & Prose Bookstore.

She is a contributing editor for Fiction Writers Review and Editor of the Grace & Gravity anthology. Her writing has appeared in American Fiction, The Atlantic, Literary Hub, Ms. Magazine, Narrative, Origins Literary Magazine, Ploughshares, Poet Lore, Poets & Writers, The Washington Independent Review of Books, and The Washington Post.

Scholes Young attended the Bread Loaf Writers' Conference in 2014 and was awarded the Bread Loaf Bakeless Camargo Fellowship in 2015.

She also published her debut novel, Flood, in 2017. The novel received reviews from residents and press in Hannibal, Missouri: Scholes Young's hometown, Mark Twain's hometown, and the setting and inspiration of the novel. The novel also received attention from the literary community in Washington, D.C. and brought rise to Scholes Young's creative writing career as an emerging author in the nation's capital.

Scholes Young, sharing a hometown with Mark Twain, has written fiction that reimagines Tom and Huck's famous friendship as female and scholarship concerned with the character portrayal of Becky Thatcher.

Scholes Young's second novel, The Hive, is forthcoming in 2021 from Turner Publishing. The novel has been optioned by Sony Entertainment.

She teaches in the Department of Literature at American University in Washington, D.C. where she champions first-generation student issues.
