= KJIR =

- Hannibal, Missouri; United States
- Frequency: 91.7 MHz
- Branding: The Cross

Programming
- Format: Southern Gospel

Ownership
- Owner: Believers Broadcasting Corporation

Technical information
- Licensing authority: FCC
- Facility ID: 82721
- Class: C2
- ERP: 12,000 watts
- HAAT: 173.7 meters
- Transmitter coordinates: 39°41′54″N 91°29′48″W

Links
- Public license information: Public file; LMS
- Webcast: listen live
- Website: kjir.org

KJIR (91.7 FM) is a radio station broadcasting a Southern Gospel format, with educational and worship programs. Licensed to Hannibal, Missouri, United States, the station serves the areas of Hannibal; Quincy, Illinois; and Keokuk, Iowa. The station is currently owned by Believers Broadcasting Corporation.
