= KQDI (AM) =

Radio station in Great Falls, Montana

- Great Falls, Montana; United States
- Broadcast area: Great Falls area
- Frequency: 1450 kHz
- Branding: News Talk 1450

Programming
- Format: News/talk
- Affiliations: Westwood One; Premiere Radio Networks

Ownership
- Owner: STARadio Corporation

History
- First air date: September 23, 1955 (as KBGF)
- Former call signs: KBGF (1955–57, April–May 1957); KUDI (January–April 1957, 1957–1976); KQDI (1976–1992); KMSL (1992–1997)

Technical information
- Licensing authority: FCC
- Facility ID: 32387
- Class: C
- Power: 720 watts unlimited
- Transmitter coordinates: 47°27′55.8″N 111°19′24.9″W
- Translator: 97.5 K248DJ (Great Falls)

Links
- Public license information: Public file; LMS
- Website: www.newstalk1450.com

KQDI (1450 AM, "NewsTalk 1450") is a radio station broadcasting a news/talk format. Licensed to Great Falls, Montana, United States, the station serves the Great Falls area. The station is owned by STARadio Corporation and features programming from Westwood One and Premiere Radio Networks.

== History ==
=== KBGF and KUDI ===
KQDI went on the air as KBGF on September 23, 1955. It was owned by Community Broadcasters, Inc., a group of local businessmen, and was the city's fourth radio station. The call letters stood for "Keep Building Great Falls". From its inception, it operated as a contemporary Top 40 music radio station. KBGF was sold to a group of Washington state radio owners and operators in January 1957. The group included Paul Crain, Del Cody, Walter N. Nelskog, and D. Gene Williams. The sale was approved by the Federal Communications Commission (FCC) in July 1957, and the call letters changed to KUDI. The new call letters were an acronym for "Keep Up Doing It".

Crain, who owned a financial interest in television stations KRTV in Great Falls and KULR in Billings, eventually bought out his partners. He sold the station in May 1961 for $300,000 ($3,200,000 in 2025 dollars) to James F. Hadlock of Hollywood, California. The station suffered a fire on April 5, 1964, that completely destroyed its studio and transmitter building on Smelter Avenue; several business records were protected in a filing cabinet, but the station lost its entire record library Hadlock sold the station to Leo Graybill of Great Falls in 1965. Graybill established Frontier Broadcasting to own the business, with stock in Frontier owned by his family. In the early 1970s, the Graybill family sold some stock to KUDI's general manager, Jerry Hartline.

KUDI was regularly ranked second in listeners in the Great Falls market in the late 1960s and 1970s behind KMON (560 AM). KEIN (1310 AM) changed its format to Top 40 after a change in ownership in 1972 and quickly began gaining on KUDI. Independent since its inception, KUDI affiliated with the CBS Radio Network in 1974. Robert Schuster, a former life insurance agent, replaced Hartline as general manager in August 1975.

=== KQDI ===
Frontier Broadcasting sold KUDI to Sun River Broadcasting in January 1976. Sun River Broadcasting was owned by Tom Ingstad and Bob Lockhart. Ingstad was a member of a family which owned Ingstad Broadcasting, a privately held company that owned radio stations in Minnesota, North Dakota, and South Dakota. The sale was approved by the FCC on July 30, 1976. KUDI signed off the air on September 3, 1976. The station went back on the air on September 15, 1976 as KQDI. During the 12 days of broadcasting silence, the station made major studio and transmitter improvements. As "The New Q", KQDI deemphasized news and information in favor of a Top 40-only format.

Sun River also bought KOPR-FM 106.3 and changed its call letters to KOOZ in 1977; that station aired an easy listening format for much of the next 12 years, except for a brief period in late 1984 and 1985 when it was Top 40-formatted KQDI-FM. On January 1, 1989, the rock format permanently moved to FM and 106.1 became KQDI-FM, with the former FM format appearing on AM.

Both stations were devastated when the Scan-Am Building downtown, which housed KQDI-AM-FM and other businesses, burned to the ground on July 27, 1989. It was the second fire in the history of KUDI/KQDI. It took three months to return the FM to the air and another month for the AM outlet.

=== KMSL ===
The station changed its call letters to KMSL on August 7, 1992. On September 3, 1997, the station changed its call sign back to the current KQDI.

In June 2006, a deal was reached by Fisher Radio Regional Group to sell KQDI to Cherry Creek Radio as part of a 24 station deal with a total reported sale price of $33.3 million. The deal was never completed.
