= KHMO =

Radio station in Missouri, US

- Hannibal, Missouri; United States
- Broadcast area: Hannibal, Missouri; Quincy, Illinois
- Frequency: 1070 kHz
- Branding: AM 1070

Programming
- Format: News/talk
- Affiliations: Fox News Radio; Compass Media Networks; Premiere Networks; Radio America; Salem Radio Network; Westwood One

Ownership
- Owner: Townsquare Media; (Townsquare License, LLC)
- Sister stations: KICK-FM, KRRY, WLIQ

History
- First air date: October 2, 1941
- Call sign meaning: K Hannibal, MissOuri

Technical information
- Licensing authority: FCC
- Facility ID: 5205
- Class: B
- Power: 5,000 watts day; 1,000 watts night
- Transmitter coordinates: 39°37′46.16″N 91°22′33.54″W

Links
- Public license information: Public file; LMS
- Webcast: Listen live
- Website: khmoam.com

KHMO (1070 AM) is a radio station in Hannibal, Missouri, United States. The station airs a news/talk format and is owned by Townsquare Media.

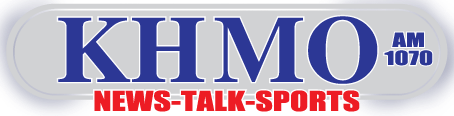
Previous logo
