= WQCY =

Radio station in Quincy, Illinois

Coordinates: 39.942°N 91.584°W

Quincy, Illinois; United States
- Broadcast area: Quincy, Illinois; Hannibal, Missouri
- Frequency: 103.9 MHz
- Branding: Q104

Programming
- Format: Adult contemporary
- Affiliations: Premiere Networks

Ownership
- Owner: STARadio Corporation

History
- First air date: May 8, 1989
- Former call signs: WZLZ (1988–1995); WMOS (1995–1999)
- Call sign meaning: "Quincy"

Technical information
- Licensing authority: FCC
- Facility ID: 37579
- Class: A
- ERP: 1,800 watts
- HAAT: 133 meters

Links
- Public license information: Public file; LMS
- Webcast: Listen Live
- Website: q104wqcy.com

WQCY (103.9 FM) is a radio station in Quincy, Illinois, United States, known as Q104. WQCY is owned by STARadio Corporation.

== History ==
In November 1983, Linda Crook petitioned the Federal Communications Commission to allocate a third commercial FM radio station to Quincy. After the commission approved in January 1985, Crook and another party filed to build the proposed station, with Crook prevailing after more than two years in comparative hearing. WZLZ went on the air May 8, 1989, offering an album-oriented rock format. It was managed by Linda's husband, Ron.

Ron Crook died in an automobile accident on April 30, 1993. The station then took a second massive blow when the Great Flood of 1993 devastated communities along the Mississippi River, including Quincy and Hannibal; the loss of revenue after the flood was so great that the station left the air in September 1993.

Tele-Media Broadcasting Company of Rhode Island, owner of WTAD and WQCY 99.5, filed in 1994 to buy the silent WZLZ. Tele-Media returned the station to air in April 1995 as WMOS "The Moose", offering a mix of album-oriented and classic rock. The rock format had shifted to alternative rock by 1997, when Tele-Media opted to replace it with soft adult contemporary as "Lite 104" to increase ratings.

STARadio Corporation moved in 1998 to acquire WMOS and its sister stations from Citadel Broadcasting. In August 1999, STARadio moved the WQCY adult contemporary format and call letters from 99.5 to 103.9, relaunching the 99.5 station with a country music format under new WCOY call letters.

The Q104 format was abandoned in November 2004 to become a mix of classic hits and sports as 103.9 The Fox. The station aired 18 to 20 hours a day of music plus key Fox Sports Radio programs and local and national sports play-by-play. The Fox lasted until January 2015, when the Q104 name and adult contemporary format were restored.

== See also ==
- List of media outlets in Quincy, Illinois
