= WLIQ =

Coordinates: 39°55′51″N 91°25′46″W

- Quincy, Illinois; United States
- Frequency: 1530 kHz
- Branding: Kick AM 1530

Programming
- Format: Classic country

Ownership
- Owner: Townsquare Media Group; (Townsquare License, LLC)
- Sister stations: KHMO, KICK-FM, KRRY

History
- First air date: December 13, 1966 (in Bowling Green, Missouri)
- Former call signs: KPCR (1966–2006)

Technical information
- Licensing authority: FCC
- Facility ID: 52576
- Class: D
- Power: 1,400 watts 290 watts critical hours

Links
- Public license information: Public file; LMS
- Webcast: Listen Live
- Website: kickam1530.com

WLIQ (1530 AM) is a radio station broadcasting a classic country format. Licensed to Quincy, Illinois, the station is owned by Townsquare Media Group. This is an example of a station registered with an address in one state and its transmitter in another state. The signal comes out of West Quincy in Missouri.
