= KHBL-LP =

- Hannibal, Missouri; United States
- Broadcast area: America's Hometown
- Frequency: 96.9 MHz

Programming
- Format: Community

Ownership
- Owner: KHBL, a non-profit corporation in Missouri

History
- First air date: February 14, 2003
- Call sign meaning: HanniBaL

Technical information
- Licensing authority: FCC
- Facility ID: 131710
- Class: L1
- ERP: 100 watts
- HAAT: 84.2 meters (276 feet)
- Transmitter coordinates: 39°41′55″N 91°21′29″W

Links
- Public license information: LMS
- Website: KHBL.com

KHBL-LP (96.9 FM) is a low-power community radio station licensed to serve Hannibal, Missouri. The station is owned by KHBL, a not for profit corporation in Missouri. It airs a community radio format. The station's music programming includes a mix of music from the 1950s to the present.

The station was assigned the KHBL-LP call letters by the Federal Communications Commission on February 19, 2002.

== See also ==
- List of community radio stations in the United States
