= WGEM-FM =

Radio station in Quincy, Illinois

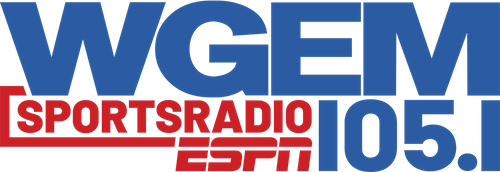
- Quincy, Illinois; United States
- Broadcast area: Quincy/Hannibal/Keokuk
- Frequency: 105.1 MHz
- Branding: WGEM Sports Radio 105.1

Programming
- Format: Sports radio
- Affiliations: ESPN Radio; Westwood One; WGEM-TV

Ownership
- Owner: Gray Media; (Gray Television Licensee, LLC)
- Sister stations: WGEM-TV

History
- First air date: August 1, 1947
- Former call signs: WQDI (1947–1953)
- Call sign meaning: Gem City (civic slogan of Quincy)

Technical information
- Licensing authority: FCC
- Facility ID: 54281
- Class: B
- ERP: 26,500 watts
- HAAT: 209 meters (686 ft)
- Transmitter coordinates: 39°57′4.2″N 91°19′53.5″W

Links
- Public license information: Public file; LMS
- Webcast: Listen live
- Website: www.wgem.com/about-us/radio/

WGEM-FM (105.1 MHz; "Sports Radio 105.1") is a radio station in Quincy, Illinois, broadcasting a sports radio format.

Since 2023, WGEM-FM is the only radio station owned by Gray Media — owner of WGEM-TV in Quincy — which primarily owns television stations (and is the third-largest owner of television stations in the U.S.). It is affiliated with ESPN Radio.

== History ==
The station signed on August 1, 1947, as WQDI. It was Quincy Newspapers' first broadcasting station, signing on five months before WGEM; it was also the first FM station in the market. The WQDI callsign was retained until 1953, when the station became WGEM-FM to match the AM station and WGEM-TV.

Logo as "News Talk 105"

For much of its early history, WGEM-FM was a simulcast of WGEM. This ended by 1976, when the station implemented a country music format; "Gem Country" lasted until 2002, when it gave way to a news/talk format.

On February 1, 2021, Gray Television announced that it had entered into an agreement to acquire all Quincy Media television and radio properties for $925 million in a cash transaction. This included WGEM (AM) and WGEM-FM, as well as WGEM-TV. The acquisition was completed on August 2. At the time of the acquisition, Gray's only other radio property was KTXC in Lamesa, Texas, which was in the process of being divested in an unrelated concurrent deal; by 2023, the WGEM radio stations were the only radio stations in Gray's holdings.

In the later years of the news/talk format, WGEM-FM's programming was primarily centered around the local morning show "News Talk Live!", as well as simulcasts of WGEM-TV's newscasts and NBC Nightly News. Syndicated programming included Classic Radio Theater, Dave Ramsey, Markley, Van Camp and Robbins, Ben Shapiro, and Red Eye Radio.

WGEM-FM dropped the news/talk format in favor of the sports radio programming previously heard on WGEM, primarily supplied by ESPN Radio, on March 1, 2023. The AM station had gone off the air in June 2022 due to technical problems; its programming had continued to be heard on FM translator W255CY (98.9), which shut down on March 1. The station continues to air weather updates and breaking news coverage. While most of WGEM's programming, including the local "WGEM SportsCenter" morning program, Quincy University athletics, and high school sports, moved to WGEM-FM, the FM station's existing carriage of St. Louis Cardinals baseball was retained in lieu of WGEM's affiliation with the Chicago Cubs. Competing talk station WTAD immediately acquired the rights to carry The Dave Ramsey Show.
