= WGEM (AM) =

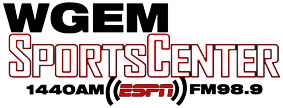
- Quincy, Illinois; United States
- Broadcast area: Quincy, Illinois; Hannibal, Missouri; Keokuk, Iowa
- Frequency: 1440 kHz
- Branding: WGEM Sports Radio

Programming
- Format: Defunct, was sports

Ownership
- Owner: Gray Television; (Gray Television Licensee, LLC)
- Sister stations: WGEM-FM, WGEM-TV

History
- First air date: January 1, 1948
- Last air date: June 24, 2022; 3 years ago (Note: The 98.9 translator continued to air WGEM's programming until March 1, 2023.)
- Call sign meaning: "Gem City"

Technical information
- Facility ID: 54277
- Class: B
- Power: 5,000 watts day; 1,000 watts night
- Transmitter coordinates: 39°58′48.2″N 91°19′24.5″W
- Translator: 98.9 W255CY (Quincy)

Links
- Webcast: Listen live
- Website: www.wgem.com

WGEM (1440 AM) was a radio station in Quincy, Illinois, broadcasting a sports radio format. The station was owned by Gray Television and was an affiliate of ESPN Radio. The station also broadcast via FM translator W255CY, 98.9 FM, licensed to Quincy.

== FM translator ==
In addition to the main station at 1440 kHz, WGEM was relayed to an FM translator broadcasting at 98.9 MHz.

| Call sign | Frequency | City of license | FID | ERP (W) | Class | Transmitter coordinates | FCC info |
|---|---|---|---|---|---|---|---|
| W255CY | 98.9 FM | Quincy, Illinois | 156892 | 250 | D | 39°57′4.2″N 91°19′53.5″W | LMS |

== History ==
WGEM signed on January 1, 1948; its debut was hampered by an ice storm that forced the station off the air just twenty minutes into its first broadcast. The station was owned by Quincy Broadcasting Company, which was purchased by a partnership of transmitter manufacturer Parker Gates and Quincy Newspapers a few months later. Gates had previously attempted to enter station ownership by applying for a new station, WFAR, which was never built; meanwhile, WGEM was Quincy Newspapers' second broadcast property, as the company had launched FM radio station WQDI (105.1 FM) on August 1, 1947. Quincy Newspapers would assume full ownership of the station in 1950, after Gates chose to sell his stake in Quincy Broadcasting to focus exclusively on manufacturing. (WQDI would become WGEM-FM in 1953 to match the AM station and the then-new WGEM-TV; it would eventually become a simulcast of WGEM.) The station became an affiliate of the ABC Radio Network on October 1, 1948.

By 1976, when WGEM-FM broke away from its simulcast and became a country music station, WGEM had a middle-of-the-road format; that year, the station became one of the first AM stereo stations. It shifted to adult contemporary in 1980; in the early 1990s, the station again changed formats, this time to talk radio. During the Great Flood of 1993, WGEM provided comprehensive coverage, temporarily suspending its normal programming to provide updates on bridge closures, flood stages, and levee status.

In 2002, WGEM began to shift its format: its news/talk programming was moved to WGEM-FM, and the AM station adopted a sports radio format; it had carried ESPN Radio at night under the previous format. However, much of WGEM-FM's primarily news-oriented local programming, as well as Paul Harvey and NBC Nightly News, continued to be simulcast on the AM station for several years thereafter; this was finally largely phased out in 2005.

WGEM's schedule was primarily sourced from ESPN Radio; it did air a local morning program, WGEM SportsCenter. Other local programming, generally relating to local sports (including coach's shows for Quincy University and Quincy Senior High School basketball) was carried during their seasons. WGEM also carried Chicago Cubs baseball and Chicago Bulls basketball.

On February 1, 2021, Gray Television announced that it had entered into an agreement to acquire all Quincy Media television and radio properties for $925 million in a cash transaction. This included WGEM and WGEM-FM, as well as WGEM-TV. The acquisition was completed on August 2. At the time of the acquisition, Gray's only other radio property was KTXC in Lamesa, Texas, which was in the process of being divested in an unrelated concurrent deal; by 2023, the WGEM radio stations were the only radio stations in Gray's holdings.

The AM 1440 facility went off the air June 24, 2022, after equipment failures, including the loss of WGEM's primary and backup transmitters; its programming would continue on the 98.9 translator. On February 16, 2023, Gray Television announced that WGEM and the translator would be shut down entirely effective March 1; the sports format moved to WGEM-FM, replacing its news/talk programming. Both the AM station's and the translator's licenses were surrendered for cancellation and cancelled on March 8, 2023.

While most of WGEM's programming was relocated to WGEM-FM, the shutdown of the AM station left the Chicago Cubs, which WGEM had carried since 1985, without a radio affiliate in Quincy, with the nearest affiliates now WLDS in Jacksonville, Illinois, and KCPS in Burlington, Iowa. WGEM-FM continued its existing carriage of the St. Louis Cardinals.
