= WGEM-TV =

Television station in Quincy, Illinois

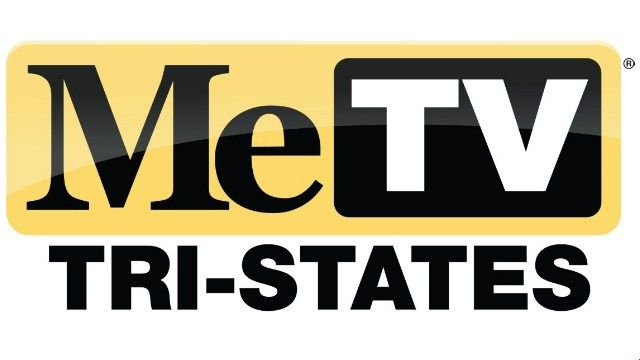
- Quincy, Illinois; Hannibal, Missouri; Keokuk, Iowa; United States
- City: Quincy, Illinois
- Channels: Digital: 19 (UHF); Virtual: 10
- Branding: WGEM (general); WGEM-NBC (10.1); Tri-States CW (10.2); WGEM-Fox (10.3); MeTV Tri-States (10.4)

Programming
- Affiliations: 10.1: NBC; 10.2: CW+; 10.3: Fox; 10.4: MeTV/MyNetworkTV

Ownership
- Owner: Gray Media; (Gray Television Licensee, LLC)
- Sister stations: WGEM-FM

History
- First air date: September 4, 1953
- Former channel numbers: Analog: 10 (VHF, 1953–2009); Digital: 54 (UHF, 2001–2009), 10 (VHF, 2009–2024)
- Former affiliations: Both secondary: ABC (1953–1969, 1971–c. 1995); Fox (1990–1994)
- Call sign meaning: Gem City (civic slogan of Quincy)

Technical information
- Licensing authority: FCC
- Facility ID: 54275
- ERP: 1,000 kW
- HAAT: 238 m (781 ft)
- Transmitter coordinates: 39°57′4″N 91°19′54″W

Links
- Public license information: Public file; LMS
- Website: www.wgem.com

WGEM-TV (channel 10) is a television station licensed to Quincy, Illinois, United States, serving the Quincy, Illinois–Hannibal, Missouri–Keokuk, Iowa market as an affiliate of NBC, The CW Plus, Fox, and MyNetworkTV. Owned by Gray Media, it is sister to the company's sole radio property, sports station WGEM-FM (105.1). The two stations share studios in the New Tremont Apartments (formerly the Hotel Quincy) on Hampshire Street in downtown Quincy. WGEM-TV's transmitter is located east of the city on Cannonball Road near I-172.

Until August 2, 2021, WGEM-TV served as the flagship television property of founding owner Quincy Media, and was sister to the company's namesake newspaper, The Quincy Herald-Whig.

== History ==
WGEM-TV's license was originally granted to Quincy Broadcasting Company, a subsidiary of the Herald-Whig; it was allotted channel 10. The station was originally affiliated with NBC and ABC, while being represented by Walker Representation Co. Quincy Broadcasting's president at the time was T. C. Oakley; Joe Bonansinga was the station's founding general manager. The station received their DuMont transmitters on the same truck as nearby KHQA-TV (channel 7) on July 27, 1953. The crews competed to see who could get on the air first. WGEM began interim broadcasting two hours per night on September 4, 1953.

During the 1960s, WGEM shared its secondary ABC affiliation with CBS affiliate KHQA-TV. This arrangement ended in 1969, when WJJY-TV in Jacksonville, Illinois, went on the air as the ABC affiliate for Quincy; when WJJY went bankrupt and shut down in 1971, WGEM resumed carrying a few ABC shows until the mid-1990s. The station also had a secondary affiliation with Fox between 1990 and 1994, after which the station moved its Fox affiliation to a separate cable-only channel.

Until 2021, WGEM-TV was the only locally owned and operated station in the market. It was also one of the few and longest operating television stations in the country, outside of network owned-and-operated stations, that had the same call letters, owner, channel number, and primary network affiliation throughout its history.

Since the mid-to-late 1990s, WGEM has branded almost exclusively with its call letters.

On February 1, 2021, Gray Television announced that it had entered into an agreement to acquire most of Quincy Media's television properties for $925 million in a cash transaction. The acquisition was completed on August 2, resulting in the first ownership change for WGEM-TV since its 1953 sign-on.

== Subchannel history ==
=== WGEM-DT2 ===
WGEM-DT2 is the CW+-affiliated second digital subchannel of WGEM-TV, broadcasting in 720p high definition on channel 10.2.

==== History ====
WGEM-DT2 began broadcasting as a WB affiliate in September 1998. It was a cable-only station, and as a result, had the fictional call letters "WEWB". The station was part of The WB 100+ group. Fellow CW affiliate WCWN in Albany, New York, held the actual WEWB call sign when it was a WB affiliate. Prior to September 1998, the Quincy market received WB programming on cable via the national feed of Chicago-based WGN-TV, which carried WB programming until 1999. Following the 2006 merger of UPN and the WB, "WEWB", which began using the WGEM-DT2 callsign in an official manner, began airing programming from The CW. The station became part of The CW Plus, a service that is a similar operation to The WB 100+. Like all CW Plus affiliates in the Central Time Zone, WGEM-DT2 aired the nationally syndicated morning show The Daily Buzz on weekdays from 5:00 am to 8:00 am.

=== WGEM-DT3 ===
WGEM-DT3, branded on-air as WGEM Fox, is the Fox-affiliated third digital subchannel of WGEM-TV, broadcasting in 720p high definition on channel 10.3.

==== History ====
Original CGEM logo, used from 1994 to 2006.

What is now WGEM-DT3 was established in 1994 by WGEM on Continental Cablevision to fill a void in a market where there was no local over-the-air Fox affiliate. Between 1990 and 1994, Fox programming in the market was limited to off-hours on WGEM's analog signal. It was originally a cable-only station; as a result, it was known on-air with the fictional "CGEM" calls based after the "C" in Continental and "GEM" in WGEM. The station, which was the only Fox-affiliated cable channel to have not been a part of Foxnet, began to air on the third digital subchannel of WGEM-TV in 2006. This was one of the first instances of a major network affiliate operating a cable-only affiliate of another network; this would eventually be repeated on a national level with the launch of The WB 100+ Station Group in September 1998. As part of becoming available over-the-air, it began to use the WGEM-DT3 call sign in an official manner; nonetheless, the "CGEM" branding was retained until 2010. The station remains as the only Fox affiliate in the area, although Charter Spectrum in Hannibal, Missouri, also carries KTVI from St. Louis.

=== WGEM-DT4 ===
WGEM-DT4, branded on air as MeTV Tri-States, is the MeTV-affiliated fourth digital subchannel of WGEM-TV, broadcasting in 720p high definition on channel 10.4. The subchannel also carries MyNetworkTV programming on weeknights from 1 a.m. to 3 a.m.

== News operation ==
Currently, WGEM-TV airs 25 hours of news per week. WGEM-TV once produced a weeknight 9 p.m. newscast for its then cable-only Fox sister station. Known as CGEM News at 9, it debuted in April 2006 but was canceled in March 2007. The broadcast was anchored by Jake Miller with chief meteorologist Rich Cain and sports director Ben Marth. At one point, WGEM-DT2 simulcast WGEM-FM's weekday morning show, WGEM Sunrise: Radio Edition. Today it re-airs one WGEM-produced weekly public affairs show, City Desk, along with one other locally produced program, WGEM Academic Challenge. In addition to its main studios, the station used to operate a bureau on South Randolph Street in Macomb, Illinois, but it was closed in 2008. Like all CW Plus affiliates in the Central Time Zone, WGEM-DT2 aired the nationally syndicated morning show The Daily Buzz on weekdays from 5 to 8 a.m.

== Technical information ==
=== Subchannels ===
The station's signal is multiplexed:

Subchannels of WGEM-TV
Subchannel	Res.	Short name	Programming
10.1	1080i	WGEMNBC	NBC
10.2	720p	WGEM CW	The CW Plus
10.3	720p	WGEMFOX	Fox
10.4	720p	WGEMMe	MeTV (primary); MyNetworkTV (secondary)

WGEM-TV shut down its analog signal, over VHF channel 10, on February 19, 2009, two days after the original target date when full-power television stations in the United States were to transition from analog to digital broadcasts under federal mandate (which was later pushed back to June 12, 2009). The station's digital signal relocated from its pre-transition ultra high frequency (UHF) channel 54, which was among the high band UHF channels (52–69) that were removed from broadcasting use as a result of the transition, to its analog-era VHF channel 10.

== See also ==
- Channel 10 digital TV stations in the United States
- Channel 10 virtual TV stations in the United States
