= WTAD =

Radio station in Quincy, Illinois

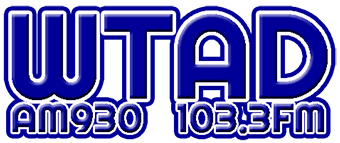
- Quincy, Illinois; United States
- Broadcast area: Quincy / Hannibal / Keokuk
- Frequency: 930 kHz
- Branding: "WTAD AM 930 FM 103.3"

Programming
- Format: News talk
- Affiliations: Fox News Radio; Compass Media Networks; Premiere Networks; Westwood One

Ownership
- Owner: STARadio Corporation
- Sister stations: KGRC, KZZK, WCOY, WQCY

History
- First air date: 1923 (original license); July 8, 1925 (relicensed)
- Former frequencies: 1310 (1923); 1270 kHz (1925–1928); 1440 kHz (1928–1935); 900 kHz (1935–1941)
- Call sign meaning: We Travel All Directions (slogan based on randomly assigned call letters)

Technical information
- Licensing authority: FCC
- Facility ID: 64839
- Class: B
- Power: 5,000 watts day; 1,000 watts night
- Transmitter coordinates: 39°53′23.00″N 91°25′24.00″W
- Translator: 103.3 K277CF (Quincy)

Links
- Public license information: Public file; LMS
- Webcast: Listen live
- Website: www.wtad.com

WTAD (930 AM) is a commercial radio station licensed to Quincy, Illinois and owned by STARadio Corporation.

WTAD broadcasts a news talk format. It carries a variety of local programming, as well as nationally syndicated shows such as Dave Ramsey, Mark Levin, and Coast to Coast AM.

== History ==
WTAD was first licensed on July 20, 1923, to Robert E. Compton and First Presbyterian Church in Carthage, Illinois. The call sign was randomly assigned from a sequential roster of available call letters. The station was deleted on December 18, 1923, then relicensed on July 8, 1925, to Robert E. Compton in Carthage, broadcasting on 1270 kHz, with a power of 50 watts.

In December 1926, the license was transferred to the Illinois Stock Medicine Broadcasting Corporation, and the station was moved to Quincy, Illinois, with its power increased to 500 watts. Following the establishment of the Federal Radio Commission (FRC), stations were initially issued a series of temporary authorizations starting on May 3, 1927. In addition, they were informed that if they wanted to continue operating, they needed to file a formal license application by January 15, 1928, as the first step in determining whether they met the new "public interest, convenience, or necessity" standard. On May 25, 1928, the FRC issued General Order 32, which notified 164 stations, including WTAD, that "From an examination of your application for future license it does not find that public interest, convenience, or necessity would be served by granting it." However, the station successfully convinced the commission that it should remain licensed.

On November 11, 1928, the FRC implemented a major reallocation of station transmitting frequencies, as part of a reorganization resulting from its implementation of General Order 40. WTAD's frequency was changed to 1440 kHz, sharing time on the frequency with WMBD in Peoria. In 1935, the station's frequency was changed to 900 kHz, running 500 watts during daytime hours only. In 1936, the station's power was increased to 1,000 watts. In 1941, nighttime operations were added, running 1,000 watts with a directional array, and the station's frequency was changed to 930 kHz.

By 1941, the station had become an affiliate of the CBS Radio Network. In 1944, the station was sold to Lee Broadcasting for $487,500. In 1952, the station's daytime power was increased to 5,000 watts. In the 1970s and 1980s, the station aired a MOR format. By 1986, news-talk programming was added. In December 1986, the station was sold to Eastern Broadcasting, along with 99.5 WQCY, for $1.1 million. In 1989, Eastern Broadcasting was purchased by TMZ Broadcasting (later known as Tele-Media Broadcasting). In Spring 1994, the station's format was changed from soft AC to oldies.

In the fall of 1994, the station's format changed from full service/oldies to an all-talk format. In 1997, Tele-Media was purchased by Citadel. In 1997, the station's programming began to be simulcast on 106.7 WBRJ in Mount Sterling, Illinois. In 1998, the station was sold to STARadio Corporation. In 1999, the station's simulcast ended, after 106.7 was sold and switched to an oldies format as WLRT "Golden 106.7".
