= WCOY =

Radio station in Quincy, Illinois

- Quincy, Illinois; United States
- Frequency: 99.5 MHz
- Branding: WCOY 99.5

Programming
- Format: Country
- Affiliations: Compass Media Networks; Premiere Networks; Westwood One

Ownership
- Owner: STARadio Corporation

History
- First air date: 1948; 78 years ago
- Former call signs: WTAD-FM (1948–1974); WQCY (1974–1999)
- Call sign meaning: Coyote Country

Technical information
- Licensing authority: FCC
- Class: C1
- ERP: 100,000 watts
- HAAT: 149 meters (489 ft)
- Transmitter coordinates: 39°56′30.00″N 91°35′3.00″W

Links
- Public license information: Public file; LMS
- Website: wcoy.com

WCOY (99.5 FM) is a 100,000-watt radio station based in Quincy, Illinois with a country music format. The station is owned by STARadio Corporation.

== History ==
WTAD-FM went on the air in 1948, four years after having filed for its construction permit on 44.1 MHz—before FM was relocated to 88–108 MHz. It was owned by Lee Enterprises as a sister to WTAD 930 AM. When Lee-owned KHQA-TV signed on in 1953, it did so from WTAD-FM's tower, standing 804 feet (245 m) above the surrounding flat terrain.

When New York's WBAI—also on 99.5—was sabotaged and fell off air in 1967, it borrowed a crystal from WTAD-FM in order to resume operation. WTAD-FM became WQCY on December 30, 1974.

Lee exited the Hannibal-Quincy market in 1986, selling KHQA-TV to Benedek Broadcasting and WTAD-WQCY radio for $1.1 million to Noble Broadcast Corporation, which operated as Eastern Broadcasting. The group was purchased three years later (later known as Tele-Media Broadcasting). In 1997, Tele-Media was purchased by Citadel; Citadel sold its Quincy cluster the next year to STARadio Corporation. In 1999, the hot AC format and callsign WQCY moved to 103.9 FM, formerly WMOS; programming consultant Keith Bansemer flipped the station's format to country using the "Coyote Country" slogan.

== See also ==
- List of media outlets in Quincy, Illinois
