= STARadio Corporation =

Radio broadcast company

STARadio is a radio broadcast company that owns several radio stations throughout the United States in the cities of Quincy and Kankakee, IL as well as stations in Great Falls, Montana.

== Radio stations ==
- KGRC
- KINX
- KZZK
- WCOY
- WKAN
- WQCY
- WTAD
- WYKT
