= Hannibal, Missouri =

City in Missouri, US

- City
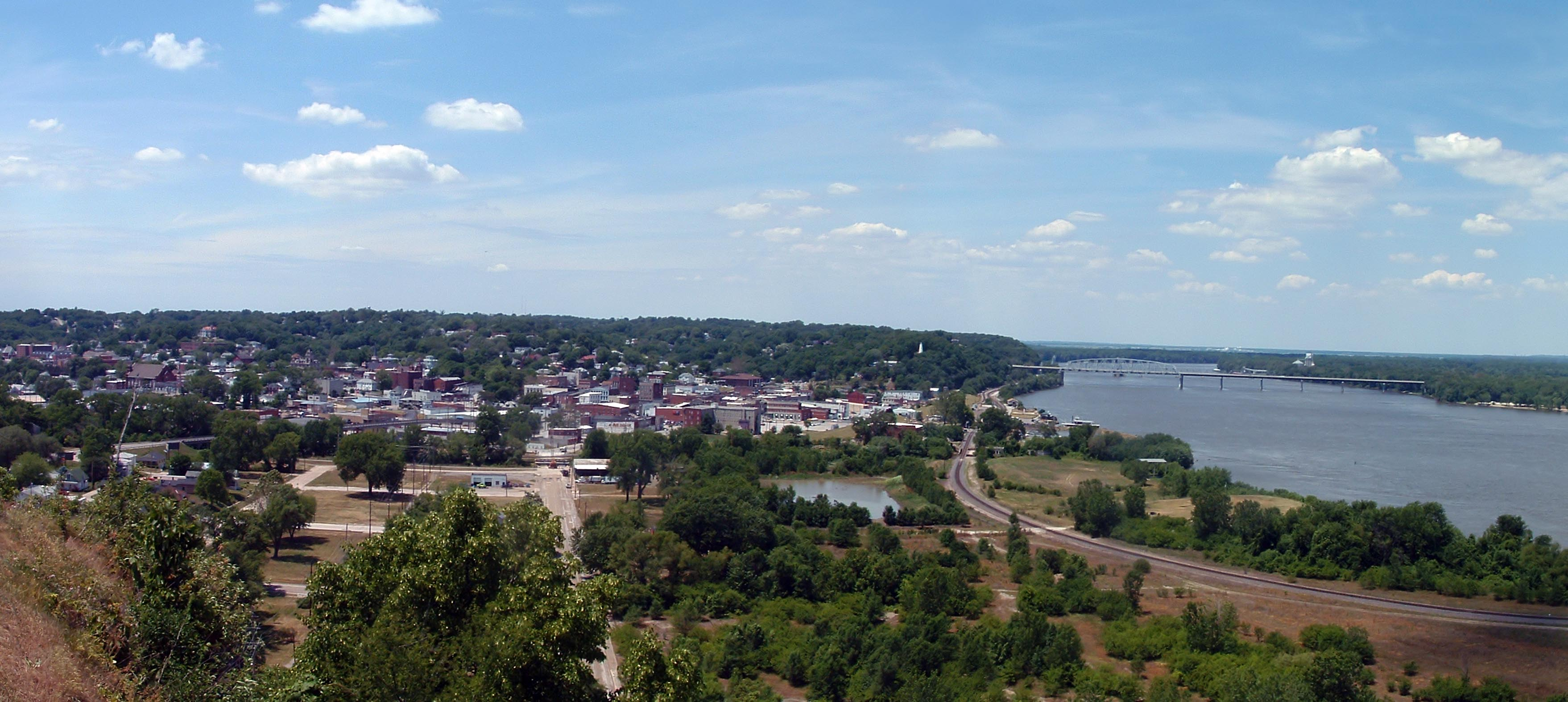
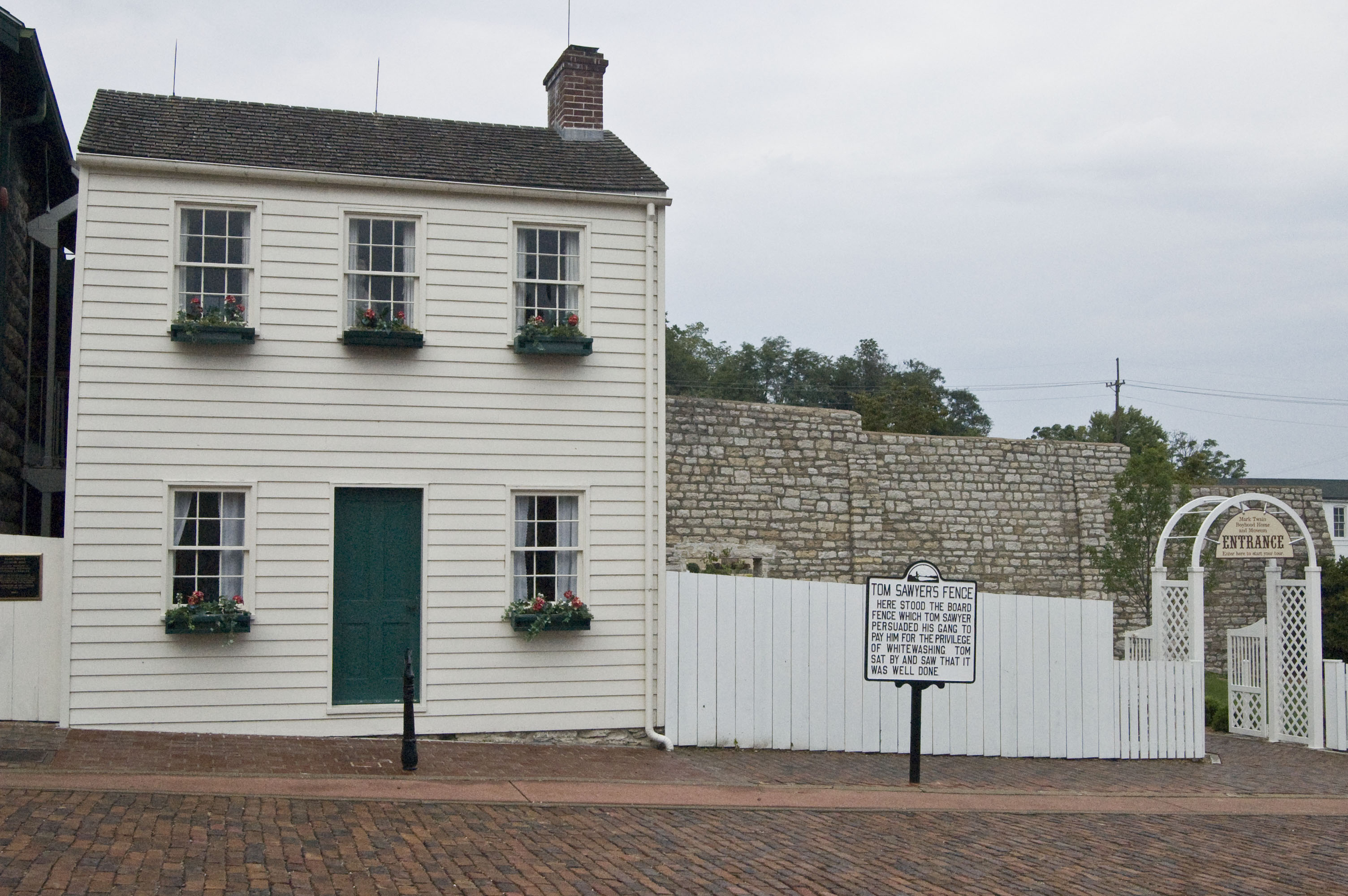
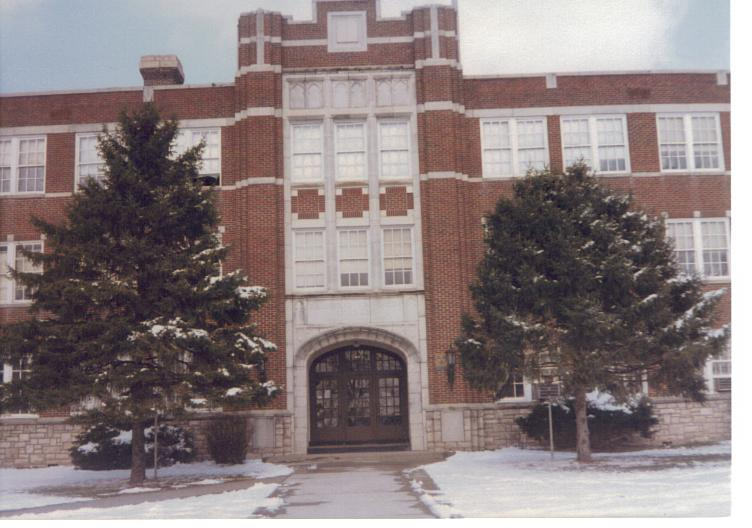
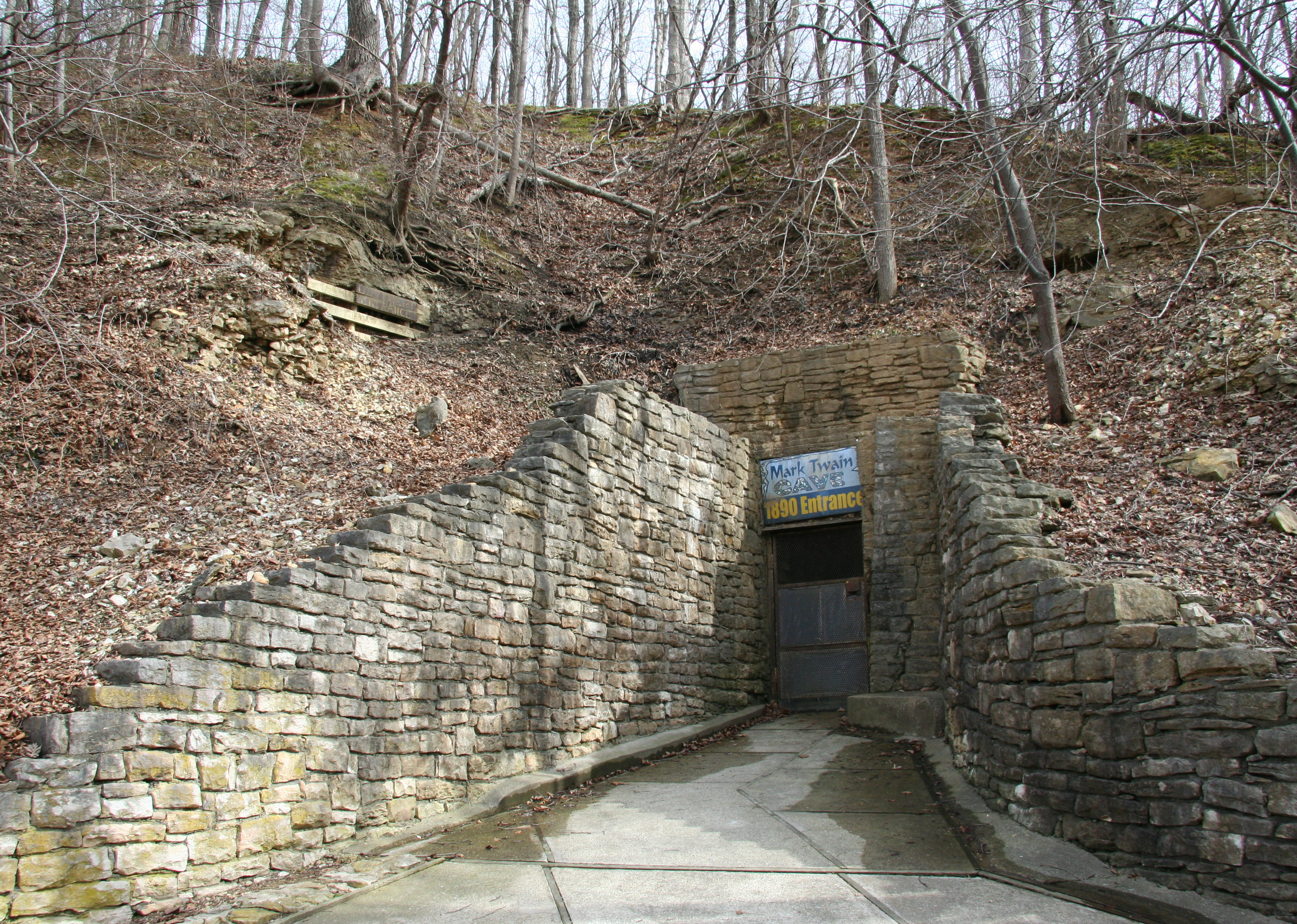
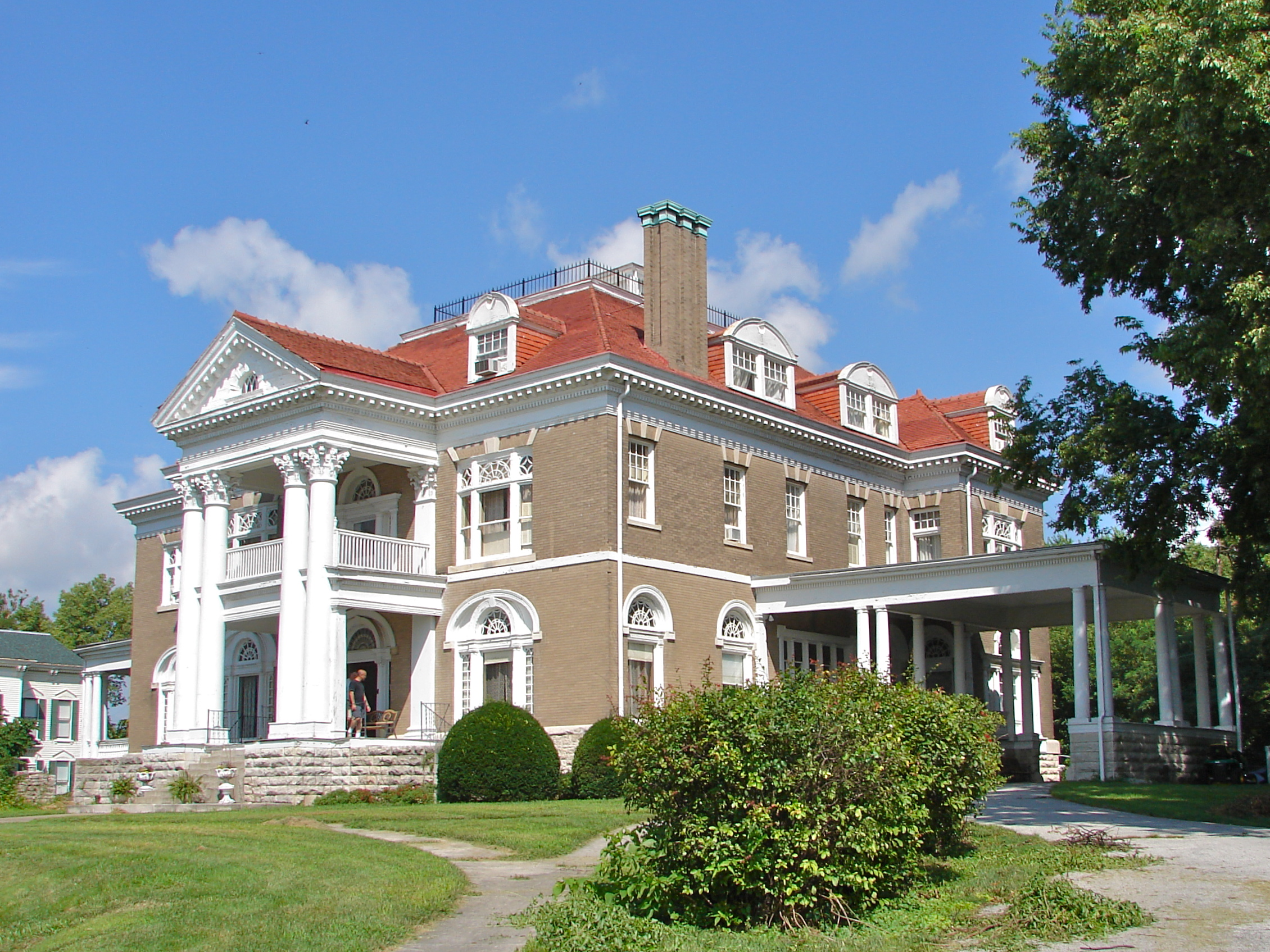
- Downtown Hannibal and the Mississippi River viewed from Lover's Leap Mark Twain Boyhood Home & Museum Hannibal–LaGrange University Mark Twain Cave Rockcliffe Mansion

- Seal Logo
- Nickname: America's Hometown
- Location within Marion County (left) and Missouri (right)

- Location within Missouri Location within the United States
- Coordinates: 39°42′35″N 91°23′38″W
- Country: United States
- State: Missouri
- Counties: Marion, Ralls
- Platted: 1819
- Incorporated: 1845

Government
  - Type: City manager and council
  - Mayor: Darrell McCoy
  - City manager: Andy Dorian

Area
  - Total: 16.47 sq mi (42.66 km^{2})
  - Land: 16.00 sq mi (41.44 km^{2})
  - Water: 0.47 sq mi (1.21 km^{2})
- Elevation: 646 ft (197 m)

Population (2020)
  - Total: 17,108
  - Estimate (2023): 16,838
  - Density: 1,052.2/sq mi (406.3/km^{2})
- Time zone: UTC-6 (CST)
  - Summer (DST): UTC-5 (CDT)
- ZIP code: 63401
- Area code: 573
- FIPS code: 29-30214
- GNIS feature ID: 2394287
- Website: www.hannibal-mo.gov

Hannibal is a city along the Mississippi River in Marion and Ralls counties in Missouri, United States. According to the 2020 U.S. census, the population was 17,108, making it the largest city in Marion County. The bulk of the city is in Marion County, with a tiny sliver in the south extending into Ralls County.

Nestled on the Mississippi River, commerce and traffic has long been an integral part of Hannibal's development, including by river, rail and the interstate/highway system. Today the city is intersected by Interstate 72 and U.S. Routes 24, 36, and 61. Hannibal is approximately 110 miles (180 km) northwest of St. Louis (also bordering the Mississippi), 195 miles (314 km) east-northeast of Kansas City and 194 miles (312 km) miles east of Saint Joseph (both cities on the Missouri River), and approximately 100 miles (160 km) west of Springfield, Illinois.

Hannibal is not the county seat, but it has one of two county courthouses. There is also one in Palmyra, the county seat of Marion County, which is located more centrally in the county. Hannibal is the principal city of the Hannibal, Missouri micropolitan area, which consists of both Marion and Ralls counties.

== History ==
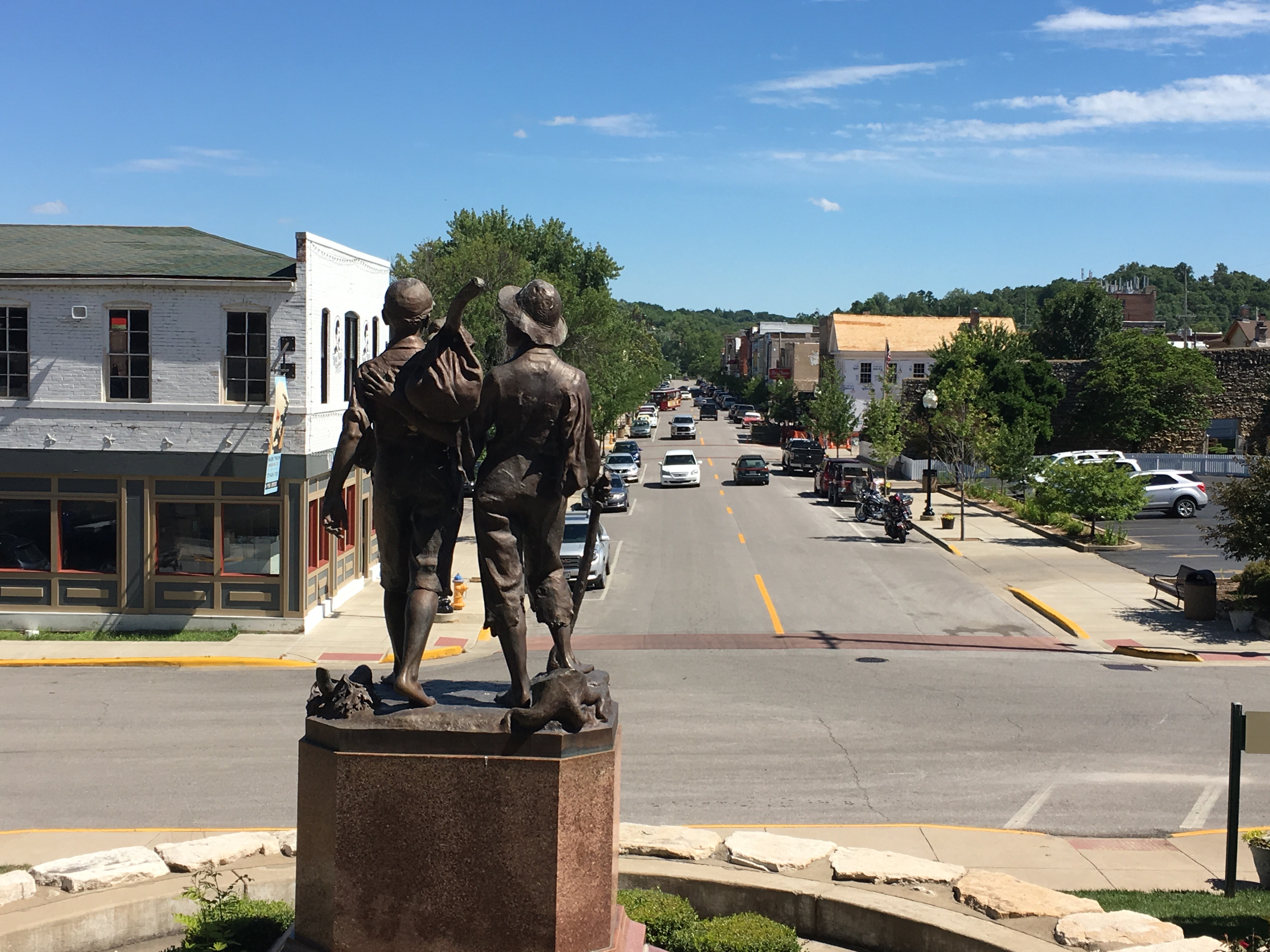
Tom Sawyer and Huck Finn at the Foot of Cardiff Hill (1926), by Frederick Hibbard

The site of Hannibal was originally inhabited by various cultures of indigenous Native American tribes. Hannibal is home to Osterhout Mounds Park, a preservation of ancient Indian burial mounds.

The river community was the mid-19th-century boyhood home of author Samuel Langhorne Clemens (aka Mark Twain, 1835–1910). Twain drew from his childhood settings for his novels The Adventures of Tom Sawyer (1876) and Adventures of Huckleberry Finn (1884). Numerous historical sites are associated with Mark Twain and the places depicted in his fiction.

Heritage tourism contributes to the Hannibal economy, as the city attracts both American and international tourists. The Mark Twain Boyhood Home & Museum marked its 100th anniversary in 2012; it has had visitors from all 50 states and some 60 countries.

Hannibal is also the birthplace of Margaret Brown, posthumously known as the "Unsinkable Molly Brown". The cottage where Brown was born is now the Molly Brown Birthplace and Museum.

=== Background ===
After the United States acquired the Louisiana Territory west of the Mississippi in 1803, European-American settlers began to enter the area. Its earlier European settlements were established by ethnic French colonists, some from Illinois, who largely spoke French and were Roman Catholic in religion.

Hannibal was laid out in 1819 by Moses Bates and named after Hannibal Creek (later Bear Creek). The name is derived from Hannibal, a hero of ancient Carthage (in modern Tunisia).

The city grew slowly, with a population of 30 by 1830. But by 1846, Hannibal was Missouri's third-largest city when the Hannibal and St. Joseph Railroad was organized by John M. Clemens (Mark Twain's father) and associates. This railway was built to connect to St. Joseph, Missouri, in the west, then the state's second-largest city. This railroad was the westernmost line before the Transcontinental Railroad was constructed. It transported mail for delivery to the first outpost of the Pony Express.

Construction of railroads to the area and increased steamboats on the Mississippi River had stimulated growth. In 1843 the city had also annexed the town of South Hannibal. Hannibal gained "city" status by 1845. By 1850 it had 2,020 residents.

In the late 19th and early 20th centuries, the city served as a regional marketing center for livestock and grain, as well as other products produced locally, such as cement and shoes. Cement for the Empire State Building (completed 1931) and Panama Canal was manufactured at the Atlas Portland Cement Company in the nearby unincorporated company town of Ilasco.

The Mark Twain Memorial Lighthouse was constructed in 1933 as a public works project under President Franklin D. Roosevelt. It has been lit on ceremonial occasions at three separate times by Presidents Roosevelt, John F. Kennedy, and Bill Clinton. Rockcliffe Mansion, a private house on a knoll in Hannibal, is listed on the National Register of Historic Places.

In 2011, the Mark Twain Boyhood Home and Museum released Mark Twain: Words & Music, a CD featuring entertainers who recount Mark Twain's life in spoken word and song. Several songs were written especially for the project and refer to Hannibal, including "Huck Finn Blues" by Brad Paisley and "Run Mississippi" by Rhonda Vincent. Other artists include Jimmy Buffett as Huckleberry Finn, Clint Eastwood as Twain, and Garrison Keillor as the narrator of the project.

== Geography ==
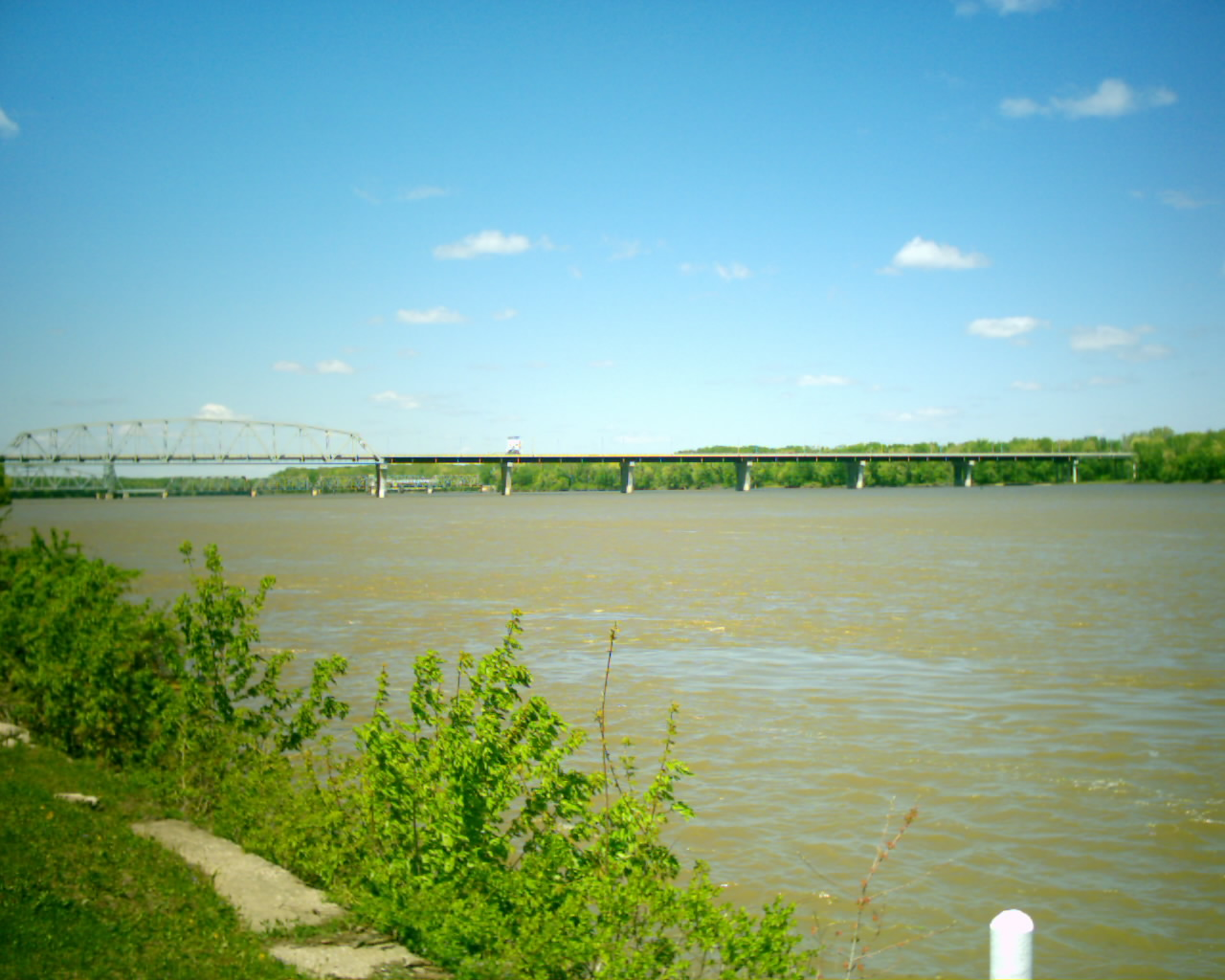
The Mississippi River at Hannibal, April 2005

Hannibal is on the west side of the Mississippi River in southeastern Marion County and is situated across the river from East Hannibal, Illinois. The next city upriver is Quincy, Illinois, 17 miles (27 km) to the north, while the next city downriver is Louisiana, Missouri, 25 miles (40 km) to the south.

According to the U.S. Census Bureau, Hannibal has a total area of 16.47 square miles (42.66 km^{2}), of which 16.00 square miles (41.44 km^{2}) are land and 0.47 square miles (1.22 km^{2}), or 2.84%, are water.

=== Climate ===
Hannibal's climate is hot-summer humid continental (Dfa), with cold, snowy winters and hot, humid summers. Three months average below freezing, seven months average above 50 °F, and three months average above 22 °C.

Climate data for Hannibal Water Works, Missouri (1991–2020 normals, extremes 1902–present)
Month	Jan	Feb	Mar	Apr	May	Jun	Jul	Aug	Sep	Oct	Nov	Dec	Year
Record high °F (°C)	77 (25)	81 (27)	91 (33)	93 (34)	104 (40)	104 (40)	114 (46)	110 (43)	102 (39)	95 (35)	83 (28)	76 (24)	114 (46)
Mean daily maximum °F (°C)	34.6 (1.4)	39.6 (4.2)	51.4 (10.8)	63.7 (17.6)	73.3 (22.9)	82.1 (27.8)	85.7 (29.8)	84.4 (29.1)	77.9 (25.5)	65.7 (18.7)	51.5 (10.8)	39.3 (4.1)	62.4 (16.9)
Daily mean °F (°C)	26.3 (−3.2)	30.6 (−0.8)	41.7 (5.4)	53.2 (11.8)	63.6 (17.6)	72.8 (22.7)	76.5 (24.7)	74.8 (23.8)	67.4 (19.7)	55.3 (12.9)	42.5 (5.8)	31.4 (−0.3)	53.0 (11.7)
Mean daily minimum °F (°C)	17.9 (−7.8)	21.6 (−5.8)	32.0 (0.0)	42.8 (6.0)	54.0 (12.2)	63.5 (17.5)	67.3 (19.6)	65.2 (18.4)	56.9 (13.8)	44.9 (7.2)	33.5 (0.8)	23.4 (−4.8)	43.6 (6.4)
Record low °F (°C)	−21 (−29)	−25 (−32)	−9 (−23)	11 (−12)	30 (−1)	43 (6)	48 (9)	40 (4)	30 (−1)	13 (−11)	−6 (−21)	−21 (−29)	−25 (−32)
Average precipitation inches (mm)	2.11 (54)	2.25 (57)	2.76 (70)	4.33 (110)	4.96 (126)	4.91 (125)	4.11 (104)	3.92 (100)	3.53 (90)	3.39 (86)	2.82 (72)	2.19 (56)	41.28 (1,049)
Average precipitation days (≥ 0.01 in)	8.4	7.8	9.9	11.4	12.7	10.3	8.3	8.0	7.6	9.0	8.4	8.4	110.2
Source: NOAA

== Demographics ==
Historical population
Census	Pop.	Note	%±
1850	2,020		—
1860	6,505		222.0%
1870	10,125		55.6%
1880	11,074		9.4%
1890	12,857		16.1%
1900	12,780		−0.6%
1910	18,341		43.5%
1920	19,306		5.3%
1930	22,761		17.9%
1940	20,865		−8.3%
1950	20,444		−2.0%
1960	20,028		−2.0%
1970	18,609		−7.1%
1980	18,811		1.1%
1990	18,004		−4.3%
2000	17,757		−1.4%
2010	17,916		0.9%
2020	17,108		−4.5%
2025 (est.)	16,804		−1.8%
U.S. Decennial Census

The Hannibal Micropolitan Statistical Area is composed of Marion and Ralls counties.

=== 2020 census ===
As of the 2020 census, Hannibal had a population of 17,108. The median age was 39.0 years. 22.6% of residents were under the age of 18 and 18.6% of residents were 65 years of age or older. For every 100 females there were 89.8 males, and for every 100 females age 18 and over there were 86.4 males age 18 and over.

97.4% of residents lived in urban areas, while 2.6% lived in rural areas.

There were 6,922 households and 4,289 families in Hannibal, of which 28.3% had children under the age of 18 living in them. Of all households, 39.9% were married-couple households, 19.2% were households with a male householder and no spouse or partner present, and 32.5% were households with a female householder and no spouse or partner present. About 33.8% of all households were made up of individuals and 14.4% had someone living alone who was 65 years of age or older. The average household size was 2.3 and the average family size was 2.8.

There were 7,778 housing units, of which 11.0% were vacant. The homeowner vacancy rate was 2.1% and the rental vacancy rate was 10.8%.

Racial composition as of the 2020 census
Race	Number	Percent
White	14,509	84.8%
Black or African American	1,213	7.1%
American Indian and Alaska Native	66	0.4%
Asian	130	0.8%
Native Hawaiian and Other Pacific Islander	9	0.1%
Some other race	110	0.6%
Two or more races	1,071	6.3%
Hispanic or Latino (of any race)	401	2.3%

=== Income and poverty ===
The 2016–2020 5-year American Community Survey estimates show that the median household income was $46,504 (with a margin of error of +/- $2,507) and the median family income was $57,740 (+/- $5,451). Males had a median income of $33,537 (+/- $3,375) versus $22,147 (+/- $4,868) for females. The median income for those above 16 years old was $27,776 (+/- $1,949). Approximately, 10.6% of families and 19.1% of the population were below the poverty line, including 22.5% of those under the age of 18 and 11.7% of those ages 65 or over.

=== 2010 census ===
At the 2010 census, there were 17,916 people, 7,117 households, and 4,400 families living in the city. The population density was 1,138.2 inhabitants per square mile (439.5/km^{2}). There were 8,021 housing units at an average density of 509.6 per square mile (196.8/km^{2}). The racial makeup of the city was 88.8% White, 7.1% African American, 0.2% Native American, 0.6% Asian, 0.1% Pacific Islander, 0.5% from other races, and 2.7% from two or more races. Hispanic or Latino of any race were 1.8%.

Of the 7,117 households, 31.3% had children under the age of 18 living with them, 43.2% were married couples living together, 14.5% had a female householder with no husband present, 4.2% had a male householder with no wife present, and 38.2% were non-families. 31.6% of households were one person and 13% were one person aged 65 or older. The average household size was 2.36 and the average family size was 2.96.

The age distribution was 23.5% of residents were under the age of 18, 11.2% between the ages of 18 and 24, 24.4% from 25 to 44, 26% from 45 to 64, and 14.9% 65 or older. The median age was 37.3 years. The gender makeup of the city was 47.5% male and 52.5% female.

=== 2000 census ===
As of the census of 2000, there were 17,757 people, 7,017 households, and 4,554 families living in the city. The population density was 1,215.3 inhabitants per square mile (469.2/km^{2}). There were 7,886 housing units at an average density of 539.7 per square mile (208.4/km^{2}). The racial makeup of the city was 90.61% White, 6.57% African American, 0.35% Native American, 0.35% Asian, 0.07% Pacific Islander, 0.25% from other races, and 1.79% from two or more races. Hispanic or Latino of any race were 1.13% of the population. 25.9% were of American, 23.8% German, 10.9% Irish, and 10.0% English ancestry according to self-identification in Census 2000.

Of the 7,017 households 32.5% had children under the age of 18 living with them, 48.0% were married couples living together, 13.6% had a female householder with no husband present, and 35.1% were non-families. 30.6% of households were one person and 15.0% had someone living alone who was 65 years of age or older. The average household size was 2.40 and the average family size was 2.98.

The age distribution was 25.8% under the age of 18, 10.5% from 18 to 24, 26.3% from 25 to 44, 20.6% from 45 to 64, and 16.8% who were 65 years of age or older. The median age was 36 years. For every 100 females, there were 86.7 males. For every 100 females age 18 and over, there were 81.8 males.

The median household income was $29,892 and the median family income was $37,264. Males had a median income of $30,677 versus $20,828 for females. The per capita income for the city was $16,902. About 11.3% of families and 14.1% of the population were below the poverty line, including 18.2% of those under age 18 and 10.8% of those age 65 or over.

== Economy ==
An artist community has developed because of its central location between the East and West coasts, and affordable and stable real estate prices.

The Underwood Company built the General Mills plant here because its founder appreciated Mark Twain's writing and wanted to help his hometown.

Major employers include the Hannibal Regional Hospital and Hannibal Clinic. Major manufacturers include BASF Chemical Corporation (formally American Cyanamid), General Mills, and Watlow Electric Manufacturing Co.

Because Hannibal is a Missouri Certified Local Government, residents, and business owners have access to federal and state tax credits, grants, and other funding sources.

Tourism is a major part of Hannibal's economy, in large part because Samuel Clemens lived there as a boy and immortalized the town under his pen name, Mark Twain. The Mark Twain Boyhood Home & Museum and Mark Twain Cave are two of the city's major attractions.

== Arts and culture ==
=== Attractions ===
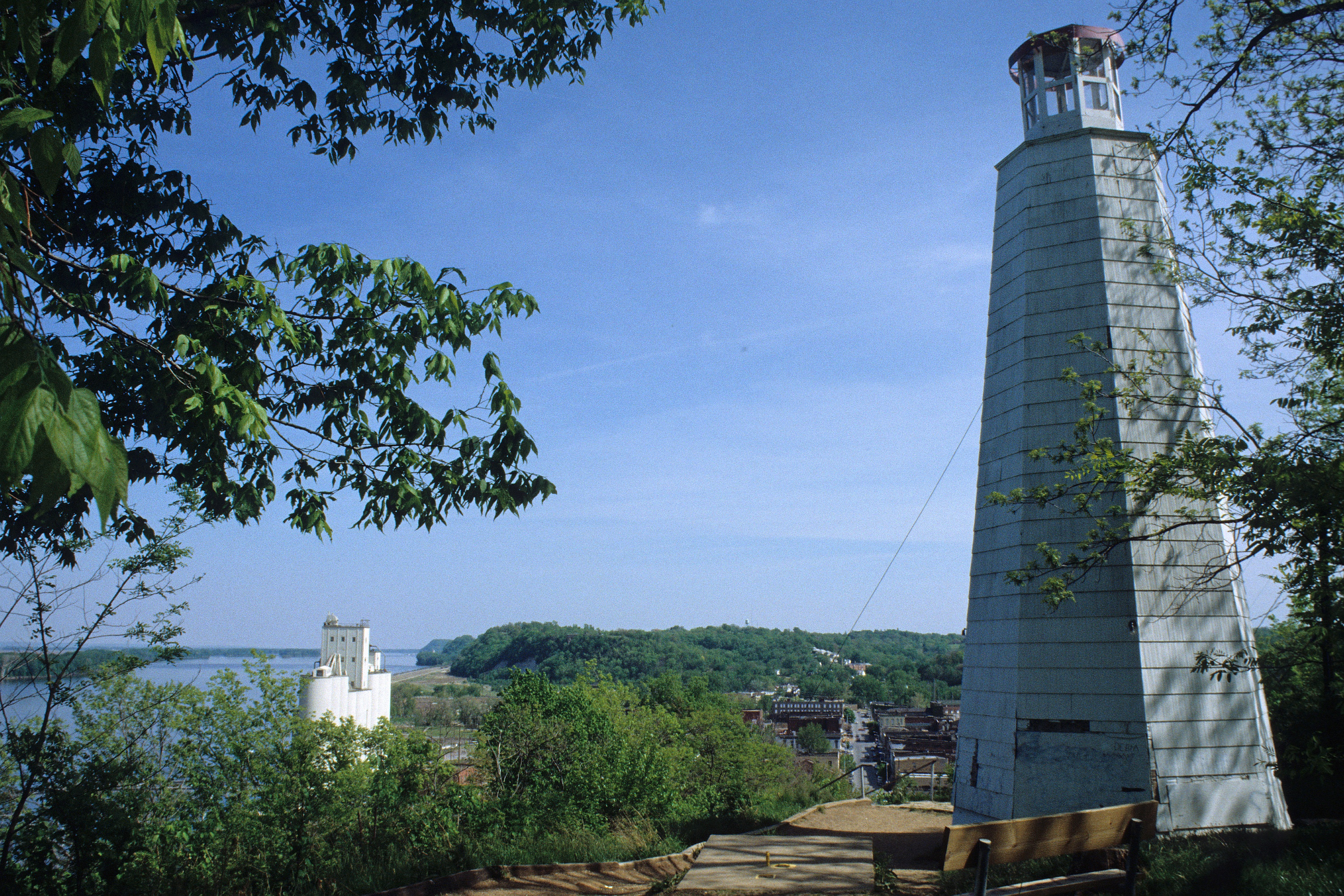
Mark Twain Memorial Lighthouse

- Cameron Cave (part of the Mark Twain Cave complex)
- Jim's Journey: The Huck Finn Freedom Center
- John Garth's Woodside Mansion
- Lover's Leap - Cliffside overlooking the Mississippi River and downtown Hannibal. The name comes from the local legend of two Native American lovers who were forbidden by their respective tribes to marry each other. Warriors were sent to kill the lovers, but the lovers, finding themselves cornered at the top of the cliff, embraced each other and threw themselves off the cliff to their deaths.
- Mark Twain Boyhood Home & Museum
- Mark Twain Cave - The cave that inspired Twain's tale of a lost Tom & Becky.
- Mark Twain Memorial Lighthouse - The only lighthouse built inland features a panoramic view of Hannibal and the Mississippi River. 244 steps to the top.
- Mark Twain Riverboat
- Molly Brown Birthplace & Museum - Home of RMS Titanic survivor.
- Riverview Park - 465 acres (1.88 km^{2}) of wooded land and scenic views of the Riverfront with over 3 miles of trails.
- Rockcliffe Mansion - Around the start of the 20th-century mansion.
- Sawyer's Creek Fun Park - Amusement complex on the riverfront. Reopened in Sept 2026 after being renovated by the owners of the Mark Twain cave Complex.
- Tom & Becky Appearances - Local 7th grade children are chosen to portray the famous literary couple in local appearances and in downtown Hannibal every Saturday and Sunday from March to October.
- National Tom Sawyer Days - Fence painting contest, frog jumping contest, mud volleyball, local arts and crafts and Fourth of July fireworks display from Lover's Leap.

== Government ==
Hannibal has a Municipal Home Rule form of government. Public services include police, fire, parks and recreation, public works, streets, inspections, tourism, library, and airport. There is a municipal court, and the Marion County Courthouse is located in Hannibal. A second county courthouse is located in the county seat in Palmyra.

== Education ==
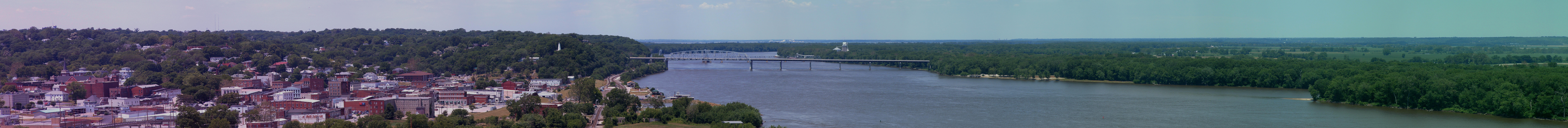
The view from Lover's Leap of Hannibal and the Mississippi River

The school district is Hannibal 60 School District.

Hannibal High School was founded in 1896. This public high school is part of the Hannibal School District #60, with K-12 grades serving Hannibal and surrounding areas. It is located at 4500 McMasters Ave. 63401.

Hannibal-LaGrange University is a four-year, Christian liberal arts university accredited by the Higher Learning Commission. Founded in 1858 in LaGrange, Missouri, the campus moved downriver to Hannibal in 1928, merging with then Hannibal College to form Hannibal-LaGrange College. Dr. Robert Matz was elected the 18th president of Hannibal-LaGrange University in 2022.

Moberly Area Community College (MACC-Hannibal Area Higher Education Center) is a two-year community college established in 1999. The MACC-Hannibal Campus is located on Shinn Lane near the hospital.

Hannibal's lending library, the Hannibal Free Public Library, was the first free public library in the state of Missouri.

== Media ==
The city is served by the Hannibal Courier-Post newspaper, printed daily on Tuesday through Saturday. KHQA is a television station licensed to Hannibal and located in Quincy, Illinois. Radio stations licensed to Hannibal include KGRC 92.9 FM, KHBL 96.9 FM, KHMO 1070 AM, and KJIR 91.7 FM.

== Infrastructure ==
=== Transportation ===
Interstate 72 was extended into Hannibal in 2000 from Illinois across the Mark Twain Memorial Bridge. Interstate 72 extends west to the interchange with U.S. Route 61. Future plans call for extending Interstate 72 west along U.S. Route 36 to Cameron, Missouri. This will give Hannibal an east–west link connecting Kansas City to Springfield. The Chicago–Kansas City Expressway links Hannibal from Kansas City to Chicago, Illinois. U.S. Route 61 goes from St. Louis in the south to St. Paul, Minnesota; it is known as the Avenue of the Saints corridor.

Hannibal Regional Airport (formerly Hannibal Municipal Airport) was renamed in 2003 as William P. Lear Field, in honor of Lear. He grew up in Hannibal and invented the Lear Jet. The airport is located 4 miles (6.4 km) west of the southern area and has one runway 4,400 feet (1,300 m) x 100 feet (30 m).

Freight railroad tracks link Hannibal in all directions: Burlington Northern Santa Fe (BNSF) tracks lead north to West Quincy, Missouri, and Burlington, Iowa, and south to St. Louis. Norfolk Southern (NS) tracks lead west to Kansas City and east to Springfield and Decatur, Illinois.

== Notable people ==
- Jake Beckley, major league baseball player
- James Carroll Beckwith, painter
- Margaret Brown, passenger on the RMS Titanic, known as the "unsinkable Molly Brown"
- Blanche Bruce, politician during Reconstruction
- Marie Ruoff Byrum, the first woman to vote in the United States
- W.H. Clune, early Hollywood film pioneer
- Robert Coontz, admiral
- Helen Cornelius, country music singer and songwriter
- Cliff Edwards, singer, actor, and the voice of Disney's Jiminy Cricket
- Cotton Fitzsimmons, basketball coach
- Lester Gaba, sculptor, writer, and retail display designer
- Clarence Earl Gideon, accused person responsible for landmark 1963 U.S. Supreme Court ruling of Gideon v. Wainwright
- Julia Greeley, born in slavery; today being considered for Saint in Roman Catholic Church
- Robert V. Hogg, statistician, educator, and co-author of the classic math-stat textbook
- Harry Richard Landis, one of the last surviving World War I veterans, born near Hannibal
- William P. Lear, inventor of the car radio and manufacturer of the Lear Jet
- Lydia Locke, opera singer
- William F. Miller, Major League Baseball pitcher for the St Louis Browns
- Warren H. Orr, Chief Justice of the Illinois Supreme Court
- Eddie Phillips, major league baseball pinch runner
- George Poage, the first African American to win an Olympic medal
- Ron Powers, author
- Benjamin Prentiss, Civil War officer
- Albert L. Rendlen, Chief Justice of the Supreme Court of Missouri
- William Hepburn Russell, attorney and political figure who owned the Boston Rustlers of the National League in 1911
- Mary Rhodes Russell, Chief Justice of the Supreme Court of Missouri
- Scott Sanders, baseball player
- Melissa Scholes Young, author of Flood
- Larry Thompson, Deputy Attorney General of the United States under President George W. Bush
- Mark Twain (Samuel L. Clemens), author

== Gallery ==
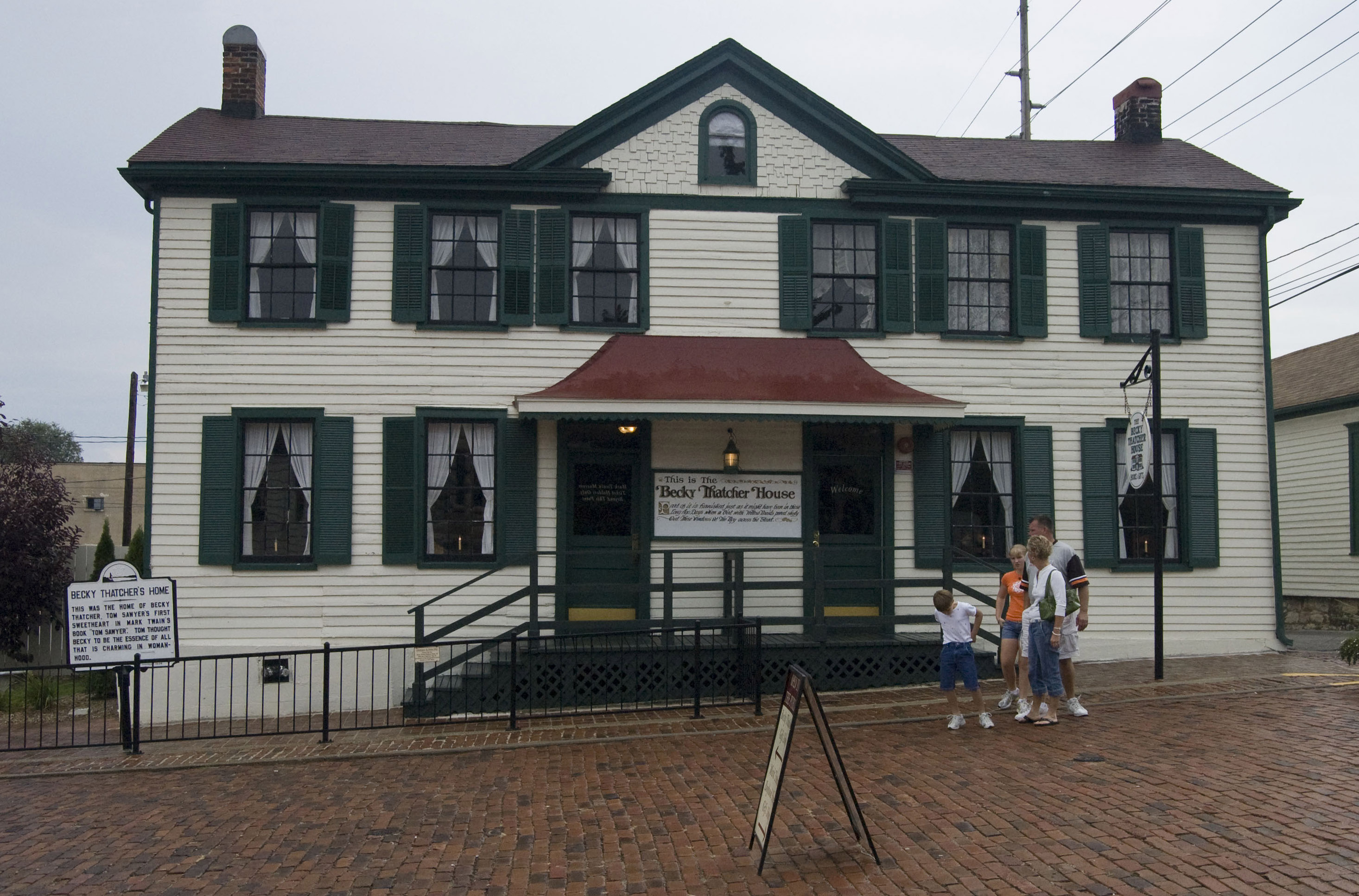
The home of the girl who inspired Becky Thatcher

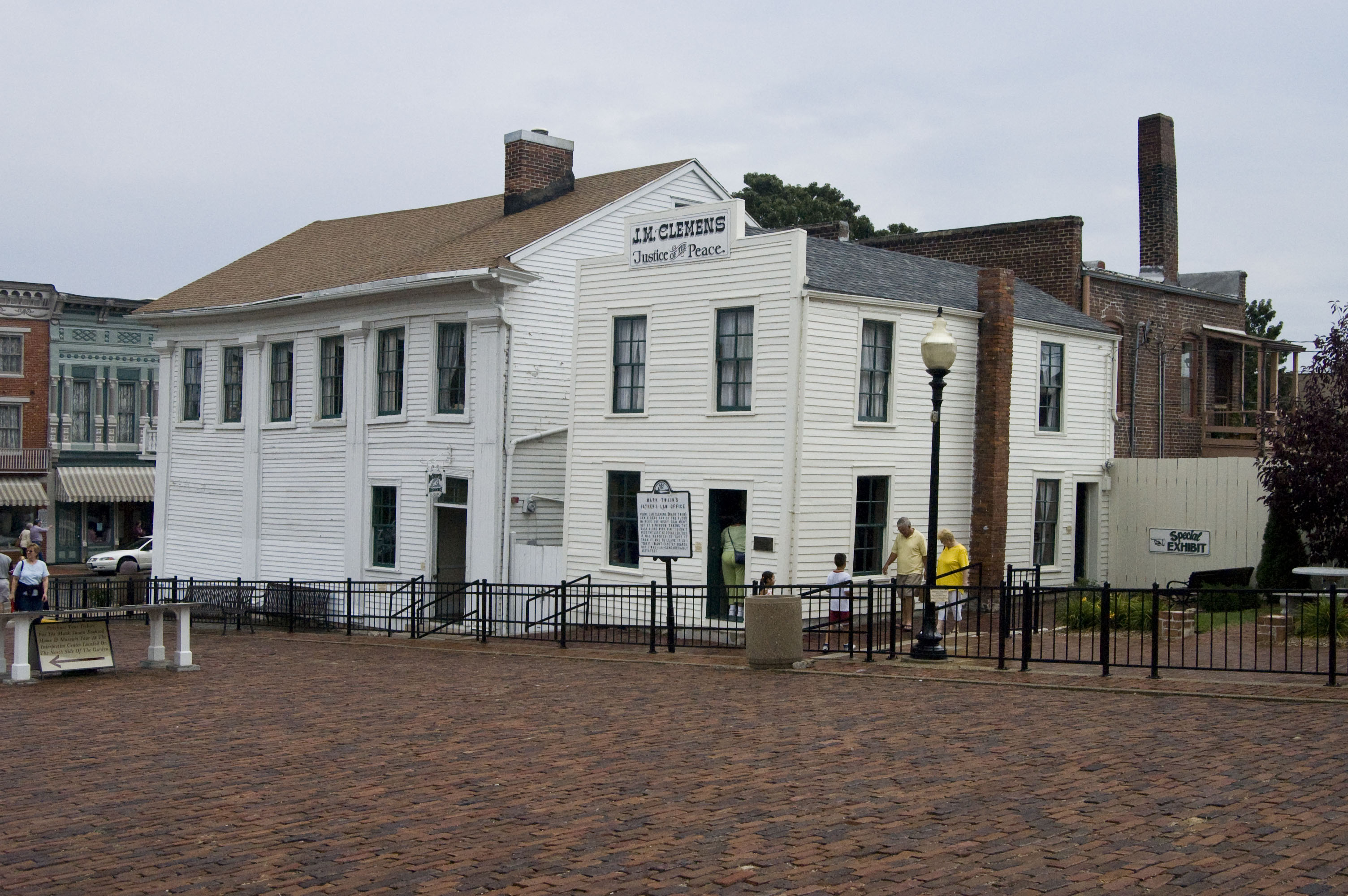
The office of John Clemens, Mark Twain's father, who was the Justice of the Peace

== See also ==
- List of cities in Missouri
