= LouFest =

Annual music festival in St. Louis, Missouri

LouFest Music Festival
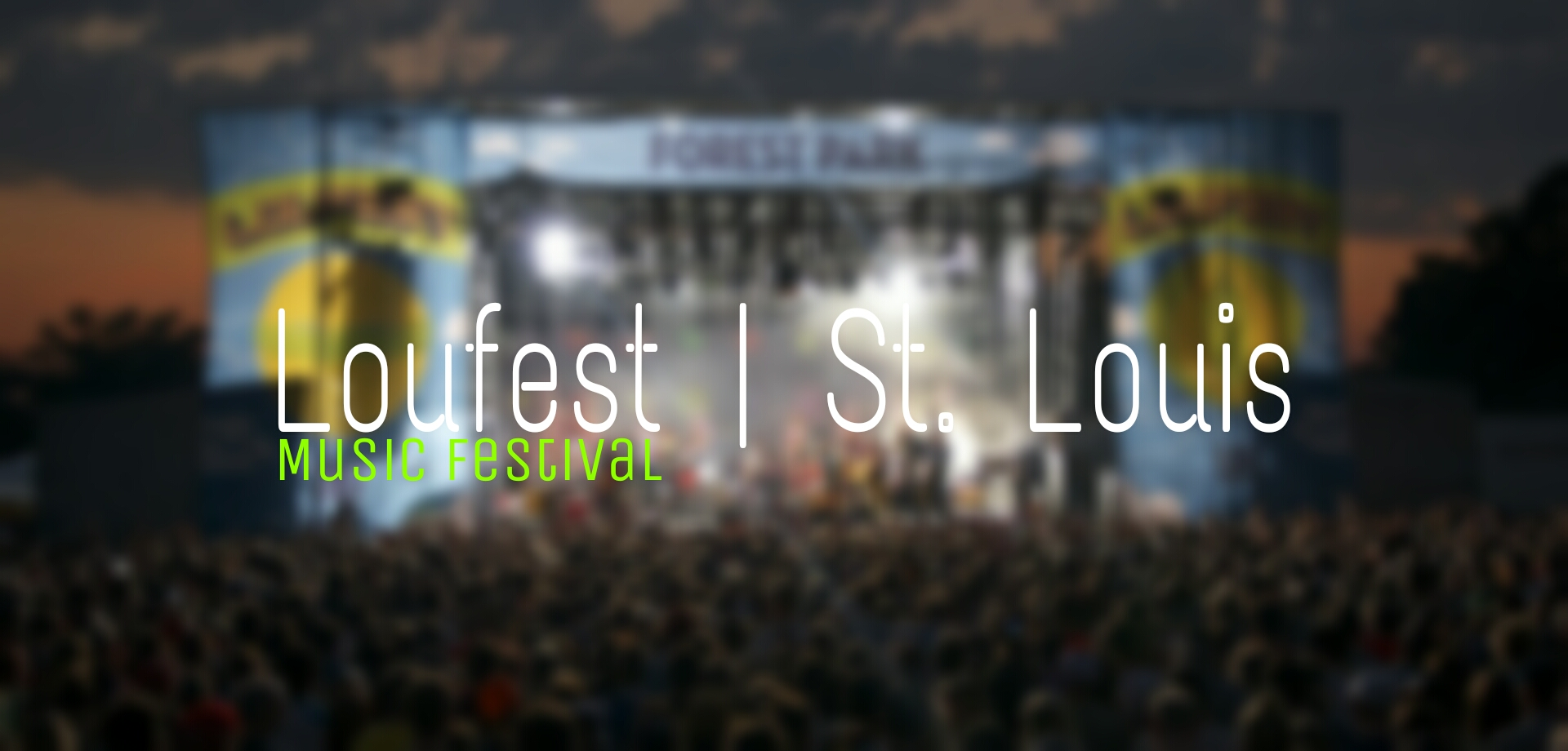
- Locations: Forest Park, St. Louis, Missouri, United States
- Years active: 2010–2018
- Founders: Listen Live Entertainment, Brian Cohen
- Website: loufest.com (archived)

The LouFest Music Festival was an annual two-day event held 2010 - 2018 in Forest Park, located in St. Louis, Missouri, United States. The event featured local, regional and national acts, with an aesthetic range from funk and indie-rock to alt-country and soul. The event featured four stages with alternating performances throughout the weekend. The festival grounds included a children's stage and village, an environmentally friendly vendor area, and a food court featuring restaurants from St. Louis neighborhoods. On September 5, 2018, LouFest was canceled only days before the event was supposed to take place due to “the loss of two of the event’s top sponsors, scheduling and contract issues with major artists, and existing debt from previous events."

== Post-Loufest 2018 ==
After Loufest's 2018 cancellation, several of the participants and vendors made their own events. LouFest headliner Robert Plant and the Sensational Space Shifters rebooked to do a Sunday night show at The Pageant. St. Louis Post Dispatch Journalist Kevin C. Johnson wrote, "Tank and the Bangas and Scrub and Ace Ha are two of the 41 acts who were scheduled to perform at LouFest in Forest Park this weekend, and both landed on their feet after LouFest was canceled with the Old Rock House show." Some St. Louis vendors created events, including Archfest and LouWow, to help vendors recoup sales they would have lost without Loufest.

The Kranzberg Arts Foundation, Urban Chestnut Brewing Co., Gaslight Records, Venture Cafe, Regional Arts Commission, Fabricatorz Foundation, and Express Scripts sponsored a showcase called The Sound of St. Louis featuring over 15 local musical acts at The Grendel in Grand Center Arts District, St. Louis. The acts performing at the Sounds of St. Louis include Ben Reece's Unity Quartet, Bob DeBoo, The Burney Sisters, DJ AgileOne, Dracla, Grace Basement, Jesse Gannon, Kasimu-tet, Kevin Bowers' Nova, The Knuckles, Mo Egeston, Owen Ragland, Ptah Williams, The River Kittens, Scrub & Ace Ha, and Tonina

Chris Hansen, executive director of the Kranzberg Arts Foundation, said "our organizational mission is to serve and support and the void that was left needed to have civic-minded organizations and companies to step up to protect our local talent. It was a obvious and natural decision for us to do this."

In addition, the annual alternative to Loufest event, Pü FeST, started in 2014 as an alternative to LouFest, and now continues as a "DIY, weirdo alternative" underground festival featuring some rising stars such as Blvck Spvde, Nineteen, Effluvium, 18andCounting, and ICE aka Black James.

The cancellation of Loufest has been hailed as "Everything That's Right About St. Louis." And, some are praising Loufest for the cancellation as an "accidental reminder that [St. Louis is] amazing."

== History ==
The Loufest Music Festival was formally founded in November 2009 with the first event taking place August 28 and 29, 2010. The event was the creation of Brian Cohen, a documentary filmmaker originally from Abilene, Texas. 2010 headliners included Broken Social Scene, She & Him, Built to Spill, The Airborne Toxic Event, Titus Andronicus, Fruit Bats, and Jeff Tweedy. Cohen sold his stake in the festival in 2016.

== 2018 LouFest Music Festival ==
The 2018 LouFest music festival was to be held on September 8 and 9, but was cancelled because of financial difficulties in paying vendors and "untimely press attention." Vendors complained that in years prior they had difficulties being paid and demanded a deposit for services to be rendered. Several vendors assumed they will not receive their deposits returned.

Robert Plant and Modest Mouse were to be the event headliners. Musician Owen W. Ragland was scheduled to perform, and said he and his band put in a lot of time preparing to perform and was disappointed:

"A lot of us had been hearing things" leading up to the festival, he said, but "I didn’t think they would actually cancel it. The work I put in and that my team put in ... It's disappointing for the city to have this loss. But I'm interested to see who steps up and fills the void. There's clearly a want for LouFest. It's definitely a bummer to see it go to waste."

Singer-bassist Tonina said, "I feel like, what artist is going to want to come here after this, if there's another one in the future? Musicians listen to that, and they talk to each other. We're already skipped by so many bands in general and needed this festival more than any other city," she said.

Up and coming Rapper Smino, a headliner from 2017, tweeted, "LouFest been bogus. We gone bring sumn better 4 da city."

Tickets are to be refunded but the organizers do not currently have the funds to pay back ticketholders. However, Live Nation and Ticketmaster will refund tickets as the organizers repay those two companies.

== 2017 LouFest Music Festival ==
The 2017 LouFest music festival was held on September 9 and 10, a Saturday and Sunday. The festival was moved from the grand fields to the area around the upper lot of The Muny.

Artists performing:

Saturday: Snoop Dogg, Cage the Elephant, Spoon, Huey Lewis & the News, Marian Hill, ZZ Ward, Rainbow Kitten Surprise, Hippo Campus, Middle Kids, Ron Gallo, Mvstermind, Jonny P, Chris Bandi, Mathias & the Pirates and Starwolf

Sunday: Weezer, Run the Jewels, Nathaniel Rateliff & the Night Sweats, Lizzo, Lecrae, Robert Randolph & the Family Band, Houndmouth, The Record Company, Mondo Cozmo, Noname, Future Thieves, Okey Dokey, Jack Grelle, Jess Nolan, 18andcounting, Beth Bombara

Note: Harts was originally scheduled to play Sunday but dropped off and was replaced by Okey Dokey.

== 2016 LouFest Music Festival ==
The 2016 LouFest music festival was held on September 10 and 11, a Saturday and Sunday.

Artists performing:

Saturday: Chris Stapleton, Band of Horses, Big Gigantic, St. Lucia, Preservation Hall Jazz Band, Charles Bradley and his Extraordinaries, Frightened Rabbit, The Heavy, Foxing, Caveman, Chicano Batman, Diarrhea Planet, The Quaker City Night Hawks, Twin Limb, JMR, Illphonics, Bruiser Queen, The Sleepy Rubies

Sunday: LCD Soundsystem, Lauryn Hill, The Kills, Buddy Guy, Shakey Graves, Vince Staples, Greensky Bluegrass, Anderson .Paak & The Free Nationals, Wild Belle, Twin Peaks, Judah and the Lion, Rayland Baxter, Mothers, NAWAS, Bonnie Bishop, Aaron Kamm & The One Drops, Karate Bikini, John Hardy.

== 2015 LouFest Music Festival ==
The 2015 LouFest music festival was held on September 12 and 13, a Saturday and Sunday.

The lineup was officially released on May 15.

Saturday: Hozier, Ludacris, Brandon Flowers, Nate Ruess, Blue October, Albert Hammond Jr., Nico & Vinz, Robert DeLong, Milo Greene, Knox Hamilton, Jessica Hernandez & the Deltas, Colony House, Brave Baby, The Black Cadillacs, Coin, Clockwork, KOA

Sunday: The Avett Brothers, Young the Giant, Billy Idol, Umphrey's McGee, Lord Huron, JJ Grey & Mofro, Pokey Lafarge, Misterwives, Delta Rae, Strand of Oaks, The Suffers, Walking Shapes, All Them Witches, The Bros. Landreth, Hembree, American Wrestlers, Earl Burrows

== 2014 LouFest Music Festival ==
The 2014 LouFest Music Festival was held on September 6–7 with a lineup that included the following:

Saturday: Arctic Monkeys, Cake, The 1975, Future Islands, Yo La Tengo, Washed Out, RAC, Blackberry Smoke, Delta Spirit, San Fermin, Those Darlins, Falls, Skaters, Roadkill Ghost Choir, Black Pistol Fire, Alanna Royale, Kins, The Jane Shermans, Colin Lake, Big Brother Thunder and the Master Blasters

Sunday: OutKast, Grouplove, Matt and Kim, Portugal. The Man, Trombone Shorty and Orleans Avenue, Cherub, Vintage Trouble, Lettuce, Moon Taxi, Empires, Young & Sick, The Districts, Kopecky Family Band, Glass Animals, AJR, UME, Old Salt Union, Marc Scibilia, Dylan McDonald & the Avians, Pretty Little Empire

Note: Kelis and Holychild were originally scheduled to perform but were later replaced by Yo La Tengo and UME

== 2013 LouFest Music Festival ==
The 2013 LouFest Music Festival was held on September 7–8.

Saturday, September 7: Wilco, Jim James, The National, Toro y Moi, Fitz and the Tantrums, Ra Ra Riot, Trampled by Turtles, Robert DeLong, J Roddy Walston and the Business, Jukebox the Ghost, Wild Belle, Desert Noises, Space Capone, Modoc, Kentucky Knife Fight

Sunday, September 8: The Killers, Edward Sharpe and the Magnetic Zeros, Alabama Shakes, Icona Pop, Local Natives, Walk the Moon, Court Yard Hounds, Twin Shadow, Youngblood Hawke, The Mowgli's, Brick + Mortar, Wild Cub, Tef Poe, Andrea Davidson, The Lonely Biscuits

== 2012 LouFest Music Festival ==
The 2012 LouFest Music Festival was held on August 25–26.

Saturday, August 25: Girl Talk, Dinosaur Jr., Phantogram, Son Volt, Little Barrie, Cotton Mather, King Tuff, Sleepy Kitty

Sunday, August 26: The Flaming Lips, Dr. Dog, Dawes, Wild Nothing, Cults, Someone Still Loves You Boris Yeltsin, Thee Satisfaction, Pernikoff Brothers

Note: We Are Scientists were originally scheduled to play Sunday but were forced to drop off for health reasons and were replaced by Wild Nothing.

== 2011 LouFest Music Festival ==
The 2011 LouFest Music Festival was held on August 27–28.

The 2nd year line-up included:

Saturday, August 27: The Hold Steady, Deerhunter, Questlove (DJ set), Surfer Blood, Dom, Kings Go Forth, Sleepy Sun, Troubadour Dali, Jon Hardy & the Public

Note: The Roots were originally scheduled to headline Saturday night but were forced to cancel due to Hurricane Irene.

Sunday, August 28: TV on the Radio, Cat Power, !!!, Das Racist, The Low Anthem, Lost in the Trees, UME, Jumbling Towers, Old Lights

== 2010 LouFest Music Festival ==
The 2010 LouFest Music Festival was held on August 28–29.

Saturday, August 28: Broken Social Scene, Built to Spill, Airborne Toxic Event, Lucero, Titus Andronicus, Adam Reichman, So Many Dynamos, stephaniesǐd, The Bottle Rockets

Note: Northwoods were originally scheduled to play Saturday but dropped off due to a scheduling conflict and were replaced by The Bottle Rockets.

Sunday, August 29: She & Him, Jeff Tweedy, Alejandro Escovedo, Fruit Bats, Cory Chisel and The Wandering Sons, Gentleman Auction House, Carolina Chocolate Drops, Magnolia Summer, Kim Massie

== Greening ==
The festival offers free water refills and discourages the use of plastic bottles. Food and beverage vendors at LouFest are required to only use recyclable or compostable products.
