= Preclarus Mastery Academy =

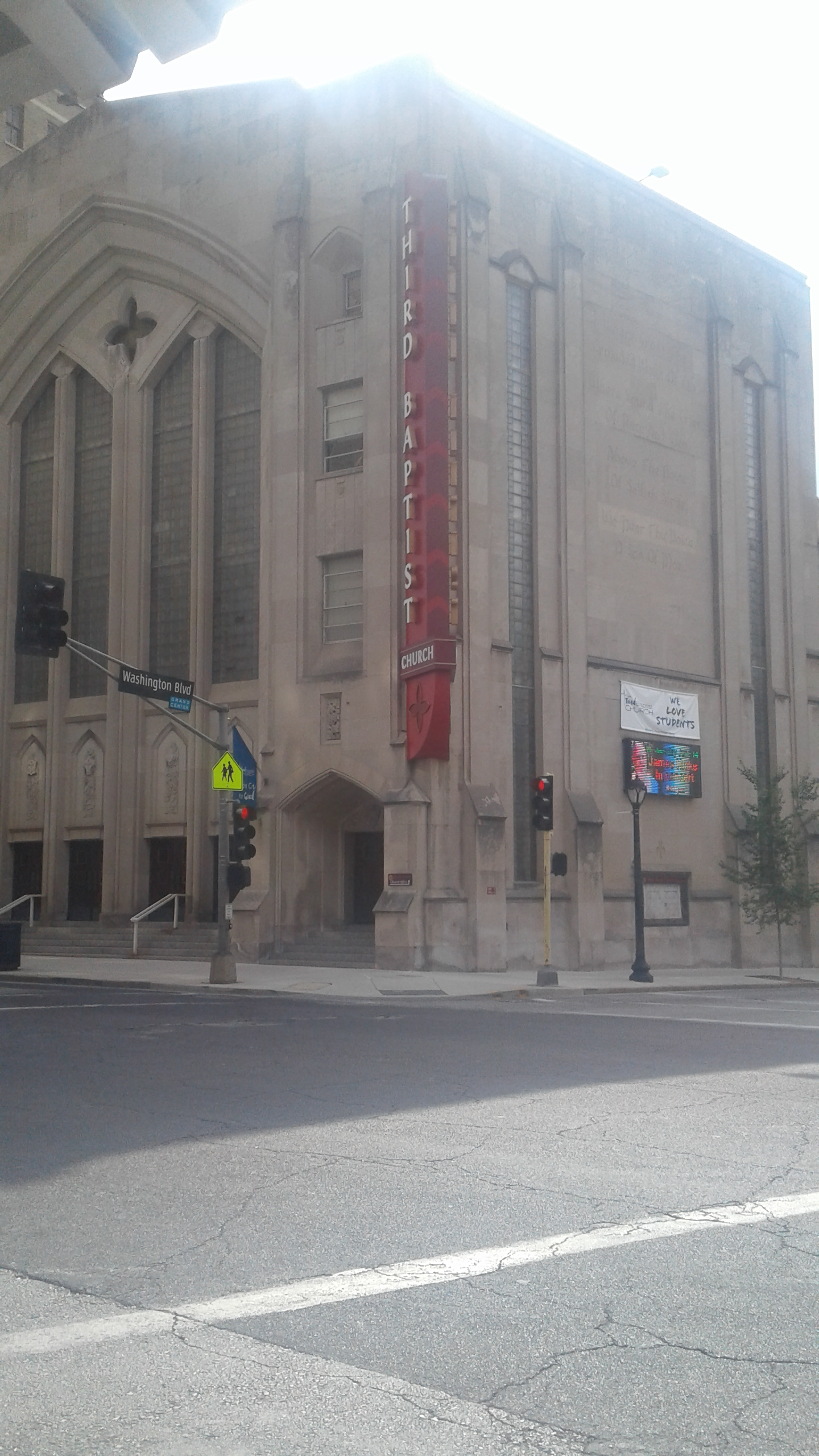
- The front of Third Baptist Church, home of St.Louis public charter school Preclarus Mastery Academy

Location
- 620 North Grand Avenue; St. Louis, Missouri 63103; United States
- Coordinates: 38.639211°N 90.230845°W

Information
- Established: 2011
- Founder: Daryl McAdoo
- School district: Preclarus Mastery Academy
- Superintendent: Dr.Tonya Harris
- Principal: Dr. Karessa Morrow
- Grades: 4-8
- Enrollment: 240
- Colors: Maroon and Gold
- Mascot: Eagle
- Website: School website

Preclarus Mastery Academy is a secular, co-educational, public charter middle school home to more than 200 students ranging from grades 4 through 8. Preclarus Mastery Academy operates inside the Third Baptist Church which is located in the St. Louis neighborhood of Grand Center.

== History ==
The concept of Preclarus originated in 2009 as a result of the first CEO and President Daryl McAdoo's vision and the support of Business Manager Eileen Ke. The original board consisted of: Brandy Cook (treasurer), Jeanne Foster (secretary), Erica McAdoo (special projects), Anthony Sanders (board chairman), Andrew Warshauer (board member), April Lomax (board member), Cheryl Rodgers (board member), Danny Warren (board member), Jason Tarre (board member), Zach Streit (board member) and Kimberly Stemley (board member).

The University of Missouri - St. Louis (UMSL) approved the initial charter in 2010 and the school opened at 620 North Grand Boulevard in August 2011. On August 13, 2013, Preclarus Mastery Academy bid farewell to founder and former Executive Director Mr. Daryl McAdoo. The first official Preclarus Mastery Academy basketball game was on December 10, 2013, against Confluence Academy-South City. In 2015, UMSL renewed the school's charter extending the agreement for five years.

In January 2017, Bill Mendelsohn, UMSL's director of charter schools, announced they were revoking its charter sponsorship. "This school struggled to provide an effective academic program from its inception, primarily due to ineffective leadership in its early years." Preclarus leaders argued that they did not have enough time for change. In March 2017, Preclarus was granted a reprieve to stay open when UMSL overruled its charter school office and agreed to continue sponsoring Preclarus Mastery Academy.

== Partnerships with Businesses ==
Preclarus Mastery Academy was one of the first three schools to participate in the Inaugural 2016 STEM GAMES at Gary Gore Community Learning Center which featured partnerships with The Boeing Company, Lee Horneyer Company, and Maryville University.
