= Public Media Commons =

Coordinates: 38°38′21″N 90°14′02″W

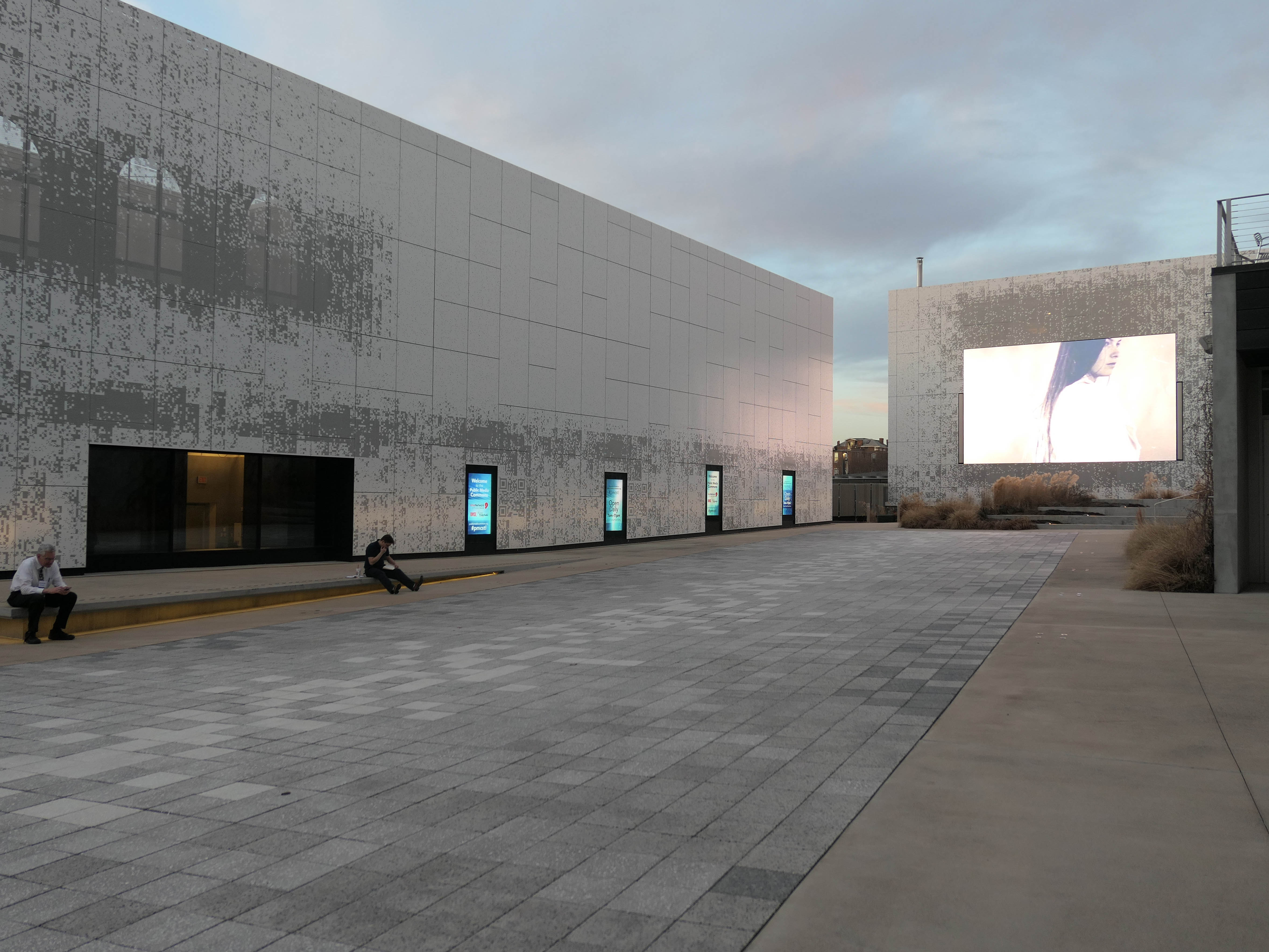
Public Media Commons

The Public Media Commons is a 9,000 square foot plaza located in St. Louis, Missouri. The Commons is a collaboration between Nine Network of Public Media, the University of Missouri–St. Louis, and St. Louis Public Radio. The plaza is encapsulated on two sides by large video screen walls, two stories high. The Public Media Commons is an interactive space that utilizes technology to encourage the sharing and creating of audio/visual experiences in St.Louis.

The Commons creates a new typology of public space for media programming. Perforated metal screens were designed for existing buildings to unify the space and screens to create areas for projectors. The commons accommodates performance stages for small groups and multiple seating areas for up to 700 people. The project was designed by Benjamin Gilmartin Architect and Cobalt Office with Architect of Record Powers Bowersox Associates and Landscape Architect DLANDstudio.
