= Janet Buchanan =

Janet Buchanan may refer to:

- Janet Irvine Buchanan (born 1988), popularly known as Janet Evra, English-born vocalist, bassist, guitarist, songwriter and bandleader
- Janet May Buchanan (1866–1912), Scottish Egyptologist
