= Los Angeles County Arts Commission =

Arts council in Greater Los Angeles

The Los Angeles County Arts Commission provides leadership in cultural services of all disciplines for the largest county in the United States, encompassing 88 municipalities. The Arts Commission provides leadership and staffing to support the County-wide collaboration for arts education called the Arts Ed Collective, administers a grants program that funds more than 400 nonprofit arts organizations annually, oversees the county's Civic Art Program for capital projects, funds the largest arts internship program in the country in conjunction with the Getty Foundation and supports the Los Angeles County Cultural Calendar on Discover LA and Spacefinder LA, a site connecting artists and arts organizations. The commission also produces free community programs, including a year-round music program that funds free concerts in public sites.

== History ==
The Los Angeles County Arts Commission was established in 1947. In the first two decades of its inception the LA County Arts Commission primarily funded professional and community music groups such as orchestras and was known as the Music Commission. In 1966, the Commission changed its name to the Los Angeles County Music and Performing Arts Commission and also brought under its funding umbrella dance and theater organizations.

In 1985, the Los Angeles County Music and Performing Arts Commission received additional funding for the first time from the state arts agency, the California Arts Council (CAC). This enabled it to support a larger number of community-based arts organizations from varying disciplines.

In 1997 the Los Angeles County Music and Performing Arts Commission changed its name to the Los Angeles County Arts Commission to signify the organization's equal support to all art disciplines.

In April 2017, the Los Angeles County Arts Commission (LACAC) announced a monumental new Cultural Equity and Inclusion Initiative (CEII), which includes 13 recommendations to the L.A. County Board of Supervisors intended to “ensure that everyone in L.A. County has equitable access to arts and culture” and to “improve inclusion in the wider arts ecology for all residents in every community.”

== See also ==
- Regional Arts Commission
