= Old Salt Union =

American newgrass band

- Origin: Belleville, Illinois
- Genres: Americana
- Years active: 2012–present
- Members: Ryan Murphey (Banjo); Jesse Farrar (Bass); Justin Wallace (Mandolin); John Brighton (Fiddle)
- Past members: Dustin Eiskant (Guitar); Rob Kindle (Guitar); Graham Curry (Guitar)
- Website: oldsaltunion.com/home

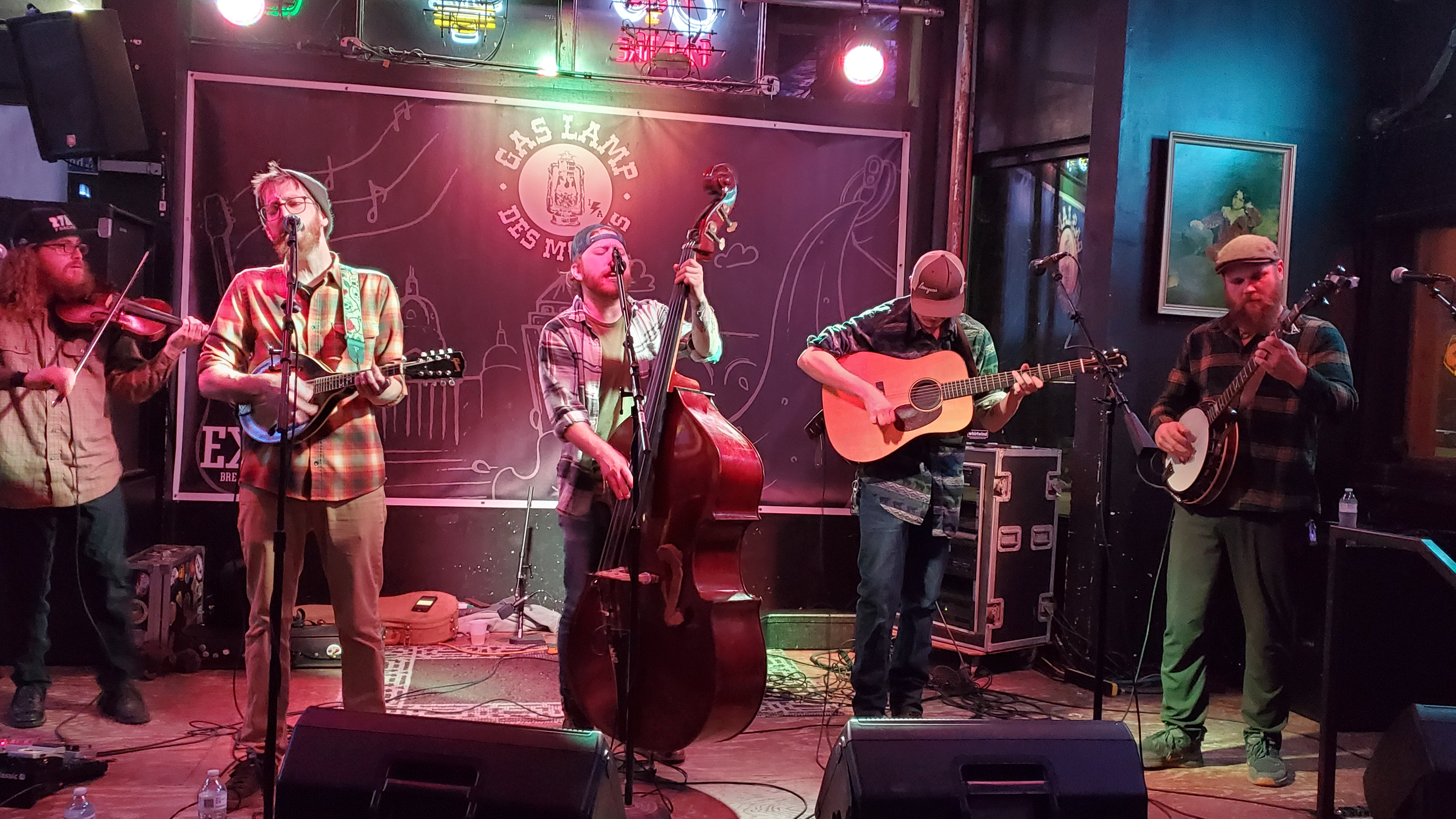
OSU Live at the Gaslamp, Des Moines, IA on November 15, 2019. L to R: John Brighton, Justin Wallace, Jesse Farrar, Graham Curry, Ryan Murphey.

Old Salt Union (OSU) is a newgrass/americana string band from Belleville, Illinois. They have cited musical influences from jazz, classical, jam band and alternative. The band formed in 2012 and have since performed at many national festivals including LouFest, Stagecoach Festival, Bluegrass Underground, Winter Wondergrass, Freshgrass, featured on Music City Roots, Wakarusa, Yonder Mountain String Band's Harvest Festival, played the 2014 Daytona 500, FloydFest, Camp Euforia and the Walnut Valley Festival. The band was voted Best Bluegrass Band in St. Louis by The Riverfront Times in 2013 and Best Country Artist in 2014. Old Salt Union's line-up consists of Ryan Murphey (Banjo), Jesse Farrar (Upright Bass), Justin Wallace (Mandolin) and John Brighton (Fiddle).

Old Salt Union has released two independent full-length albums a four track live vinyl "Woodshed" and in early 2016 released an EP entitled "Cut & Run." They recently recorded a single in Nashville, TN with Alison Brown. They have either shared the stage or opened up for national acts Sam Bush, Del McCoury, The Travelin' McCourys, Leftover Salmon, The Reverend Horton Heat, Greensky Bluegrass, Lonesome River Band, Jeff Austin, Son Volt and Yonder Mountain String Band.

Founding member Dustin Eiskant left the band mid 2016 and Old Salt Union announced Rob Kindle would be his replacement. Rob left the group in July 2018 and the band selected Graham Curry to be their guitar player immediately thereafter. Graham left the band at the end of December 2019.

== Self-Titled Debut ==
Old Salt Union signed with Compass Records of Nashville in early 2017 and released their eponymous record on August 4, 2017. The album features ten re-arranged, re-mixed and re-mastered previously recorded tracks from the band's catalog - including a rendition of Paul Simon's "You Can Call Me Al". The album is produced by Alison Brown and was recorded at Compass Records Studios in Nashville, TN.

== Where The Dogs Don’t Bite ==
Old Salt Union released their second Compass Records album, "Where The Dogs Don't Bite", on August 16, 2019 to critical acclaim. The album contains 10 tracks of original material, one of which, "Tell Me So", is a duet with famous bluegrass performer and tenor Bobby Osborne. The release reached number one on the Billboard Charts bluegrass albums for the week of August 31, 2019.

== Discography ==
- Western Skies (2013)
- Bridge (2014)
- Woodshed (2014)
- Cut & Run (2016)
- Old Salt Union (2017)
- Where The Dogs Don't Bite (2019)
