= WQUB =

Coordinates: 39.956°N 91.390°W

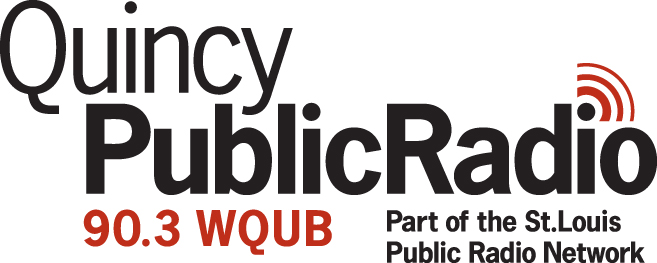
- Quincy, Illinois; United States
- Broadcast area: Quincy, Illinois
- Frequency: 90.3 MHz (HD Radio)
- Branding: Quincy Public Radio

Programming
- Format: Public radio (KWMU simulcast)
- Subchannels: HD2: Jazz (KWMU-HD2 simulcast); HD3: Classical "Classical 90.3" (KWMU-HD3 simulcast)

Ownership
- Owner: University of Missouri St. Louis; (The Curators of the University of Missouri)
- Sister stations: KWMU (HD Radio)

History
- First air date: 1979 (originally carrier current 1948–1979)
- Former call signs: WWQC (1979–1988)

Technical information
- Licensing authority: FCC
- Facility ID: 54282
- Class: B
- ERP: 28,000 watts
- HAAT: 127 meters (417 ft)

Links
- Public license information: Public file; LMS
- Webcast: Listen live
- Website: stlpublicradio.org/quincy

WQUB (90.3 FM) is a 28,000 watt effective radiated power radio station in Quincy, Illinois, in western Illinois along the Mississippi River. This station provides primary coverage for nine counties in the western Illinois and northeastern Missouri region. It is owned by the University of Missouri St. Louis and serves as a semi-satellite of KWMU in St. Louis.

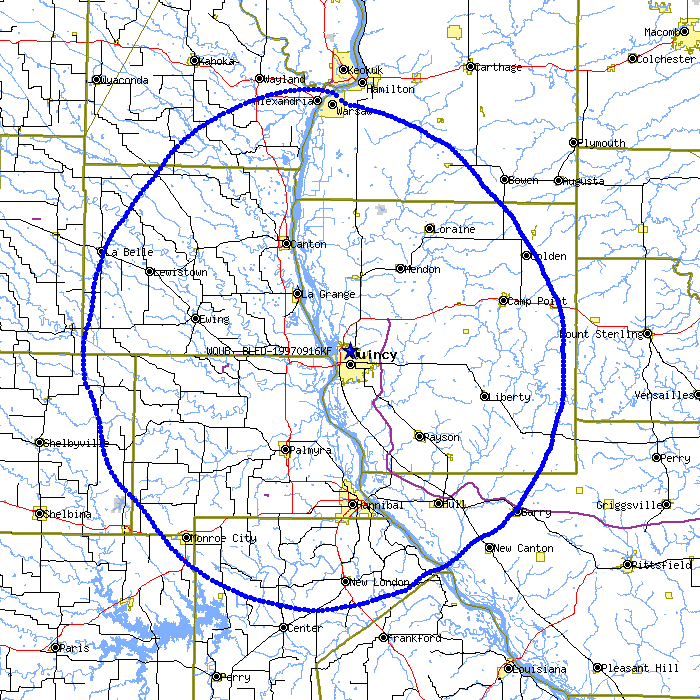
WQUB coverage map

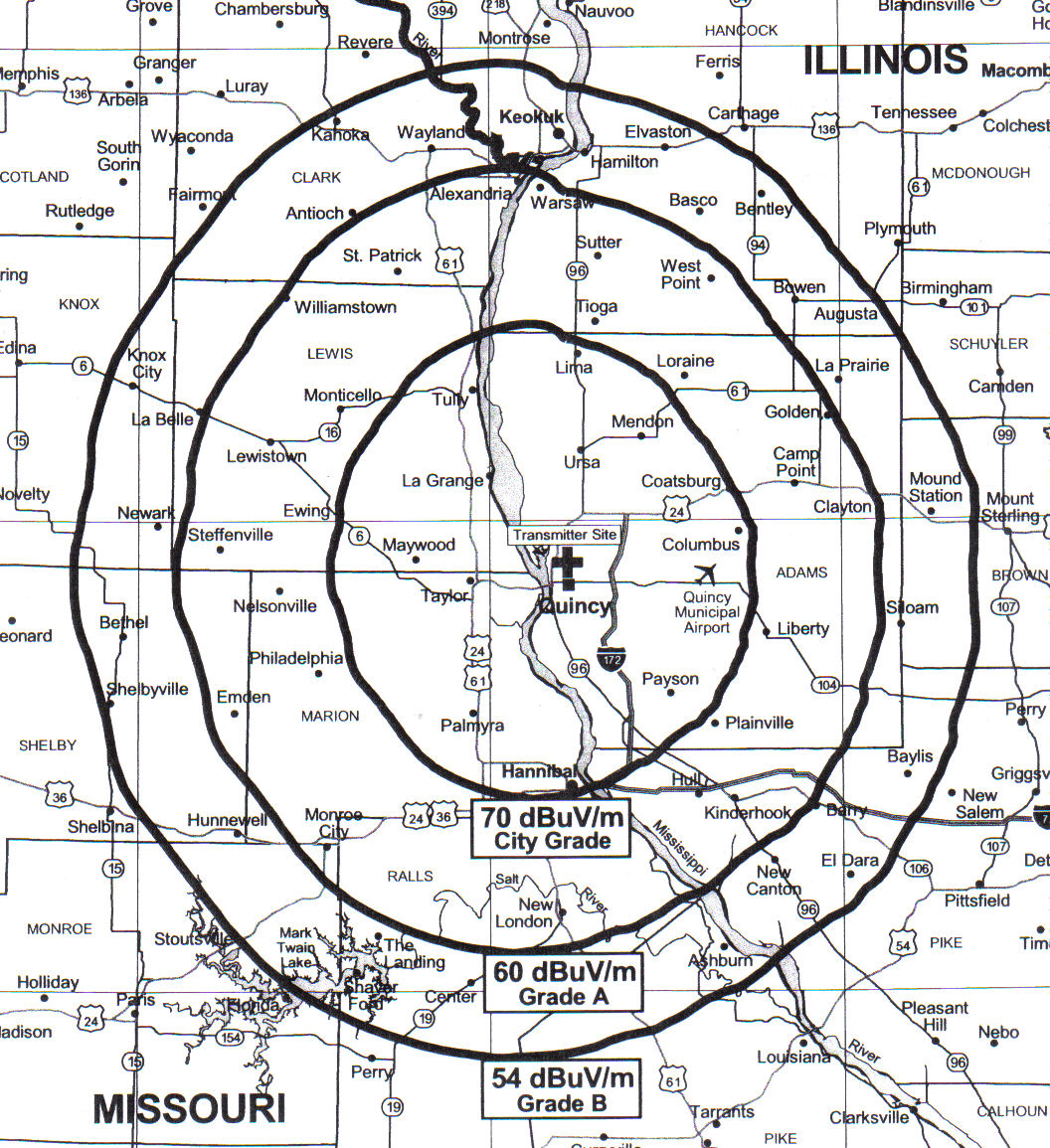
This coverage map is WQUB-FMs propagation curves indicating distances to a particular field strength. Below results are indicative of the FCC's contours for City Grade, Grade A, and Grade B for WQUB-FM. WQUB-FM service contours for 70 dBuV/m indicates a strong signal while the 54 dBuV/m contour is the edge of our coverage. Be aware that WQUB-FM can often be heard in locations beyond the edge service contour, but that service is not protected from interference caused by other stations.

== History ==
WQUB began in 1948 as WWQC, a carrier current on the campus of Quincy University, then known as Quincy College. In 1974, the college was granted a full license for a 10-watt station which went on the air in 1979. Its coverage area was effectively limited to the area around Francis Hall on campus. In 1983, power was boosted to 100 watts, enough to cover the campus. The response was strong enough that the school began an effort to upgrade the station, culminating in becoming a full NPR member in 1988, not long after the school won university status. Power was also increased to 10,000 watts. The station increased its power to the current 28,000 watts in 2000.

However, the station had never attracted much community support. At one point, listener support only accounted for 10 percent of its operating costs—a very low number even for such a small market. In 2010, Quincy University decided to get out of broadcasting and redirect more of its resources into athletics, including a junior varsity football squad. Quincy University transferred operational control of the station to area NBC affiliate WGEM-TV and laid off three staff members. Quincy University was finding it difficult to sustain the station in the economic climate. Additionally, NPR officials were not pleased or comfortable with a commercial station operating the community local NPR affiliate. Under the circumstances, Quincy University sold WQUB to UMSL in May 2012. The sale officially closed on July 26, 2012.

Before the sale, WQUB aired a mix of NPR news and talk, classical music, alternative music and jazz. Since the sale, WQUB has aired the same programming as KWMU, with local inserts.

On February 10, 2025, St. Louis Public Radio announced UMSL will be transferring the licenses for KWMU, KMST, and WQUB to Friends of KWMU, Inc.
