= Grand Center Arts Academy =

Arts school in St. Louis, Missouri, USA

Coordinates: 38°38′26″N 90°13′50″W

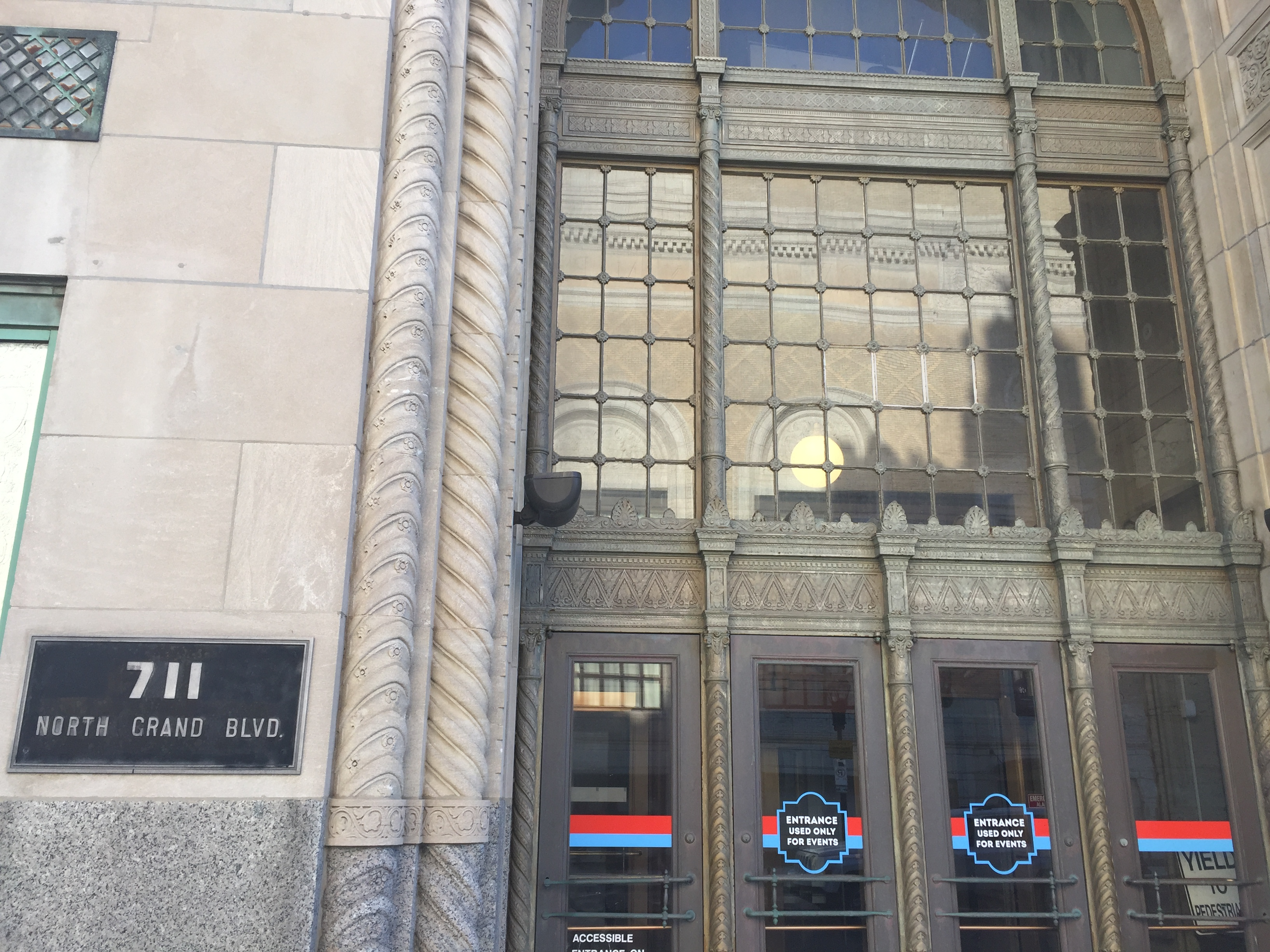

Information
- Established: 2010; 16 years ago
- Website: www.grandcenterartsacademy.org

The Grand Center Arts Academy is an arts school in St. Louis, Missouri that focuses on dance, orchestra, band, visual arts, choir, and theater. Opened in 2010, the school is located in the Grand Center arts district, in the redeveloped Carter Carburetor complex at 711 North Grand. It began with the 6th and 7th grades, and graduated its first senior class in May 2016.

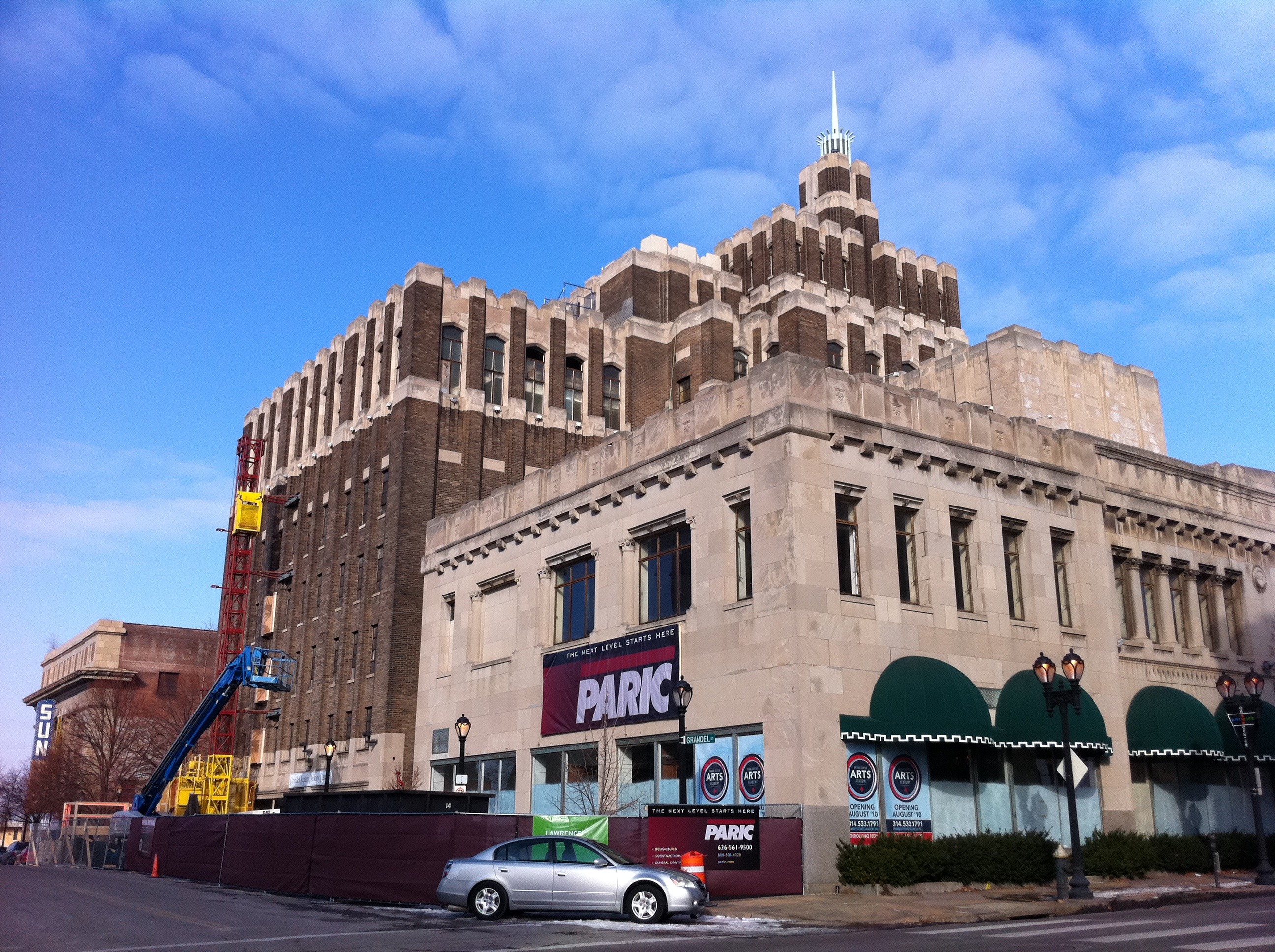
Construction on the Grand Center Arts Academy, December 2010
