= Arch Grants =

- Named after: Gateway Arch
- Founded at: St. Louis, Missouri, United States
- Type: Non-profit foundation
- Headquarters: St. Louis, Missouri, United States
- Region served: Midwest
- Executive Director: Gabe Angieri
- Board of directors: Zundra Bryant (President), Matt Badler (Treasurer), Stefanie Thelen (Secretary), Jerry Schlichter (Co-Founder), Ali Ahmadi, Jack Bader, Maxine Clark, Jim Eberlin, Bob Guller (Co-Founder), Chris Haffenreffer, Sanjay Jain, Courtney Leiendecker, Sandra Moore, Joe Schlafly (Co-Founder), Richard Tao
- Website: www.archgrants.org

Arch Grants is a Missouri non-profit corporation whose mission is to advance economic development through entrepreneurship.

== History ==
Founded in 2011, Arch Grants started as an initiative to bolster the St. Louis economy by supporting startups with potential for high growth.

As of November, 2025, Arch Grants has funded 291 companies that have generated $1.3 billion in revenue, attracted $870 million in additional capital, and created over 4,100 new jobs with $239 million in payroll in the St. Louis region. In addition, 60% of the companies awarded are still headquartered in St. Louis.

Arch Grants have been noted in media including The Wall Street Journal, Businessweek, Forbes, The Huffington Post, TechCrunch, and NPR as well as several local media channels including the Saint Louis Business Journal and Saint Louis Magazine.

== See also ==
- Kranzberg Arts Foundation
