= Kranzberg Arts Foundation =

Coordinates: 38.636516°N 90.226299°W

The Kranzberg Arts Foundation
- Named after: Ken and Nancy Kranzberg
- Formation: 2006; 20 years ago
- Founder: Ken Kranzberg, Nancy Kranzberg
- Founded at: St. Louis, Missouri, United States
- Type: Non-profit foundation
- Headquarters: St. Louis, Missouri, United States
- Region served: Midwest
- CEO: Chris Hansen
- Website: www.kranzbergartsfoundation.org

The Kranzberg Arts Foundation or Kranzberg Arts Foundation is a non-profit foundation dedicated to promoting arts, music, orchestra, jazz, theater, and culture in St. Louis, Missouri, United States. The Kranzberg Arts Foundation is responsible for the creation and growth of the Midtown St. Louis Neighborhood which includes the Grand Center Arts District.

The Kranzberg Arts Foundation supports 43 arts organizations.

== Affordable Artist Housing and Studios ==
In June 2018, Kranzberg Arts Foundation announced a program with the Regional Arts Commission to purchase 25 properties and develop them into affordable housing and studios for artists.

The program began housing artists in 2023.

== Music at the Intersection ==
The Kranzberg Arts Foundation presents a large annual music festival called Music at the Intersection in the Grand Center Arts District in St. Louis featuring national and local musical performers.

Notable performers at the 2021 Music at the Intersection festival included Gregory Porter, Roy Ayers, Lalah Hathaway, Jon Cleary, Janet Evra, Keyon Harrold, Bettye LaVette, and others.

Notable performers at the 2022 Music at the Intersection festival included Erykah Badu, Kamasi Washington, Buddy Guy, Robert Glasper, John Scofield, and others.

Notable performers at the 2023 Music at the Intersection festival included Herbie Hancock, The Bad Plus, Snarky Puppy, Dianne Reeves, Peter Martin, Angela Winbush, Thundercat, Arrested Development, and others.

Notable performers at the 2024 Music at the Intersection festival included Chaka Khan, Trombone Shorty, Samara Joy, Black Pumas, Esperanza Spalding, Chingy, Lettuce, and others.

Notable performers at the 2025 Music at the Intersection festival included Common, Patti LaBelle, Leon Thomas, Branford Marsalis, De La Soul, Lucky Daye, The Baylor Project, and others.

== Venues ==
- .ZACK
- The Big Top
- The Kranzberg
- The Dark Room at The Grandel
- Grandel Theater
- The Marcelle
- Sophie's Artist Lounge and Cocktail Club

== Galleries ==
- The Dark Room
- The Kranzberg Gallery

== See also ==
- Grand Center Arts District
- Arch Grants
