= KWMU =

Public radio station in St. Louis

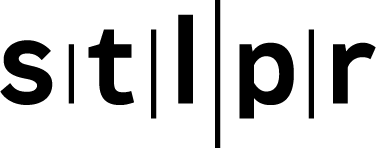
- St. Louis, Missouri; United States
- Broadcast area: Greater St. Louis
- Frequency: 90.7 MHz (HD Radio)

Programming
- Format: Public radio and talk
- Subchannels: HD2: Jazz; HD3: Classical
- Affiliations: NPR; APM; PRX; BBC World Service

Ownership
- Owner: University of Missouri-St. Louis (sale to Friends of KWMU pending); (The Curators of the University of Missouri)
- Sister stations: KMST, WQUB

History
- First air date: June 2, 1972

Technical information
- Licensing authority: FCC
- Facility ID: 65585
- Class: C1
- ERP: 100,000 watts
- HAAT: 289 meters (948 ft)
- Transmitter coordinates: 38°34′50″N 90°19′45″W

Links
- Public license information: Public file; LMS
- Webcast: Listen live
- Website: www.stlpr.org

KWMU (90.7 FM) is a non-commercial radio station licensed to St. Louis, Missouri, United States. It airs a public radio format of news, talk and information as an NPR member. KWMU is operated by St. Louis Public Radio (STLPR), with its license held by the Curators of the University of Missouri System. The studios are on the campus of the University of Missouri–St. Louis on Olive Street in Grand Center near the campus of Saint Louis University.

KWMU's transmitter is on Trianon Parkway Drive in Shrewsbury. In addition to a standard analog transmission, KWMU broadcasts in HD Radio: the HD2 digital subchannel carries a jazz format, while the HD3 subchannel plays classical music. STLPR also broadcasts on KMST (88.5 FM) in Rolla, Missouri, and WQUB (90.3 FM) in Quincy, Illinois.

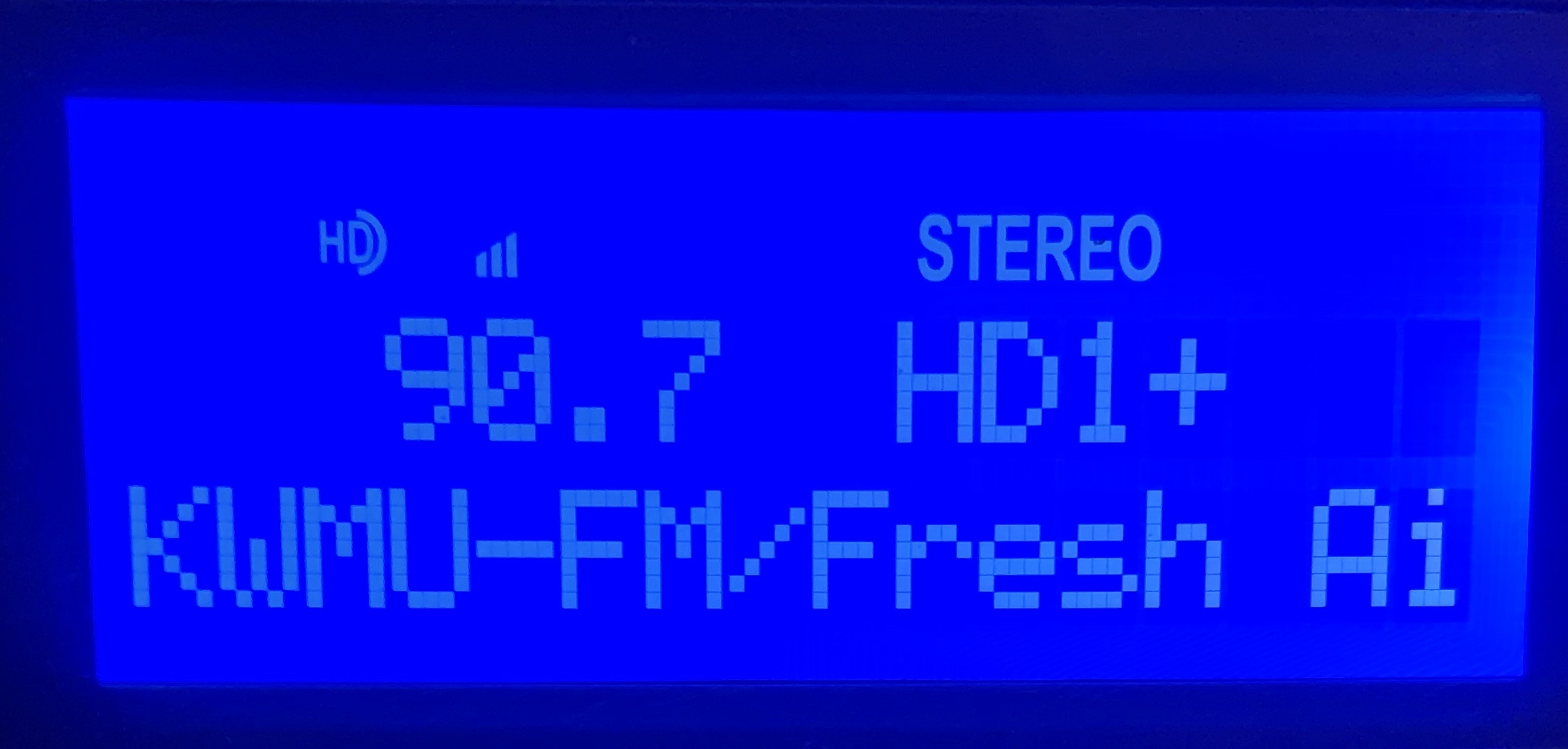

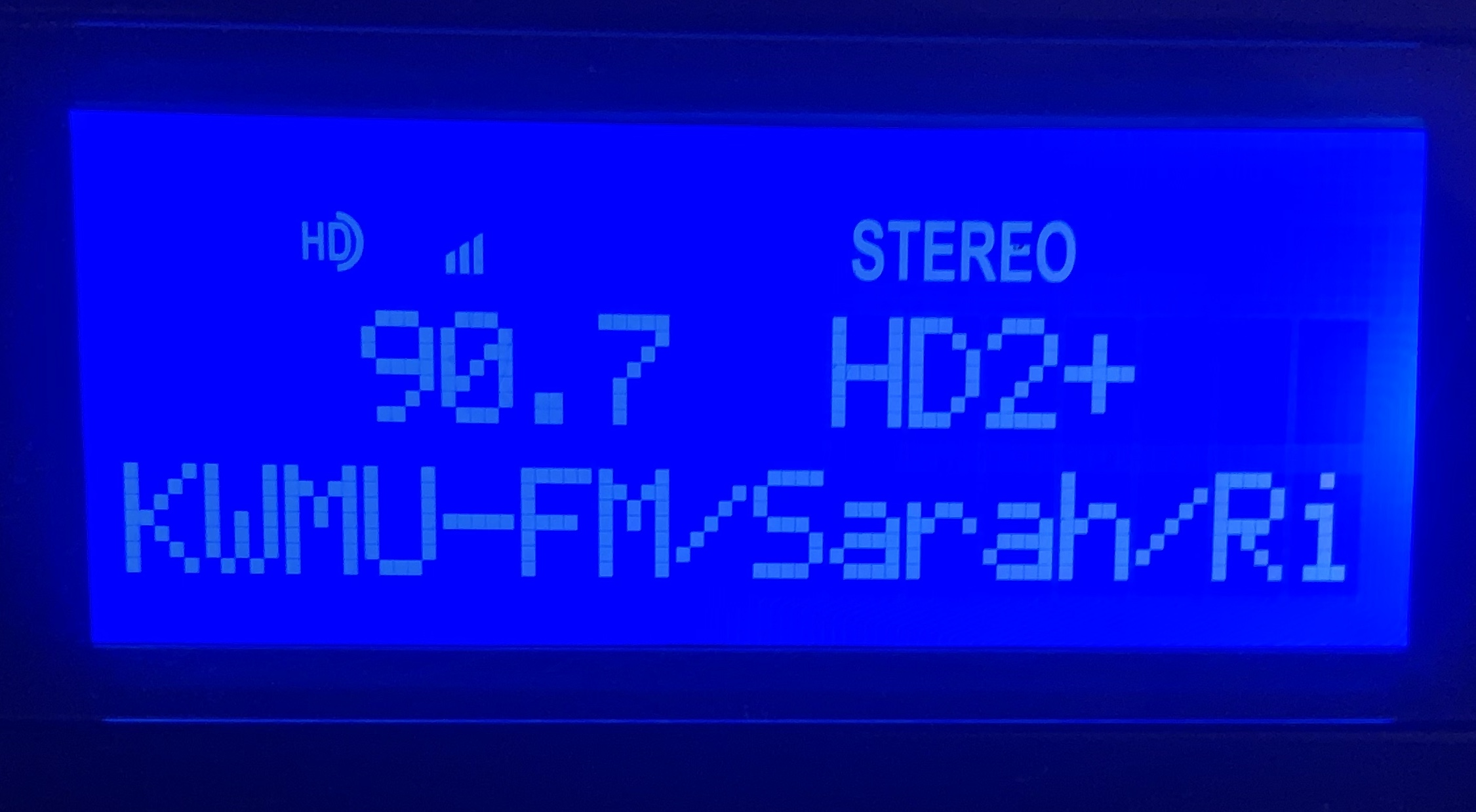

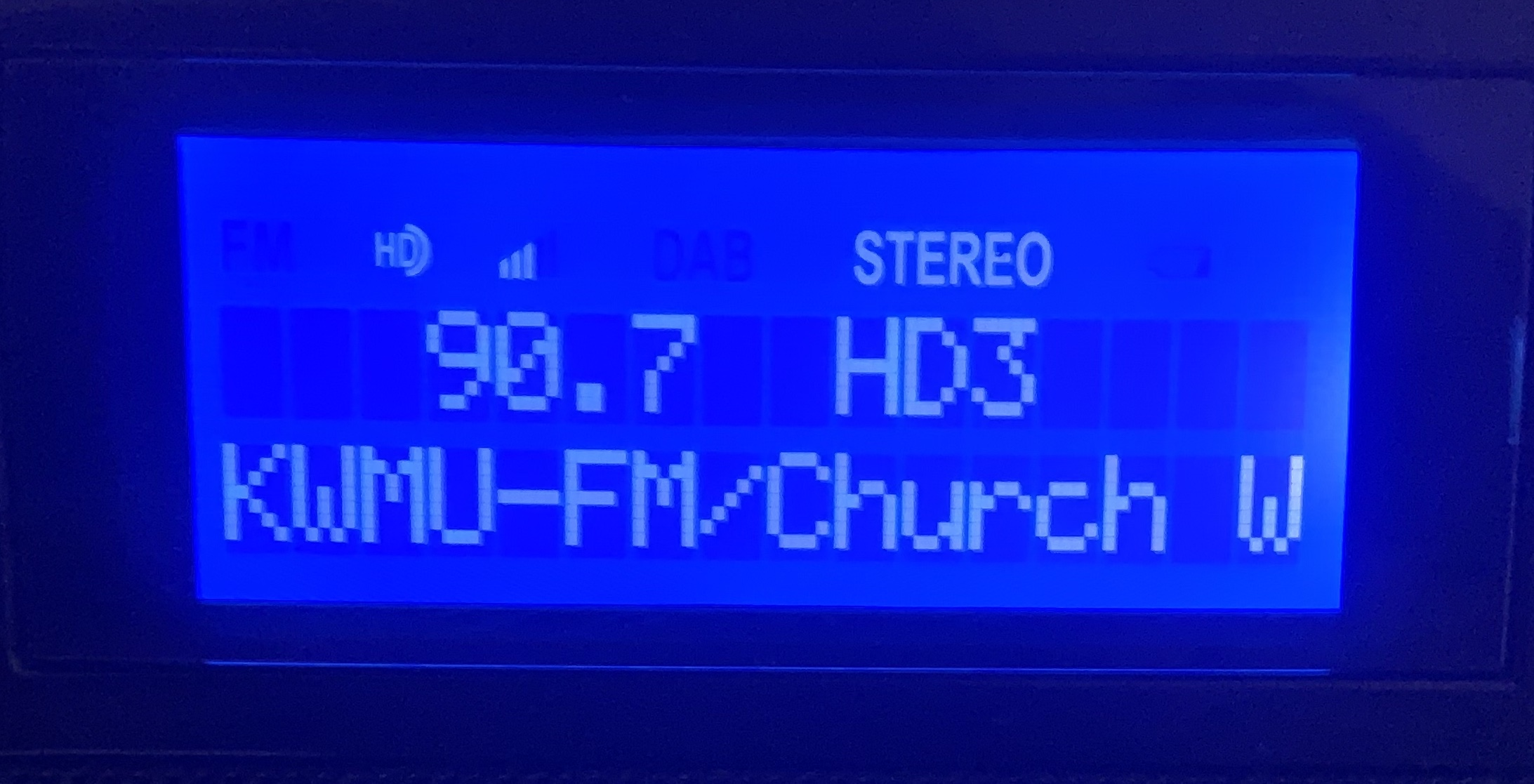
KWMU broadcasting in HD including all of the subchannels.

== History ==
=== Early years ===
KWMU signed on the air on June 2, 1972. In its early years, KWMU broadcast from studios on Natural Bridge Road on the UMSL campus. The format was "Fine Arts and News." The reference to fine arts included classical music, opera and other musical genres not found on commercial radio. KWMU also used ABC Radio News for audio clips during newscasts.

In 1983, it was the first radio station in St. Louis to play music from compact discs. A year later, it became the first radio station in the United States to broadcast Ambisonic programs.

In 1992, the station increased its effective radiated power to 100,000 watts. In 1995, the station eliminated the remaining weekday music programs and moved to an all-news and talk format, except for a few specialty shows on weekend nights.

=== HD Radio ===
KWMU started using HD Radio technology to broadcast in 2006. In the fall of 2008, the station added a second digital stream, KWMU-2 The Gateway (Now Jazz KWMU-2), on its second digital subcarrier. It also plays adult album alternative music, world music and other genres. In the spring of 2010, the station added a third digital subchannel, Classical 90.7 KWMU-3, a 24-hour classical music service. Both stream live on the Internet.

On September 10, 2009, KWMU rebranded as St. Louis Public Radio (STLPR). Its website switched to a new address: stlpublicradio.org.

In September 2010, STLPR became the radio outlet for live broadcasts of the St. Louis Symphony Orchestra. It airs Saturday night concerts from Powell Symphony Hall.

In April 2011, STLPR broke ground on a state-of-the-art studio facility on Olive Street at Grand Center. The facility also houses academic space for UMSL. On June 18, 2012, STLPR moved from its longtime home on the first floor of Lucas Hall on the UMSL North campus in Bellerive, to the new facility.

On July 26, 2012, UMSL officially acquired WQUB from Quincy University. The station now serves as a semi-satellite of KWMU in the Illinois-Iowa-Missouri Tri-State Area.

Beginning July 1, 2017, UMSL also began broadcasting on 88.5 KMST in Rolla as a satellite of KWMU for south-central Missouri.

=== Independence ===
On February 10, 2025, St. Louis Public Radio announced UMSL will be transferring the licenses for KWMU, KMST, and WQUB to Friends of KWMU, Inc.

=== St. Louis Public Radio Mission Statement ===
St. Louis Public Radio's website states that its mission is "to inform and provide a deeper understanding and appreciation of events, ideas and cultures for a more inspired and engaged public." STLPR has more than 500,000 listeners in the St. Louis area.

The station employs more than 30 journalists and has a total staff of over 70. There are also scores of volunteers helping for special events.

=== Finances ===
The station receives its funding from private donations, corporate sponsors, local, regional and national grants, as well as the University of Missouri-St. Louis.

In Fiscal Year 2019, STLPR's revenue totaled $8,856,000. Its sources were from:

- 92% Community Support
- 6% Corporation for Public Broadcasting & Missouri Public Broadcasting
- 2% Other Grants

Revenue from Community Support totaled $8,130,000. Its sources were from:

- 74% Individual & Foundation Support
- 22% Corporate Support
- 4% Events and Other Support

== Programming ==
On weekdays, KWMU carries news and information programs from NPR and other public radio networks, including Morning Edition, All Things Considered, Fresh Air, 1A, Here and Now, Marketplace and The World. The station produces a weekday one-hour show focusing on local news and interviews, St. Louis on the Air hosted by Elaine Cha. It airs at noon and is repeated at 7 p.m. Late nights, the BBC World Service is heard. Most hours also feature news briefs from the KWMU staff.
