= Janet Evra =

Jazz musician

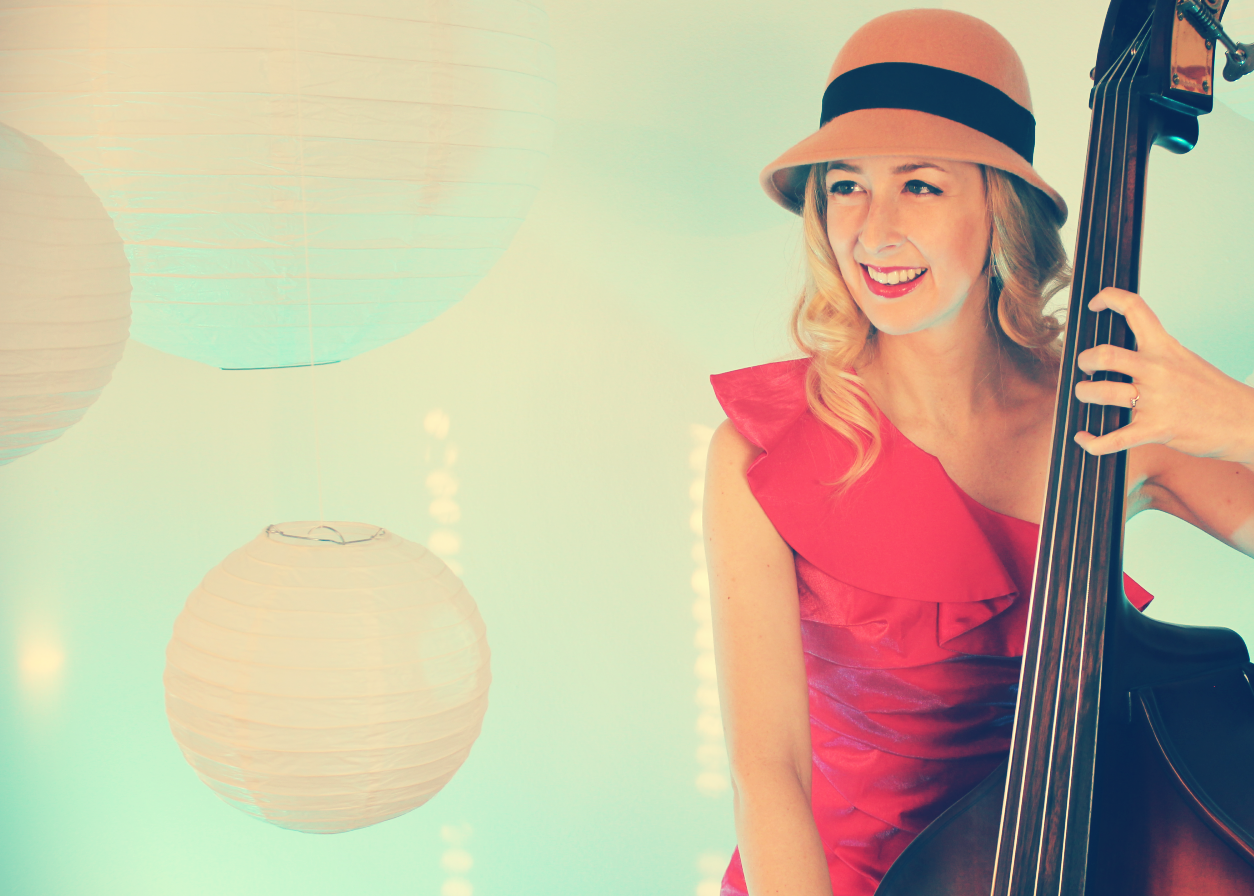

Background information
- Born: Janet Kimberley Irvine; July 4, 1988 (age 37)
- Origin: Gloucester, England
- Genres: Latin jazz, samba, jazz, indie jazz, French jazz, bossa nova
- Occupation: Jazz singer/bassist
- Labels: Lotown, Plum Jazz
- Website: janetevra.com

Janet Irvine Buchanan (born 4 July 1988), popularly known as Janet Evra, is an English-born vocalist, bassist, guitarist, songwriter and bandleader. Evra sings in English, Spanish, Portuguese, and French and performs in jazz, indie jazz, French jazz, bossa nova, samba, and Latin jazz styles.

== Early life ==
Janet Irvine was born in Gloucester, England. She grew up in a musical household and learned the piano, cello, and guitar as a child.

She was a member of Cheltenham indie rock band Knave in 2006, performing on vocals and rhythm guitar.

She received a B.A. from Principia College in Elsah, Illinois, and a M.S. from the University of Michigan School for Environment and Sustainability in Ann Arbor, Michigan. She then lived in Alton, Illinois and worked in the sustainability field for an environmental non-profit. She then moved to St. Louis, Missouri.

== Career ==
Evra performs at music festivals and concerts in the US and Europe. She has performed shows in Sweden and Switzerland and at the 2019 Deva Jazz Festival in Romania, the 2021 Linna Jazz Festival in Finland, and the 2023 Brecon Jazz Festival and 2025 Watford Jazz Junction festival in the United Kingdom.

Evra released her debut album Ask Her to Dance in 2018. In 2019 Evra released 'Wish You Were Here', a single, and in 2020 she released singles 'Summer Love Song', 'Floating on Life', and 'I'd Rather Be Lonely With You'. Evra signed with Lotown Records in 2020. In 2021 Evra released her second album, Janet Evra & Ptah Williams: New Friends, Old Favorites. In 2022 Evra signed with Plum Jazz and released her third album, Hello Indie Bossa. In 2023 Evra released a single 'Almost True' featuring Randy Brecker; also in 2023 Evra released her fourth album, Meet Me in Paris, a French jazz-themed record which JAZZIZ awarded "Album of the Week". In 2024 Evra released singles 'Summer Nights are for Loving' featuring Taylor Eigsti, 'Tenderly' featuring Diego Figueiredo, and 'Kiss Me and You'll Find Out' featuring Jeff Coffin. In 2025 Evra released two albums: Kiss Me and You'll Find Out and Love in Rio featuring Chad LB. She also released singles "It's Late, But Not Too Late" featuring Bob Reynolds, "Cold Cold Rain", "Safe Harbor" featuring Al Di Meola, "Fever", "Wave", and "One in the Morning". In 2026 Evra released singles "Cobra" and "Cry Me a River" featuring Victor Goines.

Evra is an Artist in Residence at The Sheldon in St. Louis. Evra was a 2019-2020 Artist in Residence at the Kranzberg Arts Foundation, also in St. Louis.

Evra has collaborated with Randy Brecker, Taylor Eigsti, Marcus Miller, Al Di Meola, Victor Goines, Veronica Swift, Andrea Motis, Wycliffe Gordon, Tracy Silverman, Bob Reynolds, Dave Weckl, Sara Gazarek, Mohini Dey, Severi Pyysalo, Yusa, Jeff Coffin, Roy Wooten, Eric Marienthal, Chad Lefkowitz-Brown, Diego Figueiredo, Gregory Hutchinson, and Alex Hutchings, among other musicians.

Evra is the co-creator of St. Louis Music Box, a social media music video series featuring St. Louis musicians and special guests performing jazz arrangements of 60s and 70s pop and Motown hits.

Evra also leads the musical group The Bon Bon Plot performing French jazz music.

== Personal life ==
Evra is married to Will Buchanan, a guitarist and producer. The two regularly perform together.

== Discography ==
Albums

- Love in Rio feat Chad LB (Plum Jazz 2025)
- Kiss Me and You'll Find Out (Plum Jazz 2025)
- Meet Me in Paris (Plum Jazz 2023)
- Hello Indie Bossa (Plum Jazz 2022)
- Janet Evra & Ptah Williams: New Friends and Old Favorites (Live at the Sheldon) (Lotown Records 2021)
- Ask Her to Dance (Self-published 2018, re-released by Plum Jazz 2022)

Singles

- "Cry Me a River" feat Victor Goines (2026)
- "Cobra" (2026)
- "One in the Morning" (2025)
- "Wave" (2025)
- "Fever" (2025)
- "Safe Harbor" feat Al Di Meola (2025)
- "Cold Cold Rain" (2025)
- "It's Late, But Not Too Late" feat Bob Reynolds (2025)
- "Kiss Me and You'll Find Out" feat Jeff Coffin (2024)
- "Dancing By Myself" (2024)
- "Tenderly" feat Diego Figueiredo (2024)
- "Summer Nights Are For Loving" feat Taylor Eigsti (2024)
- "C'est Si Bon" (2023)
- "Almost True" feat Randy Brecker (2023)
- "Summer Love Song" 2022
- "Call Me" (2022)
- "Come Home Tonight" (2022)
