= Gentleman Auction House =

American indie rock band

- Origin: St. Louis, Missouri
- Genres: Indie rock
- Years active: 2005–present
- Labels: Emergency Umbrella Records
- Members: Eric Enger, Steve Kozel, Kiley Kozel, Eric Herbst, Ryan Adams, Stephen Tomko
- Past members: Mike Tomko, Mike Walker
- Website: gentlemanauctionhouse.blogspot.com%20gentlemanauctionhouse.blogspot.com

Gentleman Auction House is an American indie rock band from St. Louis, Missouri; they are currently signed to Emergency Umbrella Records. The band was formed in 2005 as a project for lead singer Eric Enger to record and perform his songs. The band consists of Enger, Steve Kozel, Kiley Kozel, Eric Herbst, Ryan Adams, and Stephen Tomko. Gentleman Auction House was named "Best Indie Band" in 2009 by the Riverfront Times.

The band has toured across the United States. They have also played several festivals, including Diversafest, South by Southwest, Pygmalion Music Festival, and the CMJ Music Marathon; they have also been featured on Fearless Music TV and Daytrotter.

== Discography ==
- The Rules Were Handed Down (2006, self-released)
- The Book Of Matches EP (2008, Emergency Umbrella Records)
- Alphabet Graveyard (2008, Emergency Umbrella Records)
- Christmas In Love (2008, Emergency Umbrella Records)
