= Grand Center Arts District, St. Louis =

Neighborhood of St. Louis in Missouri, US

Coordinates: 38.6427°N 90.2305°W

Grand Center Arts District
- Neighborhood of St. Louis
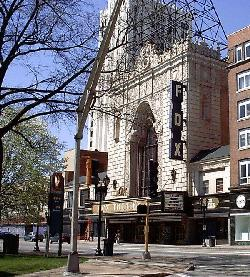
- The Fox Theatre is one of the largest theatres in Grand Center.

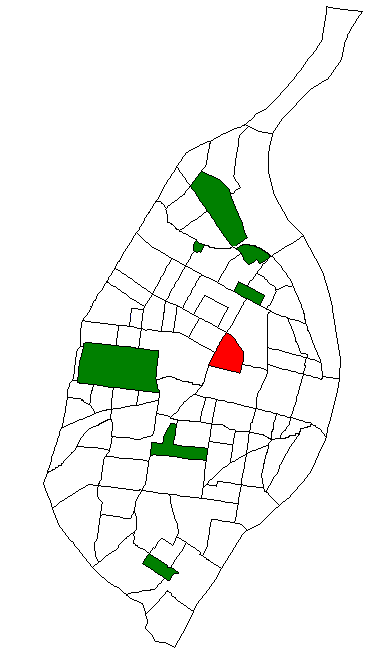
- Location (red) of Covenant Blu Grand Center within St. Louis
- Country: United States
- State: Missouri
- City: St. Louis
- Wards: 11

Government
  - Aldermen: Laura Keys

Area
  - Total: 0.57 sq mi (1.5 km^{2})

Population (2020)
  - Total: 3,041
  - Density: 5,300/sq mi (2,100/km^{2})
- ZIP code(s): Parts of 63106, 63108, 63113
- Area code(s): 314
- Website: stlouis-mo.gov

The Grand Center Arts District is located in St. Louis, Missouri, north of the Saint Louis University campus. Referred to colloquially as Grand Center, the neighborhood's formal name is Covenant Blu Grand Center. The neighborhood is a member of the Global Cultural Districts Network.

Grand Center is the site of numerous arts and entertainment venues including the Fox Theatre, Powell Symphony Hall (home of the St. Louis Symphony Orchestra), the Contemporary Art Museum Saint Louis, the Pulitzer Arts Foundation, the Sheldon Concert Hall, Clyde C. Miller Career Academy, and Jazz St. Louis.

The neighborhood is an eclectic mix of restored historic structures and newer buildings with street art and neon signage centered on Strauss Park at the intersection of Grand Boulevard and Washington Ave. It includes Third Baptist Church, St. Alphonsus Liguori Catholic Church the St. Louis Black Repertory Theatre Company, the Grand Center Arts Academy, KDHX Community Media, St. Louis Public Radio (KWMU), the Kranzberg Arts Center, and the headquarters of the Nine Network of Public Media (KETC), a PBS affiliate. It is served by the Grand MetroLink station.

== Gallery ==
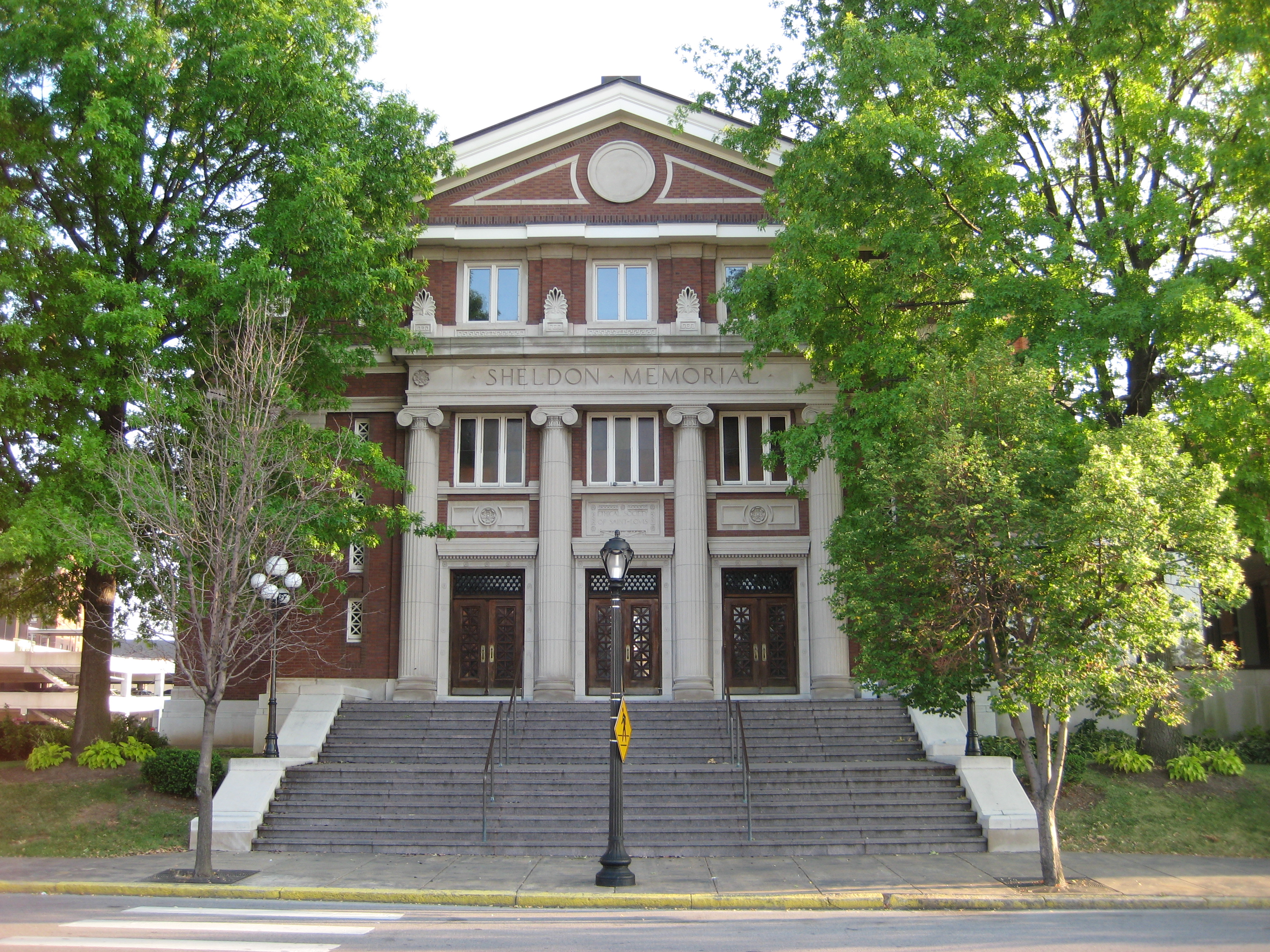
The Sheldon Concert Hall, built 1912

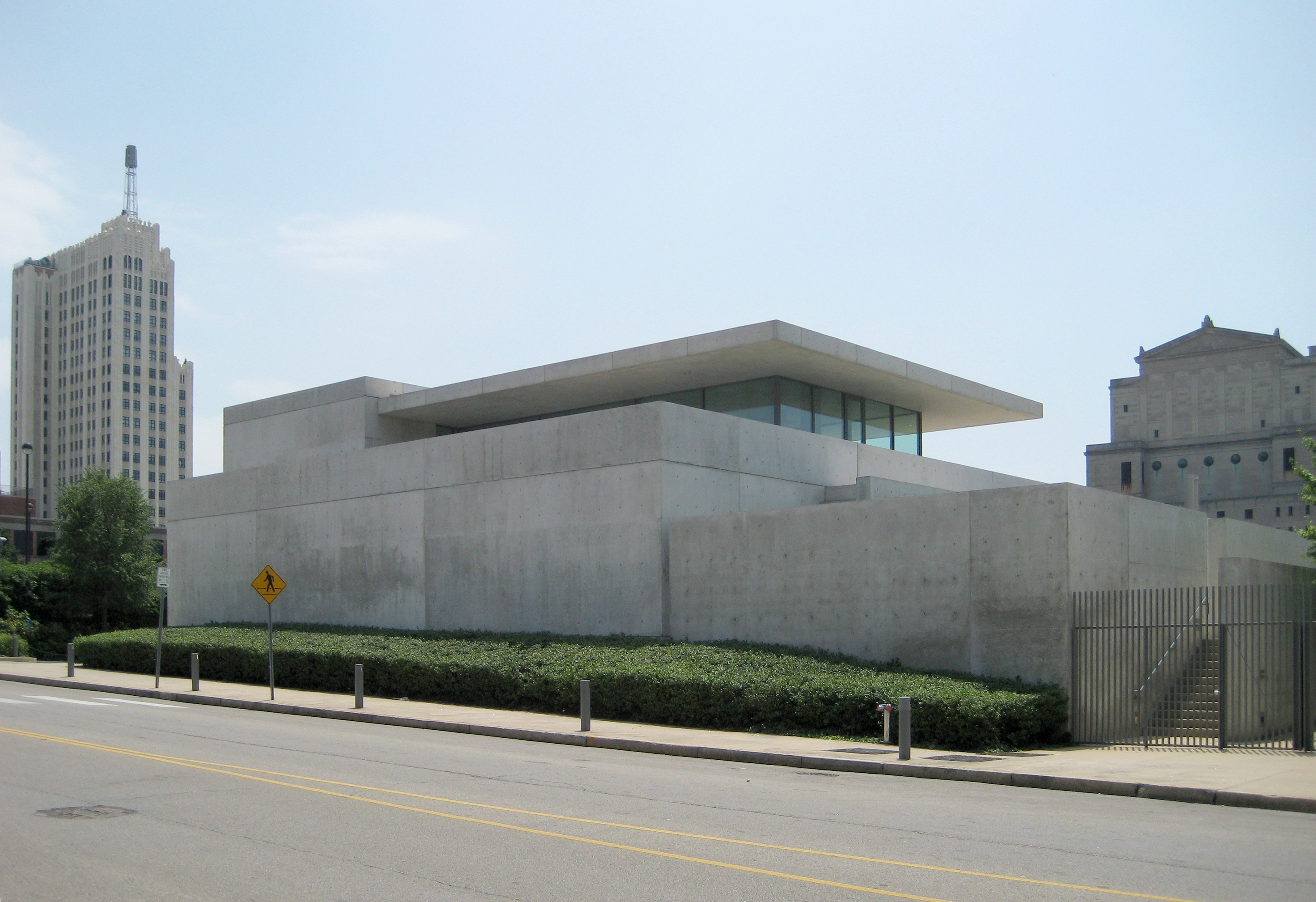
Pulitzer Arts Foundation, 2001

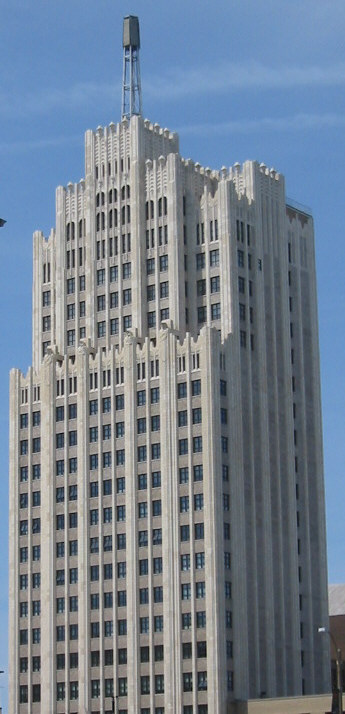
The Continental Life Building, dates from the 1930s

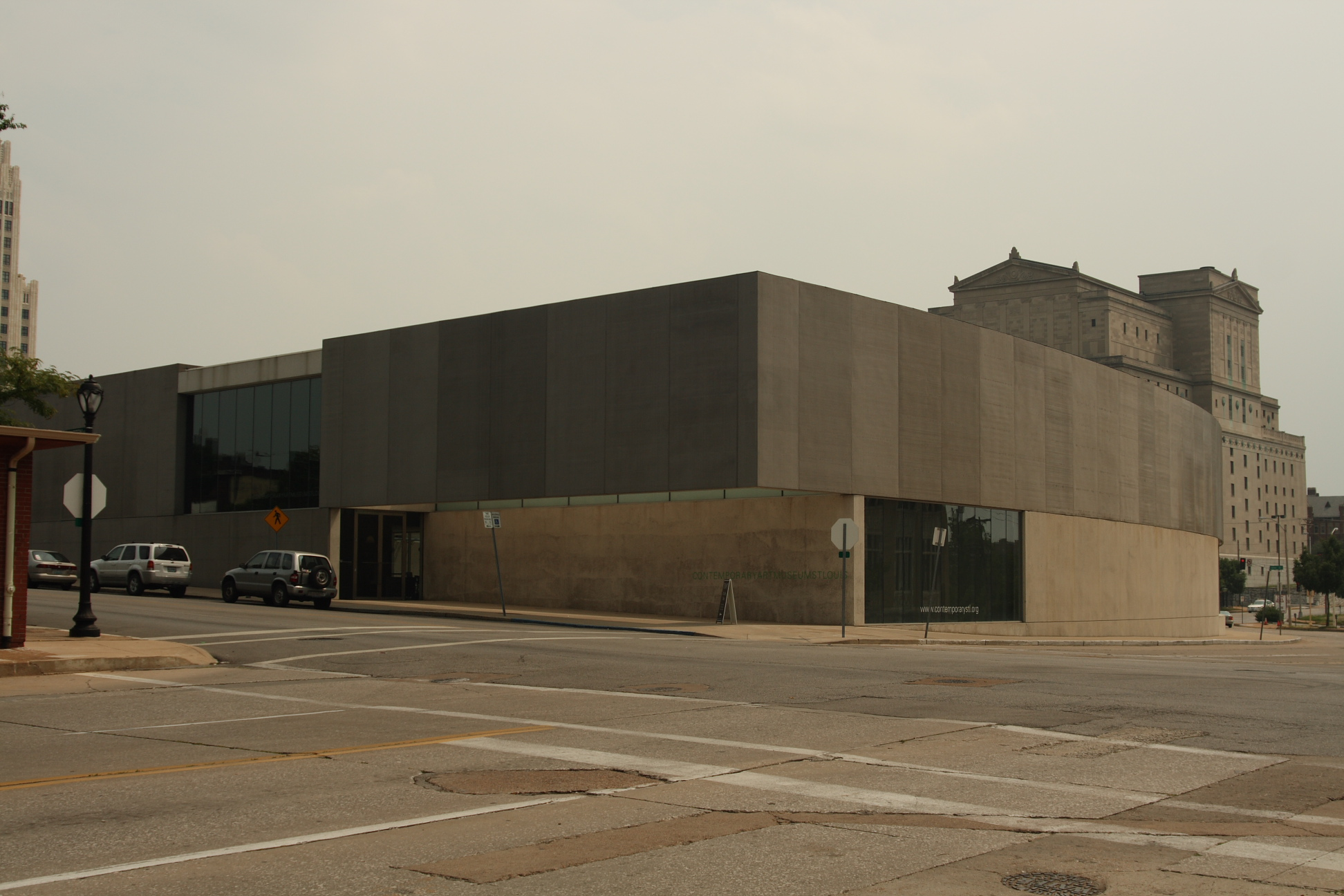
Contemporary Art Museum St. Louis, 2003

Powell Symphony Hall, built in 1925

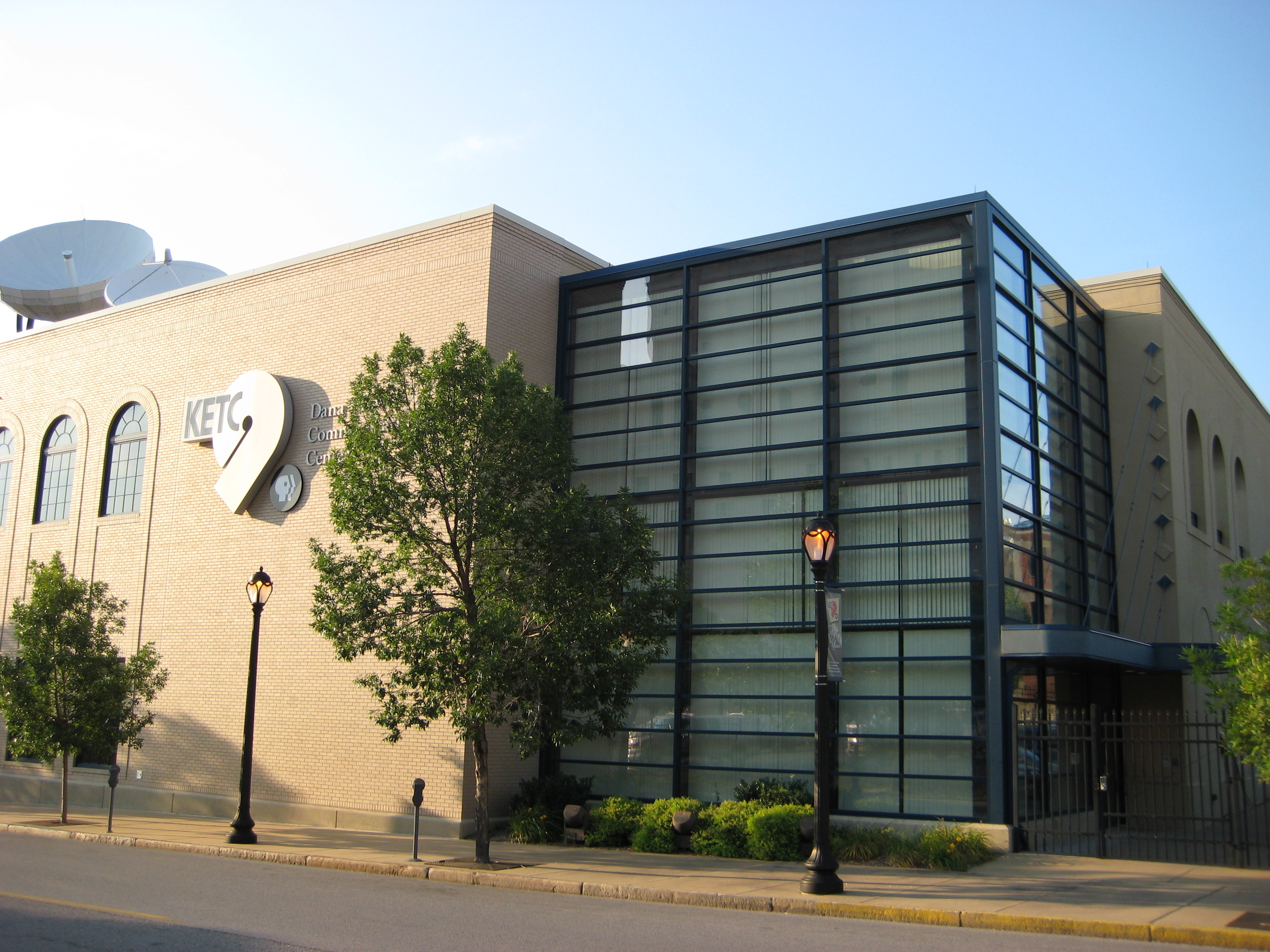
Nine Network public television station studios and headquarters, 1998

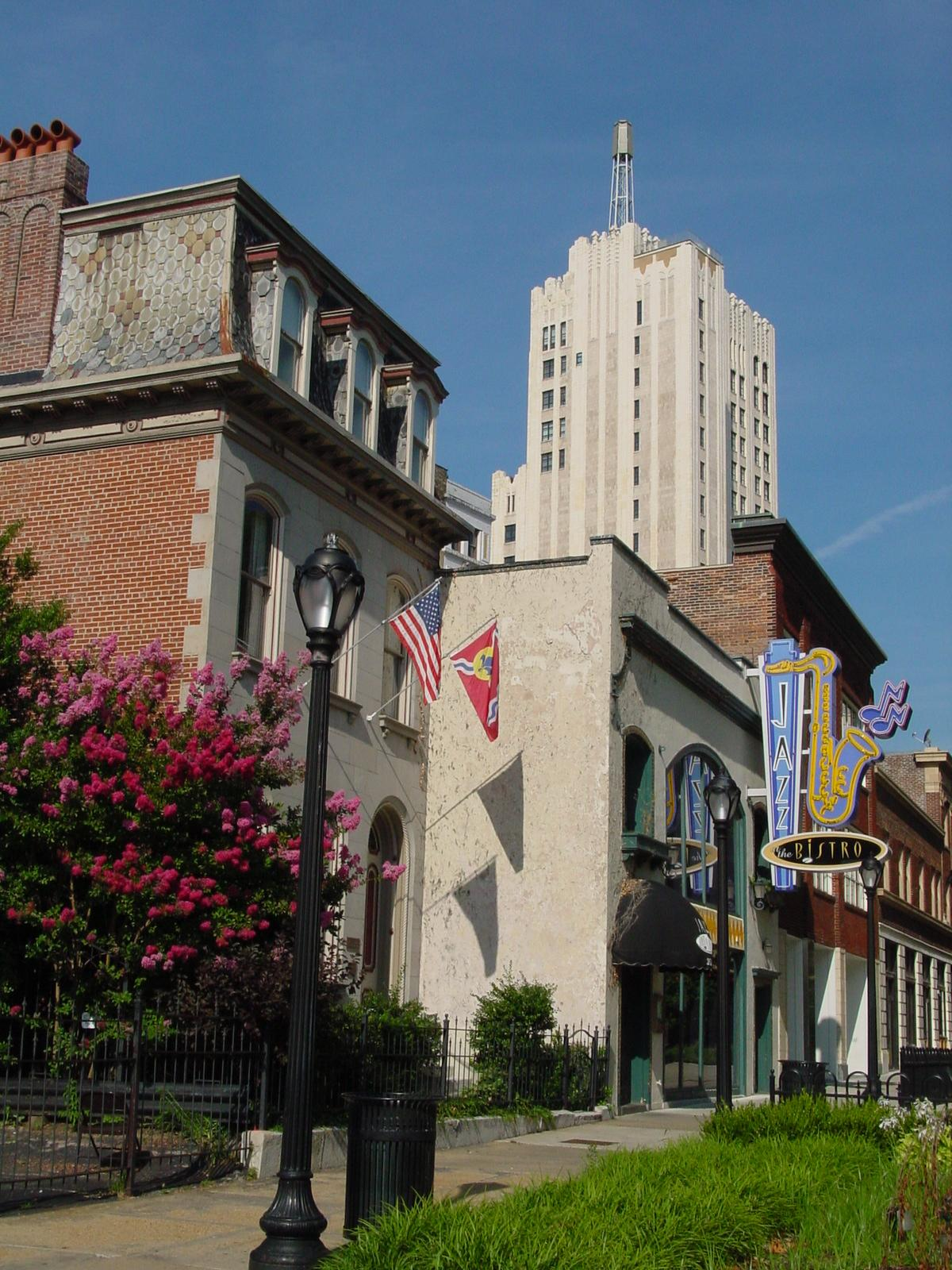
City House (1874), Jazz St. Louis, and Continental Life Building

== Demographics ==
Historical population
Year	Pop.	±%
1990	4,175	—
2000	2,758	−33.9%
2010	3,562	+29.2%
2020	3,041	−14.6%

In 2020 Grand Center's population was 53.1% Black, 31.1% White, 8.7% Asian, 4.4% Two or More Races, and 2.6% Some Other Race. 5.2% of the population was of Hispanic or Latino origin.

Racial composition	1990	2000	2010	2020
White	24.6%	18.9%	35.0%	31.1%
Black or African American	72.9%	77.7%	56.3%	53.1%
Hispanic or Latino (of any race)		2.5%	2.3%	5.2%
Asian		1.1%	6.5%	8.7%

== See also ==
- Midtown St. Louis
- Grand Boulevard (St. Louis)
- Neighborhoods of St. Louis
- Kranzberg Arts Foundation
- Cortex Innovation Community
