= Third Baptist Church (St. Louis) =

Church building in Missouri, United States

Coordinates: 38.6393°N 90.2312°W

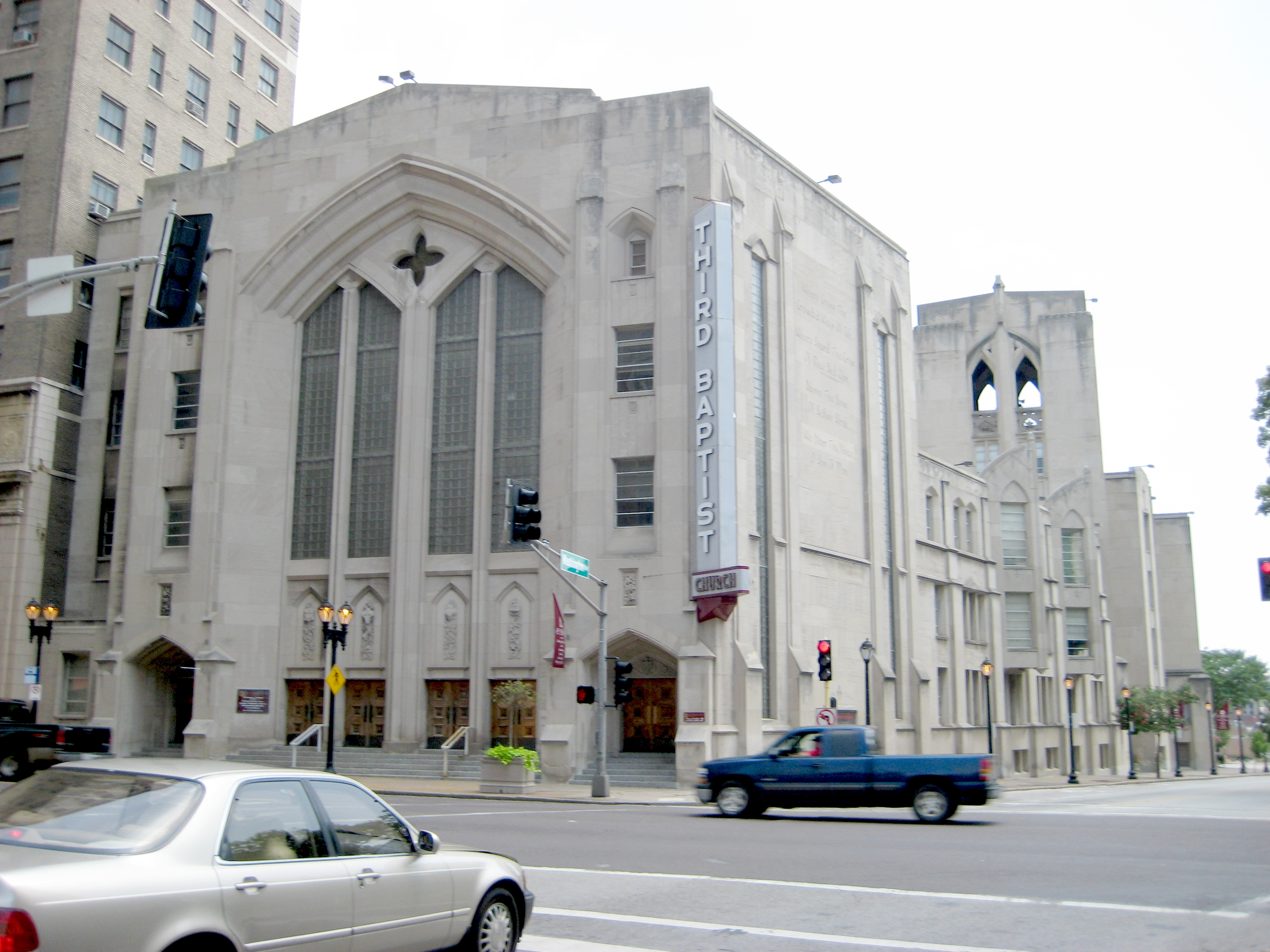
Third Baptist Church

Third Baptist Church is a Baptist church in the United States located in St. Louis, Missouri. It is affiliated with American Baptist Churches USA and the Cooperative Baptist Fellowship and supports the work of the Baptist World Alliance. Third Baptist Church was established in 1850, and moved to its current location at the corner of Grand Boulevard and Washington Avenue in 1885.

Third Baptist, one of the nation's historic churches, has for 150 years avoided strict denominationalism, and relies on the Baptist distinctives of:

- Autonomy of the Local Church
- Soul Competency of the Individual Believer
- Biblical Authority
- Two Ordinances (Baptism and Lord's Table or Communion)
- Separation of church and state
