= Regional Arts Commission =

Regional Arts Commission of St. Louis
- Formation: 1985
- Headquarters: St. Louis
- CEO and President: Vanessa Cooksey
- Website: racstl.org

Regional Arts Commission of St. Louis or RAC is an organization located in St. Louis, Missouri, United States promoting arts and culture in the region.

Regional Arts Commission of St. Louis is the largest public funder of arts in the St. Louis region. Since its inception in 1985, RAC has awarded more than 7,000 grants totaling more than $100 million.

In 2018, the commission received $6.4 million in tax money. $3.8 million were awarded through a grants process to the arts community including 125 organizations, including the largest grantee at US$413,276 for the St. Louis Symphony, and the smallest grant of US$500 to an individual working the arts. Another portion of that money is used for a program called the Community Arts Training (CAT) Institute, a program with a 22 year track record which trains both artists of all disciplines and community members in how to use arts to effect change in their community. RAC also supports local conferences, events, workshops, and public art projects. The remainder of the funds support operations including salaries and building costs as well as a reserve fund. RAC has 15 full and part-time employees. The Commission's board is appointed by the Mayor of St. Louis and by the County Executive and is made up of 13 civic volunteers.

The current director is Vanessa Cooksey. Cooksey has more than 25 years of business and civic leadership experience. She's held marketing, communications and philanthropy leadership positions with a variety of companies including Mary Kay, The City of Atlanta Mayor's Office, Cartoon Network, Anheuser-Busch, Wells Fargo and Washington University in St. Louis.

== History ==
The Regional Arts Commission was founded in 1985 through a state charter and functions as a grantor and leader in the arts. RAC receives its primary funding from a portion of the hotel/motel tax collected from both St. Louis City and St. Louis County.

== Current Programs and Grants ==
General Operating Support Grants - The Regional Arts Commission's General Operating Support Grants are unrestricted funds that can be used to cover any of a nonprofit's expenses.

Program Support Grants - The Regional Arts Commission's Program Support grant category provides project-based support to arts and culture organizations and non-arts nonprofit organizations in the production and/or presentation of artistic activities.

Artist Support Grants - The Regional Arts Commission's Artist Support Grant serves as funding for the career advancement of individual artists. This grant provides funds for an individual artist's projects, needs, or creative opportunities in all artistic disciplines.

Gyo Obata Fellowship - The Gyo Obata Fellowship is a program for undergraduate students pursuing careers in arts management. With major funding provided by the Gateway Foundation, the program will address the need for a more diverse, inclusive, and equitable local nonprofit arts and culture sector.

Community Arts Training Institute - The Community Arts Training (CAT) Institute identifies dedicated participants who seek to learn about the use of the arts in community settings, to develop their collaboration skills, and to explore new concepts and ways of working. The Community Arts Training Institute is the oldest sustained training program of its kind in the country.

InSITE STL - InSITE STL is a group of site-specific, temporary public artworks in downtown St. Louis in 2022.

In 2018, RAC announced in press event titled, The Big Reveal, the first comprehensive creative vision for St. Louis, a 90-page report and website, created through a US$250,000 study paid for from RAC's marketing budget and corporate donations.

In 2018, effects of the change in granting process effected some groups.

== St. Louis Art Place Project ==
In 2018, along with the Kranzberg Arts Foundation and the Incarnate Word Foundation, RAC created the St. Louis Art Place Project as a way to provide inexpensive housing and studio space to artist's in the St. Louis Gravois Park neighborhood.

== See also ==
- Kranzberg Arts Foundation
