= Counting the Cost (memoir) =

2023 book about Jill Duggar

- Author: Jill Duggar Dillard
- Language: English
- Publisher: Gallery Books
- Publication date: September 12, 2023
- Publication place: New York
- Media type: Print, ebook, audio
- ISBN: 9781668024447 (First edition hardcover)

Counting the Cost is a 2023 memoir by Jill Duggar Dillard, which was also written with Derick Dillard and Craig Borlase. The book describes Jill's childhood and her experiences as a wife, mother, and missionary. She also describes growing apart from her parents and letting them have less control over her life.

== Summary ==
Jill describes her childhood growing up in a family affiliated with the Institute in Basic Life Principles. At first, her family attended a church with more progressive Christians, while still adhering to the strict principles they had been taught. Their attendance at that church ended after the children were shown a Christmas dance. She faced many restrictions growing up due to her family's religious beliefs, such as not being allowed to watch television or dance. She also explains several common Duggar family sayings, such as "Nike," which is a warning that someone dressed immodestly was nearby, "not stirring up contention among the brethren," referring to avoiding conflict or criticism within the family or church community, and "window of opportunity," used to describe a period in which a woman was considered eligible for courtship. The family gained prominence after their father's failed run for Senate and went on to film five documentaries. After those became hits, TLC began filming 17 Kids and Counting. This financial success allowed the family to move into a larger home and no longer struggle with basic expenses such as groceries.

She begins a courtship with Derick, who she is introduced to by her father on a phone call. He is serving a mission trip in Nepal. She meets him for the first time in a trip covered by the TV network. Eventually, they get married, but she should still follow her parents' authority under IBLP beliefs. This causes tension, as Jill realizes she doesn't like her most private moments becoming entertainment and Derick advocates for receiving some amount of financial compensation, while Jim Bob refuses to negotiate. Jill has to push back against network demands, like wanting to film their honeymoon and the birth of their first child. When details of her childhood abuse are released to the media, she experiences a secondary victimization through it becoming a public spectacle. TLC cancels the show and replaces it with Jill and Jessa: Counting On. The couple live in El Salvador as missionaries and they decide not to go to a Houston film shoot promoting the new show, which creates further family tension. Her parents organize a family meeting where they offer to give each of their adult children $80,000, but only if they sign a contract. The couple are skeptical of the contract and decide not to sign it and are later gifted the money instead. They encounter difficulties trying to leave the show, but are ultimately successful.

Jill experiences a uterine rupture while having her second child. While there were concerns about brain damage to the child as a result of oxygen deprivation, he was cleared as healthy by a neurologist at three months old. Jill struggles with guilt stemming from her childhood beliefs about large families being a blessing from God and uncertainty about whether to have additional children. The couple start attending a more mainstream church. Jill decides that it is okay for her to wear pants, consume alcohol in moderation, and get a nose piercing. Derick starts attending law school. The couple starts attending therapy together and hires a lawyer to advocate on their behalf. Jill finally receives the income that her father claimed she made on her tax returns. After Josh Duggar is investigated (and ultimately convicted) for child pornography, Jill is interviewed by Homeland Security. She is relieved that they have enough evidence to not need her to testify against him. However, her case against In Touch is dismissed shortly afterwards. She also gives birth to a third child through a cesarean section.

== Reception ==
The memoir was reviewed by the Los Angeles Times, which stated that it described "a critical — if also loving — portrait of family patriarch Jim Bob Duggar". An article by People concluded that the memoir dropped many "bombshells" such as Jim Bob misleading his daughter into signing a contract on the day she got married, that she had to wait a month to tell her family about her pregnancy to work around the show's filming schedule, and that she had not initially received compensation for her role on the show. Another reviewer stated that the book was required reading for people who were fans of 19 Kids and Counting.

== See also ==
- Faith deconstruction
