= Shiny Happy People (TV series) =

- Season 1 poster
- Also known as: Shiny Happy People: Duggar Family Secrets (season 1); Shiny Happy People: A Teenage Holy War (season 2)
- Genre: Docuseries
- Directed by: Olivia Crist; Julia Willoughby Nason
- Country of origin: United States
- Original language: English
- No. of seasons: 2
- No. of episodes: 7

Production
- Executive producers: Blye Pagon Faust; Cori Shepherd Stern; Mike Gasparro; Jenner Furst; Jody McVeigh-Schultz; Julia Willoughby Nason; Olivia Crist
- Cinematography: Brandon Riley
- Production companies: The Cinemart; Story Force; Chick Entertainment; Amazon Studios

Original release
- Network: Prime Video
- Release: June 2, 2023 – July 23, 2025

Shiny Happy People is an American television documentary series centering on religious controversies in the United States. The series premiered on Prime Video on June 2, 2023. In June 2025, it was renewed for a second season, which premiered on July 23, 2025.

== Summary ==
The first season, subtitled Duggar Family Secrets, revolves around the controversies surrounding the Duggar family, best known for the TLC reality series 19 Kids and Counting; and their connection to the Institute in Basic Life Principles (IBLP). It investigates Josh Duggar's conviction for knowingly receiving and possessing child pornography, as well as the IBLP's leader Bill Gothard, showing how the organization influenced the Duggars. The influence of Christian youth organizations, including Generation Joshua, is also discussed in the documentary.

The second season, subtitled A Teenage Holy War, focuses on the "dark undercurrent" surrounding Teen Mania Ministries, co-founded and led by Ron Luce.

== Cast ==
- Jill Duggar Dillard
- Derick Dillard
- Deanna Duggar
- Amy King
- Dillon King
- Jinger Vuolo
- Jim Holt
- Bobye Holt
- Jennifer Sutphin
- Brooke Arnold
- Chad Harris
- Lindsey Williams
- Tia Levings
- Eve Ettinger
- Tara Oathout
- Floyd Oathout
- Emily Elizabeth Anderson
- Lara Smith
- Kristin Kobes Du Mez
- Josh Pease
- Alex Harris
- Danielle Lindemann
- Morgan Olliges
- Paul Olliges
- Bill Gothard

== Production ==
On December 22, 2021, it was reported that an untitled docuseries on the Duggar family and their association with the Institute in Basic Life Principles was in the works, to be produced by The Cinemart, Story Force, Chick Entertainment, and Amazon Studios.

The first season was directed and executive produced by Olivia Crist and Julia Willoughby Nason, and also executive produced by Cori Shepherd Stern, Blye Pagon Faust, Mike Gasparro, Jody McVeigh-Schultz, and Jenner Furst. Jill Duggar Dillard is the only one of the nineteen Duggar children to appear in Duggar Family Secrets, appearing alongside her husband, Derrick Dillard. The series also features Jim Bob Duggar's sister Deanna Duggar and her daughter Amy King, and includes interviews with survivors of the IBLP's alleged abuse.

== Release ==
The trailer was released on May 18, 2023, and the four-episode docuseries premiered on Prime Video on June 2, 2023.

In June 2025, Amazon announced that a second season would be released, this time focusing on Ron Luce's Teen Mania organization, a large Christian youth organization in the 1990s and 2000s that some accused of being a cult. The second season was directed by Nicole Newnham and Cori Shepherd, and premiered on July 23, 2025.

== Episodes ==
=== Season 1 (2023) ===
No.	Title	Original release date
1	"Meet The Duggars"	June 2, 2023
2	"Growing up Gothard"	June 2, 2023
3	"Under Authority"	June 2, 2023
4	"Arrows Activated"	June 2, 2023

=== Season 2 (2025) ===
No.	Title	Original release date
5	"Acquire the Fire"	July 23, 2025
6	"Consumed by the Call"	July 23, 2025
7	"BattleCry"	July 23, 2025

== Reception ==
Rich Juzwiak of Jezebel called the series "a damning portrait of a Christian organization that created a power structure leaving so many of its followers open to abuse, and a profile of exactly how that played out in one family." Adrian Horton of The Guardian wrote, "A show that is initially about an odd corner of American celebrity morphs into a recounting of abuse within the family, to abuse propagated and protected by IBLP, and to the inroads fundamentalist, authoritarian-leaning Christianity has made in US schools, government and civic life."
