= List of Counting On episodes =

Counting On (formerly Jill & Jessa: Counting On) is an American reality television show that aired on the cable channel TLC for 11 seasons from 2015 to 2020, with a final episode on March 20, 2021. A spin-off show of 19 Kids and Counting, it features the Duggar family's older children, Jill Dillard and Jessa Seewald, as they move on with their lives and raise their own families. The show was created in the wake of the Josh Duggar molestation scandal and subsequent cancellation of 19 Kids and Counting.

== Series overview ==
Season	Episodes	Originally released	
Season	Episodes	First released	Last released
1	3	December 13, 2015	December 27, 2015
2	8	March 15, 2016	May 3, 2016
3	13	August 23, 2016	November 15, 2016
4	7	January 16, 2017	February 27, 2017
5	8	June 12, 2017	July 24, 2017
6	7	September 11, 2017	October 23, 2017
7	7	February 26, 2018	March 26, 2018
8	11	July 30, 2018	October 1, 2018
9	7	February 11, 2019	March 25, 2019
10	10	October 15, 2019	December 17, 2019
11	12	July 7, 2020	September 22, 2020

== Episodes ==
=== Season 1 (2015) ===
No. overall	No. in season	Title	Original release date
1	1	"A New Chapter"	December 13, 2015
It was the happiest time in Jill's & Jessa's lives: a new baby, a new marriage, a new chapter of life. Then devastating news about older brother Josh was revealed & their worlds were shattered. Jill & Jessa share how their lives have changed forever.
2	2	"Baby Shower & A New Home"	December 20, 2015
Over the last few months Jill and Jessa grew even closer as sisters as they walked through this difficult time together. Now, just a couple of weeks away from Jessa's due date, Jill and Derick leave for their new lives in Central America.
3	3	"Counting One More"	December 27, 2015
Jill and Derick adjust to the challenges of their new life in Central America. Then it's finally time to meet Baby Seewald and find out if it's a boy or girl! When labor complications arise, Jessa is rushed to the hospital.

=== Season 2 (2016) ===
No. overall	No. in season	Title	Original release date
4	1	"At Home & Away"	March 15, 2016
Jessa & Ben navigate life as a family of 3 with new baby, Spurgeon. Jill & Derick settle into their home in Central America as Israel starts to hit new milestones. Later, Jessa enlists her sisters to help prepare a fall feast for the whole family.
5	2	"Date Nights & Bright Lights"	March 23, 2016
Jana and Jessa embark on a large DIY lighting project while the rest of the family travels to Central America. Then Jessa and Ben go on their first date since Spurgeon was born, will his presence wreck the romance?
6	3	"Jinger Flips"	March 29, 2016
Jessa goes out for coffee with Jana and Anna, leaving Ben in charge of Spurgeon. Jinger buys a car at auction with the intention of flipping while Jana starts a new project with her brothers. Jill and Derick introduce Israel to their love of pickles.
7	4	"Surprise!"	April 5, 2016
The siblings continue construction on their treehouse, which gets bigger and bigger. Joy and Sierra plan a secret baby shower, but worry about pulling off the surprise. Jill and Derick have surprise guests in Central America.
8	5	"Ben Drops Beats"	April 12, 2016
The siblings continue work on the family treehouse, but the cold weather hinders their efforts. Later, Ben & Jessa travel to St. Louis to meet with Christian hip-hop artist, Flame, and learn about his work. Inspired, Ben steps into the recording booth.
9	6	"Girls Hit the Road"	April 19, 2016
After weeks of work the treehouse is ready for a big reveal! The girls hit the road for a weekend away, but a surprise on the way leads to an unexpected detour. Once at their destination, the girls enjoy quality time together and lots of girl talk.
10	7	"Family Reunion"	April 26, 2016
Jessa, Ben & Spurgeon travel to Central America to visit Jill, Derick & Israel. As they prepare for the trip, they travel down memory lane, revisiting Jessa's milestone moments, from engagement to motherhood, that have led to this emotional reunion.
11	8	"Israel Meets Spurgeon"	May 3, 2016
Jessa & Ben experience what life is like for Jill & Derick while living in a foreign country with a young son. Jill and Derick remember their beginnings together in Nepal and the adventures that have led them to the mission field in Central America.

=== Season 3 (2016) ===
No. overall	No. in season	Title	Original release date
12	1	"A Courtship Begins"	August 23, 2016
On the season premiere of Counting On, Jessa and Ben discuss future additions to their growing family as Jill and Derick face hardships while continuing mission work in Central America. Jinger gets ready to take a big step with Jeremy.
13	2	"It's Official!"	August 30, 2016
Jinger brings Jeremy over for his first meal with the family. The couple makes a call to Jill & Derick for some courtship advice. Ben & Jessa discuss his plan for youth outreach. Later, the older siblings participate in wilderness survival training.
14	3	"Duggars in the Wild"	September 6, 2016
After a scary encounter with a nighttime visitor, the Duggar siblings continue their wilderness training. Jill & Derick celebrate their second anniversary with some creature comforts and Jessa and Ben marvel at how quickly their baby is growing up!
15	4	"Meet the Parents"	September 13, 2016
Jinger, accompanied by Jim Bob and Michelle, heads to Laredo, TX to meet Jeremy's parents for the first time. Will she meet with their approval? Meanwhile, back home, Joy gets her first flying lesson and Jana plans a graduation party for three siblings.
16	5	"A Big Surprise"	September 20, 2016
Jeremy makes a secret trip to Arkansas, but before surprising Jinger, he and Ben do some browsing for engagement rings. Then, Jessa and Ben give their rapper friend, Flame, a taste of Duggar family life.
17	6	"The Big Event"	September 27, 2016
Ben hosts a youth football camp with a group of former NFL players. Meanwhile, Jana hatches a plan to redecorate the guesthouse Jill and Derick will be staying in when they return from Central America. Jinger and Jeremy plan a special trip to NYC.
18	7	"Guys' Guide to Courting"	October 4, 2016
Jinger, Jeremy, and chaperones go on a whirlwind trip to see his family and friends. Will delayed flights ruin a big surprise Jeremy has planned? And we take a look back at past Duggar courtships and hear the guys' tips for a successful relationship.
19	8	"Proposal in the City"	October 11, 2016
Jinger, Michelle, Jessa, Ben and Spurgeon are all in the northeast meeting some of Jeremy's family & friends and visiting his old stomping grounds. Little does Jinger know, Jeremy has an important question he plans to ask before the trip is over!
20	9	"Jessa's Announcement"	October 18, 2016
Jinger & Jeremy celebrate their engagement in NYC. Meanwhile, Jill & Derick wrap up their mission work in Central America and are greeted with a big surprise party in Arkansas, but in the end, Jessa & Ben have an even bigger surprise of their own.
21	10	"The After Show"	October 25, 2016
The family comes together to relive some of the most memorable moments from season two. Plus, before the reunion is over, there is a surprise guest in store for the cast.
22	11	"Duggars at the Altar"	November 1, 2016
Take a look back at the Duggar daughter marriages! In two super-sized weddings, Jill and Jessa walked down the aisle just months apart. Relive each ceremony and first kiss!
23	12	"Courting Jinger"	November 8, 2016
The big day is almost here! Count down to Jinger's wedding with a look back at the special place she's held in the Duggar household.
24	13	"Jinger's Wedding"	November 15, 2016
After months of anticipation, Jinger and Jeremy's wedding day has finally arrived! Take a first look at this special day as Jinger walks down the aisle to become Mrs. Jeremy Vuolo.

=== Season 4 (2017) ===
No. overall	No. in season	Title	Original release date
25	1	"The Jinger Gown"	January 16, 2017
Jinger said yes to marrying Jeremy and now it's time to start planning for the big day, which is just 3 months away! The family takes a trip to DC to find Jinger's perfect dress but with more options than imagined, will she find her dream dress?
26	2	"Could it be Twins?"	January 23, 2017
Jessa and Ben listen to the heartbeat of baby #2, which makes them wonder if it's twins. They travel to see friend Flame in concert and Ben takes center stage. Jinger continues with wedding planning and finalizes important details.
27	3	"Bachelor Pad Makeover"	January 30, 2017
Jinger and some of her siblings travel to Laredo to give Jeremy's bachelor pad a makeover. When opinions clash, will they be able to come to a decorating decision? Derick, Jill and Israel get some surprising news at their family wellness check-up.
28	4	"The Bachelor Party"	February 6, 2017
After weeks of wedding planning, it's time to celebrate Jinger and Jeremy with a Bachelor and Bachelorette weekend full of friends and family. Jessa and Ben find out the gender of baby #2. Derick returns to OSU to reprise his role as Pistol Pete.
29	5	"All About Jinger"	February 13, 2017
Jinger packs for her move to Texas, which includes a surprise gift from her family. She, Jeremy & Jedidiah drive to her future home in Laredo. As they anticipate her big move, the siblings take a trip down memory lane remembering Jinger through the years.
30	6	"The Big Day"	February 20, 2017
After months of planning, Jinger's wedding day is here! The final details from dress fittings to surprise decorations are put into place and family and friends come together to celebrate Jinger and Jeremy as they become Mr. and Mrs. Vuolo.
31	7	"A Honeymoon & a Courtship"	February 27, 2017
Jinger and Jeremy have said "I do" and now the newlyweds finally get to enjoy some alone time. Mr. and Mrs. Vuolo head Down Under for their honeymoon in Australia. Meanwhile, back in Arkansas, another Duggar enters a courtship.

=== Season 5 (2017) ===
No. overall	No. in season	Title	Original release date
32	1	"Joy's Wedding"	June 12, 2017
In the season premiere, Joy and Austin's wedding day finally arrives and another Duggar reveals a surprise that leaves the guests in shock.
33	2	"Spurgeon's First Birthday"	June 19, 2017
Spurgeon's first birthday brings the family together for a celebration. Meanwhile, Joy and Austin work on a house-flipping project and in Laredo, things heat up in the kitchen with Jinger and Jeremy.
34	3	"Triple Date Night"	June 12, 2017
Ben, Derick and Austin enjoy an afternoon at a trampoline park while Jessa, Jill and Joy shop for the perfect date night outfit. Jill and Derick share some big news with Israel. Meanwhile in Laredo, Jinger and Jeremy settle into married life.
35	4	"A New Baby"	June 26, 2017
Jessa's due date is near, so family and friends help the Seewalds prepare for the new baby. Meanwhile, Joy and Austin's house-flipping project continues; and Austin asks Jim Bob an important question.
36	5	"A Boy or Girl for Jill?"	July 3, 2017
The Seewalds are adjusting to being a family of four. In Laredo, Jinger and Jeremy learn Spanish and test their skills at a local restaurant. Meanwhile, Joy enjoys dinner with Austin's family. Then the Dillards reveal the gender of baby number two!
37	6	"Joy Gets Engaged"	July 10, 2017
The Dillards prepare for their return to Central America; Jinger puts together a care package for her family back in Arkansas; Austin asks Joy a very important question; Joe asks for permission to enter courtship with Kendra Caldwell.
38	7	"The After Show Part 1"	July 17, 2017
In part one of the two-part after-show special, host Daphne Oz digs a little deeper into some of last season's biggest moments; including courtships, weddings, babies, and some insight on what is going on behind the scenes.
39	8	"The After Show Part 2"	July 24, 2017
In part two of the two-part After Show special, host Daphne Oz gets the Duggars' reaction to some of the biggest moments of last season, and the happy couples square off in a round of "The Couples Showdown". Stay tuned for a special guest or two!

=== Season 6 (2017) ===
No. overall	No. in season	Title	Original release date
40	1	"A New Courtship"	September 11, 2017
The Seewalds and Vuolos meet up in San Antonio and take a stroll down memory lane. Joy begins her wedding planning with a walk through the venue. The Dillards get settled in Central America and Joe asks Kendra an important question.
41	2	"Let Them Eat Cake"	September 18, 2017
Wedding planning continues, as Joy tastes cake with Austin and shops for bridesmaid dresses. Joe and Kendra enjoy a rollerblading date. The Vuolos take a cooking class together in Laredo and renovations begin on Joy and Austin's house.
42	3	"Finding Joy's Dress"	September 25, 2017
Joy travels to Kentucky to find her perfect wedding dress, but with so many options, the overwhelmed bride has to make some big decisions. Austin and Joe enjoy some bonding time with their future father-in-laws. Israel celebrates his second birthday!
43	4	"Joy and Austin's Camping Trip"	October 2, 2017
Joy and Kendra visit a salon to get some hairstyle ideas for Joy's wedding. Joy and Austin celebrate their bachelor & bachelorette weekend with a fun camping trip. Jinger and Jeremy do some shopping for Joy and Austin's rehearsal dinner.
44	5	"Tomboy Joy"	October 9, 2017
Joy and Austin's wedding day is almost here, so Joy's siblings prepare some special gifts for the happy couple and take a trip down memory lane remembering Joy through the years.
45 (Note: Two-hour special.)	6	"Joy and Austin Tie the Knot"	October 16, 2017
Joy's wedding day is finally here! After months of planning, the final touches are added as family and friends come together to celebrate Joy & Austin becoming Mr. & Mrs Forsyth.
46	7	"Joseph's Wedding"	October 23, 2017
The day has finally arrived for Joe and Kendra to get married! From emotional moments leading up to their vows, to the couple of surprises during the ceremony. Joe and Kendra's wedding day will be one that their guests won't soon forget.

=== Season 7 (2018) ===
No. overall	No. in season	Title	Original release date
47	1	"In Love In Switzerland"	February 26, 2018
Joy and Austin have said "I do," and now Mr. and Mrs. Forsyth finally get to enjoy some alone time in Switzerland. Jinger and Jeremy try their hand at playing tennis. Joe and Kendra get their engagement photos taken.
48	2	"The Vuolos Buy a House"	February 26, 2018
The siblings help Jinger and Jeremy move out of their apartment and into their new house. Joe and Kendra enjoy playing disc golf with the Caldwells. Joy and Austin settle into married life and help out at Fort Rock Family Camp.
49	3	"Spurgeon's First Haircut"	March 5, 2018
Jeremy and Jinger continue to put their stamp on their new home. Joe and Kendra pick out the groomsmen's outfits. Jessa and Ben finally give Spurgeon a haircut, while Joy and Austin try to make the most of their less-than-ideal living situation.
50	4	"Kendra's Birthday Surprise"	March 12, 2018
Jinger and Jeremy play host to their friends from NYC; on Kendra's birthday, she heads to Kentucky to pick out her wedding dress, but Joe has a big birthday surprise up his sleeve.
51	5	"A New Bundle of Joy"	March 19, 2018
Joe and Kendra have a joint bachelor/bachelorette party on a lake with family and friends; Jinger and Jeremy decide to take a shot at coffee roasting; Joy and Austin have some big news to share with the family.
52	6	"Joy gives Birth"	March 19, 2018
In this first look, Joy prepares to welcome her first child as her due date approaches. With Austin by her side, Joy goes into labor, but ends up at the hospital, where she gives birth to their baby!
53	7	"Joe and Kendra Say I Do"	March 26, 2018
The time has finally come for Joe and Kendra to say I do! there are emotional moments with family and friends as they prepare for their wedding day; when the ceremony begins, a few surprises and mishaps make sure it's a day they won't forget!

=== Season 8 (2018) ===
No. overall	No. in season	Title	Original release date
54	1	"It's All Greek To Me!"	July 30, 2018
Seems like someone has caught Josiah's eye! Josiah asks Lauren Swanson to enter into a courtship, but will she say yes? Meanwhile, Joe & Kendra go on their Greek honeymoon filled with a thrilling lunch in the sky, a local food tour & paddleboarding.
55	2	"Make Room For Baby"	August 6, 2018
Joy and Austin check in on Baby Forsyth at their midwife appointment. In Laredo, Jinger and Jeremy go window shopping for a new piano. Joe and Kendra move into their new home and have a special reveal for the family.
56	3	"Unexpected"	August 6, 2018
Newly-expectant parents Joe & Kendra check up on their baby. The little girls record an album in Nashville. Josiah takes Lauren's siblings out for ice cream. While visiting Jeremy's parents at a charity gala, he & Jinger reveal some unexpected news.
57	4	"Jinger and Jeremy's Little Secret"	August 13, 2018
Jessa and Ben visit a creamery with the kids. Joy and Austin go on a babymoon before their baby arrives. Jinger and Jeremy are in Arkansas and have a special announcement for the family.
58	5	"An Explosive Reveal"	August 20, 2018
Jinger and Jeremy celebrate their first anniversary and Jeremy has a very special surprise for her. Josiah is ready to take the next step; will Lauren's dad give his blessing? Later, Joe and Kendra reveal the gender of their baby in a very explosive way.
59	6	"Josiah Pops the Question"	August 27, 2018
Jinger and Jeremy's good friends come for a visit and the expecting couple has a trial run at parenthood. Will they be able to manage three kids under five without any meltdowns? Later, Josiah travels to Georgia to propose to Lauren. Will she say yes?
60	7	"A Birth-day and a Birthday"	September 3, 2018
The three pregnant sisters are reunited for a big family birthday. Later, Joy goes into labor and after 20 hours, she is transported to the hospital for an emergency C-section. How will Joy and Austin handle this scary change of plans?
61	8	"Thrift Store Date Night"	September 10, 2018
Three couples go on a thrift store date night and choose outfits for theirs partners to wear. With a small budget and a big sense of humor, will someone end up with fashion faux pas? Then, new mom Joy and pregnant Kendra have joint Sip & See party.
62	9	"Lauren Finds Her Dress"	September 17, 2018
The Duggars celebrate Jana and John David's 28th birthday with a family ski trip. Meanwhile, Jinger and Jeremy tour a birth center and find out the gender of their baby. Later, Lauren goes shopping for the perfect wedding gown. Will she find "the one"?
63	10	"Jinger's Double Surprise"	September 24, 2018
Jinger and Jeremy throw a gender reveal party for the family and the family has a surprise of their own for Jinger. Josiah and Lauren celebrate their upcoming wedding with a game of giant foosball. Joe and Kendra welcome their baby boy!
64	11	"Josiah and Lauren’s Prank-Less Wedding?"	October 1, 2018
It’s Josiah and Lauren’s wedding day. The happy couple is eager to walk down the aisle and finally share their first kiss. With Josiah being the family prankster and the brothers out for revenge, is the couple prepared for some shenanigans?
65	12	"John-David's Wedding"	November 27, 2018
John-David and Abbie go back to where their love story began as they get married in Ada, Oklahoma, in front of 1,000 of their closest family and friends.

=== Season 9 (2019) ===
No. overall	No. in season	Title	Original release date
66	1	"Love is in the Air"	February 11, 2019
With the due date near, Jinger and Jeremy get ready to meet baby Vuolo; John whisks Abbie away on a surprise trip to ask for her hand in marriage. Jinger's labor takes an unexpected turn.
67	2	"Jinger Has a Baby"	February 18, 2019
The hills are alive for Josiah and Lauren as they go on their Austrian honeymoon; while there, they re-enact scenes from The Sound of Music and visit with a local family; Jinger worries she won't have the smooth labor she was hoping for.
68	3	"Sleepless in Laredo"	February 25, 2019
Jinger and Jeremy get a dose of reality as they adjust to life as new parents; Ben tutors the Duggar kids and they must use their math skills to cook a meal for 40 people. Later at dinner, one couple makes a special announcement.
69	4	"Love and Loss"	March 4, 2019
Jessa, Lauren, Kendra and Jana pair off with some of the little kids and go head to head to create a groom's cake for John and Abbie's wedding. Josiah and Lauren's worlds are shaken up when they reveal some tragic news.
70	5	"The Abbie Gown"	March 11, 2019
In Laredo, Jeremy is on daddy duty as Jinger runs errands; John and Abbie's wedding is just around the corner; John and the boys partake in a thrilling competition while Abbie tries on wedding dresses.
71	6	"To Grandmother's House We Go"	March 18, 2019
John David and Abbie fly to the Philippines for a mission trip weeks before their wedding; Jinger and Jeremy travel up north so Felicity can meet her great-grandparents; while there, they get a surprise from some very unexpected guests.
72	7	"A Bachelor No More"	March 25, 2019
John and Abbie's wedding is finally here and everyone is in full wedding-mode as they get ready for the big day; at the altar, the bride and groom share their first kiss in an unexpected way; a family member has a very special announcement.

=== Season 10 (2019) ===
No. overall	No. in season	Title	Original release date
75	1	"Who's the Most Romantic?"	October 15, 2019
Jinger and Jeremy go to a conference in L.A. Back in Arkansas, some of the married couples have a date night competition.
76	2	"The Vuolos Take L.A."	October 22, 2019
Jinger and Jeremy explore L.A. with new friends. While hiking, Jinger discusses her decision to wear pants, which is unusual for Duggar women. The Duggar boys' road trip could be the last time they're all together before one of them starts a new courtship.
77	3	"Count Your Blessings"	October 29, 2019
John and Abbie finish their winter honeymoon in Finland. Jinger flies to Arkansas after Grandma Duggar's health declines. Meanwhile, Lauren opens up about her struggles with grief and depression.
78	4	"Kendra's Got a Secret"	November 5, 2019
Kendra surprises Joe when she finds out she's expecting baby #2; Jessa recruits her brothers to build a deck for her house before the new baby's arrival.
79	5	"The Great Duggar Campout"	November 12, 2019
Jinger and Jeremy go house-hunting in Los Angeles; the family goes camping in Arkansas; one couple makes a special announcement.
80	6	"Baby Number Two... but Who?"	November 19, 2019
Joe and Kendra visit Jinger and Jeremy in Texas, where they sample some creepy, crawly appetizers. Jessa seeks help from a speech therapist as Henry struggles to learn new words. Joy and Austin surprise the family by announcing that they are expecting baby number two.
81	7	"Marriage Bootcamp"	November 26, 2019
Jinger and Jeremy decide to hold a yard sale before their big move to LA. They must put their haggling skills to work and try to sell as much as they can. Meanwhile, the married couples attend a marriage retreat where they focus on their relationships
82	8	"Five Pregnancies and Counting"	December 3, 2019
Five Duggars are pregnant! The ladies attend a garden party to celebrate. Ben & Jessa take a trip down memory lane five years after their engagement. Josiah & Lauren are concerned when their gender reveal balloon floats away.
83	9	"A Surprise Delivery"	December 10, 2019
Jessa goes into labor two weeks before her due date and after the birth, they are faced with an emergency situation. Joe and Kendra find out the gender of their second baby at Garret's first birthday, with his smash cake.
84	10	"Grandma Duggar Remembered"	December 17, 2019
The four pregnant Duggar girls and Lauren have a maternity photoshoot and a surprise guest reveals she's also expecting. Jinger and Jeremy prepare for their big move to L.A. but tragedy strikes when they get devastating news from back home.

=== Season 11 (2020) ===
No. overall	No. in season	Title	Original release date
85	1	"La La Land"	July 7, 2020
Jinger and Jeremy prepare to start their new lives in LA and take a road trip across the country to get there. Meanwhile, in Arkansas, Joy and Austin grieve the loss of their baby girl. Later, John and Abbie reveal their baby's gender in a big way!
86	2	"Beverly Hills Duggars"	July 14, 2020
Jana and Jinger hit up Beverly Hills for some shopping but quickly get some sticker shock when Jinger falls in love with a pricey jacket. In Arkansas, the girls enjoy a mom's day in. They dig deep as they answer questions about pregnancy and motherhood.
87	3	"A Duggar Bachelor Pad"	July 21, 2020
Jessa and Ben go on their first road trip with three kids, to visit friends in Kansas City. Some of the Duggars go to the Bahamas to help after a hurricane. Jedidiah and Jeremiah show off their bachelor pad. The family competes in a corn maze race.
89	4	"The Duggar Dash"	July 28, 2020
It's hard to decide which Duggar is the most competitive, so they decide to put it to a test. The family splits into four teams and Michelle sends them on an exciting race around town.
90	5	"A Baby Girl for Joe & Kendra"	August 4, 2020
Jeremy takes a skateboarding lesson, will he learn to shred or play it safe? Later, Kendra goes into labor. As contractions intensify quickly, her birth team worries that her doctor might not arrive in time.
91	6	"A Beautiful Miracle"	August 11, 2020
Lauren goes into labor eleven days before her due date. After a long and painful labor, she and Josiah finally meet their rainbow baby. Jinger & Jeremy join family fun night in Arkansas via video chat where they share a special surprise.
92	7	"Highs and Lows"	August 18, 2020
Jinger and Jeremy share the sad news that they have miscarried their baby. In Arkansas, Ben has second thoughts as he undergoes eye surgery. Later, Jeremy throws Jinger a surprise party filled with some unexpected guests and a special gift.
93	8	"The Best Duggar Christmas Pageant Ever"	August 25, 2020
Jana and Jessa organize a Christmas pageant, and the whole family helps.
94	9	"Meet Gracie Duggar"	September 1, 2020
John David goes from "bachelor till the rapture" to dad!
95	10	"From Snow to Sand"	September 8, 2020
Jinger and Jeremy take advantage of all California has to offer when they take friends on a snow to sand adventure. Back in Arkansas, the guys throw John a Dad-chelor party to welcome him to fatherhood. Then, Joy and Austin share exciting news.
96	11	"Jana's Secret Garden"	September 15, 2020
The family surprises Jana with something she's wanted for a long time.
97	12	"A Quarantine Courtship"	September 22, 2020
The Duggars adjust to a new normal during the pandemic as they get creative celebrating Abbie's birthday from a distance. Jinger and Jeremy take over a family video chat to share happy news. Surprises keep coming when Justin announces a courtship.
