= Vuolo =

Vuolo is a surname, and may refer to:

- Jeremy Vuolo (born 1987), American soccer player
- Jinger Vuolo (born 1993), American television personality
- Lindsey Vuolo (born 1981), American model
- Tito Vuolo (1893–1962), Italian-American actor
