= Jill Dillard =

American television personality (born 1991)

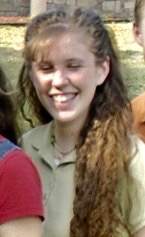
- Dillard in 2007
- Born: Jill Michelle Duggar; May 17, 1991 (age 35); Tontitown, Arkansas, U.S.
- Occupation: Television personality
- Years active: 2004–2017
- Spouse: Derick Dillard (m. 2014)
- Children: 4
- Father: Jim Bob Duggar
- Relatives: Josh Duggar (brother); Jana Wissmann (sister); Jessa Seewald (sister); Jinger Vuolo (sister); Joseph Duggar (brother)
- Website: www.dillardfamily.com

Jill Michelle Dillard (née Duggar; born May 17, 1991) is an American author and former television personality. She is known for her appearances on TLC as part of the reality television shows 19 Kids and Counting (2008–2015) and Counting On (2015–2021), and in the 2023 Amazon Prime documentary Shiny Happy People, about her upbringing within Bill Gothard's financially and sexually exploitative Institute in Basic Life Principles (IBLP) and Advanced Training Institute (ATI) organizations, for which her parents were important proselytizers. As Jill Duggar, she also co-authored a book with her sisters Jana, Jessa, and Jinger titled Growing Up Duggar: It's All About Relationships. Her second book, Counting the Cost, was released in September 2023.

== Personal life ==
Dillard was born in Tontitown, Arkansas, as the fourth child and the second daughter of Jim Bob and Michelle Duggar. On June 21, 2014, she married Derick Michael Dillard. They have three sons together. In 2015, the Dillard family relocated to El Salvador to serve as missionaries with S.O.S. Ministries. Ten months later, they returned to the United States. In 2021, Dillard had a miscarriage, followed by the birth of a stillborn daughter in 2024.

== Career ==
=== Television ===
Dillard began her public life as a member of the family featured in the documentary 14 Children and Pregnant Again (2004), which talks about daily life of the family from the "time they wake up" to the "time they go to sleep". The documentary aired on the Discovery Health Channel. Another documentary, Raising 16 Children was produced on the same channel in 2006, when her sister Johannah was born. This was followed by another feature, On the Road with 16 Children about a family cross-country trip.

On September 29, 2008, 19 Kids and Counting (formerly 18 Kids and Counting and 17 Kids and Counting) began as a regular series based on the Duggar family. The show was cancelled in 2015 following several scandals surrounding her brother Josh. Another series, Jill & Jessa: Counting On, starring Dillard and her sister Jessa, premiered on December 13, 2015. Jill and her family dropped out of the show in 2017.

=== Books ===
Dillard co-wrote the book Growing Up Duggar: It's All About Relationships, published by Howard Books with her sisters Jana, Jessa and Jinger. It was released on March 4, 2014. Her second book, Counting the Cost, was released on September 12, 2023.

=== Midwife ===
In 2015, Dillard became a Certified Professional Midwife (CPM) in Arkansas. However, her mentor Vanessa Giron's license was revoked after being found negligent in a birth. Neither Dillard nor Giron are licensed midwives in the state of Arkansas.

== Sexual abuse survivor ==
In June 2015 on The Kelly File, Dillard identified herself as one of the girls whom her oldest brother Joshua Duggar had molested as a teen. Dillard reported the abuse consisted of inappropriate touching while she was asleep, saying she did not know it had occurred until her brother confessed to her parents, and her parents then told her what had occurred. Dillard stated that the release of the police reports was a "revictimization", and she expressed concern that the police reports detailing her abuse being made public might discourage other families experiencing abuse from seeking help. Dillard later stated that she regretted doing the interview with Megyn Kelly but that she had felt obligated.

In 2017, Jill and her sister Jessa sued Springdale and Washington County officials for releasing the police reports. In February 2022, the judge dismissed the case, saying that the officials had broken the law merely out of negligence rather than intention and thus had immunity.
