= Jim Bob Duggar =

American politician and reality television personality (born 1965)

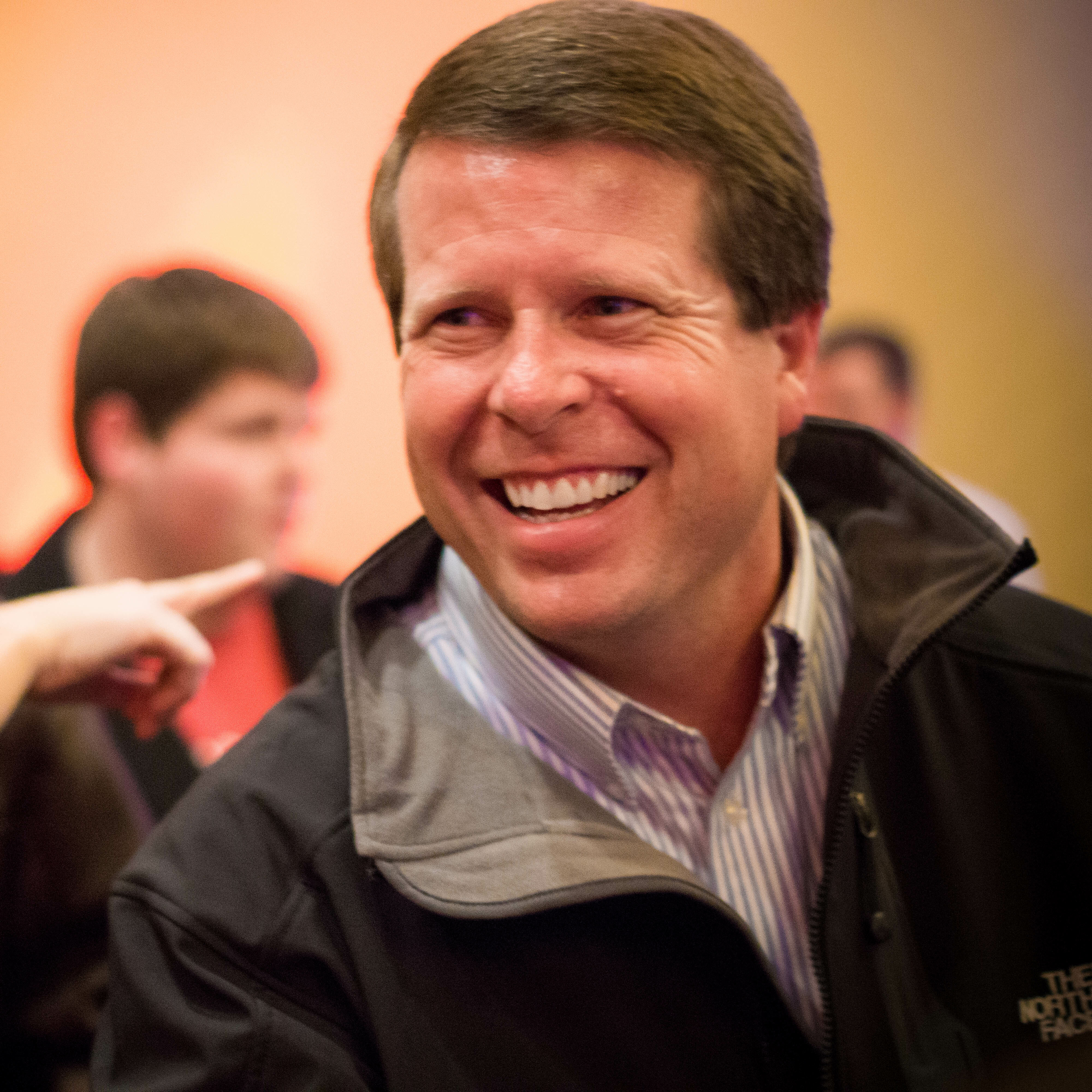
- Duggar in 2012

Member of the Arkansas House of Representatives from the 6th district
- In office January 11, 1999 – January 13, 2003
- Preceded by: Louis McJunkin
- Succeeded by: Jodie Mahony

Personal details
- Born: James Robert Duggar; July 18, 1965 (age 61) Springdale, Arkansas, U.S.
- Party: Republican
- Spouse: Michelle Ruark (m. 1984)
- Children: 19, including Josh, Jana, Jill, Jessa, Jinger, and Joseph
- Occupation: Realtor; businessman; investor; television personality; author
- Website: duggarfamily.com

James Robert "Jim Bob" Duggar (born July 18, 1965) is an American politician and television personality. He appeared on the reality series 19 Kids and Counting, which aired from 2008 to 2015. From 1999 to 2003, he was a Republican member of the Arkansas House of Representatives.

By 2026, it was acknowledged that he knew about some reports of alleged acts of sex abuse committed by his son Josh, with an Arkansas state trooper also assisting Jim Bob and Josh by taking no further action after they reported incidents of sex abuse in 2006.

== Early life ==
Duggar was born in Springdale, now the fourth largest city in Arkansas. His parents, James Lee "Jimmy Lee" Duggar (1936–2009) and Mary Leona Duggar (née Lester; 1941–2019), owned a real estate brokerage agency. He graduated from Shiloh Christian School.

== Career ==
Duggar is a licensed realtor and owns several commercial properties in his local area as an investor.

== Political career ==
From 1999 to 2003, Duggar served in the Arkansas House of Representatives for District 6, which was located in northern Washington County. He first won election in 1998, defeating Kathy McFetridge with 56% of the vote. He was re-elected by a wider margin in 2000. Duggar was vice chair of the House Corrections and Criminal Law Subcommittee and also participated in the committees on Insurance and Commerce and Judiciary.

In 2002, rather than seeking reelection to the state House, Duggar ran unsuccessfully in the Republican primary election for the United States Senate. He was defeated by the incumbent Senator Tim Hutchinson by a lopsided vote of 71,576 to 20,546. In 2006, Duggar unsuccessfully sought the Republican nomination for the District 35 seat in the Arkansas State Senate. He lost to his opponent, Bill Pritchard, by two hundred votes.

In 2021, Duggar announced his second candidacy for the State Senate, now running in the 7th District. The election was triggered after the incumbent Republican, Lance Eads, resigned. Duggar finished third out of four candidates in the Republican primary, with 15.3% of the vote.

== Marriage and children ==
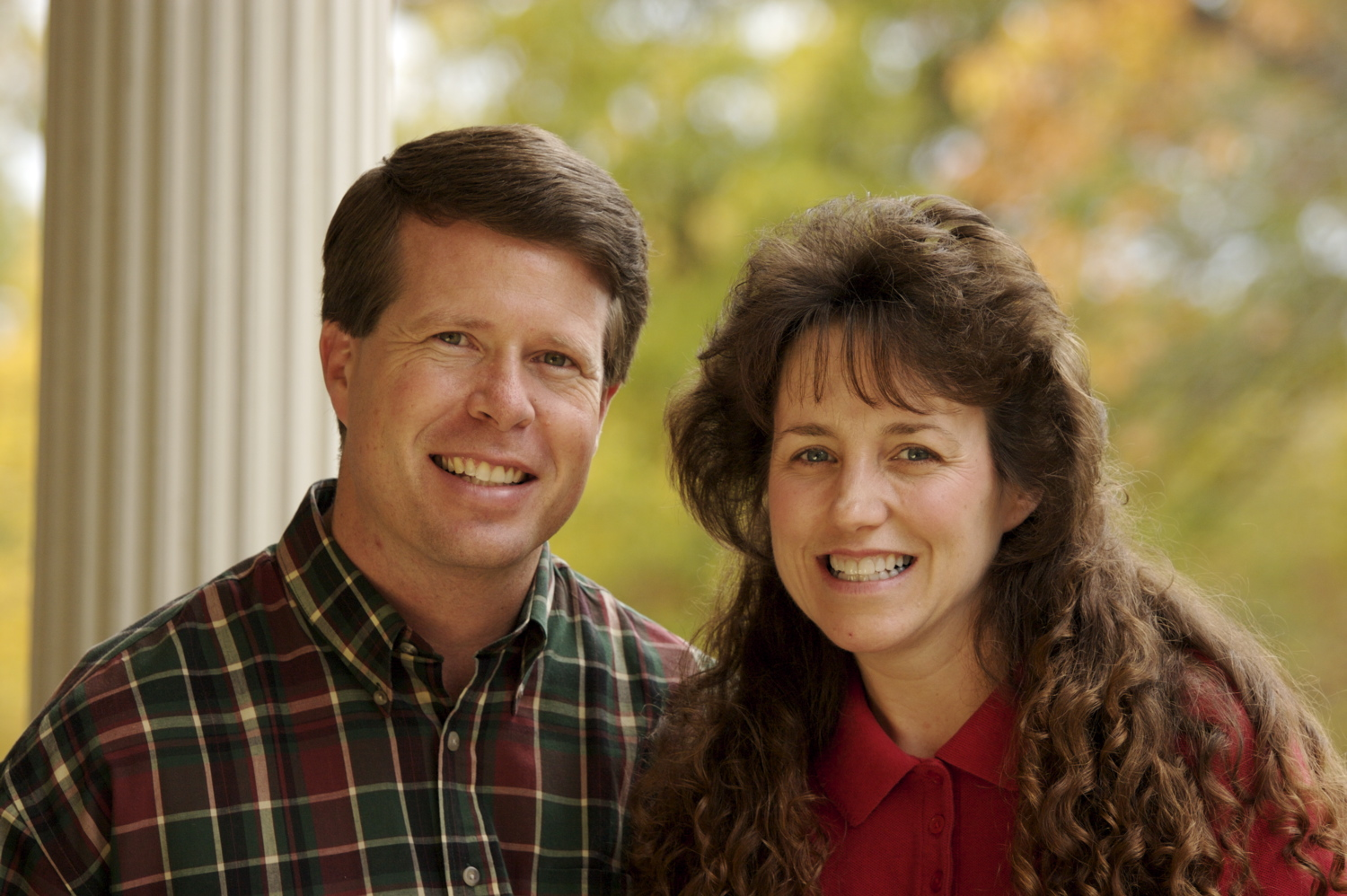
Jim Bob and Michelle Duggar in 2006

On July 21, 1984, Duggar married Michelle Annette Ruark. Together, the couple has 19 children: Joshua ("Josh") (b. 1988), twins Jana and John-David (b. 1990), Jill (b. 1991), Jessa (b. 1992), Jinger (b. 1993), Joseph (b. 1995), Josiah (b. 1996), Joy-Anna (b. 1997), twins Jedidiah and Jeremiah (b. 1998), Jason (b. 2000), James (b. 2001), Justin (b. 2002), Jackson (b. 2004), Johannah (b. 2005), Jennifer (b. 2007), Jordyn (b. 2008), and Josie (b. 2009). Duggar and his wife also have had permanent guardianship of his wife's great-nephew Tyler Hutchins (b. 2008), since November 2016. The family was featured on the reality series 19 Kids and Counting from 2008 to 2015.

Duggar and his family are Independent Baptist Christians. They are members of the Institute in Basic Life Principles organization (aka IBLP and Advanced Training Institute), a homeschooling program run by Christian minister Bill Gothard. Duggar's oldest daughter, Jana Wissman, was formerly a leader at the IBLP's "Journey to the Heart" youth ministry.

By March 2026, two of Duggar's children, Josh and Joseph, had received sex abuse related charges for crimes against minors, with Josh being convicted in 2021.

=== Josh Duggar molestation report and cover up allegation ===
In 2006, Jim Bob Duggar told the Arkansas State Police that his oldest son, Josh, had molested five underage girls, including family members, in the early 2000s when he was 14–15 years old. The alleged abuse involved touching their breast and genital regions on multiple occasions while they slept and in a few cases while they were awake. Jim Bob Duggar had been prompted to speak to police after producers of The Oprah Winfrey Show told authorities they had received allegations against Josh Duggar. Jim Bob and Michelle Duggar told police they had sent Josh away for several months in 2003 and that, upon his return home, Jim Bob had taken him to Arkansas State Trooper Jim Hutchens, a family acquaintance, for a "stern talk". Because of this 2003 contact with police, the three-year statute of limitations had expired by the time of the December 2006 police investigation, and Josh Duggar was not formally charged with any crime.

The public did not learn about this until 2015, when Josh Duggar's public admission of his behavior caused TLC to cancel the reality show 19 Kids and Counting. In a joint statement to People magazine following the public revelation, Jim Bob and Michelle Duggar said: "Even though we would never choose to go through something so terrible, each one of our family members drew closer to God. We pray that as people watch our lives they see that we are not a perfect family. We have challenges and struggles every day."

TLC rebooted the Duggar's reality show as Counting On later in 2015, focusing on the older Duggar children and their spouses and children. This show, too, was canceled in 2021 after Josh Duggar was arrested. On December 9, 2021, Josh Duggar was convicted of receiving and possessing child pornography.

Joseph Hutchens, the Arkansas state trooper who the sex abuse was reported to in 2006 and who assisted Josh and Jim Bob Duggar by not taking further action, would later be given a 56-year prison sentence for his own child pornography charges. Hutchens later alleged that the Duggar family made an effort to conceal the extent of Josh's sex abuse.

=== Joseph Duggar molestation arrest ===
On March 18, 2026, Joseph Duggar was arrested and charged with several counts of unlawful sexual activity with a minor. The charges relate to an incident in 2020 when he allegedly molested an unnamed girl, then nine years old. He was released on $600,000 bond. His wife, Kendra Duggar, was arrested and charged with multiple counts of endangering the welfare of a minor and with false imprisonment on March 20, 2026.

== Books ==
Duggar and his wife have written two books together, both published by Howard Books. The first is titled The Duggars: 20 and Counting!, which was released on December 2, 2008. Their second is A Love That Multiplies, which was released June 7, 2011.

== Other political activities ==
In 2008, Duggar and his wife endorsed former Governor Mike Huckabee in his campaign for the Republican presidential primaries. In January 2012, the Duggars endorsed Republican former U.S. Senator Rick Santorum of Pennsylvania for president.

== Electoral history ==
1998 Arkansas State House of Representatives 6th district election
Party	Candidate	Votes	%
Republican	Jim Bob Duggar	4,211	56.03%
Democratic	Kathy McFetridge	3,304	43.97%
Total votes		7,515	100.0%

2000 Arkansas State House of Representatives 6th district election
Party	Candidate	Votes	%
Republican	Jim Bob Duggar	5,848	62.42%
Democratic	Kathy McFetridge	3,180	33.94%
Independent	Allen Kitterman	341	3.64%
Total votes		9,369	100.0%

2002 Arkansas U.S. Senate Republican primary
Party	Candidate	Votes	%
Republican	Tim Hutchinson	71,576	77.7%
Republican	Jim Bob Duggar	20,546	22.3%
Total votes		92,116	100.0%

2006 Arkansas State Senate 35th district Republican primary
Party	Candidate	Votes	%
Republican	Bill Pritchard	1,812	52.55%
Republican	Jim Bob Duggar	1,636	47.55%
Total votes		3,448	100.0%

2021 Arkansas State Senate 7th district special election Republican primary
Party	Candidate	Votes	%
Republican	Colby Fulfer	1,388	46.7
Republican	Steve Unger	943	31.7
Republican	Jim Bob Duggar	456	15.3
Republican	Edge Nowlin	188	6.3
Total votes		2,975	100.0

== See also ==
- The Bates Family
