= Federal Correctional Institution, Elkton =

Low-security prison in Ohio, US

Coordinates: 40°46′21″N 80°42′17″W

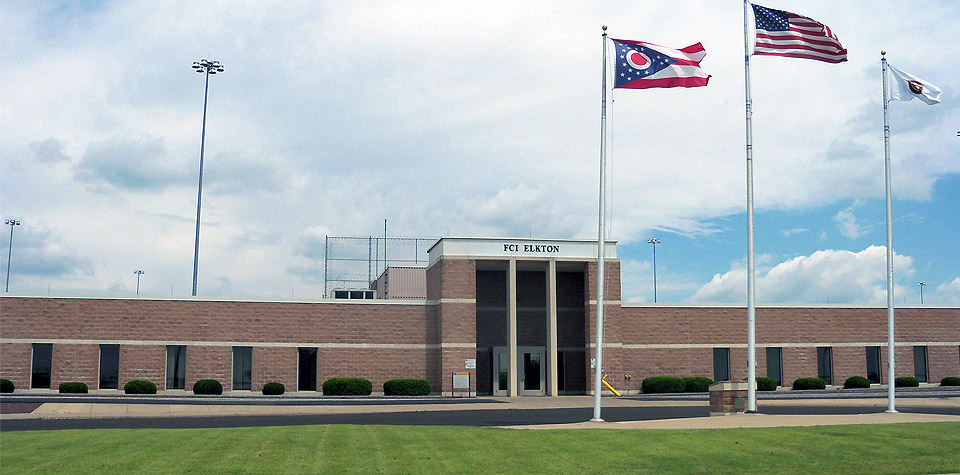
- Interactive map of Federal Correctional Institution, Elkton
- Location: Elkrun Township, Ohio, U.S.
- Status: Operational
- Security class: Low-security (with minimum-security prison camp)
- Population: 2,088 (483 in prison camp)
- Opened: 1997
- Managed by: Federal Bureau of Prisons

The Federal Correctional Institution, Elkton (FCI Elkton) is a low-security United States federal prison for male inmates in Elkrun Township, Ohio. It is operated by the Federal Bureau of Prisons, a division of the United States Department of Justice. It also has an adjacent satellite prison camp that houses low and minimum-security male inmates. FCI Elkton opened in 1997 and is located near Elkton in central Columbiana County, 45 miles (72 km) northwest of Pittsburgh.

== Notable incidents ==
In 2010, a federal grand jury in Cleveland, Ohio, charged FCI Elkton inmate William J. Platz, age 61, with drawing and distributing visual depictions of minors engaged in sexually explicit conduct to another inmate between August 2007 and April 2008. Platz was already serving an 11-year sentence for a child pornography conviction in 2000 and was a co-conspirator with Eric Rosser. Rosser was an FBI Ten Most Wanted Fugitive until his capture in 2001. Platz subsequently pleaded guilty and was sentenced to additional prison time, which he served at the Federal Correctional Institution, Seagoville, a low-security facility in Texas. He was released in 2016.

== Notable inmates (current and former) ==
Names	Register Number	Photo	Status	Details
Fetty Wap	71943-509		Served a 72 month sentence. Released on January 8, 2026.	American rapper and singer; Charged with Conspiracy to distribute and possess controlled substances
Larry Householder	79002-061		Serving a 20 year sentence. Scheduled for release in 2040.	Convicted on racketeering charges for his involvement in the Ohio nuclear bribery scandal.
J. Alexander Kueng	43977-509		Sentenced to 3 years. Released in January, 2025.	Former police officer convicted in the Murder of George Floyd.
Zachariah Fredrickson	06328-122		Sentenced to 10 years. Scheduled for release in 2027.	Sentenced to 10 years for attempting to entice a 13 year-old minor to engage in unlawful sexual activity.
Peter Gotti	99109-012		Served 17 years of a 25-year sentence; died on February 25, 2021.	Boss of the Gambino crime family in New York City after his brother John Gotti's death in 2002; convicted in 2004 of extorting money from contractors and conspiring to murder Sammy Gravano, who testified against John Gotti during his 1992 trial.
Floyd Lee Corkins	32193-016		Serving a 25-year sentence; scheduled for release in 2033.	Pleaded guilty in 2013 to a terrorism charge for shooting a security guard at the Washington, DC headquarters of the conservative lobbying group Family Research Council in August 2012 in retaliation for the group's opposition to gay marriage.
Quando Rondo	90880-510		Serving a 2 years and 9 months sentence	Violating Federal drug laws.
George Nader	17310-083		Served a 10-year sentence; released in 2025	Lebanese-born political adviser who worked as an unofficial diplomat between American and Middle-Eastern countries. Convicted on child pornography and human trafficking charges.
Glenn Shriver	44634-039		Released from custody in 2013; served 4 years.	American citizen; pleaded guilty in 2010 to attempting to obtain a position with the Central Intelligence Agency in order to access classified national defense information and transmit it to intelligence officers of the People’s Republic of China.
Samuel Mullet Sr.	57560-060		Served an 11-year sentence; released on January 15, 2021.	Leader of an ultraconservative Amish sect; convicted in 2012 of hate crime conspiracy for masterminding home invasions and forcible beard cuttings in an attempt to shame mainstream members of the Amish community.
Joseph Vas	30003-050		Served a 6-year sentence; released on February 24, 2017.	Boss and political powerhouse in Perth Amboy, NJ for over 20 years. Indicted on corruption and a variety of other charges.
Jimmy Dimora	56275-060		Serving 28 year sentence. Now located at RRM Cincinnati; scheduled for release in 2030.	Cuyahoga County commissioner, convicted of racketeering, tax fraud, bribery, extortion, and conspiracy.
Billy McFarland	91186-054		Served 6 year sentence, released on August 30, 2022.	Sentenced to 6 years in October 2018 after pleading guilty to two counts of wire fraud amounting to more than $26 million that occurred during his promotion of the fraudulent Fyre Festival music festival.
Scott Tyree	45380-083		Released from custody on September 22, 2021; served a 19 year and 7 month sentence.	Kidnapper of Alicia Kozakiewicz.
Alan Li	07507-506		Serving a 10-year sentence with a scheduled release in 2030, followed by 10 years of supervised release.	Li was a resident emergency medicine physician at Mount Sinai Medical Center when he was arrested and charged by the FBI in May 2022 for attempted child sex trafficking.
John Musbach	73783-050		Serving a 6.5 year sentence with 3 years supervised release, scheduled release 9/29/25.	John was working from home when he was arrested and charged by the FBI in 2020 for attempting to use bitcoin on the dark web to place a hit on a teenager.
Josh Duggar	42501-509		Serving a 12 year sentence, scheduled for release on February 2, 2033.	Former lobbyist and reality television personality from the TLC series 19 Kids and Counting. He was found guilty of receiving and possessing child sexual abuse materials, and sentenced for receipt of said materials.

== See also ==
- List of U.S. federal prisons
- Federal Bureau of Prisons
- Incarceration in the United States
