= Jana Wissmann =

American television personality (born 1990)

Jana Marie Wissmann
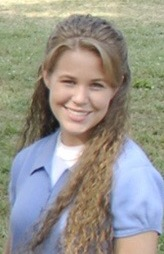
- Wissman in 2007
- Born: Jana Marie Duggar; January 12, 1990 (age 36); Tontitown, Arkansas, U.S.
- Occupation: TV personality
- Years active: 2004–2021
- Spouse: Stephen Wissmann (m. 2024)
- Children: 1
- Father: Jim Bob Duggar
- Relatives: Josh Duggar (brother); Jill Dillard (sister); Jessa Seewald (sister); Jinger Vuolo (sister); Joseph Duggar (brother)
- Website: www.duggarfamily.com

Jana Marie Wissmann (née Duggar; born January 12, 1990) is an American former television personality. She is known for her appearances on TLC as part of the reality television shows 19 Kids and Counting (2008–2015) and Counting On (2015–2021).

== Early life ==
Duggar was born in Tontitown, Arkansas, with her twin brother, John-David, as the first set of twins in the family and is the second child and first daughter of Jim Bob Duggar and Michelle Ruark. Their parents went on to have a total of 19 children, ten boys and nine girls. She was homeschooled as a child.

== Career ==
=== Television ===
Duggar began her public life as a member of the family featured in the documentary 14 Children and Pregnant Again (2004), which talks about daily life of the family from the "time they wake up" to the "time they go to sleep". The documentary aired on the Discovery Health Channel. Another documentary, Raising 16 Children was produced on the same channel in 2006, when Duggar's sister Johannah was born. This was followed by another feature, On the Road with 16 Children about a family cross-country trip.

On September 29, 2008, 19 Kids and Counting (formerly 18 Kids and Counting and 17 Kids and Counting) began as a regular series based on the Duggar family. The show ran until its cancellation in 2015.

Another series, Jill & Jessa: Counting On, starring Jessa and her sister Jill, premiered on December 13, 2015. Various other family members were featured on the show. It followed the Duggars present lives after 19 Kids and Counting was cancelled. The show was cancelled in 2021 following the arrest of Josh Duggar.

=== Books ===
Duggar co-wrote the book Growing Up Duggar: It's All About Relationships with her sisters Jill, Jessa, and Jinger. It was released on March 4, 2014, by Howard Books. The book focuses on life in the Duggar home, their social relationships, and religious beliefs.

== Personal life ==
In 2021, Duggar was charged with a misdemeanor count of endangering the welfare of a minor. She was babysitting when a child wandered outside and was found by a passerby, who called the police. Duggar originally entered a not guilty plea but later changed her plea to guilty and paid an $880 fine and other costs, avoiding a trial and potential jail time.

On August 15, 2024, Duggar married Stephen Wissmann after getting engaged two months prior on June 15, 2024. They had been in a relationship some years before and stayed in touch after initially breaking up. She gave birth to their first child, a son named Archie Gerald Wissmann, on December 30, 2025.
