= Jeremy Vuolo =

American soccer player (born 1987)

- Born: Jeremy Joseph Vuolo; September 5, 1987 (age 39); Downingtown, Pennsylvania, U.S.
- Height: 1.90 m (6 ft 3 in)
- Spouse: Jinger Duggar (m. 2016)
Association football career
- Position: Goalkeeper
College career
Years	Team	Apps	(Gls)
2006–2009	Hartwick Hawks	53	(0)
2010	Syracuse Orange	16	(0)
Senior career*
Years	Team	Apps	(Gls)
2005–2010	Reading United	66	(0)
2011	AC Oulu	24	(0)
2012	New York Red Bulls	0	(0)
2013–2014	San Antonio Scorpions	20	(0)
- * Club domestic league appearances and goals as of June 23, 2013

Jeremy Joseph Vuolo (born September 5, 1987) is a former American soccer player for Major League Soccer, North American Soccer League and Finnish second tier Ykkönen. After marrying Jinger Duggar (one of the 19 Duggar children of 19 Kids and Counting), he appeared on the spinoff series Counting On.

== Early life and education ==
Vuolo was born in Philadelphia, Pennsylvania, to Chuck and Diana Vuolo. He was homeschooled throughout his school years, except for his senior year, when he attended Downingtown West High School. He graduated from Hartwick College in 2010 with a degree in Business Administration.

== Soccer career ==
Vuolo began playing college soccer in 2006 at Hartwick College before transferring to Syracuse University in 2010 to complete his senior year. Before and during college, Vuolo also appeared for PDL club Reading United between 2005 and 2010.

After college, Vuolo signed with Finnish club AC Oulu and appeared in 24 games for the team, recording 11 cleansheets. Vuolo returned to the United States when he signed with the club New York Red Bulls of Major League Soccer in 2012.

After his release from New York, Vuolo briefly stepped away from the game to concentrate on full-time ministry, but announced in April 2013 that he had signed with NASL club San Antonio Scorpions.

== Personal life ==
Vuolo married reality TV personality Jinger Duggar in 2016. They have three children, Felicity Nicole, Evangeline Jo ("Evie Jo"), and Finnegan Charles ("Finn"). He is a Reformed Baptist (Calvinist) Christian. The family are part of Grace Community Church in Los Angeles, and Vuolo also attended and is employed by The Master's Seminary, which is affiliated with the church.
