= Jinger Vuolo =

American reality television personality (born 1993)

- Born: Jinger Nicole Duggar; December 21, 1993 (age 32)
- Occupation: Television personality
- Years active: 2004–present
- Spouse: Jeremy Vuolo (m. 2016)
- Children: 3
- Father: Jim Bob Duggar
- Relatives: Josh Duggar (brother); Jana Wissmann (sister); Jill Dillard (sister); Jessa Seewald (sister); Joseph Duggar (brother)
- Website: www.jingerandjeremy.com

Jinger Nicole Vuolo (née Duggar; born December 21, 1993; /ˈdʒɪndʒər/ JIN-jər) is an American television personality and author. She is known for her television appearances on TLC reality shows 19 Kids and Counting (2008–2015) and Counting On (2015–2021).

She also co-authored a book with her sisters Jana, Jill and Jessa titled Growing Up Duggar: It's All About Relationships.

== Early life ==
Vuolo is the sixth child of Jim Bob and Michelle Duggar. She has stated that she suffered from an eating disorder as a teenager.

== Career ==
=== Television ===
Vuolo began her public life as a member of the family featured in the documentary 14 Children and Pregnant Again (2004), which talks about daily life of the family from the "time they wake up" to the "time they go to sleep". The documentary aired on the Discovery Health Channel. Another documentary, Raising 16 Children was produced on the same channel in 2006, when Vuolo's sister Johannah was born. This was followed by another feature, On the Road with 16 Children about a family cross-country trip.

On September 29, 2008, 19 Kids and Counting (formerly 18 Kids and Counting and 17 Kids and Counting) began as a regular series based on the Duggar family. The show was cancelled in 2015 due to her brother Josh's scandals. Another series, Jill & Jessa: Counting On, starring her sisters Jill and Jessa, premiered later in 2015. Various other family members were featured on the show. It followed the Duggars present lives after 19 Kids and Counting was cancelled. TLC announced that the series was cancelled on June 29, 2021.

=== Books ===
Vuolo co-wrote the book Growing Up Duggar, published by Howard Books with her sisters Jana, Jill, and Jessa. It was released on March 4, 2014. The book shares an inside look at what being a Duggar child is like as they talk about their parents' faith and perspectives on life.

She also co-wrote a second book, The Hope We Hold: Finding Peace with the Promises of God with her husband, Jeremy Vuolo, published by Worthy Publishing in 2021. The book details the couple's relationship, faith, move to Laredo, Texas and Los Angeles, birth of first daughter and subsequent miscarriage.

In early 2023 she released a third book, Becoming Free Indeed: My Story of Disentangling Faith from Fear, co-written with Corey Williams and published by Thomas Nelson. In it she goes in depth on the teachings of Bill Gothard that she and her siblings were raised in, the detrimental effects it had on her life growing up, and how she separated her faith from the things taught in Gothard's courses.

A fourth book written by her called, People Pleaser: Breaking Free from the Burden of Imaginary Expectations was released on January 14, 2025 and was published by Thomas Nelson.

== Personal life ==
Vuolo met former professional soccer player Jeremy Vuolo while on a mission trip to Central America in 2015. The couple married in November 2016 and have two daughters and a son.

The family are part of Grace Community Church in Los Angeles, and Vuolo's husband also attended and is employed by The Master's Seminary, which is affiliated with the church.

In January 2023, Vuolo criticized the Duggar family's "cult-like" religious beliefs, telling People magazine that "Fear was a huge part of my childhood [...] I thought I had to wear only skirts and dresses to please God. Music with drums, places I went or the wrong friendships could all bring harm," and that "the teaching I grew up under was harmful, it was damaging, and there are lasting effects." Vuolo also provided more criticism of the Duggar family in her book Becoming Free Indeed: My Story of Disentangling Faith from Fear.
