= Jessa Seewald =

American reality television personality (born 1992)

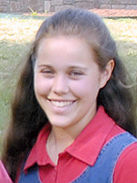
- Seewald in 2007
- Born: Jessa Lauren Duggar; November 4, 1992 (age 34); Tontitown, Arkansas, U.S.
- Occupation: Television personality
- Years active: 2004–present
- Spouse: Benjamin Seewald (m. 2014)
- Children: 6
- Father: Jim Bob Duggar
- Relatives: Josh Duggar (brother); Jana Wissmann (sister); Jill Dillard (sister); Jinger Vuolo (sister); Joseph Duggar (brother)

Jessa Lauren Seewald (née Duggar; born November 4, 1992) is an American television personality. She is known for being part of the cast of TLC's reality shows 19 Kids and Counting (2008–2015) and Counting On (2015–2021). She also co-authored a book with her sisters Jana, Jill and Jinger titled Growing Up Duggar: It's All About Relationships.

== Career ==
=== Television ===
Seewald began her public life as a member of the family featured in the documentary 14 Children and Pregnant Again (2004), on the Discovery Health Channel. Another documentary, Raising 16 Children was produced on the same channel in 2006, when her sister Johannah was born. This was followed by another feature, On the Road with 16 Children about a family cross-country trip.

On September 29, 2008, 19 Kids and Counting (formerly 18 Kids and Counting and 17 Kids and Counting) began as a regular series based on the Duggar family. The series was cancelled in 2015 due to her brother Josh's scandals. Another series, Jill & Jessa: Counting On, starring Seewald and her sister Jill, premiered later in 2015. The series was cancelled in 2021 due to Josh Duggar's arrest.

=== Book ===
With three of her sisters, Seewald co-wrote Growing up Duggar, a book published by Howard Books, in 2014. The book describes growing up in the Duggar home, social relationships, and their religious beliefs.

== Personal life ==
Seewald was born in Tontitown, Arkansas USA, as the fifth child and the third daughter of Jim Bob and Michelle Duggar's 19 children. She married her boyfriend of 14 months following a 3-month-long engagement. They have six children. In 2023, she revealed she had a miscarriage in December 2022.

In a June 2015 interview on The Kelly File, Seewald identified herself as one of the girls sexually abused by her oldest brother, Josh Duggar, when he was a teenager. She described the abuse as "mild inappropriate touching," saying it occurred while she was sleeping and fully clothed. Seewald further stated she became aware of the abuse after her parents told her what had occurred following her brother's confession. While Seewald described the abuse as "very wrong," she decried those referring to her brother as a "child molester" or a "pedophile" or a "rapist", saying, "that is so overboard, and a lie, really." Regarding the police reports describing the abuse while she was a minor being released to the media, Seewald said, "the system that was set up to protect kids...it's greatly failed."
