= Joseph Duggar =

American reality television personality (born 1995)

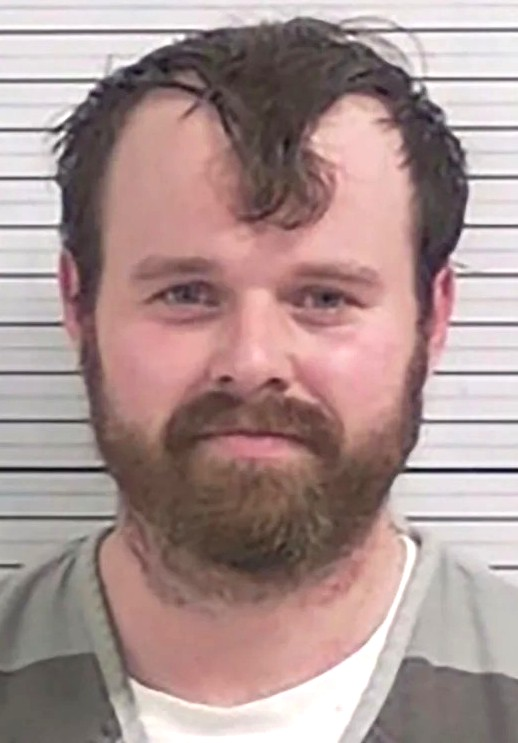
- Joseph Duggar in 2026
- Born: Joseph Garrett Duggar; January 20, 1995 (age 31); Tontitown, Arkansas, U.S.
- Occupation: Licensed real estate agent
- Years active: 2004–2017
- Spouse: Kendra Caldwell (m. 2017)
- Children: 4
- Father: Jim Bob Duggar
- Relatives: Josh Duggar (brother); Jana Wissmann (sister); Jill Dillard (sister); Jessa Seewald (sister); Jinger Vuolo (sister)

Joseph Garrett Duggar (born January 20, 1995) is a former television personality. He is known for his appearances on the TLC reality television series 19 Kids and Counting and Counting On.

== Early life ==
Duggar was born on January 20, 1995, in Tontitown, Arkansas, as the seventh child and the third son of Jim Bob and Michelle Duggar. He was homeschooled growing up and obtained his GED at the age of 16. He attended Crown College in Minnesota for one year.

== Career ==
Duggar first appeared on television during the documentary 14 Children and Pregnant Again in 2004, which aired on the Discovery Health Channel. Later documentaries about the family include Raising 16 Children and On the Road with 16 Children, which featured insights into their daily lives.

In 2008, 19 Kids and Counting (formerly 18 Kids and Counting and 17 Kids and Counting) began on TLC as a regular series based on the Duggar family. The show was later cancelled in 2015, following the publication of police report from 2006 regarding his brother, Josh, who had molested several underage girls, including many of his sisters.

Duggar also featured in spinoff show, Counting On, which aired from 2015 to 2020, and was cancelled due to his brother, Josh, being arrested for receiving and possessing child pornography.

After attending Crown College, Duggar returned to Arkansas. He later obtained a real estate license in Tontitown and formed a company called Good Neighbor Realty.

== Legal issues ==
On March 18, 2026, Joseph Duggar was arrested and charged with several counts of unlawful sexual activity with a minor. The charges relate to an incident in 2020 when he allegedly molested an unnamed girl, then nine years old, while in the state of Florida. On March 20, 2026, Duggar waived his right to an extradition hearing in Arkansas, which set in motion his transfer to Florida to face a child molestation charge.

Joseph and his wife, Kendra Duggar, were arrested and charged with multiple counts of endangering the welfare of a minor and with false imprisonment on March 20, 2026. Kendra Duggar was released on $1,470 bond, later that same day. Both parents were ordered not to have contact with the involved children.

On March 31, 2026, Duggar appeared in a Florida courtroom. He was informed of the charges against him and of his arraignment date. Duggar was ordered to have no contact of any kind with the accuser and no unsupervised contact with any minor, including his own children. He was released the same day on $600,000 bond.

On April 17, 2026, the judge dissolved Kendra Duggar's no-contact order.

On April 28, 2026, an attorney for Joseph and Kendra Duggar entered not guilty pleas on their behalf.

On May 18, 2026, a hearing was held in Florida for the sexual abuse charges. A not guilty plea was entered.

On June 16, 2026, Joseph Duggar appeared remotely in a Florida courtroom regarding two motions filed a month earlier. The first sought permission to work on several rental properties that he owns, which would place him within 500 feet of his alleged victim. The second sought to lift the requirement that his visits with his children be supervised. The judge denied both motions.

On July 14, 2026, Duggar's attorney Albert Sauline appeared for a pretrial hearing in a Bay County courtroom, in front of Judge Brantley S. Clark. Also present was Joao Ferreira, the attorney representing the state of Florida in the case. Duggar was not present. Sauline stated his belief that the state of Florida had received "all of the discovery" from the state of Arkansas.

On August 10, 2026, a judge signed off on a plea by order for Joseph and Kendra Duggar, in Elm Springs District Court, in regards for the charges of endangering the welfare of a minor in the second-degree and four counts of false imprisonment in the second-degree. They must pay fines and costs totalling $1,850, and for one year, both of them must follow all court orders as well as any directions of the Arkansas Department of Human Services and not commit any crimes. At the end of the year, if these conditions are met, the charges will be dropped and there will be no sentencing.

On September 15, 2026, Joseph Duggar was represented in a Florida court without being present himself. His lawyer, Albert Sauline, advised the judge that he and the state prosecutor had spoken with a witness, and there would likely be more witnesses added to the state's case against Duggar. Sauline requested another court date so they could schedule further depositions. Judge Brantley Clark set the next court date for November 10.

On November 10, 2026, a Florida judge scheduled a pretrial hearing for March 9, 2027.

== Personal life ==
Joseph married Kendra Renée Caldwell on September 8, 2017 at the First Baptist Church in Siloam Springs, Arkansas. The couple have four children.
