= Louis McJunkin =

American politician (1931–2010)

Louis Marian McJunkin (February 20, 1931 – November 12, 2010) was an American politician.

== Personal life ==
Louis McJunkin was born to parents Elias Alfred McJunkin and Anna Valentine Jenkins on February 20, 1931. The family moved from Louis' birthplace of Lawton, Oklahoma in 1936, to Siloam Springs, Arkansas. He began working as a wheat harvester in 1948, and subsequently operated an Esso station in Siloam Springs. McJunkin served in the United States Army's 24th Infantry Division during the Korean War. Upon his return to Arkansas in 1953, McJunkin married Lois June Shay and joined McDonnell Douglas. From 1958, McJunkin was self-employed, having founded Noark Oil and Auto Supply. He died in Springdale on November 12, 2010, at the age of 79.

== Political career ==
McJunkin was affiliated with the Democratic Party. He sat in the Arkansas House of Representatives from 1984 to 1999, from District 6.
