= Counting On =

American television series

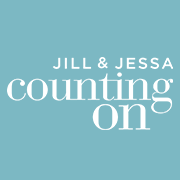
- Genre: Reality
- Starring: The Duggar Family
- Country of origin: United States
- Original language: English
- No. of seasons: 11
- No. of episodes: 96 (list of episodes)

Production
- Camera setup: Multiple
- Running time: 17–44 minutes

Original release
- Network: TLC
- Release: December 13, 2015 – September 22, 2020

Related
- 19 Kids and Counting

Counting On (formerly Jill & Jessa: Counting On) is an American reality television show that aired on the cable channel TLC from 2015 to 2020. A spin-off show of 19 Kids and Counting, it features the Duggar family: Jessa Seewald, Jinger Vuolo, Joy-Anna Forsyth, and fifteen of their sixteen siblings, as well as their parents Jim Bob and Michelle. The show was created in the wake of the molestation scandal concerning Josh Duggar and subsequent cancellation of 19 Kids and Counting.

The show follows the lives of the older Duggar offspring, with the early episodes focusing specifically on Jill Dillard and Jessa Seewald. After its first season, the show expanded to include the rest of the Duggar siblings and their respective families. The series was cancelled in 2021, due to Josh Duggar's arrest for receiving and possessing child pornography. In March 2026, seventh eldest Duggar child Joseph Duggar was arrested for "lewd and lascivious behavior", including molestation of a victim younger than 12, regarding an incident that occurred in 2020- a year before the show was cancelled- with a then 9-year-old girl in Panama City Beach, Florida while on a family vacation. His wife Kendra, who married Joseph on a 2017 episode of Counting On, would soon afterwards be criminally charged for this alleged incident of child molestation as well.

== Cast ==
- Jana Duggar
- John-David and Abbie Duggar, with their daughter Grace
- Jessa and Ben Seewald, with their children: Spurgeon, Henry, and Ivy
- Jinger and Jeremy Vuolo, with their daughter Felicity
- Joe and Kendra Duggar, with their children: Garrett and Addison
- Josiah and Lauren Duggar, with their daughter Bella
- Joy-Anna and Austin Forsyth, with their son Gideon
- Jim Bob, Michelle Duggar and their ten younger children: Jedidiah, Jeremiah, Jason, James, Justin, Jackson, Johannah, Jennifer, Jordyn and Josie; plus the couple's great nephew Tyler
- Anna Duggar and her children: Mackynzie, Michael, Marcus, Meredith, Mason and Maryella
- Jill and Derick Dillard, with their son Israel
- Mary Leona Duggar (née Lester), the mother of Jim Bob. She died on June 9, 2019, from drowning at age 78.

== Series overview ==
Season	Episodes	Originally released	
Season	Episodes	First released	Last released
1	3	December 13, 2015	December 27, 2015
2	8	March 15, 2016	May 3, 2016
3	13	August 23, 2016	November 15, 2016
4	7	January 16, 2017	February 27, 2017
5	8	June 12, 2017	July 24, 2017
6	7	September 11, 2017	October 23, 2017
7	7	February 26, 2018	March 26, 2018
8	11	July 30, 2018	October 1, 2018
9	7	February 11, 2019	March 25, 2019
10	10	October 15, 2019	December 17, 2019
11	12	July 7, 2020	September 22, 2020
