= Josh Duggar =

American TV personality and sex offender (born 1988)

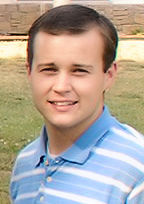
- Duggar in 2007
- Born: Joshua James Duggar; March 3, 1988 (age 38); Tontitown, Arkansas, U.S.
- Occupations: Former reality television personality; former political activist
- Years active: 2004–2015
- Known for: 19 Kids and Counting; Subject of the Ashley Madison data breach scandal; Conviction of possessing and receiving child sexual abuse material
- Spouse: Anna Keller (m. 2008)
- Children: 7
- Parents: Jim Bob Duggar (father); Michelle Duggar (mother)
- Relatives: Jana Wissmann (sister); Jill Dillard (sister); Jessa Seewald (sister); Jinger Vuolo (sister); Joseph Duggar (brother); Joy-Anna Forsyth (sister)
- Status: Incarcerated at FCI Elkton
- Convictions: Receipt of child pornography (18 U.S.C. § 2252); Possession of child pornography (18 U.S.C. § 2252)
- Penalty: 12 years and 7 months in federal prison, 20 years' supervised release, $10,000 fine, $40,100 special assessment

Joshua James Duggar (born March 3, 1988) is an American convicted sex offender and former reality television personality. The eldest of Michelle and Jim Bob Duggar's nineteen children, Duggar and his family gained fame as the focus of the TLC series 19 Kids and Counting, which spun off from a series of television specials. His 2008 wedding was aired on the show. He served as the executive director of FRC Action, a lobbying political action committee sponsored by the Family Research Council, from June 2013 to May 2015. He resigned from the position after it was reported that he had molested multiple underage girls from 2000 to 2004 when he was between the ages of 12 and 16. This included four of his sisters.

These revelations led to the cancellation of 19 Kids and Counting on July 16, 2015. One month after the show's cancellation, the Ashley Madison data breach revealed that he had paid for sexual services while married. The fallout was named one of the "10 Big Scandals of 2015" by USA Today, and The Washington Post listed Duggar as one of the fifteen most hated people on the Internet for that year. While the family returned in the Counting On spin-off with episodes released 2015–2020, Duggar did not take part in its production.

On April 29, 2021, Duggar was arrested by U.S. Marshals on charges of receiving and possessing child sexual abuse material. Soon after his arrest, the family's Counting On series was cancelled. Duggar was found guilty on all charges on December 9, 2021, and sentenced to more than 12 years in prison on May 25, 2022.

== Early life ==
Josh Duggar was born on March 3, 1988, in the city of Tontitown in Washington County, Arkansas, to James Robert and Michelle Annette Ruark Duggar. For most of his youth, Duggar was homeschooled and passed Arkansas's state test for a general equivalency diploma at the age of 16. Although he expressed interest in law school, Duggar ultimately did not attend college.

== Career ==
=== Reality television personality ===
Starting in 2005, Duggar appeared on a number of reality television shows about his family, beginning with a program on Discovery Health when he was aged 17. The most prominent of these programs was the TLC series 19 Kids and Counting, which debuted in September 2008. Duggar's wedding was featured in an episode broadcast on January 25, 2009, which included the planning, preparation, rehearsal, ceremony and reception. Duggar and his wife have stated they saved their first kiss for their wedding day.

Multiple episodes document Duggar's children, including: "GrandDuggar's First Birthday", airing December 7, 2010, where Duggar celebrates his daughter Mackynzie's first birthday and announces the expected birth of their second child; "First Grandson", airing June 19, 2011, which featured Duggar and his wife introducing their second child, Michael James; and "GrandDuggar Makes 3!", airing June 16, 2013, a Father's Day special introducing the Duggars' third baby, Marcus Anthony. A special titled "Josh & Anna: Our Story" aired on October 22, 2013, reviewed the couple's first five years of marriage. Duggar and his wife announced the expected birth of their fourth child on an episode titled "Anna's Having A...", which aired May 12, 2015. The episode included the Duggars announcing the ultrasound showed they were having another girl.

=== Political activity ===
When Duggar was a teenager, his father, Jim Bob Duggar, was a two-term Republican member of the Arkansas House of Representatives. Duggar has also been active in conservative politics; while running a car dealership he worked as a part-time political consultant in 2007 under the business name Strategic Political Services. In 2008, he worked on the Republican presidential primary campaign of former Arkansas Governor Mike Huckabee. In 2012, Duggar addressed rallies for the Republican presidential candidate Rick Santorum of Pennsylvania.

From June 2013 to May 2015, he was executive director of FRC Action, a political action and lobbying organization sponsored by the Family Research Council. When describing his position with the organization, he stated that he would be focused on "engaging the grassroots and taking the message of faith, family and freedom all across America". FRC president Tony Perkins said that by hiring Duggar they hoped to appeal to more young people by tapping into the popularity of 19 Kids and Counting. He further stated, "The big part of Josh's focus is going to be building our grass-roots across the country". While working at FRC Action, conservative Republican candidates valued Duggar as a way to advance their messages to his constituents. He campaigned for Senate candidates in Kansas, Mississippi, and Virginia before the 2014 midterm elections.

Duggar described his family as the "epitome of conservative values" and advocated for what he termed "family-centered" and conservative Christian viewpoints, including opposition to abortion, divorce, and gay marriage. He has been referred to as an "anti-gay activist" by GLAAD, a pro-LGBT rights organization.

== Molestation scandal ==
=== 2002–2003 ===
As a young teen, Josh touched the breasts and genital region of his sisters on multiple occasions while they were sleeping, and sometimes when they were awake. Four of the molestation victims were Duggar's siblings: he had reached under the dress of a younger sister who was in his lap, cornered a sister in the laundry room to reach under her clothing, and touched a much younger sister, who, according to the Duggars, "didn't understand she had been improperly touched". The fifth victim was a babysitter.

His parents said they learned of Josh's sexually abusive behavior in March 2002. The following July, Josh admitted to molesting one of his sisters, and his parents disciplined him at home. His confession was not reported to police. In March 2003, the parents learned of additional incidents and victims, and Jim Bob brought the issue to their church elders and to their closest friends, Jim and Bobye Holt. The Holts informed their daughter, Kaeleigh, whom Josh had been courting. She wrote an angry note about the matter and stored it between the pages of a book.

Josh was ultimately sent away from home for three months. Jim Bob told police that during this time Josh stayed at the Veterans' affairs Hospital in Little Rock, Arkansas, allegedly attending a counseling program run by a Christian ministry that involved physical labor. However, Michelle Duggar would later tell police that Josh was not involved in counseling, instead working under a family friend to help remodel the building. In Jill Duggar's memoir Counting the Cost, she says her parents told her that Josh had a temporary construction job with family friends.

In July 2003, after Josh returned home—and 16 months after his initial confession to his parents—Jim Bob took him to meet Joseph Truman Hutchens, an Arkansas State Trooper and family acquaintance. According to Josh and his parents, the meeting was the first time any law enforcement authority was made aware of the abuse. Under Arkansas state law, law enforcement officers, as mandated reporters, are required to alert the Arkansas Child Abuse Hotline when learning of sexual abuse. However, Hutchens did not take any official action. He reportedly gave Josh a "stern talk". Jim Bob later claimed that Hutchens was told the entire story and that Josh admitted to Hutchens that he had molested several children and apologized. Speaking via a lawyer, Hutchens disputed part of the account, saying he was only told of a single act of incestuous molestation and that he would have responded differently if he had known of additional instances and victims. Hutchens was himself convicted in 2012 of unrelated charges relating to child sexual abuse material and was sentenced to 56 years in prison.

=== 2006–2007 ===
In 2004 and 2006, the first four television specials featuring the Duggar family were released.

In 2006, Kaeleigh Holt loaned a book to her friend, a fellow church member. The letter she had written about Josh three years earlier was still inside the book. In December 2006, Kaeleigh's friend, having discovered the evidence against Josh (who was then 18), called the Arkansas Child Abuse Hotline to reveal his past sexual misconduct toward minors. She also anonymously emailed Oprah Winfrey's production company, Harpo Studios, as the Duggar family was scheduled to appear on The Oprah Winfrey Show. Winfrey's producers alerted the Department of Human Services and canceled the Duggar family's appearance.

Springdale police began investigating. Jim Bob told them that Josh had molested five underage girls between 2002 and 2003, when he was 14 and 15 years old. Several family members said there had been no incidents since Duggar returned to the home in late 2003, that they felt safe in their home, and that they had forgiven Duggar for his past behavior.

Under the Arkansas statute of limitations, child sexual abuse charges must be filed within three years of being reported to a police officer. Because of the July 2003 contact with Hutchens, no charges could be filed in December 2006 as the statute of limitations had expired five months earlier.

=== 2015 ===
Via a Freedom of Information Act request, In Touch Weekly obtained a redacted police report. On May 21, 2015, they published a story about the 2002–2003 events which had been previously unknown to the public. Duggar resigned his position at FRC Action the same day. He stated that he had "acted inexcusably" as a teen and was "deeply sorry" for what he called his wrongdoings. FRC president Tony Perkins said: "Josh believes that the situation will make it difficult for him to be effective in his current work. We believe this is the best decision for Josh and his family at this time. We will be praying for everyone involved."

==== Debate over release of police reports ====
Immediately after the article was published, an unidentified victim who was reportedly still a minor requested that any remaining products of the investigation be destroyed. The Arkansas Freedom of Information Act states that the records of a juvenile "shall remain confidential" and "shall not be subject to disclosure under the FOI". On May 21, 2015, to protect the victim's privacy, state judge Stacey Zimmerman granted their request and ordered all copies of the report destroyed. On May 23, Arkansas State Senator Bart Hester called for Springdale Police Chief Kathy O'Kelley to be fired, saying that she had re-victimized Duggar's victims by releasing his records.

Then, on June 3, In Touch reported they had obtained another police report. On June 4, Springdale city attorney Ernest Cate defended the release of the records, pointing out the redaction of the names and genders of those who were still minors when the police report was filed.

On June 5, Duggar's sisters Jessa and Jill gave an interview to Megyn Kelly on Fox News, discussing the abuse and the reports' release. Jessa called Duggar's actions as a teen "very wrong" and stated, "I do want to speak up in his defense against people who are calling him a child molester or a pedophile or a rapist, as some people are saying ... [T]hat is so overboard and a lie really ... I mean, people get mad at me for saying that, but I can say this because I was one of the victims." She further stated that "the system was set up to protect kids ... it's greatly failed", and that the week preceding the interview had been "a thousand times worse for us" than the sexual abuse. Jill called the release of the police reports "a revictimization".

On August 30, TLC broadcast "Breaking the Silence," a documentary about child sex abuse. Jessa and Jill were among the interviewees.

In 2017, Jessa and Jill sued Springdale and Washington County officials. In June 2020, the 8th Circuit U.S. Court of Appeals dismissed the lawsuit, saying the defendants had "qualified immunity" and the plaintiffs had not established their right to "informational integrity privacy." Similarly, in February 2022, a federal judge dismissed the case, saying that the officials had broken the law merely out of negligence rather than intention and thus had immunity.

== Admissions following Ashley Madison breach ==
On August 20, 2015, Duggar and his parents released a statement in which he admitted to watching pornography on the Internet and being unfaithful to his wife. This immediately followed the Ashley Madison data breach which revealed that Duggar's credit card had been used to pay $986.76 for two subscriptions starting in February 2013. The subscriptions had been cancelled in May 2015 shortly after the molestation allegations surfaced. Ashley Madison, a dating website, was marketed to married people seeking affairs.

The statement, posted to the Duggar family website, contained the following:

"I have been the biggest hypocrite ever. While espousing faith and family values, I have secretly over the last several years been viewing pornography on the Internet and this became a secret addiction and I became unfaithful to my wife ... the last few years, while publicly stating I was fighting against immorality in our country I was hiding my own personal failures".

Later in the day, the reference to pornography was removed.

In 2026, Duggar told a court that he had neither written nor approved of the statement and that the television producers had wanted it.

On August 25, 2015, Duggar checked himself into a rehabilitation facility that his family described as a "long-term treatment center". The facility was later confirmed in media reports as Reformers Unanimous, which describes itself as "a learning atmosphere where the addicted can be discipled in an environment that is much like a greenhouse".

== Sexual assault allegations ==
In November 2015, pornographic actress Danica Dillon filed suit against Duggar, claiming he had "assaulted her to the point of causing her physical and emotional injuries" during a sexual interaction at a Philadelphia strip club earlier in the year. According to Dillon, the incident occurred after she had provided $600 worth of lap dances to Duggar. Dillon was seeking $500,000 in damages from him. In February 2016, Dillon chose to drop the lawsuit after evidence showed that Duggar was not in Philadelphia at the time.

== 2021 arrest, trial, and conviction for child sexual abuse material ==
The U.S. Attorney for the Western District of Arkansas recommended a federal investigation of Duggar. In November 2019, as a part of a U.S. Department of Justice initiative to protect children from sexual abuse and exploitation, U.S. Homeland Security agents searched Duggar's used car dealership, Wholesale Motorcars. On April 29, 2021, U.S. Marshals arrested Duggar on federal charges of receiving and possessing CSAM (child sexual abuse material). Prosecutors believed the images were transmitted in May 2019. Law enforcement became aware of Duggar's illegal activity during an investigation into a file-sharing service that Duggar was known to use, noting that Duggar was the only employee present when the files were downloaded. The federal grand jury's indictment accused Duggar of "knowingly" receiving pornographic images of children who were under 12 years old. Duggar was arrested and booked into the Washington County Jail. On April 30, 2021, he pleaded not guilty to one count each of charges of receiving and possessing CSAM.

U.S. Chief Magistrate Judge Erin L. Wiedemann said that, if Duggar were to be awarded bail, he would have to be "in a residence where there's no minor in the home". At that time, Duggar's six children were under the age of 11, and his wife Anna was pregnant; the seventh child was born in October 2021. Duggar was granted conditional bail at a bond hearing on May 5, and he was released from jail and transferred into the custody of a third-party custodian. As part of the conditions for his bail, Duggar was permitted to have contact with his children only in the presence of his wife. He was required to wear an ankle monitor and to obtain a probation officer's permission to leave the third-party custodian's home. Furthermore, he was not allowed to access the Internet and could not be inside a residence where firearms were stored.

Gerald Faulkner, a special agent for Homeland Security Investigations, stated the files on the computer were "in the top five of the worst of the worst that I've ever had to examine". One of the videos allegedly in Duggar's possession is a hurtcore video, named Daisy's Destruction, created by Australian murderer and rapist Peter Scully, which depicts the rape and torture of three young girls including an 18-month-old toddler and the apparent murder of a 12-year-old girl.

=== Trial ===
Duggar's trial, originally set for July 6, 2021, was rescheduled for November 30. He did not meet an October deadline to accept a plea deal.

Duggar's lawyers, trying to get the case dismissed, used procedural nuisances that the judge deemed "frivolous". Their further attempts to suppress evidence similarly were denied by a judge. The prosecution wanted to bring up sexual assault accusations made against Duggar when he was a young teenager; the defense alleged these charges were irrelevant and could prejudice a jury. A pretrial hearing was held on November 18, at which the judge demanded an evidentiary hearing. The evidentiary hearing was held on November 29 in a Fayetteville court to determine if Duggar's father Jim Bob Duggar and family friend Bobye Holt could testify as prosecution witnesses during his trial. During this three-hour hearing, both took the stand, with Holt testifying that Josh Duggar had fondled four younger girls since the age of 12.

On November 30, the trial began. The jury was selected, and Duggar's lawyer motioned for trial judge Timothy L. Brooks to dismiss "any further testimony" from Holt. The next day, the judge denied Duggar lawyer's request to dismiss past abuse allegations from evidence; opening statements were heard, and the first witness, Detective Amber Kalmer of the Little Rock Police Department, testified. On December 3, an official from the Department of Justice testified that the hard drive in Duggar's computer had been partitioned into two sections: one which had Windows installed that he used mainly for business, and the second with Linux installed, which he used to download, access and share CSAM. The accountability software Covenant Eyes had been installed on the Windows side and was set to alert Duggar's spouse when pornography was viewed, but the software could not detect what was accessed while the computer was using Linux. Husband and wife Jim and Bobye Holt were called as witnesses for the prosecution. Jim Holt testified that Josh Duggar had asked him how to create the Linux partition on a computer in 2010, while Bobye Holt reiterated the same information that she testified on November 29. The Holts testified that at least one of the girls had reported the abuse (whereas Michelle had told Fox News in 2015 that the girls were initially unaware the abuse had occurred).

On December 9, 2021, a jury found Duggar guilty of receiving and possessing CSAM.

=== Sentence ===
On May 25, 2022, Duggar was sentenced to 12 years and seven months in prison. His earliest possible release is February 2, 2033. This will be followed by 20 years of supervised release, during which he must register as a sex offender and can have no unsupervised contact with minors, including his own children. He can only access the Internet with the permission of his probation officer, and must agree to monitoring of his online activity. He was fined $10,000 and ordered to pay an additional $40,100 in special assessments. He had faced up to 20 years in federal prison and a fine of up to $250,000 for each of the two counts.

=== Aftermath ===
A day after Duggar's conviction, news of his sister Jana's child endangerment charge from September 2021 was published. On December 14, 2021, five days after Josh's conviction, Jim Bob Duggar finished third in the Republican primary in his bid to represent District 7 of the Arkansas State Senate.

Meanwhile, multiple Duggar family members and their spouses issued statements approving of the conviction, stating that justice was served and offering prayers for Duggar and his family.

Duggar's cousin, Amy Duggar King, had lost contact with her Duggar cousins in 2019 after leaving the Counting On show, and she says that Josh's wife Anna did not respond to her when she reached out after his 2021 arrest. King posted an open letter to Anna on May 17, 2022, telling her "there is no shame in divorcing Josh."

Josh Duggar tried but failed to change his legal outcome:

- On January 20, 2022, his legal team filed for acquittal, arguing that the evidence presented at trial did not support conviction. On May 24, the federal district court denied his request.
- On June 3, 2022, he appealed his conviction to the U.S. Court of Appeals for the Eighth Circuit. The court denied his appeal and upheld his conviction on August 7, 2023. He requested rehearing by the three-judge panel and by the entire court en banc, but the court denied both rehearing requests on September 28.
- He then appealed to the U.S. Supreme Court, but on June 24, 2024, it declined to hear his appeal, giving no comment.
- On June 1, 2026, U.S. District Judge Timothy L. Brooks of the U.S. District Court for the Western District of Arkansas denied Duggar's appeal to vacate his conviction, on the grounds that Duggar's April 15 appeal arrived too late. Duggar’s attorney, Beau Brindley, filed a notice of appeal on June 15.

Joshua Duggar began serving his sentence at FCI Seagoeville. He was transferred to FMC Fort Worth in May 2026. While Fort Worth often accommodates severely ill incarcerated people, Duggar's lawyer said the transfer was unrelated to his health. In June 2026, Duggar was moved again to FTC Oklahoma City. His lawyer called the recent transfers "punitive". In July 2026, Duggar was moved to FCI Elkton.

On April 29, 2026, his sentence was extended by an additional two months, with February 2, 2033 now being his scheduled release date.

==== Duggar family cover up allegations ====
Joseph Hutchens, the Arkansas state trooper who received the 2006 sex abuse report and who is serving a 56-year sentence for child pornography charges, alleged that the Duggar family had made efforts to conceal the extent of Josh's sex abuse.

== Personal life ==
On September 26, 2008, Duggar and Anna Renée Keller, both aged 20, were married at the Buford Grove Baptist Church in Hilliard, Florida. They have seven children. Any of Josh Duggar's visits with his children who are still minors at the time of the release will have to be supervised, and he must report to the parole office for the next 20 years after his release.
