= Institute in Basic Life Principles =

Christian organization in Oak Brook, Illinois, US

- Abbreviation: IBLP
- Founded: 1961
- Founder: Bill Gothard
- Type: 501(c)3 non-profit religious
- Location: Big Sandy, Texas, U.S.
- Region served: U.S., 12 countries
- Website: iblp.org

The Institute in Basic Life Principles (IBLP) is a nondenominational Christian fundamentalist organization established by American Christian minister Bill Gothard in 1961.

The organization's stated purpose is to provide instruction on how to find success in life by following biblical principles, via programs that include seminars for ministry, community outreach, troubled youth mentoring, and an international ministry. IBLP is a 501(c)(3) tax-exempt, nonprofit organization. However, it does not publicly release financial information; such information (such as IRS Form 990s) must be obtained from other groups which routinely obtain and publish said data.

The group is highly controversial, even within Christian circles, for its teachings and practices, including confirmed allegations of sexual impropriety by Gothard.

== History ==
IBLP was originally organized in 1961 under the name Campus Teams. The organization changed its name to Institute in Basic Youth Conflicts (IBYC) in 1974 (consistent with the title of its founder's seminar) and adopted its current name in 1989 (to reflect its expansion beyond the seminars).

IBLP was headquartered on a 223-acre compound in Hinsdale, Gothard's hometown (though it prominently featured its Box One, Oak Brook, Illinois mailing address on its promotional materials during its heyday and it can still be found on some materials). However, according to Chicago Magazine, sometime around 2015 it moved its headquarters and nearly all of its remaining operations to a facility east of the small East Texas town of Big Sandy. The facility was originally obtained by IBLP from Hobby Lobby President David Green in 2000, when he purchased the former Texas campus of Ambassador College and leased it to IBLP (it was later sold or donated to them according to public property records). As of 2026, the only facilities shown on the ministry's website are:

- the organization's headquarters in Texas, which houses most of its operations,
- the Northwoods Conference Center (a retreat center on 3,000 acres near Watersmeet, Michigan),
- a post office box in Conway, Arkansas for its prison ministry,
- Several parcels of land totally 223 acres near Indianapolis, Indiana, including Hope Center, designed to assist those who have been impacted by human trafficking, and
- several locations (some of which are mailing facilities only) in other countries.

IBLP started promoting Basic Youth Conflicts seminars in areas around the United States and other nations, which, according to its own history, saw attendances of up to 20,000 during the 1970s.

In 1976, the Institute published its first book, Character Sketches, the first in a series of books meant to provide instruction on the character of God. The Institute continued to publish books and pamphlets and in 2006, In These Times reported the IBLP earned US$63 million (equivalent to about $101 million in 2025).

From its inception through the early 1980s, the organization grew rapidly, both in the United States and internationally. However, in the 1980s, Gothard's brother, Steve Gothard, resigned as administrative director after having affairs with several secretaries of the institute; Bill (who was also accused of sexual impropriety, though not actual sexual intercourse) would "resign" for a brief time, only to return (in the wake of a power struggle) and establish near total control thereafter until his resignation and eventual removal in 2014. It would result in a decline in the group's popularity and growth.

In 2008 the rise to celebrity status of one group of IBLP followers, the Duggar family, through the TLC series 17 Kids and Counting and its subsequent shows, brought a new wave of interest in the organization and its teachings.

However, notwithstanding the increased interest, the public became increasingly aware of controversy (more specifically, allegations of sexual misconduct) associated with the organization and Gothard. Gothard allegedly selected young women for administrative positions within the organization, then manipulated and harassed them while in his employment.

In light of these events, Gothard would again resign from IBLP in 2014. This time, however, an investigation into the allegations by the IBLP board concluded he did not act "criminally" but did act "inappropriately", and therefore was "not permitted to serve in any counseling, leadership, or Board role within the IBLP ministry". Unlike his 1980 "resignation", this one was permanent (though an unconfirmed rumor on an anti-IBLP site claimed he did make an unsuccessful attempt to regain control). Since then, Gothard has not been involved in IBLP in any manner, and IBLP's website mentions him only in its historical section. (Though it continues to sell the Basic and Advanced Seminars he taught, it does not actively promote them.)

The sexual misconduct issues of the early 2010s led to a negative impact on IBLP's finances, which continues to this day: according to IRS Form 990s publicly available, since 2011 the organization has consistently had more expenses than revenues and a steady decline in total assets.

== IBLP Teachings ==
IBLP's Statement of Faith states that the organization holds to what it calls "historic" statements of Christian faith, and that "[t]he Bible itself is the source of all that we believe". However, IBLP's teachings were developed through Gothard's idiosyncratic interpretations of Biblical texts, which differ in many respects from Biblical interpretation as held by Evangelical Christians and have been accused of being elevated above the Bible itself. This has continued even after Gothard's departure from IBLP, though some of his teachings have been de-emphasized.

IBLP's teachings are based on what it calls seven "principles" or (ironically, given later criticism) "steps to freedom":

1. Design ("How and why God made me")
2. Authority ("Our response to God-ordained leadership")
3. Responsibility ("Cleansing the conscience")
4. Suffering ("Responding to the hurts inflicted upon me")
5. Ownership ("Properly handling material possessions")
6. Freedom ("Escaping the bondage of moral impurity")
7. Success ("How to fulfill our God-given purpose")

Of the seven principles, much of IBLP teaching is centered around Authority. IBLP emphasizes this principle via:

1. a strong view that authority is to be obeyed in nearly all circumstances,
2. an adherence to traditional gender norms and family roles, and
3. a belief that many Old Testament laws (such as dietary requirements and circumcision) are either still binding on Christian believers or are beneficial to keep (however, the organization does not teach Sabbatarianism).

IBLP teaches a version of Biblical patriarchy through what Gothard termed "umbrellas of authority": God is the largest umbrella, the husband/father is directly under that, then the wife/mother, and finally the child(ren). The idea is that if each person stays under their authority's umbrella, then nothing bad can happen to them, but if something bad does happen to them, it is because they moved out from under their umbrella, or that the umbrella (of the father/mother) had a "leak" due to "secret sin" causing harm to those under them.

IBLP's teaching focuses heavily on the roles and responsibilities of men and women within a marriage covenant. A husband's authority over his wife is God-given, as is his wife's non-negotiable duty to submit to him; she must respect his position regardless of his "deficiencies". Within marriage, IBLP teaches that God "grants spouses full access to each other's bodies for sexual gratification" and warns against "resistance or indifference to a husband's need for physical intimacy". A married woman should not seek financial independence, take "matters into her own hands", resist her husband's physical affection, or ask for outside counsel without his permission. Inwardly, married women are admonished to nurture a "meek and quiet spirit", while outwardly maintaining beauty, remaining "well-groomed", and striving to dress to "please their husbands".

Women are raised to become good wives and mothers (with large families; birth control is frowned upon), and to raise children according to IBLP principles; they are discouraged from seeking higher education, as their role in the IBLP system is in the home. IBLP teaches that an extensive family history needs to be compiled prior to a child being adopted, in order to "bind generational curses" that the child might bring into the adopting family. Gothard taught that divorce was never permitted for any reason.

Unmarried adult children are expected to continue to live with their parent(s) until marriage or parental death (Gothard himself - who has never married - did so until his parents died) and submit to them during that time. Adult children are not expected to "flirt" or date; instead, a male suitor is to request permission from the female's father (females are never to initiate the relationship), and eventually couples are matched after a complex courtship overseen by both sets of parents.

The consumption of media, such as television, movies, most music (including Contemporary Christian Music and Christian Rock), and the internet, is limited due to concern about immoral or "worldly" content. Similarly, some toys are prohibited for the same reasons (notably, Cabbage Patch Dolls, which Gothard considered "demonic"). Substances that have mentally impairing properties (such as alcohol, tobacco, and street drugs) are not permitted.

Women are expected to wear dresses or skirts that are knee-length at a minimum, and loose-fitting, opaque shirts and blouses (pants or pantsuits are considered "ungodly" when worn by women, under the premise that such clothing is forbidden in the Old Testament as it "pertains to a man"). Text printed onto dresses is not allowed, as it is thought to bring attention to the body. Jewelry and makeup, though not explicitly forbidden, are discouraged; head coverings (like those worn by women in Amish and Mennonite groups) are not required but can often be seen within IBLP groups. Men are expected to wear dark suits and white shirts when not wearing work gear. Men are also expected to be circumcised, as being uncircumcised is seen as impure.

Parents are encouraged to homeschool their children (attendance at public schools, or even Christian private schools, was highly discouraged). IBLP produced its own homeschooling curriculum, which IBLP adherents were strongly encouraged to use in lieu of more well-known curriculum (such as A Beka or BJU Press), which previously was available only to families accepted and enrolled into IBLP's homeschool program; the program was later discontinued and some of the material is now available for public purchase. Sexual education is not part of IBLP teachings (believing that to be the sole province of parents), leading some children and teens to not understand what sexual assault is, and the practice of not teaching sexual education has been criticized by adults who have since left the IBLP and struggle with relationships.

At one time, IBLP endorsed the teachings of Michael and Debi Pearl on physical discipline, which have come under scrutiny over the last several years.

IBLP teaches (through its "Financial Freedom Seminars") that borrowing money is wrong in all cases (even mortgages), and that churches and Christian ministries should never publicly solicit funds to meet financial needs (using George Müller and Hudson Taylor as examples, they are to simply "depend on God" to provide for needs); however, IBLP teaches that having an online giving option (common among churches and ministries) is acceptable. Families are expected to tithe and the tithe is only to go to their local church, never to another ministry. IBLP states that it follows all three principles in its financial dealings.

== IBLP Programs ==
Prior to Gothard's 2014 resignation and eventual permanent removal from IBLP, the majority of IBLP's programs (outside of the Basic Seminar) were available only to those who were involved in IBLP and committed to its teachings. IBLP/Gothard actively discouraged its followers from sharing the material with those outside of the group; thus, it was hard for groups who specialize in exposing cult and cult-like teachings to obtain information on the group and its beliefs.

After Gothard's departure, the organization significantly revised how it presented its teachings, in some cases (similar to what Grace Communion International did upon Herbert W. Armstrong's death) by canceling (or at least not actively promoting) entire programs which were started under Gothard. In addition, it began to make its material more accessible to the public for viewing and purchase.

=== Current Programs ===
==== Embassy Media ====
Embassy Media is an online subscription service featuring many Christian right speakers, both those affiliated with IBLP directly and those having other notable ministries within the Christian right, such as Wallbuilders founder David Barton and the Duggar family. Though founder Bill Gothard is not featured under the Speakers listing, the Basic and Advanced Seminars (the heart of IBLP's original teachings) are available. Subscriptions can be either monthly or annual.

==== ALERT ====
The Air Land Emergency Rescue Team (ALERT) is a training program for young men. It was started in 1994 and originally was held at IBLP's Northwoods Conference Center before relocating in 2000 to the Big Sandy complex.

It consists of three components (one does not have to be involved in all of them to complete the program, though it is strongly recommended):

- ALERT Cadet, a program for nuclear family fathers and sons (though boys with no father can participate through other relatives or family friends) which is structured similar to Cub Scouts and Boy Scouts or the more Christian-oriented Trail Life.
- Quest, a three-week program for young men teaching personal discipline and "useful life skills" (such as auto and home maintenance). A follow-on course (also three weeks in length) called Quest Advanced builds on the teachings of Quest.
- International ALERT Academy, a program for young men, consisting of three phases (one must complete the phases in order to advance to the next phase):
  - Basic Training, a nine-week program structured similar to military boot camp, focusing on "developing personal discipline, attention to detail, teamwork, time management, and healthy spiritual habits",
  - Intermediate Training, also nine weeks in length, which builds upon the teachings from Basic Training (covering topics from "leadership and apologetics" to "rope rescue and firefighting", and
  - Advanced Training, during which the young man can choose to be trained in one of nine specialty disciplines (ranging from nine to twelve weeks in length): Aviation, Basic Training Cadre, Construction, Diving, Emergency Medical Technician. Fire Academy, Leadership & Communications, Missions, and Technical Rescue.

IBLP does not offer any similar structured programs for young adult women, nor does it offer any programs for young girls similar to Girl Scouts or the more Christian-oriented American Heritage Girls.

=== Former Programs ===
Although some of the materials are still available through IBLP's online store, the programs below have been discontinued or are no longer actively promoted by the organization.

==== Seminars ====
From inception through Gothard's departure from IBLP, the organization centered its activities around the Basic Seminar, which was its introductory program. In 2020 the organization reported that more than 2.5 million people had taken the Basic Seminar. The Basic Seminar was endorsed by Mike Huckabee.

Gothard taught the material in the Basic Seminar, which was offered as a live event in larger metro areas, and via videotape in others. The material could not at that time be purchased from IBLP; it could only be obtained by actual attendance at the Basic Seminar, and IBLP discouraged sharing the material with others who had not attended it. Originally, once a person attended a Basic Seminar, they could attend future sessions free of charge for life.

The Advanced Seminar built upon the teachings in the Basic Seminar and could only be attended by those who were "alumni" of the Basic Seminar. Like the Basic Seminar, the materials could only be obtained by actual attendance; unlike the Basic Seminar, it was not free of charge after first attendance. Gothard was the primary teacher for the Advanced Seminar, joined by Jim Sammons (a Fort Worth-based businessman more notable within IBLP for teaching the Financial Freedom Seminar) and Gary Fraley (a former pastor who died in 2020).

The Basic and Advanced Seminars were discontinued as in-person events after Gothard's departure from the organization. Videotapes of the Basic and Advanced Seminars can now be watched on IBLP's Embassy Media platform (which requires a monthly subscription), and the materials are available for purchase through IBLP's online store.

Other seminars offered included one on Anger Resolution and the Financial Freedom Seminar. These programs were designed for personal or group study; unlike the Basic and Advanced Seminars, these programs were made available for purchase from IBLP without attendance at either Seminar. The material, though no longer actively promoted, remains available for purchase.

==== Advanced Training Institute ====
The Advanced Training Institute (ATI, also sometimes called the Advanced Training Institute of America or ATIA) was the IBLP's homeschool curriculum; it began operations in 1984 and was originally composed of 54 pamphlets called "Wisdom Booklets" based on the Sermon on the Mount.

To enroll in ATI, a family had to have attended both the Basic and Advanced Seminars and meet other requirements (ATI curriculum was not available to the general public for use by other homeschool families). According to its website, ATI ceased to be an "enrollment program" in 2021. Of the original 54 booklets, 15 are now available for purchase by the general public from IBLP's online store.

==== Medical Training Institute of America ====
IBLP previously provided "medical advice" through the Medical Training Institute of America (MTIA). MTIA issued pamphlets called "Basic Care Bulletins" (similar to ATI's Wisdom Booklets) that were heavy on spiritual advice but lacked virtually any actual medical advice. In his very first pamphlet, Gothard suggested that a patient be allowed to speak with former patients of their doctor having similar conditions (most certainly a violation of HIPAA) and suggested that doctors use prior x-rays ("to avoid unnecessary rads", even though the physical condition likely changed in the interim).

One of the more interesting aspects of MTIA was Gothard's heavy emphasis on the issue of "constipation", leading one critic to ask "[w]ill God's judgment be thwarted by a regular helping of shredded wheat every morning?"

Sometime after 2002 (when a book critical of IBLP generally and MTIA specifically was originally published), IBLP discontinued MTIA, and it no longer appears on its website, nor are the "Basic Care Bulletins" offered for sale.

== Leadership ==
Since its inception IBLP has been led by a board of directors. However, during Gothard's tenure as IBLP president, Gothard essentially ran the organization (with the board merely approving whatever decisions he made, even to the point of allowing him to return after the 1980 scandal involving him and his brother) until his resignation from the organization in 2014 (followed by his permanent removal). Outside of one (unconfirmed) report that he attempted to reclaim his position shortly thereafter, Gothard has not had any involvement with the organization since his removal.

The current board consists of four members, all males and all white: Tim Levendusky (who serves as president and has since 2014), Gil Bates (an IBLP alum, who like the Duggar family has a large family, and briefly had a show on TLC as well), David York, and John Bechtle.

== Allegations and investigations ==
A number of former adherents of IBLP programs have called the organization and/or associated circles a cult. At least one blog, Recovering Grace, features testimonies from people formerly involved with IBLP.

According to Chicago magazine, "Real-world consequences at IBLP [for those who failed to "follow the rules"] included scolding, intense counseling, demotions, and even being kicked out altogether."

Christian apologetics groups have reported on IBLP/Gothard in the past. Personal Freedom Outreach (PFO) wrote several articles in its now discontinued Quarterly Journal, some of which are available on its website, and all of which can be purchased as part of a package containing all prior Journal articles. Midwest Christian Outreach (MCOI) reported extensively on IBLP and Gothard's teachings and operations; a four-part series titled "Bill Gothard's Evangelical Talmud" (along with other articles) would ultimately lead to MCOI founders Don and Joy Veinot (along with senior researcher Ron Henzel) to write a book in 2002, A Matter of Basic Principles (re-released in 2023 with some updated information), providing a history of the organization, attempts by it (and others) to correct Gothard's errant teachings, and examples of hypocritical and abusive behavior by Gothard. Veinot has also stated that Gothard's charismatic leadership style, authoritarian control, isolation of members, severe punishments, and demand for absolute and blind loyalty make IBLP "cult-like".

Christian singer Steve Taylor wrote "I Manipulate" (from his album On the Fritz) which was critical of Gothard and his beliefs. The song references both the original chisel and updated umbrella diagrams in the Basic Seminar, along with the original binder format used.

On October 20, 2015, a civil lawsuit alleging a sex-abuse coverup involving several minors was filed in DuPage County, Illinois, against IBLP and its board of directors. Gretchen Wilkinson et al. vs. Institute in Basic Life Principles and William W. Gothard Jr. was brought on behalf of five female plaintiffs to "seek redress and damages for personal injuries based on the negligent and willful and wanton acts and omissions of the defendants with regard to sexual abuse and sexual harassment and similar allegations of malfeasance suffered by the plaintiffs." "Besides monetary damages, they have asked a DuPage County judge to bar IBLP leaders from alleged plans to liquidate resources estimated at more than $100 million while they close the institute's headquarters near Oak Brook and relocate to Texas, the lawsuit states." Five additional accusers joined the suit in January 2016, and more in February 2016, bringing the total of complainants to 16 women and two men. The case was voluntarily dismissed on February 26, 2018, due to statute of limitations. (Gothard later attempted to seek reimbursement for attorney's fees, claiming that the dismissal amounted to him being the "prevailing party" in the suit; his request was denied.)

Amazon Prime Video debuted the limited series Shiny Happy People: Duggar Family Secrets in June 2023. The series centers on the Duggar family's connections with the IBLP but also mentions the scandals surrounding it.
