= Bill Gothard =

American Christian leader (born 1934)

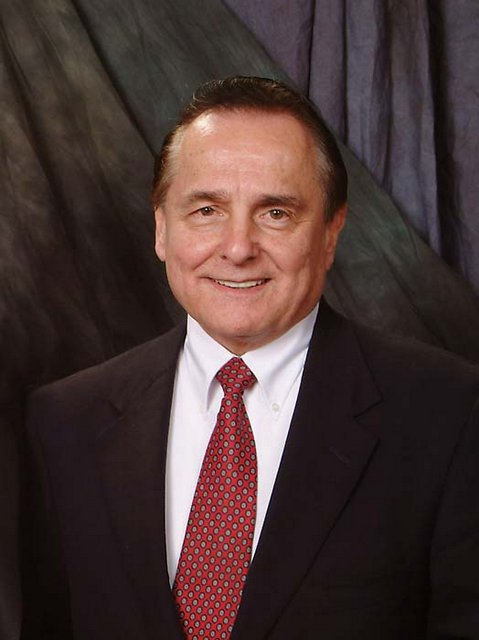
- Bill Gothard (2002, age 67)
- Born: November 2, 1934 (age 92); Hinsdale, Illinois, U.S.
- Occupations: Instructor, author
- Known for: Founding the Institute in Basic Life Principles
- Website: BillGothard.com

William W. Gothard Jr. (born November 2, 1934) is an American Christian minister, speaker, and writer, and the founder of the Institute in Basic Life Principles (IBLP), an independent fundamentalist Christian organization. His conservative teachings encourage Bible memorization, large families, homeschooling, aversion to debt, familial patriarchy, the submission of wives to husbands, and modest attire.

At the height of Gothard's popularity during the 1970s and 80s, his Basic Youth Conflicts seminar which became the Basic and Advanced Seminars were regularly filling auditoriums throughout the United States and beyond with attendance figures as large as ten thousand and more for a one-week seminar. In this way, he reached many in the evangelical community. Other seminars during this time included events for pastors, physicians, and legislators.

In 2014, he stepped down from IBLP after 34 women accused him of sexual harassment and molestation, with some incidents allegedly occurring when the victims were minors. In 2016, Gothard and IBLP were sued by a group of alleged victims. The lawsuit was dismissed in 2018, as the statute of limitations had been exceeded.

== Biography ==
Bill Gothard received his BA in biblical studies from Wheaton College, 1957 and then his MA in Christian education in 1961. He completed his Ph.D. in biblical studies at Louisiana Baptist University in 2004.

In 1961, Gothard started Campus Teams, an organization which changed its name to the Institute in Basic Youth Conflicts (IBYC) in 1974. The organization's name changed again in 1989 to the Institute in Basic Life Principles (IBLP), of which Gothard was the president and a board member until his resignation in 2014.

In 1984, Gothard founded the Advanced Training Institute (ATI), a homeschooling program with a curriculum based on the Sermon on the Mount.

Gothard had many political connections with Republican political leaders, including Mike Huckabee, Sonny Perdue, and Sarah Palin. His ministry was also popular with the reality TV Duggar family and others. He has never married.

== Teaching ==
Gothard's primary teaching, his "Basic Seminar", focuses on what he refers to as seven "Basic Life Principles". He teaches that these principles are universal, and that people will suffer consequences for violating them. Gothard's principles are called Design, Authority, Responsibility, Suffering, Ownership, Freedom, and Success.

The "umbrella of authority" is the idea that in order to be protected from the devil, one must have absolute obedience to those above them in the chain of authority.

Gothard teaches that dating is morally dangerous and that courtship is the better alternative. Gothard encourages parents to be involved in their children's courtship, and that a father should be involved in his daughter's relationships, and should at the very least have the right to say "no" when a man asks to marry his daughter. Gothard also advocates conservative dress. Gothard's teachings discourage dating and syncopated music, including Christian rock. He has warned that Cabbage Patch dolls are idolatrous.

Gothard has been the subject of much debate in Christian circles, and occasionally in mass media. Various books and articles have challenged Gothard's teachings on legalism, law, and grace, and questioned his handling of the IBLP ministry.

== Sexual harassment allegations ==
On February 27, 2014, the board of directors of the Institute in Basic Life Principles placed Gothard on indefinite administrative leave while it investigated claims that he sexually harassed several female employees and volunteers. No criminal activity was uncovered, but an investigation found that Gothard had acted in an "inappropriate manner". The claims had been publicized on the Recovering Grace website, which is a support group for former followers of Gothard's teachings. As many as 34 women who worked for Gothard have claimed that he harassed them. Gothard denied the allegations and admitted no wrongdoing but announced his resignation from the Institute in order "to listen to those who have ought [sic] against him". In a 2014 statement, he apologized for “holding of hands, hugs, and touching of feet or hair with young ladies,” admitting that his actions “crossed the boundaries of discretion…and violated a trust,” but argued that they were not intended to be sexual.

On June 17, 2014, IBLP issued a statement, summarizing the investigation conducted by "outside legal counsel". They asserted that although no criminal activity was uncovered, Gothard had acted in an "inappropriate manner" and so "is not permitted to serve in any counseling, leadership, or Board role within the IBLP ministry". In July 2015, Gothard re-launched his website, and stated that the women who claimed he had harassed and abused them were “not telling the truth." It also included testimonials from several women who had long known him and who had never been sexually harassed.

In 2016, Gothard and IBLP were sued by a group of alleged victims who accused him of sexual harassment and assault. The plaintiffs voluntarily dismissed their lawsuit in 2018, citing "unique complexities" with the statute of limitations, but emphasized: "We are not recanting our experiences or dismissing the incalculable damage that we believe Gothard has done." In 2022, three of the alleged victims added that they withdrew the lawsuit because of "a threatened countersuit and the high emotional toll and revictimization through the lawsuit process which was keenly felt. This caused key plaintiffs (ones still within the Statutes of Limitations) to drop out, affecting the case as a whole.”

In 2025, the Texas Supreme Court ruled that another lawsuit against Gothard and IBLP could proceed. Two women alleged that from about 1996 to 2011 they were subjected to sexual abuse from family members/friends and that Gothard and IBLP were involved in the civil conspiracy regarding the abuse.

== Books ==
- Advanced Seminar Textbook. Institute in Basic Life Principles, 1986, ISBN 0-916888-11-8
- Basic Preparation for Engagement. Institute in Basic Youth Conflicts, 1971
- Basic Seminar Textbook. Institute in Basic Life Principles, 1979, ISBN 0-916888-05-3
- Institute in Basic Youth Conflicts: Research in Principles of Life. Institute in Basic Youth Conflicts, 1981, ISBN 0-916888-05-3
- Men's Manual, Vol. 1. Institute in Basic Youth Conflicts, 1979, ISBN 0-916888-04-5
- Men's Manual, Vol. 2. Institute in Basic Life Principles, 1983, ISBN 0-916888-09-6
- Nuestro Dios Celoso/Our Jealous God: El Amor que no me deja ir/The love that doesn't let me go. Editorial Unilit 2004, ISBN 0-7899-1215-5
- Our Jealous God. Life Change Books, 2003. ISBN 1-59052-225-7
- Rebuilder's Guide. Institute in Basic Youth Conflicts, 1982. ISBN 0-916888-06-1
- Research in Principles of Life: Advanced Seminar Textbook. Institute in Basic Youth Conflicts 1986. ISBN 0-916888-11-8
- Rewards of Being Reviled. Life Change Books, 2004. ISBN 0-916888-30-4
- Self-Acceptance. Institute in Basic Youth Conflicts, 1984. ASIN B0007270AO
- The Amazing Way. Institute in Basic Life Principles, 2010. ISBN 978-0916888497
- The Power of Crying Out. Life Change Books, 2002, ISBN 1-59052-037-8
- The Power of Spoken Blessings. Life Change Books, 2004. ISBN 1-59052-375-X
- The Sevenfold Power of First Century Churches and Homes. Life Change Books, 2000. ISBN 0-916888-18-5
- Why Did God Let It Happen? Institute in Basic Life Principles, 2011. ISBN 978-0-916888-54-1
