= Howard Books =

Christian publishing company

- Parent company: Simon & Schuster
- Founded: 1969 as Howard Publishing
- Founder: Alton Howard
- Country of origin: United States
- Headquarters location: Brentwood, Tennessee
- Publication types: Books
- Official website: www.simonandschuster.com

Howard Books (formerly Howard Publishing) is a Christian publishing company founded in 1969 by Alton Howard and previously based in West Monroe, Louisiana, but which relocated to Brentwood, Tennessee, in September 2009. Howard Books publishes inspirational content.

== History ==
Author and hymn writer, Alton Howard, was very influential in the musical traditions of the churches of Christ since the 1960s. He started Howard Publishing from his home with a hymnal he titled Songs of the Church. With the success of that hymnal, he went on to publish another hymnal titled Songs of Faith and Praise. It is still in print today and used worldwide.

In 1990, Alton's son, John, took over the company and grew it from a hymnal company to a publishing company that published all genres of works.

In 2006, Howard Publishing was bought by Simon & Schuster. The company underwent a subtle name change from Howard Publishing to Howard Books. John served as Executive Vice President of Howard Books. He and his team continued to work for the company until 2009 when the company moved to Nashville. Upon the move, Jonathan Merkh was the Executive Vice President and Publisher of Howard Books, in charge of direction and publication.

Howard Books publishes titles on various aspects of Christian living. In addition to Christian bestseller lists, Howard Books has had multiple titles on the New York Times bestseller list by authors such as Karen Kingsbury, various members of Duck Dynasty's Robertson family, Jay Sekulow, Charles Stanley, Allison Pataki, Tim Conway, Dave Ramsey, Frank Peretti, Brad Paisley, Katie Davis, Rick Warren, and Laura Schroff.
