= 19 Kids and Counting =

American reality television show

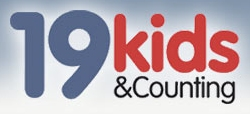
- Also known as: 17 Kids and Counting (2008–2009); 18 Kids and Counting (2009)
- Genre: Reality
- Starring: The Duggar family
- Country of origin: United States
- Original language: English
- No. of seasons: 10
- No. of episodes: 229 (plus specials) (list of episodes)

Production
- Executive producers: Bill Hayes; Deanie Wilcher; Kirk Streb
- Camera setup: Multiple
- Running time: 17–44 minutes
- Production company: Figure 8 Films

Original release
- Network: TLC
- Release: September 29, 2008 – May 19, 2015

19 Kids and Counting (formerly 17 Kids and Counting and 18 Kids and Counting) is an American reality television series that aired on the cable channel TLC for seven years until its cancellation in 2015. The show features the Duggar family: parents Michelle and Jim Bob Duggar and their 19 children – nine daughters and ten sons – all of whose names begin with the letter "J". During the duration of the show, two children were born, three children were married, and four grandchildren were born.

The show focuses on the life of the Duggar family, who are devout independent Baptists, and frequently discusses values of purity, modesty and faith in God. The Duggars avoid birth control, saying they have decided to allow God to determine the number of children they have. All of the children are homeschooled, and access to entertainment, such as movies and television, is limited. They practice chaperoned courtship, in which a couple becomes acquainted only in a group setting.

The values presented on the show have been associated with the Quiverfull movement, which has been described as promoting strict family conformity, male hierarchies and subservient roles for women. The Duggars have stated that they are not associated with the Quiverfull movement. However, in an article formerly published on their website titled "Why Have Such a Large Family?", the Duggars reference Psalms 127:3–5, from which the Quiverfull movement name comes. Moreover, in 2001, Jim Bob and Michelle were interviewed for an article published on a Quiverfull affiliated website. The Duggar family has also been connected with the Institute in Basic Life Principles and the Advanced Training Institute, both of which were founded by Bill Gothard.

The series began on September 29, 2008, and concluded on May 19, 2015. The show was TLC's most popular, averaging 2.3 million viewers per new episode in Season 10 and scoring in the Nielsen "Cable Top 25".

On May 22, 2015, TLC suspended the series when the Duggars' eldest son Josh publicly apologized for having "acted inexcusably" following reports that he molested five girls, including some of his sisters, by fondling them. These events occurred in 2002 and 2003, when Josh was 14 to 15 years old and prior to the beginning of the show. On July 16, 2015, TLC announced that the show was officially canceled and would not resume production. A spin off show, Counting On, aired in December 2015 and was cancelled in 2021, due to Josh Duggar's arrest for child pornography. Another Duggar son, Joseph, was arrested for child molestation in 2026.

== Background ==
The Duggars live in Tontitown, Arkansas, near Springdale and originally appeared in several TLC and Discovery Health one hour specials, mostly focused on four of Michelle's last five deliveries. Jim Bob Duggar has an older sister, Deanna, who occasionally appears on the show. Michelle Duggar (née Ruark) has six older siblings (Pamela Ethel, Kathie Ann, Evelyn Alice, Carolyn Jeannite, Freda Louise, and Garrett Floyd Jr.). The couple met in the early 1980s when Duggar and a fellow church member were sent for a follow-up visit after Michelle experienced a religious conversion. The Duggars were married on July 21, 1984, just after Michelle's high school graduation. When they married, she was 17 and he was 19; neither attended college. Together they first launched a used-car business, then towing and real estate businesses; both are licensed real estate agents.

The Duggars initially chose to wait before having children and used birth control pills in the early years of their marriage. Their eldest child, Joshua, was born in 1988. They resumed using oral contraceptives after his birth, but conceived again, despite this precaution; however, Michelle miscarried early in her pregnancy. She has mentioned that they named this child Caleb, despite not knowing the baby's sex. After consulting a doctor, the Duggars were told that birth control can (in some cases) allow conception, but cause miscarriage. As a result, they decided to stop using birth control and allow God to determine the number of children they would have. Michelle soon became pregnant again, this time with her first set of twins, Jana and John-David. Michelle gave birth 17 times, over a period of 21 1/2 years, approximately one birth every 15 months.

The high number of children is partly related to their Fundamental Baptist beliefs that prohibit contraception. They only watch programs they consider to be wholesome family television and various historical events. Their Internet service is filtered. They adhere to certain standards of modesty in clothing, in accordance with their religious beliefs. Shorts and tank tops are prohibited, and the women do not wear skirts that go above the knee. According to Michelle Duggar, such standards are mandated by scripture. They believe that baring one's thigh is "nakedness and shame" and runs the risk of "defrauding" others – or stirring up and arousing "desires in someone else that cannot be righteously fulfilled". They avoid beaches and public swimming areas "because it's just too hard for the guys to try to keep their eyes averted in those situations". Female family members keep their hair long, and males are clean-shaven and short-haired. They practice chaperoned courtship, where the couple gets to know each other in a group setting. The Duggars describe this as "dating with a purpose". The Duggar children cannot begin a courtship without parental permission. Before a courtship officially begins, an interested man must speak to the woman's father.

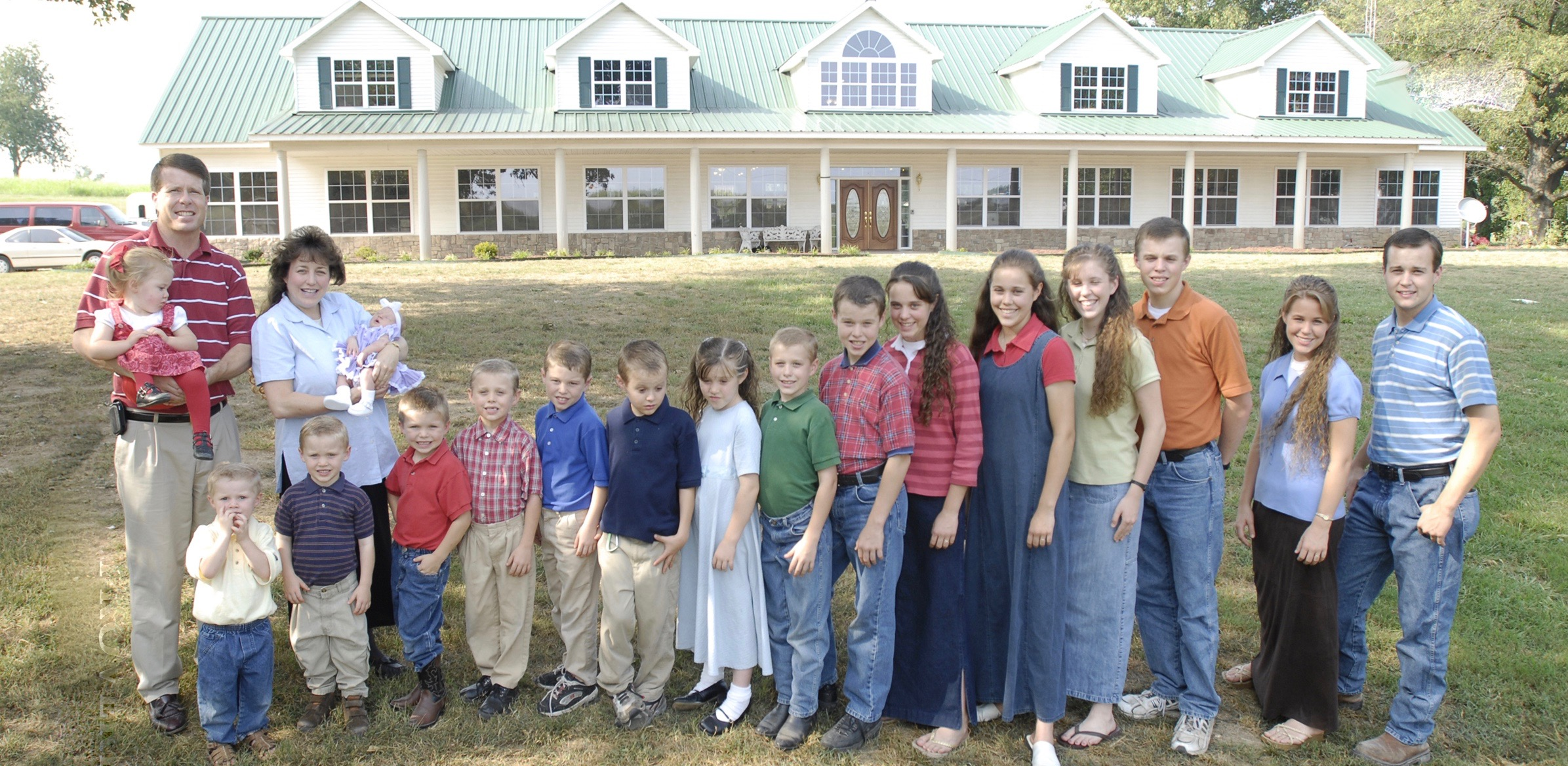
The Duggars in 2007

Jim Bob Duggar served as a Republican member of the Arkansas House of Representatives from 1999 to 2002. He was defeated for the Republican nomination for the U.S. Senate by incumbent Tim Hutchinson in 2002 by a vote of 71,576 to 20,546. He later became a real estate agent and investor. The Duggars' income is derived from rental proceeds of commercial properties they own. Prior to the scandal surrounding son Josh, they lived debt-free.

Construction of their 7000-square-foot house began in 2000, when they bought the lot and ordered two steel frames. One of the frames was not drilled correctly, so the Duggars received a third frame, which was used to build the girls' room and the industrial kitchen. Discovery Networks completed the build, finding local Arkansas construction workers to donate their skills and time. The home was completed on January 20, 2006. Some of the painting, decorating, furnishings, appliances, and other finishing touches (such as a stocked pantry) were provided by Discovery Networks and corporate sponsors, as part of the one-hour television special entitled 16 Children and Moving In.

But there were longstanding questions about the way "19 Kids and Counting" (...) were able to skirt child labor laws because they were classified as documentaries. A 2010 investigation by The Times revealed that producers of "19 Kids and Counting" and other reality TV programs had not obtained work permits to employ minors under 16. Patriarch Jim Bob Duggar said at the time the family didn't consider the filming to be work. (...) And the questions go beyond labor law. As children, the Duggars' offspring were conscripted into a reality show that stripped them of their privacy and anonymity, all in service of their parents' extreme religious beliefs.

== Series overview ==
Season	Episodes	Originally released	
Season	Episodes	First released	Last released
1	10	September 29, 2008	November 10, 2008
2	20	January 25, 2009	June 23, 2009
3	28	June 30, 2009	December 22, 2009
4	38	January 31, 2010	November 30, 2010
5	33	January 24, 2011	November 8, 2011
6	26	February 14, 2012	October 30, 2012
7	21	April 2, 2013	October 22, 2013
8	12	April 1, 2014	June 3, 2014
9	17	September 2, 2014	November 25, 2014
10	22	February 17, 2015	May 19, 2015

== Events during the series ==
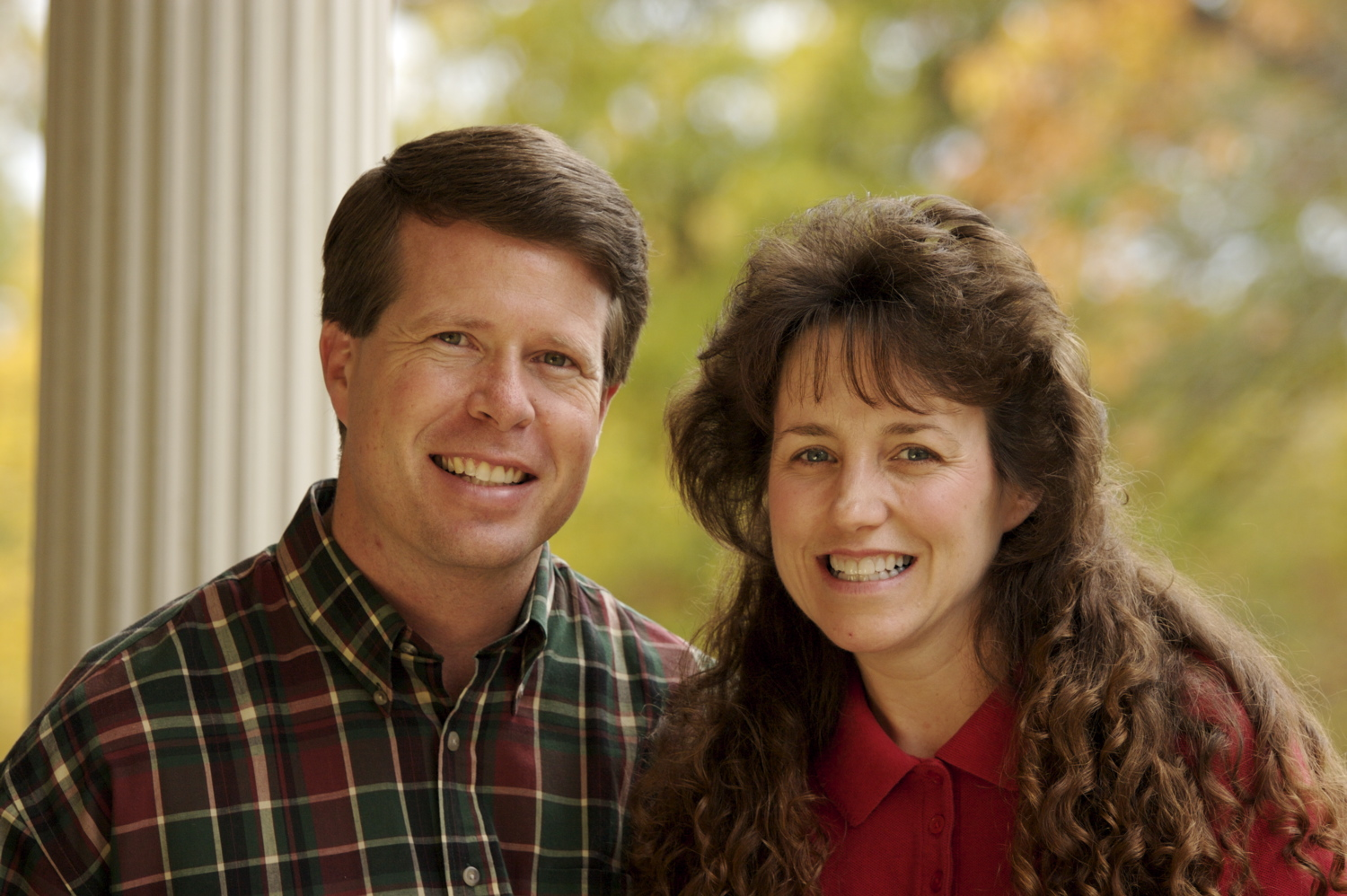
Jim Bob and Michelle Duggar

Michelle Duggar gave birth via emergency C-section to the couple's 19th child, Josie Brooklyn Duggar, on December 10, 2009, six months into her pregnancy. When she was rushed to the hospital for gallstones, doctors discovered that she was pre-eclamptic and performed an emergency delivery. Josie was premature at only 1 lb, 6 oz at birth. Nearly four months later on April 6, 2010, the Duggars were able to take the baby to their temporary rental home in Little Rock while they awaited medical approval to take her home to Tontitown.

The Duggars took Josie home to Tontitown for good on June 23, 2010. By that December she weighed 15 lbs 12 oz.

On December 2, 2008, Jim Bob and Michelle Duggar's book The Duggars: 20 and Counting! was released. Their second book, A Love That Multiplies, was released on June 7, 2011. The eldest four girls – Jana, Jill, Jessa and Jinger – authored Growing Up Duggar: It's All About Relationships, which was released on March 4, 2014.

On November 8, 2011, Michelle Duggar and the family appeared on NBC's Today Show to announce she was expecting their 20th child. On December 8, 2011, the Duggars announced that Michelle had miscarried 20 weeks into her pregnancy. Six days later, they held a memorial service for the stillborn baby girl that they named Jubilee Shalom (meaning celebration and peace).

A few months after the birth of their daughter Mackynzie, Josh and Anna Duggar learned that she was pregnant with their second child, but the pregnancy ended in a miscarriage. On their daughter's first birthday, Josh and Anna Duggar announced they were expecting again. The couple welcomed their second child, Michael James, on June 15, 2011. They learned that they were expecting again in September 2012.

Josh Duggar was offered a job at the Family Research Council during his wife's pregnancy with their third child. Marcus Anthony was delivered by a midwife on June 2, 2013. Duggar announced that he was hired to be the executive director of the Family Research Council's political action committee, FRC Action, on June 18, 2013, and that the family would move to Washington, D.C.

On December 2, 2014, Josh and Anna Duggar announced they were expecting their fourth child.

The Duggars issued an announcement that Jessa Duggar was in a courtship with Ben Seewald on September 18, 2013. The couple met through their church. On August 15, 2014, after eleven months of courtship, the couple announced their engagement and were married on November 1, 2014.

Jill Duggar's courtship with Derick Dillard was announced on March 31, 2014. They were introduced by Jim Bob Duggar and became further acquainted via supervised Skype and text conversations while Dillard was serving as a missionary in Nepal. Jill Duggar and her father traveled to Nepal to meet Dillard in person and began a formal courtship in November 2013. The couple announced their engagement on April 9, 2014, and were married on June 21, 2014.

The Dillards announced their first pregnancy on August 20, 2014. Their son, Israel David Dillard, was born on April 6, 2015.

The Seewalds announced their first pregnancy on April 21, 2015, having waited until the second trimester.

On July 16, 2015, TLC announced that the series was officially canceled.

== Reception ==
Arnold Hamilton of The Dallas Morning News described 19 Kids and Counting as "part Little House on the Prairie, part Yours, Mine & Ours–except the only blending in this real-life family occurs with restaurant like precision at mealtimes". He described the Duggars as acting "against the trend", considering the 2002 US Census found that only 0.3 percent of women aged 15 to 44 have given birth to seven or more children and that this number has declined steadily since 1976.

In an op-ed for The New York Observer, Nina Burleigh described the Duggars as "good TV. Good, sugarcoated rat poison, politically speaking", referring to the Duggars' political activity such as their opposition to abortion and their lobbying efforts against legislation that would allow transgender people to use public restrooms matching their gender identity.

In an article published in the Journal of Religion and Popular Culture, Christy Mesaros-Winckles described the Duggars as "unofficial spokespeople for the Quiverfull movement". Referring to the first season of the show, Mesaros-Winckles said that the Duggars introduced themselves and their religious beliefs with the "subtle and disturbing" message of conformity and "rigid male hierarchy" associated with the Quiverfull movement. Mesaros-Winckles asserted that the show provides a platform for the legitimization of this movement, while downplaying "patriarchal gender roles and strict family conformity". Mesaros-Winckles also said that the Duggars "try to convince the audience that their way of life is best for raising healthy, godly children" and that a large family is a "biblical mandate". She concluded that, despite the small size of the Quiverfull movement, with perhaps only several thousand followers, the show 19 Kids and Counting has brought the movement to the forefront of American culture.

Feminist Amanda Marcotte referred to the Duggars as part of the "Christian patriarchy movement", which she described as interchangeable with the Quiverfull movement, saying that the Duggars promote sexist values which run counter to mainstream American culture. The Duggars have said they are not part of the Quiverfull movement, stating, "We are simply Bible-believing Christians who desire to follow God's Word and apply it to our lives."

=== Criticism ===
The Duggar family has received criticism due to their stance on LGBT issues. In August 2014, Michelle Duggar recorded a political robocall regarding legislation affecting transgender individuals, which The Huffington Post described as "transphobic" and The Washington Post described as "anti-anti-discrimination". The robocall includes Michelle saying, "The Fayetteville City Council is voting on an ordinance this Tuesday night that would allow men – yes, I said men – to use women's and girls' restrooms, locker rooms, showers, sleeping areas and other areas that are designated for females only. I don't believe the citizens of Fayetteville would want males with past child predator convictions that claim they are female to have a legal right to enter private areas that are reserved for women and girls." In response to this robocall, a petition was started on Change.org calling for TLC to cancel the show 19 Kids and Counting, which received over 100,000 signatures. In response to the first petition, a second petition was started asking TLC to keep the show on the air, which also received over 100,000 signatures.

In November 2014, the Duggars asked married couples to take a picture while kissing and share it on their Facebook page. Several users noted that pictures of same-sex couples were deleted from the Duggars' Facebook page. While working for the Family Research Council, the Duggars' eldest son Josh Duggar said, "I truly believe every child deserves a mother and a father"; the Family Research Council has been labeled as an anti-gay hate group by the Southern Poverty Law Center, with SPLC saying they were designated as such due to their publication of "anti-gay propaganda". Josh Duggar has been described as an "anti-gay activist" by GLAAD.

"19 Kids and Counting" also regularly documented the Duggars at events organized by the group in ways that omitted key information: For instance, episodes featuring commencement ceremonies from Alert Academy, an IBLP-led quasi-boot camp, never mention that the program denounces homosexuality and endorses the use of "loving corporal correction" on children. (...) The Duggars are associated with the Biblical patriarchy movement, which holds that men are ordained by God to be the leaders of their households and strongly discourages birth control. (...) "19 Kids" and "Counting On" made it seem like "it's quirky and zany to run a household with that many children," says Kathryn Joyce, author of "Quiverfull: Inside the Christian Patriarchy Movement," when in reality older girls are often forced to serve as co-parents to the detriment of things like their education. Once the Duggar girls reached adulthood, there were few options available to them other than marriage, kids and reality TV.

In January 2023, Jinger Duggar Vuolo, the sixth child of Jim Bob and Michelle Duggar who appeared on both "19 Kids and Counting" and its spinoff "Counting On", would criticize her family's "cult-like" religious beliefs, telling People Magazine things like "Fear was a huge part of my childhood," "I thought I had to wear only skirts and dresses to please God. Music with drums, places I went or the wrong friendships could all bring harm" and that "the teaching I grew up under was harmful, it was damaging, and there are lasting effects. Vuolo also provided more criticism of the Duggar family in her book Becoming Free Indeed: My Story of Disentangling Faith From Fear.

== Sex offense cases of the Duggar children ==
=== Josh Duggar ===
On May 21, 2015, a police report from 2006 was revealed to the public by In Touch Weekly magazine, stating sexual molestation allegations against the Duggars' eldest son, Josh Duggar. The report states that, in 2002–2003, Josh – then 14 to 15 years old – fondled five girls, including four of his sisters, by touching their breasts and genital regions on multiple occasions while they were asleep and on a few occasions while they were awake. These events occurred prior to the beginning of the TLC series. The case was never fully investigated, and the statute of limitations had by then expired. On May 22, 2015, TLC removed all reruns of the show that were previously set to air from its current airing schedule, with the statement, "We are deeply saddened and troubled by this heartbreaking situation and our thoughts and prayers are with the family and victims at this difficult time."

In the wake of the controversy, more than twenty advertisers, including General Mills, Walgreens, Payless ShoeSource, Choice Hotels, Pizza Hut, Sweet Leaf Tea and Crayola, announced that they were pulling their ads from the show; Hulu also removed the show's entire back catalog of episodes from its streaming service. Public reaction to the revelation led to several petitions calling for TLC to cancel the series on Change.org, citing conflict between the reported events and the show's promotion of family values.

Josh, along with his wife and his parents, responded to the revelations. Josh apologized, stating he had "acted inexcusably" and resigned from his position at the Family Research Council. Anna stated that she knew about Josh's actions two years before she married him and believed that the counseling he received after the incidents "changed his life". The Duggars described this time as a dark period in their lives and said it caused their family "to seek God like never before". They were featured in an interview with Megyn Kelly on Fox News Channel's The Kelly File on June 3, 2015, where they answered questions regarding the scandal.

On April 29, 2021, six years after the show's cancellation, Josh was arrested for possession of child pornography and later convicted.

=== Joseph Duggar ===
On March 18, 2026, Joseph Duggar was arrested for "lewd and lascivious behavior", including molestation of a victim younger than 12, regarding an incident in 2020 with a then 9-year-old girl in Panama City Beach, Florida during a family vacation. Four days later, Arkansas police arrested Joseph's wife Kendra Duggar on an unrelated case of child abuse charges. She was charged with four counts of endangering the welfare of a minor and four counts of false imprisonment.

== Cancellation ==
On July 16, 2015, Discovery Communications, parent company of TLC, confirmed to CNN that the show was officially canceled and that all further production would be ceased. In the wake of the allegations, the network announced that it would produce a one-hour, commercial-free documentary special on child abuse, which would include Jill and Jessa Duggar.

TLC had paid the Duggar family an estimated $25,000–$45,000 per episode. One branding expert estimated that the loss of endorsements, speaking engagements and book deals based on the show could cost the Duggars an estimated $25 million a year.

A three-part spin-off series, Jill and Jessa: Counting On, focusing on newlyweds Jill and Derick Dillard, Jessa and Ben Seewald, Anna Duggar and several of the other adult Duggar children (sans Josh) aired in December 2015. Its first episode attracted more than 2.2 million viewers, according to a report by The Nielsen Company. The third episode garnered the highest ratings and viewership, at 2.5 million viewers, and ranked in the Top 5 cable shows for the night. In March 2016, it was announced that Counting On had been picked up for a full season, which premiered on March 15, 2016.

== Cast ==
The Duggar family includes parents James Robert "Jim Bob" Duggar and Michelle Duggar (née Ruark), and children Josh, Jana, John, Jill, Jessa, Jinger, Joseph (Joe), Josiah, Joy, Jedidiah, Jeremiah, Jason, James, Justin, Jackson, Johannah, Jennifer, Jordyn, and Josie.

== Availability ==
=== DVDs ===
Title	Region 1	Discs
Season 1	2009	2
Season 2	February 23, 2010	3
Season 3	April 27, 2010 & March 13, 2012	3
Season 4	April 5, 2011 and April 17, 2012	4
Season 5	May 1, 2012	4
