= KOLL =

Coordinates: 34.602°N 91.861°W

- Lonoke, Arkansas; United States
- Broadcast area: Little Rock metropolitan area
- Frequency: 106.3 MHz
- Branding: La Zeta

Programming
- Format: Regional Mexican

Ownership
- Owner: Edward & Leticia Vega; (La Zeta 95.7 Inc.)

History
- First air date: 1982 (as KWTD)
- Former call signs: KWTD (1981–1982); KWTD-FM (1982–1990); KMZX (1990–1998); KKYK-FM (1998); KHTE (1998–2000); KLEC-FM (2000–2004)

Technical information
- Licensing authority: FCC
- Facility ID: 38392
- Class: C2
- ERP: 50,000 watts
- HAAT: 150 meters

Links
- Public license information: Public file; LMS

KOLL-FM (106.3 FM, "La Zeta 106.3 FM") is a radio station licensed in Lonoke, Arkansas, broadcasting to the Little Rock, Arkansas, area. KOLL airs Regional Mexican music format. La Zeta is the only full size Spanish station in central Arkansas, their studios are located in West Little Rock, and the transmitter tower is located near Pettus.

== History ==
Prior to their current format, the station aired Urban Contemporary format as KWTD in the early 1980s later changing their call letters to KMZX in 1990 with the same format. Later the station was named "The River" and played and All Favorites Hits English Format. Also prior to their current call letters, the station was "KLEC" which featured a modern rock format from the summer of 1998 until the fall of 2004. The station was known as "Lick 1063".

On-air personalities were chosen from the local public through a series of studio interviews, then on-air interviews in a type of sink-or-swim competition of sorts.

The station logo was chosen through an internet poll on their website. Lick 1063 moved around on the radio dial several times, starting out at 101.1 FM in a "format" of a variety of about 35 compact discs, some home-recorded from the head engineer's (Steve Gimbert's) vinyl collection, then to 96.5 FM, when the station adopted a harder sound with groups such as Type O Negative, Marilyn Manson, Rob Zombie, Korn and Pantera.

Later, the format moved to the stronger 106.3 frequency.

Lick 1063 also featured The Corey and Jay Show in morning drive. They were fired when Archway Broadcasting purchased the station from Equity Broadcasting in late 2002. Corey and Jay later moved to KMJX, a classic rock station, replacing Tommy Smith and his long-running "Rock and Roll Breakfast" morning show. They later moved to KDJE.

On September 1, 2012, at Midnight, after playing "Black Velvet" by Alannah Myles, KOLL flipped to a Regional Mexican format branded as "La Zeta 106.3″.
