= KABZ =

- Little Rock, Arkansas; United States
- Broadcast area: Little Rock (Central Arkansas)
- Frequency: 103.7 MHz
- Branding: 103.7 The Buzz

Programming
- Format: Sports
- Affiliations: ESPN Radio

Ownership
- Owner: Signal Media; (Signal Media of Arkansas, Inc.)
- Sister stations: KKPT, KBZU

History
- First air date: June 22, 1961
- Former call signs: KARK-FM (1961–1968); KARN-FM (1968–1973); KKYK (1973–1982); KKYK-FM (1982–1996); KSYG (1996–2000)
- Call sign meaning: Arkansas Buzz

Technical information
- Licensing authority: FCC
- Facility ID: 60134
- Class: C
- ERP: 100,000 watts
- HAAT: 457 meters (1,499 ft)
- Transmitter coordinates: 34°47′56″N 92°29′44″W

Links
- Public license information: Public file; LMS
- Webcast: Listen live
- Website: 1037thebuzz.com

KABZ (103.7 MHz) is a commercial FM radio station in Little Rock, Arkansas. The station is owned by Signal Media and the broadcast license is held by Signal Media of Arkansas, Inc. KABZ airs a sports radio format, known as "103.7 The Buzz." The station's studios are located on Cottondale Lane, just west of downtown along the south shore of the Arkansas River (David D. Terry Lake). The transmitter is located on Shinall Mountain, near the Chenal Valley neighborhood of Little Rock.

On weekdays, KABZ airs local sports shows from 6 a.m. to 7 p.m. Nights and weekends, the station carries the ESPN Radio Network. KATV, Little Rock's ABC Network affiliate, supplies news and weather updates. Some KABZ local sports shows are also heard on other Arkansas sports radio stations.

== History ==
=== Early years ===
On June 22, 1961, the station signed on as KARK-FM, the FM simulcast of KARK (920 AM), one of Little Rock's earliest radio stations. KARK-FM’s effective radiated power was 22,500 watts on a 790-foot tower. KARK-AM-FM were co-owned with KARK-TV, Little Rock's NBC affiliate. In 1967, FM stations in most cities could not simulcast their AM stations full-time any longer per an FCC order; because of this, KARK-FM switched to an automated Top 40 format, using syndicator TM Century's "Stereo Rock" format.

In 1972, a Denver-based company bought KARK-TV. In those days, broadcast stations owned by different companies could not have the same call sign. The TV station has kept the KARK-TV call letters to this day, while the radio stations switched to KARN and KARN-FM. By then, KARN-FM had boosted its power to 95,000 watts and nearly doubled its antenna height to 1510 feet, boasting a signal that could be heard on a good car radio from Fort Smith to Memphis, along the entire I-40 run through Arkansas.

=== Top 40 KKYK ===
In 1973, to carve out its own identity, it switched call letters to KKYK, continuing to run the "Stereo Rock" format for several years as "K-Kick 104." As a top 40 station, KKYK usually finished well behind KLAZ (98.5 FM) and its successor KZOU "Zoo 98." KKYK was the dominant CHR station in the early-to-mid 1980s, but fell behind when KZOU became the more dominant CHR station in the market. During the 1980s, KKYK was an affiliate with American Top 40 with Casey Kasem, while KZOU was an affiliate with Rick Dees Weekly Top 40. Ted Snider, the owner of KARN, sold the FM station to Shepard Communications in late 1988 after members of his family bought an interest in an urban contemporary station, KIPR "Power 92." After Shepard bought it, KKYK dropped the automation, hired a disc jockey staff, and adopted a more major-market sound, overtaking "Zoo 98." It usually finished in the top three behind country music outlet KSSN and either just behind or just in front of beautiful music KEZQ (100.3 FM, now KDJE).

When Top 40/CHR began to falter in the early-1990s, KKYK saw its ratings decline. KZOU was forced out of the format in June 1991, becoming hot AC KURB "B-98.5." While that would normally have been a moment of celebration, KKYK was unable to capitalize on the demise of its competitor. KURB hired KKYK's popular morning man Craig O'Neill away, and KKYK began a steep drop despite its biggest competitor leaving the format.

=== Switch to K-Rock ===
KKYK attempted several reboots of its Top 40 format throughout parts of the 1980s and the 1990s, including an attempt at bringing back the old "K-Kick 104" branding and moving to a so-called "Rock 40" format as "Kick 103.7." None of these steps were successful, and in the summer of 1993, the Top 40 format was jettisoned for album rock as "K-Rock 103.7." "K-Rock" was more successful ratings-wise than the last few years of KKYK's top 40 format, but it struggled to compete against the established rock station, KMJX, then known as "Magic 105." It was also had to deal with a glut of rock stations launching around the same time in the market, including KLPQ/KOUN, which ran a classic rock format.

In 1994, Shepard sold KKYK to Philip Jonsson, owner of Signal Media, which owned KBIS (1010 AM) and KHLT (94.1 FM). Shortly after buying KKYK, Signal Media flipped KHLT from "K-Lite 94.1" to KKPT "94.1 The Point," running a classic rock format. Signal attempted to tag-team its classic rock station, KKPT, with a younger-skewing active rock station, KKYK, to run the other local rock stations out of the format. Although the rock combo had some success in the ratings, it failed to force any major competitors to switch to other formats.

=== The Signal and The Buzz ===
KKYK's fate as a rock station was sealed after Group W bought 1010 AM, by then known as KSYG, to silence it, which would decrease nighttime interference to its own WINS in New York City. In 1996, Jonsson moved the AM station's talk format to 103.7 FM, which assumed the KSYG call letters and became known as "The Signal." After six years as "The Signal," in 2000, it took on the call sign KABZ and became "103.7 The Buzz." During its time as "The Buzz," it aired mostly hot talk and guy talk programming with modern rock in late nights and on the weekends. Eventually, all music programming was discontinued while the talk format remained. In 2004, KABZ took on a sports talk format, at first carrying the Fox Sports Radio Network, and in 2009, switching to ESPN, apart from its local shows.
