= KBZU =

Radio station in Benton–Little Rock, Arkansas

- Benton, Arkansas; United States
- Broadcast area: Little Rock (Central Arkansas)
- Frequency: 106.7 MHz
- Branding: 106.7 The Buz2

Programming
- Format: Sports
- Affiliations: ESPN Radio

Ownership
- Owner: Signal Media; (Signal Media of Arkansas, Inc.)
- Sister stations: KABZ, KKPT

History
- First air date: January 1, 1979
- Former call signs: KAKI (1979–1992); KGKO-FM (1992–1993); KMVK (1993–1997); KDDK (1997–2002); KHKN (2002–2009); KHLR (2009–2020)
- Former frequencies: 107.1 MHz (1979–1993)

Technical information
- Licensing authority: FCC
- Facility ID: 6819
- Class: C2
- ERP: 13,000 watts
- HAAT: 292.7 meters (960 ft)
- Transmitter coordinates: 34°47′56″N 92°29′53″W

Links
- Public license information: Public file; LMS

KBZU (106.7 MHz) is a commercial FM radio station in Little Rock, Arkansas (licensed to suburban Benton, Arkansas in the Little Rock radio market). The station airs a sports radio format and calls itself "106.7 The Buz2". KBZU is owned by Signal Media of Arkansas, Inc. The station's studios and offices are located just west of downtown Little Rock, along the south shore of the Arkansas River (David D. Terry Lake). The transmitter is located on Shinall Mountain, along Two Towers Road, near the Chenal Valley neighborhood of Little Rock.

KBZU is a Class C2 FM station, with an effective radiated power (ERP) of 13,000 watts from a tower 960 feet (292.7 m) in height above average terrain (HAAT).

== History ==
=== Early years at 107.1 ===
On January 1, 1979, the station signed on at 107.1 MHz as KAKI. It was owned by Bridges Broadcasting and was the FM counterpart to KGKO (850 AM, now deleted). The station was a Class A, powered at only 2,500 watts, serving Benton and its adjacent towns, not the larger Little Rock market. While KGKO played oldies, KAKI was separately programmed as a country music station. By the late 1980s, KAKI switched to adult contemporary music.

In 1992, the station changed its call sign to match its AM counterpart, becoming KGKO-FM. It also received a construction permit from the Federal Communications Commission to move to 106.7 MHz, coupled with an increase in power and tower height.

=== Move to 106.7 ===
In 1993, the station was bought by the Southern Skies Corporation for $1.125 million. The new owners finished moving the station to 106.7 on a new tower and relocated the studios and offices to Little Rock. The format returned to country music and the call letters were switched to KMVK, which represented "Maverick."

In 1997, the station was acquired by Clear Channel Communications, now known as iHeartMedia. The station switched its call sign to KDDK and began calling itself "The Wolf." In 2002, its call letters changed again, this time to KHKN, representing the word "Kickin'."

On March 31, 2008, "The Wolf" moved to 105.1 FM (currently KMJX) and KHKN rebranded as "TOM-FM". According to Phil Hunt, regional programming vice-president of Clear Channel, "We're going to call the station Tom FM after Tom Wood and his famous Brown Bagger show."

=== Switch to gospel, rhythmic oldies ===
On August 17, 2009, KHKN swapped formats and call letters with KHLR (94.9 FM). The new KHLR at 106.7 FM flipped to urban contemporary gospel, branded as "Hallelujah FM."

On April 12, 2011, Clear Channel sold the station to Signal Media for $2 million.

On July 19, 2011, at 6 p.m., KHLR changed its format to rhythmic oldies, branded as "Heartbeat 106.7." The first song on "Heartbeat" was "Good Times" by Chic. Although its slogan was billed as "R&B + Old School," its playlist also featured artists from the early days of the Disco/Dance and Rhythmic Pop genres.

=== Return to country music ===
On August 12, 2015 at 5 PM, after playing "Last Dance" by Donna Summer, KHLR flipped to country, branded as "106.7 The Ride". It launched with a "commercial free 10,000 song free ride," beginning with "Kick the Dust Up" by Luke Bryan. The new country format competes with former owner iHeartMedia’s country combo of KSSN and KMJX.

=== The Buz2 ===
On November 13, 2020, morning host Doug Kramer, who had moved from KHKN earlier that year, announced his dismissal from the station, and announced that the rest of the airstaff, including midday host AJ Parker and afternoon host Ashley King, would exit within 30 days; he claimed this was due to financial hardships brought on by the ongoing COVID-19 pandemic.

On December 30, Signal Media announced that the station would flip to sports talk, as a supplemental sister station to KABZ, on January 4, 2021, branded as "106.7 The Buz2", under new call sign KBZU. "The Buz2" will feature the national ESPN Radio lineup, while continuing to serve as home to Arkansas State University football, University of Arkansas-Little Rock men’s basketball and Benton High School football.
