= KDXE =

KDXE may refer to:

- KDXE (FM), a radio station (101.1 FM) licensed to serve Cammack Village, Arkansas, United States
- KZTS (AM), a radio station (1380 AM) licensed to serve North Little Rock, Arkansas, which held the call sign KDXE from 1957 to 1981 and from 2003 to 2018
