= Magic 105 =

Magic 105 may refer to:

- KMJX (105.1 FM), a radio station in Little Rock, Arkansas
- Magic 105 (Northern Ireland), a former pirate "border blaster" radio station broadcasting to Northern Ireland from the Republic of Ireland
