= List of botanical gardens and arboretums in Arkansas =

This list of botanical gardens and arboretums in Arkansas is intended to include all significant botanical gardens and arboretums in the U.S. state of Arkansas

Name	Image	Affiliation	City
Arkansas Arboretum		Pinnacle Mountain State Park	Little Rock
Blue Spring Heritage Center			Eureka Springs
Botanical Garden of the Ozarks			Fayetteville
Garvan Woodland Gardens		University of Arkansas Division of Agriculture	Hot Springs
South Arkansas Arboretum		South Arkansas Community College	El Dorado

== See also ==
- List of botanical gardens and arboretums in the United States
