= KZTS =

KZTS may refer to:

- KZTS (AM), a radio station (1380 AM) licensed to serve North Little Rock, Arkansas, United States
- KDXE (FM), a radio station (101.1 FM) licensed to serve Cammack Village, Arkansas, which held the call sign KZTS from 2009 to 2018
