= KABF =

Coordinates: 34.792°N 92.477°W

- Little Rock, Arkansas; United States
- Broadcast area: Central Arkansas
- Frequency: 88.3 MHz

Programming
- Format: Community

Ownership
- Owner: Arkansas Broadcasting Foundation

History
- First air date: August 31, 1984
- Call sign meaning: Arkansas Broadcasting Foundation

Technical information
- Licensing authority: FCC
- Facility ID: 2772
- Class: C1
- ERP: 100,000 watts
- HAAT: 237 meters (778 ft)

Links
- Public license information: Public file; LMS
- Website: kabf.org

KABF (88.3 FM) is a community radio station in Little Rock, Arkansas, United States. Its nickname is "The Voice of the People" which refers to its populist official mission: to serve middle- and lower-income Arkansans. It broadcasts at 88.3 FM and is an organ of the Arkansas Broadcasting Foundation (hence the call letters ABF).

KABF is non-corporate and non-commercial. Its format is music and talk, with diverse programming. The station went on the air on August 31, 1984. It broadcasts at 100,000 watts from its transmitter at the Shinall Mountain antenna farm, near the city's Chenal Valley neighborhood, and its primary coverage radius is 60 miles. The station is affiliated with the Association of Community Organizations for Reform Now (ACORN) and shares a building with Arkansas Community Organizations' (ACO) office at 2101 South Main Street in Little Rock, Arkansas. Like all public broadcasting, KABF relies on listener contributions for a large part of its operating budget.

Its sister station is KNON in Dallas, Texas.

== Radio Shows ==
- Shoog Radio - initially Cheyenne Matthews, then Aaron Sarlo and Kara Bibb
- Garland’s Backroads - Amy Garland
- PowWow - Amy Pannell
- Not Necessarily Bluegrass - Danny Trawick

== History ==
KABF-FM was founded in the early 1980s as an alternative to the rigid, commercial radio formats that dominated the state's airwaves. Volunteers with Arkansas ACORN aimed to create a station that would offer a platform for diverse genres of music, such as jazz, blues, gospel, reggae, and folk, as well as local artists and community groups. The station's name, KABF, stood for Arkansas Broadcasting Foundation, the entity that held the broadcast license for the station's 100,000-watt signal.

In 1984, with support from various sources, including ACORN, the Roman Catholic Diocese of Little Rock, and the federal government, KABF acquired a secondhand transmitter and began working on its infrastructure. The station conducted a "Wanna Buy a Watt?" fundraising drive, encouraging donations to support the transmitter and the construction of its 200-foot broadcast tower on Crystal Mountain.

By August 1984, after overcoming financial and logistical hurdles, KABF finally went on the air with 10,000 watts. Over time, the station expanded its reach, increasing its power to 100,000 watts three years later. Despite facing challenges, KABF became a vital community resource, offering programming that catered to the interests and needs of a diverse audience in Arkansas.

== See also ==
- List of community radio stations in the United States
