= List of 19 Kids and Counting episodes =

The following is a list of episodes of the television series 19 Kids and Counting. The program is a reality/documentary series about the Duggar Family, shown on TLC. The series began on September 29, 2008, and has had ten seasons, plus eighteen specials to date. TLC suspended airing the show on May 22, 2015, and officially canceled it on July 16, 2015. The last episode aired May 19, 2015.

== Series overview ==
Season	Episodes	Originally released	
Season	Episodes	First released	Last released
1	10	September 29, 2008	November 10, 2008
2	20	January 25, 2009	June 23, 2009
3	28	June 30, 2009	December 22, 2009
4	38	January 31, 2010	November 30, 2010
5	33	January 24, 2011	November 8, 2011
6	26	February 14, 2012	October 30, 2012
7	21	April 2, 2013	October 22, 2013
8	12	April 1, 2014	June 3, 2014
9	17	September 2, 2014	November 25, 2014
10	22	February 17, 2015	May 19, 2015

== Episodes ==
=== Season 1 (2008) ===
No. overall	No. in season	Title	Original release date
1	1*	"Big Family Meets Big Apple"	September 29, 2008
The Duggars head to New York City to be featured on NBC's Today show as part of Mother's Day. The Duggars take in the view in Central Park, and work up an appetite for a real New York pizza lunch.
2	2	"Duggars Do New York"	September 29, 2008
The Duggars' New York City adventure continues. However, Michelle and Jim Bob Duggar have a big secret; Michelle is expecting baby number 18, and the Duggars are trying to keep the news a secret until they can surprise the other 17 children on the Today show.
3	3	"Josh Gets Engaged"	October 6, 2008
This episode features the Duggars' rules about dating and courtship and includes a hidden camera view of oldest son Josh popping the big one to Anna Keller, on her 20th birthday.
4	4	"Duggar Dating Rules"	October 6, 2008
Josh brings Anna to Arkansas after the engagement in the last episode. The Duggars explain their beliefs about relationships with the opposite sex, where hand holding is a privilege, chaperones always accompany the couple and (in addition to their opposition to premarital sex) saving your first kiss for your wedding day.
5	5	"When Big Families Collide"	October 13, 2008
The Bates clan, a fellow mega-family from Tennessee (Gil, Kelly and their 16 children, with another on the way), decide to pay the Duggars a visit to their new Arkansas home. The episode centers around the logistical challenges of nearly 40 people in one house, as well as the similarities and differences between the two families.
6	6	"Bates vs. Duggars Smackdown"	October 13, 2008
The Bates family and the Duggars compete in paintball and dare each other to jump out of an airplane.
7	7	"Cheaper By the Duggars"	October 20, 2008
The Duggars explain their ways of thriftiness: they do not use credit cards, only debit cards or cash; they purchase clothing from second hand stores, groceries from Aldi, grow their own vegetables, chop firewood to heat their home and even have a recipe to make their own laundry detergent.
8	8	"Trading Places, Duggar Style"	October 27, 2008
Each Duggar has his/her own chores (or "jurisdictions", as they call them), which are somewhat gender-specific. However, Jim Bob decides that, on this day, the jurisdictions will switch and the boys will do the cooking, laundry and cleaning, while the girls learn the basics about car repairs.
9	9	"Big Family Reunion"	November 3, 2008
The Duggars take a trip to Ohio for Michelle's family reunion. On the way, the family visits the Creation Museum in Petersburg, Kentucky where animatronic dinosaurs roam the earth with Adam and Eve. Prior to the trip Michelle goes in for an ultrasound, where the family learns that their 18th baby is a girl.
10	10	"Duggars Learn to Drive"	November 10, 2008
Jinger successfully passes her driving test. The Duggars also celebrate Michelle's birthday and discuss their upcoming book.

* One-hour episode

=== Season 2 (2009) ===
Starting with episode nine, the series name was changed to 18 Kids and Counting.

No. overall	No. in season	Title	Original release date
11	1	"Once a Bride, Always a Duggar"	January 25, 2009
Josh and Anna plan for their upcoming wedding.
12	2	"I Left My Duggar in San Francisco"	January 27, 2009
Jim Bob and Michelle celebrate their 25th wedding anniversary in San Francisco.
13	3	"Duggars on Safari"	January 27, 2009
Jim Bob and the Duggar kids volunteer at Wild Wilderness Safari.
14	4	"A Duggar in the Rough"	February 3, 2009
The Duggars visit Crater of Diamonds State Park. They also participate in a book signing of their book at Wal-Mart.
15	5	"O Come All Ye Duggars"	February 3, 2009
The Duggars celebrate Christmas, including decorating and entering a float in the local Christmas parade.
16	6	"Duggars in El Salvador"	February 17, 2009
The Duggars go on a mission trip to El Salvador and volunteer at an orphanage.
17	7	"Duggars on a Mission"	February 17, 2009
The Duggars continue their mission trip to El Salvador, while Jim Bob struggles to learn Spanish. The Duggars throw a Christmas party for children at an orphanage to wrap up their mission trip.
18	8*	"Bringing Home Baby Duggar"	February 24, 2009
Baby Jordyn-Grace arrives home from the hospital, just in time for a family photo shoot with People magazine.
19	9	"Lights, Camera, Duggars"	March 3, 2009
The Duggars go to the San Antonio Independent Christian Film Festival, where they watch movies and meet actor Kirk Cameron, as well as the Von Trapp Children.
20	10	"Duggars' Room with a View"	March 17, 2009
Michelle, Jim Bob, Jessa, Jinger, and baby Jordyn travel to New York City to appear on ABC's talk show, The View.
21	11	"Duggars on Ice"	April 7, 2009
The Duggars experience an ice storm, which results in loss of electricity and the destruction of numerous trees and a shed. Jordyn also ends up in the hospital for several days due to breathing difficulties from a cold.
22	12	"Duggars' Big Thaw"	April 14, 2009
The Bates family arrive after the ice storm to lend the Duggars a helping hand. Also, Josh and Anna announce Anna's pregnancy. The show also features Grandpa Duggar for the last time before his death.
23	13	"Duggars Say Goodbye"	April 28, 2009
The family mourns the loss of Grandpa Duggar.
24	14	"New Duggars on The Block"	May 5, 2009
Newlyweds Josh and Anna settle into their new home and contemplate parenthood. Also, Anna cooks dinner for the entire Duggar family with help from Jana and Jinger.
25	15	"Duggars on a Double Date"	May 12, 2009
Expectant parents Josh and Anna celebrate the news on a double date with Amy and her new boyfriend Mike.
26	16	"Duggars and Dentists"	May 26, 2009
Even mundane things like decorating and visiting the dentist become adventures when 18 kids are involved. Also the Duggars install new blinds in their home.
27	17	"Duggar School Daze"	June 2, 2009
The Duggars talk about homeschooling their kids, and the importance of a good education, no matter what building it takes place in. Michelle and some of the kids (the four oldest daughters, Josiah, and Jordyn) visit a public school.
28	18	"Duggars Under the Knife"	June 9, 2009
Jana and Jill have their wisdom teeth removed. Before Jill has her procedure done, she has a hard time coping due to her fear of needles.
29	19	"Big Family in Big Sandy"	June 16, 2009
The Duggars embark on a road trip to Big Sandy, Texas, in order to attend the Advanced Training Institute (ATI) Home School Conference.
30	20	"Duggars On Wheels"	June 23, 2009
The family throws Jason a birthday party at a roller skating rink to celebrate his ninth birthday.

* One-hour episode

=== Season 3 (2009) ===
No. overall	No. in season	Title	Original release date
31	1	"Oh Duggar Baby! It's a..."	June 30, 2009
Josh and Anna do not know if their first child will be a boy or girl. Josh and Anna are kept in the dark until it is revealed live on NBC's Today show through a special cake from Buddy Valastro, the Cake Boss.
32	2	"Duggars and Daughters"	July 7, 2009
Jim Bob takes his older daughters and some family friends camping at the Fort Rock Family Camp for a family wilderness retreat.
33	3	"Duggars in Dixie"	July 14, 2009
The Duggars are packing and preparing for a trip to Pigeon Forge, Tennessee, where they visit Dolly Parton's famous Dixie Stampede.
34	4	"Duggars Meet Dolly"	July 21, 2009
The Duggars are at Dollywood, where they enjoy a song with Dolly Parton and ride on their own float in the Dollywood Parade.
35	5	"Duggars and Bates Reloaded"	July 28, 2009
The Duggars are on the road to visit the Bates.
36	6	"Do It Yourself Duggars"	August 4, 2009
The Duggars have settled in for an extended stay with the Bates family. Their mission: begin construction to expand the Bates' house.
37	7	"Duggars on a Deadline"	August 11, 2009
The Bates family's home addition is still underway and the Duggars are there to see it through, as both families continue to share the small spaces.
38	8	"Duggars and Dugouts"	August 18, 2009
The Duggars enjoy some of their favorite pastimes including a broomball match. Later, the Duggars are VIP guests at a Northwest Arkansas Naturals minor league baseball game.
39	9	"Duggars in DC"	August 25, 2009
The Duggars are on their way to the nation's capitol, Washington, D.C., with a stop in Amish country.
40	10	"Star Spangled Duggars"	September 1, 2009
The Duggars make their way around Washington, visiting landmarks, volunteering at Mariam's Kitchen and even eating dinner at an Ethiopian restaurant.
41	11	"Duggars Bowled Over"	September 8, 2009
James celebrates his eighth birthday with a birthday party at a local bowling alley.
42	12	"Duggars' New Additions"	September 15, 2009
The Duggars have an even fuller house when the Wilson family, which has nine children, visits to help with some home renovations, but once things get moving, it is anyone's guess where the new additions will stop. Also, Michelle announces that she is pregnant with her nineteenth baby.
43	13	"Duggar on a Diet"	September 22, 2009
Jim Bob decides to go on a diet just as the daughters of soundman Mr. Jim come to meet the Duggars.
44	14	"Duggars Say Yes to the Dress"	September 29, 2009
Jim Bob and Michelle prepare to renew their vows after 25 years of marriage. The Duggars go to New York City to visit Kleinfeld to find Michelle's dream wedding dress.
45	15	"20 Years, 20 Duggars"	October 6, 2009
The Duggars are not the typical family, but with twenty family members and twenty years under their belts they have made it work. Jim Bob and Michelle take a look back at their beginnings as a family and strengthen their future by renewing their vows. Note: This is a continuation of "Duggars Say Yes To The Dress".
46	16	"Duggars at the Doctor"	October 13, 2009
Michelle helps Anna prepare for the delivery of her baby by going to a doctor's appointment, then taking a trip to the consignment shop.
47	17	"First GrandDuggar!"	October 13, 2009
Josh and Anna welcome their daughter, Mackynzie Renée, into the world. They prepare for the home birth of their beloved baby girl, and afterwards, introduce her to her 17 aunts and uncles.
48	18	"Old McDuggar Had a Farm"	October 20, 2009
The family takes a trip to Oklahoma to see what life is like on a working farm.
49	19	"You Ask, Duggars Answer"	October 27, 2009
The Duggar family answers viewers' most frequently asked questions.
50	20	"Run Duggars, Run"	October 27, 2009
The Duggars participate in the Run for a Child race, with Jim Bob planning on running in "unorthodox" apparel for the sport—jeans.
51	21	"Duggars on Stage"	November 3, 2009
The Duggars go to see the musical of Noah's Ark on stage and are asked to participate in the show.
52	22	"Duggars Fly the Coop"	November 10, 2009
The Duggars visit an ostrich farm and get to bring home a family-sized treat as a special souvenir.
53	23	"Duggars Jump For Joy"	November 17, 2009
The Duggars celebrate Joy-Anna's birthday as she turns 12 years old with a rock climbing party, laser tag, and a special gift.
54	24	"GrandDuggar: First Month"	November 24, 2009
Josh and Anna reflect how the new family of three is doing just a month after Mackynzie was born.
55	25	"A Mountain of Duggars"	December 1, 2009
The Duggars take a fall foliage trip to Asheville, North Carolina and while there, they visit the Biltmore Estate and pick apples.
56	26	"Duggars and Bates Reunion"	December 8, 2009
The Duggars go to Pigeon Forge, Tennessee to help ring in the Christmas season and enjoy a reunion with the Bates family, who just welcomed their 17th baby.
57	27	"Designing Duggars"	December 15, 2009
The Duggars and Wilsons help the Bates family finish their home renovation project while facing the challenges of trying to get everything done within a one-week deadline with 40 children are running around.
58	28	"Duggars in the Sky"	December 22, 2009
The family meets the Nashville Predators hockey team. Also, when the crew brings in a helicopter to film aerial shots, the kids get to see their house from a whole new height.

=== Season 4 (2010) ===
Starting with this season, the show's title was changed to 19 Kids and Counting.

No. overall	No. in season	Title	Original release date	US viewers (millions)
59	1	"Special Duggar Delivery"	January 31, 2010	N/A
The premature birth of their 19th baby, Josie Brooklyn Duggar, is born a C-Section, weighing 1 pound 6 ounzes.
60	2	"Josie Duggar's First Christmas"	February 2, 2010	N/A
The Duggars have already received an early Christmas present—their 19th child, Josie. In celebration, the Duggars recount Christmases past.
61	3	"Duggars Fly South"	February 9, 2010	N/A
Josh, Anna and Mackynzie take a trip to Florida to visit Anna's family for the first time since Mackynzie was born and they make a special stop to reminisce about how they started their family.
62	4	"Duggars Movin' Out"	February 16, 2010	N/A
With Josie still in the neonatal intensive care unit, the Duggar family make the decision to move to Little Rock to be closer to her. However, with Jim Bob and Michelle busy with Josie, it is up to Grandma Duggar to set up the new home and watch over the little kids.
63	5	"Duggars Dig In"	February 23, 2010	N/A
Now that the Duggar family has made the move to Little Rock, they are finally getting back into their daily routine, but first they need to take a trip to the grocery store to shop for their family. Also: Josie reaches an important milestone in her growth; and Jim Bob and the older girls give blood.
64	6	"Duggars Under Water"	March 2, 2010	N/A
The Duggar family takes a trip to see the USS Razorback submarine, but back home, John-David and Joseph have to fix a major water leak in one of their father's rental properties. Also, baby Josie continues to makes progress.
65	7	"Josie Duggar's First Hug"	March 9, 2010	N/A
The Duggars adjust to life in Little Rock getting back to their school work. The kids explain how they deal with homeschooling while away from home. Also, Michelle is able to hold little Josie for the first time.
66	8	"Driving Miss Duggars"	March 16, 2010	N/A
Josh, Anna, and Mackynzie get a visit from the older Duggar daughters, as they head back to Springdale, Arkansas, to tie up some loose ends.
67	9	"Duggars in the Driver's Seat"	March 23, 2010	N/A
Joseph and Josiah return to their home in Springdale to do some work on it. They also help out at the car lot with Josh and Anna as Anna sells her first vehicle.
68	10	"Duggars and DJs"	March 30, 2010	N/A
The Duggars participate in a radio fundraiser in an effort to give back to the Arkansas Children's Hospital, which has been taking care of Josie.
69	11	"Josie Duggar Sisterhood"	April 6, 2010	N/A
The Duggars spend the day out and about in Little Rock, which includes a trip to the Discovery Museum. When Michelle and Jim Bob get sick, Jana and Jill visit Josie.
70	12	"Josie Duggar Meets the Bates"	April 13, 2010	N/A
Gil and Kelly Bates, along with their 17 children, travel to Little Rock to meet Josie for the first time. The families also visit a new church.
71	13	"Josie Duggar's First Shoes"	April 20, 2010	N/A
With Josie still in the hospital, the Duggars keep finding ways to welcome her to the family. Anna and Amy take a knitting class and make Josie her first pair of baby booties.
72	14	"Duggar Mountain Way"	April 27, 2010	N/A
The Duggars plan a day trip to Pinnacle Mountain complete with hiking, camouflage demonstration, and a picnic, which becomes unappetising when the Pinnacle Mountain tour guides ask them to become members of the "I Ate a Bug Club".
73	15	"Duggar Heavy Metal"	May 4, 2010	N/A
The Duggars go to Mountain View, Arkansas to visit Stone County Ironworks to learn about the art of being a blacksmith. They also get to make their own ironworking project and listen to bluegrass music.
74	16*	"Josie Comes Home"	May 9, 2010	N/A
Josie finally reunites with the rest of the family in the Little Rock home after four months in the hospital.
75	17	"Duggars at the Hospital"	May 11, 2010	N/A
Jim Bob and some of the Duggar kids return to their home in Springdale to do some spring cleaning in preparation for Josie's homecoming. However, when she has a setback, the family must reunite in Little Rock once again.
76	18	"Duggars Go Wild"	May 18, 2010	N/A
Jim Bob and the children take a trip to the Little Rock Zoo. Also, Jim Bob and Michelle are able to witness another premature baby being treated while they are at the hospital to visit Josie.
77	19	"Duggar Home Alone"	May 25, 2010	N/A
Jim Bob takes the children to the ATI conference in Big Sandy, while Michelle gets to spend some rare alone time at home and visits Josie at the hospital.
78	20	"Duggar Dilemmas"	August 3, 2010	N/A
While doctors struggle to determine what is wrong with Josie's digestive system, Michelle and Jim Bob decide it is time for the other children to return home.
79	21	"Digesting Duggars"	August 3, 2010	N/A
Michelle finds out from the doctors that Josie is lactose intolerant. The family goes to a Mexican restaurant for Jill's 19th birthday. Meanwhile, Jana and John-David take off on their trip to Asia.
80	22	"Duggars Go Hollywood"	August 10, 2010	N/A
The Duggars visit the set of the new film, Courageous, where they meet up with its producers, Alex Kendrick, Stephen Kendrick and Harris Malcolm. Meanwhile, Michelle continues to learn how to take care of Josie on her own back in Little Rock.
81	23	"Duggar Want a Cracker"	August 17, 2010	N/A
On the way back from Georgia, the Duggars stop by to see the Bates family and together, the families visit a parrot sanctuary in Pigeon Forge, Tennessee.
82	24	"Duggars Chicken Out"	August 24, 2010	N/A
The Duggars are planning on packing up and bring Josie home, but their trip back to Tontitown is delayed when twelve of the kids come down with chicken pox.
83	25	"Josie Duggar Home at Last"	August 31, 2010	N/A
The Duggars pack up their home away from home to make the trip back to Tontitown, where Josie is finally reunited with her siblings.
84	26	"Testy Duggars"	September 7, 2010	N/A
The Duggars adjust to life with a preemie and Josie gets a new doctor, who tests her development and growth.
85	27	"Duggars Do Dinner"	September 14, 2010	N/A
The Duggars are planning on having a dinner party, and they invite two other large families to join in for a fun (and crowded) evening. They get an update on the three youngest Duggars: Jordyn, Josie, and granddaughter, Mackynzie. It is also announced that a crewman (Jon Boyle) and his wife are expecting their first child.
86	28	"Duggars Say Cheese"	September 21, 2010	1.32
The Duggars decide it is time to take new family photos now that Josie is home. After the pictures are taken, Josie is off to a check-up where she gets another type of shot.
87	29	"A Tale of Two Duggars"	September 28, 2010	1.18
Now that everyone is back in Tontitown, Jim Bob and Michelle, along with their kids, settle back into their daily routine. Also, Josh and Anna, along with Mackynzie, show what their daily life is like for their smaller family.
88	30	"Duggar in Stitches"	October 5, 2010	1.31
The Duggars embark on a media tour with appearances on NBC's Today show and a photo shoot with People magazine, but the photo shoot ends up being cut short when Johannah has to take an emergency trip to the doctor after a bike accident.
89	31	"Deep Dish Duggars"	October 12, 2010	1.28
Jessa, Jinger, and two of their closest friends, Michaela and Erin Bates, travel to Chicago, to attend a music seminar, as well as to tour the city. Meanwhile, back at home in Arkansas, Jim Bob organizes the kids to wash the family cars.
90	32	"Duggar Diagnosis"	October 19, 2010	1.38
Michelle finds out that her gallbladder, an initial cause of Josie's premature birth, may need more medical attention than originally thought.
91	33	"Duggar Day Out"	October 26, 2010	1.23
Anna takes a few of her sisters-in-law for a girls day out—complete with ice cream and shopping. Josh is hard at work at the car lot.
92	34	"Duggars on Fire"	November 2, 2010	1.33
Anna tries her hand at fashion when she makes "fire skirts" for the girls to wear when they volunteer at the local fire department.
93	35	"Duggars Take a Dip"	November 9, 2010	1.26
The Duggar kids take a swimming lesson and have some fun in the water. Michelle visits a Mother's Morning Out Program, to share her child-raising tips.
94	36	"Duggar Daddy On Duty"	November 16, 2010	1.56
While Michelle and Josie pay a visit to the pediatrician, Jim Bob takes Josiah out on the open road to practice driving before his driver's test. Later, Jim Bob is on daddy-duty all by himself looking after both Jordyn and Josie.
95	37	"Duggars and Sluggers"	November 23, 2010	0.90
Jim Bob and the kids take in the sights of Louisville, Kentucky, which includes a stop at the famous Louisville Slugger Museum & Factory. Back home, Michelle takes care of Josie and prepares to leave her with a babysitter so she can reunite with the family.
96	38	"Duggars Speak Out"	November 30, 2010	1.52
Still in Kentucky, the Duggars have a speaking engagement in front of the largest audience they have ever had.

* One-hour episode

=== Season 5 (2011) ===
No. overall	No. in season	Title	Original release date	US viewers (millions)
97	1*	"Duggars Shoot for the Sky"	January 24, 2011	1.62
Jessa is turning 18 and her parents and siblings have a very special celebration planned, complete with a shooting range and skydiving. Michelle takes a pregnancy test, to see if she can join Jessa in skydiving or not.
98	2	"Duggars Rock the Vote"	January 31, 2011	N/A
John-David decides to follow in his father's footsteps and run for political office with the support of the Duggar clan. Later, Joseph follows in his older siblings' footsteps by getting braces. Finally, Josh and Anna report on the progress of Anna's pregnancy.
99	3	"Donating Duggars"	January 31, 2011	N/A
Television minister Dr. Charles Stanley pays a special visit to the Duggars. The Duggars help the community when they donate their time and a building to the volunteer fire department. Later, they are off to Oklahoma to make supply parachutes for persecuted Colombians.
100	4	"Duggars Rock & Record"	February 7, 2011	N/A
The Duggars have a busy day when family friends visit for lunch, Michelle records an audio book and the family returns to Little Rock to help serve dinner at a fish fry.
101	5	"Duggars Act Out"	February 7, 2011	N/A
The family takes a day trip to visit the set of a passion play, only to find out that the Duggars would become extras in the performance. Back at home, Jill gives Josie her first piano lesson.
102	6	"Duggars All Aboard"	February 14, 2011	1.03
The family celebrates Joy-Anna's 13th birthday with a train ride adventure and an ice cream party. The excitement grinds to a halt when the train has some unexpected guests.
103	7	"Duggars Explore Central America"	February 21, 2011	1.23
Jim Bob and eleven of the kids are headed to Central America, to help those in need, leaving Michelle at home with the seven youngest kids and not much help.
104	8	"Duggars Make a Difference"	February 28, 2011	N/A
Jim Bob and his kids speak with Honduran diplomats, try some of their Honduran food and visit the Mayan ruins.
105	9	"Josie's First Birthday"	March 7, 2011	N/A
The Duggars celebrate Josie's first birthday.
106	10	"Duggars Deliver"	March 14, 2011	1.27
Michelle takes care of the little ones and catches up on her housework, while Anna discovers that it is not easy to care for Mackynzie while pregnant. Furthermore, Josh and Anna find out that their second child will be a boy.
107	11	"Duggars in the Zone"	March 21, 2011	1.24
Josh and Anna are on a deadline to move their second used car lot, but due to zoning laws, they might not be able to make the move after all.
108	12	"Duggars & Bates: 37 & Counting"	March 28, 2011	1.21
The Bates family joins the Duggars on a trip to the George Washington Carver National Monument, but a cold spreads through the two families, which might ruin their plans.
109	13*	"Duggars Hit the Slopes"	June 7, 2011	N/A
The Duggars go to Colorado to try skiing for the first time.
110	14	"Kids to the Rescue"	June 14, 2011	1.26
While Jim Bob and Michelle are in El Salvador, Josie suffers from a seizure.
111	15	"Duggars Focus on Family"	June 14, 2011	1.29
The Duggars share their secrets of running a large family. Also, they conquer their fear of heights.
112	16	"Duggars Get Dirty"	June 21, 2011	1.47
Most of the family come together to clean up some of Jim Bob's rental properties. The Duggars are not all work and no play, as they celebrate Joseph's 16th birthday.
113	17	"Duggars Snowed In"	June 28, 2011	1.09
When the worst snowstorm in Arkansas history hits the Duggars' hometown, the family is engulfed in a real winter wonderland. They weather it with sledding, making snow ice cream, and lending a hand to their neighbors in need.
114	18	"Duggar Boys Day Out"	July 5, 2011	1.07
Jackson gets to hang out with the older Duggar boys as they demolish and renovate the new car lot.
115	19	"Duggars, Doctors, Discipline"	July 12, 2011	1.45
Michelle takes Josie for a check-up. Jessa shows discipline to get the younger Duggars down for a nap.
116	20	"Duggar Dental Drama"	July 19, 2011	1.12
Jessa, Jinger, Joseph and Josh all have dentist appointments for wisdom teeth extractions on the same day. However, when Josh and Joseph miss a crucial step in preparing for the surgery, they become the ones who need a little wisdom.
117	21	"Duggars Respond & Rescue"	July 26, 2011	1.12
The Duggars celebrate Grandma's 70th birthday. The family rushes to help the search and rescue efforts after a tornado destroys much of Joplin, Missouri.
118	22	"Manhattan Duggars"	August 2, 2011	1.04
The Duggars head to New York City to kick off their book tour. Jim Bob, Michelle and all 19 kids try to navigate the subway system.
119	23	"Duggars, Dates, and Dan"	August 2, 2011	N/A
Dan Harris visits the Duggars for a day. The older girls host a dating seminar. Michelle is concerned when Josie becomes sick.
120	24	"Duggar Grandson on Board"	September 27, 2011	1.25
The Duggar's first grandson is having a full day of firsts: baby Michael has his very first checkup—complete with his first shot, meets his cousin Amy for the first time, and is a guest at his first birthday party.
121	25	"Duggars Over the Edge"	September 27, 2011	1.34
The family visits one of the largest waterfalls in North America, Niagara Falls. The Duggars, who are prone to motion sickness, spend the day riding the Maid of the Mist, challenging the Cave of the Winds, and checking out the Jet Boat and Fort Niagara.
122	26	"Duggar Campout"	October 4, 2011	0.93
Jim Bob sets up a tent for an at-home camp-out with the family, despite the forecast highs that day being 105 °F (41 °C).
123	27	"Schoolhouse Duggars"	October 4, 2011	1.00
Michelle demonstrates her homeschooling skills as the family prepares for their annual ATI conference in Big Sandy. Later, the kids visit a Spanish tutor and order in Spanish at a restaurant.
124	28	"Duggar In Danger"	October 11, 2011	1.05
The Duggars are in Atlanta, Georgia for a speaking engagement, then for some fun in the water, which includes jet skiing, tubing and wake boarding. But happiness turns to worry when Jason accidentally falls into a 12-foot orchestra pit, and EMTs come and take him to the ER.
125	29	"Duggars Under the Sea"	October 11, 2011	0.92
The Duggars continue their visit in Atlanta with their trip to the Georgia Aquarium. Later, the family meets professional surfer, and shark attack survivor, Bethany Hamilton.
126	30	"38 Kids & Counting!"	October 18, 2011	1.08
The Duggars once again visit their friends, the Bates, for some fellowship and fun. In addition, the oldest Bates son, Zach, makes a very special request to his girlfriend Sarah, to begin a courtship.
127	31	"Daddy Duggar's Birthday"	October 25, 2011	1.18
It is Jim Bob's birthday, but before the party can start, Michelle gives him a special gift, a trip to the allergist, complete with several rounds of allergy injections.
128	32	"Do Good Duggars"	November 1, 2011	0.94
The Duggars take part in a Habitat for Humanity initiative to help rebuild homes devastated by tornadoes in Birmingham, Alabama.
129	33*	"Duggars: All You Wanted to Know"	November 8, 2011	1.90
The Duggars answer questions taken directly from the viewers. This is followed by an announcement that they were expecting their twentieth child.

* One-hour episode

=== Season 6 (2012) ===
No. overall	No. in season	Title	Original release date	US viewers (millions)
130	1*	"Planning the Future"	February 14, 2012	1.50
The Duggars plant trees and visit a corn maze. Michelle speaks at a women's meeting; the older girls go with her, leaving Jim Bob to take care of the little ones alone. Later, Michelle and Jim Bob visit the obstetrician for a pregnancy check up.
131	2	"Josh & Anna Check In"	February 21, 2012	1.51
Mackynzie gets her first haircut. Josh and Anna provide updates on their car lot and their son Michael.
132	3	"40 Kids, Oh My!"	February 21, 2012	1.51
A family as big as the Duggars, the Vanderhoffs, comes to visit. Jim Bob stays home and plays host while Michelle visits her friend of 39 years. Michelle also does a speaking engagement at a Moms' meeting.
133	4	"Music with the Duggars"	February 28, 2012	1.06
The Duggars make a public appearance at Second Baptist Church in Springfield, Missouri; then head to Branson, where Amy performs live onstage.
134	5	"The Duggar Twist"	February 28, 2012	0.93
The Duggars visit a pretzel shop and help raise money for Alex's Lemonade Stand Foundation, an organization that is aimed at fighting childhood cancer.
135	6	"Duggars in Space"	March 6, 2012	1.17
The Duggars go to Space Camp. The family tests their strengths and skills by doing astronaut training activities such as a multi-axis trainer and flight simulator. Jedidiah undergoes minor surgery to remove a growth from his lip.
136	7	"Swerve and Serve"	March 13, 2012	1.06
The Duggars meet up with some old friends and volunteer at a fish fry. The family celebrates Joy-Anna's 14th birthday and Johannah's 6th birthday. Later, Joy gets her first driving lesson from Michelle.
137	8	"Boys Day Out"	March 20, 2012	0.83
All the Duggar boys help out Josh at his new car lot and Jim Bob and Michelle write their second book.
138	9*	"A Duggar Loss"	March 27, 2012	1.74
Michelle and Jim Bob visit the obstetrician for another routine ultrasound checkup of their baby, only to receive devastating news that the baby miscarried.
139	10	"Duggars Down the Aisle*"	August 28, 2012	1.66
The family travels to Florida for the wedding of Anna's sister Priscilla.
140	11*	"Duggar Growing Pains"	September 4, 2012	1.03
Jordyn gets her head stuck in a railing. The kids get a lesson on pizza dough tossing. While, Jim Bob and Michelle go to Washington DC and have dinner with Kirk Cameron. Note: This is Cameron's second appearance. The first was in season two's "Lights, Camera, Duggars".
141	12	"Duggar Sick Day"	September 4, 2012	0.95
Includes a retrospective look at the growth of the younger children.
142	13	"All You Can Eat"	September 11, 2012	1.26
The Duggars show what they snack on between meals.
143	14	"Puppies, Properties and Patients"	September 11, 2012	1.23
The Duggars pet sit for a pair of puppies and Michelle must manage both the children and the pets. Later, the family renovates a new property.
144	15	"Smile and Say, Duggars!"	September 18, 2012	0.90
The family travels to Joplin, Missouri, where they participate in Mother's Day Fundraiser for the victims of the 2011 tornado. Back home, the Duggars pose for family photos.
145	16	"Duggars Dinner Party"	September 18, 2012	1.08
The Pope family, whose son spent time in the NICU with Josie, visit the Duggar household. Later, everyone pitches in to help Josh move cars from one used car lot to another.
146	17	"Busy Duggars"	September 25, 2012	0.99
The family goes fishing and hiking, and the older Duggar girls, along with Amy, let Grandma Duggar know how much she means to them.
147	18	"A Duggar On Her Own"	September 25, 2012	0.95
Anna is a guest reader for story time at the local public library and brings along Mackynzie and Michael. Jana begins her first solo ministry trip to Michigan.
148	19	"Grand Ole Duggars"	October 2, 2012	0.99
In Nashville, the Duggar family take part in a charity event called Laundry Love and visit the Grand Ole Opry. The four older girls speak at an event, where things get a little emotional.
149	20	"Hunting and House Guests"	October 2, 2012	1.03
Following their honeymoon, David and Priscilla pay a visit to the Duggar home. The family take part in a turkey hunt.
150	21	"Baby Steps"	October 9, 2012	0.94
Josh and Anna add a kitten, Domino, to the family, and baby Michael takes his first steps.
151	22	"Kittens and Konstruction"	October 9, 2012	0.97
The Duggar family care for multiple kittens and Michelle must teach the children how to properly look after them. John David takes on a big renovation project and thinks about his future.
152	23	"First Grandson Turns 1"	October 16, 2012	1.22
The Duggar family celebrate grandson Michael's first birthday. Anna attempts to make a three-tiered high concept cake in time for the party.
153	24	"Thrill Seeking Duggars"	October 16, 2012	0.99
The Vanderhoff family visit the Duggars for dinner. The Duggars visit Branson, Missouri and ride roller coasters. Jill celebrates her 21st birthday.
154	25	"Fencing & Fireworks"	October 23, 2012	1.14
The Duggars are lighting up the sky after the family purchases fireworks for the 4th of July. Then, Jim Bob takes some of the family to their first fencing lesson. Also, the older girls start preparing for Michelle's birthday celebration.
155	26*	"Michelle's Birthday Makeover"	October 30, 2012	1.36
Michelle receives a personal makeover as her birthday gift. Later, Jim Bob and the kids surprise Michelle with announcement that family is taking a trip to Asia ("Duggars Do Asia").

* One-hour episode

=== Season 7 (2013) ===
No. overall	No. in season	Title	Original release date	US viewers (millions)
156	1*	"Baby on the Way"	April 2, 2013	1.37
After the Duggars return home from Asia, Anna invites the family over to tell them the news that she and Josh are expecting baby number three. Jana and Jill are studying to be midwives and spend an afternoon seeing patients, alongside a licensed midwife.
157	2	"Duggar Weight Loss Challenge"	April 9, 2013	1.09
Jim Bob and Josh start a 90-day weight-gain competition. Jason and his brothers build a greenhouse.
158	3	"Things Are Changing"	April 9, 2013	1.28
Priscilla (Anna's sister, who is pregnant with her first baby) and her husband, David, visit, which prompts Josh and Anna to look at houses with more space. Jim Bob and Josh receive the results from their medical exams, which are surprising.
159	4	"Pushups and Planting"	April 16, 2013	0.88
Jim Bob and Josh both begin working with a physical trainer, former NFL player Steve Conley. Jana and Jill have a midwifery client who goes into labor.
160	5	"Coffee & Caricatures"	April 16, 2013	0.91
Jessa and Jinger volunteer to go to an orphanage. Jackson and Johannah draw caricatures to raise money to buy a present for their future niece or nephew.
161	6*	"Love and Marriage"	April 23, 2013	N/A
Jim Bob and Michelle talk about their marriage, the ups and downs of it all, before going to a marriage retreat in Puerto Rico. While they are away, and the older girls are away at a speaking engagement, Grandma (along with Anna) have the challenge of taking care of the little ones.
162	7	"Duggars Go to Jail"	April 23, 2013	N/A
John-David works toward getting his parole reinstated; Joseph leaves and there is a follow-up on Jim Bob's and Josh's weight loss.
163	8	"Dinner for Forty"	May 7, 2013	0.98
Jim Bob and Josh's trainer, Steve Conley and his pastor, come to the Duggars' home for dinner, with their families. Also, Joseph goes to his emergency rescue training boot camp.
164	9	"A Surgery & a Secret"	May 7, 2013	1.10
Jim Bob and Josh feel the pain from their workouts. Jordyn has to have her tonsils taken out.
165	10	"Decisions & Deliveries"	May 14, 2013	1.12
Josh and Anna try to decide whether or not to move 1,200 mi (1,900 km) away, after being presented with a new job offer. Jana and Jill help deliver a baby. The family attends Joseph's graduation from boot camp.
166	11	"Duggars Get Physical"	May 14, 2013	1.14
Josh's family goes to Florida where they visit Anna's family and meet her recently-born nephew, Paul.
167	12*	"Baby Gender Reveal & the Final Weigh In"	May 21, 2013	1.40
The Duggars visit Pastor Howard's church, where he reveals the sex of Josh. Steve creates an obstacle course for the Duggars to participate in before Jim Bob and Josh have their last weigh-in to see who gained the most weight. Josh tries to become the president of calendars.
168	13*	"Big Changes"	September 17, 2013	1.96
Things are changing for the Duggars. Josh and Anna are moving to Washington, D.C., but they still are on a search for a house. The family helps Josh and Anna pack up and move, which includes some help from Steve Conley and along the way they stop in for a visit with the Bates family.
169	14	"An Emotional Goodbye"	September 24, 2013	1.45
The Duggar family say goodbye to Josh and Anna as they head off to their new life in a new place.
170	15	"Factory Farm Duggars"	September 24, 2013	1.66
Jim Bob decides the family should try raising farm animals, so they spend the day cleaning an industrial feedlot.
171	16	"A Big Idea"	October 1, 2013	1.31
Josh and Anna adjust to life in D.C. and Anna decides to go and explore her new neighborhood. The rest of the family come up with another way to give back.
172	17	"Flea Challenge"	October 1, 2013	1.54
The Duggars fight a flea infestation and then decide to have a fundraiser for Arkansas Children's Hospital. Anna tries using the city subway for the first time. Josh rides an ostrich.
173	18*	"Anniversaries to Remember!"	October 8, 2013	1.40
Jim Bob & Michelle celebrate their 29th wedding anniversary, while Josh and Anna celebrate their fifth.
174	19	"Engaging Announcement!"	October 15, 2013	1.45
The Duggars visit the Bates family. Erin Bates announces her engagement to Chad Paine. The older girls, along with their mothers, go camping.
175	20	"Duggar Challenges!"	October 15, 2013	1.54
Anna invites some new friends over for dinner, so she must learn to juggle. The Duggars revisit their fleas.
176	21*	"Flea Market Finale"	October 22, 2013	1.40
The Duggars have their flea market with a goal to raise $10,000 for Arkansas Childrens hospital's NICU, with the help of family and friends. All sorts of activities are planned, along with an auction, to help raise money. The family receives a surprise visit from Josh, Anna, and their kids, who have come to participate in the flea market. The Duggars raise almost $20,000. At the end of the episode, Jim Bob announces that Jessa is in a courtship with a young man named Ben Seewald. They text each other (with rest of the family receiving texts, too) as part of their getting-to-know-each-other phase of their relationship.

* One-hour episode

=== Season 8 (2014) ===
No. overall	No. in season	Title	Original release date	US viewers (millions)
177	1*	"A Duggar Says Yes"	April 1, 2014	2.26
When Ben and Jessa's courtship becomes official, the Duggar boys put Ben to the test. Later, the tables are turned on Jessa when she visits Ben's hometown. The whole family reflects on what it means that a Duggar daughter may soon be leaving the nest.
178	2	"Double Dating Duggars"	April 8, 2014	1.85
Jim Bob & Michelle and Jessa & Ben go out on a double date and they discuss the importance of boundaries. Anna builds a playhouse. Jill and her team of buddies (Joy, James and Jennifer) decide to make pickles, the family's favorite snack.
179	3	"Another Courtship?"	April 8, 2014	2.28
Jim Bob and Michelle have found a possible mate for another one of their daughters to court with. The children plan a surprise for their parents. Anna has her hands full now that her husband is in prison.
180	4*	"Wedding Bells"	April 15, 2014	2.24
The Duggars travel to Tennessee (along with Ben and his mother) for the wedding of Erin Bates to Chad Paine. The family talk about saving your first kiss as something special, for their wedding day.
181	5	"Graduation & A Surprise"	April 22, 2014	2.21
Josiah is graduating from high school and his family plans to throw a party, with 400 guests invited, to celebrate. Josh and Anna receive a surprise phone call, the rest of the family is arriving a day early for holiday celebrations, which makes Josh and Anna rush to get everything done in time.
182	6	"Duggars Reunited"	April 29, 2014	1.82
Josh's family arrives in Washington, D.C. for Thanksgiving and also to celebrate Mackynzie, Jordyn and Josie's birthdays, which involves candy making. While there, the older girls make an attempt to drive around the city, to find the recording studio, where they read their book for the audio version and the entire family goes to an ice rink.
183	7*	"Going the Distance for Love"	May 6, 2014	2.54
Jill and Jim Bob arrive in Nepal, visiting with Derick Dillard, who has something important to ask Jim Bob, Michelle decides to spend time with Jessa and talk to her daughter about her courtship with Ben.
184	8*	"The Big Question"	May 13, 2014	2.24
While in Nepal, Jim Bob gets a shave and Jill volunteers her midwife services at a birthing center. Before they head back to Arkansas, Derick disappears.
185	9	"Something New"	May 20, 2014	1.85
Jessa and Jinger head to Ben's house, where his sisters teach Jessa how to cook his favorite meal. In DC, Josh & Anna, along with Jana and Joseph, embark on a skiing trip. Michelle spends time with Joy-Anna and tries her hand at the violin.
186	10	"Couples' Weekend"	May 20, 2014	2.02
Jill and Jana assist at a birth as Jessa documents the day in pictures. Then, Jim Bob & Michelle visit a fertility doctor. Ben, Jessa, and chaperone Jinger head to D.C. to visit Josh & Anna. Anna wants to show Ben the city, but Josh has other plans. Ben buys a deadbolt for his door.
187	11*	"A Toast to Love"	May 27, 2014	2.79
Michelle eats a peach. Plus, the kids surprise Jim Bob and Michelle with a dinner they will not forget.
188	12*	"The Proposal"	June 3, 2014	3.03
The girls promote their book, "Growing Up Duggar", with a book tour, that includes Josh, Anna and their kids. Meanwhile, Derick makes secret plans at home that involve getting permission from Jim Bob to propose to Jill.

* One-hour episode

=== Season 9 (2014) ===
No. overall	No. in season	Title	Original release date	US viewers (millions)
189	1*	"Duggars & Mothers"	September 2, 2014	3.29
The Dillards and Seewalds have Mother's Day lunch at the Duggars'. Meanwhile, Jill begins planning her wedding.
190	2	"Duggar Daughter Dates"	September 9, 2014	2.64
Jill and Derick go on a hike and picnic, while Jessa and Ben have a date at a shooting range, with both outings chaperoned, by James and Jason, respectively.
191	3	"Duggar-sized Wedding Planning"	September 9, 2014	2.68
Wedding plans for Jill and Derick include tasting cakes and touring venues. Meanwhile, Anna stays busy with her three children in Washington, D.C.
192	4	"Duggar Dirty Jobs"	September 16, 2014	2.43
Ben moves into the guesthouse on the Duggars' property, and Jim Bob puts him to work with a long list of chores to be completed by day's end. Meanwhile, Jill and Derick shop for wedding bands.
193	5	"Duggar Decorated & Diet"	September 16, 2014	2.42
Josh gets a surprise visit from Steve Conley, his former trainer, who assesses Josh's current eating and exercising habits. Meanwhile, Jinger takes engagement photos of Jill and Derick.
194	6*	"Jill Says Yes to the Dress"	September 23, 2014	2.50
A Mother-daughters trip to D.C. to buy Jill's wedding dress, and the guys' getaway rock climbing and zip lining.
195	7	"Duggar Girls Go Glam"	September 30, 2014	2.37
Jill's vintage dress vision drives the search for her bridesmaids' attire as she and her sisters also discuss their hairstyles and makeup.
196	8	"Duggar To-Do's"	September 30, 2014	2.52
The search for the right bridesmaids' shoes is next on Jill's list of wedding preparations. Meanwhile, Josh and Anna make a special wedding gift; and Jim Bob supervises the carpet installation at the newlyweds' first home.
197	9	"Duggars in Cuffs"	October 7, 2014	2.14
Jim Bob and Michelle go on a triple date to celebrate their 30th anniversary. Meanwhile, Josh runs a 5k to help him get back on track with his fitness goals.
198	10	"Duggar Derby"	October 7, 2014	2.05
The family prepares for their derby race. Jessa and Ben take the littlest Duggars out for a day of fun.
199	11*	"Wedding Countdown!"	October 14, 2014	2.96
There is only one week until Jill's wedding and the family is busy with filling their new home with furniture purchased at a local auction.
200	12*	"All About Jill"	October 21, 2014	2.83
Jill's bridal shower allows her to spend time with the new mothers that she met through her work as a midwife.
201	13	"Jill's Wedding"	October 28, 2014	2.83
Jill and Derick's wedding day arrives thanks to all the help from hundreds of volunteers, who will come in handy when the bride's request for root beer floats is in jeopardy due to a freezer malfunction. Note: This is a special two-hour episode.
202	14*	"Jessa's Engagement"	November 4, 2014	3.25
Ben plans a scavenger hunt as a surprise wedding proposal for Jessa that highlights the most memorable moments of their courtship.
203	15*	"DC Duggars Hit The Road"	November 11, 2014	1.78
Josh and Anna head to Chicago with their three little ones, RV-style, to visit Anna's sister Priscilla and her husband David. On their way, they'll visit a series of quirky stops, but will RV issues may put a damper in their trip.
204	16*	"A Reveal To Remember"	November 18, 2014	2.21
The DC Duggars make it to Chicago in time for David & Priscilla's gender reveal party. Later, the family enjoys the sights of the "Windy City" and caps off their trip with a camping excursion.
205	17*	"Amy's Nashville Dreams"	November 25, 2014	1.14
Cousin Amy returns for a new special as she continues to pursue her music career. Amy performs on a sold out showboat dinner cruise then celebrates her 28th birthday with her Duggar family. Plus, we get a behind the scenes look at her new music video.

* One-hour episode

=== Season 10 (2015) ===
No. overall	No. in season	Title	Original release date	US viewers (millions)
206	1*	"Jill's Secret"	February 17, 2015	3.33
The family preps for Jessa's wedding to Ben. Also, Jill shares a life-changing announcement with the family.
207	2	"Jessa Says Yes to the Dress"	February 24, 2015	2.27
Jessa goes wedding dress shopping, with Grandma, Michelle, her sisters, along with Ben's mother and sisters. Derick and Jill give an update on their pregnancy and get a surprise gift for their baby from Josh and Anna.
208	3	"Bridesmaids and Babies"	February 24, 2015	2.14
Jinger, with the help of Joy-Anna and Johannah, take engagement photos of Ben and Jessa, who decide on where to hold both the ceremony and reception. Derick and Jill go visit their midwife and have their first ultrasound of "Baby Dilly".
209	4	"Invites and Ride-Alongs"	March 3, 2015	2.08
Jim Bob does a ride along with John-David while he is on patrol. Jill decides to make a special gift for her mother-in-law. Ben and Jessa ask Josh to design their wedding invites, like he did for Derick and Jill.
210	5	"Wedding Prep and Pies"	March 3, 2015	1.97
Ben designs Jessa's wedding ring, as a surprise for her on their wedding day, while Jessa and her family are out looking at flowers for her wedding. Jason and James decide to make a special meal for their sister's weddings rehearsal dinner, which has to meet with the engaged couple's approval first.
211	6	"Michelle's High School Reunion"	March 10, 2015	2.05
Michelle goes to her 30th high school reunion. The Duggars celebrate Johannah's 9th birthday with a horse back riding party.
212	7	"Race to the Altar"	March 10, 2015	2.14
Ben and Jessa work out with Joy-Anna and Jason, to get shape for the wedding. Later the couple goes to the store to register for wedding gifts and take Jordyn and Justin with them. While there Ben sneaks off with Justin to register for candy for the little kids. Jill invites Jana to help her make Derick's favorite Nepali dinner, Dal Baht.
213	8*	"Wedding Prep"	March 17, 2015	2.27
Jill & Derick go on a double date with Jessa & Ben, to a painting class, while the other Duggars make pizzas. Later the family goes over last minute wedding details for Jessa & Ben's wedding, making sure everything goes according to plan and organizing sleeping arrangements for out of town guests.
214	9*	"The Duggar Brides"	March 24, 2015	2.42
A quick look at Jessa and Ben's upcoming wedding.
215	10*	"All About Jessa"	March 24, 2015	N/A
A look back at Jessa Duggar, starting with the first special, as she grew up into the young woman she is today. Then the family hosts a flag football game, in place of a traditional bachelor/bachelorette party.
216	11	"Jessa's Wedding"	March 31, 2015	3.53
Jessa's wedding day has arrived, which has the couple having ice cream sundaes, with their favorite topping in place of a wedding cake and an outdoor reception, which has the family concerned about the cold weather. Note: This is a special two-hour episode.
217	12	"Jill's Having A...."	April 7, 2015	2.23
The family has a party to find out the sex of Jill and Derick's baby. Derick's mom has a surprise waiting for her in Omaha, where she is having cancer treatments.
218	13	"Birthing Class and Teamwork"	April 7, 2015	2.29
With Jill and Jessa married and out the house, Joy-Anna is in charge of assigning their chores to her younger siblings. Derrick and Jill attend their first birthing class.
219	14*	"Duggars Say I Do"	April 14, 2015	1.95
The Duggars explain what goes into a "Duggar-sized wedding" and reflect upon previous Duggar weddings and its preparation.
220	15*	"European Honeymoon"	April 21, 2015	2.57
Jessa and Ben go on their European honeymoon, where they visit Paris, France, & Italy. Meanwhile, the Duggar clan renovates the newlywed's home. At family prayer time, Josh & Anna announce they are expecting their fourth child.
221	16	"Family Dinner"	April 28, 2015	2.90
Jill and Derick visit Josh and Anna in Washington D.C., where Derick gets some fatherly advice and practices being a father. Jessa cooks dinner for Ben in their new home.
222	17	"Nesting and Room Re-Do"	April 28, 2015	3.23
Derick and Jill get ready for their son's arrival by looking for nursery essentials. The girls redo their bedroom at the Duggar house.
223	18	"Jill's Special Delivery"	May 5, 2015	2.97
While anticipating Baby Dilly's arrival in just a few more weeks, Jill and Derek finish creating the baby's nursery. Finally, after a little over nine months and a 70-hour labor, Jill gives birth to Israel David Dillard via Caesarean section. Note: This is a special two-hour episode.
224	19*	"Behind the Scenes"	May 12, 2015	1.45
The Duggars explain what it's like behind the cameras and how they interact with the crew.
225	20*	"Anna's Having A..."	May 12, 2015	2.29
When Josh and Anna find out the gender of their baby, the Duggars put together and throw a gender-reveal party.
226	21*	"Duggars Guide to Love"	May 19, 2015	1.59
The Duggars share their rules to love
227	22*	"Digging in With the Duggars"	May 19, 2015	1.67
NBC News anchor Erica Hill sits down for an interview with the family. Note: This is the final episode of the series.

* One-hour episode

== Specials and miniseries ==
=== Pre-series ===
No.	Title	Original release date
S–01	"14 Children and Pregnant Again!"	September 6, 2004
This one hour special features an introduction of the Duggars (Jim Bob, Michelle and their fourteen children) and birth of their fifteenth child, Jackson Levi.
S–02	"Raising 16 Children"	March 13, 2006
In this special, the Duggars move into a rental van while building their new house and features the roadside birth of baby number sixteen, Johannah Faith.
S–03	"16 Children and Moving In"	March 15, 2006
The Duggars move into their newly built home, with their sixteen children.
S–04	"On the Road with 16 Children"	June 11, 2006
The Duggars go on a road trip across the Western United States.
S–05	"Duggars' Big Family Album"	September 22, 2007
Their seventeenth baby, Jennifer Danielle, is born and recaps from previous specials.

=== Series specials ===
No.	Title	Original release date
S–06	"And Baby Makes 18"	December 22, 2008
The family prepares for the arrival of the newest Duggar, Jordyn-Grace Makiya, who is delivered by C-section.
S–07	"A Very Duggar Wedding"	January 25, 2009
Josh and Anna's wedding, including preparing and planning for the rehearsal, wedding ceremony and reception.
S–08	"Duggars Make a Movie"	November 21, 2010
After years of being the family in front of the cameras, it is the Duggars' turn to make their own episode, as the kids produce, film and star in their own special.
S–09	"GrandDuggar First Birthday"	December 7, 2010
Jim Bob and Michelle's first grandchild, Mackynzie, turns one, celebrating with her parents, grandparents and eighteen aunts and uncles. The family has another reason to celebrate when Anna and Josh announce that they are pregnant again.
S–10	"First Grandson"	June 19, 2011
Josh and Anna introduce their new baby boy, Michael James, to the world.

=== Duggars World Tour ===
No.	Title	Original release date	US viewers (millions)
S–11	"Duggars World Tour: Scotland & Ireland"	November 13, 2011	1.52
The Duggars (including Michelle, who was pregnant with her twentieth child) go to Scotland, where they walk the Royal Mile, visit Edinburgh Castle and see the Scottish Highland games. They then head to Ireland, where they herd sheep.
S–12	"World Tour: Royal Duggars"	November 20, 2011	1.20
The next stop for the family's tour of the British Isles is London, where Jim Bob learns how to drive on the left side of the road, the Duggars enjoy high tea, sightsee on a double-decker bus and visit Stonehenge.
S–13	"World Tour: Duggars Last Stop"	November 27, 2011	1.16
The Duggars visit Israel, the third and final stop on their international trip, where the Duggars swim in the Dead Sea, visit an outdoor marketplace, ride camels and try local cuisine.

=== Bates spin-off ===
Title	Original release date	US viewers (millions)
"The Bates Family: And Baby Makes 19"	March 13, 2012	1.06
(Also known as The Bates Family Special) The Duggars' friends, Gil and Kelly Bates, introduce viewers to their own world and family of 21.

=== Duggars Do Asia ===
No.	Title	Original release date	US viewers (millions)
S–14a	"Duggars Do Asia: Tokyo, Japan"	March 12, 2013	1.26
The Duggars head to Asia beginning with a visit to Tokyo, Japan. The gang attempts to shop for American products. At the hotel, greeted with a delicious, traditional Japanese breakfast, the Duggars sneak snacks instead. Afterwards, they do a little shopping and ride a rickshaw.
S–14b	"Duggars Do Asia: Kyoto, Japan"	March 19, 2013	0.89
After appearing as guests on a Japanese morning news program in Tokyo, the family makes their way by Shinkansen train to Kyoto, where the girls try on kimono and traditional makeup, while the boys pick up swords for a Samurai lesson. Jim Bob mistakes the Spanish language for Japanese.
S–14c	"Duggars Do Asia: Beijing, China"	March 26, 2013	1.21
The family struggles to navigate the Beijing, China's subway system and make it to Tiananmen Square. Jana and Jill use their midwifery training when a member of the television crew goes into labor.

=== Josh and Anna ===
No.	Title	Original release date	US viewers (millions)
S–15	"GrandDuggar Makes 3!"	June 16, 2013	1.37
In this Father's Day special, the newest member of the Duggar clan, Marcus Anthony, is introduced.
S–16	"Josh & Anna: Our Story"	October 22, 2013	1.52
Josh and Anna look back on five years of marriage and three kids, to where it all began. They talk about what they were looking for in a spouse and how things have changed over the past five years.

=== Amy Duggar ===
No.	Title	Original release date	US viewers (millions)
S–17	"A Big Announcement!"	June 10, 2014	1.59
Cousin Amy Duggar has a big announcement to her family, a first for her. She is headed to Nashville, to pursue her dream of singing, something she has been doing since she was a child. The Duggars wish her well and pray for her success in Nashville, before she leaves. Note: The special was two, one hour episodes, one counting as a 19 Kids and Counting episode.
S–18	"A Duggar Leaves Home"	June 10, 2014	1.71
Amy, along with her mother and grandmother (Grandma Duggar) head to Nashville to see if Amy can make her dream of being a singer come true. While there, Amy sings on the street in front of strangers and later on sings at a club in front a representative for a local record label.

=== Jill & Jessa Counting On ===
No.	Title	Original release date	US viewers (millions)
S–19	"A New Chapter"	December 13, 2015	2.20
A three part series follows the lives of Jill Dillard and Jessa Seewald as the two Duggar sisters adjust to new surroundings, marriage and parenthood. In the premiere, Jill and Derick prepare for a move to Central America with their six month old son, Israel, while Jessa and Ben get ready to welcome their first baby.
S–20	"Baby Shower & A New Home"	December 20, 2015	1.89
A baby food competition is planned by Ben to coincide with Jessa's coed baby shower, while Jill and Derick say good-bye to family and friends before they leave for their new life in Central America. Also: an interview with Anna Duggar.
S–21	"Counting One More"	December 27, 2015	2.47
Jessa and Ben have dinner with friends who have been through the adoption process; while Derick's mother spends time with Jill and Derick in Central America. New parents Ben and Jessa celebrate the birth of their baby boy.

== See also ==
- List of Counting On episodes
