= KKAP =

Television station in Little Rock, Arkansas

- Little Rock, Arkansas; United States
- Channels: Digital: 36 (UHF); Virtual: 36

Programming
- Affiliations: 36.1: Daystar; 36.2: Daystar Español; 36.3: Daystar Reflections

Ownership
- Owner: Community Television Educators, Inc.; (Word of God Fellowship, Inc.); (Educational Broadcasting Corporation)

History
- First air date: May 2001
- Former channel numbers: Analog: 36 (UHF, 2001–2009)

Technical information
- Licensing authority: FCC
- Facility ID: 58267
- ERP: 50 kW
- HAAT: 394 m (1,293 ft)
- Transmitter coordinates: 34°47′56″N 92°29′45″W

Links
- Public license information: Public file; LMS
- Website: www.daystar.com

KKAP (channel 36) is a religious television station in Little Rock, Arkansas, United States, part of the Daystar Television Network. The station is owned by the Community Television Educators subsidiary of Daystar holding company Word of God Fellowship, Inc. KKAP's studios are located on Shackelford Drive in the Beverly Hills section of Little Rock, and its transmitter is located on Shinall Mountain, near the Chenal Valley neighborhood of Little Rock.

== History ==
The station first signed on the air in May 2001.

== Technical information ==
=== Subchannels ===
Subchannels of KKAP
Subchannel	Res.	Short name	Programming
36.1	1080i	KKAP	Daystar
36.2	720p	KKAP-ES	Daystar Español
36.3	480i	KKAP-SD	Daystar Reflections

=== Analog-to-digital conversion ===
Because it was granted an original construction permit after the Federal Communications Commission (FCC) finalized the DTV allotment plan on April 21, 1997, the station did not receive a companion channel for its digital signal. KKAP shut down its analog signal, over UHF channel 36, on June 12, 2009, and "flash-cut" its digital signal into operation on UHF channel 36.
