= Pinnacle Mountain =

Pinnacle Mountain may refer to:

- Pinnacle Mountain State Park
- Pinnacle Mountain (Arkansas)
- Pinnacle Mountain (South Carolina)
- Pinnacle Mountain (Alberta)
- Pinnacle Mountain (Washington)
