= The Corey and Jay Show =

American comedy radio program

The Corey and Jay Show is a terrestrial radio program co-hosted by Corey Deitz and Jay Hamilton. It was based in Little Rock, Arkansas on 100.3 The Edge, and aired live from 6:00 am to 10:00 am Central, it also aired for about 15 years on various other stations in Little Rock, as well as in Cleveland, St. Louis, and Chicago. While the show was broadcast from WRVQ-FM in Richmond, it was awarded "Best Morning Show in Virginia" by the Virginia Association of Broadcasters two consecutive years. In Little Rock, Corey and Jay were awarded "Best Radio Personalities" by Little Rock Monthly magazine in 2003. In 2008, Corey and Jay were announced by the National Association of Broadcasters as finalists for an NAB Marconi Radio Award - Medium Market Personality of the Year. Jay was replaced by longtime special guest "Angry Patrick", and the show's name changed to The Corey and Patrick Show.

The show is a mixture of both topical and oddball news stories, comedy from various sources, and the hosts' personal anecdotes on their lives and commentary on world and local events. They were early innovators of incorporating the internet into the show in the late 1990s. They were two of the first radio personalities in Little Rock to have a website dedicated to their show, and referred to it many times on air. They also encouraged listeners to email them things they found on the internet which they would talk about and mention on their show. These came to be known as "Missing Links". In addition, the general theme of the show tended to revolve around things the duo found on the internet such as their very popular segment, "Head Up Your Ass Headlines", during which they would read bizarre news stories from around the world gathered from various websites. They were even one of the first shows to stream over the internet, although this became more difficult as the legality of playing copyrighted music over the internet eventually came into question.

It was announced in September 2023 that after more than 25 years on Little Rock radio, Corey Deitz will be retiring at the end of the 2023.

== Biographies ==
Corey Deitz was born in Passaic, New Jersey and graduated from Kent State University with a degree in Telecommunications. He has worked in several radio markets, including Chicago, St. Louis, and Cleveland. He also maintains several websites, and writes books. In 2004, he published his first book, The Ca$h Cage, about his experiences working in radio.

His second book in 2008 was a memoir about his days at Boy Scout Camp which contained funny stories and life lessons. It is entitled Lessons from Camp: Wisdom in the Past Tents.

Deitz released a third book in 2009 which is a satirical manifesto on his political beliefs called Vilified! Red Meat for Conservatives from a Guy Who's Got a Lot of Beefs.

Deitz's fourth book was a humorous take on the 2012 Mayan Calendar phenomenon entitled The 2012 Guide Book or How to Make the End of the World Fun!

His fifth book, released in late 2011 is billed as "...one man's quest to rid himself of all his psychological demons by exorcising them with self-deprecating humor." It is called Shut Up: We All Have Issues.

He is married and has two sons and a daughter-in-law. He is also an avid motorcyclist.

Jay Hamilton has also worked in several radio markets, including Wilmington, Sarasota, Cleveland, He and Deitz teamed up at Q94 in Richmond, Virginia in 1990. He also worked as Executive Producer for the American Comedy Network from 1988 to 1990.

During the morning broadcast on October 22, 2012, it was announced that Hamilton had left the show. Dietz stated that Hamilton had not been fired, that he instead had chosen to leave for personal reasons. It was also stated that an extensive search would be conducted to find a replacement for Hamilton, and that listener input from social media would be taken into consideration.

On the morning of December 20, 2012 it was announced on air that Patrick would become Jay's replacement, and as of January 2, 2013 the show would no longer be called The Corey and Jay Show but would now be called Corey and Patrick in the Morning.

== Other people on the show ==
Although the hosts are the principal contributors and on-air personalities, there have been a handful of other people who have been associated with the show:

- 14K: He was the show's producer for several years, and served as phone screener, public liaison, technical support, and peanut gallery.
- Jersey: Jersey is a mechanic in Little Rock who visits the studio to talk with Deitz and Hamilton on-air, usually on Fridays. He is best known for his distinctive laugh and for his tendency to literally choke on his laughter.
- Angry Patrick: Patrick appears on Fridays after the Week in Review (see below) to rant about current events in pop culture that are bothering him. He even has a little jingle they start him off with. Every week, he also uses his phrase: "Are You Freaking Kidding Me?" He formerly gave movie reviews on Friday.
- Holdboy: When listeners called into the show, they would hear the broadcast before being connected to talk on the air. Holdboy was a listener who was not allowed to listen to the show in his office at work, so he would call in and listen to the broadcast over the phone while on hold. Occasionally, they would mistakenly connect him on the air, after a moment of Corey and Jay repeatedly saying "Hello... Hello". Holdboy would play the music from Austin Powers ending with "Yeah Baby", leading to Corey and Jay laughing and apologizing, and he would say hello, and then ask to be put back on hold.

There have also been various interns who have worked on the show since 14K's departure, but they receive little (if any) on-air attention.

== Features of the show ==
On the show, the hosts' personalities create an odd couple aspect to the show's content, as Deitz is generally laid back and even-keeled while Hamilton is generally curmudgeonly and hot-tempered. Hamilton is also an avid sports fan and likes to make fun of Deitz for not having much interest in sports. Hamilton also teases Deitz for liking fruity cocktails instead of beer and for having a mysterious phobia of Mr. Peanut, while Deitz frequently chides Hamilton for his cynical attitude and the morbid nature of much of the material he uses in the show. Over the course of the show's run, a number of segments with specific themes have been presented.

=== Current segments ===
- Head Up Your Ass Headlines: A rundown of odd news items with no specific theme; this is one of the principal features of the show, taking up the latter half of the second hour of the show.
- Missing Links: The show's website features a list of links to odd and/or humorous websites. Many links are submitted by listeners, while others are found by the hosts. Before Head Up Your Ass Headlines begins, new additions to the Missing Links section are announced.
- When Animals Get Pissed: This is a collection of stories revolving around animals behaving strangely or violently.
- Police Blotter: Strange and/or humorous stories involving crime and criminals are featured in this segment.
- Narc on the Rat Bastard/Snitch on the Bitch: In this segment, the hosts read listener-submitted stories about people engaging in unethical conduct; this allows the person who submitted the story to anonymously "rat out" the person/people in question by making the listening public aware of the activity.
- The Week in Review: The top of the second hour of the show on Fridays is reserved for The Week In Review, which consists of Deitz reading bylines to news stories and then making one-liners about them, or making one-liners or other jokes based on current news stories. Hamilton, Patrick, and Jersey (if present) frequently tease Dietz about the erratic quality of the jokes used in this segment. If Jersey is not in the studio, recorded clips of his laughter (dubbed "Virtual Jersey") are occasionally used as filler.
- The Really Awful Terrible Files: This segment features stories involving gruesome deaths, injuries, and other material deemed disturbing enough to not fit in any other segment. The hosts have repeatedly stated that this segment should not be listened to by the faint of heart or easily offended, and listeners are frequently told that if they laugh at these stories, they "have no soul."
- Hot for Teacher: This segment features stories about teachers behaving inappropriately with students.
- Christmas Is Ruined: This segment runs during December and features news stories of accidents, crimes, and other mishaps involving Christmas in some fashion. The stories are numbered sequentially.
- Halloween Is Ruined: This segment runs during October and features news stories of accidents, crimes, and other mishaps involving Halloween in some fashion. This is the newest segment on the show, and was inspired by Christmas Is Ruined.
- Audio from Hell: This segment contains horrible audio files of extremely questionable quality (examples of poor singing or unlistenable music, etc.) whose lack of quality causes them to be humorous.
- Deathboy: This segment features unusual stories revolving around deaths or murders.
- Obituary of the Day: This segment revolves around unusual or humorous obituaries.
- The September Fund: After the events of 9/11, the hosts set up the September Fund, which is a scholarship fund for children of police officers, military personnel, firefighters, and rescue workers. In 2006, $7000.00 was distributed to seven Arkansas students.

=== Retired segments ===
- The Axe Files: This segment revolved around stories involving freakish acts of nature, unexplainable phenomena, and other odd occurrences. One of the staple stories revolved around a chicken whose body survived for years after its head was severed. The segment was retired partly from boredom on the hosts' part and partly because a listener stole their master tapes of the segment's material. This segment would later become the basis for the Really Awful Terrible Files.
- The "Who Gives a Rat's Ass?" Report: In this segment, the hosts took turns reading celebrity gossip stories. If either had a story that he was uncertain he wanted to read, he would ask, "Do we give a rat's ass about (celebrity)?" If the other said, "No," the story was not read. However, a listener could call in and say that he/she "gave a rat's ass" about the story, and it would be read.

The hosts also have a number of bits that they do between themselves:

- Sometimes, the two will go off-mic and talk to each other about the show's content, then go back to their mic's with a "Readyyyyyy...BREAK!" and clapping, as in a football huddle.
- If the two are discussing a topic that they both find distasteful or ridiculous, they will sometimes state that the problem will be fixed when they become "Vice Presidents of Everything!"
- If one starts talking over the other by accident, they will usually stop and say in unison, "Oh no! WE'RE TALKING AT THE SAME TIME!"
- When Hamilton cannot pronounce a name he calls it "Some guy named Bob" or "Some place named Bob".
- The Arkansas Democrat-Gazette, Arkansas's state newspaper, is usually called "The Old Testament".
- KLEC (now known as KOLL, the first radio station in Little Rock which carried the show, is always referred to as "the station whose name we no longer speak" because of the hosts' being fired from there.
- During the "Head Up Your Ass Headlines" segment, Corey or Jay will occasionally repeat a story from a previous day. Upon realizing the mistake, a recording is played of a viewer saying something like "Alright, dumb-ass, we've already heard this one". After the recording, Corey and Jay will say "Thanks, Logan" in unison.

In 2002, Deitz and Hamilton put together a CD titled Part of the Problem!, which contained several older pieces of material. The CD was sold through the show's website. A follow-up CD was planned, but the project was put on indefinite hiatus after KLEC dropped the show.
