= Arkansas Arboretum =

Arboretum in Pinnacle Mountain State Park, Arkansas

Coordinates: 34.836°N 92.480°W

The Arkansas Arboretum is a 71-acre (29 ha) arboretum within Pinnacle Mountain State Park in Little Rock, Arkansas, United States. Situated below Pinnacle Mountain along the Little Maumelle River, the arboretum's flora and tree plantings correspond to Arkansas's six geographical regions, ranging from the flat-topped hills and steep valleys of the Ozark Plateau to the flat bottomland and tallgrass prairies of the Mississippi alluvial plain, with a 0.6-mile (1 km) paved interpretive trail.

== See also ==
- List of botanical gardens in the United States
