= KMJX =

Radio station in Conway–Little Rock, Arkansas

Coordinates: 34.798°N 92.493°W

- Conway, Arkansas; United States
- Broadcast area: Little Rock (Central Arkansas)
- Frequency: 105.1 MHz (HD Radio)
- Branding: 105.1 The Wolf

Programming
- Format: Classic country

Ownership
- Owner: iHeartMedia, Inc.; (iHM Licenses, LLC)
- Sister stations: KDJE, KHKN, KSSN

History
- First air date: June 1, 1967
- Former call signs: KVEE-FM (1967–1977); KKLF (1977–1980)
- Call sign meaning: sounds like "Magic" (former branding)

Technical information
- Licensing authority: FCC
- Facility ID: 39689
- Class: C1
- ERP: 81,000 watts
- HAAT: 321 meters (1,053 ft)

Links
- Public license information: Public file; LMS
- Webcast: Listen live (via iHeartRadio)
- Website: 1051thewolf.iheart.com

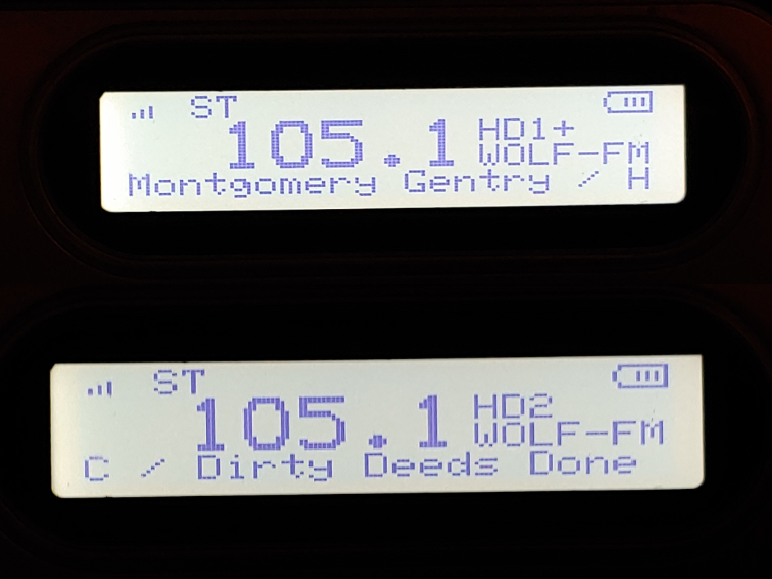
KMJX broadcasting in HD with all of the subchannels.

KMJX (105.1 FM) is a radio station in Little Rock, Arkansas. It has been on the air since 1967, making it one of the oldest stations to broadcast in Little Rock. The station's studios are located in West Little Rock, and the transmitter tower is located on Shinall Mountain, near the Chenal Valley neighborhood of Little Rock. KMJX has been 105.1 "The Wolf" broadcasting a classic country format since 2008.

== History ==
Originally known as Magic 105, playing the classic rock format, with Tommy Smith's Rock and Roll breakfast in the morning. For most of its run it was always among top five stations in the Little Rock market. However, ratings began to slip in the late 2000s. On February 22, 2008, KMJX began stunting with all-Beatles in preparation of a frequency-swap with 106.7FM KHKN "The Wolf", and a classic country format, and KHKN and became TOM FM playing "variety hits" or "adult hits," similar to Jack FM stations in other parts of the country.KKPT "94.1 The Point" was the only remaining Classic Rock station in Little Rock until KLRG signed on as a classic rock station in 2019.

KMJX broadcasts in HD. KMJX is licensed by the FCC to broadcast a HD digital signal.

The Classic Rock Channel formerly broadcast on its HD-2 subcarrier and streams via the iHeart radio app.
