= KKPT =

Classic rock radio station in Little Rock, Arkansas

Coordinates: 34.799°N 92.496°W

- Little Rock, Arkansas; United States
- Broadcast area: Little Rock (Central Arkansas)
- Frequency: 94.1 MHz
- Branding: The Point 94.1

Programming
- Language: English
- Format: Classic rock

Ownership
- Owner: Signal Media; (Signal Media of Arkansas, Inc.)
- Sister stations: KABZ, KBZU

History
- First air date: October 26, 1960
- Former call signs: KMMK (1960–1973); KEZQ (1973–1976); KLPQ (1976–1983); KHLT (1983–1988); KHLT-FM (1988–1989); KHLT (1989–1994)
- Call sign meaning: Point

Technical information
- Licensing authority: FCC
- Facility ID: 60364
- Class: C
- ERP: 100,000 watts
- HAAT: 488 meters (1,601 ft)

Links
- Public license information: Public file; LMS
- Webcast: Listen live
- Website: kkpt.com

KKPT (94.1 FM) is an American commercial radio station located in Little Rock, Arkansas. KKPT broadcasts a classic rock music format branded as "The Point 94.1". The station is owned by Signal Media and the broadcast license held by Signal Media of Arkansas, Inc. The station's studios are located west of the downtown area along the south shore of the Arkansas River (David D. Terry Lake), and the transmitter tower is located on Shinall Mountain, near the Chenal Valley neighborhood of Little Rock.

== History ==
This station originally broadcast from the antenna on the side of the Tower Building in downtown Little Rock as KMMK, also known as "K-Rose", a classical/easy listening format. In 1973, Bernie Mann/Mann Media, purchased the station, changed the calls to KEZQ and moved the tower out west to Shinall Mountain, and eventually increased the ERP/tower height to cover the entire metro. The station aired the Bonneville "Beautiful Music" format, and did well.

Mann Media sold the station to Multimedia in 1976 along with the other station he owned, KALO 1250 to Ron Curtis, who had purchased Dan Garner's KLAZ, 98.5 FM. Multimedia changed the 94.1 FM call letter and format shortly after closing to KLPQ (KQ-94) and launched a rock format. The market was in an uproar for quite some time, while the beautiful music format was aired in mid-days and evenings on Ted Snider's KARN 920 AM.

In 1978, Ed Muniz from New Orleans purchased 100.3 FM in Jacksonville and purchased the "intellectual property" from Gary Fries/GM of KLPQ-FM, and launched FM-100/KEZQ. KLPQ survived until late 1983 when Philip Jonsson from Dallas purchased the station, and launched KHLT "K-Lite".

In 1994, adult contemporary KHLT made the change to "The Point", a 70s-based classic hits format, which was an early hybrid of Classic Top-40 (Oldies) and classic rock. The station was assigned the call sign KKPT by the Federal Communications Commission on June 17, 1994. When Magic 105 FM left the harder edge classic rock format for "We Play Everything" Tom-FM in early 2008, The Point was left as the lone classic rock station in Little Rock until 2019, when KLRG signed on as a classic rock station.
