= Magic 105 (Northern Ireland) =

Magic 105 FM
Northern Ireland
- Broadcast area: Northern Ireland
- Frequency: 105.1 MHz

Programming
- Format: Adult Contemporary

Ownership
- Owner: Magic Productions

History
- First air date: March 1999

Links
- Website: www.magic105.net

Magic 105 was a pirate "border blaster" radio station broadcasting to Northern Ireland from the Republic of Ireland. It operated from 1999 to 2007.

The station format was "Hot Adult Contemporary" (Hot AC) and only played songs from the 1970s and 1980s. The exception to this rule was during its "Afterhours" show (9pm-midnight) when a mixture of classic love songs and modern chill-out tunes were played.

From a transmission site in County Monaghan, Magic 105 broadcast across the border into Northern Ireland. The original transmitter and mast was located at "Alien Mountain", so called due to alleged UFO activity. The real name of the area is known as Greagh, approx 2 miles northwest of Carrickroe, County Monaghan. Due to the remote location of the Alien Mountain transmission site, a satellite ADSL service was used to maintain the automation computer's playlists and provide a live streaming facility for presenters to present live shows from various locations.

The station had links with other border stations such as: Energy 106, Galaxy 107 and Storm 106.

The last broadcast from Magic 105 was on 11 May 2007 when the station's transmitter was seized by ComReg from Bragan Mountain, close to the original Greagh site.
