= Shinall Mountain =

Summit in Pulaski County, Arkansas

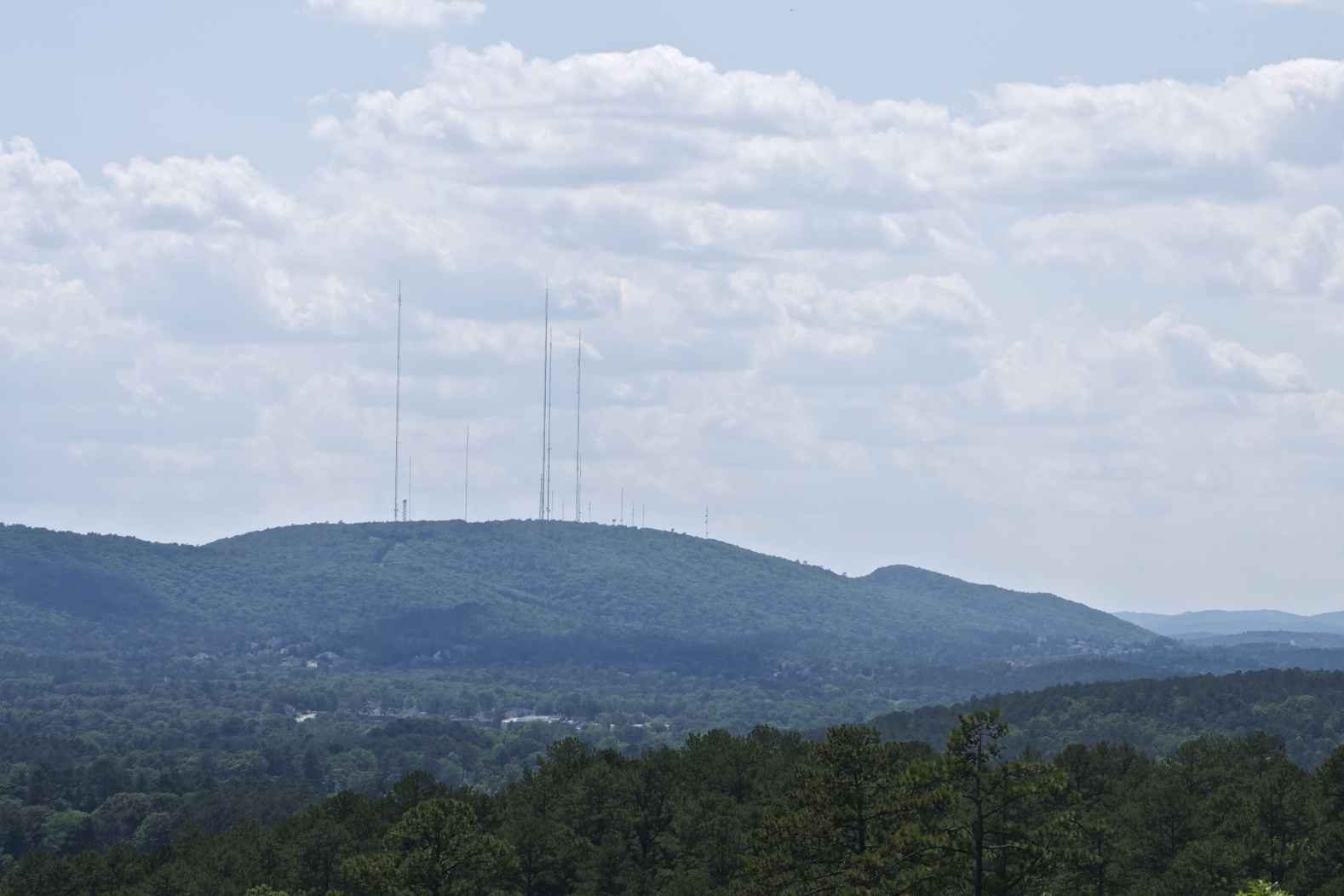

Highest point
- Elevation: 1056 NAVD 88
- Prominence: 510 ft (160 m)
- Isolation: 10.02 mi (16.13 km)
- Coordinates: 34°47′55″N 92°29′49″W

Geography
- Location within Arkansas
- Location: Pulaski County, Arkansas
- Country: United States
- Parent range: Ouachita Mountains, U.S. Interior Highlands
- Topo map(s): USGS Pinnacle Mountain and Ferndale

Shinall Mountain is a peak in Pulaski County, Arkansas, located in the foothills of the Ouachita Mountains on the western edge of Little Rock, the capital and most populous city of Arkansas. At an elevation of 1,056 feet (322 m) above mean sea level, it is the highest natural point in Pulaski County. Shinall Mountain is made of Carboniferous rocks, and plant fossils can sometimes be found in the blue-hued black shales comprising the sides of its bluff.

== Etymology ==
"Shinall" is a corruption of the French name "Chenault", the surname of a family (consisting of brothers Elijah Nelson Chenault and Benjamin Franklin Chenault, and their respective families) that settled near the base of Shinall Mountain before the American Civil War. Another derivation of the surname, "Chenal", is used for two related locations in western Pulaski County: Chenal Valley, a 4,800-acre (7.5 sq mi) upscale planned community in west Little Rock—which is adjacent to Shinall Mountain, and Chenal Parkway, a mostly divided four-lane thoroughfare (that actually scales Shinall Mountain) connecting Highways 10 and 300 to Little Rock's Financial Centre District. The Deltic Timber Corporation, who develops and manages Chenal Valley, chose the name as a foreign branding strategy. Because of the spelling and identical pronunciation, "Shinall" is often misspelled "Chenal" when referring to the peak.

== Geography ==
Shinall Mountain is located approximately 3 miles (4.8 km) south of Pinnacle Mountain. Because Pinnacle Mountain is steeper, it appears higher than Shinall Mountain, despite it actually being 55 feet lower (at an elevation of 1,011 feet [308 m]). According to the Geographic Names Information System (GNIS), Shinall Mountain is a summit.

== Broadcast stations transmitting from Shinall Mountain ==
The peak of Shinall Mountain serves an antenna farm for broadcasters in the Little Rock–Pine Bluff Designated Market Area (DMA), and is dotted by a number of communications towers housing the transmitter facilities of most of the area's television and FM radio stations as well as cellular telephone carriers, emergency response, weather radio and amateur radio services, which are easily identifiable due to the navigational lights adorning the towers that can be seen for miles. The height of the mountain made it very attractive for broadcasters to maintain transmitter facilities, as the hilly terrain of Central Arkansas makes it difficult for communications signals to transmit at lower elevations without impairment.

The first television antenna on Shinall Mountain was erected in 1955 to house the transmitters of KARK-TV (channel 4) and KTHV (channel 11). The first FM station to transmit from Shinall Mountain was KARK-FM (103.7 FM, now KABZ), which began broadcasting there in 1967. The tallest of the towers standing on the peak is the guyed mast built in 1983 for Fox affiliate KLRT-TV (channel 16), now owned by Mission Broadcasting, which stands at 1,194 feet (364 m).

=== Television ===
The following television stations transmit from Shinall Mountain:

Callsign	Virtual channel	Digital channel	City of license	Affiliation
KARK-TV	4	32	Little Rock	NBC
KATV	7	22	Little Rock	ABC
KTHV	11	12	Little Rock	CBS
KLRT-TV	16	30	Little Rock	Fox
KTVV-LD	18	18	Hot Springs	ShopHQ
KLRA-CD	20	20	Little Rock	Univision
KKYK-CD	30	21	Little Rock	Telemundo
KWMO-LD	34	29	Hot Springs	Defy
KKAP	36	36	Little Rock	Daystar
KENH-LD	41	26	Hot Springs	Shop LC
KARZ-TV	42	28	Little Rock	MyNetworkTV
KMYA-LD	49	25	Sheridan	MeTV

Other stations in the Little Rock–Pine Bluff DMA not listed in the above table transmit from two other locations in Central Arkansas (listed by virtual channel followed by physical channel): KASN (virtual channel 38, digital channel 34; CW) and Arkansas PBS flagship station KETS (virtual channel 2, digital channel 7; PBS) both transmit from the Redfield Tower, located two miles (3.2 km) west-southwest of Redfield in Grant County; Victory Television Network flagship KVTN-DT (virtual channel 25, digital channel 18; religious independent) transmits from a tower located two miles (3.2 km) due west of England in Lonoke County.

Due to that station originally being licensed to Pine Bluff (until 1958) and since-repealed FCC regulations requiring a transmitter to be located within 15 miles (24 km) from a station's city of license, KATV maintained transmitters based in Jefferson County from its 1954 sign-on until 2008, transmitting for most of that timeframe from a 2,000-foot (610 m) tower west-southwest of Redfield (near the present day KASN/KETS tower); the analog transmitter of KETS was also housed on that tower. After the Redfield tower collapsed during guy wire repair work on January 22, 2008, KATV set up a temporary analog transmitter at Shinall Mountain on a backup analog transmitter belonging to KTHV; it later received permission from the Federal Communications Commission (FCC) to permanently relocate its analog and digital transmitters to that tower.

=== Radio ===
The following radio stations transmit from Shinall Mountain:

Callsign	Frequency	City of license	Format
K241AP	96.1 FM	Ferndale	Christian
KABF	88.3 FM	Little Rock	Community
KABZ	103.7 FM	Little Rock	Sports
KBZU	106.7 FM	Benton	Sports
KDXE	101.1 FM	Cammack Village	Conservative talk
KKPT	94.1 FM	Little Rock	Classic rock
KKSP	93.3 FM	Bryant	Contemporary Christian
KLRE-FM	90.5 FM	Little Rock	Classical
KMJX	105.1 FM	Conway	Classic country Classic rock (HD2)
KSSN	95.7 FM	Little Rock	Country; Top 40 (HD2)
KUAR	89.1 FM	Little Rock	Public radio (News/Talk/Jazz)
KURB	98.5 FM	Little Rock	Adult contemporary
WXJ55	162.550 MHz	Little Rock	NOAA Weather Radio

In addition to commercial and non-commercial radio stations, the peak also houses the main office and three repeater transmitters (transmitting at 146.940, 147.300 and 444.200 MHz) belonging to Central Arkansas Radio Emergency Net (CAREN), an emergency communications amateur radio service that collaborates with the emergency management agencies of Little Rock, North Little Rock and Pulaski County and other emergency relief entities in Central Arkansas.

== See also ==
- U.S. Interior Highlands
