= KHKN =

Contemporary hit radio station in Maumelle–Little Rock, Arkansas

Coordinates: 34.442°N 92.218°W

- Maumelle, Arkansas; United States
- Broadcast area: Little Rock (Central Arkansas)
- Frequency: 94.9 MHz
- Branding: Hot 94.9

Programming
- Format: Contemporary hit radio
- Affiliations: Premiere Networks

Ownership
- Owner: iHeartMedia, Inc.; (iHM Licenses, LLC)
- Sister stations: KDJE, KMJX, KSSN

History
- First air date: 1971
- Former call signs: KADL-FM (1971–1989); KZLR (1989); KOLL-FM (1989); KOLL (1989–2003); KMSX (2003–2005); KHLR (2005–2009)

Technical information
- Licensing authority: FCC
- Facility ID: 61366
- Class: C
- ERP: 100,000 watts
- HAAT: 562 meters (1,844 ft)

Links
- Public license information: Public file; LMS
- Webcast: Listen live (via iHeartRadio)
- Website: hot949allthehits.iheart.com

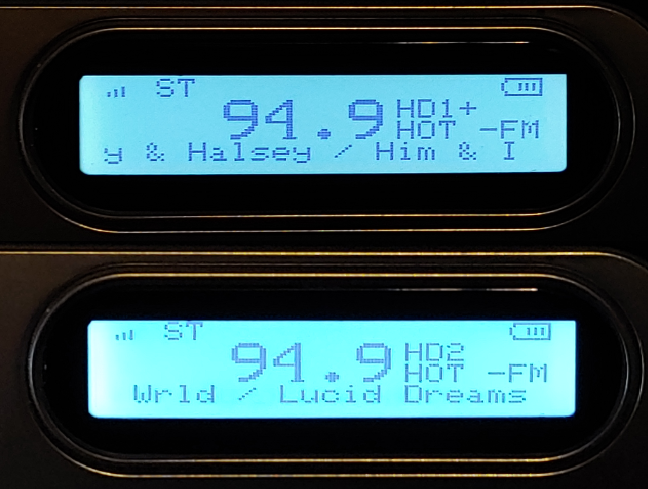
KHKN broadcasting in HD incl. all of the subchannels.

KHKN (94.9 FM) is an American radio station in the Little Rock, Arkansas area. The station's studios are located in West Little Rock, and the transmitter tower is located in Redfield, Arkansas.

KHKN used to broadcast in HD. But KHKN is licensed by the FCC to broadcast an HD digital signal.

== History ==
From 1987 until late 1989, it was KZLR "KZ-95". It had been KADL-FM prior and was off-air for about a year before the launch of AOR "KZ-95". Despite a heavy street presence and a massive promotion blitz, KZ-95 failed to gain traction.

From 1989 to 2003, it was KOLL ("Cool 95"), playing "all oldies all the time" from the 1950s, 1960s, and 1970s.

From 2003 to 2005, it aired an adult contemporary station with the call letters KMSX with the branding "Mix 94.9".

On December 26, 2005, the station changed its call letters to KHLR and began airing an urban contemporary gospel format, branded as "Hallelujah 94.9".

On August 17, 2009, KHLR swapped formats and call letters with KHKN (106.7 FM), adopting an adult hits format, branded as "Tom FM".

On November 1, 2015, KHKN began stunting for the holiday season with Christmas music as "Christmas 94.9". On December 28, 2015, at 6:00 am, KHKN flipped to classic hits as "BIG 94.9". The first song played was "Jump" by Van Halen.

On March 11, 2018, at 9:00 pm, following an audio simulcast of the iHeartRadio Music Awards, KHKN flipped to Top 40/CHR as "Hot 94.9". The flip puts KHKN in competition with longtime Top 40/CHR station KLAL. The last song on "Big" was "So Far Away" by Dire Straits, while the first song on "Hot" was "Finesse" by Bruno Mars featuring Cardi B.

== Previous logos ==
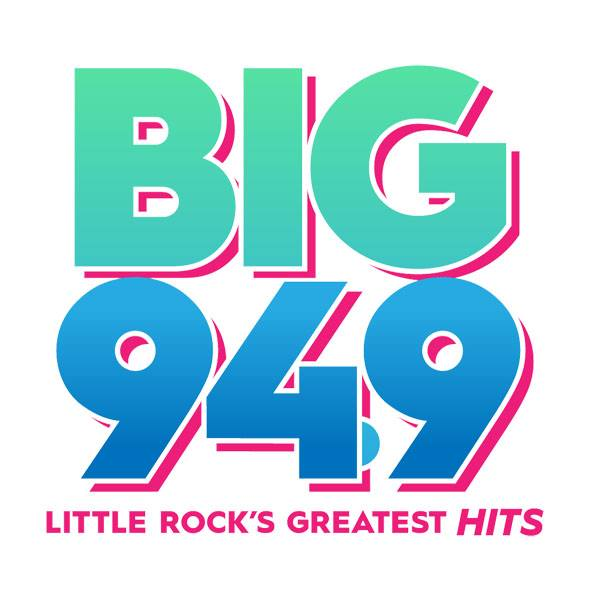
