= KDJE =

Radio station in Jacksonville–Little Rock, Arkansas

Coordinates: 34.798°N 92.493°W

- Jacksonville, Arkansas; United States
- Broadcast area: Little Rock (Central Arkansas)
- Frequency: 100.3 MHz (HD Radio)
- Branding: 100.3 The Edge

Programming
- Format: Active rock

Ownership
- Owner: iHeartMedia, Inc.; (iHM Licenses, LLC)
- Sister stations: KHKN, KMJX, KSSN

History
- First air date: 1969
- Former call signs: KGMR-FM (1969–1979); KEZQ (1979–1986); KEZQ-FM (1986–1992); KDDK (1992–1997); KQAR (1997–2003)
- Call sign meaning: "Edge"

Technical information
- Licensing authority: FCC
- Facility ID: 23025
- Class: C1
- ERP: 85,000 watts
- HAAT: 321 meters (1,053 ft)

Links
- Public license information: Public file; LMS
- Webcast: Listen live (via iHeartRadio)
- Website: edgelittlerock.iheart.com

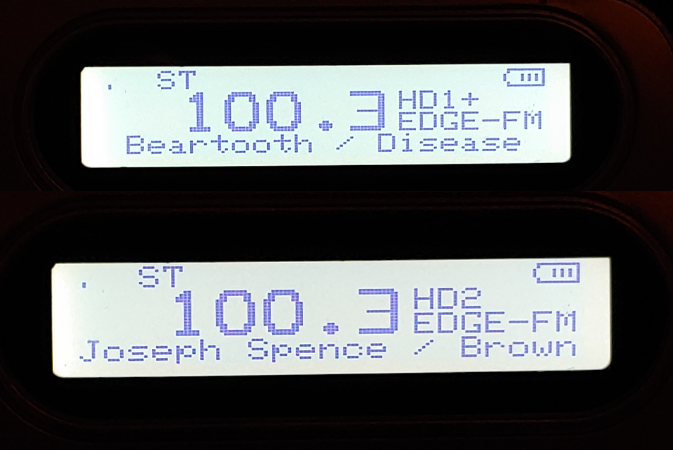
KDJE broadcasting in HD with all of the subchannels.

KDJE (100.3 FM, "100.3 The Edge" or "KDJE Jacksonville" on air) is an active rock radio station located in Little Rock, Arkansas (licensed to suburban Jacksonville). The station's studios are located in West Little Rock, and the transmitter tower is located on Shinall Mountain, near the Chenal Valley neighborhood of Little Rock.

Previous logo

Kevin Cruise is the current program director and Matt Cruz serves as assistant program director. The Edge signed on as a rock station in 2003, where 100.3 previously played hot-contemporary Top 40 music. However, in 2009, the station began incorporating classic heavy metal music by bands such as: Black Sabbath, Mötley Crüe, and also Led Zeppelin and AC/DC into their typical active rock format.
