= Pinnacle Mountain State Park =

State park in Arkansas, United States

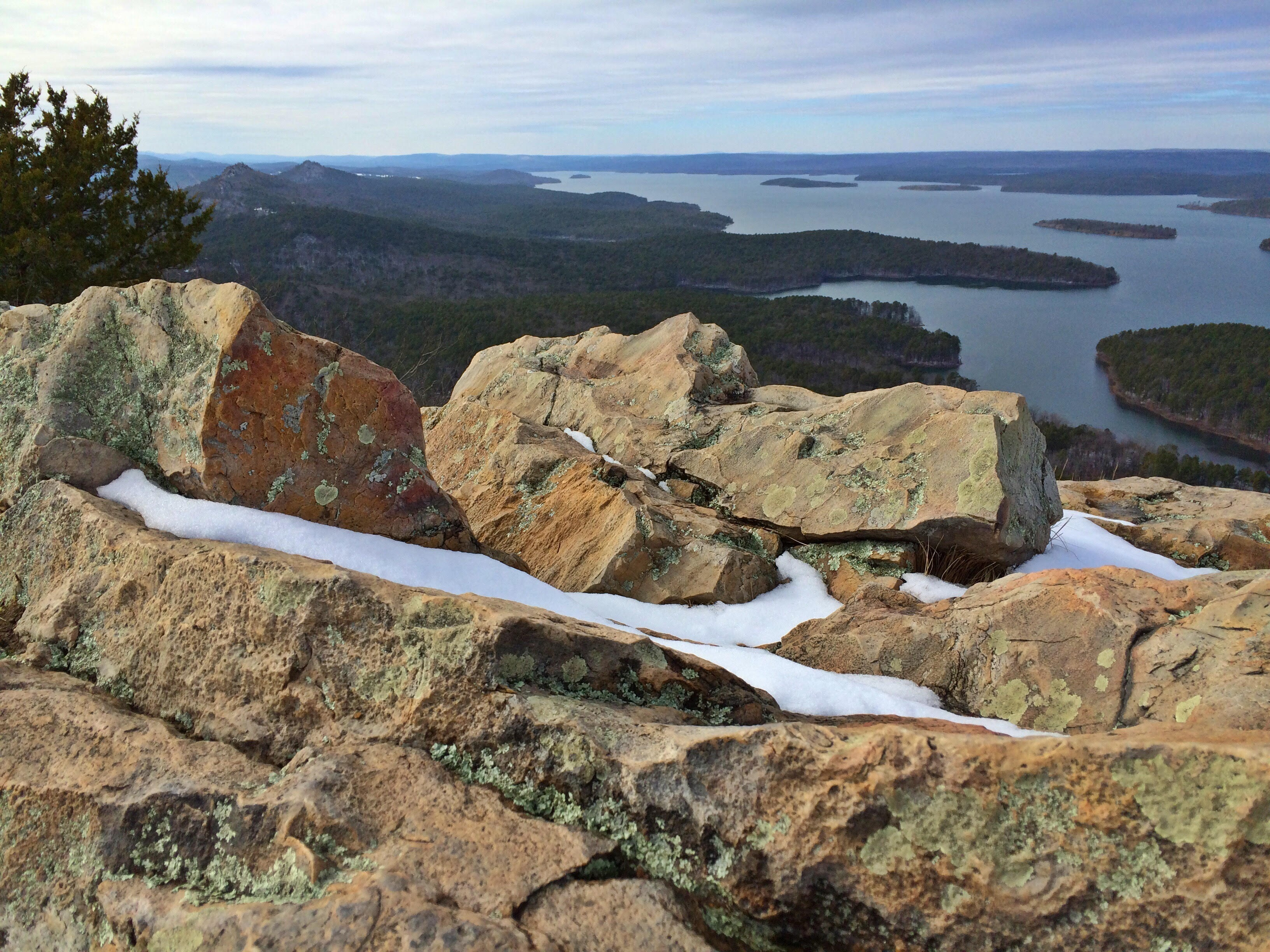
- Lake Maumelle from Pinnacle Mountain

- Location within Arkansas Location within the United States
- Interactive map of Pinnacle Mountain State Park
- Location: Pulaski County, Arkansas, United States
- Coordinates: 34°50′30″N 92°29′42″W
- Area: 2,069 acres (837 ha)
- Established: 1977
- Administrator: Arkansas Department of Parks, Heritage and Tourism
- Website: Official website
- Arkansas State Parks

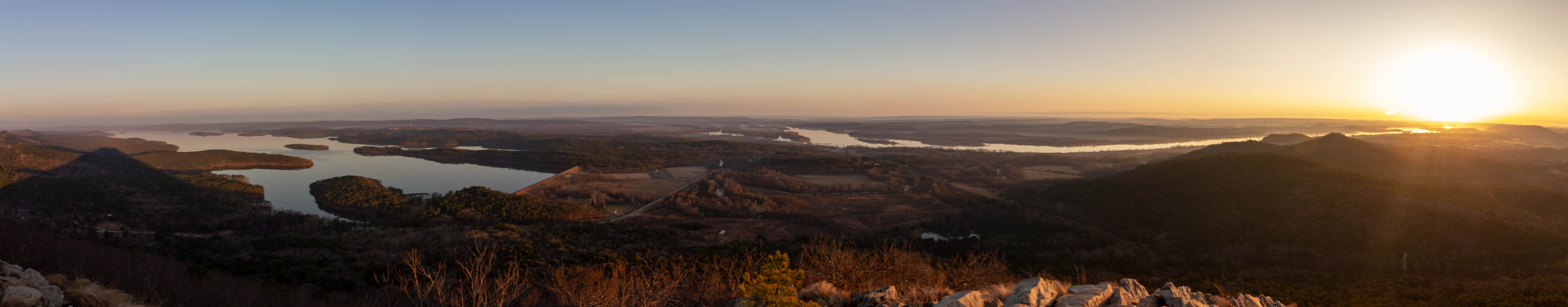
Panorama view from the top of Pinnacle Mountain in Arkansas. The shadow of the mountain is visible.

Pinnacle Mountain State Park is a 2,356-acre state park located in Pulaski County, Arkansas just outside of Little Rock. The main attraction is Pinnacle Mountain, an iconic landmark surrounded by the bottomlands of the Big Maumelle and Little Maumelle rivers.

== History ==
The first people to settle the area referred to Pinnacle Mountain as "Mamelle", the French name for a breast-shaped hill. "Mamelle" eventually became "Maumelle", which is the name used for the Big Maumelle and Little Maumelle rivers, as well as the nearby city of Maumelle. A trip to Pinnacle Mountain was a popular activity in the 1800s. Climbing became even more popular with the construction of the local railroad in the 1890s and common use of the automobile in the 1900s.

Quarrying for sandstone and shale within the modern park began in about 1920. The eastern slope of Pinnacle Mountain was a major source of material for the construction of the Lake Maumelle dam in the 1950s. Located immediately northwest of Pinnacle Mountain, Lake Maumelle is a high-quality raw water supply serving a population of almost 398,000; the reservoir went online in 1958, at least two years after the Big Maumelle River was impounded. In the 1960s, extensive quarrying of sandstone took place at the modern visitor center, the result of which can be seen by the quarry pond.

The idea for a park had been considered for many years, but did not get off the ground until the 1970s. In 1973, the Arkansas General Assembly approved the creation of Pinnacle Mountain State Park. Since then, 2,356 acres have been set aside for various purposes including environmental education, outdoor recreation, and preservation.

== Hiking ==
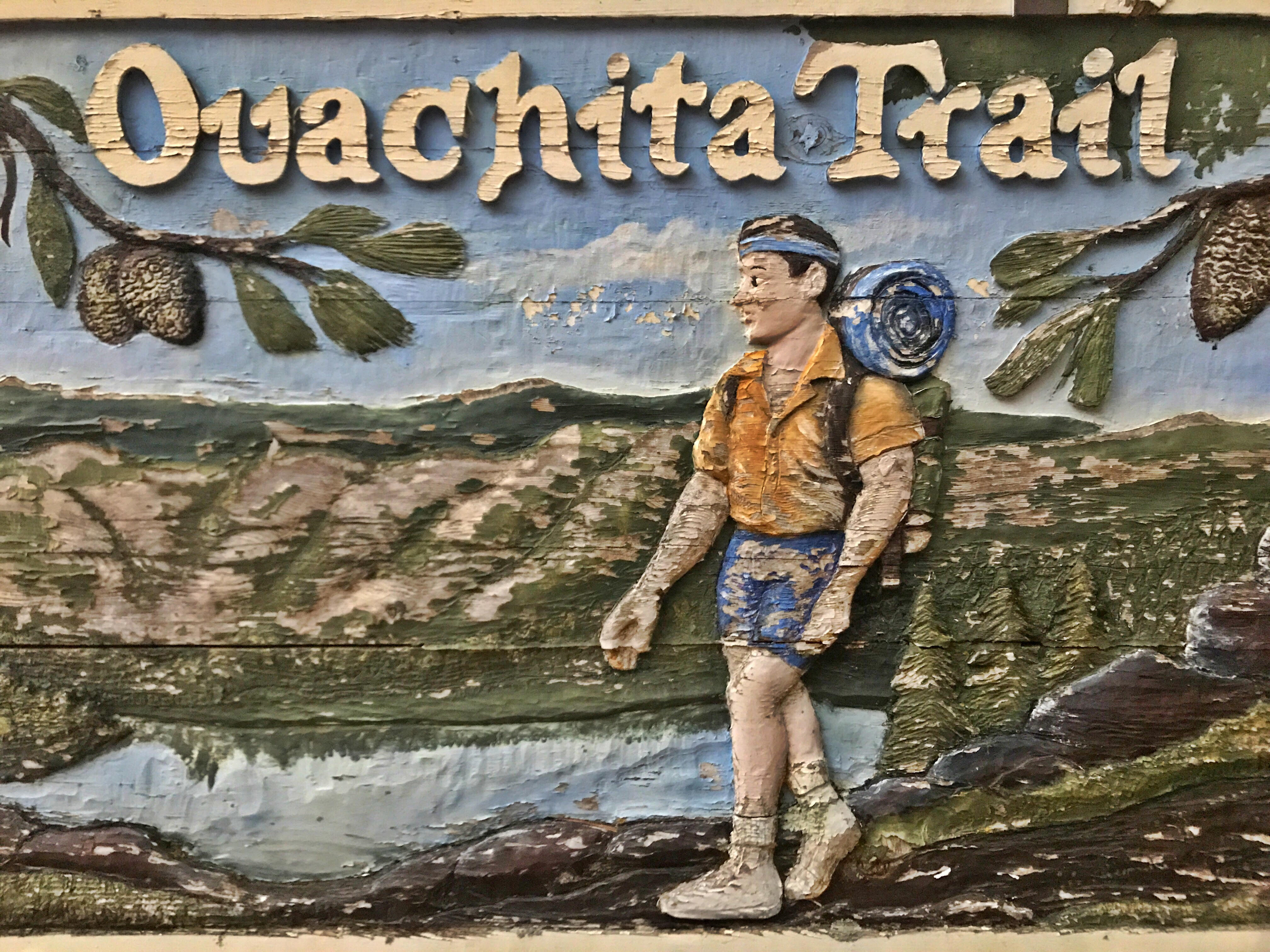
Ouachita Trail sign at Pinnacle Mountain State Park

Pinnacle Mountain State Park features a number of hiking trails.

Trails that start at the West Summit parking lot are the 0.5-mile Kingfisher Trail, which passes by the Little Maumelle River, and the 1.5-mile West Summit Trail (marked by yellow blazes). The West Summit Trail is the standard route up Pinnacle Mountain and is easily one of the most trafficked trails in Arkansas.

Trails that start at the East Summit parking lot are the 1.5-mile East Summit Trail (marked by red and white blazes), which also ascends Pinnacle Mountain, and the 2.5-mile Base Trail (marked by light green blazes). The Base Trail loops completely around the base of Pinnacle Mountain and connects the East Summit trailhead to the West Summit trailhead.

Trails that start at the visitor center are the 2-mile Rocky Valley Trail (marked by green blazes) and the 1-mile East Quarry Trail, a spur of the Rocky Valley Trail. The 223-mile Ouachita Trail (marked by blue blazes) also starts at the visitor center, crosses Pinnacle Valley Road at the East Summit parking lot after 1.5 miles, and overlaps a 0.5-mile section of the Base Trail before continuing west towards Lake Maumelle.

The 0.75-mile Arkansas Trail is located near the center of the Arkansas Arboretum, a 71-acre site exhibiting native Arkansas flora.

== Camping ==
Camping is not allowed inside Pinnacle Mountain State Park, however, it is allowed at Maumelle Park, a nearby public campground operated by the U.S. Army Corps of Engineers.

== Mountain Biking ==
New mountain biking trails opened in 2020. This trail system currently consists of 13 miles including cross-country, downhill, flow, and beginner sections. Called the Monument Trails at Pinnacle Mountain State Park; built with the latest technology to improve ride enjoyment and sustainability. These new trails also take you to places never before accessible in the park. While these trails are optimized for mountain biking, all but a few are open to hiking and trail running. Access/Parking areas: There are 3 parking areas currently, the visitor center has the largest parking area, The Middle Mountain Trailhead has limited parking (where the visitor center road has a "Y" intersection). Also, the lower trailhead where the Visitor Center Road first turns off Pinnacle Valley Road. There is some overflow parking at the Arboretum on Pinnacle Valley Road. Also, when riding the Arkansas River Trail (along Pinnacle Valley Rd) from Two Rivers Park, there is a trailhead at the Pinnacle Mountain State Park sign that will take you to the Jackfork Trail.

== See also ==
- Shinall Mountain

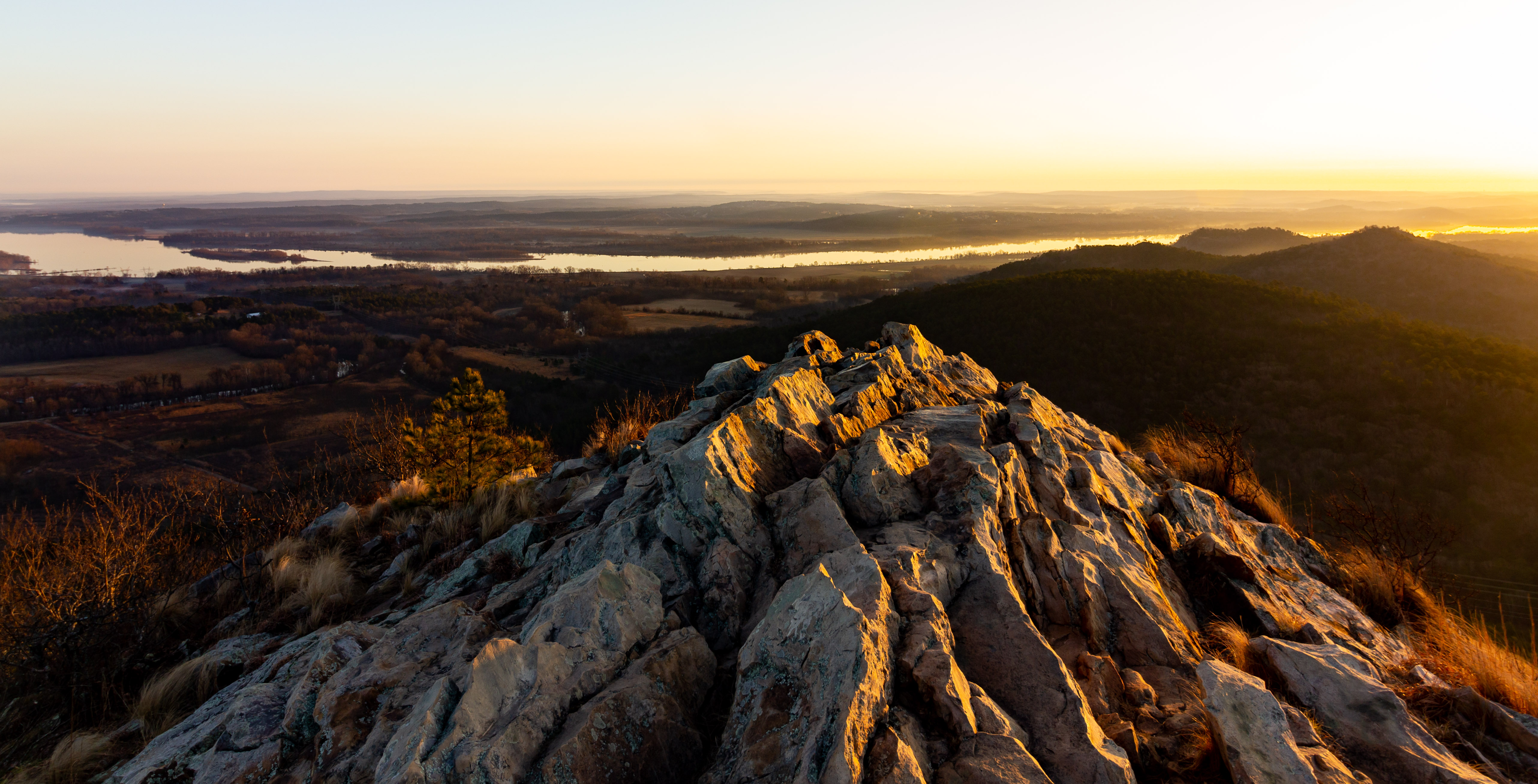
Sunrise at Pinnacle Mountain, Feb 3, 2019. By Nick Gowen
