= KSSN =

Radio station in Little Rock, Arkansas

- Little Rock, Arkansas; United States
- Broadcast area: Little Rock (Central Arkansas)
- Frequency: 95.7 MHz
- Branding: KSSN 96 (Pronounced Kissin)

Programming
- Format: Country
- Affiliations: Premiere Networks

Ownership
- Owner: iHeartMedia, Inc.; (iHM Licenses, LLC)
- Sister stations: KDJE, KHKN, KMJX

History
- First air date: 1966
- Former call signs: KMYO-FM (1966–1976); KXXA (1976–1979)
- Call sign meaning: "Kissin'"

Technical information
- Licensing authority: FCC
- Facility ID: 61363
- Class: C
- ERP: 100,000 watts
- HAAT: 507 meters (1,663 ft)
- Transmitter coordinates: 34.799°N 92.492°W

Links
- Public license information: Public file; LMS
- Webcast: Listen live (via iHeartRadio)
- Website: kssn.iheart.com

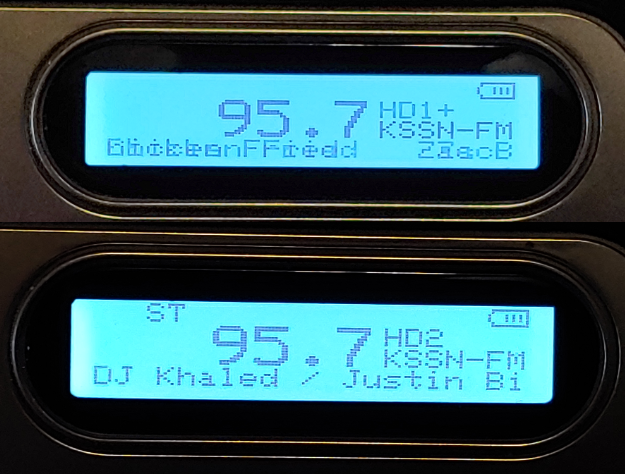
KSSN broadcasting in HD with all of the subchannels.

KSSN (95.7 FM) is a radio station located in Little Rock, Arkansas. The station broadcasts a country format and is under ownership of iHeartMedia, Inc. The station's studios are located in West Little Rock, and the transmitter tower is located on Shinall Mountain, near the Chenal Valley neighborhood of Little Rock.
