= Tommy Smith (DJ) =

American DJ

Tommy Smith (born November 4, 1954), formerly known as “The Outlaw” and “TC Starr”, was a radio DJ in Little Rock, Arkansas. Tommy is most known for his first long-running morning show "The Rock ‘N’ Roll Breakfast" with co-host Big Dave at Magic 105 (105.1 FM), as well as his second long-running morning show "The Show With No Name" with co-host David Bazzel on KABZ 103.7 The Buzz. Smith is a 1972 graduate of Little Rock Central High School, and a veteran of the U.S. Army. Smith announced late in 2021 that he had developed the neuro-immune disorder myasthenia gravis. His final show was December 31 of that year. Fans still refer to Smith as "Outlaw”, and he is considered a legend in central Arkansas radio. Smith has been married for many years to his wife Karen.

Tommy currently hosts a weekly podcast with Big Dave and longtime sidekick, Danny-Joe Crofford. The Rock ‘N’ Roll Breakfast Uncensored Podcast can be heard on Spotify.

== On-air collapse ==
On September 24, 2010 Smith was taken to a hospital after he collapsed during a broadcast of his "Show With No Name". An interview on his struggle with drinking and his life aired on KATV Channel 7, Little Rock, Arkansas.

== Arrest ==
Smith was arrested Thursday May 26, 2011 for several offenses including driving under the influence, possession of a controlled substance, drinking in public, failure to stop after an accident, refusal to submit to a chemical test, crossing the median, and following too close.

Tommy Smith has now recovered after rehabilitation at the Betty Ford Center, and continued as the morning DJ for 103.7 The Buzz in Little Rock, Arkansas until his retirement on December 31, 2021 after forty years in the industry.
