= KDXE (FM) =

Radio station in Cammack Village–Little Rock, Arkansas

- Cammack Village, Arkansas; United States
- Broadcast area: Little Rock (Central Arkansas)
- Frequency: 101.1 MHz
- Branding: 101.1 FM The Answer

Programming
- Language: English
- Format: Conservative talk
- Affiliations: Compass Media Networks; Premiere Networks; Salem Radio Network; Townhall

Ownership
- Owner: Salem Media Group; (Salem Communications Holding Corporation)
- Sister stations: KDIS-FM

History
- Former call signs: KZQA (1991–1994, CP); KDRE (1994–2005); KWBF-FM (2005–2009); KZTS (2009–2018)

Technical information
- Licensing authority: FCC
- Facility ID: 49255
- Class: A
- ERP: 850 watts
- HAAT: 267 meters (876 ft)
- Transmitter coordinates: 34.79886°N 92.49598°W

Links
- Public license information: Public file; LMS
- Webcast: Listen live
- Website: 1011fmtheanswer.com

KDXE (101.1 MHz, "101.1 FM The Answer") is an FM radio station broadcasting a conservative talk format in Little Rock, Arkansas (licensed to enclave Cammack Village). The station is currently owned by Salem Media Group, through licensee Salem Communications Holding Corporation. The station's studios are south of downtown near Philander Smith College, and its transmitter tower is located on Shinall Mountain, near the Chenal Valley neighborhood of Little Rock.

On June 1, 1998, after a 10-day stunt with various genres of music, 101.1 FM signed on as modern rock-formatted "Lick 101" KDRE.

According to FCC filings, the station went silent sometime around November 1, 2008, as the licensee was unable to negotiate an extension of the contract with the owner of the transmitter location. The FCC granted permission to remain silent while the station's owner put together the paperwork to move the transmitter to a new location. The transmitter was moved to a different location, the call sign was changed from KWBF-FM to KZTS, and the format was changed from rhythmic oldies, to adult album alternative, and later a mainstream urban format.

With the exception of the station being the Little Rock affiliate for The Rickey Smiley Morning Show, the station had no on-air personalities. Under its previous format, KZTS' main competitor was longtime heritage urban contemporary outlet KIPR.

On March 13, 2018, it was announced by media sources that Flinn Broadcasting Corporation would sell Urban KZTS to Salem Communications for $1.1 million plus a time brokerage agreement before closing. On April 2, 2018, Salem switched the station's format and branding to their Conservative Talk "The Answer", and changed the station's call sign to KDXE on April 8, 2018. Salem's acquisition of the station was consummated on June 25, 2018.
