= KZTS (AM) =

Radio station in North Little Rock–Little Rock, Arkansas

- North Little Rock, Arkansas; United States
- Broadcast area: Little Rock–Central Arkansas
- Frequency: 1380 kHz
- Branding: Rejoice 105.5

Programming
- Format: Gospel music

Ownership
- Owner: Salem Media Group; (Salem Communications Holding Corporation)

History
- First air date: April 19, 1957; 69 years ago
- Former call signs: KNLR (1957–1959); KDXE (1959–1981); KAUL (1981–1986); KPAL (1986–1996); KRNN (1996–2003); KDXE (2003–2018)
- Call sign meaning: disambiguation of "Streets" (previous branding)

Technical information
- Licensing authority: FCC
- Facility ID: 665
- Class: B
- Power: 5,000 watts (day); 2,500 watts (night)
- Transmitter coordinates: 34°52′49.00″N 92°14′0.10″W
- Translators: 103.3 K277DP (Little Rock); 105.5 K288EZ (Little Rock)

Links
- Public license information: Public file; LMS
- Webcast: Listen Live
- Website: rejoicelittlerock.com

KZTS (1380 AM) is a commercial radio station in Little Rock, Arkansas (licensed to North Little Rock in the Little Rock radio market). The station is owned by Salem Media Group, and broadcasts a gospel music radio format.

Programming is simulcast on a translator station to allow Little Rock listeners to hear the station on FM. K288EZ broadcasts at 105.5 MHz and K277DP broadcasts at 103.3 MHz.

== History ==
The station signed on as KNLR on April 19, 1957. The call sign reflected the city of license, North Little Rock. It was a daytimer and was owned by the Arkansas Valley Broadcasting Company. KNLR was powered at 1,000 watts in the daytime but had to sign-off at sunset to avoid interfering with other radio stations on 1380 AM. In 1959, it changed its call sign to KDXE to reflect its "Dixie"-style country music format.

In the 1980s, the station got authorization from the Federal Communications Commission to increase daytime power to 5,000 watts and add nighttime authorization, at 2,500 watts. In 1986, the station switched to a children's radio format as KPAL. It later became an affiliate of Radio Disney as KRNN on April 1, 1999.

In 2003, the station returned to the call sign KDXE and flipped to a sports radio format, as an affiliate of ESPN Radio. On December 18, 2008, radio industry website 100000watts.com reported that KDXE had gone silent, but no explanation was given for this.

On November 3, 2009, the radio station once again returned to the air, this time as a talk radio station, featuring nationally syndicated shows including Michael Savage, Laura Ingraham, Dr. Laura Schlessinger, Jerry Doyle, Rusty Humphries and Phil Hendrie.

Mark Nolte served as general manager and co-broker with Patrick Communications to complete the sale to NC Communications.

A local marketing agreement (LMA) to program the station began on or about January 1, 2010. The station was sold to NC Communications on December 31, 2010, with Duane Nickols serving as general manager. Nickols, a longtime veteran broadcaster, continues to consult on marketing and programming for the group part-time from his home.

NC Communications bought 105.5 FM to serve as an FM translator station.

On January 31, 2014, KDXE changed their format to urban adult contemporary, branded as "Hot 105.5".

On April 1, 2018, NC Communications made an exchange with Salem Communications. The station at AM 1380 changed its branding to "Streetz 105.5", and its call sign to KZTS on April 8, 2018. The original KZTS, at 101.1, was sold to Salem Communications to become talk radio station KDXE. The sale to Salem was consummated on July 26, 2018.

On September 1, 2018, KZTS changed their format from urban contemporary to gospel, branded as "Rejoice 105.5".
