= Pinnacle Mountain (Arkansas) =

Mountain in Pulaski County, Arkansas

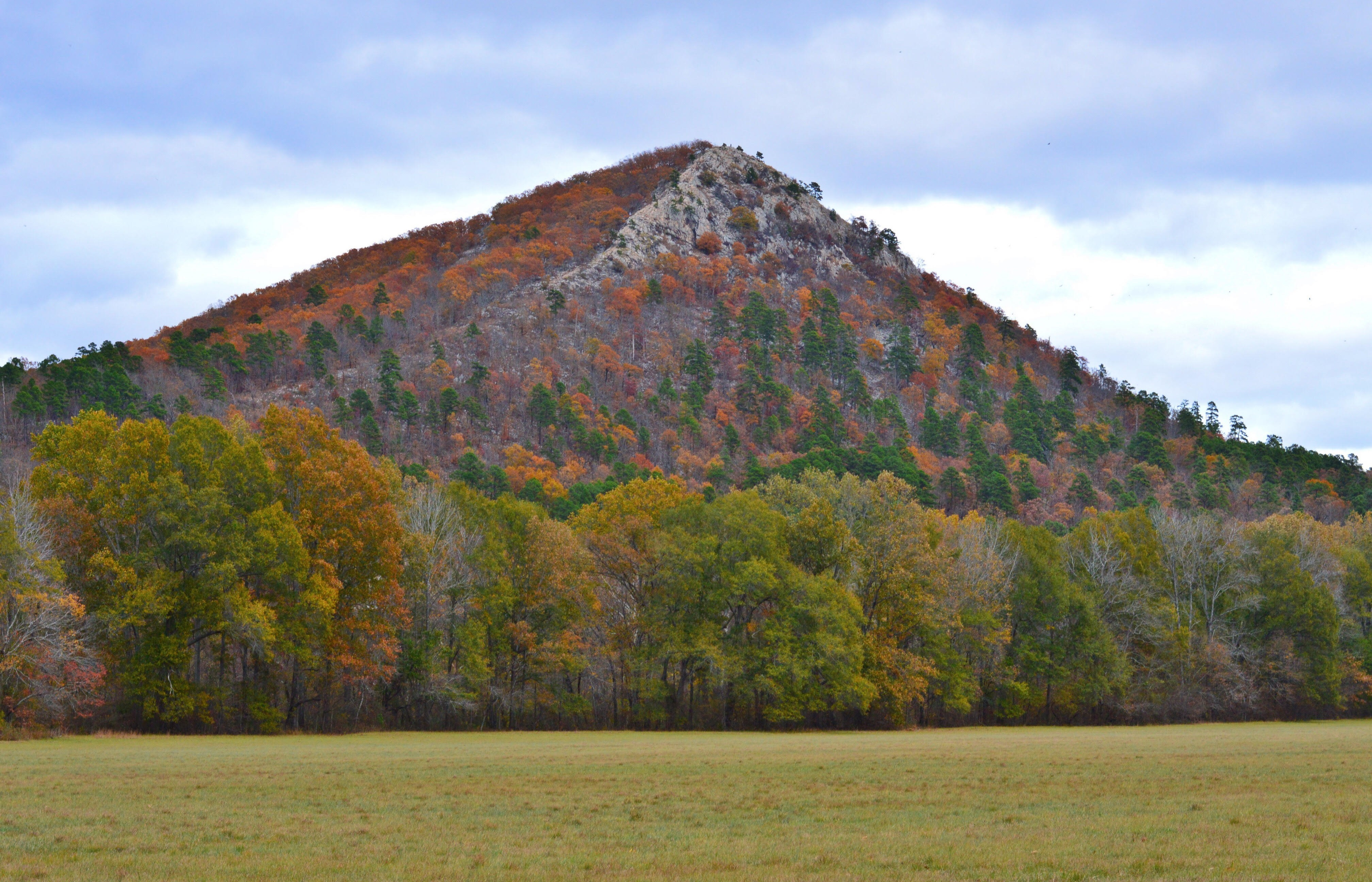
- Pinnacle Mountain as seen from Highway 300

Highest point
- Elevation: 1,011 ft (308 m) NAVD 88
- Coordinates: 34°50′29″N 92°29′09″W

Geography
- Location within Arkansas
- Location: Pulaski County, Arkansas, U.S.
- Parent range: Ouachita Mountains, U.S. Interior Highlands
- Topo map: USGS Pinnacle Mountain

Pinnacle Mountain is a 1,011-foot (308 m) summit and the second-highest natural point in Pulaski County, Arkansas, United States; it is also the primary attraction of the 2,356-acre (953 ha) Pinnacle Mountain State Park. Located in the foothills of the Ouachita Mountains approximately 13 miles (21 km) northwest of downtown Little Rock, Arkansas, Pinnacle Mountain is one of the most iconic landforms of the U.S. Interior Highlands.

== Geography ==
Pinnacle Mountain is located between the Maumelle River to the north and the Little Maumelle River to the south. The Maumelle River empties into the Arkansas River at Maumelle Park approximately 2.8 miles (4.5 km) east of Pinnacle Mountain. The Little Maumelle River empties into the Arkansas River at Two Rivers Park approximately 6.6 miles (10.6 km) east of Pinnacle Mountain.

The United States Board on Geographic Names once defined a mountain as any landform greater than 1,000 feet (305 m) of local relief and a hill as any landform less than 1,000 feet (305 m) of local relief. Though Pinnacle Mountain is 1,011 feet (308 m) above mean sea level, it is only 761 feet (232 m) of local relief, i.e., 761 feet (232 m) higher than the nearby Arkansas River, which is 250 feet (76 m) above mean sea level. Due to broad disagreement over this naming convention, the classification system was abandoned in the early 1970s. According to the Geographic Names Information System (GNIS), Pinnacle Mountain is a summit, which is defined as "a prominent elevation rising above the surrounding level of the Earth's surface", but does not include mountains or hills, among other things. Its proximity to the Arkansas River and steep south slopes make Pinnacle Mountain a prominent landform observable from many areas in Pulaski County.

== Geology ==
Pinnacle Mountain is not a volcano. Despite resembling a cinder cone (a small conical volcano), Pinnacle Mountain is composed of sedimentary rock, the Jackfork Sandstone. Named after Jackfork Mountain in Oklahoma, the Jackfork Sandstone is an exceptionally hard quartzitic sandstone; weathered surfaces are usually beige in color, while fresh surfaces tend to be much lighter. The Jackfork Sandstone can exhibit conchoidal fracturing, a defining characteristic of quartz, which, along with its great hardness, suggests the possibility of a metasandstone.

The sediment that eventually formed the Jackfork Sandstone was deposited in the ocean prior to the Ouachita Orogeny, the event that formed the Ouachita Mountains. During the early Pennsylvanian, slope collapse on the edge of the continental shelf emptied vast quantities of sand into a deep trough, which was slowly buried and transformed into sandstone. During the middle Pennsylvanian, the collision of two continents, Laurasia and Llanoria, resulted in uplift of the Ouachita Mountains, completing the assemblage of the supercontinent Pangea. The Ouachita Mountains have been above sea level undergoing erosion since the late Pennsylvanian, approximately 300 million years ago. Pinnacle Mountain is a remnant of the rock deep within this ancient mountain range.

== Hiking ==
Two routes ascend Pinnacle Mountain: the 1.5-mile (2.4 km) West Summit Trail (designated by yellow markers), which starts at the West Summit parking lot off of Arkansas Highway 300, and the 1.5-mile (2.4 km) East Summit Trail (designated by red and white markers), which starts at the East Summit parking lot off of Pinnacle Valley Road. The West Summit Trail tends to see considerably more foot traffic than the East Summit Trail, primarily because the East Summit Trail involves difficult class 2 scrambling (i.e., the use of hands is frequently required for balance and to test the stability of boulders). Both, however, receive a large number of visitors due to their proximity to Little Rock. The 3-mile (4.8 km) Base Trail (designated by light green markers) loops completely around the base of Pinnacle Mountain and connects the West Summit and East Summit trailheads. The 223-mile (359 km) Ouachita National Recreation Trail (designated by blue markers) overlaps a 0.5-mile (0.8 km) section of the Base Trail and continues another 1.5 miles (2.4 km) to the (now closed) Pinnacle Mountain State Park Visitor Center after crossing Pinnacle Valley Road at the East Summit parking lot.

== See also ==
- Ouachita Mountains
- U.S. Interior Highlands
