= Chenal Valley =

Neighborhood in Little Rock, Arkansas

Coordinates: 34.7698°N 92.4588°W

Chenal Valley (/ʃɪˈnɔːl/ shin-AWL) is a sizable and more recently developed section of Little Rock, Arkansas, located in the west-central part of the city and serves as a major economic and residential hub in west Little Rock. Its name is derived from the area's Shinall Mountain, but Deltic Timber Corporation (now PotlatchDeltic), a major early developer of the area, opted to alter the name to mimic French language as part of a strategy (known as foreign branding) to orient the residential and commercial development toward upper-class population segments.

The main thoroughfare is Chenal Parkway, mostly a divided four-lane path chiefly connecting Highway 10 to west Little Rock's Financial Centre business district. Chenal Parkway's northwestern terminus is just north of Arkansas 10 at Highway 300, near the Pinnacle Valley neighborhood. The southeastern terminus lies at Autumn Road at a transition to Financial Centre Parkway, with continuation to a conversion into Interstate 630 at Shackleford Road.

Chenal Valley’s rapid development started in 1990 with the establishment of Chenal Country Club and the construction of some of the area's current crop of homes. Those first houses, as well as a limited number of apartment and condominium complexes, can be found scattered throughout the wooded sections of Chenal Valley.

Several mass-market retailers populate Chenal's eastern commercial corridor near the Financial Centre area. Its western commercial corridor boasts the Promenade at Chenal, which includes an IMAX theater, and major clothing retailers and stores.

Census Tract 42.13, located in the area, has a median household income of $185,667 - the highest in Arkansas.
