= Mass media in Little Rock, Arkansas =

The following is a list of media outlets—including print, radio, television and the internet—located in Little Rock, Arkansas, United States.

== Print ==
=== Daily ===
- Arkansas Democrat-Gazette
- Daily Record

=== Weekly ===
- Air Scoop (published at Little Rock Air Force Base)
- Arkansas Business
- Arkansas Catholic
- Arkansas Times
- Baptist Trumpet (published by the Baptist Missionary Association of Arkansas)
- El Latino
- Hola! Arkansas

=== Community ===
- Beebe News
- The Daily Citizen (Searcy)
- The Leader (Jacksonville)
- Log Cabin Democrat (Conway)
- Pine Bluff Commercial
- Saline Courier (Benton)
- Sheridan Headlight
- Sherwood Voice

=== Magazines ===
- Frank: Academics for the Real World
- Oxford American

=== Defunct ===
- The American Guide
- Arkansas Advocate
- Arkansas Banner
- Arkansas Carrier
- Arkansas Farmer
- Arkansas Freeman
- Arkansas Gazette
- Arkansas Mansion
- Arkansas Recorder
- Arkansas Star
- Arkansas State Press
- Arkansas Supreme Court Advance Sheets
- Arkansas Survey-Journal
- Arkansas Temperance Journal
- Arkansas Times and Advocate
- Arkansas Traveller (Ku Klux Klan newspaper published in Little Rock and El Dorado)
- Arkansas Tribune
- Arkansas Union Labor Bulletin
- Arkansas Weekly Sentinel
- Arkansas Weekly Times
- The Arkansas World
- Cabot Star-Herald (Cabot)
- Daily Legal News
- Daily Republican
- Das Arkansas Echo (German language newspaper)
- Independent Democrat
- Inclusion Magazine
- Legislative Digest
- Little Rock Free Press
- National Democrat (Unionist Civil War newspaper)
- North Little Rock Times
- Pine Bluff Weekly Herald
- Political Intelligencer
- Spectrum Weekly
- Spirit of the Age
- True Democrat
- Unconditional Union
- Woman's Chronicle

== Digital media ==
- Talk Business & Politics

== Television ==
As of September 2021, the Little Rock–Pine Bluff market is ranked as the 59th largest American television market by Nielsen Media Research.

=== Full-power ===
- 2 KETS Little Rock (Arkansas TV/PBS)
- 4 KARK-TV Little Rock (NBC)
- 6 KEMV Mountain View (Arkansas TV/PBS)
- 7 KATV Little Rock (ABC)
- 9 KETG Arkadelphia (Arkansas TV/PBS)
- 11 KTHV Little Rock (CBS)
- 16 KLRT-TV Little Rock (Fox)
- 25 KVTN-DT Pine Bluff (Religious independent)
- 26 KVTH-DT Hot Springs (Religious independent)
- 36 KKAP Little Rock (Daystar)**
- 38 KASN Pine Bluff (The CW)
- 42 KARZ-TV Little Rock (Independent with MyNetworkTV)

=== Low-power ===
- 18 KTVV-LD Hot Springs
- 19 KIPB-LD Pine Bluff (NRB TV)
- 20 KLRA-CD Little Rock (Univision)
- 27 K27JP-D Little Rock
- 30 KKYK-CD Little Rock (Telemundo)
- 30 K16IP-D Bonnerdale (3ABN)
- 34 KWMO-LD Hot Springs
- 39 K23OW-D Hot Springs
- 41 KENH-LD Hot Springs
- 49 KMYA-LD Sheridan (MeTV)

=== Defunct ===
- KFOY-TV Hot Springs (1961–1963)
- KLEP Newark (1985–2005)
- KRTV Little Rock (1953–1954)
- KRZB-TV Hot Springs (1986–1988)

== Radio ==
As of September 2021, the Little Rock–Pine Bluff market is ranked as the 92nd largest American radio market by Nielsen Audio.

=== AM ===
- 690 KAFN Benton (Classic rock)
- 760 KMTL Sherwood (Regional Mexican)
- 880 KLRG Sheridan (Classic rock)
- 920 KARN Little Rock (Sports/WW1)
- 1050 KJBN Little Rock (Urban gospel)
- 1090 KAAY Little Rock (Christian radio)
- 1190 KASZ White Hall (Classic rock)
- 1250 KFOG Little Rock (Urban contemporary-KIPR simulcast)
- 1380 KZTS North Little Rock (Gospel)
- 1440 KTUV Little Rock (Spanish Variety)
- 1530 KVDW England (Southern gospel/Talk)

=== FM ===
- 88.3 KABF Little Rock (Community radio)
- 89.1 KUAR Little Rock (Public radio/NPR/talk/jazz)
- 90.5 KLRE-FM Little Rock (Classical)
- 90.9 KNFR Gravel Ridge (Christian radio)
- 91.1 KANX Sheridan (AFR Hybrid)
- 91.7 KBDO Des Arc (AFR Talk)
- 92.3 KIPR Pine Bluff (Urban contemporary)
- 92.7 KCON Vilonia (Classic rock)
- 93.3 KKSP Bryant (Christian adult contemporary)
- 94.1 KKPT Little Rock (Classic rock)
- 94.9 KHKN Maumelle (Contemporary hit radio)
- 95.7 KSSN Little Rock (Country music)
- 96.5 KHTE-FM England (Urban contemporary)
- 96.9 KWLR Bigelow (K-Love)
- 98.1 KINC-LP Little Rock (Community/variety)
- 98.5 KURB Little Rock (Adult contemporary)
- 98.9 KWCP-LP Little Rock (Rhythm and blues)
- 99.1 KILB-LP Paron (Christian radio)
- 99.5 KDIS-FM Little Rock (Christian radio)
- 100.3 KDJE Jacksonville (Modern rock)
- 101.1 KDXE Cammack Village (Conservative talk)
- 101.7 KVLO Humnoke (Adult hits/Jack FM)
- 102.1 KOKY Sherwood (Urban adult contemporary)
- 102.5 KPZK-FM Cabot (Gospel)
- 102.9 KARN-FM Sheridan (Talk radio)
- 103.7 KABZ Little Rock (Sports/ESPN)
- 104.3 KJSS-LP North Little Rock (Community/variety)
- 104.7 KFLI Des Arc (Classic hits)
- 105.1 KMJX Conway (Classic country)
- 106.3 KOLL Lonoke (Regional Mexican)
- 106.7 KBZU Benton (Sports/ESPN)
- 107.3 KZLI-LP Little Rock (Spanish Christian)
- 107.7 KLAL Wrightsville (Contemporary hit radio)

=== NOAA Weather Radio ===
Bowling Green is also served by the following NOAA Weather Radio stations:

- KXI91 (Morrilton) at 162.475 MHz
- KXI92 (High Peak) at 162.425 MHz
- KXI96 (Russell) at 162.400 MHz
- WWF96 (Russellville) at 162.525 MHz
- WXJ54 (Star City) at 162.400 MHz
- WXJ55 (Little Rock) at 162.550 MHz
- WXL66 (Mountain View) at 162.450 MHz

== See also ==
- Arkansas media
  - List of newspapers in Arkansas
  - List of radio stations in Arkansas
  - List of television stations in Arkansas
  - Media of cities in Arkansas: Fayetteville, Fort Smith, Hot Springs, Little Rock, Rogers

== Bibliography ==
- S. N. D. North; United States Department of the Interior (1884). "Catalogue of Periodical Publications: Arkansas". History and Present Condition of the Newspaper and Periodical Press of the United States. Washington, D.C.: Government Printing Office. OCLC 1850475.
- James T. Haley, ed. (1895), "Newspapers: Arkansas", Afro-American Encyclopaedia, Nashville: Haley & Florida, hdl:2027/inu.30000029292855, OCLC 219597043
- "Arkansas". American Newspaper Directory. New York: George P. Rowell. 1900. hdl:2027/umn.31951002273861a.
- Josiah H. Shinn (1906), "Early Arkansas Newspapers", Publications of the Arkansas Historical Association, Fayetteville, pp. 395–403
- Frederick W. Allsopp (1922). History of the Arkansas Press for a Hundred Years and More (PDF) (Reprint ed.). Little Rock, Ark: Parke-Harper Pub. Co. ISBN 9780893080730. OCLC 3576168 – via Southern Historical Press.
- "Arkansas". American Newspaper Annual & Directory. Philadelphia: N. W. Ayer & Son. 1922. pp. 55+. hdl:2027/umn.31951001295695n.
- "Newspapers and Radio", Arkansas: a Guide to the State, American Guide Series, New York: Federal Writers' Project, 1941, pp. 93–96, hdl:2027/mdp.39015002678947, OCLC 478887 – via HathiTrust
- Union list of Arkansas newspapers, 1819-1942. Little Rock: Works Progress Administration. 1942 – via HathiTrust.
- John A. Hudson; Robert L. Peterson (1955). "Arkansas Newspapers in the University of Texas Newspaper Collection". Arkansas Historical Quarterly. 14 (3): 207–224. doi:10.2307/40037988. JSTOR 40037988.
- G. Thomas Tanselle (1971). "General Studies: Arkansas". Guide to the Study of United States Imprints. Harvard University Press. p. 832. ISBN 978-0-674-36761-6. (Includes information about newspapers)
- Robert W. Meriwether (1974). A Chronicle of Arkansas Newspapers Published Since 1922 and of the Arkansas Press Association, 1930-1972. Little Rock, Ark: Arkansas Press Association. OCLC 2146483.
- Michael B. Dougan (2003). Community diaries: Arkansas newspapering, 1819-2002. ISBN 0874837227.
- Jack Alicoate, ed. (1939), "Arkansas", Radio Annual, New York: Radio Daily, OCLC 2459636 – via Internet Archive
- Chas. A. Alicoate, ed. (1957), "Amplitude Modulation Stations - AM: Arkansas", Radio Annual and Television Yearbook, New York: Radio Daily Corp., OCLC 10512206 – via Internet Archive
- "AM Stations in the U.S.: Arkansas", Radio Annual Television Year Book, New York: Radio Television Daily, 1963, OCLC 10512375 – via Internet Archive
- "United States TV Stations: Arkansas", Yearbook of Radio and Television, New York: Radio Television Daily, 1964, OCLC 7469377 – via Internet Archive
- Morgan, James Logan (1981). Arkansas newspaper index 1819-1845. Newport, Arkansas: Morgan Books. OCLC 8191114.
