= KARN (AM) =

- Little Rock, Arkansas; United States
- Broadcast area: Little Rock metropolitan area
- Frequency: 920 kHz
- Branding: The Sports Animal 920

Programming
- Format: Sports
- Affiliations: Westwood One Sports; Fox Sports Radio; Arkansas Radio Network

Ownership
- Owner: Cumulus Media; (Radio License Holding CBC, LLC)
- Sister stations: KAAY; KFOG; KIPR; KURB; KARN-FM; KLAL

History
- First air date: July 6, 1928
- Last air date: July 2026
- Former call signs: KGJF (1928–1931); KARK (1931–1972)
- Former frequencies: 890 kHz (1928–1941)
- Call sign meaning: Disambiguation of former KARK calls, meaning Arkansas

Technical information
- Licensing authority: FCC
- Facility ID: 60703
- Class: B
- Power: 5,000 watts
- Transmitter coordinates: 34°46′20″N 92°14′45″W

Links
- Public license information: Public file; LMS
- Webcast: Listen live
- Website: www.sportsanimal920.com

KARN (920 AM) was a commercial radio station licensed to Little Rock, Arkansas, United States. Owned by Cumulus Media, it aired a sports format known as "920 AM The Sports Animal" prior to going silent in 2026. The station's studios were located on Wellington Hills Road in West Little Rock. The transmitter tower was located off North Hills Boulevard in North Little Rock. KARN was licensed by the Federal Communications Commission to broadcast a digital HD signal, although it was not broadcasting in HD.

== History ==
=== Early years ===
KARN was among the oldest stations in Little Rock, getting its original broadcast license on July 6, 1928. Originally it was KGJF, operating on 890 kHz, at 500 watts by day and 250 watts at night. In 1931, the station changed its call sign to KARK, to identify with Arkansas, becoming a founding member and the flagship station of the Arkansas Radio Network.

By the late 1930s, KARK had increased its power to 1,000 watts full-time, and became an affiliate of the NBC Red Network. During the Golden Age of Radio, it carried NBC's dramas, comedies, news, sports, game shows, soap operas and big band remote broadcasts.

=== Move to AM 920 ===
In 1941, the station switched to its current dial position at 920 kHz. It got a power boost to 5,000 watts. In an industry advertisement in Broadcasting magazine, it touted its increased signal, saying "No one, other than KARK, covers 43 counties in Arkansas." It added that Arkansas had more retail sales than Wyoming and Vermont combined.

By the 1950s, as network programming was shifting to television, KARK moved to a middle of the road format, with news and sports broadcasts. On April 15, 1954, KARK-TV (channel 4) went on the air as the second TV station in Little Rock. Since KARK was an NBC Radio affiliate, KARK-TV joined NBC-TV. On June 22, 1961, KARK-FM 103.7 began broadcasting, simulcasting KARK AM.

In 1972, Channel 4 was sold to a Denver-based company. The TV station kept the KARK-TV call sign but that required the radio stations, now owned by Ted Snider, to switch to new call letters. They became KARN and KARN-FM. By this point KARN-FM had stopped simulcasting, instead becoming a Top 40 outlet, later taking the call letters KKYK (now KABZ).

=== Switch to talk radio ===
By the early 1980s, KARN had discontinued music programming. It became an affiliate of CBS Radio News and switched to a news/talk format, picking up nationally syndicated shows such as Rush Limbaugh and Sean Hannity. Generations of Arkansas broadcasters have worked at KARN, including sportscaster Jim Elder, talk show hosts Dave Elswick, Pat Lynch, Rex Nelson, Ray Lincoln, Bob Harrison, Taylor Carr, Grant Merrill and Sharon Lee, farm broadcasters Gary DiGiuseppe, Bob Buice, Lowell Ruffcorn, John Philpot, Stewart Doan, Janet Adkison and Keith Merckx and newscasters Bob Steel, Don Corbett, Vern Beachy, Scott Crowder, Michael Hibblen, Scott Charton, Rita Richardson, Ron Breeding, Don Griffin, Barry Green, David Wallace, Ken Miller, Paula Cooper, Terry Easley, Jayson Rogers, Alan Caudle, Patrick Grant, Ed Johnson, Jeff Herzer and Jack Heinritz. The longtime commercial “voice” of the radio station was Jim Cutler. KARN's program directors have included Rick McGee, Dennis Turner, Chuck Martin, Dennis Kelly, Dale Forbis, Bob Shomper, Greg Foster, Neal Gladner, Bud Ford and Dave Elswick.

=== FM simulcasts ===
In 1997, Citadel Broadcasting bought KARN and several other Little Rock stations. Citadel wanted to aggressively market KARN's talk format. For a number of years, KARN simulcast on two suburban FM signals, 3,000 watt 102.5 FM licensed to Cabot (now KPZK-FM), and 6,000 watt 101.7 FM licensed to Humnoke (now KVLO). While both stations added to KARN's ratings, neither signal covers the Little Rock radio market well. In the summer of 2004, the decision was made to simulcast KARN full-time on the co-owned 50,000 watt 102.9 FM frequency, licensed to Sheridan, which became KARN-FM. Now KARN listeners could continue to hear the station on AM 920 or switch to the better sound quality of FM on 102.9.

In 2007, when Citadel acquired nearly two dozen ABC Radio stations, the company relinquished 11 of its radio stations, including KARN-FM, to The Last Bastion Station Trust, LLC. At first, the trust decided it would not simulcast KARN, which had remained with Citadel, on KARN-FM. Later, Citadel transferred KOKY to the trust, while re-acquiring KARN-FM.

=== The Sports Animal ===
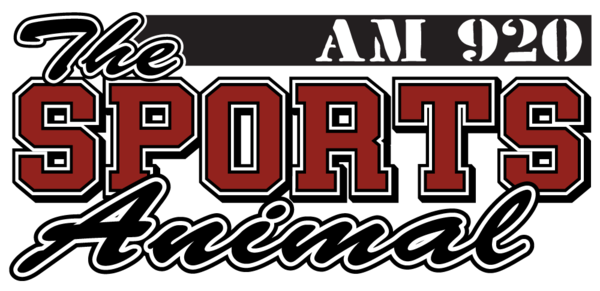
Former logo

In 2009, Citadel Broadcasting decided to end the simulcast. KARN became "920 AM The Sports Animal" airing local shows and national programming from Fox Sports Radio. KARN-FM continues as a talk station.

Citadel merged with Cumulus Media on September 16, 2011. In 2013, when Cumulus partnered with CBS Radio to launch CBS Sports Radio, KARN began carrying its programming. KARN was an affiliate of the Dallas Cowboys Radio Network.

Cumulus took KARN off the air in July 2026, while considering a format change or sale of the station. By the time of the closure, the station's programming was nearly entirely supplied by Westwood One Sports (the successor to CBS Sports Radio), except for the Fox Sports Radio-distributed Dan Patrick Show. The Federal Communications Commission cancelled the station's license on September 23, 2026.
