= KOKY =

Radio station in Sheridan–Little Rock, Arkansas

Coordinates: 34.766°N 92.339°W

- Sherwood, Arkansas; United States
- Broadcast area: Little Rock, Arkansas
- Frequency: 102.1 MHz
- Branding: KOKY 102.1 FM

Programming
- Format: Urban adult contemporary

Ownership
- Owner: The Last Bastion Station Trust, LLC
- Operator: Cumulus Media (de facto)
- Sister stations: Last Bastion: KPZK-FM; Cumulus: KARN, KAAY, KFOG, KURB, KARN-FM, KLAL

Technical information
- Licensing authority: FCC
- Facility ID: 15161
- Class: A
- ERP: 4,100 watts
- HAAT: 118 meters

Links
- Public license information: Public file; LMS
- Webcast: Listen Live
- Website: 1021koky.com

KOKY (102.1 FM) is a commercial radio station broadcasting from Little Rock, Arkansas (licensed to suburban Sherwood). It airs an urban adult contemporary format, and is owned and operated by The Last Bastion Station Trust, LLC, though most of its operations are sub-contracted to its former owner, Cumulus Media. The station's studios are located with other Cumulus stations in West Little Rock, and the transmitter tower is located west of the downtown area.

== History ==
The original KOKY, at 1440 AM, existed as a longtime heritage urban station in Little Rock from its launch in 1956. It was the first station aimed at the African American community in Arkansas. Then located near Central High, one of its alumni, Al Bell, was influenced by the station during the heyday of the Civil Rights Movement. He later became head of Stax Records. That KOKY changed its call letters to KITA and switched to gospel music in 1979; it is now KTUV, "The Cat" part of the Arkansas Rocks group Urban Oldies Station . The call letters were also reused in the 1980s on the 1250 AM frequency, now KFOG (AM).

KOUN signed on at 102.1 FM in 1994, playing classic rock. The call letters were changed to LPQ in 1994.

The present KOKY was launched by Citadel Broadcasting on January 1, 1998, per its FCC filings. From the beginning, it has claimed the original KOKY as its inspiration and heritage; its website's history refers only to the original KOKY, and does not mention that its only connections to the 1440 AM station are the call letters and general format. Its logo was derived from the 1250 AM KOKY, which was owned by a Little Rock predecessor of Citadel; KPZK (AM) is still owned by Citadel.

In 2007, upon merger of nearly a couple dozen ABC Radio stations, Citadel relinquished 11 of its radio stations, including former sister stations KARN-FM & KVLO and current sister station KPZK-FM (which KVLO simulcast till it was sold in 2012), to The Last Bastion Station Trust, LLC. However, the trust decided it would not simulcast KARN, which had remained with Citadel, on KARN-FM; Citadel then transferred KOKY to the trust in exchange for KARN-FM.

The choice of KOKY was probably made to increase the likelihood that both KOKY and KPZK-FM, which also targets an African American audience, would be sold together to an African American owner; the FCC order that required the divestitures to Last Bastion strongly suggested that the trust seek out minority owners, a process that has not been completed as of 2025 (eighteen years since the ABC Radio sale closed), since many of the station's operations continue under the management of Cumulus Media, including its website, on-air operations, engineering, and advertising sales. KOKY and KPZK are the last two stations still owned by Last Bastion, which last sold a station in 2014.

The station is run complementary to its former rival, KIPR. KOKY was the market's home to the nationally syndicated The Tom Joyner Morning Show. As of January 1, 2020 it also broadcasts The Rickey Smiley Morning Show.
