= KPZK-FM =

Coordinates: 34.923°N 92.009°W

- Cabot, Arkansas; United States
- Broadcast area: Little Rock metropolitan area
- Frequency: 102.5 MHz
- Branding: Praise 102.5 FM

Programming
- Format: Gospel

Ownership
- Owner: The Last Bastion Station Trust, LLC
- Operator: Cumulus Media (de facto)
- Sister stations: Last Bastion: KOKY; Cumulus: KARN; KAAY; KFOG; KURB; KARN-FM; KLAL

History
- Former call signs: KVQB (1989–1991); KLPQ (1991–1994); KBBL (1994–1996); KKRN (1996–1997); KARN-FM (1997–2004); KVLO (2004–2005)
- Call sign meaning: Praise, or Pulaski County, which has Little Rock as its county seat

Technical information
- Licensing authority: FCC
- Facility ID: 25860
- Class: A
- ERP: 4,100 watts
- HAAT: 100 meters

Links
- Public license information: Public file; LMS
- Webcast: Listen live
- Website: www.praise1025fm.com

KPZK-FM (102.5 MHz, better known locally as Praise 102.5 FM) plays a gospel format in the Little Rock metropolitan area. It is under ownership of The Last Bastion Station Trust, LLC, though most of its operations are sub-contracted to Cumulus Media, successor-in-interest to its former owner, Citadel Broadcasting. The station's studios are located with other Cumulus stations in West Little Rock, and the transmitter tower is located in Cabot.

Former sister station KPZK (at 1250 AM), which initially shared its call sign, remained with Citadel Broadcasting when KPZK-FM and another former sister station, KVLO, were transferred to the trust. KPZK (AM) has simulcast another Cumulus station, KIPR, ever since; it changed its call sign to KFOG in 2019 to warehouse the historic call sign of KNBR-FM in San Francisco.

The choice of KOKY and KPZK for spin-off into the trust was probably made to increase the likelihood that both KOKY and KPZK-FM, which also targets an African American audience, would be sold together to an African American owner; the Federal Communications Commission order that required the divestitures to Last Bastion strongly suggested that the trust seek out minority owners, a process that has not been completed as of 2026 (19 years since Citadel's acquisition of ABC Radio closed), since many of the station's operations continue under the management of Cumulus Media, including its website, on-air operations, engineering, and advertising sales. KOKY and KPZK are the last two stations still owned by Last Bastion, which last sold a station in 2014.

On July 3, 2012, KVLO split from its simulcast with KPZK-FM and changed to an adult hits format.
