= KPZK =

KPZK may refer to:

- KPZK-FM, a radio station (102.5 FM) licensed to Cabot, Arkansas, United States
- KFOG (AM), a radio station (1250 AM) licensed to Little Rock, Arkansas, United States, which held the call sign KPZK from 2004 to 2019
