= Voice of Truth =

Voice of Truth may refer to:

- Voice of Truth (broadcast), a broadcast of Radio Missions
- "Voice of Truth" (song), a song by Casting Crowns
