= Allport, Arkansas =

- Town
- Location of Allport in Lonoke County, Arkansas.

- Location in the United States
- Coordinates: 34°32′22″N 91°47′6″W
- Country: United States
- State: Arkansas
- County: Lonoke

Area
  - Total: 0.21 sq mi (0.54 km^{2})
  - Land: 0.21 sq mi (0.54 km^{2})
  - Water: 0 sq mi (0.00 km^{2})
- Elevation: 203 ft (62 m)

Population (2020)
  - Total: 86
  - Estimate (2025): 89 ▲
  - Density: 413.8/sq mi (159.76/km^{2})
- Time zone: UTC-6 (Central (CST))
  - Summer (DST): UTC-5 (CDT)
- ZIP code: 72046
- Area code: 501
- FIPS code: 05-00940
- GNIS feature ID: 0045838

Allport is a town in Lonoke County, Arkansas, United States. Although a black enclave in the largely-white Lonoke County since the 1870s, the town did not incorporate until 1967 in order to receive funding for municipal services. Located within Central Arkansas along Highway 165, the community's economy is strongly tied to agriculture. As of the 2020 census, Allport had a population of 86.

== History ==
Allport was incorporated in 1967 and its first Mayor was an African-American man and World War II veteran named Johnny E. Gay. Leading the movement to incorporate, he made several needed improvements to the town upon his election. The Allport community set aside a special day of celebration named Johnny E. Gay Day. Also Flat Land Day

== Geography ==
According to the United States Census Bureau, the town has a total area of 0.5 km^{2} (0.19 sq mi), all land.

== Demographics ==
Historical population
Census	Pop.	Note	%±
1970	307		—
1980	295		−3.9%
1990	188		−36.3%
2000	127		−32.4%
2010	115		−9.4%
2020	86		−25.2%
2025 (est.)	89	▲	3.5%
U.S. Decennial Census

=== 2020 census ===
Allport town, Arkansas – Racial and ethnic composition Note: the US Census treats Hispanic/Latino as an ethnic category. This table excludes Latinos from the racial categories and assigns them to a separate category. Hispanics/Latinos may be of any race.
Race / Ethnicity (NH = Non-Hispanic)	Pop 2000	Pop 2010	Pop 2020	% 2000	% 2010	% 2020
White alone (NH)	7	13	7	5.51%	11.30%	8.14%
Black or African American alone (NH)	120	93	74	94.49%	80.87%	86.05%
Native American or Alaska Native alone (NH)	0	0	0	0.00%	0.00%	0.00%
Asian alone (NH)	0	0	0	0.00%	0.00%	0.00%
Pacific Islander alone (NH)	0	0	0	0.00%	0.00%	0.00%
Other Race alone (NH)	0	0	1	0.00%	0.00%	1.16%
Mixed race or Multiracial (NH)	0	9	1	0.00%	7.83%	1.16%
Hispanic or Latino (any race)	0	0	3	0.00%	0.00%	3.49%
Total	127	115	86	100.00%	100.00%	100.00%

As of the census of 2000, there were 127 people, 44 households, and 30 families residing in the town. The population density was 272.4 people /km^{2} (706 people/mi^{2}). There were 59 housing units at an average density of 126.6 units /km^{2} (328 units/mi^{2}). The racial makeup of the town was 5.51% White and 94.49% Black or African American.

There were 44 households, out of which 18.2% had children under the age of 18 living with them, 25.0% were married couples living together, 29.5% had a female householder with no husband present, and 31.8% were non-families. 31.8% of all households were made up of individuals, and 15.9% had someone living alone who was 65 years of age or older. The average household size was 2.89 and the average family size was 3.77.

In the town, the population was spread out, with 26.8% under the age of 18, 9.4% from 18 to 24, 26.0% from 25 to 44, 23.6% from 45 to 64, and 14.2% who were 65 years of age or older. The median age was 34 years. For every 100 females, there were 92.4 males. For every 100 females age 18 and over, there were 89.8 males.

The median income for a household in the town was $17,500, and the median income for a family was $18,333. Males had a median income of $23,125 versus $0 for females. The per capita income for the town was $18,685. There were 35.7% of families and 32.5% of the population living below the poverty line, including 52.4% of under eighteens and 48.4% of those over 64.

== Education ==
Allport is in the Carlisle School District. Also the England school district It was served by the Humnoke School District,"Arkansas Department of Education school district maps, 1952-1954 Lonoke County, 1952-1954". Arkansas Digital Archives. Arkansas State Archives. (Download) until it merged into the Carlisle district on July 1, 1998.
