= The Mighty 1090 =

The Mighty 1090 is an on-air slogan for two AM radio stations broadcasting on the 1090 kHz frequency in North America:

- KAAY, Little Rock, Arkansas, from the 1960s to mid-1980s
- XEPRS-AM, a border blaster licensed to Rosarito, Baja California, Mexico but serving San Diego, California
