= Carlisle School District =

Carlisle School District may refer to:

- Carlisle Area School District - Pennsylvania
- Carlisle Community Schools (also known as the Carlisle School District) - Iowa
- Carlisle Independent School District - Texas
- Carlisle School District - Arkansas
