= KHTE =

KHTE may refer to:

- KHTE-FM, a radio station (96.5 FM) licensed to England, Arkansas, United States
- KHTE-LP, a defunct low-power television station (channel 44) formerly licensed to Little Rock, Arkansas, United States
