= KARN-FM =

Radio station in Sheridan–Little Rock, Arkansas

- Sheridan, Arkansas; United States
- Broadcast area: Little Rock metropolitan area
- Frequency: 102.9 MHz
- Branding: Newsradio 102.9 KARN

Programming
- Format: Talk radio
- Affiliations: Fox News Radio; Premiere Networks; Westwood One

Ownership
- Owner: Cumulus Media; (Radio License Holding CBC, LLC)
- Sister stations: KAAY; KIPR; KLAL; KURB

History
- First air date: April 13, 1987
- Former call signs: KQLV (1987–1990); KXIX (1990–1992); KEZQ (1992–1995); KEZQ-FM (1995–1996); KVLO (1996–2004)
- Call sign meaning: Arkansas, from sister station KARN

Technical information
- Licensing authority: FCC
- Facility ID: 24151
- Class: C2
- ERP: 50,000 watts
- HAAT: 150 meters (490 ft)
- Transmitter coordinates: 34°46′21.1″N 92°14′44.6″W

Links
- Public license information: Public file; LMS
- Webcast: Listen live
- Website: www.newsradio1029.com

KARN-FM (102.9 MHz) is a commercial radio station licensed to Sheridan, Arkansas, United States, and serving the Little Rock metropolitan area. Owned by Cumulus Media, it broadcasts a talk format and has long been the flagship of the Arkansas Radio Network. The station's studios are on Wellington Hills Road in West Little Rock, and the transmitter tower is on North Sardis Road in Mabelvale.

== History ==
The signal at 102.9 signed on the air on April 13. 1987. It began as a Class A FM station in Sheridan, Arkansas, that did not fully cover metro Little Rock. It found some success as a satellite-delivered oldies station known as "Q-102" KQLV. Q-102's popularity was short-lived as struggling rock station KZLR "KZ-95" picked up the oldies format as KOLL "Cool 95". Cool 95's signal better covered the Little Rock market while Q-102 was limited to the southern suburbs of the city.

KQLV upgraded its signal to the current 102.9 facility and switched to country music as KXIX "Kix 103". Despite a huge promotions blitz and a massive prize giveaway, Kix 103 never cracked a 2 share in the ratings and never put any fear into country powerhouse KSSN.

Kix 103 entered a sales agreement with KEZQ (100.3 FM), and the two eventually swapped formats with KEZQ's soft AC format ending up on 102.9 and KXIX's country format going to 100.3 as KDDK "K-Duck 100".

KEZQ remained at 102.9 for a few years, and KURB acquired it in 1995. Shortly afterward, the KEZQ call sign moved to 1250 AM, and 102.9 became KVLO "K-Love 102.9" (unrelated to the K-Love network). The K-Love soft AC format was the most successful music format the 102.9 frequency had, but Citadel Broadcasting took it country in the early 2000s as B-98.5 began transitioning from Hot AC to AC. The country format was not much more successful than the old Kix 103 had been.

For a number of years, KARN (920 AM) simulcast on two low power FM signals, including KVLO (102.5 FM) in Cabot, and KPZK-FM 101.7 in Humnoke, Arkansas. While both stations attracted substantial listener numbers, neither signal covered the Little Rock market well. In the summer of 2004, the decision was made to simulcast KARN full-time on the 102.9 FM frequency.

In 2007, upon merger of nearly a couple dozen ABC Radio stations, Citadel Broadcasting relinquished 11 of its radio stations, including KARN-FM, to The Last Bastion Station Trust, LLC. However, the trust decided it would not simulcast KARN, which had remained with Citadel, on KARN-FM; Citadel then transferred KOKY to the trust instead, and re-acquired KARN-FM. Citadel merged with Cumulus Media on September 16, 2011.

=== Past personalities ===
Generations of Arkansas broadcasters have worked at KARN, including sportscaster Jim Elder; talk show hosts Pat Lynch, Ray Lincoln, Dave Elswick, "Big Dave" Medford, Ray Lincoln, Doc Washburn, Bob Harrison, Taylor Carr, Rex Nelson, Grant Merrill, and Sharon Lee; farm broadcasters Bob Buice, Lowell Ruffcorn, John Philpot, Stewart Doan, Janet Adkison and Keith Merckx (who also spent time as a news reporter and anchor); and newscasters Don Corbett, Vern Beachy, Scott Crowder, Michael Hibblen, Scott Charton, Rita Richardson, Ron Breeding, Don Griffin, Barry Green, David Wallace, Ken Miller, Paula Cooper, Terry Easley, Jayson Rogers, Alan Caudle, Patrick Grant, "Ugly" Ed Johnson and Jack Heinritz.

== Programming ==
Local personalities on KARN-FM include Toby Howell, Rebecca Davis and Steve Finnegan. The rest of the weekday schedule is nationally syndicated conservative talk programs.
