= Black Boys Burning =

2017 book by Grif Stockley

- First edition
- Author: Grig Stockley
- Language: English
- Genre: Non-fiction
- Publisher: University Press of Mississippi
- Publication date: 2017
- Publication place: United States

Black Boys Burning: The 1959 Fire at the Arkansas Negro Boys Industrial School is a 2017 non-fiction book by Grif Stockley, published by University Press of Mississippi. It is about the deadly fire at the Arkansas Negro Boys' Industrial School.

== Contents ==
There are ten chapters in the book. The history of the institution along with the fire event and emergency services are in the first three chapters. The schooling in the institution is detailed in chapter four. The activism against anti-black practices in the state is detailed in chapter 5.

The book discusses the significant persons involved in the affair. According to the author, the fire became deadly due to neglect as a result of white supremacist sentiment, citing how Governor of Arkansas Orval Faubus deliberately underfunded the facility.

The book includes references that are indicated by endnotes.

== Reception ==
Dionne Danns of Indiana University praised the "accessibly written book" and its "methodological lessons", the latter which she argued was the "greatest contribution".
