= Mitch Petrus =

American football player (1987–2019)

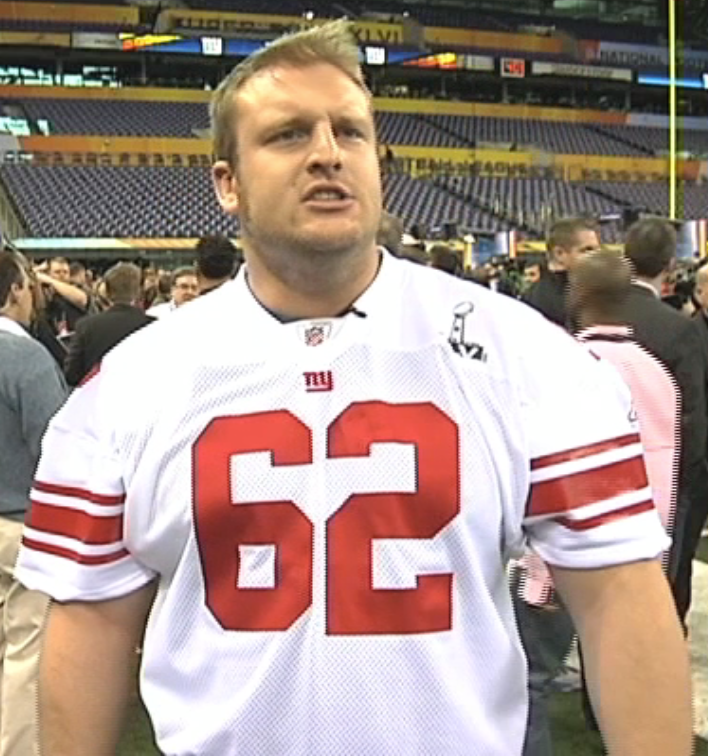
- Petrus at Super Bowl XLVI media day

No. 62, 67
- Position: Guard

Personal information
- Born: May 11, 1987; Carlisle, Arkansas, U.S.
- Died: July 18, 2019 (aged 32); Lonoke, Arkansas, U.S.
- Listed height: 6 ft 3 in (1.91 m)
- Listed weight: 315 lb (143 kg)

Career information
- High school: Carlisle (AR)
- College: Arkansas
- NFL draft: 2010: 5th round, 147th overall pick

Career history
- New York Giants (2010−2012); New England Patriots (2012); Tennessee Titans (2012)

Awards and highlights
- Super Bowl champion (XLVI); First-team All-SEC (2009); Second-team All-SEC (2007)

Career NFL statistics
- Games played: 27
- Games started: 4
- Stats at Pro Football Reference

Johnathan Mitchell Petrus (May 11, 1987 – July 18, 2019) was an American professional football guard who played in the National Football League (NFL).

== Early life ==
Mitch Petrus was born on May 11, 1987, in Carlisle, Arkansas. He attended Carlisle High School, where he played high school football. He was a class of 2005 Graduate.

== College career ==
An unrated tight end prospect, Petrus walked on as a fullback at the University of Arkansas but was moved to offensive guard for the 2007 season. He blocked for rushing tandem Darren McFadden and Felix Jones, both of whom eclipsed the 1,000-yard mark, and was named to the All-SEC second-team. He redshirted during the 2008 season. Following the 2009 season, he was named All-SEC first-team by SEC coaches and second-team by the Associated Press.

He graduated with a degree in agricultural economics.

== Professional career ==
Pre-draft measurables
Height	Weight	Arm length	Hand span	40-yard dash	10-yard split	20-yard split	20-yard shuttle	Three-cone drill	Vertical jump	Broad jump	Bench press
6 ft 3 in (1.91 m)	310 lb (141 kg)	33 3/4 in (0.86 m)	9 1/2 in (0.24 m)	5.25 s	1.81 s	3.01 s	4.58 s	7.28 s	30.0 in (0.76 m)	8 ft 10 in (2.69 m)	45 reps
All values from NFL Combine/Pro Day

=== New York Giants ===
At the 2010 NFL Scouting Combine, Petrus completed 45 reps of 225 pounds (102 kg) on the bench press, which tied defensive linemen Leif Larsen and Mike Kudla for the second most since 2000.

He was drafted by the New York Giants in the fifth round of the 2010 NFL draft. He was the seventh guard to be selected that year. He played in 17 regular-season games with three starts. In the 2011 season, the Giants finished with a 9–7 record and made the playoffs. He appeared in all four 2011 postseason games, including the Super Bowl XLVI victory over the New England Patriots.

Petrus was waived on September 2, 2012, after the Giants were awarded offensive tackle D. J. Jones on waivers from the Philadelphia Eagles. Jones failed his physical with the Giants and Petrus was re-signed the next day.

On November 3, Petrus was released by the Giants after tight end Travis Beckum was activated.

=== New England Patriots ===
The New England Patriots signed Petrus on November 13, 2012, to help with a depleted offensive line that included injuries to Logan Mankins and Dan Connolly. He was released by the Patriots on December 3, 2012.

=== Tennessee Titans ===
On December 6, 2012, Petrus was claimed off waivers by the Titans. He played in two games with the Titans in the 2012 season. He was waived by the Titans on March 12, 2013.

After his stint with the Titans, Petrus did not sign with another NFL team and retired.

== Personal life ==
Petrus played bass guitar in a band called Vikings of the North Atlantic.

He resided and worked in Carlisle, Arkansas, where he died of heat stroke on July 18, 2019.
