= Beaker Street =

Underground music program

Beaker Street with Clyde Clifford
- Country of origin: United States
- Language: English
- Home station: KAAY

Beaker Street with Clyde Clifford was the first underground music program broadcast regularly on a commercial AM radio station in the central US. The station's signal carried far and wide. In early 1967 Beaker Street was a staple for adherents to the burgeoning underground communities in the upper Mid-West especially in Des Moines, Iowa, where it was the only access to Dr. Demento and Firesign Theatre. Beaker Street began on Little Rock, Arkansas 50,000 watt AM radio station KAAY late in 1966 and ran through 1972. The show's original announcer, Clyde Clifford, moved to FM in 1974 as the rise in popularity of FM radio began to impact the operations of many AM stations. Beaker Street pre-dated the FM radio boom of the mid-1970s and foretold the rise of album-oriented Rock and Classic rock formats.

== History ==
Dale Seidenschwarz, a.k.a. Clyde Clifford, was the prototype of the laid-back late-night radio DJ, known for the very long pauses in his speech. The stage name of Clyde Clifford continued a tradition at KAAY whereby the on-air personalities often fashioned a stage name from the names of the board of directors of LIN Broadcasting, the owners of KAAY. Clyde W. Clifford was the comptroller general of LIN Broadcasting.

Among the more memorable details of this radio program were the interludes of eerie sound effects and a background of space music between songs. These background sounds were necessary to mask the noise of the transmitter since the program originated at KAAY's transmitter location in Wrightsville, AR rather than in the station's broadcast studios in downtown Little Rock. Broadcasting from the transmitter site allowed a single employee, Clifford, to serve in the dual capacity of overnight broadcast engineer and as announcer. The original background music, composed by Henry Mancini, came from the dream sequence in the movie Charade. In the early 1970s, the background music was changed to sounds from "Cannabis Sativa" by a band called Head. This background is still in use today as a trademark of Beaker Street, although the need to mask transmitter sounds ended when the show left KAAY. The name of the show reflected the era in which it was created. Beaker Street was an oblique reference to LSD. The program featured Acid rock and its name alluded to the fact that "Acid" ( i.e., LSD ) was created in a laboratory beaker. The station tried to be as mysterious as possible, at one time even running a contest for listeners to try to guess how to spell Beaker, suggesting that it was spelled in some unconventional fashion.

Although Clyde Clifford (Dale Seidenschwarz) originated the concept of Beaker Street, the show continued for some years after Clifford left KAAY in 1974. Several Beaker Street hosts used the on-air name of Ken Knight, followed by Stuart McRae in the mid-1970s. Stuart McRae expanded the show from the original three hours to a full five and a half hours (11:00 PM to 4:30 AM). In early 1977, a new program director at KAAY decided to end Beaker Street, viewing it as inconsistent with other programming. McRae resigned over this decision, and the last regular Beaker Street shows were handled by Don Payne.

Despite the show's demise on KAAY, Beaker Street remained a fond memory for many fans. When KAAY was sold and converted from a rock music to a religious format in 1985, Clyde Clifford was invited back to handle the final hours of rock music programming on March 3, 1985. At the conclusion of this melancholy and somewhat emotional program, believed by many listeners to be the last Beaker Street, the final song played by Clifford was 'The Circle Game' by Joni Mitchell.

Years later, Clyde Clifford and Beaker Street returned to the airwaves every Sunday night from 7 p.m. until midnight Central Time, first on KZLR (KZ-95) and later on Magic 105.1 FM KMJX. During that time the show was also streamed live via the internet, from the Beaker street homepage. As a result of a change in station programming format, the final Beaker Street on Magic 105 was broadcast February 17, 2008. Beaker Street begin broadcasting from its new home at The Point 94.1 FM on Sunday March 9, 2008, continuing to occupy the 7:00pm-midnight time slot on Sunday evenings. Ironically, the studio of The Point 94.1 FM is located in the same building (2400 Cottondale Lane in Little Rock, Arkansas) where Clyde Clifford broadcast the last hours of rock music programming on KAAY twenty-three years earlier. The last song of the new Beaker Street was, appropriately, the last song from KAAY, "The Circle Game" by Joni Mitchell. Jaime Brockett's "The Legend of the U.S.S. Titanic" was also played in the third hour of the final show on the Point on February 6, 2011. Clyde Clifford currently DJ's Beaker Street on Friday nights from 8 p.m. until 12 a.m. US Central time on the Arkansas Rocks network of radio stations and internet streams.

== Significance of Beaker Street ==
The strong nighttime signal of 50,000 watt, clear channel KAAY meant that it was possible to regularly listen to the station's nighttime programming in a wide area of the midwest and south. KAAY's late-night "footprint" gained fans as far west as Wyoming and Montana, north to the Dakotas and Manitoba and south as far as New Orleans and into Florida. This strong broadcast signal enabled Beaker Street to deliver the music of the late 1960s counterculture to many smaller cities and towns in America, where such music could not otherwise be heard over the air waves. Beaker Street attracted a legion of fans across the Midwest with its pioneering format, which featured long album cuts from rock artists who otherwise would not get commercial radio airplay outside of large cities with freeform or progressive rock stations.

One example of the impact of Beaker Street can be seen in the evolution and success of the band Headstone, formed in 1969 by five students at the University of Northern Iowa. The band released a 45-rpm record "You Ain't Goin' Nowhere" which attracted the attention of Clyde Clifford and was placed in regular rotation on Beaker Street. Headstone co-founder Tom Tatman characterized Beaker Street as "the ultimate Midwestern underground radio program of the day." The popularity generated by the Beaker Street exposure allowed the band to move to bigger and better performances, and in August 2006, the band was inducted into the Iowa Rock and Roll Hall of Fame.

For fans of Beaker Street, many album cuts became favorites over the years, including songs which were generally not available on either 45-rpm records or LP albums. One such performance was a melancholy rendition of a Tom Paxton song, Cindy's Cryin, performed by the Little Rock band Deepwater Reunion with vocalist Barbara Raney. Original records or tapes of this performance are rare, but a similar version of Cindy's Cryin has been performed by talented fans of the music, fans who first heard the song on Beaker Street. Another rarely heard recording played on Beaker Street was the Jaime Brockett cover of an old Leadbelly song, which he called "The Legend of the U.S.S. Titanic"; a rambling 13-minute Titanic opus, recorded in 1969, which has the ship's captain smoking a hemp cigarette with the first mate minutes before the ship hits the iceberg.

Radio theater also made a comeback on Beaker Street, in half-hour or hour-long segments called Beaker Theatre; sometimes utilizing serious (and occasionally not-so serious) re-workings of old radio serial scripts, voiced by the Beaker Players; sometime playing the recordings of the comedy group Firesign Theatre, especially the "Nick Danger - Third Eye" series of skits. During the run of Beaker Street, the Firesign Theatre actually made several live appearances on the show.

== Beaker Street in Cuba ==
The KAAY nighttime signal was so strong that young people in Havana City and in other places in Cuba were able to receive it clearly. In the late 1970s, music sung in English was restricted by the Communist Government. Cuban radio stations were allowed to devote only about 20% of their time broadcasting music sung in English, so many young people used to listen to American radio stations as a response to that limitation, and the KAAY was one of the most popular. Today young people from those years still remember the DJ announcing "Beaker Street... an underground music service from KAAY, Little Rock, Arkansas..."
