= KTUV =

Radio station in Little Rock, Arkansas

- Little Rock, Arkansas; United States
- Frequency: 1440 kHz
- Branding: The Cat

Programming
- Format: Urban Oldies

Ownership
- Owner: Larry Crain, Sr.; (Crain Media Group, LLC)
- Operator: Jay and Devon Brentlinger (Broadcast Industry Group, LLC)

History
- First air date: 1956
- Former call signs: KOKY (1956–1978); KITA (January 1, 1979–2006)

Technical information
- Licensing authority: FCC
- Facility ID: 34988
- Class: B
- Power: 5,000 watts day 240 watts night
- Transmitter coordinates: 34°42′46″N 92°16′48″W
- Translator: 99.9 K260DT (Little Rock)

Links
- Public license information: Public file; LMS
- Website: kcatradio.com

KTUV (1440 AM) is a radio station broadcasting an Urban Oldies format. Licensed to Little Rock, Arkansas, United States, it serves the Little Rock area. The transmitter is located on S. Arch St. in Little Rock near Interstate 30. The station is currently owned by Larry Crain Sr., through licensee Crain Media Group, LLC.

== History ==
1440 was built and signed on in October 1956 by John McLendon's Ebony Radio of Arkansas as KOKY, the first station targeted at Little Rock's African American community, with studios just blocks from Central High School. It was a 5,000-watt daytime station. Ebony already operated WOKJ in Jackson, Mississippi and also came to own stations in Shreveport, Louisiana and Birmingham, Alabama. Among the station's personalities was Al Bell, who would later go on to be an executive of Stax Records.

In 1964, McLendon sold KOKY to KOKY, Inc., and the Midwest Broadcasting Company acquired the station in 1968. Two more sales followed in 1972 and 1973, leaving the station in the hands of Brien-KOKY, Inc. When Forus Communications of Arkansas acquired 1440, effective January 1, 1979, the call sign changed to KITA and the station flipped to gospel music. KOKY, in turn, moved to one of the oldest radio frequencies in Arkansas, 1250 AM (now KFOG).

A new limited partnership bought KITA in 1984 and added nighttime service with 240 watts. The station was sold in 1994 to KITA, Inc., and again in 2006 to Davidson Media Group, which gave the station a new KTUV call sign and instituted a new Spanish-language format. Birach Broadcasting Corporation acquired KTUV in 2007.

On June 3, 2019, KTUV relaunched as "La Voz", simulcasting on a new translator, 99.9 K260DT. The new station is commonly operated with 760 KMTL by Radio La Patrona, LLC, which is in the process of buying KMTL.

Effective August 31, 2022, Birach Broadcasting sold both KTUV and the translator to Larry Crain, Sr.'s Crain Media Group, LLC for $300,000.

KTUV is now airing an Urban Oldies format simulcasting with KCAT AM 1340 in Pine Bluff as a part of the KCAT Radio Network.
