= KVNB =

Radio station in Bryant, Arkansas

Coordinates: 34.792°N 92.477°W

- Bryant, Arkansas; United States
- Broadcast area: Little Rock metropolitan area
- Frequency: 93.3 MHz
- Branding: KVNE

Programming
- Format: Christian adult contemporary

Ownership
- Owner: Encouragement Media Group; (Educational Radio Foundation of East Texas, Inc.)

History
- First air date: April 1989
- Former call signs: KBOK-FM (1988–1998); KMVK (1998–1999); KCDI (1999–2003); KKZR (2003–2006); KKSP (2006–2024)

Technical information
- Licensing authority: FCC
- Facility ID: 39751
- Class: C3
- ERP: 22,500 watts
- HAAT: 107 meters (351 ft)

Links
- Public license information: Public file; LMS
- Webcast: Listen live
- Website: KVNE.com

KVNB (93.3 FM) is a non-commercial radio station licensed to Bryant, Arkansas, United States, and serving the Little Rock metropolitan area. It airs a Christian adult contemporary format and is owned by the Encouragement Media Group. It is simulcast on KVNE in Tyler, Texas. KVNB's transmitter is sited on South Elm Street at West 8th Street near the Wilbur Mills Freeway (Interstate 630) in Little Rock.

== History ==
The station signed on the air in April 1989. The original call sign was KKSP. In 2008, KKSP was acquired by the Crain Media Group.

On December 27, 2011, KKSP changed its format from album rock to talk, branded as "Fresh Talk 93.3".

On January 10, 2013, KKSP switched to sports radio, branded as "93.3 The Source". On November 14, 2014, KKSP rebranded as "93.3 The Jock".

On April 2, 2015, Salem Communications assumed the commercial operations of 93.3 KKSP and 96.5 KHTE-FM. KKSP changed KKSP's format to Contemporary Christian, branded as "93.3 The Fish". On April 3, Capitol City filed an application to sell KKSP to Salem's South Texas Broadcasting, Inc. Most CCM stations owned by Salem use The Fish, a symbol of the early Christian Church, as their moniker. Salem's purchase of the station closed on October 1, 2015, at a price of $1.5 million.

In early August 2024, the Encouragement Media Group filed with the FCC to buy KKSP from the Salem Media Group. The price would be $1.55 million. Once the purchase was completed, the station changed its call sign to KVNB.
