= Clyde Clifford =

American radio host

Dale Seidenschwarz, a.k.a. Clyde Clifford, is the host of Beaker Street, a weekly freeform rock radio program.

Beaker Street, which first aired on clear channel KAAY AM 1090 in Little Rock, Arkansas, from 1966 through 1972, was the first underground music program broadcast regularly on a commercial AM radio station. The show attracted fans from across the Western Hemisphere with its pioneering format, which featured long album cuts from artists who otherwise would not get airplay. Clyde was one of the pioneers of the album-oriented rock format which became popular on FM radio in the 1970s.

The stage name Clyde Clifford came from an inside joke at KAAY. The on-air personalities took their stage names from the board of directors of LIN broadcasting, the owners of KAAY. Clyde W. Clifford was the comptroller general of LIN.

Beaker Street with Clyde Clifford currently airs on the Arkansas Rocks network of radio stations and internet streams on Friday nights from 8pm to 12am US central time.

== Awards and recognition ==
Dale Seidenschwarz (a.k.a. Clyde Clifford) was inducted into the Missouri Music Hall of Fame in 2014.
