= Wrightsville Unit =

Prison in Arkansas, United States

Coordinates: 34°36′06″N 92°11′33″W

- Interactive map of Wrightsville Unit
- Location: Wrightsville, Arkansas
- Status: open
- Capacity: 850
- Opened: 1981
- Managed by: Arkansas Department of Correction

Location of Wrightsville in Pulaski County, and Pulaski County in Arkansas

The Wrightsville Unit is an Arkansas Department of Correction prison in Wrightsville, Arkansas.

Over 5,000 acres (2,000 ha) of land at Wrightsville is dedicated to the raising of cattle and the production of hay. Much of the facility is in the Wrightsville city limits though parts are in unincorporated areas.

The land occupied by the unit formerly housed the Negro Boys Industrial School in Wrightsville. For sixty years, there was no marker or memorial that indicated that the boys school existed or that the fire occurred. On April 25, 2019, a monument to the dead was unveiled at the Wrightsville Unit of the Arkansas Department of Correction.
