= Carlisle, Arkansas =

- City
- Motto: "Land here"
- Location in Lonoke County, Arkansas

- Location in the United States
- Coordinates: 34°47′30″N 91°44′45″W
- Country: United States
- State: Arkansas
- County: Lonoke
- Named for: Carlisle, England

Area
  - Total: 4.86 sq mi (12.60 km^{2})
  - Land: 4.85 sq mi (12.55 km^{2})
  - Water: 0.023 sq mi (0.06 km^{2})
- Elevation: 240 ft (73 m)

Population (2020)
  - Total: 2,033
  - Estimate (2025): 1,982 ▼
  - Density: 419.6/sq mi (162.01/km^{2})
- Time zone: UTC-6 (Central (CST))
  - Summer (DST): UTC-5 (CDT)
- ZIP code: 72024
- Area code: 870
- FIPS code: 05-11500
- GNIS feature ID: 2403994
- Website: www.carlislear.org

Carlisle is a city in Lonoke County, Arkansas, United States. It is the easternmost municipality within the Little Rock–North Little Rock–Conway Metropolitan Statistical Area. Carlisle was incorporated in 1878. As of the 2020 census it had a population of 2,033.

== Geography ==
Carlisle is located in eastern Lonoke County at 34°47′10″N 91°44′41″W (34.786109, -91.744835). Interstate 40 passes through the northern side of the city, with access from Exit 183 (Highway 13). I-40 leads east 57 miles (92 km) to Forrest City and west 29 miles (47 km) to North Little Rock. U.S. Route 70 passes through the center of Carlisle as Park Street and serves as a local highway parallel to I-40. US-70 leads east 9 miles (14 km) to Hazen and west the same distance to Lonoke, the county seat. Arkansas Highway 13 passes through the west side of Carlisle and leads north 16 miles (26 km) to Hickory Plains and south 17 miles (27 km) to Humnoke.

According to the United States Census Bureau, Carlisle has a total area of 4.9 square miles (13 km^{2}), of which 4.9 square miles (13 km^{2}) are land and 0.04 square miles (0.10 km^{2}), or 0.48%, are water. Bayou Two Prairie, a southeast-flowing tributary of Bayou Meto, touches the southwest corner of the city limits.

== Demographics ==
Historical population
| Census | Pop. | Note | %± |
|---|---|---|---|
| 1880 | 159 | | — |
| 1890 | 185 | | 16.4% |
| 1900 | 212 | | 14.6% |
| 1910 | 516 | | 143.4% |
| 1920 | 602 | | 16.7% |
| 1930 | 907 | | 50.7% |
| 1940 | 1,080 | | 19.1% |
| 1950 | 1,396 | | 29.3% |
| 1960 | 1,514 | | 8.5% |
| 1970 | 2,048 | | 35.3% |
| 1980 | 2,567 | | 25.3% |
| 1990 | 2,253 | | −12.2% |
| 2000 | 2,304 | | 2.3% |
| 2010 | 2,214 | | −3.9% |
| 2020 | 2,033 | | −8.2% |
| 2025 (est.) | 1,982 | ▼ | −2.5% |
U.S. Decennial Census; 2015 Estimate

=== 2020 census ===
Carlisle racial composition
| Race | Number | Percentage |
|---|---|---|
| White (non-Hispanic) | 1,613 | 79.34% |
| Black or African American (non-Hispanic) | 271 | 13.33% |
| Native American | 6 | 0.3% |
| Asian | 6 | 0.3% |
| Pacific Islander | 2 | 0.1% |
| Other/Mixed | 79 | 3.89% |
| Hispanic or Latino | 56 | 2.75% |

As of the 2020 census, there were 2,033 people, 896 households, and 637 families residing in the city. The median age was 45.3 years. 21.4% of residents were under the age of 18 and 23.8% of residents were 65 years of age or older. For every 100 females there were 90.4 males, and for every 100 females age 18 and over there were 87.3 males age 18 and over.

0.0% of residents lived in urban areas, while 100.0% lived in rural areas.

Of households in Carlisle, 28.5% had children under the age of 18 living in them. Of all households, 42.5% were married-couple households, 19.6% were households with a male householder and no spouse or partner present, and 34.0% were households with a female householder and no spouse or partner present. About 31.8% of all households were made up of individuals and 16.9% had someone living alone who was 65 years of age or older.

There were 994 housing units, of which 13.4% were vacant. The homeowner vacancy rate was 4.8% and the rental vacancy rate was 9.0%.

=== 2000 census ===
As of the census of 2000, there were 2,304 people, 955 households, and 645 families residing in the city. The population density was 471.7 inhabitants per square mile (182.1/km^{2}). There were 1,029 housing units at an average density of 210.7 per square mile (81.4/km^{2}). The racial makeup of the city was 86.28% White, 12.46% Black or African American, 0.52% Native American, 0.22% Asian, and 0.52% from two or more races. 0.56% of the population were Hispanic or Latino of any race.

There were 954 households, out of which 27.5% had children under the age of 18 living with them, 52.9% were married couples living together, 11.3% had a female householder with no husband present, and 32.4% were non-families. 29.9% of all households were made up of individuals, and 15.9% had someone living alone who was 65 years of age or older. The average household size was 2.32 and the average family size was 2.87.

In the city, the population was spread out, with 22.9% under the age of 18, 7.5% from 18 to 24, 24.5% from 25 to 44, 24.8% from 45 to 64, and 20.3% who were 65 years of age or older. The median age was 41 years. For every 100 females, there were 88.9 males. For every 100 females age 18 and over, there were 80.8 males.

The median income for a household in the city was $30,086, and the median income for a family was $39,853. Males had a median income of $30,292 versus $20,563 for females. The per capita income for the city was $15,725. About 10.5% of families and 15.5% of the population were below the poverty line, including 16.3% of those under age 18 and 26.7% of those age 65 or over.

== Education ==
Public education for early childhood, elementary and secondary school students is provided from:

- Carlisle School District (primary), which leads to graduation from Carlisle High School.

== Notable people ==
- Johnny Adams, jockey and racehorse trainer; born in Carlisle, raised in Iola, Kansas
- Maurice Britt, Medal of Honor recipient from World War II; first Republican lieutenant governor of Arkansas since Reconstruction; born in Carlisle and reared in Lonoke
- Mitch Petrus, former NFL offensive lineman for the New York Giants
