= Wilma Walker =

American politician

Member of the Arkansas House of Representatives from the 65th district
- In office 1996–2002
- Preceded by: William Townsend
- Succeeded by: Buddy Blair

Personal details
- Born: March 3, 1938 (age 88) College Station, Arkansas
- Party: Democratic

Wilma Walker (born March 3, 1938) is an American politician. She served in the Arkansas House of Representatives from 1996 to 2002.

== Biography ==
Walker was born March 3, 1938 in College Station, Arkansas. She was first elected to the Arkansas House of Representatives in 1996, where, after winning the Democratic primary against former congressional aide Paul Kimbrough, she was elected unopposed in the general election. She was re-elected in 1998 and 2000, before retiring in 2002.

On July 4, 2015, the civic center in College Station was renamed the Wilma J. Walker Civic Center in her honor.
