= Arkansas Radio Network =

Radio network in Arkansas, United States

- Type: Radio network
- Country: United States
- Headquarters: 700 Wellington Hills Road; Little Rock, AR 72211

Ownership
- Owner: Arkansas Radio Network

History
- Launch date: 1967; 59 years ago
- Closed: March 20, 2022; 4 years ago

Arkansas Radio Network (ARN) was a statewide radio network serving radio stations in the state of Arkansas. ARN was headquartered in Little Rock, Arkansas operating from its flagship station KARN-FM and ended its existence under the ownership of Cumulus Media.

== History ==
ARN began their broadcasting activities in 1967 and for 55 years provided affiliates in Arkansas top news headlines, agriculture business news, sports, and specialty programming.

The Network started as the Delta Farm Network, an early morning program by KARK Farm Director Bob Buice, who also appeared on KARK-TV. Known for his velvet-like voice, he also did a weekend program on the Network for many years called Uncle Bob's Stories from the Bible.

The network later expanded to include the AP&L (Arkansas Power and Light, later Entergy) Live Better Electrically Hour, a program of music played in the late morning and broadcast over KARK-FM's 100 kW signal. Ted Snider purchased KARK AM-FM from Mullins Broadcasting and founded the Arkansas Radio Network with newscasts provided by KARK-TV Newscasters (Don Corbett and Les Bolton) and Sportscaster Jim Elder. KARK was distributed by KARK-FM or by relays through other FM stations (KNBY-FM in Newport to KRLW-Walnut Ridge as an example).

ARN's growth came in the early 1980s, when distribution moved to satellite, although the number of affiliates had been growing into the 1970s. ARN was a staple across the state in the 1980s and 1990s, with the newscast broadcast at :55 minutes past each hour. Bob Buice was succeeded as Ag Director by John Philpot, and later by Stewert Doan.

In mid-February 2022, Cumulus Media (which acquired ARN through its 2011 acquisition of Citadel Broadcasting) informed ARN's eighteen remaining affiliates that it planned to suspend the network's operations effective March 20.

== See also ==
- KARN-FM
