= Arkansas Negro Boys' Industrial School =

Juvenile correctional facility, open 1927–1968

Coordinates: 34.6037°N 92.1922°W

- Interactive map of Arkansas Negro Boys' Industrial School
- Location: Arkansas
- Opened: 1927
- Closed: 1968

The Arkansas Negro Boys' Industrial School (1927–1968) was a juvenile correctional facility for black male youth in Arkansas. There were two locations in 1936, one in Jefferson County and one in Wrightsville 10 miles (16 km) southeast of Little Rock. A fire in 1959 at the children's dormitory killed 21 victims. According to a 1967 lawsuit, the one in Jefferson County near Pine Bluff was known as White Boys School and held whites.

== Prelude ==
The NBIS mission was to place children – who would otherwise have been sent to adult prisons – on its working cotton farm, and the first superintendent was Dr. Tandy Washington Coggs. As of March 1959, the Wrightsville school had 69 boys aged between 13 and 17. According to "Negro superintendent of the reform school" L. R. Gaines, "most of the boys in the dormitory were in for minor offenses such as hubcap stealing, or because their parents had split and there was no place for them to go." The boys lived in a 1936 Works Progress Administration building described by Time as "rickety". Governor of Arkansas Orval Faubus (perhaps best known for his role in the Little Rock school segregation fight) visited the school in January 1958, saying "They really need help. They are using some old wood stoves which should be replaced", but Faubus had in fact reduced the budget by $7,100. Graduate student Gordon D. Morgan wrote a report in which he stated, "Many boys go for days with only rags for clothes ... More than half of them wear neither socks nor underwear during [the winter] of 1955-56".

== Fire ==
In the pre-dawn morning of March 5, 1959, a fire was set in the dormitory of the Wrightsville facility. Arthur Ray Poole, aged 16, one of two inmate "sergeants" with minor responsibility, smelled the smoke. Police never investigated to determine who or what may have caused the fire, although many claims have been made. The doors had been locked into the dormitory, and the windows covered with "heavy gauge wire mesh", making escape nearly impossible. It is noted that the equivalent school for white children did not have a protocol of locking their doors. O. F. "Charley" Meadows, a 16-year-old night sergeant, helped in breaking open one window, allowing for egress. Forty-eight boys managed to escape, while 21 burned to death.

== Aftermath ==
The families of the deceased said that authorities told them that 14 of the dead boys were wrapped in newspapers and deposited in an unmarked grave. The gravesite is located at Haven of Rest Cemetery in Little Rock, Arkansas. There was nothing to denote that the children buried there until 2018 when a plaque was donated to the site. On the 50th anniversary of the fire, some families of the dead held a press conference at the Arkansas State Capitol.

Segregationist Governor of Arkansas Orval Faubus asked a committee to investigate the fire. The committee concluded that the correctional facility, the State of Arkansas, and the local community held responsibility for the incident, but recommended no course of action. A Pulaski County grand jury returned no indictments, but stated:

The blame can be placed on lots of shoulders for the tragedy: the Board of Directors, to a certain extent, who might have pointed out through newspaper and other publicity the extreme hazards and plight of the school; the Superintendent and his staff, who perhaps continued to do the best they could in a resigned fashion when they had nothing to do with [it]; the State Administration, one right after another through the past years, who allowed conditions to become so disreputable; the General Assembly of the State of Arkansas, who should have been so ashamed of conditions that they would have previously allowed sufficient money to have these conditions corrected; and finally on the people of Arkansas, who did nothing about it.

A KTHV report said that "somehow the story faded into the backdrop of the Civil Rights Movement." Frank Lawrence, brother of one of the victims, attempted to make a documentary and brought the fire more widespread attention in the early 21st century.

The land once occupied by the unit now houses the Arkansas Department of Correction's Wrightsville Unit. For sixty years, there was no marker or memorial that indicated that the boys school existed or that the fire occurred. On April 25, 2019, a monument to the dead was unveiled at the Wrightsville Unit of the Arkansas Department of Correction.
