= Carlisle School District (Arkansas) =

School district in Arkansas, United States

Carisle School District

Location
- East 6th Street; Carlisle, Arkansas 72024 United States

District information
- Grades: PK–12
- Superintendent: William Rountree
- Accreditation: Arkansas Department of Education
- Schools: 2
- NCES District ID: 0503960

Students and staff
- Students: 810
- Teachers: 59.00 (on FTE basis)
- Staff: 112.00 (on FTE basis)
- Student–teacher ratio: 13.73
- Athletic conference: 2A Region 6 (2012–14)
- District mascot: Bison
- Colors: Black; Gold

Other information
- Website: www.carlisle.k12.ar.us

Carlisle School District is a public school district based in Carlisle, Arkansas, United States. The school district encompasses 233.26 square miles (604.1 km^{2}) of land in Lonoke County and Prairie County including all of the municipalities of Carlisle, Allport, and Humnoke.

The mascot and athletic emblem for the schools is the Bison with black and gold serving as the schools' colors. The varsity and junior varsity teams compete in the 2A Region 6 Conference as administered by the Arkansas Activities Association. The district and its schools are accredited by the Arkansas Department of Education (ADE).

== History ==
On July 1, 1998, the former Humnoke School District consolidated with the Carlisle School District.

In 2007, the district proposed a property tax increase because it believed that the increase could help it build a new high school. An Arkansas state law passed in 2005 had the potential of helping Carlisle School District pay for a new high school.

== Schools ==
- Carlisle High School, serving more than 350 students in grades 7 through 12.
- Carlisle Elementary School, serving more than 450 students in prekindergarten through grade 6.
