= Pine Bluff Weekly Herald =

Former newspaper from Pine Bluff, Arkansas

The Pine Bluff Weekly Herald was a newspaper in Pine Bluff, Arkansas. It debuted in 1900 and served the African American community. It was edited by J. C. Duke. S. W. Dawson was an associate editor.
