= KHTE-FM =

Radio station in England–Little Rock, Arkansas

Coordinates: 34.486°N 92.158°W

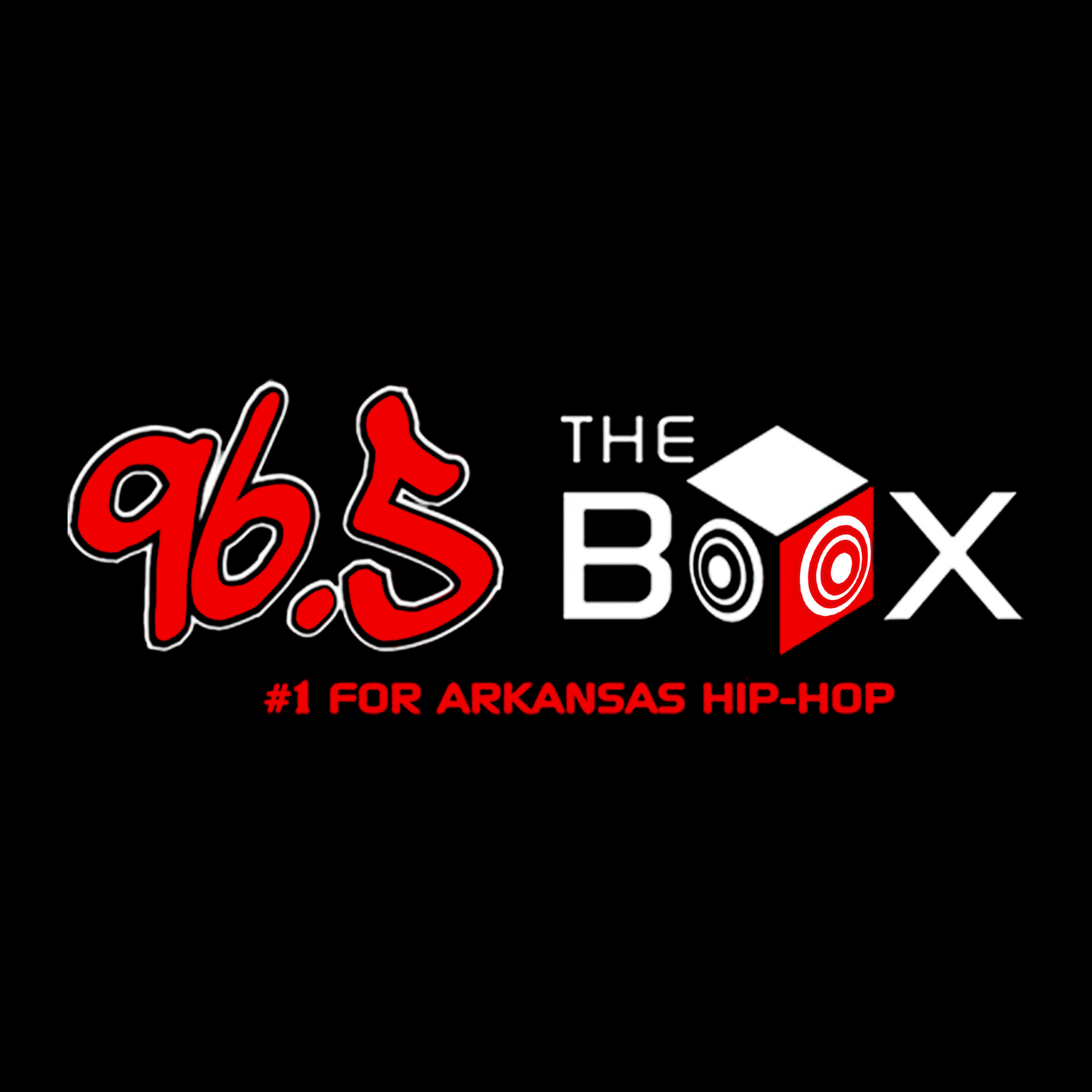
- England, Arkansas; United States
- Broadcast area: Little Rock (Central Arkansas)
- Frequency: 96.5 MHz
- Branding: 96.5 The Box

Programming
- Format: Mainstream urban
- Affiliations: Compass Media Networks

Ownership
- Owner: Alfred Bradford, IV; (Bradford Media Group, LLC)

History
- Former call signs: KLRA-FM (1988–1997); KHUG (1997–1999); KLEC (3/1999-6/1999); KLEC-FM (1999–2000); KHTE (5/2000-10/2000)
- Call sign meaning: K HoT England (former branding and city of license)

Technical information
- Licensing authority: FCC
- Facility ID: 40746
- Class: C3
- ERP: 10,500 watts
- HAAT: 151 meters

Links
- Public license information: Public file; LMS
- Webcast: Listen live
- Website: 965thebox.com

KHTE-FM (96.5 MHz) is a commercial mainstream urban radio station broadcasting from Little Rock, Arkansas, United States (licensed to England). KHTE-FM is currently branded as "96.5 The Box". The station's studios are located in West Little Rock, and the transmitter tower is in Redfield, Arkansas.

KHTE-FM, whose previous formats were Rhythmic contemporary and later Urban contemporary known as "Hot 96.5", began switching directions to a 1990s-based Top 40 format in August 2009, only to adopt an Adult Top 40 direction just two weeks after the flip, and by 2011 evolved to Top 40/CHR. The move allowed them to compete more effectively with Top 40 rival KLAL for 18- to 49-year-old female listeners and to counter KLAL's rock-leaning playlist.

In January 2013, KHTE-FM dropped Top 40/CHR for News/Talk, picking up the format full time from KKSP after it went full-time with their sports format.

On March 17, 2015, it was announced that Salem Media Group, would take over operations of KHTE and KKSP through a local marketing agreement with Crain. On April 2, 2015, KHTE-FM rebranded as "96.5 The Answer", matching the names of fellow stations owned by Salem.

On August 1, 2018, KHTE changed its format to urban contemporary, branded as "96.5 The Box", competing against KIPR & KPZK (now KFOG).
