= Carlisle High School (Arkansas) =

Location
- 145 Raborn Road; Carlisle, Arkansas 72024; United States; 34°47′12″N 91°44′18″W

Information
- School type: Public (government funded)
- Status: Open
- School district: Carlisle School District
- NCES District ID: 0503960
- Authority: Arkansas Department of Education (ADE)
- CEEB code: 040380
- NCES School ID: 050396000140
- Teaching staff: 27.62 (on FTE basis)
- Grades: 7–12
- Enrollment: 309 (2016-17)
- Student to teacher ratio: 12.93
- Education system: ADE Smart Core curriculum
- Classes offered: Regular, Advanced Placement
- Campus type: Rural
- Colors: Black and gold
- Athletics: Cross Country, Basketball, Baseball, Softball, Track & Field
- Athletics conference: 2A Region 6 (2012–14)
- Mascot: Bison
- Team name: Carlisle Bison
- Affiliation: Arkansas Activities Association
- Website: www.carlisle.k12.ar.us/62353_3

Carlisle High School is a comprehensive public high school serving students in grades 7 through 12 in the rural community of Carlisle, Arkansas, United States. It is one of four public high schools located in Lonoke County, and with 240 students in the 2010–11 school year, it is the largest of three high schools administered by the Carlisle School District.

== Academics ==
The school is accredited by the Arkansas Department of Education (ADE). The assumed course of study follows the ADE Smart Core curriculum developed the Arkansas Department of Education (ADE), which requires students to complete at least 22 credit units before graduation. Students engage in regular (core) and career focus courses and exams and may select Advanced Placement (AP) coursework and exams that may lead to college credit.

== Athletics ==
The Carlisle High School mascot and athletic emblem is the bison with the school colors of black and gold.

The Carlisle Bisons participates in various interscholastic activities in the 2A Classification within the 2A Region 6 Conference as administered by the Arkansas Activities Association. The Bisons school athletic activities include football, golf (boys/girls), cross country (girls), basketball (boys/girls), swimming (boys/girls), and track and field (boys/girls).

- Track and field: The boys track team are 2-time state track champions (1975, 1977).
