= KMTL =

Radio station in Sherwood, Arkansas

- Sherwood, Arkansas; United States
- Broadcast area: Little Rock metropolitan area
- Frequency: 760 kHz

Programming
- Format: Regional Mexican

Ownership
- Owner: Jose Carlos Moron; (Radio La Raza, LLC)

History
- First air date: 1984

Technical information
- Licensing authority: FCC
- Facility ID: 23871
- Class: D
- Power: 10,000 watts days only 250 watts (translator)
- Transmitter coordinates: 34°49′34″N 92°12′19″W
- Translator: (97.9 MHz) K250CF (Sherwood)

Links
- Public license information: Public file; LMS
- Webcast: Listen Live
- Website: radiolaraza.com

KMTL (760 kHz) is a commercial AM radio station licensed to Sherwood, Arkansas, and serving the Little Rock metropolitan area. The station is currently owned by Jose Carlos Moron, through licensee Radio La Raza, LLC. It airs a Regional Mexican radio format.

KMTL is a daytimer. 760 AM is a clear-channel frequency, on which WJR in Detroit is the dominant Class A station. KMTL is powered at 10,000 watts, using a non-directional antenna. It must leave the air from sunset to sunrise in order to protect the nighttime skywave signal of WJR. The transmitter is off Tower Road in Sherwood. Programming can be heard around the clock on FM translator station K250CF at 97.9 MHz in Sherwood.

== History ==
KMTL was built and signed on in 1984 by the Sherwood Broadcasting Company, owned by the Shields family. In 1988, George V. Domerese bought KMTL. Under Domerese's ownership, the station broadcast a gospel format. George V. Domerese died in 2017, leaving ownership of the station to his estate.

Heavy rainfall in 2018 knocked KMTL off the air as of March 1, and instead of returning it to air, the Domerese estate opted to sell. In August, the estate filed to sell KMTL to Radio La Patrona for $100,000. With the sale still pending, in order to retain its license, the station resumed operations under special temporary authority in late February 2019 with 1,000 watts.

Effective June 2, 2022, KMTL and its translator K250CF were sold to Jose Carlos Moron's Radio La Raza for $70,000.
