= Albert Pendarvis =

American Christian radio broadcaster

Albert Pendarvis, commonly known as The Old Trailblazer, is an American Christian radio broadcaster.

== Radio Missions ==
Pendarvis is the pastor of Radio Missions, a ministry formerly based in Algiers, New Orleans, United States. The founder of this ministry was L. R. Shelton Sr.; Pendarvis is the fifth pastor of the work.

The overall ministry is named Radio Missions. The church itself is called the First Baptist Church of Algiers. The church formerly met in the Metropolitan Tabernacle, a former vaudeville theater in Algiers. Two international radio broadcasts (in America, Northern Ireland, and now shortwave) originate from the ministry: the Voice of Truth (a weekly 30-minute broadcast of Shelton Sr.'s messages) and the Old Trailblazer (a weekday 15-minute broadcast by Pendarvis). The local church broadcasts its two Sunday morning services, the Bible School of the Air and the Worship Hour, on WVOG in New Orleans and all of its services on the internet. The radio broadcasts produced by the ministry are heard on over 130 radio stations. In addition, the ministry operates in several other areas, including a bookstore called the Radio Bible and Bookroom, which sells Bibles and Christian books and the Old Puritan Press, which produces printed materials. The ministry also publishes a quarterly magazine, The Voice of Truth.

In 2005, Hurricane Katrina destroyed Radio Missions' facilities in Algiers, and the ministry relocated to their chapel in Baton Rouge, near Pendarvis' home. The ministry did not miss any broadcast of their radio programs or church services during this transition.

== Doctrinal position ==
The Radio Missions Ministry is Calvinist in their Theology; and while they are not part of any denomination, the ministry believes the London Baptist Confession and they are Reformed Baptists on the order of Charles Spurgeon or Arthur Pink. The books sold by the ministry are predominantly from this point of view.

The Ministry is strongly dispensationalist in its eschatology, and has numerous teaching series by Pendarvis and his predecessor Shelton available which discuss the Book of Revelation from this perspective. Similarly, the Ministry teaches the premillennial view of eschatology. (The Ministry bookstore sells the Scofield Reference Bible and speakers reference it occasionally.)

The primary emphasis of the Ministry is on "awakening" sinners, that is showing mankind its sinful condition (the total depravity doctrine), and pointing to Christ the Remedy for those who are convicted of their need (or awakened) and fully see their lost and helpless condition before God, showing their only hope is found in Jesus Christ. Almost every message sent out by the ministry stresses this in some way or other. The reason for this is their primary belief that, through shallow evangelism, many people have slipped into the Christian profession without conviction, knowing neither new birth nor repentance nor true faith in the Crucified Saviour. Radio Missions claims to be one of the few strictly Calvinist voices in religious broadcasting.

== Mission places ==
Radio Missions has several small groups which meet in "mission places" (as they call them) for services. These are scattered throughout the immediate area of New Orleans, including Texas, Alabama, Louisiana, and Mississippi. Pastor Pendarvis personally visits these mission places periodically to preach and has several lay pastors who visit these missions.

== Fellowship Day ==
Radio Missions has a Fellowship Day in both the spring and fall where local church members and listeners to their broadcasts from across the Nation meet for fellowship, food, singing, and services. Until 2005, when Katrina forced a relocation, this was held at the church in Algiers, New Orleans. Recent Fellowship Day meetings have been held at the Baton Rouge facility. Typically, these meetings have extra services which are broadcast over the Internet.

== King James Only advocacy ==
King James Only advocacy is not a major emphasis of the Radio Missions Ministry, but the Old Trailblazer radio program frequently touches upon this topic. The Radio Bible and Book Room sells many books and audio presentations by King James Only advocates. The bookstore sells only the King James Bible text, and no other version. In fact, Albert Pendarvis has stated that the King James Version is the "only verbally inspired" translation available today.

The Old Trailblazer broadcast featured a lengthy series of messages on the so-called "Anti-Christ Bible" (the Revised Standard Version), based on notes by L. R. Shelton Sr.
