= College Station, Arkansas =

- CDP
- Location in Pulaski County and the state of Arkansas
- Coordinates: 34°42′20″N 92°13′47″W
- Country: United States
- State: Arkansas
- County: Pulaski

Area
  - Total: 1.10 sq mi (2.86 km^{2})
  - Land: 1.09 sq mi (2.83 km^{2})
  - Water: 0.0077 sq mi (0.02 km^{2})
- Elevation: 312 ft (95 m)

Population (2020)
  - Total: 469
  - Density: 428.6/sq mi (165.47/km^{2})
- Time zone: UTC-6 (Central (CST))
  - Summer (DST): UTC-5 (CDT)
- ZIP code: 72053
- Area code: 501
- FIPS code: 05-14860
- GNIS feature ID: 2402786

College Station is a census-designated place (CDP) in Pulaski County, Arkansas, United States. As of the 2020 census, College Station had a population of 469. It is part of the Little Rock–North Little Rock–Conway Metropolitan Statistical Area.

== Geography ==
According to the United States Census Bureau, the CDP has a total area of 1.2 square miles (3.1 km^{2}), all land.

== Demographics ==
Historical population
Census	Pop.	Note	%±
2000	766		—
2010	600		−21.7%
2020	469		−21.8%
U.S. Decennial Census

=== Racial and ethnic composition ===
College Station CDP, Arkansas – Racial and ethnic composition Note: the US Census treats Hispanic/Latino as an ethnic category. This table excludes Latinos from the racial categories and assigns them to a separate category. Hispanics/Latinos may be of any race.
Race / Ethnicity (NH = Non-Hispanic)	Pop 2000	Pop 2010	Pop 2020	% 2000	% 2010	% 2020
White alone (NH)	40	43	15	5.22%	7.17%	3.20%
Black or African American alone (NH)	700	542	435	91.38%	90.33%	92.75%
Native American or Alaska Native alone (NH)	1	3	0	0.13%	0.50%	0.00%
Asian alone (NH)	6	0	0	0.78%	0.00%	0.00%
Native Hawaiian or Pacific Islander alone (NH)	0	0	0	0.00%	0.00%	0.00%
Other race alone (NH)	0	0	0	0.00%	0.00%	0.00%
Mixed race or Multiracial (NH)	13	8	11	1.70%	1.33%	2.35%
Hispanic or Latino (any race)	6	4	8	0.78%	0.67%	1.71%
Total	766	600	469	100.00%	100.00%	100.00%

=== 2020 census ===
As of the 2020 United States census, there were 469 people, 167 households, and 142 families residing in the CDP.

=== 2000 census ===
As of the census of 2000, there were 766 people, 260 households, and 171 families residing in the CDP. The population density was 683.0 inhabitants per square mile (263.7/km^{2}). There were 309 housing units at an average density of 275.5 per square mile (106.4/km^{2}). The racial makeup of the CDP was 1.48% White, 95.78% Black or African American, 0.13% Native American, 0.78% Asian, and 1.83% from two or more races. 0.78% of the population were Hispanic or Latino of any race.

There were 260 households, out of which 23.1% had children under the age of 18 living with them, 26.5% were married couples living together, 32.7% had a female householder with no husband present, and 34.2% were non-families. 30.8% of all households were made up of individuals, and 10.4% had someone living alone who was 65 years of age or older. The average household size was 2.67 and the average family size was 3.43.

In the CDP, the population was spread out, with 23.9% under the age of 18, 10.1% from 18 to 24, 22.8% from 25 to 44, 24.9% from 45 to 64, and 18.3% who were 65 years of age or older. The median age was 40 years. For every 100 females, there were 95.4 males. For every 100 females age 18 and over, there were 87.5 males.

The median income for a household in the CDP was $14,191, and the median income for a family was $14,464. Males had a median income of $25,893 versus $17,000 for females. The per capita income for the CDP was $9,498. About 60.2% of families and 53.1% of the population were below the poverty line, including 76.3% of those under age 18 and 28.3% of those age 65 or over.

== Education ==
It is within the Pulaski County Special School District. It is zoned to College Station Elementary School (which serves students in kindergarten through grade five), Fuller Middle School, and Wilbur D. Mills University Studies High School.

The Pulaski County SSD established a school in College Station. From 1949 to 1963, Otis Lee Walker was the principal of the school, which was central to the community of College Station. It was originally a single-room white frame building located in the main red-dirt road called Route 2 in Pulaski County. Route 2 is now known as Frazier Pike. Initially the school provided K-8 education, but during the 50s the higher grades of 7 and above were switched to Sweet Home, under the principalship of David Lyons who worked collaboratively with Otis Walker. Two additional frame buildings were added to the original location of the school providing for a cafeteria to accommodate school lunches and a space for school programs. A major fire of unknown origins destroyed much of the school during the late 1950s. The new facility was constructed at the current school location of 4710 Frazier Pike, Little Rock, Arkansas.

Shortly after court-mandated integration in the late 1960s, the black residents of College Station established a "boycott school" known as the Freedom School in protest of a busing plan. This school had an enrollment of 300, but existed for only two weeks.

== Notable person ==
- Wilma Walker, Arkansas state legislator
