= KIPR =

Radio station in Pine Bluff–Little Rock, Arkansas

Coordinates: 34.370°N 92.169°W

- Pine Bluff, Arkansas; United States
- Broadcast area: Little Rock (Central Arkansas)
- Frequency: 92.3 MHz
- Branding: Power 92 Jams

Programming
- Format: Urban contemporary

Ownership
- Owner: Cumulus Media; (Radio License Holding CBC, LLC)
- Sister stations: KAAY; KURB; KARN-FM; KLAL

History
- First air date: 1959 (as KOTN-FM)
- Former call signs: KOTN-FM (1959–1980); KFXE (1980–1987)
- Call sign meaning: Little Rock (transposed letters) Power

Technical information
- Licensing authority: FCC
- Facility ID: 13925
- Class: C1
- ERP: 100,000 watts
- HAAT: 286 meters (938 ft)

Links
- Public license information: Public file; LMS
- Webcast: Listen live
- Website: www.power923.com

KIPR (92.3 FM, "Power 92 Jams") is a commercial radio station carrying an urban contemporary format located in Little Rock, Arkansas and licensed to Pine Bluff. It is owned by Cumulus Media. The station's studios are located in West Little Rock, and the transmitter tower is located in Jefferson, northwest of Pine Bluff. Due to the transmitter location emitting 100 kilowatts, the signal covers most of Central Arkansas including places like Brinkley, North Little Rock, Conway, Gould, Fordyce and Dumas.

== Station history ==
KIPR airs an urban contemporary format, which was launched in 1988. (Its roots can be traced back to KPWR in Los Angeles due to having KPWR's radio consultant Don Kelly serving as KIPR's programming consultant at the time). Until 2026, it simulcast on sister station KFOG (1250 AM), although the transmitter site for this station is in College Station, Arkansas (just south of Clinton National Airport). As an urban-formatted station, KIPR's main competition comes from direct competitors KHTE-FM and urban AC station KOKY, which was placed into a separate trust in 2007 to address ownership concentration concerns but remains mainly operated by Cumulus.

KIPR's original owner was Buddy Deane, a disc jockey who worked in radio stations in the Little Rock and Memphis markets before achieving fame in Baltimore with a self-titled program that would inspire the 1988 original, Tony-award-winning musical, 2007 musical film remake, and 2016 live television special of Hairspray.
