= KVLO =

- Humnoke, Arkansas; United States
- Broadcast area: East Central Arkansas
- Frequency: 101.7 MHz
- Branding: 101.7 Jack FM

Programming
- Format: Adult hits
- Network: Jack FM

Ownership
- Owner: Arkansas County Broadcasters, Inc.

History
- First air date: January 23, 1995 (as KARN-FM)
- Former call signs: KARN-FM (1995–1997); KKRN (1997–2004); KPZK-FM (2004–2005)

Technical information
- Licensing authority: FCC
- Facility ID: 28114
- Class: A
- ERP: 6,000 watts
- HAAT: 100 meters (330 ft)
- Transmitter coordinates: 34°32′59″N 91°45′27″W

Links
- Public license information: Public file; LMS

KVLO (101.7 FM) is a radio station in Humnoke, Arkansas and serves the area east of Little Rock. It airs an adult hits format, branded as "101.7 Jack FM".

== History ==
On July 3, 2012, KVLO split from its simulcast with gospel-formatted KPZK-FM and changed its format to adult hits, branded as "101.7 Jack FM".
