= KFOG (AM) =

Former simulcast of KIPR
- Little Rock, Arkansas; United States
- Broadcast area: Little Rock metropolitan area
- Frequency: 1250 kHz
- Branding: Power 92 Jams

Programming
- Format: Urban contemporary

Ownership
- Owner: Cumulus Media; (Radio License Holding CBC, LLC)
- Sister stations: KARN; KAAY; KIPR; KURB; KARN-FM; KLAL

History
- First air date: 1928 (as KGHI)
- Last air date: 2026
- Former call signs: KGHI (1928–1959); KAJI (1959–1963); KALO (1963–1977); KLAZ (1977–1979); KOKY (1979–1988); KZOU (1988–1991); KURB (1991–1997); KLIH (1997–2004); KPZK (2004–2019)
- Call sign meaning: warehoused former heritage calls of what is now KNBR-FM in San Francisco (for the city's fog layer)

Technical information
- Licensing authority: FCC
- Facility ID: 24150
- Class: B
- Power: 2,000 watts day; 1,200 watts night
- Transmitter coordinates: 34°42′5″N 92°13′3″W

Links
- Public license information: Public file; LMS
- Webcast: Listen live
- Website: www.power923.com

KFOG (1250 kHz, "Power 92 Jams") was a commercial AM radio station located in Little Rock, Arkansas. It simulcast the urban contemporary radio format of KIPR (92.3 FM) and was owned by Cumulus Media. The station's studios were located in West Little Rock and the transmitter was located in College Station.

Until September 6, 2019, the station was called KPZK (a dual meaning for "People's" and Pulaski County), when Cumulus warehoused the heritage calls of KFOG in San Francisco (which had switched to a sports format as KNBR-FM) on the station to prevent competitor re-use in the San Francisco Bay Area.

The Federal Communications Commission cancelled the station's license on September 23, 2026.
