= Wrightsville, Arkansas =

City in Arkansas, USA

- City
- City of Wrightsville
- Motto: People, Progress, Prosperity
- Location in Pulaski County and Arkansas

- Location in Arkansas Wrightsville (the United States) Wrightsville (North America)
- Coordinates: 34°36′42″N 92°13′02″W
- Country: United States
- State: Arkansas
- County: Pulaski
- Township: Big Rock
- Founded: July 14, 1873
- Incorporated: June 2, 1982

Government
  - Type: Mayor–Council
  - Mayor: Terry Mizer (I)
  - Council: Wrightsville City Council

Area
  - Total: 2.14 sq mi (5.53 km^{2})
  - Land: 2.12 sq mi (5.48 km^{2})
  - Water: 0.019 sq mi (0.05 km^{2})
- Elevation: 236 ft (72 m)

Population (2020)
  - Total: 1,542
  - Estimate (2025): 1,630 ▲
  - Density: 728.7/sq mi (281.34/km^{2})
- Time zone: UTC-6 (Central (CST))
  - Summer (DST): UTC-5 (CDT)
- ZIP code: 72183
- Area code: 501
- FIPS code: 05-76970
- GNIS feature ID: 2405794
- Highways: Highway 365
- Major airport: Clinton Airport (LIT)
- Website: cityofwrightsville-ar.org

Wrightsville is a city in Pulaski County, Arkansas, United States. Its population was 1,542 at the 2020 census. It is part of the Little Rock–North Little Rock–Conway Metropolitan Statistical Area. Located on Highway 365, Wrightsville existed as an unincorporated community for more than a century before it was incorporated late in the 20th century. Since 1981, it has been home to a major Arkansas Department of Corrections facility, which is the principal employer.

== Geography ==
According to the United States Census Bureau, the city has a total area of 2.1 square miles (5.4 km^{2}), of which 2.0 square miles (5.2 km^{2}) is land and 0.49% is water.

== Arkansas Negro Boys' Industrial School ==
The Arkansas Negro Boys' Industrial School (1927-1968) was a juvenile correctional facility for black male youth in Arkansas. There were two locations in 1936, one in Jefferson County and one in Wrightsville 10 miles (16 km) southeast of Little Rock. A fire in 1959 at the children's dormitory killed twenty-one victims. There were 59 boys locked inside of the school intentionally when it was set ablaze.

== Demographics ==
Historical population
Census	Pop.	Note	%±
1990	1,062		—
2000	1,368		28.8%
2010	2,114		54.5%
2020	1,542		−27.1%
2025 (est.)	1,630	▲	5.7%
U.S. Decennial Census

=== 2020 census ===
Wrightsville racial composition
Race	Number	Percentage
White (non-Hispanic)	544	35.28%
Black or African American (non-Hispanic)	923	59.86%
Native American	3	0.19%
Asian	3	0.19%
Pacific Islander	4	0.26%
Other/Mixed	20	1.3%
Hispanic or Latino	45	2.92%

As of the 2020 census, Wrightsville had a population of 1,542 and 143 families residing in the city. The median age was 40.5 years. 7.3% of residents were under the age of 18 and 11.5% of residents were 65 years of age or older. For every 100 females there were 397.4 males, and for every 100 females age 18 and over there were 447.5 males.

37.7% of residents lived in urban areas, while 62.3% lived in rural areas.

There were 295 households in Wrightsville, of which 26.4% had children under the age of 18 living in them. Of all households, 25.8% were married-couple households, 28.1% were households with a male householder and no spouse or partner present, and 40.7% were households with a female householder and no spouse or partner present. About 37.9% of all households were made up of individuals and 12.9% had someone living alone who was 65 years of age or older.

There were 345 housing units, of which 14.5% were vacant. The homeowner vacancy rate was 1.3% and the rental vacancy rate was 16.5%.

=== 2000 census ===
As of the census of 2000, there were 1,368 people, 262 households, and 193 families residing in the city. The population density was 667.6 inhabitants per square mile (257.8/km^{2}). There were 291 housing units at an average density of 142.0 per square mile (54.8/km^{2}). The racial makeup of the city was 24.12% White, 74.56% Black or African American, 0.07% Native American, 0.29% Asian, 0.29% from other races, and 0.66% from two or more races. 0.29% of the population were Hispanic or Latino of any race.

There were 262 households, out of which 32.4% had children under the age of 18 living with them, 42.4% were married couples living together, 24.8% had a female householder with no husband present, and 26.3% were non-families. 23.7% of all households were made up of individuals, and 8.0% had someone living alone who was 65 years of age or older. The average household size was 2.86 and the average family size was 3.37.

In the city, the population was spread out, with 16.5% under the age of 18, 13.7% from 18 to 24, 44.0% from 25 to 44, 18.6% from 45 to 64, and 7.1% who were 65 years of age or older. The median age was 34 years. For every 100 females, there were 250.8 males. For every 100 females age 18 and over, there were 299.3 males.

The median income for a household in the city was $28,036, and the median income for a family was $32,500. Males had a median income of $26,563 versus $20,000 for females. The per capita income for the city was $9,518. About 21.5% of families and 22.6% of the population were below the poverty line, including 27.4% of those under age 18 and 28.0% of those age 65 or over.

== Economy ==
The Arkansas Department of Corrections Wrightsville Unit focuses on educational and rehabilitative services, aiding in workforce preparation, substance abuse recovery, and other aspects of re-entry into society for as many as 850 male and 200 female inmates. A 212-inmate capacity boot camp program was administered at the site for first-time non-violent inmates, along with a 50-inmate capacity female work release program, operated by the ADC since 1990. Since 2011, faith based program Pathway to Freedom has served the Hawkins Men unit, and the Hawkins female unit has taken up industry and food services programs. Wrightsville men's unit houses many programs: Agriculture – Beef Production, Forage Production; Arkansas State Police Barracks (located in Little Rock); Braille Program; Canine Unit; GED Program; WAGE job skills; Industry Operations – Graphic Arts, Furniture Manufacturing, and Data Imaging; Reentry Program; Regional Maintenance; Substance Abuse Therapeutic Community Program (TC); Substance Abuse Treatment Program (SATP); and ACI Warehouse vocational program. It is a major employer in the community, with a staff of 169 employees in various fields. The land occupied by the unit formerly housed the Arkansas Negro Boys' Industrial School.

Wrightsville also serves as the city of license for one Little Rock area radio station, KLAL-FM, and the U.S. Postal Service operates the Wrightsville Post Office.

== Education ==
Wrightsville is within the Pulaski County Special School District. It is zoned to Daisy Bates Elementary School, Mills Middle School, and Wilbur D. Mills University Studies High School.

== See also ==
- List of municipalities in Arkansas
