= KAAY =

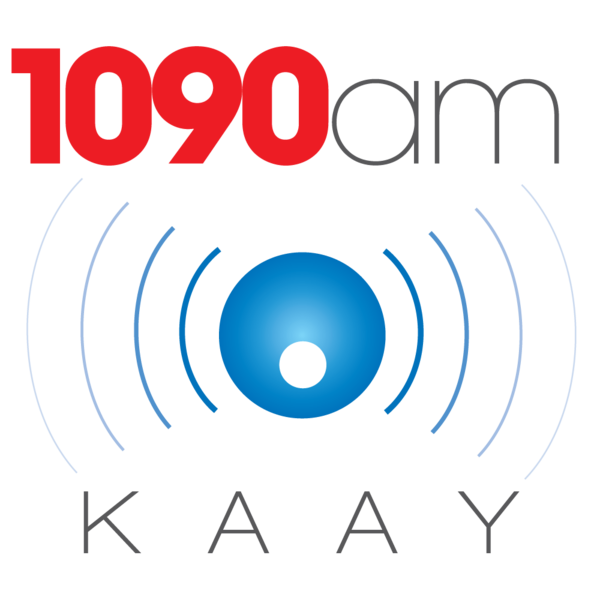
- Little Rock, Arkansas; United States
- Broadcast area: Little Rock metropolitan area
- Frequency: 1090 kHz
- Branding: 1090 AM KAAY

Programming
- Format: Christian radio

Ownership
- Owner: Cumulus Media; (Radio License Holding CBC, LLC)
- Sister stations: KARN-FM; KIPR; KLAL; KURB

History
- First air date: December 20, 1924 (as KTHS at 800 AM)
- Former call signs: KTHS (1924–1962)
- Former frequencies: 800 kHz (1924–1927); 780 kHz (1927–1928); 600 kHz (1928–1929); 1040 kHz (1929–1934)
- Call sign meaning: Similarity to onetime sister station WAKY in Louisville, Kentucky

Technical information
- Licensing authority: FCC
- Facility ID: 33253
- Class: B
- Power: 50,000 watts day; 3,400 watts night
- Transmitter coordinates: 34°36′1.4″N 92°13′26.8″W

Links
- Public license information: Public file; LMS
- Webcast: Listen live; Listen live (via Audacy); Listen live (via iHeartRadio)
- Website: www.1090kaay.com

KAAY (1090 AM) is a commercial radio station in Little Rock, Arkansas, owned by Cumulus Media. It airs a Christian radio format of instruction and preaching, with most of the schedule made up of brokered programming featuring local and national religious leaders, including Charles Stanley, Jim Daly, John F. MacArthur, and Albert Pendarvis. Overnight, automated contemporary Christian music is heard. The station's studios are located in West Little Rock, and the transmitter is located off McDonald Road in Wrightsville. KAAY is Arkansas's primary entry point station for the Emergency Alert System.

== History ==
=== Early years in Hot Springs ===
KAAY first signed on as KTHS on December 20, 1924, in Hot Springs, Arkansas. It operated on 600, 780, 800 and 1040 kilocycles at different times in its early days. By the 1930s, it moved to its current frequency of 1090 kHz, with 10,000 watts in the daytime, allowing it to be easily heard in the larger capital city of Little Rock, about 50 miles to the northeast. KTHS was an affiliate of the NBC Blue Network, continuing with the affiliation when the network was renamed ABC in 1945. KTHS was the founding station for the Lum and Abner Show in 1932.

=== Move to Little Rock ===
In 1953, KTHS got a big boost in power, going to its current 50,000 watts, and it also switched its city of license to Little Rock. It became an affiliate of the CBS Radio Network. Two years later, it signed on KTHV (channel 11) which affiliated with the CBS television network. In 1962, the TV and radio stations were sold to separate owners, with KTHS bought by LIN Broadcasting.

=== Top 40 era ===
The new owners turned KTHS into a top 40 station in 1962, switching the call sign to KAAY. In the 1960s, KAAY had plans to put a co-owned FM station on the air at 98.5 MHz, but due to the limited number of FM radios in those days, the project didn't get off the ground. KAAY was sold to Multimedia Radio in 1975; the following year, Multimedia bought an FM station at 94.1 MHz, KEZQ, that aired a beautiful music format.

During the station's heyday, KAAY featured a full-service top 40 format and was the dominant contemporary station for most of the state of Arkansas. During the 1960s and 1970s, on-air personalities included Mike McCormick, Doc Holiday, Jonnie King, Buddy Karr, Ken Knight, Sonny Martin, and newscasters George J. Jennings, Wayne Moss, Phil North and Ray Lincoln of the Ray and Ram Program. The station also broadcast University of Arkansas football games.

KAAY's cult status was forged in the late 1960s, when, after 11p.m., the station abandoned the standard top 40 format for three hours of underground music with the program Beaker Street hosted by Clyde Clifford. Its nighttime signal extended well beyond Little Rock and Arkansas, covering much of the Great Plains and Mississippi Valley regions of the United States.

Owing to its 50,000-watt clear channel signal that could be received in Cuba, KAAY provided residents of the island nation an important cultural link to the outside world in the years following the Cuban Revolution. During the 1962 Bay of Pigs Invasion, the United States government used the station to broadcast anti-Castro propaganda while working to win the release of Cuban exiles who participated in the failed exercise. KAAY was an inspiration to Cuban rock musicians and rock fans who tuned into Beaker Street late at night, keeping themselves informed about American music and underground music in the 1970s. They listened undercover with Soviet-made transistor radios. In the late 1960s, the station's jingle started out with roaring thunder followed by a deep voice: "Fifty thousand watts of music power, K-double-A-Y, Little Rock".

=== Switch to religion ===
By 1980, listening to contemporary hits was shifting from AM to FM. The station tried moving to adult contemporary music and some country music. Eventually the station switched to an oldies sound, calling itself "Oldies 1090". At night, when the station's 50,000-watt signal could be heard over a large territory, the station aired nine hours of paid religious programming. In April 1985, KAAY was sold to the Beasley Broadcasting Group, which switched to a format of Southern gospel music and brokered religion. The FM station was sold to Signal Media, which owned KLRA.

In 1998, KAAY was bought by Citadel Broadcasting for $5 million. In 2011, Citadel Broadcasting merged with Cumulus Media, which continued the Christian programming. KAAY is Cumulus' only station with a religious format.

=== KAAY Rewound ===
On Labor Day weekend of 2003, the station returned to its roots with a historical segment called "KAAY Rewound". KAAY's Barry Mac and sister station KARN's Grant Merrill played 1960s and 1970s hits and took calls from all over the South. Clyde Clifford returned to talk about Beaker Street. The station at various times broadcasts a feature called "Radio Yesterday" which includes the memories of the station's top 40 heyday.

=== Transmitter site issues ===
The KAAY transmission facilities in Wrightsville have been vandalized several times. Copper thieves stole a large amount of transmission line, degrading the station's signal significantly. Roof damage allowed water to enter the MW-5 5,000-watt transmitter, knocking it off the air with a shorted high voltage power transformer. Station staff reportedly "wanted way too much for a new transformer", and ended up getting a Collins 5,000-watt transmitter from their sister station in Dallas. Technical staff couldn't run the MW-50A, only having a 7/8-inch coax purchased to get something on the air. In 2015, the station purchased a 3 1/8-inch (7.9 cm) transmission line and buried it 4 feet (1.2 m) underground to deter thieves and put the MW-50 back on at 50,000 watts day and 10,000 watts night. In 2017, KAAY purchased a new Nautel NX-50 transmitter, new coax cable and a new phasor to connect the end towers. Mike Patton was contracted to install and tune the phasor. That June, Daniel Appellof, assistant chief engineer for KAAY Citadel/Cumulus Media Little Rock from July 2006 to September 2017, was tasked to remove the old RCA transmitter to make room for the phasor and the NX50. He had left the company to move to Las Vegas to be closer to his family. In December 2017, there was a major shake up in the engineering department and Appellof was asked to return to Little Rock to finish the project. The new Nautel transmitter and the phasor were installed in early 2018, and in late February KAAY was back to 50,000 watts day and 50,000 watts directional at night. In May 2020, the westernmost tower collapsed, and the station filed for special temporary authority (STA) to operate at a reduced night power of 12,500 watts non-directional. As of July 2021, the station was still waiting on the owner of the tower site, Vertical Bridge, to make the repairs. In February, 2022, KAAY applied to the commission to transmit permanently with eighty (80) watts omnidirectionally during nighttime hours, but still 50,000 watts daytime, and becoming a class D station. By February 2026, KAAY ended up transmitting permanently with 3,400 watts during nighttime hours with the same directional antenna, but still 50,000 watts during the daytime with its omnidirectional antenna, and becoming a class B station.
