= Humnoke, Arkansas =

- City
- Location in Lonoke County, Arkansas

- Location in the United States
- Coordinates: 34°32′32″N 91°45′35″W
- Country: United States
- State: Arkansas
- County: Lonoke

Area
  - Total: 0.31 sq mi (0.81 km^{2})
  - Land: 0.31 sq mi (0.81 km^{2})
  - Water: 0 sq mi (0.00 km^{2})
- Elevation: 200 ft (61 m)

Population (2020)
  - Total: 219
  - Estimate (2025): 220 ▲
  - Density: 697.4/sq mi (269.28/km^{2})
- Time zone: UTC-6 (Central (CST))
  - Summer (DST): UTC-5 (CDT)
- ZIP code: 72072
- Area code: 501
- FIPS code: 05-33820
- GNIS feature ID: 2404742
- Website: humnokear.com

Humnoke is a city in Lonoke County, Arkansas, United States. As of the 2020 census, Humnoke had a population of 219. It is part of the Little Rock–North Little Rock–Conway Metropolitan Statistical Area.

== Geography ==
Humnoke is located in southeastern Lonoke County. U.S. Route 165 passes through the center of town, as Front Street, leading east 14 miles (23 km) to Stuttgart and west 12 miles (19 km) to England. Arkansas Highway 13 (Division Street) crosses US 165 in the center of Humnoke, leading north 17 miles (27 km) to Carlisle and south 12 miles (19 km) to Humphrey. Little Rock, the state capital, is 37 miles (60 km) to the northwest via US 165. Crooked Creek, a tributary of Bayou Meto, winds past Humnoke to its west and south.

According to the United States Census Bureau, Humnoke has a total area of 0.31 square miles (0.81 km^{2}), all land.

== Demographics ==
Historical population
Census	Pop.	Note	%±
1950	263		—
1960	319		21.3%
1970	398		24.8%
1980	442		11.1%
1990	311		−29.6%
2000	280		−10.0%
2010	284		1.4%
2020	219		−22.9%
2025 (est.)	220	▲	0.5%
U.S. Decennial Census

As of the census of 2000, there were 280 people, 111 households, and 77 families residing in the city. The population density was 826.4 inhabitants per square mile (319.1/km^{2}). There were 130 housing units at an average density of 383.7 per square mile (148.1/km^{2}). The racial makeup of the city was 85.71% White, 10.36% Black or African American, 0.36% Asian, 1.79% from other races, and 1.79% from two or more races. 2.86% of the population were Hispanic or Latino of any race.

There were 111 households, out of which 36.0% had children under the age of 18 living with them, 54.1% were married couples living together, 9.9% had a female householder with no husband present, and 30.6% were non-families. 27.0% of all households were made up of individuals, and 14.4% had someone living alone who was 65 years of age or older. The average household size was 2.52 and the average family size was 3.10.

In the city, the population was spread out, with 28.2% under the age of 18, 6.1% from 18 to 24, 32.1% from 25 to 44, 20.0% from 45 to 64, and 13.6% who were 65 years of age or older. The median age was 33 years. For every 100 females, there were 93.1 males. For every 100 females age 18 and over, there were 95.1 males.

The median income for a household in the city was $21,528, and the median income for a family was $28,125. Males had a median income of $27,500 versus $15,750 for females. The per capita income for the city was $15,194. About 15.2% of families and 20.3% of the population were below the poverty line, including 23.5% of those under the age of 18 and 27.8% of those 65 or over.

== Education ==
Since the consolidation of the Humnoke School District on July 1, 1998, public education for elementary and secondary school students is provided by the Carlisle School District, which leads to graduation from Carlisle High School.
