= KURB =

Coordinates: 34.799°N 92.496°W

- Little Rock, Arkansas; United States
- Broadcast area: Little Rock metropolitan area
- Frequency: 98.5 MHz
- Branding: B-98.5 FM

Programming
- Format: Adult contemporary
- Affiliations: Compass Media Networks; Westwood One

Ownership
- Owner: Cumulus Media; (Radio License Holding CBC, LLC)
- Sister stations: KAAY; KARN-FM; KIPR; KLAL

History
- First air date: July 7, 1972
- Former call signs: KLAZ-FM (1972–1986); KZOU (1986–1988); KZOU-FM (1988–1991); KURB-FM (1991–1995)

Technical information
- Licensing authority: FCC
- Facility ID: 19559
- Class: C0
- ERP: 100,000 watts
- HAAT: 392 meters (1,286 ft)

Links
- Public license information: Public file; LMS
- Webcast: Listen live
- Website: www.b98.com

KURB (98.5 FM, B-98.5) is a commercial radio station in Little Rock, Arkansas. It is owned by Cumulus Media. The radio format is adult contemporary music, switching to Christmas music for much of November and December. The studios and offices are in Little Rock off Chenal Parkway.

KURB has an effective radiated power (ERP) of 100,000 watts, the maximum for non-grandfathered FM stations. The transmitter tower is on Two Towers Road atop Shinall Mountain, near the Chenal Valley neighborhood of Little Rock.

The station's current lineup includes mornings with Kevin Idol and Robyn Cisar; middays with Randy Cain; and afternoon drive time with Becky Rogers. The station features John Tesh with "Intelligence for your Life", Sunday through Friday evenings and the "Best of Tesh" on Saturday mornings. B-98.5 is involvement with charitable organizations, most notably Arkansas Children's Hospital where more than $2.5 million has been raised through annual fundraising efforts. The station won the "Ken Peterson Founder's Award for Station of the Year" in 2008 for its work with ACH.

== History ==
On July 7, 1972, the station signed on with call letters now on a Top 40 station in Hot Springs, Arkansas, KLAZ. It was the FM counterpart to KALO (1250 AM). KLAZ had an "underground" progressive rock format. It switched to Top 40 hits in the late 1970s. KLAZ benefited from the increasing popularity of FM radio as one of the first FMs in the market doing a format normally heard on AM radio in that era.

KLAZ changed call letters to KZOU and became "Zoo 98" in 1986, continuing as a Top 40. It was quite successful and ran the original sister station KAAY (1090 AM) out of the format. "Zoo 98" was also the only station to beat country music powerhouse KSSN (95.7 FM) in the first 10 years of its existence, and mopped the floor with Top 40 competitor KKYK, though it would eventually fall to KKYK after a series of missteps, including letting popular morning man Craig O'Neill leave for KKYK, and an ownership change at KKYK that took the station and its format more seriously. Despite being overtaken by KKYK in 1989, KZOU continued to be a CHR station.

In May 1991, KZOU's owners were trying to exit the radio business and sold the station to GHB Broadcasting. GHB flipped the station to hot adult contemporary as KURB "B-98.5" following a continued decline in ratings and the overall decline of the Top 40 format at the time. In a twist of irony, "B-98.5" would assure KKYK would not be able to gloat over its apparent victory, as the station hired Craig O'Neill back from KKYK and once again beat its former rival, which continued to struggle with its fellow CHR's nationwide.

Around 2000, KURB shifted to mainstream AC. Personalities who have previously worked at KURB include Little Rock radio veteran Craig O'Neill, who left the station in 2000 for a position in local television, anchoring evening newscasts for Little Rock's CBS network affiliate, KTHV. O'Neill was replaced by major market jock Scott Thrower, as well as Jeff Matthews, now with Conway Corp., and long-time local TV host and radio personality Lisa Fischer.
