= KLAL =

Contemporary hit radio station in Wrightsville–Little Rock, Arkansas

Coordinates: 34.610°N 92.237°W

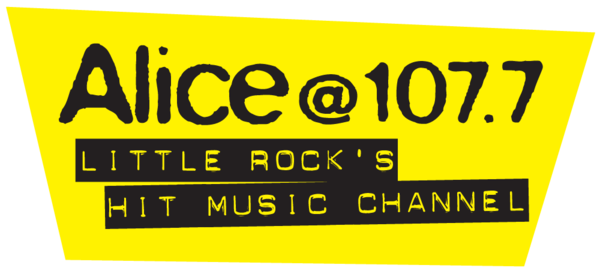
- Wrightsville, Arkansas; United States
- Broadcast area: Little Rock (Central Arkansas)
- Frequency: 107.7 MHz
- Branding: Alice @ 107.7

Programming
- Format: Contemporary hit radio
- Affiliations: Compass Media Networks; Premiere Networks; Westwood One

Ownership
- Owner: Cumulus Media; (Radio License Holding CBC, LLC)
- Sister stations: KAAY; KIPR; KURB; KARN-FM

History
- First air date: March 1992
- Former call signs: KQUG (1991, CP); KYTN (1991–1997)
- Call sign meaning: Little Rock's Alice

Technical information
- Licensing authority: FCC
- Facility ID: 47880
- Class: C1
- ERP: 100,000 watts
- HAAT: 226 meters (741 ft)

Links
- Public license information: Public file; LMS
- Webcast: Listen live
- Website: www.alice1077.com

KLAL (107.7 FM, "Alice @ 107.7") is a contemporary hit radio music formatted radio station in Little Rock, Arkansas (licensed to Wrightsville). The station is owned and operated by Cumulus Media. The station's studios are located in West Little Rock, and the transmitter tower is located in Wrightsville.

== Programming ==
Weekend programming includes Fox All Access Show, MTV Weekend Countdown, Open House Party Saturday and Sunday nights and Dawson McAllister Live.

Longtime local morning show Heather and Poolboy were dismissed in November 2026 as part of nation-wide layoffs by Cumulus.
