= KATV tower =

Former telecommunications tower in Arkansas, United States

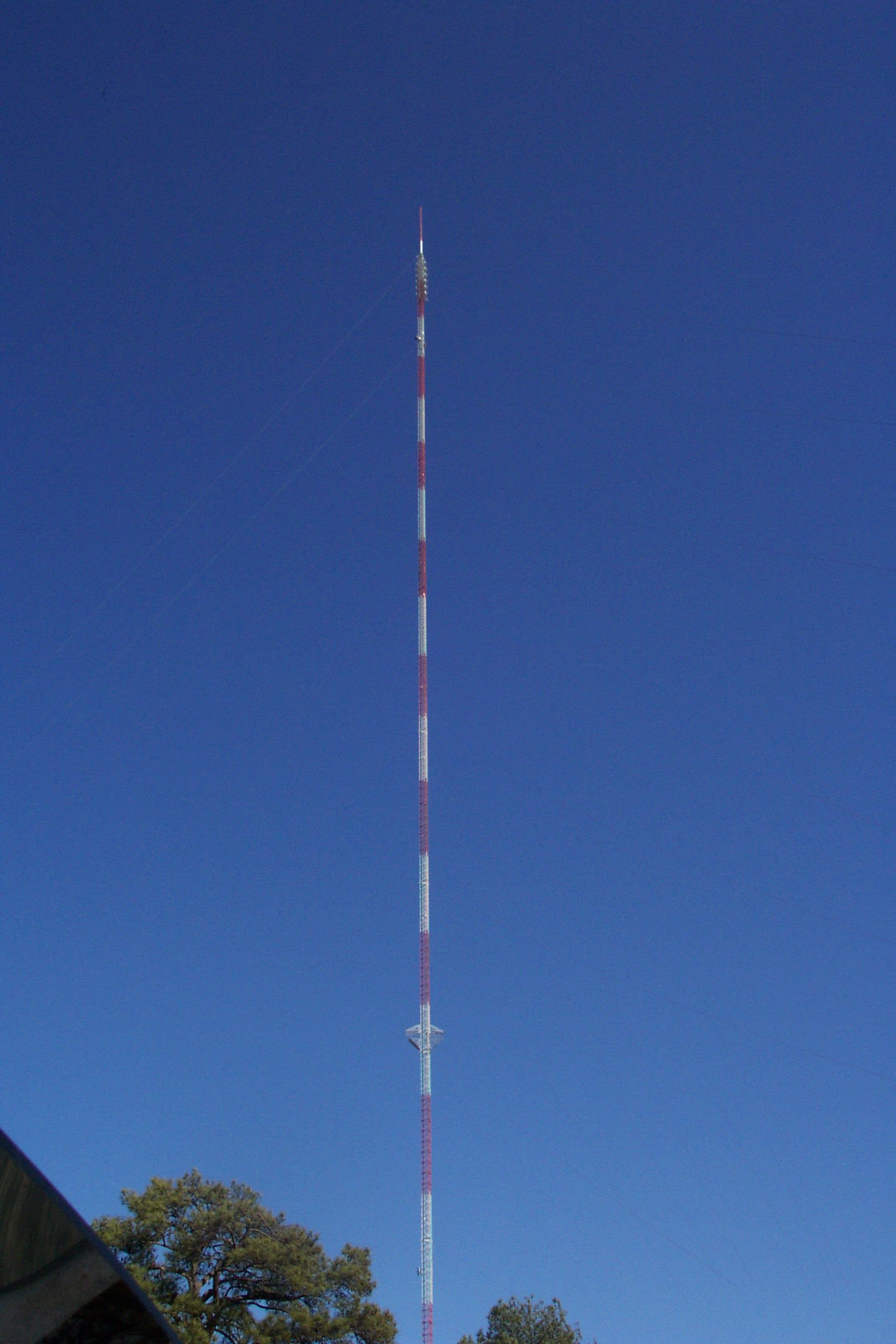
- KATV tower in 2002

- Location within Arkansas

General information
- Status: Destroyed
- Type: Tower
- Architectural style: Guyed
- Location: Barraque Township, Arkansas, United States
- Coordinates: 34°28′24.0″N 92°12′11.0″W
- Completed: August 1965
- Opened: September 12, 1965
- Destroyed: January 22, 2008
- Client: KATV; KETS
- Owner: KATV, LLC

Height
- Height: 2,000 feet (610 m)

Technical details
- Material: Steel mast

Design and construction
- Architecture firm: Dresser Industries, Inc.
- Designations: Was tallest structure in Arkansas until its collapse

The KATV tower was an American 2,000-foot (610 m)-tall television mast (or antenna tower) built in 1965, which was located in Barraque Township, Arkansas, off of Arkansas Highway 365 (at 34°28′24.0″N 92°12′11.0″W). At the time of its completion, it was the third-tallest human-made structure and second-tallest broadcast tower in the world (behind the 2,063-foot [629 m] KVLY-TV mast in Blanchard, North Dakota), and the tallest structure in Arkansas. As of August 2006, the tower was tied with 15 other 2000-foot masts, all built after it, as the fifth-tallest structure in the world (sixth, counting the submerged Petronius oil platform).

In addition to the analog and digital transmitters of its namesake, Little Rock ABC affiliate KATV (channel 7), it also hosted the analog transmitter of KETS (channel 2), the Little Rock flagship station of Arkansas PBS.

== History ==
In June 1964, KATV Inc. received approval from the Federal Communications Commission (FCC) to build a broadcast tower at a site two miles (3.2 km) west-southwest of Redfield. The location of the tower was chosen as a compromise between the station and Pine Bluff's city government and chamber of commerce, amid a dispute over an earlier proposal filed with the FCC in 1962 to move KATV's transmitter facilities from its existing 1,010-foot (310 m) tower near Jefferson to a new 1,794-foot (547 m) tower atop Shinall Mountain, near Little Rock's Chenal Valley neighborhood (approximately 50 miles [80 km] northwest of the existing transmitter site), which the FCC denied in January 1964. KATV—which was originally assigned to Pine Bluff, where it began operations in December 1954—had been operating a secondary studio in Little Rock (in addition to its original Pine Bluff studio) since 1955 and changed its city of license to Little Rock in 1958; in proposing to relocate its transmitter to neighboring Pulaski County, Pine Bluff city officials had accused KATV management of not complying with a 1961 agreement with the city that conditioned continued service to Pine Bluff (including maintaining transmitter facilities in Jefferson County, referencing the city in station IDs, and continuing public service efforts in the city).

The tower was activated on September 12, 1965. KATV agreed to lease space on the tower to the Arkansas Educational Television Commission (AETC) for a nominal annual fee to house the transmitter of educational station KETS (channel 2). KETS began transmitting from the tower when it signed on in April 1966, initially transmitting using equipment borrowed from the former Jefferson tower. The tower was considered as a prominent local landmark and served as the approximate halfway marker for travelers driving between Little Rock and Pine Bluff.

=== Collapse ===
On January 11, 2008, at 12:46 p.m. Central Time (1846 UTC), the tower collapsed. Although the exact cause of the collapse remains unknown, at the time, in an effort to improve its structural condition, engineering crews with McLean, Virginia-based Structural Systems Technology, Inc. (SST) were replacing older guy wire cables on the eighth and ninth levels of the tower. Engineers with the firm claimed that as they were loosening one of the large cables that kept the structure in place on the ninth level, the tower suddenly began to shake and then collapsed; the structure broke into three segments as it came crashing down, which was what it was designed to do. No serious injuries occurred, although a maintenance worker on-scene sustained minor injuries.

The collapse destroyed the analog transmitters of KATV and KETS, and the digital transmitter of KATV. Both stations remained available on Comcast's Little Rock-area systems and, in the case of KETS, Conway Corporation's cable system via direct feeds from their respective studio facilities. Comcast relayed the direct feed of KATV's high definition signal, which was initially interrupted, to other Central Arkansas cable systems, DirecTV and Dish Network, which had lost access to the station's off-air signal; some area cable providers that received the KETS analog feed were able to switch to its digital signal, although some smaller cable systems within its viewing area lost access to PBS programming from the Arkansas Educational Television Network (AETN) completely until KETS resumed analog broadcasts. KATV subsequently restored broadcast service later that week with the assistance of Little Rock-based Equity Media Holdings, which agreed to relay its digital signal on the third subchannel of MyNetworkTV affiliate KWBF-TV (channel 42, now KARZ-TV). KATV restored its analog signal on January 21 from an auxiliary tower on Shinall Mountain, which CBS affiliate KTHV (channel 11) loaned to KATV to set up a temporary analog transmitter. Despite the logistical and economical difficulties of restoring analog broadcasts with about one year until the original digital television transition deadline, on January 14, the AETC announced it would set up temporary analog facilities for KETS on an auxiliary antenna of the adjacent 900-foot (270 m) Clear Channel Broadcasting Tower, where the station's digital signal transmitted since it signed on in 2004; KETS resumed analog broadcasts on the Clear Channel tower—which also housed the analog and digital transmitters of Pine Bluff-licensed CW affiliate KASN (channel 38)—on June 13.

KATV chose not to rebuild at Redfield and instead built a new 1,250-foot (380 m) tower on Shinall Mountain (at 34°47′49.3″N 92°29′20.1″W), where the majority of Little Rock's other major-network affiliates (including KTHV, KARZ, KARK-TV and KLRT-TV) were already located, along with KATV's temporary analog transmitter (on KTHV's backup tower) and digital signal (via the KARZ subchannel). Though the Shinall Mountain tower—which was completed in February 2009—is shorter (as KATV management suggested that tower heights comparable to the former KATV mast were thought to be obsolete, even though communications towers at or above that height had been constructed over the previous decade), the mountain's higher elevation raises KATV's antenna to a similar overall height.

On December 22, 2008, then-Arkansas Attorney General Dustin McDaniel (filing on behalf of KATV and AETN) and the tower's insurer, Boston-based OneBeacon America Insurance Co.—which paid KATV and then-owner Allbritton Communications $4 million in liabilities for the tower damage—each filed lawsuits against Structural Systems Technology with the U.S. District Court for the Eastern District of Arkansas for unspecified damages and litigation costs. The suit alleged multiple complaints of negligence, breach of contract and fraud, stating that SST failed to provide oversight of its engineers and safely supervise its workers during the guy cable replacement.

== See also ==
- List of tallest structures
