= Redfield Tower =

Telecommunications tower in Arkansas, United States

- Location within Arkansas

General information
- Status: Completed
- Type: Telecommunications tower
- Location: Grant County, Arkansas, United States
- Coordinates: 34°26′31″N 92°13′4″W
- Named for: Redfield, Arkansas
- Completed: 1985
- Client: KASN, KETS
- Owner: Mission Broadcasting, Inc.

Height
- Architectural: 1,899-foot (579 m)

The Redfield Tower is a telecommunications tower in Grant County, Arkansas, built in 1985. It is named for the nearby city of Redfield, located in Jefferson County, Arkansas, which is about two miles east of the tower.

== Broadcasting ==
Clear Channel Communications acquired the tower when it acquired KASN (KASN and the rest of Clear Channel's television holdings were divested to Newport Television; KASN is now owned by Mission Broadcasting, Inc. and is managed by Nexstar Media Group). In addition to the digital and former analog transmitters of KASN, the structure also hosts the digital transmitter of KETS.

== See also ==
- List of tallest structures
- Shinall Mountain, transmitter site of KASN's sister stations KLRT-TV, KARK-TV & KARZ-TV plus other Little Rock TV stations
