= B. J. Sams =

B.J. Sams may refer to:

- B. J. Sams (American football) (born 1980), American football player
- B. J. Sams (television) (1935–2026), American news anchor in Little Rock, Arkansas
