= Arkansas TV =

PBS member network in Arkansas, United States

- Statewide Arkansas (Note: Additional coverage in portions of eastern Oklahoma, southern Missouri, western Tennessee and Mississippi, and northern Texas and Louisiana.); United States
- Branding: Arkansas TV

Programming
- Subchannels: see § Subchannels
- Affiliations: PBS

Ownership
- Owner: Arkansas Educational Television Commission

History
- Founded: December 4, 1961
- First air date: December 4, 1966
- Former names: Arkansas Educational Television Network (1966–2020); Arkansas PBS (2020–2025)
- Former affiliations: NET (1966–1970)

Links
- Website: www.arkansastv.gov
- For technical information, see § Stations.

Arkansas TV (formerly Arkansas PBS) is a state network of PBS member television stations serving the U.S. state of Arkansas. It is operated by the Arkansas Educational Television Commission (AETN), a statutory non-cabinet agency of the Arkansas government operated through the Arkansas Department of Elementary and Secondary Education, which holds the licenses for all of the public television stations based in the state. The commission is managed by an independent board of university and education officials, and gubernatorial appointees representing each of Arkansas's four congressional districts. Along with offering television programs supplied by PBS and various independent distributors, the network produces public affairs, cultural and documentary programming as well as sports events sanctioned by the Arkansas Activities Association (AAA).

The broadcast signals of the six full-power and five low-power translator stations that make up the Arkansas TV network cover almost the entire state, as well as portions of the neighboring states of Mississippi, Tennessee, Missouri, Oklahoma, Texas, and Louisiana that have overlapping access to PBS programming through locally based public television stations; its programming is distributed via a thirteen-site microwave interconnection relay system around the state, which covers most of Arkansas, as well as parts of surrounding states.

Arkansas TV also provides online education programs for classroom use and teacher professional development through ArkansasIDEAS (in collaboration with the Arkansas Department of Education), livestreams of state government and board proceedings and other government activities through the Arkansas Citizens Access Network (AR-CAN), and audio reading services for the blind and visually impaired through the Arkansas Information Reading Service for the Blind (AIRS); it also maintains the state's Warning, Alert and Response Network (WARN) infrastructure to disseminate emergency alerts to Arkansas residents. The main offices, production facilities and network operations of Arkansas TV are based out of the R. Lee Reaves Center for Educational Telecommunications, located adjacent to the University of Central Arkansas on South Donaghey Avenue in Conway.

On December 11, 2025, after a loss of federal grant funding, AETN voted to drop its PBS membership effective July 1, 2026, and become an educational independent at that time. It rebranded under the new name Arkansas TV the next day. In June 2026, it was announced the network would retain its PBS membership.

== History ==
=== Incorporation and development ===
Arkansas TV traces its history to June 4, 1954, when the Arkansas Educational Television Association (AETA) was created as a voluntary committee representing 90 organizations lobbying the Arkansas General Assembly to fund and develop a non-commercial educational television service and to file applications with the Federal Communications Commission (FCC) to reserve broadcast television frequencies in selected cities throughout Arkansas for non-commercial use. Following a two-year legislative study to assess the need for educational television programming in Arkansas, on March 8, 1961, the Arkansas General Assembly approved Act of Arkansas, Acts 1961, No. 198 (as amended under Arkansas Code § 6-3-101 to 6-3-113), which created the Arkansas Educational Television Commission as an independent statutory corporation and aimed to develop a statewide public television service that would "provide instructional, educational television for schools and the general public […] and to help with the preservation of the public peace, health and safety." The legislative language indicated that such a service was necessitated to help prevent the spread of communism in the state, as "counter-measures to such subversive influences [were] necessary to the continued existence of constitutional democracy." The bill—signed by Governor Orval Faubus—tasked the commission with providing educational television programming to Arkansans on a coordinated statewide basis, with the cooperation of the state's educational, government and cultural agencies, and allocated funding for the planning and operation of an educational station to serve Little Rock and other areas of Central Arkansas.

Longtime State Senator R. Lee Reaves (D–Warren) was appointed to serve as founding executive director of the Arkansas Educational Television Commission, Arkansas State Teachers College president Dr. Silas Snow was appointed as the commission's chairman, and Fred Schmutz was appointed as program director. The commission board was to have eight members appointed by the governor for a seven-year term, including two members from the state education system (one of whom must be a public education official, and one of whom employed with an Arkansas college or university), representing each of the state's congressional districts. The process of bringing public television to Arkansas began on May 22, 1963, when the AETC applied for a construction permit to build an educational television station on VHF channel 2 in Little Rock; the FCC granted the channel 2 permit to the commission on July 28, 1965. Subsequently, on September 23, 1963, Donrey Media donated the construction permit for defunct NBC affiliate KFOY-TV (channel 9) in Hot Springs to the AETC for $150,000, funded in part through a $100,000 gift from the Donald W. Reynolds Foundation. The permit was not used, but the channel 9 allocation was relocated to Arkadelphia and designated for noncommercial use in 1965.

KETS in Little Rock was finally able to sign on the air over channel 2 on December 4, 1966; it was the first educational television station to sign on in Arkansas, and the nation's 124th non-commercial educational television station to sign on. (The station operated under special temporary authority until the FCC granted the AETC a permanent license for KETS on June 22, 1967.) Channel 2 operated from studio facilities located at the Arkansas State Teachers College (now the University of Central Arkansas) in Conway, which leased the land near the campus on which the broadcast facilities were built; construction funds were appropriated to the commission through the Arkansas General Assembly and by a grant from local public utility provider Conway Corporation. (The building, which was dedicated to Reaves on December 5, 1981, underwent expansions in 1994, to provide expanded storage, tape library and office space, and in 2001, to provide expanded studio space and digital services.) KETS's transmitter and broadcast antenna were located two miles (3.2 km) west-southwest of Redfield, per an agreement with ABC affiliate KATV (channel 7), which leased use of its 2,000-foot (610 m) transmission tower and former transmitter to the AETC for a nominal annual fee.

For its first four years of operation, KETS carried programming from PBS forerunner National Educational Television (NET). Despite color television broadcasts becoming the norm, KETS had initially broadcast its programming exclusively in black-and-white. The station maintained limited hours of operation, exclusively airing Monday through Friday, during its early years; its initial programming, through a cooperative agreement with the Arkansas Department of Education, was focused primarily on instructional telecourse lectures and course subjects for use in Arkansas schools and attributable for college credit during the morning and afternoon from August through May; NET programming also aired during the late afternoon and early evening year-round. On October 5, 1970, KETS—like the full-power repeaters it would sign on in later years—became a member station of the Public Broadcasting Service (PBS), which was founded the previous year as an independent entity to supersede and assume many of the functions of the predecessor NET network. In 1972, the station upgraded its equipment to become capable of broadcasting programs in color. From KETS's sign-on through the 1980s, the network acted as an educational resource for public school and college educators through the use of instructional videos with teacher guides and supplements for grade school classrooms, college telecourses and GED education for adults.

=== Expansion into a statewide network ===
After six years of serving only Central Arkansas through KETS, in early 1972, the Arkansas Educational Television Commission commenced plans to construct a network of additional transmitters connected by a microwave relay system. On September 15, the AETC filed applications to build four satellite stations and one translator to expand KETS's educational programming to approximately three-quarters of the state, to serve Arkadelphia on VHF channel 9 (filed on July 15, 1974, and granted on February 28, 1975), Fayetteville on VHF channel 13 (filed on March 8, 1974, and granted on July 10, 1975), Jonesboro on UHF channel 19 (granted on July 8, 1974), and Mountain View on VHF channel 6 (re-filed on April 22, 1977, and granted on March 15, 1979). In 1973, the Arkansas General Assembly approved the plan and associated funding to expand educational television programming to the entire state through KETS.

The four satellites that joined KETS to form the Arkansas Educational Television Network (AETN) were launched between 1976 and 1980; the three initial repeaters among KETS's four original satellite stations launched over the span of five months starting in the Fall of 1976. KETG (channel 9) in Arkadelphia was the first to sign on the air on October 29, 1976, providing public television service to southwestern Arkansas from a transmitter near Gurdon; less than two months later, on December 9, KAFT (channel 13) in Fayetteville—transmitting from atop Sunset Mountain (near Winslow)—debuted as the network's third station, servicing most of Northwest Arkansas including nearby Fort Smith. (Around that time, the AETC also launched a low-power translator station, K13MV, in Eudora, servicing portions of far southeastern Arkansas.) The AETC launched its fourth full-power station on January 13, 1977, when KTEJ (channel 19) in Jonesboro signed on from a transmitter in Bono, extending its reach into portions of northeastern Arkansas as well as adjacent border areas of western Tennessee and the Missouri Bootheel. By 1979, AETN expanded its broadcast schedule to offer additional programming for general audiences during the evenings and on weekends, broadcasting daily from 7 a.m. to 11 p.m. The last of the original satellites to debut was KEMV (channel 6) in Mountain View, which signed on June 21, 1980, to provide service to north-central Arkansas as well as parts of extreme south-central Missouri from a transmitter located just east of Fox.

Former logo as the Arkansas Educational Television Network, used from 1984 to 2007, and a slanted version from 2007 to 2020.

Raymond Ho replaced the retiring Reaves as executive director in June 1981; his tenure saw AETN increase production of local programming, and Ho and the network become embroiled in political conflicts with state legislators. In addition to lobbying state officials for additional legislative funding, Ho significantly expanded fundraising for the network through public and private donations. (The "Festival 84" spring pledge drive, for example, raised $519,000, an increase of 162 percent over the $198,000 raised in the previous year's "Festival" event.) To aid these efforts, in 1984, the AETN Foundation (now the Arkansas PBS Foundation) was established as an independent endowment trust for the network's public and private fundraising efforts, soliciting and receiving permanent endowment donations to help support the network and commission's operations; it is presided by the eight AETC commissioners and seven at-large elected lay members. The AETN Foundation superseded Friends of AETN (founded in 1976) as its funding trust, restructuring that organization as a volunteer and public relations support entity. AETN also became an early adopter of the fledgling second audio program standard in October 1984, when it entered into a partnership with the Arkansas Division of Services for the Blind to transmit the Arkansas Information Reading Services for the Blind (AIRS) radio reading service on its main SAP subcarrier; the AIRS service provides audio transcriptions of local and national newspapers, magazines and books for blind and visually impaired Arkansans. (The AIRS feed was later made available on the network's DT4 subchannel when AETN began digital broadcasts in April 2004.)

Among the programs that Ho developed at AETN was the weekly state news and affairs show Arkansas Week, modeled as a local version of PBS's Washington Week in Review. In 1986, the program received criticism from lawmakers and threats of legislative action by the Assembly's Review and Advise Subcommittee of the Legislative Council against AETN because of two recurring panelists, Arkansas Democrat political reporters John Robert Starr and Meredith Oakley, for their criticism of public officials. State Sen. Knox Nelson (D–Pine Bluff) opined that AETN was to focus on educational content and not politics and expressed concern that it was "becoming a propaganda system that would be used to promote political philosophies." In a memo to the Assembly, Ho responded that Arkansas Week was structured to feature general discussion on the week's state news and would not be a forum for personal attacks on lawmakers or other individuals. Ho resigned in August 1986 to become executive director of Maryland Public Television.

In October 1992, Ralph Forbes, a former American Nazi Party member and self-described "Christian supremacist" who ran as an independent U.S. House candidate for the state's 3rd congressional district in that year's elections, filed a lawsuit against the AETC in the U.S. District Court for the Eastern District of Arkansas, after he was denied a request to appear in an AETN-sponsored Congressional debate after qualifying to appear on the ballot, claiming he was entitled to participate under the First Amendment and federal equal time rules. After ruling in favor of the AETC, Forbes filed an appeal to the U.S. Court of Appeals for the Eighth Circuit, which reversed the lower court's decision in September 1996, ruling that AETN (as the debate's sponsor) created a limited public forum from which all qualifying candidates had a presumptive right of access and could not be excluded (even based on viability grounds as AETN officials determined) unless for a particularly exceptionary reason. Concerned that the Eighth Circuit's ruling could result in fewer political and controversial social issue-based debates and diminished political coverage by public broadcasters, the AETC appealed to the U.S. Supreme Court; on May 18, 1998, the Supreme Court ruled in favor of the AETC, 6–3, in Arkansas Educational Television Commission v. Ralph P. Forbes, affirming that government-run stations do not run afoul of the First Amendment in exercising "viewpoint-neutral […] journalistic discretion," that state-owned public broadcasters were not required to invite all ballot-qualified third-party or fringe candidates to participate in their debates, and that state employees can exclude candidates outside the two major parties without violating their free speech rights.

The network began maintaining a 24-hour daily schedule in 1994, when it added a tertiary feed of instructional programming during the overnight hours; daytime instructional programs were replaced with an expanded schedule of PBS children's programming as a result. By this time, AETN had begun providing distance learning via broadcast, satellite, the Internet and, by 2003, compressed video to provide educational professional development as well as access for students to a wide variety of educational courses for classroom use. In April 2001, AETN began installation of a digital satellite distribution network to replace its interconnected microwave distribution system, in an effort to modernize transmission relays between KETS and its four full-power satellite stations.

Much of south-central and southeastern Arkansas remained underserved by AETN, receiving only fringe reception from nearby transmitters or defaulting to receiving the network on cable and satellite, though national PBS programming was often available from Louisiana Public Broadcasting satellite KLTM-TV in Monroe. AETN would finally gain broadcast coverage in that region on May 17, 2006, when AETN launched KETZ (channel 12) in El Dorado as its sixth and final full-power satellite, operating from a transmitter in Huttig and broadcasting exclusively as a digital service from its launch. The addition of KETZ provided the network over-the-air coverage to about 76% of available Arkansas television households. (The five analog transmitters eventually converted to digital by June 2009, joining KETZ, as part of the national digital transition.) On September 6, 2006, AETN, in conjunction with the Arkansas Department of Education and PBS TeacherLine, launched ArkansasIDEAS ("Internet Delivered Education for Arkansas Schools"), an online learning management and professional development resource formed through the creation of the Arkansas Online Professional Development Initiative, which provides TeacherLine's instructional courses and workshops to certified educational employees of Arkansas public schools. The service, which is attributable to the state's professional development requirement for educators, is wholly funded by the ADE and is provided free of charge to state school districts.

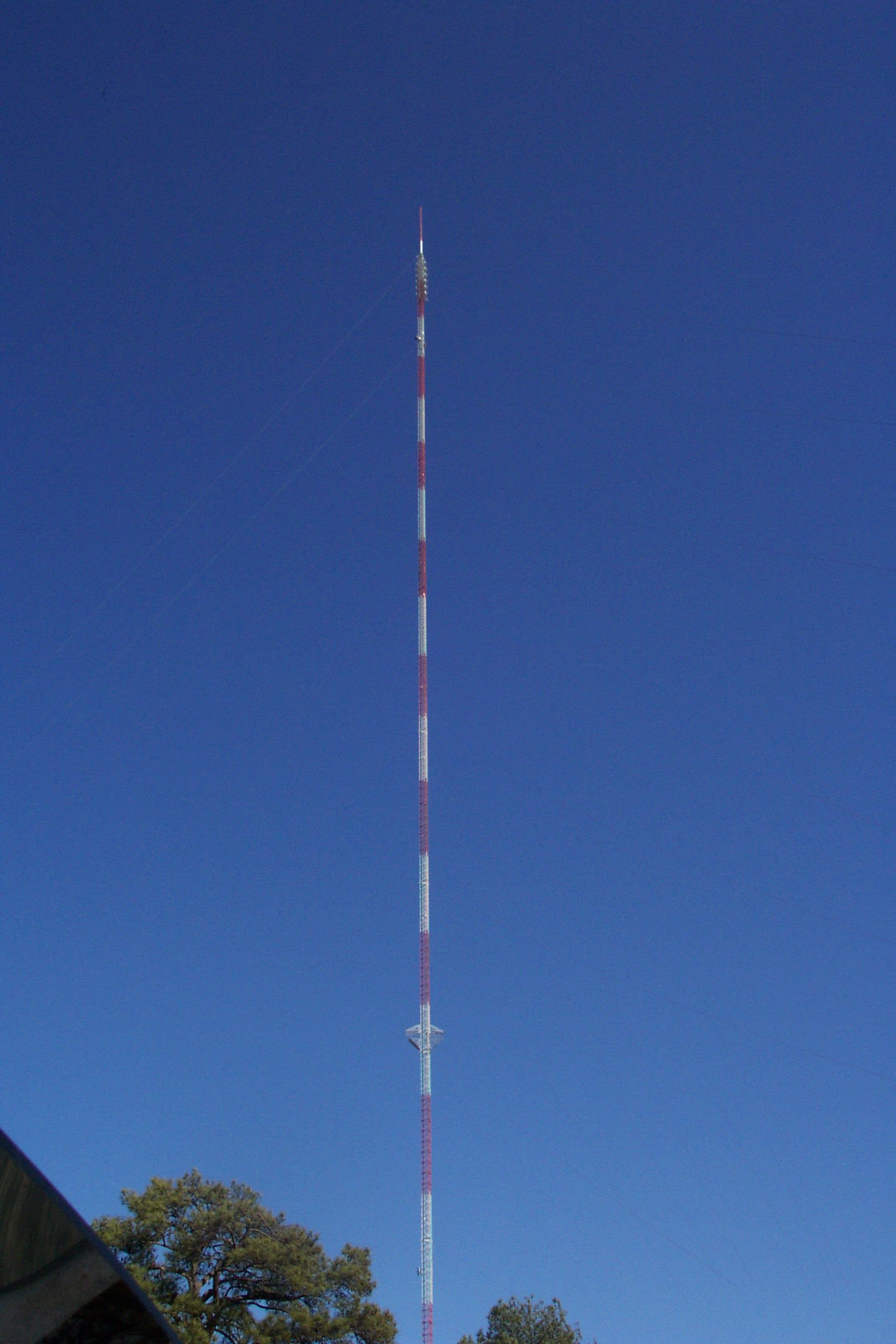
The KETS analog tower in Redfield, before the collapse.

On January 11, 2008, KETS's analog transmitter was destroyed when the Redfield broadcast tower collapsed while engineers were adjusting the guy wires supporting the structure. Unlike KATV, which had both its analog and digital transmitters destroyed in the collapse and had to set up replacements for both services, the KETS's digital signal was unaffected as its transmitter was located on the adjacent Clear Channel Broadcasting Tower, on which it shares tower space with the transmitter of Pine Bluff CW affiliate KASN (channel 38). Many Central Arkansas cable and satellite providers were able to switch to the KETS digital signal, while smaller cable systems in the area either lost access to AETN completely for the outage's duration or switched to AETN's digital feed in subsequent days. Despite the logistical and economical issues of replacing an analog transmitter mere months before the original analog-to-digital transition deadline, on January 14, AETN elected to restore KETS's analog signal via a temporary transmitter installed on an auxiliary antenna on the 900-foot (270 m) Clear Channel tower. KETS resumed analog broadcasts from the new transmitter on June 13, 2008; as the temporary analog service operated at reduced power, some residents in low-lying areas of Central Arkansas had difficulty receiving KETS over-the-air upon the signal's restoration.

In April 2011, AETN upgraded its master control and production control facilities with expanded digital and high definition equipment, allowing the network to transmit timeshifted programming, and most promotional and interstitial material shown during station breaks between programs (including most programming promotions supplied by PBS, and short-form content produced by AETN or through outside suppliers) in high definition. That year, the network began producing most of its locally produced productions in high definition; programs produced at the Conway studios later began broadcasting from a new HD-capable production studio in 2013. On February 5, 2019, AETN launched the Arkansas Citizens Access Network (AR-CAN), a streaming service available on the network's website that offers live and archived coverage of Arkansas General Assembly, state board and commission meetings; government hearings; press conferences; and official state events. All events are available for viewing for 30 days after their occurrence.

Former "Arkansas PBS" logo.

On February 14, 2020, AETN announced that it would rebrand as "Arkansas PBS", a change designed to harmonize with the brand refresh of PBS carried out the year before; the name change—adopted across its broadcast and digital platforms as well as the AETN Foundation (renamed the Arkansas PBS Foundation)—took effect on February 28.

In March 2020, as a result of its role in delivering instructional television programming, Arkansas PBS was awarded $6.4 million in state CARES Act funds to build five new low-power translators to fill gaps in the network's statewide coverage and provide over-the-air access to PBS programming to part or all of 31 Arkansas counties that previously received weak or no signal coverage from the six main transmitters (which would extend the network's broadcast reach to an additional 23.5% of the state's population). K11JW-D, on Lee Mountain serving Russellville, became the first of the five repeater transmitters to be activated on June 1, 2021.

=== Canceled disaffiliation from PBS ===
In 2025, due to cuts to public broadcasting implemented by the second Trump administration under the Rescissions Act of 2025, Arkansas PBS lost $2.5 million in funding from the Corporation for Public Broadcasting (CPB). This grant funding covered roughly half of the network's operational and programming costs (including PBS membership dues). In June 2025, the Arkansas PBS Foundation board voted to renew its membership in PBS for fiscal year 2026 (starting July 2025), amid calls to potentially drop the network as a cost-savings measure. The foundation used a $1.5 million emergency fund to help cover its operations for fiscal year 2026.

On December 11, 2025, the AETN board voted to disaffiliate from PBS on July 1, 2026 (start of fiscal year 2027). CFO James Downs stated that Arkansas PBS' continued participation in the network was not viable in the long term without federal funding, arguing that "we just do not see a way that our network and our foundation can continue at that rate, to continue to incur more than $2 million every year, continuing on into a deficit in PBS membership dues while also providing the financial support we also need to remain operational". The next day, the network subsequently rebranded as Arkansas TV in anticipation of the switch, stating that the new name was a reflection that "visual storytelling — centered on the people, places and experiences of our state — remains at the core of everything we do".

On March 12, 2026, it was reported that the Arkansas Television Commission voted to pause plans to disaffiliate from PBS, following a swarm of public feedback wanting the state to keep the partnership. This was delayed for 180 days, allowing the network more time to find funding.

On June 3, 2026, it was announced that the Arkansas TV Foundation secured enough funding to keep the PBS affiliation for at least three more years.

== Programming ==
Original local programming produced by Arkansas TV includes the Arkansas Week (a state political affairs program, moderated by veteran Little Rock television journalist Steve Barnes, which is based on the format of Washington Week and debuted in 1983), Exploring Arkansas (a weekly state cultural and tourism series hosted by Chuck Dovish, who previously hosted a similar series of feature segments for Little Rock CBS affiliate KTHV [channel 11], which debuted in 2005), Arkansans Ask (a quarterly topical call-in program underwritten by the Arkansas State Employees Association), Blueberry’s Clubhouse (a children's program produced in partnership with the Arkansas Museum of Fine Arts teaching subjects of art, science, history and social development, which debuted as a summer series in 2019), and the Arkansas Governor's Quiz Bowl (an Arkansas Activities Association–sanctioned annual scholarship quiz bowl event for Arkansas high school students that debuted in 1985). Two of Arkansas TV's original programs have also been distributed for public television syndication: the monthly outdoor sports program Arkansas Outdoors (which debuted on the network in 1991) was syndicated to Outdoor Life Network/Versus in the U.S. and to selected international broadcasters from 1998 to 2006, and the health and financial wellness program Aging Successfully with Dr. David (which was hosted by Dr. David Lipschitz and debuted in 1999 through a production partnership with the University of Arkansas for Medical Sciences), was distributed to selected PBS stations from 2000 to 2006.

Through its membership with PBS, much of the state network's programming consists of educational and entertainment programming that the service distributes to its member stations, including the PBS NewsHour, Nova, Frontline, Masterpiece, Nature and Antiques Roadshow. It also carries programs distributed by American Public Television and other sources to fill its schedule. As is typical of PBS member outlets, Arkansas PBS's daytime lineup is primarily centered on PBS Kids children's programs (such as Sesame Street, Wild Kratts, Daniel Tiger's Neighborhood and Arthur), airing weekdays from 6 a.m. to 2:30 p.m. and Sundays from 5 to 9 a.m. Weekdays also feature a rotating block of PBS prime time shows and selected original programs in the late afternoon (which replaced a portion of the station's PBS Kids schedule in September 2021), and a block of international news programs—consisting of the PBS NewsHour, BBC World News's late-evening public television broadcast and World News America, and Amanpour and Company—in the early and late access periods. Programs provided by PBS are primarily shown on most nights in prime time, except on Saturdays, with various British drama series being showcased on that night. Weekends feature a broad mix of how-to programs throughout the daytime hours on Saturdays, and late-morning public affairs programs and afternoon encores of PBS prime time shows on Sundays. In August 2018, AETN entered into a partnership with the Arkansas Activities Association to broadcast AAA-sanctioned high school football and basketball tournament and championship events for school classifications 1A–7A, effective with that year's high school football state finals.

Although it generally carries nearly all programming distributed by PBS, Arkansas PBS has occasionally declined carriage of certain episodes of NET/PBS shows due to content that management or viewers deemed unsuitable for local broadcast, or edited portions of programs for perceived inappropriate content. Programs that have been refused carriage have included NET's February 1967 presentations of the stage adaptation of An Enemy of the People (following complaints from a group of 10 Mena-based ministers over profanity featured in the play) and Ten Blocks on the Camino Real (which program director Fred Schmutz called "profane and lewd"; he also remarked that he "could no more air it than [he] could fly"); VD Blues, an October 1972 special (also declined by Mississippi Educational Television) that featured dramatic sketches illustrating the struggles of venereal disease, and Tongues Untied, a 1991 documentary on homosexuality in the Black community (due to suggestive language).

The preemption decisions under the direction of Schmutz and executive director Lee Reaves, specifically following Schmutz's statement that AETN would not air the 1978 documentary As We See It... (which AETN would air in February 1980) if its representation of the events of the Little Rock Central High School integration crisis was biased in a way that would be "embarrassing to Arkansas," led to an investigation by the Arkansas Library Association into AETN's programming practices, which were found to be "fuzzy and vague"; in June 1981, the AETC rejected a motion to give AETN staff and advisory board members broader discretion over content issues, leaving such matters to be made by the network's executive director and program director. In May 2019, the network declined to air the Arthur episode "Mr. Ratburn and the Special Someone" on its main channel upon its initial broadcast (substituting it with a rerun from 2014) due to the episode depicting a same-sex marriage involving the Ratburn character, a move that (along with Alabama Public Television's earlier decision to preempt the episode) drew criticism from some LGBT advocacy groups, viewers and state legislators; AETN decided to air the episode over its PBS Kids subchannel later that month.

== Stations ==
=== Full-power stations ===
Arkansas TV primarily comprises six full-power digital transmitters:

Station	City of license	Channel; TV (RF)	Facility ID	ERP	HAAT	Transmitter coordinates	First air date	Public license information
KAFT	Fayetteville	13 (9)	2767	37.9 kW	503 m (1,650 ft)	35°48′53″N 94°1′42″W	September 18, 1976	Public file; LMS
KEMV	Mountain View	6 (13)	2777	12.1 kW	426 m (1,398 ft)	35°48′47″N 92°17′25″W	November 16, 1980	Public file; LMS
KETG	Arkadelphia	9 (13)	2768	13.85 kW	314 m (1,030 ft)	33°54′26″N 93°6′47″W	October 2, 1976	Public file; LMS
KETS	Little Rock	2 (7)	2770	26.73 kW	547 m (1,795 ft)	34°26′31″N 92°13′4″W	December 4, 1966	Public file; LMS
KETZ	El Dorado	12 (10)	92872	16.2 kW	538 m (1,765 ft)	33°4′41.6″N 92°13′30.9″W	May 20, 2006	Public file; LMS
KTEJ	Jonesboro	19 (20)	2769	322.9 kW	310 m (1,017 ft)	35°54′14″N 90°46′14″W	May 1, 1976	Public file; LMS

=== Translators ===
Arkansas PBS satellites and translators (blue markers indicate translators not currently on-the-air)

Arkansas TV is also rebroadcast on the following translator stations:

- Yancy–Texarkana: K08HQ-D (KETG)
- Mena: K08KF-D (KAFT)
- Forrest City–West Memphis: K10IR-D (KTEJ)
- Gaither–Harrison: K11JS-D (KAFT)
- Russellville: K11JW-D (KETS)

== Technical information ==
=== Subchannels ===
All Arkansas PBS stations have multiplexed digital signals. The display name for each subchannel corresponds to the call sign of the respective station:

Arkansas PBS multiplex
Subchannel	Res.	Short name	Programming
xx.1	720p	(callsign)-1	PBS
xx.2	720p	(callsign)-2	Create
xx.3	480i	(callsign)-3	PBS Kids
xx.4	480i	(callsign)-4	World Channel; Arkansas Information Reading Service for the Blind (AIRS) on SAP

Arkansas PBS (as AETN) began transmitting digital signals of its five existing full-power stations on June 11, 2004. Initially assigned UHF allocations for all five full-power digital relays, AETN elected to reassign VHF frequencies for the digital channels of KETS and its satellites (except KETJ) to reduce operational expenses; KETS and KEMV operated at reduced power until the transition to prevent analog co-channel interference with KFSM-TV in Fort Smith and adjacent channel interference with WMC-TV in Memphis, respectively. (KETS traded its original UHF 47 allocation with Sheridan-licensed KWBF-LP [channel 5, now defunct], then an analog translator of Little Rock-based KWBF-TV.) The General Assembly and the AETN Foundation (through matching private donations) had collectively appropriated $12 million for the Arkansas Educational Television Commission to install digital transmission equipment for the AETN stations.

=== Analog-to-digital conversion ===
During the six-month period leading up to the official date on which full-power stations in the United States transitioned from analog to digital broadcasts under federal mandate, AETN shut down the analog transmitters of its full-power stations on a staggered basis:

- KETS shut down its analog signal, over VHF channel 2, and suspended digital broadcasts over pre-transition VHF channel 5, on January 25, 2009. KETS's digital signal remained off-the-air until KATV shut down its analog signal on June 12, enabling KETS to resume on VHF channel 7.
- KETZ suspended digital broadcasts over pre-transition VHF channel 12, on February 5, 2009. KETZ remained off-the-air until KTVE shut down its analog signal on June 12, enabling KETZ to resume digital broadcasts on VHF channel 10.
- KTEJ shut down its analog signal, over UHF channel 19, on February 17, 2009, with the digital signal remaining its pre-transition UHF channel 20.

On June 12, 2009:

- KAFT shut down its analog signal, over VHF channel 13, with the digital signal remaining on its pre-transition VHF channel 9.
- KEMV shut down its analog signal, over VHF channel 6, with the digital signal remaining on its pre-transition VHF channel 13.
- KETG shut down its analog signal, over VHF channel 9, with the digital signal remaining on its pre-transition VHF channel 13.

Due to the suspension of KETS and KETZ, cable systems in central, south-central and southeastern Arkansas received AETN programming via a direct fiber connection from its Conway headquarters or used relay antennas to receive the signals of other AETN satellites. DirecTV provided subscribers in the Little Rock and Monroe–El Dorado markets access to the default PBS Satellite Service feed in place of KETS and KETZ.
