= AETN =

AETN may refer to:

- Arkansas TV, a public television network in Arkansas that was formerly known as the Arkansas Educational Television Network
- A&E Television Networks, parent company of A&E Network and History Channel, among others
