= KFOY =

KFOY may refer to:

- KFOY (AM), a radio station (1060 AM) licensed to serve Sparks, Nevada, United States
- KSTP (AM), a radio station (1500 AM) licensed to serve St. Paul, Minnesota, United States, which held the call sign KFOY from 1924 to 1928
- KFOY-TV, a defunct television station (channel 9) licensed to serve Hot Springs, Arkansas, United States (1961-1963)
