= Alice Stewart (commentator) =

American political commentator (1966–2024)

- Born: Alice Elizabeth Stewart; March 11, 1966; Atlanta, Georgia, U.S.
- Died: May 18, 2024 (aged 58); Belle View, Virginia, U.S.
- Education: University of Georgia
- Presenting career
- Network: CNN
- Country: United States

Alice Elizabeth Stewart (March 11, 1966 – May 18, 2024) was an American communications director who worked on five Republican presidential campaigns before joining CNN as a commentator.

== Early life and education ==
Stewart was from Atlanta, Georgia. She graduated from Tucker High School and obtained journalism and political science degrees from the University of Georgia's Grady School of Journalism.

== Career ==
Stewart began her career as a weekend anchor on the NBC Little Rock affiliate KARK television station.

Stewart served as a communications director for the presidential campaign of former Minnesota Representative Michele Bachmann and then former Senator Rick Santorum. She began working for Arkansas governor and politician Mike Huckabee as press secretary for his first presidential campaign. She worked for his second presidential campaign until she resigned in 2015. She was also a communications director for Texas Senator Ted Cruz's 2016 campaign.

Stewart joined CNN in 2016, during the election. In 2019, she became a Harvard Fellow at Harvard Kennedy School at Harvard University. She was an Emmy Award–winning journalist.

== Personal life ==
Stewart was an avid runner. She ran in the New York City Marathon in November 2023 and the Cherry Blossom Ten Mile Run in April 2024. She completed the NYC Marathon in 4:18:48 and the Cherry Blossom Ten Mile Run in 1:31:04.

Stewart was found dead outdoors on May 18, 2024, in Belle View, Virginia. She was 58. No foul play was suspected. The authorities stated that she had a medical emergency.
