= KFOY-TV =

Television station in Hot Springs, Arkansas (1961–1963)

Hot Springs, Arkansas; United States
- Channels: Analog: 9 (VHF)

Programming
- Affiliations: NBC

Ownership
- Owner: Donrey Media; (American Television Co.)

History
- First air date: February 12, 1961
- Last air date: April 17, 1963; (2 years, 64 days)
- Call sign meaning: Fountain of Youth

Technical information
- ERP: 2.63 kW
- HAAT: 122 m (400 ft)
- Transmitter coordinates: 34°30′49″N 93°3′13″W

KFOY-TV (channel 9) was a television station in Hot Springs, Arkansas, United States. Operating from 1961 to 1963, the station was owned by Donald W. Reynolds, founder of Donrey Media Group.

== History ==
Channel 9 was assigned to Hot Springs by the Federal Communications Commission (FCC) in 1952.

Construction was approved for KFOY in April 1960 after a meeting between the Hot Springs City Planning Commission and officers of Southwestern Operating Co. (for Donrey Media). The station was licensed to Donrey's American Television Co. The call letters were for "Fountain of Youth" to tie in with the local hot springs, once believed to have healing properties.

Studios, transmitter, and the 317-foot (97 m) tower were located at 105 Whippoorwill Street on West Mountain in Hot Springs National Park. The station signed on at 1 p.m. CST on February 12, 1961, with a special open house telecast. Regular programming began at 5 p.m. CST.

== Programming ==
KFOY-TV had no network affiliation when it began broadcasting, but later affiliated with NBC. Programming consisted of movies, syndicated shows and local productions. A number of prominent entertainers appeared on the station while working at local night clubs, and fan dancer Sally Rand had an exercise program during her stay in town.

== Staff ==
Air personalities included newscaster Chad Lassiter; and weathercaster Tom Nichols, succeeded by Barbara Ann Stillings.

Harold E. "Hal" King was named general manager in mid-January 1961. Other staff members included Arie Landrum, program director; Bryan T. E. Bisney, production manager; Albert W. Scheer, Jr., chief engineer; C. J. "Gus" Dickson, commercial manager; Joe Wall, camera operator; Valerie Matthews, set designer; Gloria Lee Milton, receptionist; and Lillian B. Robbins, continuity writer and secretary.

Donrey Media transferred Bill Crews from Fort Smith, Arkansas, where Donrey owned KFSA-TV (channel 5), to manage KFOY in 1962.

== Demise ==
The station suffered from an inadequate coverage pattern as well as a declining Hot Springs population and its proximity to Little Rock; one of Donrey's competitors in Fort Smith, radio station KWHN, asked for channel 9 to be moved there to provide better competition. It suspended operations on April 17, 1963, citing $100,000 in debt.

In August 1963, the station and its facilities were sold to the Arkansas Educational Television Commission for $150,000 using a $100,000 gift from the Reynolds Foundation. AETC did not activate a channel 9 facility in the region until KETG, licensed to Arkadelphia and transmitting from Gurdon, began broadcasting on October 2, 1976.

== Bibliography ==
- Poindexter, Ray (1974). Arkansas Airwaves (PDF). North Little Rock, Arkansas – via World Radio History.
