= B. J. Sams (journalist) =

American local television news personality (1935–2026)

Billy Jack Sams (March 19, 1935 – June 25, 2026) was an American news anchor. He presented "Today's THV This Morning", now called "THV 11 News This Morning", the morning news show for KTHV-TV, the local CBS-affiliated television station in Little Rock, Arkansas, which is owned by the Gannett Company. He was in broadcasting for more than 50 years. B.J. Sams co-hosted the program with anchor Alyson Courtney (now morning news anchor at KATV) and meteorologist Tom Brannon. The show has repeatedly ranked number one in the market over the past five years. B.J. Sams came to KTHV after years of anchoring news at KHON-TV in Honolulu, Hawaii where he served as main anchor for several years in the 1970s, after serving from 1964 to 1970 as co-anchor at KATV Channel 7. After returning to Arkansas in 1982, he was first the sole anchor, then co-anchor, of the evening newscast before moving to the morning show. He retired from KTHV and the television business in the summer of 2009. He was inducted into Arkansas Entertainers Hall of Fame in 2007 and the Arkansas Walk of Fame in 2012. Sams also has received other award recognitions throughout and after his career in television broadcasting.

Sams died on June 25, 2026, at the age of 91.
