= KLRT-TV =

Television station in Little Rock, Arkansas

- Little Rock, Arkansas; United States
- Channels: Digital: 30 (UHF); Virtual: 16
- Branding: Fox 16 Arkansas; Fox 16 News

Programming
- Affiliations: 16.1: Fox; for others, see § Subchannels

Ownership
- Owner: Mission Broadcasting
- Operator: Nexstar Media Group
- Sister stations: KASN, KARK-TV, KARZ-TV; Tegna: KTHV

History
- First air date: June 26, 1983
- Former channel numbers: Analog: 16 (UHF, 1983–2009)
- Former affiliations: Independent (1983–1990)
- Call sign meaning: Little Rock Television

Technical information
- Licensing authority: FCC
- Facility ID: 11951
- ERP: 1,000 kW
- HAAT: 449 m (1,473 ft)
- Transmitter coordinates: 34°47′57″N 92°29′30″W

Links
- Public license information: Public file; LMS
- Website: www.fox16.com

KLRT-TV (channel 16) is a television station in Little Rock, Arkansas, United States, affiliated with the Fox network. It is owned by Mission Broadcasting alongside KASN (channel 38) and operated by Nexstar Media Group, owner of KARK-TV (channel 4), KTHV (channel 11), and KARZ-TV (channel 42). KLRT-TV, KASN, KARK-TV and KARZ-TV share studios at the Victory Building on West Capitol Avenue and South Victory Street, near the Arkansas State Capitol, in downtown Little Rock; KLRT-TV's transmitter is located at the Shinall Mountain antenna farm.

KLRT-TV began broadcasting on June 26, 1983, as the first independent station in the market and the first UHF station in central Arkansas in nearly 30 years. It was owned by a consortium dominated by MMT Sales, a national advertising sales representative for TV stations, and featuring six other partners who had been its competing applicants. After briefly becoming a Fox affiliate in September 1989 in connection with a planned acquisition of KASN assets that fell through, the network moved its affiliation for good to KLRT-TV in 1990. The next year, Clear Channel Television acquired KLRT-TV, followed by the assets of KASN, which Clear Channel then began controlling under a local marketing agreement. A local news program debuted in 2004. Clear Channel spun out its television stations to Newport Television, controlled by Providence Equity Partners, in 2007.

In 2012, Nexstar purchased some of the stations of Newport; it then assigned the purchase of KLRT-TV and KASN to Mission Broadcasting, which then contracted with Nexstar for services. As a result, most of KLRT-TV's management and news staffers were dismissed as functions were consolidated with KARK-TV. The combined newsroom airs weekday morning, early evening, and late evening newscasts on channel 16.

== History ==
The first proposal for a channel 16 station in Little Rock reached the construction permit stage with a grant by the Federal Communications Commission (FCC) in March 1966. The station would have been owned by the Victor Broadcasting Company, controlled by Connecticut industrialist Victor Muscat alongside Little Rock radio station KMYO. Originally planned to launch in 1967, its backers opted to wait until the FCC granted them an increase in their effective radiated power. The construction permit remained on the books until being deleted by the start of 1974.

=== As an independent station ===
Interest in building channel 16 was rekindled in the late 1970s by groups seeking different uses. One, Arkansas Christian Television, sought to build a Christian television station; others proposed subscription television programming. The final field of applicants for channel 16 numbered eight. Other notable bidders included Milton Grant's Grant Broadcasting Corporation; a group led by former KARK-TV news anchor Deborah Mathis; Central Arkansas Television, whose investors included former U.S. House Representative and eventual Arkansas Governor Jim Guy Tucker; May Broadcasting of Shenandoah, Iowa; and LRTV Limited Partnership, controlled by national station representation firm MMT Sales of New York and its executive Gary Scollard. Arkansas Christian Television, not wanting to face a comparative hearing process that it believed could stretch on for five years, withdrew the next month.

At the end of 1981, the seven remaining applicants announced a settlement agreement to combine in a limited partnership dominated by MMT. The lopsided nature of the shareholdings prompted the FCC administrative law judge assigned to the comparative hearing case to initially reject the settlement, only to be overruled by the FCC's review board that June, an action that cleared the way for the construction permit to be granted.

Little Rock Communications Associates (LRCA), the consortium of owners produced by the settlement agreement, proceeded to draft plans to construct the station on Shinall Mountain and purchase a building off Markham Street. The call letters KLRT-TV, for Little Rock Television, were assigned over the objections of Little Rock radio station KLRA.

KLRT-TV first signed on the air on June 26, 1983. It was the first independent station in Arkansas; the first commercial television station to sign on in the region since CBS affiliate KTHV (channel 11) debuted 28 years earlier on November 27, 1955; and the first UHF station to operate in Little Rock since pioneering KRTV on channel 17 sold its facilities to KATV in 1954. It aired syndicated classic sitcoms, prime time movies, sports, and children's cartoons.

Two more independents would launch in Central Arkansas to compete with KLRT during 1986. Bell Equities, Inc. signed on KRZB-TV (channel 26) in Hot Springs on February 7. While that station's signal did not reach Little Rock, and it ultimately closed in March 1988, TVX Broadcast Group signed on Pine Bluff–licensed KJTM-TV (channel 38) on June 17, subsequently becoming the market's original Fox affiliate on October 6 of that year. As the established independent in the market, KLRT continued to maintain a lead against its competitors. During the late 1980s, KLRT also maintained an innovative partnership with Storer Cable's Little Rock system; the station occasionally leased airtime to Storer to offer free previews of programming from basic and premium cable channels carried by the system, in addition to co-sponsoring various community service projects.

=== As a Fox affiliate ===
TVX sold KJTM in 1988 to MMC Television, which changed the station's call sign to KASN. In September 1989, KLRT-TV management announced that Fox programming would be moving to channel 16, which caught KASN management off guard. The two had been in discussions about channel 16 acquiring channel 38's Fox affiliation and most of its programming inventory, with KASN likely to fill its broadcast day with home shopping or other content, though nothing had been finalized. However, on September 27, 1989, KLRT management decided to pull out of the deal; Scollard reportedly notified MMC that the asset sale would not be moving forward in a letter faxed to station management. Fox shifted back to KASN after 42 days under a separate contract that MMC and Fox struck during the asset negotiations, which reverted the affiliation rights to KASN if the proposed asset merger was not completed by October 21, 1989.

Fox changed hands again on April 28, 1990, when the network moved its programming to KLRT on a full-time basis. Little Rock became one of several markets in the South where the Fox affiliation moved during the course of 1990; three of the four cases, including Little Rock, involved former TVX stations losing Fox. After learning that KASN would lose its Fox affiliation for good, MMC Television filed a lawsuit against LRCA with the U.S. District Court for the Northern District of Illinois over the failed merger, alleging civil conspiracy, misappropriation of trade secrets, breach of contract, and fraud. MMC Television claimed the asset merger was a deliberate effort by KLRT management to "dismantle" KASN, while LRCA asserted that MMC misrepresented its actions and concealed KASN's financial difficulties in the suit.

Clear Channel Communications purchased KLRT from the LRCA/Scollard partnership on March 6, 1991, for $6.6 million (equivalent to $13.5 million in 2025). Clear Channel purchased the non-license assets of KASN from the Pruett family that July, leasing them back to the station in a move that cleared channel 38's debts. The next year, Mercury Broadcasting, a company owned by Van H. Archer III, acquired KASN itself in exchange for the assumption of $14.3 million in debt. Clear Channel then entered into a joint sales agreement (JSA) that September, allowing it to handle advertising and promotional services for KASN. The JSA was amended into a standard local marketing agreement (LMA) on January 1, 1995, with operations for KASN consolidated at KLRT's facilities. After the passage of the Telecommunications Act of 1996, Clear Channel then acquired five local FM stations in 1996 and 1997; upon the legalization of duopolies in December 1999, it purchased KASN and three other stations outright in a deal worth $11.6 million (equivalent to $20.6 million in 2025). A combined radio/television studio facility for Clear Channel's Little Rock stations, dubbed the "Clear Channel Metroplex", was opened in March 2001 in West Little Rock. The National Bank of Arkansas purchased KLRT–KASN's former Markham Street studios in 2003 for redevelopment.

KLRT and KASN were included in the sale of Clear Channel's television station portfolio to Newport Television, controlled by Providence Equity Partners, for $1.2 billion on April 20, 2007 (equivalent to $1.74 billion in 2025). The sale was made so Clear Channel could refocus around its radio, outdoor advertising and live event units. The sale received FCC approval on December 1, 2007; after settlement of a lawsuit filed by Clear Channel owners Thomas H. Lee Partners and Bain Capital against Providence to force the deal's completion, consummation took place on March 14, 2008.

=== Mission ownership and Nexstar management ===
As part of a liquidation of Newport Television's assets, Nexstar Broadcasting Group purchased KLRT and KASN in a 12-station deal worth $285.5 million (equivalent to $384 million in 2025) announced on July 19, 2012. Due to Nexstar already owning KARK-TV and KARZ-TV, KLRT and KASN were subsequently resold to Mission Broadcasting for $59.7 million (equivalent to $80.4 million in 2025), with Nexstar effectively taking over both stations under a new LMA, continuing a business practice established between the otherwise two separate companies.

The transfer for KLRT and KASN to Mission was consummated on January 1, 2013. The creation of a four-station cluster in the same market resulted in substantial downsizing on January 3, 2013, with 20 employees from KLRT–KASN dismissed along with eight KARK–KARZ staffers; this included KLRT–KASN general manager Chuck Spohn, who was replaced with KARK–KARZ management. KLRT–KASN concurrently moved from the Clear Channel Metroplex to KARK–KARZ's studios at the Victory Building in Little Rock's downtown.

== News operation ==
For most of its early history, KLRT-TV only provided news in the form of brief news and weather updates, originally known as Newscap 16. The original anchor was Bill Powell, formerly of KTHV. By 1988, news updates were presented by staff from Arkansas Radio Network flagship KARN (920 AM), while weather segments were presented by local radio personality Craig O'Neill, who often introduced segments as his radio character "Sherman Bonner, the Human Thermometer". On September 4, 2000, KLRT premiered Fox First Weather, a five-minute local weather segment aired at 10 p.m. and produced by AccuWeather.

KLRT started building out a full-scale news department in September 2003 with the hiring of Michael Fabac from WNEM-TV in Bay City, Michigan, as news director; the Clear Channel Metroplex, selected because it was deemed of sufficient size to house a news operation, was also renovated. The brief news updates and First Weather segments were discontinued in December 2003 in advance of the debut of the hour-long Fox 16 News at Nine on March 28, 2004. It was the first attempt at a 9 p.m. newscast in the market following the closure of KKYK-TV's news department in September 1999. At launch, the newscast was anchored on weeknights by Donna Terrell, Kevin Kelly, Troy Bridges and David Raath, with weekends handled by Kim Betton, Nate Higgins and Justin Holgate; Dewayne Graham, formerly of KATV, was the station's lead investigative reporter.

Ratings slowly inched up for the newscast, bringing KLRT just behind KARK-TV for third place in the overall market by May 2005. Weeknight newscasts at 5 and 5:30 p.m. were added on March 19, 2007, followed by a nightly 10 p.m. newscast on January 18, 2010.

After Mission acquired KLRT in 2013, much of the station's news staff was laid off as the news department was to be consolidated with KARK, including news director Ed Trauschke (who replaced Fabac in 2007) and sports anchor David Raath. Weeknight anchors Terrell and Kelly and chief meteorologist Jeff Baskin were among those who remained with the station as Mission employees, while weekend anchor Kelly Dudzik left for an anchor/reporter role at WGRZ in Buffalo, New York. In early February, the news departments were consolidated. KLRT's 5 and 10 p.m. newscasts were discontinued, while the 5:30 and 9 p.m. newscasts were retained and a new morning show, Good Day Arkansas, was launched to supplant the existing 7 a.m. newscast on KARZ. As KLRT-TV moved in with KARK-TV at the latter's facility, the surplus KLRT-TV set was shipped by Nexstar to WATN-TV in Memphis, Tennessee, which moved into new studios and relaunched its news product that year.

== Technical information ==
=== Subchannels ===
KLRT-TV's transmitter is located at the Shinall Mountain antenna farm, near the Chenal Valley neighborhood of Little Rock. The station's signal is multiplexed:

Subchannels of KLRT-TV
Subchannel	Res.	Short name	Programming
16.1	720p	KLRT-TV	Fox
16.2	480i	IonMyst	Ion Mystery
42.1	720p	KARZ-DT	MyNetworkTV (KARZ-TV)
42.2	480i	Bounce	Bounce TV (KARZ-TV)

Broadcast on behalf of another station

Since 2016, KLRT has carried Ion Mystery as a subchannel via a groupwide deal between Mission/Nexstar and Katz Broadcasting. In July 2021, KLRT-TV became one of five participating Little Rock stations in the market's ATSC 3.0 (NextGen TV) deployment, carrying two subchannels of KARZ-TV while that station broadcasts KLRT-TV in 3.0.

=== Analog-to-digital conversion ===
KLRT-TV signed on its digital signal on UHF channel 30 on May 1, 2002. The station shut down its analog signal, over UHF channel 16, on the digital transition deadline date of June 12, 2009. The station's digital signal remained on its pre-transition UHF channel 30, using virtual channel 16.
