= KASN =

Television station in Pine Bluff, Arkansas

- Pine Bluff–Little Rock, Arkansas; United States
- City: Pine Bluff, Arkansas
- Channels: Digital: 34 (UHF); Virtual: 38
- Branding: The CW Arkansas

Programming
- Affiliations: 38.1: The CW; for others, see § Subchannels

Ownership
- Owner: Mission Broadcasting, Inc.
- Operator: Nexstar Media Group
- Sister stations: KLRT-TV, KARK-TV, KARZ-TV; Tegna: KTHV

History
- First air date: June 17, 1986
- Former call signs: KJTM-TV (1986–1988)
- Former channel numbers: Analog: 38 (UHF, 1986–2009); Digital: 39 (UHF, 2002–2018)
- Former affiliations: Independent (1986, 1990–1995); Fox (1986–1990); UPN (1995–2006)
- Call sign meaning: "Arkansas State Network"

Technical information
- Licensing authority: FCC
- Facility ID: 41212
- ERP: 1,000 kW
- HAAT: 589.6 m (1,934 ft)
- Transmitter coordinates: 34°26′31″N 92°13′4″W

Links
- Public license information: Public file; LMS
- Website: www.fox16.com/the-cwarkansas

KASN (channel 38) is a television station licensed to Pine Bluff, Arkansas, United States, serving as the Little Rock market's outlet for The CW. It is owned by Mission Broadcasting alongside Fox affiliate KLRT-TV (channel 16) and operated by Nexstar Media Group, owner of KARK-TV (channel 4), KTHV (channel 11), and KARZ-TV (channel 42). KASN, KLRT-TV, KARK-TV and KARZ-TV share studios at the Victory Building on West Capitol Avenue and South Victory Street (near the Arkansas State Capitol) in downtown Little Rock; KASN's transmitter is located at the Redfield Tower, two miles (3.2 km) west of Redfield in Grant County.

Channel 38 was established by TVX Broadcast Group in June 1986 as KJTM-TV, the second independent station in the Little Rock market and was the Fox affiliate for central Arkansas from 1986 to 1990. It struggled to compete with KLRT-TV, the original independent in the market. TVX sold the station in 1987, and it was renamed KASN in January 1988. Ultimately, KASN lost the Fox affiliation to KLRT-TV after a protracted struggle; beginning in 1992, KLRT handled certain sales, marketing and operational functions for channel 38. KASN affiliated with UPN in 1995 and The CW in 2006. Both stations were sold to Mission Broadcasting in 2012 in conjunction with consolidation with the city's Nexstar stations.

== History ==
=== KJTM-TV: Early years ===
The construction permit for channel 38 in Pine Bluff was filed for on January 14, 1983, and granted on May 18 of that year to Pine Bluff Broadcasting Inc. This company represented the merger of two applicants: one headed by siblings A. G. Kasselburg and Chloee Poag and American Satellite & Television of Gainesville, Florida. Pine Bluff Broadcasting was unable to arrange financing to build the station. As a result, on March 14, 1985, Pine Bluff Broadcasting sold 80 percent of the construction permit, bearing the call sign KMJD-TV, to Virginia Beach–based Television Corp. Stations (subsequently renamed TVX Broadcast Group) for $200,000; the Federal Communications Commission (FCC) granted approval of the purchase on May 15.

In December 1985, TVX announced its plans for channel 38. Under new KJTM-TV call letters, (Note: TVX's station in Winston-Salem, North Carolina, had been WJTM-TV for TVX executives John Trinder and Tim McDonald from 1980 to 1984, when it changed its call sign to honor an employee killed by a gunman.) it would operate as an independent station, the market's second after KLRT-TV, with studios in the Little Rock area and in Pine Bluff. (Note: A third independent station, KRZB-TV in Hot Springs, went on the air in February 1986. Its signal did not reach Little Rock. It closed down in March 1988.) Construction of the new station's tower at Redfield, midway between Little Rock and Pine Bluff, was beset by a shortage of guy wire and later by persistent rains that thwarted attempts to start on three consecutive Mondays. TVX sent postcards to the local news media featuring a story about the station's efforts to go on air being thwarted by the rain and a drawing of ducks around an unfinished tower, declaring that the rain was "why ducks like Arkansas".

KJTM-TV finally began broadcasting on June 17, 1986. A month later, the station scored a coup over its established competitor when it beat out KLRT-TV to become the region's Fox affiliate upon the network's October 1986 startup. Despite this, KLRT-TV continued to remain the leading independent station in the Little Rock market. (Note: Fox affiliates continued to be considered independent stations for a number of years after Fox launched, particularly as Fox did not program a full seven-night schedule early on. The Fox owned-and-operated stations did not leave the trade association for independent stations, INTV, until 1992.)

=== KASN: Loss of Fox affiliation ===
Amid a shift by TVX to operating in markets larger than Little Rock, TVX put KJTM-TV up for sale. It initially reached an agreement to sell to Detroit-based Barden Communications; the $6 million transaction was terminated in late March 1988. By this time, the Pine Bluff studio had been closed, with all operations being handled from studios in Little Rock along Interstate 30.

After the Barden transaction failed to materialize, TVX sold the station to Evanston, Illinois–based MMC Television Corp. (principally owned by Paula Baird Pruett) for $6 million; the sale received FCC approval on June 15, 1988. Paula Pruett's husband, Steven, was a former Arkansan, and their company ran Fox affiliate WMSN-TV in Madison, Wisconsin. The station's call letters were changed to KASN (for "Arkansas State Network") on October 15, 1988.

In September 1989, KLRT-TV management announced that Fox programming would be moving to channel 16, which caught KASN management off guard. The two stations had been in discussions about channel 16 acquiring channel 38's Fox affiliation and most of its programming inventory, with KASN likely to fill its broadcast day with home shopping or other content, though nothing had been finalized. On September 27, however, KLRT management decided to pull out of the deal; KLRT-TV general manager Steve Scollard reportedly notified MMC that the asset sale would not be moving forward in a letter faxed to station management. Fox shifted back to KASN after 42 days under a separate contract that MMC and Fox struck during the asset negotiations, which reverted the affiliation rights to KASN if the proposed asset merger was not completed by October 21, 1988.

Fox changed hands again on April 28, 1990, when the network moved its programming to KLRT on a full-time basis. Little Rock became one of several markets in the South where the Fox affiliation moved during the course of 1990; three of the four cases, including Little Rock, involved former TVX stations losing Fox. After learning that KASN would lose its Fox affiliation for good, MMC Television filed a lawsuit against LRCA with the U.S. District Court for the Northern District of Illinois over the failed merger, alleging civil conspiracy, misappropriation of trade secrets, breach of contract, and fraud. MMC Television claimed the asset merger was a deliberate effort by KLRT management to "dismantle" KASN, while LRCA asserted that MMC misrepresented its actions and concealed KASN's financial difficulties in the suit.

After acquiring KLRT-TV earlier in the year, Clear Channel purchased the non-license assets of KASN in July 1991, leasing them back to Pruett in a move that cleared KASN's debts. Operations of KASN were consolidated into KLRT's studios on Markham Street. The next year, Mercury Broadcasting, a company owned by Van H. Archer III, acquired KASN itself in exchange for the assumption of $14.3 million in debt. Clear Channel then entered into a joint sales agreement (JSA) that September, allowing it to handle advertising and promotional services for KASN. The JSA was amended into a standard local marketing agreement (LMA) on January 1, 1995.

=== UPN affiliation ===
On January 16, 1995, KASN became a charter affiliate of the United Paramount Network (UPN) as part of a 1994 affiliation deal for four stations owned by Clear Channel and Mercury.

After the passage of the Telecommunications Act of 1996, Clear Channel acquired five local FM stations in 1996 and 1997; upon the legalization of duopolies in December 1999, it purchased KASN and three other stations outright in a deal worth $11.6 million (equivalent to $22.5 million in 2025). A combined radio/television studio facility for Clear Channel's Little Rock stations, dubbed the "Clear Channel Metroplex", opened in March 2001 in West Little Rock; the National Bank of Arkansas purchased KLRT and KASN's former Markham Street studios in 2003 for redevelopment.

In 2003, management with KLRT and KASN fought Nielsen Media Research over an issue it believed was leading to ratings misstatements for channel 38. It ascribed precipitous ratings declines for some of its syndicated shows to an undersampled Black audience in the Little Rock designated market area; this most severely affected sitcoms with primarily Black casts like Moesha and The Hughleys, which went from pulling nine to twelve percent of the marketplace to a zero share. The Media Rating Council, which accredits television ratings, agreed with the station's contention that the Black audience was undersampled in the May 2003 survey but did not discard the ratings.

=== CW affiliation ===
In January 2006, UPN and The WB announced they would merge that fall to form The CW. Clear Channel affiliated three stations with the network that April, in Cincinnati, Salt Lake City, and KASN in Little Rock. KASN affiliated with The CW when that network launched on September 18.

KLRT and KASN were included in the sale of Clear Channel's television station portfolio to Newport Television, controlled by Providence Equity Partners, for $1.2 billion on April 20, 2007 (equivalent to $1.86 billion in 2025). The sale was made so Clear Channel could refocus around its radio, outdoor advertising and live event units. The sale received FCC approval on December 1, 2007; after settlement of a lawsuit filed by Clear Channel owners Thomas H. Lee Partners and Bain Capital against Providence to force the deal's completion, consummation took place on March 14, 2008.

As part of a liquidation of Newport Television's assets, Nexstar Broadcasting Group purchased KLRT and KASN in a 12-station deal worth $285.5 million (equivalent to $400 million in 2025) on July 19, 2012. Due to Nexstar already owning KARK-TV and KARZ-TV, KLRT and KASN were subsequently resold to Mission Broadcasting for $59.7 million (equivalent to $83.7 million in 2025) with Nexstar effectively taking over both stations under a new LMA, continuing a business practice established between the two otherwise separate companies. The creation of a four-station cluster in the same market resulted in substantial downsizing on January 3, 2013, with 20 employees from KLRT and KASN dismissed along with eight KARK–KARZ staffers; this included general manager Chuck Spohn, who was replaced with management from KARK and KARZ. KLRT and KASN concurrently moved from the Clear Channel Metroplex to KARK–KARZ's studios at the Victory Building in Little Rock's downtown.

== Technical information ==
=== Subchannels ===
KASN broadcasts from a tower two miles (3.2 km) west of Redfield in Grant County. The station's signal is multiplexed:

Subchannels of KASN
Subchannel	Res.	Short name	Programming
38.1	1080i	KASN-HD	The CW
38.2	480i	Rewind	Rewind TV
38.3	480i	ION	Ion
38.4	480i	IonPlus	Ion Plus
38.5	480i	Shop LC	Shop LC

=== Analog-to-digital conversion; spectrum repack ===
KASN signed on its digital signal on UHF channel 39 on September 4, 2002. The station shut down its analog signal, over UHF channel 38, on February 17, 2009, the original deadline for American full-power television stations to transition exclusively to digital broadcasts (which was later pushed back to June 12, 2009). The station's digital signal remained on its pre-transition UHF channel 39, continuing to use virtual channel 38.

As a part of the broadcast frequency repacking process following the 2016–17 FCC incentive auction, KASN relocated its digital signal to UHF channel 34 on November 30, 2018.
