= KARZ-TV =

Television station in Little Rock, Arkansas

ATSC 3.0 station
- Little Rock, Arkansas; United States
- Channels: Digital: 28 (UHF); Virtual: 42
- Branding: Z42

Programming
- Affiliations: 42.1: Independent with MyNetworkTV; 42.2: Bounce TV

Ownership
- Owner: Nexstar Media Group; (Nexstar Media Inc.)
- Sister stations: KARK-TV, KLRT-TV, KASN; Tegna: KTHV

History
- Founded: July 7, 1987
- First air date: December 1, 1997
- Former call signs: KVUT (1991–1998); KYPX (1998–2001); KLRA-TV (2001); KWBF (2001–2009)
- Former channel numbers: Analog: 42 (UHF, 1997–2009); Digital: 44 (UHF, 2005–2018)
- Former affiliations: inTV (1997–1998); Pax TV (1998–2001); The WB (2001–2006)
- Call sign meaning: Derived from KARK-TV

Technical information
- Licensing authority: FCC
- Facility ID: 37005
- ERP: 340 kW
- HAAT: 538.3 m (1,766 ft)
- Transmitter coordinates: 34°47′57″N 92°29′30″W

Links
- Public license information: Public file; LMS
- Website: www.kark.com

KARZ-TV (channel 42) is a television station in Little Rock, Arkansas, United States. It is programmed primarily as an independent station, but maintains a secondary affiliation with MyNetworkTV. KARZ-TV is owned by Nexstar Media Group alongside NBC affiliate KARK-TV (channel 4) and co-managed with Fox affiliate KLRT-TV (channel 16) and CW station KASN (channel 38); Nexstar's Tegna subsidiary owns CBS affiliate KTHV (channel 11). KARZ-TV, KARK-TV, KLRT-TV and KASN share studios at the Victory Building on West Capitol Avenue and South Victory Street (near the Arkansas State Capitol) in downtown Little Rock; KARZ-TV's transmitter is located at the Shinall Mountain antenna farm, near the city's Chenal Valley neighborhood.

== History ==
=== Early history ===
Leininger-Geddes Broadcasting (owned by Mobile, Alabama–based business consultant Dale Leininger and Darrell Geddes, then-pastor of Little Rock's Solid Rock Assembly of God) filed the initial application for the UHF channel 42 license with the Federal Communications Commission (FCC) on June 7, 1985. The group—which received approval for the construction permit in a proceeding by FCC administrative law judge Joseph Stirmer on November 4, 1986, later issued by the FCC on July 7, 1987—was granted the license over three other groups: Magnolia Communications (owned by Pine Bluff–based businessman U. S. McPherson); Capitol Communications Corp. (led by Little Rock-based corporate communications director Steve Stephens, minority owner of KLRT-TV); and Maumelle TV Inc. (Magnolia and Maumelle TV's respective cases contesting Leininger-Geddes' application, both concerning management integration and issues with antenna height and possible adjacent channel interference with KJTM-TV, were dismissed with prejudice by Stirmer on June 26 and 30, 1986.) The construction permit remained dormant for nine years until Paxson Communications purchased a 49% share of the license—forming the joint venture Channel 42 of Little Rock, LLC—on June 21, 1996; Paxson entered into a local marketing agreement on August 21, 1996, deal was approved on September 17.

Channel 42 first signed on the air on December 1, 1997, as KVUT. Under Paxson, the station originally operated as an affiliate of the company's Infomall TV Network (InTV) infomercial service, supplemented by overnight religious programming from The Worship Network and the contemporary Christian Praise TV. Channel 42 changed its call letters to KYPX on March 16, 1998. Six months later, on August 31, KYPX became a charter affiliate of Paxson's fledgling family-oriented network Pax TV. The station originally maintained studio facilities located on South Shackleford Road (near I-430 and West 36th Street) in southwestern Little Rock. On April 2, 1999, Paxson purchased the 51% interest in KYPX held by Leininger-Geddes for $1.25 million in stock; the purchase of the majority share was approved by the FCC on May 17, and was finalized on June 24. Subsequently on March 8, 2000, Paxson announced it would sell the station to Little Rock-based Equity Broadcasting Corporation, owner of Camden-licensed WB affiliate KKYK-TV (channel 49) and Little Rock repeater KKYK-LP (channel 22), for $7.5 million; the sale received FCC approval on August 3, and was finalized on August 28. The station subsequently relocated its operations into Equity's Shackleford Drive headquarters (near North Shackelford Road and West Markham Street) in northwestern Little Rock.

=== WB affiliation ===
In order to provide the network broader signal coverage within the Little Rock market, on January 29, 2001, Equity transferred KKYK's WB network and syndicated programming to channel 42 under the call sign KLRA-TV (in reference to its city of license); KYPX's call sign and Pax programming concurrently moved to channel 49. Alongside WB prime time and children's programming, channel 42—which accordingly began branding as "WB42"—maintained a general entertainment format consisting of first-run syndicated shows, recent off-network sitcoms and drama series, syndicated cartoons, weekend movie presentations and religious programs. Seven months later on August 22, the station's call letters were changed again to KWBF, a dual reference to its WB affiliation and network mascot Michigan J. Frog, from whom the nickname used by KWBF until The WB shut down ("The Frog", which remained in use after Michigan was "retired" by the network in July 2005) was borrowed. Under Equity ownership, channel 42 served as the group's flagship station. KWBF also relayed its programming on two low-power translators: KWBF-LP (channel 5) in Sheridan and KWBK-LP (channel 45) in Pine Bluff. (KWBF-LP would move to UHF channel 47, re-called KEJC-LP, in 2005 through an agreement between Equity and the Arkansas Educational Television Network to assign VHF 5 for its flagship station KETS [channel 2]'s digital signal; both KWBF-LP and KWBK-LP would cease operations in 2008.)

=== MyNetworkTV affiliation; Nexstar ownership ===
On February 22, 2006, News Corporation announced the launch of MyNetworkTV, which it developed as a programming option for UPN- and WB-affiliated stations that were not chosen to affiliate with The CW, which was founded by CBS Corporation and Time Warner on January 24 and would incorporate UPN and The WB's higher-rated programs within its initial lineup. On April 24, Equity Media announced that KWBF would become the market's MyNetworkTV charter affiliate. The CW affiliation went to UPN affiliate KASN, as part of a deal with Clear Channel Television that also involved its sister stations in Cincinnati and Salt Lake City. KWBF joined MyNetworkTV upon the network's launch on September 5, two weeks before The WB formally ceased operations; at that time, the station began branding itself as "My 42".

On October 7, 2008, Channel 42 was acquired by Irving, Texas–based Nexstar Broadcasting Group, which had owned NBC affiliate KARK-TV since 2003, for $4 million. On December 8, amid attempts by creditor Silver Point Finance to force the company into liquidation, Equity Media filed for Chapter 11 bankruptcy protection in the U.S. District Court for the Eastern District of Arkansas. The FCC approved Nexstar's purchase of KWBF on December 23, and the sale was finalized on January 30, 2009. (The purchase was legally consummated on March 12.) Nexstar assumed operational control of Channel 42 on February 1, 2009, with its operations being integrated into KARK's Victory Building studios in downtown Little Rock; concurrently, the station changed its callsign to KARZ-TV and began branding as "Z 42". (The base logo design and radio-inspired naming scheme adopted by KARZ on that date would later be applied to other Nexstar-run MyNetworkTV affiliates, including nearby sister stations KOZL in Springfield, Missouri, and KSHV-TV in Shreveport.)

On July 19, 2012, Nexstar reached an agreement to acquire 12 stations owned by Kansas City–based Newport Television, including the duopoly of KLRT and KASN, for $285.5 million. Because the FCC bars a single company from owning both two of the four highest-rated stations and more than two stations overall in the same market, the licenses of KLRT and KASN were transferred to Westlake, Ohio–based Mission Broadcasting (which owns stations managed by Nexstar in markets where the latter cannot legally own multiple television properties) for $60 million. The sale of KLRT/KASN to Mission received FCC approval on December 10, 2012, and was completed on January 3, 2013; Nexstar took over the operations of KLRT and KASN, which were relocated to KARK/KARZ's Victory Building studios, under a local marketing agreement on February 2, 2013. As a result, Nexstar/Mission's Little Rock cluster became one of only two "virtual quadropolies"—four local full-power stations managed by one company—in existence in American television. (Sinclair Broadcast Group, owner of WEAR-TV and WFGX in that market, concurrently acquired Newport's Mobile–Pensacola duopoly of WPMI and WJTC in a similar arrangement through Deerfield Media.)

Nexstar acquired Tegna—owner of CBS affiliate KTHV (channel 11)—in a deal announced in August 2025 and completed in March 2026.

== Programming ==
KARZ may occasionally take on the responsibility of running NBC network shows in place of regular programming in the event that extended breaking news or severe weather coverage is carried on KARK-TV. From 2001 to 2012, channel 42 frequently aired ABC sports telecasts and occasional non-sports programs (such as ABC's January 2008 Democratic and Republican presidential primary debates) preempted by KATV (channel 7) due to its commitments to Arkansas Razorbacks sporting events or to run infomercials for additional revenue. In January 2006, three years before it was purchased by Nexstar, the station made headlines when it decided to air the NBC comedy-drama series The Book of Daniel after KARK-TV station management declined to carry it amid complaints about controversial material revolving around the vices of the Episcopalian minister lead and his dysfunctional family, its depiction of Jesus (with which the lead conversed) as tolerant of perceived sinful behaviors, and openly gay characters that some conservative Christian groups found objectionable. KWBF came under fire for their decision to air Daniel, even hiring extra security following threats made to the station. KWBF aired the program in its regular 9 p.m. (CT) network timeslot following The WB's Friday night lineup. The controversy soon became moot as The Book of Daniel was canceled by NBC after four episodes, with its remaining nine episodes eventually being released on the network's website.

=== Sports programming ===
From 2001 to 2008, KARZ (as KWBF) held the local broadcast rights to NFL preseason games from the Kansas City Chiefs through the team's Chiefs Television Network syndication service. In September 2009, KARZ debuted Fearless Live (renamed Fearless Friday in 2011 and the Fearless Game of the Week in 2019), showcasing weekly regular season high school football games sanctioned by the Arkansas Activities Association (AAA); since 2013, the KARZ game telecasts have been replayed on KASN on a one-night delay.

=== Newscasts ===
On February 21, 2005, KWBF began producing a half-hour weeknight 5:30 p.m. newscast (titled The WB42 5:30 Report). Anchored by Doug Krile (who served in previous anchor roles at KARK from 1991 to 1997, and then for then-sister KKYK's prime time newscast from 1997 to 1999), it featured a wrap-up of the day's headlines as well as a long-form discussion of notable current events; the program (along with a similarly formatted 10 p.m. newscast for KYPX) was canceled in August 2006. (Krile remained with KWBF/KYPX as Equity's corporate director of news and public relations until February 2007.)

On February 1, 2009, as Nexstar assumed management responsibilities for channel 42, KARK-TV began producing an hour-long weeknight 7 p.m. newscast for KARZ. Titled KARK 4 News: First in Prime (retitled KARK 4 News at 7:00 on Z42 in February 2010), and originally anchored by Sonseeaharay Tonsall and longtime KARK weather anchor Tracy Douglass, the newscast's launch resulted in KARZ moving MyNetworkTV's prime time lineup to a one-hour delay (from 8 to 10 p.m.). On August 29, 2010, KARK began producing a two-hour extension of its weekday morning newscast, KARK 4 News Today (originally airing from 7 to 9 a.m.) for KARZ; the program—originally anchored by Matt Mosler, Mallory Hardin and Wendy Suares—competed against the national morning news programs seen on the "Big Three" networks.

On April 20, 2011, KARK became the third television station in the Little Rock–Pine Bluff market (and the first Nexstar-owned station) to begin broadcasting its local newscasts in high definition; the KARZ broadcasts were included in the upgrade. The 7 p.m. newscast was discontinued on September 2, 2011; on September 5, the station added a half-hour late-evening sports program, Arkansas Sports Nation, a co-production of KARK and Fayetteville sister station KNWA-TV. All KARK-produced news programming on KARZ was discontinued on February 1, 2013; the morning newscast was repurposed as a KLRT broadcast on February 4, 2013, after production of that station's newscasts was absorbed into KARK's news department through the KLRT/KASN duopoly's JSA/SSA with Nexstar.

== Technical information ==
The station's ATSC 1.0 guest and 3.0 lighthouse signals are multiplexed:

Subchannels provided by KARZ-TV on the KLRT multiplex
| Subchannel | Res. | Short name | Programming |
|---|---|---|---|
| 42.1 | 720p | KARZ-DT | Main KARZ-TV programming |
| 42.2 | 480i | Bounce | Bounce TV |

Subchannels of KARZ-TV (ATSC 3.0)
| Subchannel | Res. | Short name | Programming |
|---|---|---|---|
| 4.1 | 1080p | KARK | NBC (KARK-TV) |
| 7.1 | 720p | KATV | ABC (KATV) |
| 7.10 | 1080p | T2 | T2 |
| 7.11 | 1080p | PBTV | Pickleballtv |
| 7.20 | | GMLOOP | GameLoop |
| 11.1 | 1080p | KTHV | CBS (KTHV) |
| 16.1 | 720p | KLRT | Fox (KLRT-TV) |
| 42.1 | 720p | KARZ | Main KARZ-TV programming |

Subchannel broadcast with digital rights management
Subchannel streamed via the Internet

=== Analog-to-digital conversion; spectrum repack; ATSC 3.0 deployment ===
KARZ-TV (as KWBF-TV) signed on its digital signal on UHF channel 44 on March 23, 2005. The station shut down its analog signal, over UHF channel 42, on June 12, 2009, the federal deadline for American full-power television stations to transition exclusively to digital broadcasts. The station's digital signal remained on its pre-transition UHF channel 44, using virtual channel 42.

As a part of the broadcast frequency repacking process following the 2016–17 FCC incentive auction, KARZ-TV, which was initially assigned to move to UHF channel 14, relocated its digital signal to UHF channel 28 on November 30, 2018.

On June 30, 2021, KARZ commenced ATSC 3.0 broadcasts as the designated NextGen TV host station for the Little Rock–Pine Bluff market, serving as a 3.0 lighthouse for Nexstar/Mission-owned sister stations KARK-TV and KLRT-TV; CBS affiliate KTHV (owned by Tegna); and ABC affiliate KATV (owned by Sinclair), all owned by broadcasters associated with the Pearl NextGen TV consortium. The station's 3.0 signal transmits over UHF digital channel 28.5001, while the ATSC 1.0 signals of its main feed and DT2 subchannel are farmed as guest signals transmitted by KLRT-TV over digital channels 30.5 and 30.6; both are remapped to virtual channel 42.x on digital television receivers.
