= KARK-TV =

Television station in Little Rock, Arkansas

- Little Rock, Arkansas; United States
- Channels: Digital: 32 (UHF); Virtual: 4
- Branding: KARK 4

Programming
- Affiliations: 4.1: NBC; for others, see § Technical information and subchannels

Ownership
- Owner: Nexstar Media Group; (Nexstar Media Inc.)
- Sister stations: KARZ-TV, KLRT-TV, KASN; Tegna: KTHV

History
- First air date: April 15, 1954
- Former channel numbers: Analog: 4 (VHF, 1954–2009)
- Former affiliations: DuMont (secondary, 1954–1955)
- Call sign meaning: Arkansas

Technical information
- Licensing authority: FCC
- Facility ID: 33440
- ERP: 989 kW
- HAAT: 474 m (1,555 ft)
- Transmitter coordinates: 34°47′57″N 92°30′0″W

Links
- Public license information: Public file; LMS
- Website: www.kark.com

KARK-TV (channel 4) is a television station in Little Rock, Arkansas, United States, affiliated with NBC. It is owned by Nexstar Media Group alongside KARZ-TV (channel 42), an independent station with MyNetworkTV, and co-managed with Fox affiliate KLRT-TV (channel 16) and CW station KASN (channel 38); Nexstar's Tegna subsidiary owns CBS affiliate KTHV (channel 11). KARK-TV, KARZ-TV, KLRT-TV and KASN share studios at the Victory Building on West Capitol Avenue and South Victory Street (near the Arkansas State Capitol) in downtown Little Rock; KARK-TV's transmitter is located on Shinall Mountain.

KARK-TV serves as a master hub for Nexstar and Mission stations in Little Rock and Fayetteville, Arkansas, and Monroe and Shreveport, Louisiana.

== History ==
The station first signed on the air on April 15, 1954; KARK-TV is Little Rock's second-oldest continuously operating television station, after KATV (channel 7), which beat KARK to the air by almost five months. It was owned by oil magnate Thomas Harry Barton along with KARK (920 AM), and was first operated from studios located on Spring Street in Little Rock.

Barton died in 1960 and in 1966 his family sold the station to Mullins Broadcasting, then-owner of KBTV in Denver in 1966. After the company's owner John C. Mullins died in 1969, the Mullins estate sold both KBTV and KARK to Combined Communications in 1972. In 1976, the station moved to a new facility located on West 3rd Street in downtown Little Rock. Combined's television station properties would eventually be acquired by the Gannett Company seven years later in 1979, in what was the largest media merger in United States history at the time. In 1983, Gannett sold KARK to Southwest Media, a subsidiary of United Broadcasting, also the owner of KDBC-TV in El Paso, Texas, and WTOK-TV in Meridian, Mississippi; Gannett would re-enter the Little Rock-Pine Bluff market when it acquired rival CBS affiliate KTHV (channel 11) from the Arkansas Television Company in December 1994.

United Broadcasting sold off its television station properties in 1988, KARK was then sold to Morris Multimedia. In April 2002, KARK relocated its operations from its longtime studios on 3rd Street to its current location on West Capitol Avenue. In 2003, Morris Multimedia sold KARK as well as WDHN in Dothan, Alabama, to the Nexstar Broadcasting Group, which eventually consolidated most of KARK's sports operations with those of its sister stations in Northwest Arkansas, NBC affiliate KNWA-TV and Fox affiliate KFTA-TV.

In October 2008, Nexstar Broadcasting announced that it would purchase MyNetworkTV affiliate KWBF (channel 42) from locally-based Equity Media Holdings for $4 million. The Federal Communications Commission (FCC) approved the purchase on December 23 of that year. However, although the purchase was slated to be finalized at the end of January 2009, its consummation was ultimately delayed nearly a month and a half until March 12 due to Equity's bankruptcy complications. In the interim, Nexstar took over the operations of KWBF through a time brokerage agreement; that station's call letters were changed to KARZ-TV on February 1, 2009.

On July 19, 2012, Newport Television reached a deal to sell 22 of its 27 stations to Nexstar, Sinclair Broadcast Group and Cox Media Group. KLRT-TV and KASN were among the twelve that were acquired by Nexstar. However, since Nexstar already owned KARK and KARZ and in order to comply with FCC regulations prohibiting common ownership between two of the four highest-rated stations in a single market, KLRT and KASN were instead transferred to Mission Broadcasting, a company which is involved in several local marketing and joint sales agreements with Nexstar-owned stations in other markets where Nexstar itself is legally prohibited from owning multiple television stations. The deal was consummated on January 3, 2013. On February 2, the operations of KLRT and KASN were migrated from facilities on Colonel Glenn Road and consolidated with KARK and KARZ at the downtown Little Rock studios that already house the two stations, making it the first instance in which four full-power television stations in one market, carrying affiliations with four of the six major English-language networks (NBC, Fox, The CW and MyNetworkTV) were controlled by one company; and all four having been housed out of one facility. Around 30 positions between the KARK/KARZ and KLRT/KASN duopolies (mainly among management—including KLRT-KASN general manager Chuck Spohn—and news department staff) were eliminated in the consolidation.

Nexstar acquired KTHV owner Tegna in a deal announced in August 2025 and completed on March 19, 2026. A temporary restraining order issued one week later by the U.S. District Court for the Eastern District of California, later escalated to a preliminary injunction, has prevented Nexstar from integrating the stations.

== Programming ==
Outside of local newscasts, KARK-TV produces Talkin' Outdoors at the Corner Café, a special interest program showcasing outdoor recreation produced in cooperation with the Arkansas Game and Fish Commission which airs on Saturday mornings immediately after Weekend Today. Occasionally as time permits, KARZ-TV may air NBC network programs whenever KARK-TV is unable to in the event of extended breaking news or severe weather coverage.

=== Programming history and controversies ===
Unlike most NBC stations in the 1980s, KARK did not have a complete NBC weekend morning lineup. During the 1970s and 1980s, KARK produced multiple locally-produced shows including Matter of Conscience, First Saturday, Kids Like You, and Bozo's Big Top (a revival of a series that previously aired on KATV). At the time, the shows aired in NBC's Saturday morning cartoon slots, replacing multiple cartoon programs that normally aired on NBC, such as Alvin and the Chipmunks, Foofur, Mister T, ALF, and The New Archies among others.

KARK made national news in early 2006 when it decided not to air the NBC dramedy series The Book of Daniel. General manager Rick Rogala at the time issued two statements regarding the issue. The first issued on January 4, 2006, stated: "Our relationship with NBC always provided for the right to reject programming. I am reaffirming that right to let them know I will not allow them to make unilateral decisions affecting our viewers.[..] If my action causes people in our community to pay more attention to what they watch on television, I have accomplished my mission."

A second statement was released two days later citing concerns about FCC rules regarding obscenity: "My first obligation to my station is to protect the license granted by the FCC. Current regulations could subject this station to severe punishment, up to and including revocation of our license if even a single person's objection to the FCC found material broadcast by our station to be indecent or obscene. Subsequent viewing of the material within The Book of Daniel leaves me no choice but to do my job and uphold the standards of our community." The program instead aired in its regular network timeslot on KWBF (now sister station KARZ-TV) on Fridays following WB prime time programming. In part because of preemption of the series by KARK and select other affiliates, as well as low ratings overall, The Book of Daniel was canceled after three episodes with its remaining episodes being released online on NBC's website.

=== News operation ===
KARK presently broadcasts over 34 hours of locally produced newscasts and sports programming each week. The station also produces 19 1/2 hours of weekly news programming for Fox-affiliated sister station KLRT-TV. Between the two stations, the news operation produces about 53 1/2 hours of news programming each week. KARK also produces a Sunday morning political discussion program, Capitol View, as well as a weekly sports program Razorback Nation Pig Trail (which is produced in conjunction with Fayetteville sister station KNWA), which airs Sundays after the 10 p.m. newscast.

For many years, KARK had the top-rated newscasts in the Little Rock market. However, its ratings plummeted in the mid-1990s when the newscasts were changed to follow a tabloid format (which was toned down considerably compared to other television stations); as a result, ABC affiliate KATV took the news ratings lead in the market. Even with the decrease, KARK remained in second place through most of the latter half of the 1990s, before falling to third for a brief period in the early 2000s. KARK has since increased viewership for its newscasts and is now very competitive in the market. A significant aspect of its broadcasts presently is an emphasis of Arkansas-oriented content over national stories. In recent years, due to NBC's prime time struggles in the Nielsen ratings, KARK's newscasts have remained in third place for the most part although close enough to remain competitive with KATV, KLRT, and KTHV.

Since the latter station was acquired by Nexstar in 2004 (one year after Nexstar acquired KARK), KARK and NBC-affiliated sister station KNWA-TV in Rogers have shared certain news resources; some reports filed by KNWA personnel are occasionally used during KARK's news broadcasts. In 2007, the two stations began co-producing a daily newscast titled Arkansas at Noon, with news anchors based in both Little Rock and Fayetteville. In September 2008, KARK began producing an hour-long prime-time newscast at 7 p.m. for sister station KARZ-TV (this resulted in that station airing MyNetworkTV programming one hour later (from 8 to 10 p.m.) than most other affiliates in the Central Time Zone). This expanded to include an hour-long extension of its weekday morning newscast (airing from 7 to 9 a.m., later cut to 7 to 8 a.m.), which debuted in August 2010. All KARK-produced news programming on KARZ was dropped in January 2013, shortly before Nexstar consolidated the news departments of KARK and KLRT-TV.

At the beginning of the 2010–11 television season, Nexstar took the initial steps in upgrading the station's newscasts to high definition through the purchase of JVC HD cameras for in-studio segments, followed by the start of construction of a new news set in early April. On April 20, 2011, KARK became the third television station in the Little Rock market, and the first Nexstar-owned station to begin broadcasting its local newscasts in high definition. The station's former logo, which was reminiscent of that used by fellow NBC affiliate WSMV in Nashville since 1994, was also changed at the same time.

On April 2, 2012, KARK debuted a half-hour weekday noon newscast titled Arkansas Today (formerly the name of a now-defunct midday interview program of the same name on KTHV); the statewide newscast features news stories filed by reporters from all four Nexstar-owned NBC stations serving Arkansas as well as a sports segment produced by KNWA-TV, focusing on University of Arkansas athletics, called Razorback Nation. KNWA, along with KTAL-TV/Shreveport–Texarkana and KTVE/Monroe–El Dorado simulcast the program and utilize their own on-air weather staff to provide local weather inserts during the broadcast that target their specific viewing areas (the coverage areas of KTVE and KTAL include several counties in southern Arkansas (ten in KTAL's viewing area, fourteen in KTVE's), though both stations primarily serve parts of northern Louisiana and KTAL also serves parts of northeast Texas).

On February 5, 2018, KARK premiered an hour-long 4 p.m. newscast.

==== Notable current on-air staff ====
- D. J. Williams – morning anchor

==== Notable former on-air staff ====
- Isiah Carey – general assignment reporter
- Alice Stewart – news anchor and reporter
- Clint Stoerner – sports contributor

== Technical information and subchannels ==
KARK-TV's transmitter is located on Shinall Mountain. The station's signal is multiplexed:

Subchannels of KARK-TV
Subchannel	Res.	Short name	Programming
4.1	1080i	KARK-DT	NBC
4.2	480i	Laff	Laff
4.3	480i	Grit	Grit
4.4	480i	Antenna	Antenna TV

On June 15, 2016, Nexstar announced that it has entered into an affiliation agreement with Katz Broadcasting for the Escape (now Ion Mystery), Laff, Grit, and Bounce TV networks (the last one of which is owned by Bounce Media LLC, whose COO Jonathan Katz is president/CEO of Katz Broadcasting), bringing one or more of the four networks to 81 stations owned and/or operated by Nexstar, including KARK-TV and KLRT-TV (sister station KARZ-TV already airs Bounce TV).

=== Analog-to-digital conversion ===
KARK-TV shut down its analog signal, over VHF channel 4, on February 17, 2009, the original target date for full-power television stations in the United States to transition from analog to digital broadcasts under federal mandate (which was later pushed back to June 12, 2009). The station's digital signal remained on its pre-transition UHF channel 32, using virtual channel 4.
