= KTHV =

Television station in Little Rock, Arkansas

- Little Rock, Arkansas; United States
- Channels: Digital: 12 (VHF); Virtual: 11
- Branding: THV 11

Programming
- Affiliations: 11.1: CBS; for others, see § Subchannels

Ownership
- Owner: Tegna Inc., a subsidiary of Nexstar Media Group; (Cape Publications, Inc.)
- Sister stations: Nexstar: KARK-TV, KARZ-TV, KLRT-TV, KASN

History
- First air date: November 27, 1955
- Former channel number: Analog: 11 (VHF, 1955–2009)
- Call sign meaning: Derived from KTHS radio

Technical information
- Licensing authority: FCC
- Facility ID: 2787
- ERP: 55 kW
- HAAT: 518.7 m (1,701.8 ft)
- Transmitter coordinates: 34°47′57″N 92°30′0″W

Links
- Public license information: Public file; LMS
- Website: www.thv11.com

KTHV (channel 11) is a television station in Little Rock, Arkansas, United States, affiliated with CBS. It is owned by the Tegna subsidiary of Nexstar Media Group; Nexstar owns KARK-TV (channel 4), an NBC affiliate, and KARZ-TV (channel 42), an independent station with MyNetworkTV, and operates Fox affiliate KLRT-TV (channel 16) and CW station KASN (channel 38). KTHV's studios are located on South Izard Street in downtown Little Rock, and its transmitter sits atop Shinall Mountain.

KTHV was the third of Little Rock's major network affiliates to begin broadcasting, going on air in November 1955. It was built by the Arkansas Television Company, a consortium of investors including the Arkansas Democrat and radio station KTHS; it became the full-time CBS affiliate for the market in April 1956. Despite a major change in control of the company in 1977 including the hiring of a successful general manager, KTHV remained deep in third place in its local news ratings. The station had competent news talent but was hampered by a low budget for the news department.

The Gannett Company acquired KTHV from the Arkansas Television Company in 1994 and began a years-long revamp of the news operation, including the addition of new equipment and talent and a rebranding as "Today's THV". The change was successful in lifting the station out of third place in local news for the first time in 30 years, with the station soon trading first place with KATV.

== History ==
=== Arkansas Television Company ownership ===
The Arkansas Television Company, a consortium of various equity interests including KTHS (1090 AM), then located in Hot Springs; Radio Broadcasting Inc., a subsidiary of The Shreveport Times newspaper in Louisiana; the Arkansas Democrat Company; Clyde E. Lowry; and the National Equity Life Insurance Company of Little Rock, filed in July 1952 with the Federal Communications Commission (FCC) for the construction permit to build a new station on channel 4. In February 1953, however, Arkansas Television Company changed its application from channel 4 to channel 11, an action that left station KARK-TV alone in seeking channel 4. The field of competing applicants for the channel slowly winnowed. In August 1953, the Little Rock Television Company pulled out so its lead shareholder, J. D. Wrather, could focus on an application he had filed in Corpus Christi, Texas. Arkansas Telecasters withdrew on October 8, 1954, believing that its move would expedite the establishment of the station. The withdrawal left Arkansas Television Company unopposed, and the FCC granted a construction permit for the station on January 4, 1955.

KTHV began broadcasting on November 27, 1955. It served as an affiliate of CBS and ABC until April 1, 1956, when it became the exclusive CBS station as KATV's network affiliation contract expired. It provisionally occupied studio space in the KTHS building on Main Street until a new two-story facility housing KTHS and KTHV at Eighth and Izard streets were completed in March 1956.

Ownership in the Arkansas Television Company changed in 1977 as the result of two transactions. In May, the Democrat Company—which had sold the newspaper of the same name to WEHCO Media in 1974—acquired shares from Lowry's estate. Three months later, Radio Broadcasting sold its 42-percent interest to several stockholders as well as new KTHV general manager Robert L. Brown Sr. after Gannett acquired The Shreveport Times. With these transactions, the Arkansas Television Company became fully owned by Arkansas interests. The key players were Stanley Berry and Marcus George, who were executors of the stock eventually held by the K. A. Engel Trust, set up by the former owner of the Democrat.

The new management was led by Brown, who had set up KTHV's strong competition in the past. He had hired many of the market's most popular TV personalities when he ran KARK-TV in the late 1960s and early 1970s prior to being promoted by Combined Communications to the position of general manager at KPNX in Phoenix, Arizona. Brown hoped to reduce turnover in personnel by raising its traditionally lower salaries and pull the station out of its status as a distant third behind KATV and a dominant KARK; one joke circulated that the station was in fourth place, even though Little Rock only had three commercial TV stations.

However, under Brown, KTHV never achieved the desired improvement, remaining a distant third in local news in Little Rock, though it was slightly more competitive in the Little Rock metro area as opposed to the full area of dominant influence. By 1990, it was the only one of the three major stations without a local newscast at 6 a.m. or 5 p.m.

=== Gannett acquisition ===
Rumors began to circulate in August 1994 that Gannett was about to buy KTHV; the deal would mark a return to the city for the company, which in addition to once owning KARK-TV shuttered the Arkansas Gazette in 1991. KTHV management denied the station had been sold but noted that interest had picked up in a purchase, with more suitors in six months than the preceding six years; the deal was not officially announced until late September and consisted of a $27 million stock swap. By this time, KTHV was a moneymaker, with no debt and making an estimated $6.2 million to $6.8 million in revenue a year. At the time, KTHV made Little Rock Gannett's second-smallest market, behind Austin, Texas, which had higher revenue. When Gannett took over on December 1, 1994, general manager and minority owner Bob Brown immediately retired; he was 68, and Gannett had a mandatory retirement policy at 65. He was replaced by Paul Trelstad, who had been general sales manager of KPNX.

KTHV's Today's THV logo, used from November 1995 to February 2013.

Gannett's first priority was to turn around the station's newscasts, which had been in third place for decades. Despite competent newsgathering and talent, the lack of resources for the newsroom resulted in a product few watched. Gannett began investing in needed technological upgrades to bring KTHV up to par. From Trelstad's office, he could see a sign of another company, "Today's Office", on a nearby building. That got him thinking about a station in Milwaukee that had added "Today's" to its branding. The resulting rebrand to "Today's THV", implemented despite a negative response from a Gannett executive, also reduced call letter misspellings that brought KTHV closer to KATV. Other changes included new weekend sports coverage and a new male anchor, Larry Audas, to be paired with station stalwart Anne Jansen.

On March 1, 1997, KTHV chief meteorologist Ed Buckner went on the air to cover a significant tornado outbreak that caused damage to much of Arkansas and produced destructive tornadoes. The coverage of the storm by Buckner and Tom Brannon, aided by an investment in Doppler weather radar, was a turning point for the station. At the same time, KARK pivoted to a tabloid news approach which caused viewers to defect to KTHV. Ratings began to rise in 1997, and in April 1999, KTHV surpassed an ailing KARK at 10 p.m. to pull into second place in late news for the first time in nearly 30 years. The event was cause for celebration in the KTHV studios, where signs and posters with the number 2 exclaimed the station's position.

KTHV continued to strengthen its hand when former morning radio DJ Craig O'Neill became the station's new evening sportscaster in 2000. In February 2001, KTHV had an outright win at 10 p.m., the first time KATV had not been in first place in a decade; however, channel 7 had the stronger early evening newscasts. KTHV and KATV continued to fight at 10 p.m. and in mornings through the 2000s, though KATV had regained the lead in both time slots by 2012, leaving KTHV second in ratings and revenue.

On April 6, 2009, KTHV expanded its 6 p.m. newscast to one hour with the addition of a half-hour newscast at 6:30 p.m., the only such newscast in the market at the time. On April 3, 2010, the station debuted a two-hour Saturday morning newscast, competing with KATV.

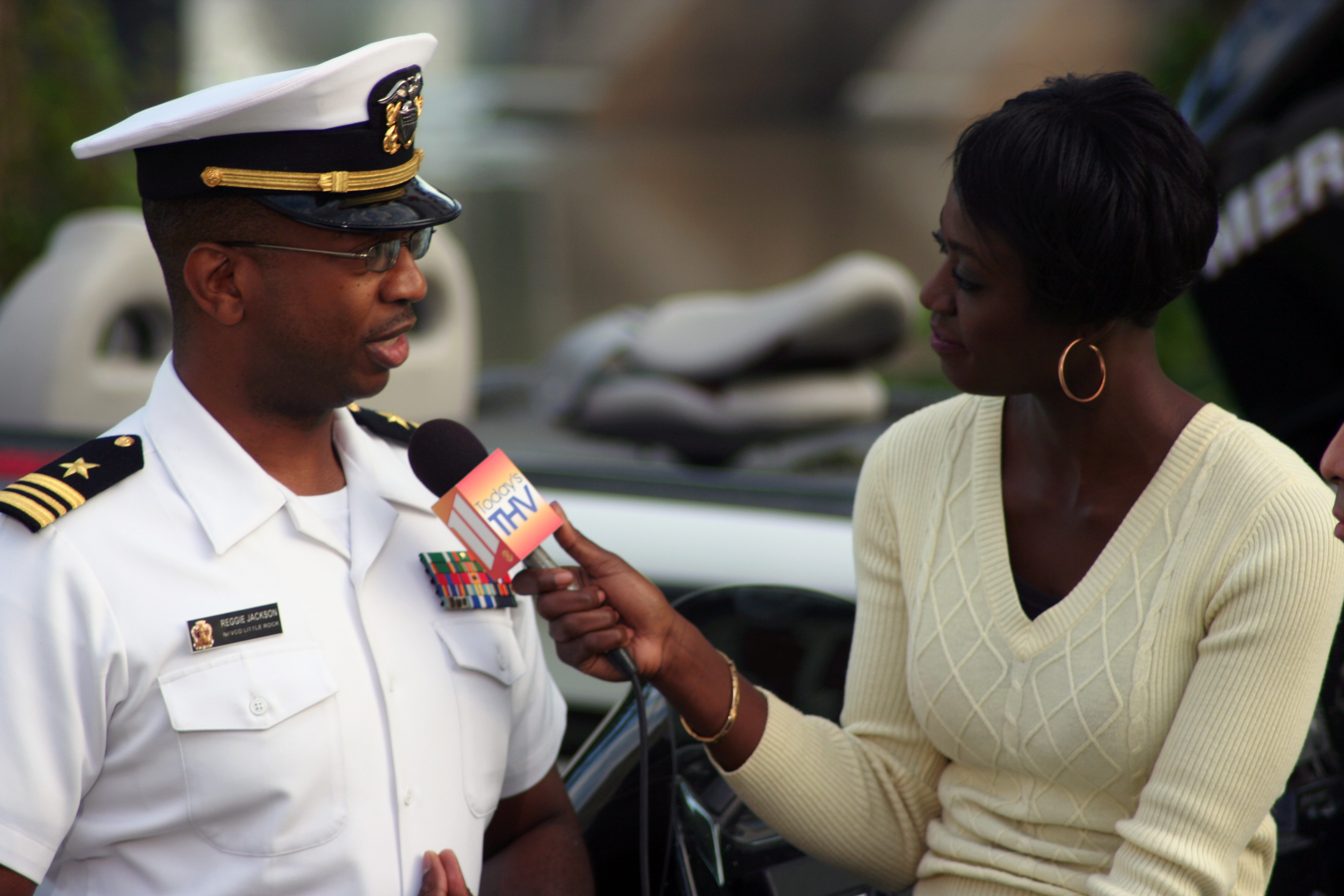
Former KTHV reporter Faith Abubey during a live television broadcast on May 30, 2010.

On September 13, 2010, KTHV moved its weekday morning newscast to 4:30 a.m., expanding it to 2 1/2 hours and becoming the first television station in Arkansas to start its weekday morning newscast before 5 a.m. KTHV was also first in the market and the state with local high definition newscasts, which debuted that December. The station's branding was amended (along with the introduction of a new logo) in February 2013, being revised to "THV11".

On June 29, 2015, Gannett's broadcasting division split from the newspaper division and renamed its broadcasting and digital divisions under the Tegna name (KTHV was included in the transaction to Tegna). In 2019, a new news set debuted as well as two new programs: a refreshed morning newscast, Wake Up Central, and an evening lifestyle program, 630 Central.

=== Nexstar ownership ===
Nexstar Media Group—which in Little Rock owned KARK-TV and KARZ-TV (channel 42) and operated KLRT-TV (channel 16) and KASN (channel 38)—acquired Tegna in a deal announced in August 2025 and completed on March 19, 2026. A temporary restraining order issued one week later by the U.S. District Court for the Eastern District of California, later escalated to a preliminary injunction, has prevented Nexstar from integrating the stations.

== Notable former on-air staff ==
- Alyse Eady – anchor, 2012–2016
- T. J. Holmes – anchor/reporter, 2000–2003
- B. J. Sams – anchor, 1982–2009

== Technical information ==
=== Subchannels ===
KTHV's transmitter is located atop Shinall Mountain. The station's signal is multiplexed:

Subchannels of KTHV
Subchannel	Res.	Short name	Programming
11.1	1080i	KTHV-DT	CBS
11.2	480i	CourtTV	Quest
11.3	480i	Crime	True Crime Network
11.4	480i	Quest	Oxygen
11.5	480i	NOSEY	Nosey
11.6	480i	OPEN	Defy
11.7	480i	BUSTED	Busted
11.8	480i	ShopLC	Shop LC

=== Analog-to-digital conversion ===
In April 2002, KTHV became the first television station in the Little Rock market to broadcast a digital television signal. It was also the first station to begin broadcasting a second subchannel, in 2006. The analog channel on VHF channel 11 ceased regular programming on June 12, 2009, the official date on which full-power television stations in the United States transitioned from analog to digital broadcasts under federal mandate. The station's digital signal remained on its pre-transition VHF channel 12, using virtual channel 11. The analog signal briefly continued to operate as a "nightlight" station to provide transition assistance as part of the SAFER Act.
