= List of radio stations in Texas =

The following is a list of FCC-licensed AM and FM radio stations in the U.S. state of Texas, which can be sorted by their call signs, broadcast frequencies, cities of license, licensees, or programming formats.

== List of radio stations ==
Call sign	Frequency	City of License	Licensee	Format
KABA	90.3 FM	Louise	Aleluya Broadcasting Network	Spanish religious
KABT	101.7 FM	Hawley	WesTex Telco, LLC	Americana
KABW	95.1 FM	Baird	Community Broadcast Partners LLC	Country/Texas Red Dirt
KACB-LP	96.9 FM	College Station	Saint Teresa Catholic Church	Spanish Catholic
KACC	89.7 FM	Alvin	Alvin Community College	Album-oriented rock
KACD-LP	94.1 FM	Midland	Helping Others Prepare for Empowerment (HOPE)	Religious
KACQ	101.9 FM	Lometa	Debra L. Witcher	Country
KACT	1360 AM	Andrews	Andrews Broadcasting Company Incorporated	Country
KACT-FM	105.5 FM	Andrews	Andrews Broadcasting Company Incorporated	Country
KACU	89.5 FM	Abilene	Abilene Christian University	Public radio
KACV-FM	89.9 FM	Amarillo	Amarillo College	College radio
KAFR	88.3 FM	Willis	American Family Radio	Religious talk (AFR)
KAFX-FM	95.5 FM	Diboll	Townsquare License, LLC	Top 40 (CHR)
KAGA-LP	106.9 FM	San Angelo	Calvary Chapel San Angelo	Religious Teaching
KAGC	1510 AM	Bryan	Bryan Broadcasting License Corporation	Urban adult contemporary
KAGG	96.1 FM	Madisonville	iHM Licenses, LLC	Country
KAGP	89.1 FM	Greenwood	Agape Educational Media, Inc.	Spanish Contemporary Christian
KAGT	90.5 FM	Abilene	Educational Media Foundation	Contemporary worship (Air1)
KAGZ-LP	90.5 FM	College Station	Texas A&M University - College Station	College radio
KAHL	1310 AM	San Antonio	San Antonio Radioworks, LLC	Adult standards
KAHL-FM	105.9 FM	Hondo	San Antonio Radioworks, LLC	Adult standards
KAIQ	95.5 FM	Wolfforth	Entravision Holdings, LLC	Regional Mexican
KAJA	97.3 FM	San Antonio	iHM Licenses, LLC	Country
KAJE	107.3 FM	Ingleside	ICA Radio, Ltd.	Country
KALD	91.9 FM	Caldwell	Houston Christian Broadcasters, Inc.	Christian radio (KHCB-FM)
KALK	97.7 FM	Winfield	East Texas Broadcasting, Inc.	Classic hits
KALP	92.7 FM	Alpine	Alpine Radio, LLC	Country
KAMA	750 AM	El Paso	97.5 Licensee TX, LLC	Spanish News/Talk
KAMA-FM	104.9 FM	Deer Park	Tichenor License Corporation	CHR/Latin Pop
KAML	990 AM	Kenedy-Karnes City	Siga Broadcasting Corp.	Spanish Contemporary Christian
KAMM	1540 AM	University Park	North Texas Radio Group, L.P.	Regional Mexican
KAMT	105.1 FM	Channing	Viva Media, L.L.C.	Tejano
KAMU-FM	90.9 FM	College Station	Texas A&M University	Variety
KAMV	107.1 FM	Benbrook	Tichenor License Corporation	Smooth jazz
KAMX	94.7 FM	Luling	Audacy License, LLC	Hot adult contemporary
KAMY	90.1 FM	Lubbock	Family Life Broadcasting, Inc.	Christian radio (Family Life Radio)
KAMZ	103.5 FM	Tahoka	Albert Benavides	Regional Mexican
KAND	1340 AM	Corsicana	New Century Broadcasting, LLC	Silent
KANI	1500 AM	Wharton	Martin Broadcasting, Inc.	Gospel
KANJ	91.1 FM	Giddings	Houston Christian Broadcasters, Inc.	Christian radio (KHCB-FM)
KAPN	107.3 FM	Caldwell	Brazos Valley Communications, Ltd.	Classic hits
KAPW	99.3 FM	White Oak	Reynolds Radio, Inc.	Regional Mexican
KAQD	91.3 FM	Abilene	American Family Association	Inspirational (AFR)
KARX	107.1 FM	Canyon	Cumulus Licensing LLC	Country
KASE-FM	100.7 FM	Austin	iHM Licenses, LLC	Country
KATG	88.1 FM	Elkhart	American Family Association	Religious talk (AFR)
KATH	910 AM	Frisco	Chatham Hill Foundation, Inc.	Catholic
KATP	101.9 FM	Amarillo	Townsquare License, LLC	Country
KATX	97.7 FM	Eastland	For the Love of the Game Broadcasting, LLC	Classic hits
KAUM	107.1 FM	Colorado City	Extreme Media, LLC	Country
KAVO	90.9 FM	Pampa	American Family Association	Religious talk (AFR)
KAVW	90.7 FM	Amarillo	American Family Association	Inspirational (AFR)
KAVX	91.9 FM	Lufkin	Lufkin Educational Broadcasting Foundation	Religious
KAWA	89.7 FM	Sanger	Hope Media Group	Contemporary Christian
KAWU-LP	97.1 FM	El Paso	Sin Fronteras Organizing Project	Variety
KAWV	88.3 FM	Alice	American Family Association	Religious talk (AFR)
KAXA	103.7 FM	Mountain Home	Jam Broadcasting, LLC	Adult hits
KAXM	90.1 FM	Nacogdoches	Stephen F. Austin State University	College radio
KAYD-FM	101.7 FM	Silsbee	Cumulus Licensing LLC	Country
KAYK	88.5 FM	Victoria	American Family Association	Religious talk (AFR)
KAZE	106.9 FM	Ore City	Reynolds Radio, Inc.	Rhythmic contemporary
KAZI	88.7 FM	Austin	Austin Community Radio	Urban contemporary/Community radio
KBAH	90.5 FM	Plainview	American Family Association	Religious talk (AFR)
KBAR-FM	100.9 FM	Victoria	Victoria Radioworks, LLC	Classic country
KBAT	99.9 FM	Monahans	Townsquare License, LLC	Classic rock
KBBB	102.5 FM	Bay City	Bay and Beyond Broadcasting LLC	Adult contemporary
KBBT	98.5 FM	Schertz	Univision Radio Illinois, Inc.	Rhythmic contemporary
KBBW	1010 AM	Waco	American Broadcasting of Texas	Christian talk
KBCX	91.5 FM	Big Spring	American Family Association	Inspirational (AFR)
KBCY	99.7 FM	Tye	Cumulus Licensing LLC	Country
KBDE	89.9 FM	Temple	American Family Association	Religious talk (AFR)
KBDR	100.5 FM	Mirando City	Leading Media Group Corp.	Regional Mexican
KBDT	1160 AM	Highland Park	Pacific Star Media LLC	Talk
KBEC	1390 AM	Waxahachie	Faye and Richard Tuck, Inc.	Classic Texas country
KBEJ-LP	104.1 FM	Beaumont	Beaumont Iglesia Cristo Viene	Spanish religious
KBEX	96.1 FM	Dalhart	Viva Media, LLC	Regional Mexican
KBEY	103.9 FM	Burnet	Victory Publishing Company, Ltd.	Country
KBFB	97.9 FM	Dallas	Radio One Licenses, LLC	Urban contemporary
KBFM	104.1 FM	Edinburg	iHM Licenses, LLC	Rhythmic contemporary
KBGO	95.7 FM	Waco	iHM Licenses, LLC	Classic hits
KBGT	93.3 FM	Buffalo Gap	Extreme Media, LLC	Tejano
KBHT	1590 AM	Mexia	M&M Broadcasters, Ltd.	Classic country
KBIB	1000 AM	Marion	Hispanic Community College	Spanish religious
KBIC	105.7 FM	Raymondville	Christian Ministries of the Valley	Spanish religious
KBIH-LP	94.1 FM	Houston	Betesda Iglesia Hispana International	Spanish religious
KBJS	90.3 FM	Jacksonville	East Texas Media Association, Inc.	Christian
KBJX	103.5 FM	Mertzon	William W. McCutchen, III	Adult hits (Jack FM)
KBKN	91.3 FM	Lamesa	La Promesa Foundation	Catholic
KBLC	91.5 FM	Fredericksburg	Houston Christian Broadcasters, Inc.	Christian (KHCB-FM)
KBLY	100.5 FM	Newcastle	Positive Radio Network, LLC	Christian
KBLZ	102.7 FM	Winona	S.O. 2,000, LC	Rhythmic contemporary
KBMD	88.5 FM	Marble Falls	La Promesa Foundation	Catholic
KBME	790 AM	Houston	iHM Licenses, LLC	Sports (FSR)
KBMM	89.5 FM	Odessa	American Family Association	Inspirational (AFR)
KBNA-FM	97.5 FM	El Paso	97.5 Licensee TX, LLC	Regional Mexican
KBNG-LP	90.9 FM	Bangs	Bangs Church of Christ	Christian
KBNH-LP	100.7 FM	Brownsville	Generacion de Vision Corporacion	Spanish religious
KBNJ	91.7 FM	Corpus Christi	World Radio Network, Inc.	Christian adult contemporary
KBNL	89.9 FM	Laredo	World Radio Network	Spanish talk
KBNR	88.3 FM	Brownsville	World Radio Network, Inc.	Spanish religious
KBNU	93.9 FM	Uvalde	South Texas Radio, LLC	Silent
KBNX	97.9 FM	Bangs	William W. McCutchen III	Classic hits
KBOC	98.3 FM	Bridgeport	Estrella Radio License of Dallas LLC	Spanish CHR
KBPA	103.5 FM	Austin	Waterloo Media Group, L.P.	Adult hits (Bob FM)
KBPH-LP	94.3 FM	Austin	Austin Cathedral, Inc.	Religious Teaching
KBPM-LP	107.1 FM	Mesquite	Mesquite African American Community	Spanish religious
KBPO	1150 AM	Port Neches	Christian Ministries of the Valley, Inc.	Spanish religious
KBRA	95.9 FM	Freer	Cobra Broadcasting, LLC – KBRA	News/Talk
KBRN	1500 AM	Boerne	Bofars Media Group, LLC	Solid gold hits
KBRQ	102.5 FM	Hillsboro	iHM Licenses, LLC	Active rock
KBRZ	1460 AM	Missouri City	Daij Media, LLC	South Asian
KBRZ-FM	89.3 FM	Victoria	Aleluya Broadcasting Network	Spanish religious
KBSO	94.7 FM	Corpus Christi	Reina Broadcasting Inc.	Classic hits
KBST	1490 AM	Big Spring	Kbest Media, LLC	News/Talk
KBST-FM	95.7 FM	Big Spring	Kbest Media, LLC	Country
KBTD	89.1 FM	Freer	The Worship Center of Kingsville	Spanish religious
KBTE	104.9 FM	Tulia	Alpha Media Licensee LLC	Urban contemporary
KBTP	101.1 FM	Mertzon	Waco Entertainment Group, LLC	Country
KBTQ	96.1 FM	Harlingen	Latino Media Network, LLC	Latin ballad pop
KBTS	94.3 FM	Big Spring	Kbest Media, LLC	Hot adult contemporary
KBUB	90.3 FM	Brownwood	BLM of Brownwood, Inc.	Country gospel
KBUC	102.1 FM	Raymondville	Leading Media Group Corp.	Tejano
KBUG	100.9 FM	Big Spring	Christian Ministries of the Valley, Inc.	Spanish religious
KBUK	104.9 FM	La Grange	KBUK Radio, Inc.	Country
KBUS	101.9 FM	Paris	East Texas Broadcasting, Inc.	Classic rock
KBVP	104.3 FM	Olney	Positive Radio Network, LLC	
KBWC	91.1 FM	Marshall	Wiley University	Urban contemporary
KBWD	1380 AM	Brownwood	Brown County Broadcasting Co.	Adult contemporary
KBXT	101.9 FM	Wixon Valley	Brazos Valley Communications, Ltd.	Urban contemporary
KBXX	97.9 FM	Houston	Radio One Licenses, LLC	Rhythmic contemporary
KBYC	104.5 FM	Markham	Centro Cristiano de Vida Eterna	Spanish religious
KBYG	1400 AM	Big Spring	Weeks Broadcasting, Inc.	Classic hits
KBYH-LP	102.7 FM	Midland	Holy Cross Orthodox Christian Church of Midland and Odessa	Religious Teaching
KBZD	99.7 FM	Amarillo	Grace Community Church of Amarillo	Contemporary Christian (KRBG)
KBZO	1460 AM	Lubbock	Entravision Holdings, LLC	Spanish sports
KBZS	106.3 FM	Wichita Falls	Townsquare License, LLC	Mainstream rock
KCAS	91.5 FM	McCook	Faith Baptist Church Inc	Religious
KCBI	770 AM	Garland	First Dallas Media, Inc.	Christian talk/Brokered
KCBI-FM	90.9 FM	Dallas	First Dallas Media, Inc.	Contemporary Christian
KCBN	102.5 FM	Whitesboro	First Dallas Media, Inc.	Contemporary Christian (KCBI-FM)
KCCE	1340 AM	San Angelo	Houston Christian Broadcasters, Inc.	Christian (KHCB-FM)
KCCG-LP	96.7 FM	Greenville	Church of God-Greenville, TX	Religious Teaching
KCCP-LP	102.3 FM	South Padre Island	Cameron County Texas	Emergency Information
KCCT	1150 AM	Corpus Christi	Radio KCCT, Inc.	Classic Tejano
KCDD	103.7 FM	Hamlin	Cumulus Licensing LLC	Top 40 (CHR)
KCDF-LP	96.1 FM	Houston	Centro Mundial De Fe Inc.	Spanish religious
KCDR-LP	94.3 FM	Austin	Camino Del Rey	Spanish religious
KCEV-LP	106.1 FM	Marshall	Iglesia Cristo Esperanza Viva	Spanish religious
KCGF-LP	100.5 FM	San Angelo	Sunday Morning Glory Radio Inc	Urban gospel/R&B/Smooth Jazz
KCHL	1480 AM	San Antonio	Martin Broadcasting, Inc.	Urban gospel
KCHN	1050 AM	Brookshire	Multicultural Radio Broadcasting Licensee, LLC	Asian
KCHT	99.7 FM	Childress	James G. Boles, Jr.	Sports (ESPN)
KCHX	106.7 FM	Midland	ICA Radio, Ltd.	Regional Mexican
KCJV-LP	97.9 FM	Leon Springs	Hispanic Heritage Radio Network	Oldies
KCKB	104.1 FM	Moran	Positive Radio Network, LLC	Christian talk
KCKL	95.9 FM	Malakoff	HPRN Radio Network, LLC	Country
KCKM	1330 AM	Monahans	Kickin' Country Broadcasting, L.L.C.	Classic country
KCKT	88.5 FM	Crockett	American Family Association	Religious talk (AFR)
KCLE	1460 AM	Burleson	Intelli, LLC	Christian radio
KCLL	100.1 FM	San Angelo	Foster Communications Co., Inc.	Classic hits
KCMC	740 AM	Texarkana	BTC USA Holdings Management Inc.	Sports (ISN)
KCMK-LP	97.3 FM	La Rue	La Rue Educational Christian Broadcasters	Christian (Radio 74 Internationale)
KCMZ	105.5 FM	Ozona	Christian Ministries of the Valley, Inc.	Spanish religious
KCOH	1230 AM	Houston	Pueblo de Galilea, LLC	Urban talk
KCOL-FM	92.5 FM	Groves	iHM Licenses, LLC	Classic hits
KCOM	1550 AM	Comanche	Villecom LLC	Classic country
KCOT	96.3 FM	Cotulla	First FM Cotulla LLC	Regional Mexican
KCOX	1350 AM	Jasper	Cross Texas Media, Inc.	News/Talk
KCPH-LP	99.5 FM	Corpus Christi	South Corpus Christi Hispanic Education Family Fundation	
KCRS	550 AM	Midland	ICA Radio, Ltd.	News/Talk
KCRS-FM	103.3 FM	Midland	ICA Radio, Ltd.	Top 40 (CHR)
KCSA-LP	97.1 FM	San Angelo	Concho Christmas Celebration, Inc.	Oldies
KCTA	1030 AM	Corpus Christi	Broadcasting Corporation of the Southwest	Christian talk
KCTC-LP	98.1 FM	San Antonio	Omega Christian Communications	Spanish religious
KCTI	1450 AM	Gonzales	Texas Public Radio	Public radio
KCTI-FM	88.1 FM	Gonzales	Sun Radio Foundation	Americana
KCTX	1510 AM	Childress	James G. Boles, Jr.	Hot adult contemporary
KCTX-FM	96.1 FM	Childress	James G. Boles, Jr.	Country
KCUN-LP	104.1 FM	Livingston	HGN Music & Education Foundation	Urban/Hip-Hop
KCUS-LP	94.9 FM	Pittsburg	Owl Learning Center	Variety
KCVE-LP	107.3 FM	Conroe	Centro Cristiana de Vida Eterna Conroe Texas	Silent
KCWM	1460 AM	Hondo	Hondo Communications, Inc.	Country
KCXX	103.9 FM	Comanche	William W. McCutchen, III	Classic hits
KCYB-LP	103.5 FM	Cypress	Cypress Broadcasting Club	Variety
KCYL	1450 AM	Lampasas	Ronald K. Witcher	News/Talk
KCYP-LP	97.7 FM	Mission	Intercity Christian Youth Program	Contemporary Christian
KCYR-LP	101.5 FM	Kerrville	Trinity Baptist Church	Contemporary Christian
KCYY	100.3 FM	San Antonio	CMG NY/Texas Radio, LLC	Country
KCZN-LP	105.9 FM	McAllen	Calvary Chapel McAllen Metro	Religious Teaching
KCZO	92.1 FM	Carrizo Springs	Paulino Bernal Evangelism	Spanish religious
KDAE	1590 AM	Sinton	The Worship Center of Kingsville	Spanish religious
KDAV	1590 AM	Lubbock	High Plains Radio Network, Inc.	Regional Mexican
KDCD	92.9 FM	San Angelo	Four R Broadcasting, Inc.	Country
KDCJ	91.5 FM	Kermit	La Promesa Foundation	Catholic
KDDD	800 AM	Dumas	Southwest Media Group – Dumas, LLC	Oldies
KDDD-FM	95.3 FM	Dumas	Southwest Media Group – Dumas, LLC	Classic country
KDDM	100.5 FM	Mount Vernon	North Texas Radio Group, L.P.	Silent
KDEI	1250 AM	Port Arthur	Radio Maria, Inc.	Catholic
KDER	99.3 FM	Comstock	Houston Christian Broadcasters, Inc.	Christian (KHCB-FM)
KDET	930 AM	Center	Center Broadcasting Company, Inc.	News/Talk
KDFM	103.3 FM	Falfurrias	Cantico Nuevo Ministry Inc	Spanish
KDFT	540 AM	Ferris	Way Broadcasting Licensee, LLC	Spanish religious
KDGE	102.1 FM	Fort Worth-Dallas	iHM Licenses, LLC	Adult contemporary
KDHN	1470 AM	Dimmitt	Nancy B. Malone d/b/a ELB Broadcasting	Country
KDIP-LP	98.9 FM	Marfa	The Beach, Unincorporated Nonprofit Association	Religious
KDJW	1010 AM	Amarillo	Catholic Radio of the Texas High Plains	Catholic
KDKR	91.3 FM	Decatur	Penfold Communications, Inc.	Christian
KDKY	91.5 FM	Marathon	Marfa Public Radio	Public radio
KDLI	89.9 FM	Del Rio	American Family Association	Inspirational (AFR)
KDLK-FM	94.1 FM	Del Rio	Suday Investment Group Inc	Country
KDMI-LP	97.5 FM	Canton	St. Therese Catholic Church	Catholic
KDMX	102.9 FM	Dallas	iHM Licenses, LLC	Hot adult contemporary
KDNZ	97.3 FM	Pecos	Route 66 Media, LLC	Classic country
KDOK	1240 AM	Kilgore	Chalk Hill Communications, LLC	Classic hits
KDOL-LP	96.1 FM	Livingston	Lake Livingston Broadcasting	Variety
KDPM	92.3 FM	Marshall	92.3 The Depot LLC	Country
KDRN	1230 AM	Del Rio	Suday Investment Group Inc	Spanish variety
KDRP-LP	103.1 FM	Dripping Springs	Principle Broadcasting Foundation, Inc.	Americana
KDRX	106.9 FM	Laughlin Air Force Base	MBM Radio Del Rio LLC	Country/Tejano
KDRY	1100 AM	Alamo Heights	KDRY Radio, Inc.	Christian Teaching & Preaching
KDVP-LP	99.9 FM	Denton	Iglesia Fuente de Luz Inc.	Spanish religious
KDVY	93.5 FM	Crockett	Houston Christian Broadcasters, Inc.	Christian (KHCB-FM)
KDXX	107.9 FM	Lewisville	Univision Radio San Francisco, Inc.	Spanish CHR
KEAN-FM	105.1 FM	Abilene	Townsquare License, LLC	Country
KEBE	1400 AM	Jacksonville	North Texas Radio Group, L.P.	Silent
KEDA	1540 AM	San Antonio	Claro Communications, Ltd.	Tejano and Conjunto
KEDC	88.5 FM	Hearne	Red-C Apostolate: Religious Education for the Domestic Church	Catholic
KEDT-FM	90.3 FM	Corpus Christi	South Texas Public Broadcasting System, Inc.	Public radio
KEDV	90.3 FM	Brackettville	Christian Ministries of the Valley	Spanish religious
KEEI	94.5 FM	Oakwood	North Texas Radio Group, L.P.	Top 40 (CHR)/Modern adult contemporary
KEEP	103.1 FM	Bandera	Hill Country Broadcasting, LLC	Country (KNAF-FM)
KEES	1430 AM	Gladewater	La Promesa Foundation	Urban gospel
KEFH	99.3 FM	Clarendon	Davis Broadcast Co., Inc.	Classic hits
KEFW-LP	102.5 FM	Fort Worth	North Fort Worth Hispanic Community Church	Spanish religious
KEGL	97.1 FM	Fort Worth	iHM Licenses, LLC	Active rock
KEHH	92.3 FM	Livingston	KSBJ Educational Foundation, Inc.	Contemporary Christian
KEJC-LP	104.1 FM	Dallas	Templo de Dios, Org. 2	Spanish religious
KEKO	101.7 FM	Hebbronville	La Nueva Cadena Radio Luz Incorporated	Spanish Christian
KELG	1440 AM	Manor	Encino Broadcasting, LLC	Spanish Christian
KELI	98.7 FM	San Angelo	Townsquare License, LLC	Top 40 (CHR)
KELP	1590 AM	El Paso	McClatchey Broadcasting, Inc.	Christian
KELT	102.5 FM	Encinal	Mildred Jean Leyendecker, Executor	Contemporary Christian
KELW	95.3 FM	Gilmer	Educational Radio Foundation of East Texas, Inc.	Christian
KEMA	94.5 FM	Three Rivers	S Content Marketing, LLC	Country
KEOM	88.5 FM	Mesquite	Mesquite Independent School District	Classic hits
KEON	94.9 FM	Ganado	S Content Marketing, LLC	Country
KEOS	89.1 FM	College Station	Brazos Educational Radio	Public radio
KEPH-LP	95.3 FM	Friendswood	Calvary Chapel Southeast Houston	Religious Teaching
KEPI	88.7 FM	Eagle Pass	World Radio Network, Inc.	Spanish religious
KEPJ-LP	101.5 FM	San Antonio	Esperanza Peace and Justice Center	Spanish talk
KEPX	89.5 FM	Eagle Pass	World Radio Network, Inc.	Spanish religious
KEQX	89.5 FM	Stephenville	CSSI Non-Profit Educational Broadcasting Corporation	Classic country
KERA	90.1 FM	Dallas	North Texas Public Broadcasting, Inc.	Public radio
KERB-LP	99.9 FM	Grand Prairie	Cpc Of The Wmm-grand Prairie Tx-one Inc.	Religious
KERC-LP	95.3 FM	Kermit	Holy Spirit Oil Filled Ministry	Spanish religious
KERG	104.7 FM	Escobares	Christian Ministries of the Valley, Inc.	Spanish religious
KERV	1230 AM	Kerrville	Jam Broadcasting, LLC	Adult hits
KESO	92.7 FM	South Padre Island	Rio Grande Bible Institute, Inc.	Spanish Christian
KESS	93.3 FM	Port Arthur	Tichenor License Corporation	Norteño
KETE	99.7 FM	Sulphur Bluff	Brazos TV, Inc.,	Christian
KETR	88.9 FM	Commerce	East Texas A&M University	Public radio
KETX	1440 AM	Livingston	Ken Luck	Classic rock
KEWL-FM	95.1 FM	New Boston	American Media Investments Inc.	1990s' Alternative
KEWP	103.5 FM	Uvalde Estates	La Nueva FM Uvalde LLC	Regional Mexican
KEWT-LP	99.1 FM	Weslaco	La Primera Asamblea de Dios	Spanish religious
KEXB	1440 AM	University Park	Relevant Radio, Inc.	Catholic
KEYE	1400 AM	Perryton	Perryton Radio, Inc	Country
KEYE-FM	93.7 FM	Perryton	Perryton Radio, Inc.	Adult contemporary
KEYH	850 AM	Houston	Estrella Radio License of Houston LLC	Regional Mexican
KEYJ-FM	107.9 FM	Abilene	Townsquare License, LLC	Mainstream rock
KEYS	1440 AM	Corpus Christi	Malkan Interactive Communications, LLC	News/Talk
KFAH	99.1 FM	Pineland	James M Lout	Adult contemporary
KFAN-FM	107.9 FM	Johnson City	Hill Country Broadcasting, LLC	Adult album alternative
KFCC-LP	97.9 FM	Mission	El Divino Redentor de Las Asambleas de Dios, Inc.	Spanish religious
KFCD	990 AM	Farmersville	Farmersville Investments, LLC	Spanish religious
KFCE-LP	95.5 FM	Wills Point	FACE Creative Education Inc	Variety
KFCX	106.1 FM	Floydada	Anthony L. Ricketts	Texas country
KFGG-LP	101.9 FM	Marble Falls	Rockpile Church	Contemporary Christian
KFJZ	870 AM	Fort Worth	Siga Broadcasting Corporation	Business News/Talk
KFLB-FM	88.1 FM	Stanton	Family Life Broadcast, Inc	Christian
KFLC	1270 AM	Benbrook	Latino Media Network, LLC	Spanish sports
KFLP	900 AM	Floydada	Anthony L. Ricketts	Texas country
KFMK	105.9 FM	Round Rock	Educational Media Foundation	Christian adult contemporary (K-LOVE)
KFMX-FM	94.5 FM	Lubbock	Townsquare License, LLC	Mainstream rock
KFNC	97.5 FM	Mont Belvieu	Gow Media, LLC	Sports (ESPN)
KFON	93.9 FM	Groveton	North Texas Radio Group, L.P.	Silent
KFRI	88.7 FM	West Odessa	Educational Media Foundation	Contemporary worship (Air1)
KFRO	1370 AM	Longview	RCA Broadcasting, LLC	Classic hits
KFRO-FM	99.7 FM	Cuney	University of Texas at Tyler	Classic hits
KFRQ	94.5 FM	Harlingen	Entravision Holdings, LLC	Classic rock
KFST	860 AM	Fort Stockton	Fort Stockton Radio Co, Inc.	Soft adult contemporary
KFST-FM	94.3 FM	Fort Stockton	Fort Stockton Radio Co, Inc.	Country
KFTG	88.1 FM	Pasadena	Aleluya Broadcasting Network	Spanish religious
KFTW-LP	99.9 FM	Fort Worth	CPC of the WMM - Fort Worth, TX - One Inc.	Religious
KFTX	97.5 FM	Kingsville	Quality Broadcasting Corporation	Country
KFWR	95.9 FM	Jacksboro	LKCM Radio Licenses, L.P.	Texas country
KFXE	96.5 FM	Ingram	Radio Ranch, LLC	Classic rock
KFXR	1190 AM	Dallas	iHM Licenses, LLC	Conservative talk
KFYN-FM	104.3 FM	Detroit	Vision Media Group, Inc.	Country/Red Dirt
KFYO	790 AM	Lubbock	Townsquare License, LLC	News/Talk
KFZN	94.5 FM	Gainesville	Fuzion Dallas, LLC	Spanish Christian
KFZO	99.1 FM	Denton	Latino Media Network, LLC	Regional Mexican
KFZX	102.1 FM	Gardendale	ICA Radio, Ltd.	Classic hits
KGAF	1580 AM	Gainesville	First IV Media, Inc.	Talk/Gold based AC
KGAS	1590 AM	Carthage	Hanszen Broadcasting, Inc.	Sports (ESPN)
KGAS-FM	104.3 FM	Carthage	Hanszen Broadcasting, Inc.	Country
KGBC	1540 AM	Galveston	Siga Broadcasting Corporation	Stunting
KGBT-FM	98.5 FM	McAllen	Latino Media Network, LLC	Regional Mexican
KGBV	90.7 FM	Hardin	Best Media, Inc.	
KGDL	92.1 FM	Trent	CSN International	Religious
KGDQ-LP	96.5 FM	McAllen	South McAllen Hispanic Education Family Foundation	Spanish religious
KGFZ	97.7 FM	Burke	Educational Radio Foundation of East Texas	Spanish Contemporary Christian
KGGB	96.3 FM	Yorktown	Gerald Benavides	Regional Mexican
KGGR	1040 AM	Dallas	MARC Radio Dallas, LLC	Urban gospel
KGHY	88.5 FM	Beaumont	CCS Radio, Inc.	Southern gospel
KGID	96.3 FM	Giddings	Township Media, LLC	Classic country
KGKL	960 AM	San Angelo	Townsquare License, LLC	Sports (ESPN)
KGKL-FM	97.5 FM	San Angelo	Townsquare License, LLC	Country
KGKV	88.1 FM	Doss	Educational Media Foundation	Christian adult contemporary (K-Love)
KGLD	1330 AM	Tyler	Salt of the Earth Broadcasting, Inc.	Gospel
KGLK	107.5 FM	Lake Jackson	CMG NY/Texas Radio, LLC	Classic rock (Simulcast KHPT 106.9)
KGLY	91.3 FM	Tyler	Educational Radio Foundation of East Texas, Inc.	Christian
KGNB	1420 AM	New Braunfels	New Braunfels Communications, Inc.	Country
KGNC	710 AM	Amarillo	Alpha Media Licensee LLC	News/Talk/Sports
KGNC-FM	97.9 FM	Amarillo	Alpha Media Licensee LLC	Country
KGNZ	88.1 FM	Abilene	Christian Broadcasting Co., Inc.	Contemporary Christian
KGOD-LP	94.1 FM	Tenaha	International Missionary Fellowship Inc. (IMF)	Bible Reading
KGOL	1180 AM	Humble	FM Media Ventures LLC	South Asian
KGOW	1560 AM	Bellaire	Gow Media, LLC	Vietnamese
KGPF	91.1 FM	Sulphur Springs	Templo de Dios, Inc. 1	Spanish Catholic
KGPJ-LP	92.9 FM	Grand Prairie	Ministerio Por Gracia de Dios	Spanish religious
KGQD-LP	102.7 FM	Kermit	Kermit Radio Academy	Religious Teaching
KGRO	1230 AM	Pampa	Southwest Media Group – Pampa, LLC	Adult contemporary
KGRW	94.7 FM	Friona	HPRN Networks, LLP	Classic country
KGSR	93.3 FM	Cedar Park	Waterloo Media Group, L.P.	Regional Mexican
KGTN-LP	106.7 FM	Georgetown	Power Radio Corporation	Variety
KGVL	1400 AM	Greenville	E Radio Network, LLC	Sports (ESPN)
KGWB	91.1 FM	Snyder	Scurry County Junior College District	College radio
KGWP	91.1 FM	Pittsburg	Andres Serranos Ministries, Inc.	Spanish religious
KGWU	1400 AM	Uvalde	La Promesa Foundation	Catholic
KGXG-LP	99.3 FM	Victoria	South Victoria Hispanic Education Family Fundation	Silent
KHAV	107.1 FM	Sabinal	35 Communications LLC	Regional Mexican
KHBE	102.1 FM	Big Wells	Organizacion ICC	Spanish religious
KHBR	1560 AM	Hillsboro	KHBR Radio, Inc.	Country
KHBW	91.7 FM	Brownwood	Houston Christian Broadcasters, Inc.	Christian (KHCB-FM)
KHCB	1400 AM	League City	Houston Christian Broadcasters, Inc.	Christian
KHCB-FM	105.7 FM	Houston	Houston Christian Broadcasters, Inc.	Christian
KHCH	1410 AM	Huntsville	Houston Christian Broadcasters, Inc.	Christian (KHCB-FM)
KHCJ	91.9 FM	Jefferson	Houston Christian Broadcasters, Inc.	Christian (KHCB-FM)
KHCP	89.3 FM	Paris	Houston Christian Broadcasters, Inc.	Christian (KHCB-FM)
KHCU	93.1 FM	Concan	Houston Christian Broadcasters, Inc.	Christian (KHCB-FM)
KHDY	1350 AM	Clarksville	American Media Investments Inc.	Classic country
KHDY-FM	98.5 FM	Clarksville	American Media Investments Inc.	Classic country
KHEA-LP	99.5 FM	La Marque	Abundant Life Christian Center of Lamarque Inc	Religious Teaching
KHEM	89.3 FM	Zapata	Radio Bilingue, Inc.	Spanish talk
KHER	94.3 FM	Crystal City	Sylvia Mijares	Tejano
KHEY	1380 AM	El Paso	iHM Licenses, LLC	Sports (FSR)
KHEY-FM	96.3 FM	El Paso	iHM Licenses, LLC	Country
KHFI-FM	96.7 FM	Georgetown	iHM Licenses, LLC	Top 40 (CHR)
KHFN-LP	105.5 FM	Nazareth	Holy Family Parish Radio Committee	Catholic
KHFX	1140 AM	Cleburne	Siga Broadcasting Corp	Spanish Christian
KHFZ	103.1 FM	Pittsburg	Educational Radio Foundation of East Texas, Inc.	Regional Mexican
KHGF-LP	92.5 FM	Houston	Fundacion Arte Catolico Christiano	Spanish religious
KHGV-LP	99.7 FM	Houston	Garden Villas Community Association, Inc.	Variety
KHIA-LP	97.7 FM	Brundage	He's Alive	Religious Teaching
KHIB	88.5 FM	Bastrop	Houston Christian Broadcasters, Inc.	Christian (KHCB-FM)
KHID	88.1 FM	McAllen	Relevant Radio, Inc.	Spanish Catholic
KHIH	99.9 FM	Liberty	KSBJ Educational Foundation, Inc.	Contemporary Christian
KHJK	103.7 FM	La Porte	Educational Media Foundation	Contemporary worship (Air1)
KHJS-LP	99.1 FM	San Antonio	Escuela Radial JS	Spanish hits
KHKS	106.1 FM	Denton	iHM Licenses, LLC	Top 40 (CHR)
KHKV	91.1 FM	Kerrville	Houston Christian Broadcasters, Inc.	Christian (KHCB-FM)
KHKX	99.1 FM	Odessa	Brazos Communications West, LLC	Country
KHKZ	106.3 FM	San Benito	iHM Licenses, LLC	Top 40 (CHR)
KHLB	102.5 FM	Mason	Star Point Broadcasting, LLC	Country
KHLK	104.3 FM	Brownfield	Houston Christian Broadcasters, Inc.	Christian (KHCB-FM)
KHMC	95.9 FM	Goliad	Minerva R. Lopez	Tejano
KHML	91.5 FM	Madisonville	Houston Christian Broadcasters, Inc.	Christian (KHCB-FM)
KHMR	104.3 FM	Lovelady	KM Radio of Lovelady LLC	Contemporary Christian
KHMX	96.5 FM	Houston	Audacy License, LLC	Hot adult contemporary
KHNZ	101.3 FM	Lefors	Route 66 Media, LLC	
KHOS-FM	92.1 FM	Sonora	Tenn-Vol Corp.	Classic country
KHOY	88.1 FM	Laredo	Laredo Catholic Communications, Inc.	Easy listening
KHPO	91.9 FM	Port O'Connor	Houston Christian Broadcasters, Inc.	Christian
KHPS	88.9 FM	Uvalde	Houston Christian Broadcasters, Inc.	Religious
KHPT	106.9 FM	Conroe	CMG NY/Texas Radio, LLC	Classic rock (Simulcast 107.5 KGLK)
KHQR-LP	99.9 FM	Harlingen	Prayer Well Educational Association	Religious Teaching
KHRO	1150 AM	El Paso	Entravision Holdings, LLC	Spanish adult hits (KINT-FM)
KHSB-FM	104.7 FM	Kingsland	Munbilla Broadcasting Properties, Ltd.	Country
KHSE	700 AM	Wylie	Texas FM Radio, LLC	South Asian
KHSP-LP	94.3 FM	Huntsville	Spirit Media Inc	Contemporary Christian
KHSX-LP	101.5 FM	Houston	His Sanctuary Ministries USA International, Inc.	Variety
KHTA	92.5 FM	Wake Village	Houston Christian Broadcasters, Inc.	Christian (KHCB-FM)
KHTW	1300 AM	Lumberton	Carlos Lopez	Tejano
KHUK	106.5 FM	Granite Shoals	River Radio LLC	Smooth jazz
KHVL	1490 AM	Huntsville	HEH Communications, LLC	Classic hits
KHVN	970 AM	Fort Worth	iHM Licenses, LLC	Black-oriented news
KHVT	91.5 FM	Bloomington	Houston Christian Broadcasters, Inc.	Christian (KHCB-FM)
KHVU	91.7 FM	Houston	KSBJ Educational Foundation, Inc.	Spanish Christian adult contemporary
KHXS	102.7 FM	Merkel	Cumulus Licensing LLC	Classic rock
KHYI	95.3 FM	Howe	Metro Broadcasters – Texas, Inc.	Country/Americana
KIDC-LP	94.1 FM	Odessa	Iglesia del Camino, La Verdad, y La Vida, Inc.	Spanish religious
KIIZ-FM	92.3 FM	Killeen	iHM Licenses, LLC	Urban contemporary
KIJN	1060 AM	Farwell	Unido Para Cristo, Inc.	Religious
KIJN-FM	92.3 FM	Farwell	Top O' Texas Educational Broadcasting Foundation, Inc.	Religious
KIKK	650 AM	Pasadena	Audacy License, LLC	Sports gambling (BetQL/ISN)
KIKK-FM	95.7 FM	Houston	Audacy License, LLC	Sports
KIKT	93.5 FM	Cooper	E Radio Network, LLC	Country
KIKZ	1250 AM	Seminole	Gaines County Broadcasting, Ltd.	Adult contemporary
KILE-LP	94.9 FM	North Cleveland	Tarkington Radio Club	
KILT	610 AM	Houston	Audacy License, LLC	Sports (ISN)
KILT-FM	100.3 FM	Houston	Audacy License, LLC	Country
KIMP	960 AM	Mount Pleasant	East Texas Broadcasting, Inc.	Regional Mexican
KIMS-LP	99.9 FM	Weslaco	Open Door Baptist Church	
KINE	1330 AM	Kingsville	Cotton Broadcasting	Spanish religious
KINF-LP	107.9 FM	Palestine	Sacred Heart Catholic Church Parish Council	Catholic
KINL	92.7 FM	Eagle Pass	Moises Abraham Gonzalez	Silent
KINT-FM	93.9 FM	El Paso	Entravision Holdings, LLC	Spanish adult hits
KIOC	106.1 FM	Orange	iHM Licenses, LLC	Mainstream rock
KIOX-FM	96.1 FM	Edna	Bay and Beyond Broadcasting LLC	Country
KIRP-LP	96.1 FM	Sugar Land	Positive Broadcasting Company	Spanish Tropical
KIRT-LP	99.1	Canyon Lake	Stellar Park Inc.	
KISS-FM	99.5 FM	San Antonio	CMG NY/Texas Radio, LLC	Mainstream rock
KISX	107.3 FM	Whitehouse	Townsquare License, LLC	Urban adult contemporary
KISY	92.7 FM	Blossom	Tracy McCutchen	Top 40/CHR
KITE	1410 AM	Victoria	Victoria Radioworks, LLC	Classic hits
KITT	106.5 FM	Meridian	LKCM Radio Licenses, LP	Classic hits
KITY	102.9 FM	Llano	River Radio LLC	Texas Country
KIUN	1400 AM	Pecos	Pecos Radio Co., Inc.	Country
KIVM	91.1 FM	Fredericksburg	La Promesa Foundation	Catholic
KIVY	1290 AM	Crockett	Leon Hunt	Adult standards
KIVY-FM	92.7 FM	Crockett	Leon Hunt	Country
KIXL	970 AM	Del Valle	Relevant Radio, Inc.	Catholic
KIXS	107.9 FM	Victoria	Townsquare License, LLC	Country
KIXT	106.7 FM	Hewitt	Prophecy Media Group, LLC	Classic rock
KIXV	91.5 FM	Muleshoe	New Path Communications	
KIXY-FM	94.7 FM	San Angelo	Foster Communications Company, Inc.	Top 40 (CHR)
KIXZ	940 AM	Amarillo	Townsquare License, LLC	News/Talk
KJAG	107.7 FM	Guthrie	Route 66 Media, LLC	Country
KJAP-LP	97.3 FM	Edinburg	Edingburg Templo Biblico Palabra Vieiente	Spanish religious
KJAS	107.3 FM	Jasper	James M. Lout dba Rayburn Broadcasting, Inc.	Adult contemporary
KJAV	104.9 FM	Alamo	Bi-Media Licensee, LLC	Contemporary Christian
KJAZ	94.1 FM	Point Comfort	S Content Marketing, LLC	Silent
KJBB-LP	94.7 FM	Brownsboro	Brownsboro Independent School District	Community radio
KJBZ	92.7 FM	Laredo	Encarnacion A. Guerra	Regional Mexican
KJCE	1370 AM	Rollingwood	Audacy License, LLC	Talk
KJCS	103.3 FM	Nacogdoches	Bryan Broadcasting Corporation	Classic country
KJDE	100.1 FM	Carbon	Brazos TV, Inc.	Christian
KJDL-FM	105.3 FM	Levelland	Christian Ministries of the Valley, Inc.	Spanish Christian
KJFI-LP	102.5 FM	Houston	Iglesia Mundial de Oracion Inc	Spanish religious
KJFK	1490 AM	Austin	Township Media, LLC	Adult hits (Jack FM)
KJFK-FM	96.3 FM	Llano	Township Media, LLC	Adult hits (Jack FM)
KJHJ-LP	94.9 FM	Conroe	Ministerio de Restauracion	Silent
KJHV-LP	96.3 FM	Killeen	Fish Net Media Inc.	Christian
KJIC	90.5 FM	Santa Fe	Community Radio, Inc.	Country gospel
KJID-LP	92.5 FM	Tyler	Iglesia de Dios Jesucristo Manantiales de Vida	Spanish religious
KJIM	1500 AM	Sherman	Bob Mark Allen Productions, Inc.	Adult standards
KJJB	95.3 FM	Eagle Lake	Centro Cristiano de Vida Eterna	Country
KJJF	88.9 FM	Harlingen	Relevant Radio, Inc.	Spanish Catholic
KJJG-LP	92.5 FM	South Houston	Iglesia Centro de Liberacion	Spanish religious
KJJP	105.7 FM	Amarillo	Kanza Society, Inc.	Public radio
KJJS	103.9 FM	Zapata	Hispanic Target Media Inc.	Regional Mexican
KJKB	106.7 FM	Early	Waco Entertainment Group, LLC	Hot adult contemporary/Adult album alternative
KJKK	100.3 FM	Dallas	Audacy License, LLC	Adult hits (Jack FM)
KJLC-LP	98.3 FM	Crystal City	Centro de Milagros Congregation	Spanish religious
KJMA	89.7 FM	Floresville	La Promesa Foundation	Catholic
KJON	850 AM	Carrollton	Chatham Hill Foundation, Inc.	Spanish Catholic
KJOZ	880 AM	Conroe	Hector Guevara Ministry Corp.	Adult hits
KJRN	88.3 FM	Keene	Southwestern Adventist University	Contemporary Christian
KJRT	88.3 FM	Amarillo	Top O' Texas Educational Broadcasting Foundation	Religious
KJTX	104.5 FM	Jefferson	Wisdom Ministries, Inc.	Gospel
KJUK-LP	97.3 FM	Hooks	American Legion Post	R&B
KJVI	105.7 FM	Robert Lee	Ivan James	Adult contemporary
KJXK	102.7 FM	San Antonio	Alpha Media Licensee, LLC	Adult hits (Bob FM)
KJXP-LP	100.9 FM	Nacogdoches	St. Joseph's Catholic Men's Fellowship	Catholic
KJZX-LP	89.1 FM	Austin	Jazz ATX	Jazz
KKAM	1340 AM	Lubbock	Townsquare License, LLC	News/Talk/Sports
KKBA	92.7 FM	Kingsville	Malkan Interactive Communications, L.L.C.	Active rock
KKBQ	92.9 FM	Pasadena	CMG NY/Texas Radio, LLC	Country
KKCL-FM	98.1 FM	Lorenzo	Townsquare License, LLC	Classic hits
KKCN	103.1 FM	Ballinger	Townsquare License, LLC	Country
KKDA	730 AM	Grand Prairie	SKR Partners, LLC	Korean
KKDA-FM	104.5 FM	Dallas	Service Broadcasting Group, LLC	Urban contemporary
KKDL	93.7 FM	Dilley	Isaac Tellez Evangelistic Ministries Inc	Spanish religious
KKEE	101.3 FM	Centerville	Bryan Broadcasting Licensee Corporation	Contemporary Christian
KKER	88.7 FM	Kerrville	Houston Christian Broadcasters, Inc.	Christian (KHCB-FM)
KKGM	1630 AM	Fort Worth	iHM Licenses, LLC	Black-oriented news
KKGT	95.1 FM	Jacksonville	North Texas Radio Group, L.P.	Adult hits
KKHA	92.5 FM	Markham	Bay and Beyond Broadcasting LLC	Classic hits
KKHT-FM	100.7 FM	Lumberton	Salem Media of Illinois, LLC	Christian
KKLU	90.9 FM	Lubbock	Educational Media Foundation	Christian adult contemporary (K-Love)
KKLY	89.5 FM	El Paso	Educational Media Foundation	Christian adult contemporary (K-Love)
KKMJ-FM	95.5 FM	Austin	Audacy License, LLC	Adult contemporary
KKMY	104.5 FM	Orange	iHM Licenses, LLC	Rhythmic contemporary
KKNM	96.5 FM	Bovina	HPRN Networks, LLP	Silent
KKPN	102.3 FM	Rockport	ICA Radio, Ltd.	Top 40 (CHR)
KKPS	99.5 FM	Brownsville	Entravision Holdings, LLC	Bilingual CHR
KKSA	1260 AM	San Angelo	Foster Communications Company, Inc.	News/Talk
KKTK	1400 AM	Texarkana	E Radio Network, LLC	News/Talk
KKTX	1360 AM	Corpus Christi	iHM Licenses, LLC	News/Talk
KKTX-FM	96.1 FM	Kilgore	Townsquare License, LLC	Classic rock
KKUB	1300 AM	Brownfield	La Promesa Foundation	Spanish religious
KKUS	104.1 FM	Tyler	Alpha Media Licensee LLC	Classic country
KKVI-LP	98.3 FM	Greenville	Gospel American Network	Urban gospel/Jazz
KKVR	106.1 FM	Kerrville	Radio Ranch, LLC	Classic hits
KKWV	88.1 FM	Aransas Pass	American Family Association	Inspirational (AFR)
KKXI-LP	92.3 FM	Mount Pleasant	Alpha Broadcasting Network, Inc.	Spanish religious
KKXT	91.7 FM	Dallas	North Texas Public Broadcasting, Inc.	Adult album alternative
KKYN-FM	106.9 FM	Plainview	High Plains Radio Network, LLC	Country
KKYR-FM	102.5 FM	Texarkana	Townsquare License, LLC	Country
KKYS	104.7 FM	Bryan	iHM Licenses, LLC	Hot adult contemporary
KKYX	680 AM	San Antonio	CMG NY/Texas Radio, LLC	Classic country
KLAK	97.5 FM	Tom Bean	Alpha Media Licensee LLC	Adult contemporary
KLAQ	95.5 FM	El Paso	Townsquare Media of El Paso, Inc.	Mainstream rock
KLAR	1300 AM	Laredo	Faith and Power Communications, Inc.	Spanish Christian
KLAT	1010 AM	Houston	Latino Media Network, LLC	Spanish sports
KLBB-FM	93.7 FM	Lubbock	Ramar Communications, Inc.	Classic hits
KLBD	88.1 FM	Premont	The Worship Center of Kingsville	Spanish Christian
KLBJ	590 AM	Austin	Waterloo Media Group, L.P.	News/Talk
KLBJ-FM	93.7 FM	Austin	Waterloo Media Group, L.P.	Mainstream rock
KLBT	88.1 FM	Beaumont	The King's Musician Educational Foundation, Inc.	Contemporary Christian
KLBY-FM	98.9 FM	Albany	WesTex Towers, Inc.	
KLCT-LP	99.1 FM	Lubbock	Lubbock Christian University	Variety
KLDE	104.9 FM	Eldorado	Tenn-Vol Corp.	Silent
KLDN	88.9 FM	Lufkin	BD Supervisors	Public radio
KLDS	1260 AM	Falfurrias	Sportsradiocc LLC	Religious
KLDU-LP	106.5 FM	Laredo	North Laredo Hispanic Education Family Fundation	
KLEJ-LP	104.1 FM	Fort Worth	Templo de Dios, Inc. 4	Spanish religious
KLEY-FM	95.7 FM	Jourdanton	Alpha Media Licensee, LLC	Tejano
KLFX	107.3 FM	Nolanville	iHM Licenses, LLC	Active rock
KLFZ	102.3 FM	Jacksonville	Educational Radio Foundation of East Texas, Inc.	Spanish Christian
KLGD	106.9 FM	Stamford	Vance Communications, LLC	Tejano
KLGS	89.9 FM	College Station	American Family Association	Religious talk (AFR)
KLHB	105.5 FM	Portland	Starlite Broadcasting	Top 40 (CHR)
KLHG-LP	99.7 FM	Galveston	Iglesia la Hermosa	Spanish religious
KLIF	570 AM	Dallas	KLIF Lico, Inc.	News/Talk
KLIT	93.3 FM	Ranchitos Las Lomas	La Nueva Cadena Radio Luz	Spanish Christian
KLJA	107.7 FM	Georgetown	Univision Radio Illinois, Inc.	Spanish AC
KLJJ-LP	101.5 FM	Spring	The Lion of the Tribe of Judah Ministries	Contemporary Christian
KLKT-LP	107.9 FM	Lockhart	The Lockhart Arts, Music, and Broadcast Education Corporation	Variety
KLKV	99.9 FM	Hunt	Educational Media Foundation	Christian adult contemporary (K-Love)
KLLL-FM	96.3 FM	Lubbock	Alpha Media Licensee LLC	Country
KLLR	91.9 FM	Dripping Springs	Educational Media Foundation	Christian adult contemporary (K-Love)
KLMO-FM	98.9 FM	Dilley	Humberto Lopez dba Dilley Broadcasters	Tejano
KLNA-LP	100.5 FM	Pittsburg	Ministerios Tocando Corazones	Spanish religious
KLNO	94.1 FM	Fort Worth	Univision Radio Illinois, Inc.	Regional Mexican
KLNT	1490 AM	Laredo	Iglesia Cristina Restauración y Vida	Regional Mexican
KLOL	101.1 FM	Houston	Audacy License, LLC	Latin pop
KLOT-LP	107.7 FM	Cat Spring	Austin County Community Communications	Variety
KLOW	98.9 FM	Reno	Vision Media Group, Inc.	Contemporary Christian
KLPF	1180 AM	Midland	La Promesa Foundation	Catholic
KLQB	104.3 FM	Taylor	Univision Radio Illinois, Inc.	Regional Mexican
KLRW	88.5 FM	San Angelo	Educational Media Foundation	Christian adult contemporary (K-Love)
KLSR-FM	105.3 FM	Memphis	Davis Broadcast Co., Inc.	Country
KLTB	89.7 FM	Brownfield	Christian Ministries of the Valley, Inc.	Spanish religious
KLTD	101.7 FM	Temple	Townsquare Media Bloomington License, LLC	Spanish adult hits
KLTG	96.5 FM	Corpus Christi	Starlite Broadcasting	Adult top 40
KLTN	102.9 FM	Houston	Univision Radio Illinois, Inc.	Regional Mexican
KLTO	99.1 FM	Moody	Waco Entertainment Group, LLC	Spanish CHR
KLTP	90.9 FM	San Angelo	Christian Broadcasting Company Inc.	Contemporary Christian
KLTR	94.1 FM	Brenham	Roy E. Henderson	Adult contemporary
KLTW	105.3 FM	Winnie	Educational Media Foundation	Spanish Christian
KLTY	94.9 FM	Arlington	Inspiration Media of Texas, LLC	Contemporary Christian (K-Love)
KLUB	106.9 FM	Bloomington	Townsquare License, LLC	Tejano
KLUP	930 AM	Terrell Hills	Salem Communications Holding Corporation	News/Talk
KLUR	99.9 FM	Wichita Falls	Cumulus Licensing LLC	Country
KLUX	89.5 FM	Robstown	Diocesan Telecommunications Corp.	Catholic
KLVH	97.1 FM	Cleveland	Educational Media Foundation	Contemporary Christian (K-Love)
KLVI	560 AM	Beaumont	iHM Licenses, LLC	News/Talk
KLVL	1480 AM	Pasadena	Siga Broadcasting Corporation	Spanish Christian
KLVQ	1410 AM	Athens	HPRN Radio Network, LLC	Classic hits
KLVT	1230 AM	Levelland	Cute Boots Broadcasting LLC	News/Talk
KLVW	90.5 FM	Odessa	Educational Media Foundation	Christian adult contemporary (K-Love)
KLXK	93.5 FM	Breckenridge	For the Love of the Game Broadcasting, LLC	Country
KLYD	98.9 FM	Snyder	Delbert Foree	Alternative rock
KLZK-FM	107.7 FM	Idalou	Ramar Communications Inc.	Texas country
KLZT	107.1 FM	Bastrop	Waterloo Media Group, L.P.	Regional Mexican
KMAT	105.1 FM	Seadrift	Cordell Communications, Inc.	Religious (Multi Language)
KMAZ-LP	102.5 FM	Houston	Bread of Life, Inc.	Urban gospel/R&B
KMBL	1450 AM	Junction	Tenn-Vol Corp.	Country
KMCM	96.9 FM	Odessa	Brazos Communications West, LLC	Classic hits
KMCU	88.7 FM	Wichita Falls	Cameron University	Public radio
KMDX	106.1 FM	San Angelo	Four R Broadcasting, Inc.	Urban contemporary
KMEO	91.9 FM	Mertzon	American Family Association	Religious Teaching (AFR)
KMFA	89.5 FM	Austin	Capitol Broadcasting Association, Inc	Classical
KMHT	1450 AM	Marshall	Hanszen Broadcast Group, Inc.	Sports (ESPN)
KMHT-FM	103.9 FM	Marshall	Hanszen Broadcast Group, Inc.	Classic country
KMIC	1590 AM	Houston	DAIJ Media, LLC	Spanish religious
KMIL	105.1 FM	Cameron	Centex Broadcasting, LLC	Country
KMIQ	104.9 FM	Robstown	Cotton Broadcasting	Tejano
KMJQ	102.1 FM	Houston	Radio One Licenses, LLC	Urban adult contemporary
KMKB	88.5 FM	Marfa	Casa Vida Corporation	Christian/Variety
KMKT	93.1 FM	Bells	Alpha Media Licensee LLC	Country
KMLR	106.3 FM	Gonzales	Educational Media Foundation	Christian adult contemporary (K-Love)
KMLS	95.5 FM	Miles	Miriam Media, Inc.	Classic country
KMMX	100.3 FM	Tahoka	Alpha Media Licensee LLC	Top 40 (CHR)
KMMZ	101.3 FM	Crane	Permian Basin Broadcasting, LLC	Spanish Norteno
KMND	1510 AM	Midland	Townsquare License, LLC	Sports (FSR)
KMNY	1360 AM	Hurst	Multicultural Radio Broadcasting Licensee, LLC	Spanish
KMOC	89.5 FM	Wichita Falls	Christian Service Foundation, Inc.	Contemporary Christian
KMOO-FM	99.9 FM	Mineola	Hightower Radio, Inc.	Country
KMPN	95.9 FM	Burnet	Houston Christian Broadcasters, Inc.	Religious (KHCB)
KMQX	88.5 FM	Weatherford	Weatherford Community College District	Adult hits
KMRA	91.1 FM	Monahans	Templo Piedra Angular	
KMRK-FM	96.1 FM	Odessa	ICA Radio, Ltd.	Country
KMSN	104.1 FM	Mason	Township Media, LLC	Americana
KMUL-FM	103.1 FM	Muleshoe	Tallgrass Broadcasting, LLC	Country
KMVK	107.5 FM	Fort Worth	Audacy License, LLC	Regional Mexican
KMVL	1220 AM	Madisonville	Leon Hunt	Adult standards
KMVL-FM	100.5 FM	Madisonville	Leon Hunt	Classic country
KMWX	92.5 FM	Abilene	Townsquare License, LLC	Red dirt country
KMXJ-FM	94.1 FM	Amarillo	Townsquare License, LLC	Adult contemporary
KMXO	1500 AM	Merkel	Zacarias Serrato	Spanish
KMXR	93.9 FM	Corpus Christi	iHM Licenses, LLC	Classic hits
KMYB-LP	95.1 FM	Killeen	Killeen Independent School District	Variety
KMYO	95.1 FM	Comfort	Univision Radio Illinois, Inc.	Spanish AC
KMZZ	98.3 FM	Bishop	Claro Communications, Ltd.	Regional Mexican
KNAF	910 AM	Fredericksburg	Hill Country Broadcasting, LLC	Country
KNAF-FM	105.7 FM	Fredericksburg	Hill Country Broadcasting, LLC	Country
KNAL	93.3 FM	Port Lavaca	Victoria Radioworks, LLC	Country
KNAR	89.3 FM	San Angelo	Educational Media Foundation	Contemporary worship (Air1)
KNBT	92.1 FM	New Braunfels	New Braunfels Communications, Inc.	Americana
KNCH	90.1 FM	San Angelo	Texas Tech University	Public radio
KNCN	101.3 FM	Sinton	iHM Licenses, LLC	Active rock
KNCT-FM	91.3 FM	Killeen	Central Texas College	Easy listening
KNDA	102.9 FM	Alice	Encarnacion A. Guerra	Mainstream urban
KNDE	95.1 FM	College Station	Bryan Broadcasting License Corporation	Top 40 (CHR)
KNEL	1490 AM	Brady	Farris Broadcasting, Inc.	Oldies
KNEL-FM	95.3 FM	Brady	Farris Broadcasting, Inc.	Country
KNES	99.1 FM	Fairfield	J & J Communications, Inc.	Country
KNET	1450 AM	Palestine	Zula Com, LLC	Classic hits
KNEX	106.1 FM	Laredo	Leading Media Group Corp.	Top 40 (CHR)
KNFM	92.3 FM	Midland	Townsquare License, LLC	Country
KNFX-FM	99.5 FM	Bryan	iHM Licenses, LLC	Classic rock
KNGO	1480 AM	Dallas	Hammond Broadcasting Group, LLC	Asian/Hindi
KNHP-LP	100.9 FM	Corpus Christi	New Harvest Transformation Center	Silent
KNHR-LP	95.5 FM	Ennis	Evangelistic Messengers Association Church	Religious Teaching
KNIN-FM	92.9 FM	Wichita Falls	Townsquare License, LLC	Top 40 (CHR)
KNJC-LP	99.9 FM	Houston	Nueva Jerusalen Church	Spanish religious
KNLE-FM	88.1 FM	Round Rock	Ixoye Productions, Inc.	Religious, Contemporary Christian
KNLY	91.1 FM	New Waverly	Northwood Hispanic Communication Center	Regional Mexican
KNNK	100.5 FM	Dimmitt	High Plains Radio Network, Inc.	Southern gospel
KNON	89.3 FM	Dallas	Agape Broadcasting Foundation, Inc.	Community, Variety
KNOR	93.7 FM	Krum	Estrella Radio License of Dallas LLC	Regional Mexican
KNPI-LP	100.5 FM	Padre Island	Texas Pelican Media	Variety
KNRB	100.1 FM	Atlanta	Family Worship Center Church, Inc.	Contemporary Christian
KNRG	92.3 FM	New Ulm	Roy E. Henderson TR/AS New Ulm Broadcasting Co.	Americana
KNRX	96.5 FM	Sterling City	Townsquare License, LLC	Mainstream rock
KNTE	101.7 FM	Bay City	Estrella Radio License of Houston LLC	Regional Mexican
KNTH	1070 AM	Houston	Salem Communications Holding Corporation	News/Talk
KNTU	88.1 FM	McKinney	University of North Texas	Alternative rock
KNTX	1410 AM	Bowie	Henderson Broadcasting Company, L.P.	Oldies/Community
KNUE	101.5 FM	Tyler	Townsquare License, LLC	Country
KNUZ	106.1 FM	San Saba	S Content Marketing, LLC	Country
KNVO-FM	101.1 FM	Port Isabel	Entravision Holdings, LLC	Spanish adult hits
KOAU-LP	94.1 FM	Round Rock	Dios Abla Hoy	
KOCQ-LP	102.5 FM	Denton	Organizacion Cristiana La Hermosa Internacional Inc.	Spanish religious
KODA	99.1 FM	Houston	iHM Licenses, LLC	Adult contemporary
KODM	97.9 FM	Odessa	Townsquare License, LLC	Hot adult contemporary
KOFX	92.3 FM	El Paso	Entravision Holdings, LLC	Classic hits
KOGW	90.5 FM	Hartley	Top O' Texas Ed B/casting Foundation	Religious
KOHV-LP	99.5 FM	Houston	Centro Cristiano Mundial Fe y Amor Inc.	
KOIR	88.5 FM	Edinburg	Rio Grande Bible Institute, Inc.	Religious
KOJP	95.3 FM	Presidio	Marfa Public Radio	Public radio
KOKE	1600 AM	Pflugerville	Encino Broadcasting, LLC	Regional Mexican
KOKE-FM	99.3 FM	Thorndale	Genuine Austin Radio, LP	Regional Mexican
KOLE	1340 AM	Port Arthur	Birach Broadcasting Corporation	Brokered
KOLF-LP	100.7 FM	Plainview	Sacred Heart Educational Association	Catholic
KOLI	94.9 FM	Electra	Cumulus Licensing LLC	Texas country
KOLJ	1150 AM	Quanah	James G. Boles, Jr.	Classic country
KOME-FM	95.5 FM	Tolar	LKCM Radio Licenses, LP	Classic hits
KOMX	100.3 FM	Pampa	Southwest Media Group – Pampa, LLC	Country
KONE	101.1 FM	Lubbock	Alpha Media Licensee LLC	Classic rock
KONO	860 AM	San Antonio	CMG NY/Texas Radio, LLC	Business News/talk
KONO-FM	101.1 FM	Helotes	CMG NY/Texas Radio, LLC	Classic hits
KOOC	106.3 FM	Belton	Townsquare Media Bloomington License, LLC	Rhythmic contemporary
KOOI	106.5 FM	Jacksonville	Alpha Media Licensee LLC	Adult hits (Jack FM)
KOOP	91.7 FM	Hornsby	Texas Educational Broadcasting Co-operative, Inc.	Community radio
KOOV	106.9 FM	Kempner	Armor of God Catholic Radio Apostolate	Catholic
KOPY	1070 AM	Alice	Claro Communications, Ltd.	Spanish Christian
KOPY-FM	92.1 FM	Alice	Claro Communications, Ltd.	Tejano
KORA-FM	98.3 FM	Bryan	Brazos Valley Communications, Ltd.	Country
KORG-LP	95.3 FM	Cleveland	Operation Refuge, Inc.	Oldies
KORQ	96.1 FM	Winters	Community Broadcast Partners LLC	Farm/Classic country
KOTX	98.7 FM	Hebbronville	Xavier Entertainment, LLC	Regional Mexican
KOUI	88.3 FM	Mount Pleasant	Joy Christian Ministries	Southern gospel
KOUL	107.7 FM	Agua Dulce	Minerva R. Lopez	Bilingual Rhythmic CHR
KOVE-FM	106.5 FM	Galveston	Univision Radio Illinois, Inc.	Spanish adult hits
KOWJ-LP	101.1 FM	Lufkin	Homer United Pentecostal Church dba Greater Love Tabernacle	
KOWO-LP	104.1 FM	Wimberley	Wimberley Texan Radio	Variety
KOXE	101.3 FM	Brownwood	Brown County Broadcasting Co.	Country
KOYE	96.7 FM	Frankston	Alpha Media Licensee LLC	Regional Mexican
KOYM-LP	99.7 FM	Houston	4ABN	Spanish religious
KOYN	93.9 FM	Paris	East Texas Broadcasting, Inc.	Country
KPAC	88.3 FM	San Antonio	Texas Public Radio	Classical
KPAL	91.3 FM	Palacios	Centro Cristiano de Vida Eterna	Spanish religious
KPAN	860 AM	Hereford	KPAN Broadcasters	Silent
KPAN-FM	106.3 FM	Hereford	KPAN Broadcasters	Silent
KPAS	103.1 FM	Fabens	Algie A. Felder	Christian
KPBC-LP	93.1 FM	Childress	Parkview Baptist Church	Baptist
KPCO-FM	89.9 FM	Cooper	Iglesia Cristiana Ebenezer	Spanish religious
KPDE	91.5 FM	Eden	La Promesa Foundation	Catholic
KPDR	90.3 FM	Wheeler	Top O' Texas Educational Broadcasting Foundation	Religious
KPDW-LP	100.7 FM	Pharr	Iglesia Poder de Dios	Spanish religious
KPEP	106.5 FM	Eldorado	Tenn-Vol Corp.	Classic country
KPET	690 AM	Lamesa	DCB License Sub LLC	Country/News/Talk
KPEZ	102.3 FM	Austin	iHM Licenses, LLC	Rhythmic contemporary
KPFC	91.9 FM	Callisburg	Camp Sweeney	Variety
KPFE-LP	97.1 FM	Corpus Christi	El Evangelio de Jesus	Religious
KPFG-LP	94.9 FM	Pasadena	Centro Cristiano Nuevo Amanecer A.D.	Spanish religious
KPFT	90.1 FM	Houston	Pacifica Foundation, Inc.	Public radio
KPGA	91.9 FM	Morton	Educational Media Foundation	Contemporary worship (Air1)
KPIA-LP	102.5 FM	Huntsville	St. Thomas Educational Association	Catholic
KPIR	1420 AM	Granbury	KPIR Granbury, LLC	Talk
KPIT	91.7 FM	Pittsburg	Holdsworth Educational Media, Inc.	News/Talk/Variety
KPJU-LP	88.9 FM	El Paso	South El Paso Hispanic Education Family Fundation	
KPKO	91.3 FM	Pecos	American Family Association	Inspirational (AFR)
KPLT	1490 AM	Paris	East Texas Broadcasting, Inc.	News/Talk
KPLT-FM	107.7 FM	Paris	East Texas Broadcasting, Inc.	Top 40 (CHR)
KPLU	100.7 FM	Palacios	Centro Cristiano de Vida Eterna	
KPLV	88.7 FM	Corpus Christi	Educational Media Foundation	Christian adult contemporary (K-Love)
KPLX	99.5 FM	Fort Worth	KPLX Lico, Inc.	Country
KPMA-FM	91.9 FM	Archer City	Templo de Dios, Inc. 1	Spanish religious
KPMB	88.5 FM	Plainview	Centro Cristiano de Vida Eterna	Spanish religious
KPPA-LP	107.9 FM	Mexia	Iglesia Jesucristo es mi Refugio de Mexia TX, Inc.	Spanish religious
KPPC-LP	96.9 FM	San Antonio	Alamo Methodist	Classic hits
KPQP	106.1 FM	Panhandle	Hispanic Target Media Inc.	Regional Mexican
KPRC	950 AM	Houston	iHM Licenses, LLC	Talk
KPRF	98.7 FM	Amarillo	Townsquare License, LLC	Classic hits
KPRR	102.1 FM	El Paso	iHM Licenses, LLC	Rhythmic contemporary
KPSM	99.3 FM	Brownwood	BLM of Brownwood, Inc.	Contemporary Christian
KPSO-FM	106.3 FM	Falfurrias	Brooks Broadcasting Corporation	Country
KPTJ	104.5 FM	Grape Creek	La Unica Broadcasting Co.	Latin Mix
KPTX	98.3 FM	Pecos	Pecos Radio Company, Inc.	Adult contemporary
KPUR	1440 AM	Amarillo	Cumulus Licensing LLC	Farm
KPUR-FM	95.7 FM	Claude	Cumulus Licensing LLC	Texas country
KPUS	104.5 FM	Gregory	ICA Radio, Ltd.	Classic rock
KPUY	97.3 FM	Garwood	Centro Cristiano de Vida Eterna	
KPVC-LP	92.1 FM	Dallas	Iglesia Evangelica Vida y Esperanza	Spanish religious
KPVU	91.3 FM	Prairie View	Prairie View A&M University	College radio/Variety/Urban
KPWD	91.7 FM	Lefors	Solid Rock Foundation	Top 40 (CHR)/Adult album alternative
KPWJ	107.7 FM	Kurten	Bryan Broadcasting License Corporation	Contemporary Christian
KPWW	95.9 FM	Hooks	Townsquare License, LLC	Top 40 (CHR)
KPYK	1570 AM	Terrell	Mohnkern Electronics, Inc.	Adult standards
KPYM	106.1 FM	Matagorda	Elohim Group Corporation	Silent
KPYN	900 AM	Atlanta	Freed AM Corp.	News/Talk
KPZX	94.7 FM	Paudcah	Luis E Giraldo	
KQAT-LP	104.9 FM	Hallsville	Hallsville Independent School District	Variety
KQBB	100.5 FM	Center	Center Broadcasting Company, Inc.	Classic country
KQBI	91.7 FM	Encinal	Centro Cristiano de Vida Eterna	Spanish religious
KQBO	107.5 FM	Rio Grande City	Sound Investments Unlimited, Inc.	Spanish
KQBR	99.5 FM	Lubbock	Townsquare License, LLC	Country
KQBT	93.7 FM	Houston	iHM Licenses, LLC	Urban contemporary
KQBU	920 AM	El Paso	97.5 Licensee TX, LLC	Silent
KQBZ	96.9 FM	Brownwood	Tackett-Boazman Broadcasting LP	Silent
KQCI	91.5 FM	Freer	Centro Cristiano de Vida Eterna	Spanish religious
KQDR	107.3 FM	Savoy	Prophecy Radio Group	Top 40 (CHR)
KQEU-LP	101.7 FM	Houston	NTD Public Media	Ethnic/Chinese
KQFX	104.3 FM	Borger	Viva Media, LLC	Regional Mexican
KQFZ-FM	89.1 FM	Valley View	Templo de Dios, Inc. 1	Spanish religious
KQHN	97.3 FM	Waskom	Cumulus Licensing LLC	Hot adult contemporary
KQIZ-FM	93.1 FM	Amarillo	Cumulus Licensing LLC	Rhythmic contemporary
KQLC	90.7 FM	Sealy	Community Radio, Inc.	Religious
KQLM	107.9 FM	Odessa	Stellar Media, Inc.	Spanish
KQMD	88.1 FM	Quemado	Multimedeos Radio Ola	Spanish Contemporary Christian
KQMJ	104.7 FM	Blanket	Tracy McCutchen	Regional Mexican
KQOA	91.1 FM	Morton	La Promesa Foundation	Catholic
KQOS	91.7 FM	Albany	La Promesa Foundation	Catholic
KQPA-FM	91.9 FM	Paris	Iglesia Cristiana Ebenezer	Spanish religious
KQQB	1520 AM	Stockdale	Centro De Adoracion Internacional Co.	Brokered programming
KQQK	107.9 FM	Beaumont	Estrella Radio License of Houston LLC	Regional Mexican
KQRP-LP	92.9 FM	Malakoff	Cedar Creek Educational Broadcasting Corporation	Classic country
KQRX	95.1 FM	Midland	Brazos Communications West, LLC	Alternative rock
KQSA	97.9 FM	Batesville	Carlos Lopez	Conjunto
KQSB-LP	97.3 FM	Paris	Lamar Community Broadcasting	Variety
KQTC	99.5 FM	Christoval	Saver Media, Inc.	Contemporary Christian
KQTX	98.1 FM	Quanah	James G. Boles, Jr.	Classic hits
KQTY-FM	106.7 FM	Borger	Zia Radio Group LLC	Country
KQUE	980 AM	Rosenberg-Richmond	Daij Media, LLC	Spanish religious
KQUE-FM	88.1 FM	Bay City	Aleluya Broadcast Network	Spanish religious
KQUR	94.9 FM	Laredo	Border Broadcasters, Inc.	Spanish CHR
KQVI-FM	89.9 FM	Cedar Lake	Centro Cristiano de Vida Eterna	Spanish religious
KQVT	92.3 FM	Victoria	Townsquare License, LLC	Top 40 (CHR)
KQWF-LP	103.3 FM	Wichita Falls	Wichita Falls Cesar Chavez Foundation	Spanish religious
KQXB	89.9 FM	Breckenridge	CSSI Non-Profit Educational Broadcasting Corp.	Adult hits / Modern adult contemporary
KQXC-FM	103.9 FM	Wichita Falls	Cumulus Licensing LLC	Rhythmic contemporary
KQXE	91.1 FM	Eastland	CSSI Non-Profit Educational Broadcasting Corporation	Classic country
KQXS	89.1 FM	Stephenville	Brazos TV, Inc.	Christian
KQXT-FM	101.9 FM	San Antonio	iHM Licenses, LLC	Adult contemporary
KQXX-FM	105.5 FM	Mission	iHM Licenses, LLC	Top 40 (CHR)
KQXY-FM	94.1 FM	Beaumont	Cumulus Licensing LLC	Top 40 (CHR)
KQXZ	104.9 FM	Richland Springs	QXZ MediaWorks LLC	
KRAF	88.3 FM	Fort Stockton	Christian Television Radio Ministry	Spanish religious
KRBA	1340 AM	Lufkin	Kasa Family Limited Partnership	Country
KRBE	104.1 FM	Houston	Radio License Holding SRC LLC	Adult Top 40 (CHR)
KRBG	88.7 FM	Umbarger	Grace Christian Church of Amarillo, Inc.	Christian
KRBL	105.7 FM	Idalou	Community Broadcast Partners LLC	Texas country
KRBP	88.1 FM	Presidio	Radio Bilingue, Inc.	Spanish Public radio
KRBS-LP	94.9 FM	Brownsville	Templo Shekina Inc.	Spanish religious
KRCM	1380 AM	Shenandoah	Daij Media, LLC	Spanish religious
KRDY	1160 AM	San Antonio	Relevant Radio, Inc.	Catholic
KREH	900 AM	Pecan Grove	Bustos Media Holdings, L.L.C.	Vietnamese
KRER-LP	102.5 FM	Emory	City of Emory Development Corporation	Variety
KREW	1400 AM	Plainview	High Plains Radio Network, LLC	News/Talk
KRFE	580 AM	Lubbock	KRFE Radio, Inc.	News/Talk
KRGE	1290 AM	Weslaco	Christian Ministries of the Valley	Spanish
KRGH	90.9 FM	Holliday	Grace Community Church of Amarillo	Gospel
KRGN-LP	98.5 FM	Killeen	Midessa Broadcasting Limited Partnership	Urban gospel
KRGX	95.1 FM	Rio Grande City	95.1 Investments, LLC	Christian
KRIA	103.9 FM	Plainview	High Plains Radio Network, LLC	Hot adult contemporary
KRIK	100.5 FM	Refugio	Hispanic Target Media	Regional Mexican
KRIO	910 AM	McAllen	Rio Grande Bible Institute, Inc.	Christian
KRIO-FM	97.7 FM	Roma	Rio Grande Bible Institute, Inc.	Christian
KRIX	105.5 FM	Port Isabel	Eduardo Gallegos	Classic rock
KRLD	1080 AM	Dallas	Audacy License, LLC	News
KRLD-FM	105.3 FM	Dallas	Audacy License, LLC	Talk/Sports
KRLY-LP	104.5 FM	Tomball	Rosehill Amateur Radio Club	Variety
KRLH	90.9 FM	Hereford	Educational Media Foundation	Christian adult contemporary (K-Love)
KRME-LP	98.9 FM	College Station	Ministerios de Restauracion Ebenezer	Spanish religious
KRMX	104.9 FM	Bellmead	M&M Broadcasters, Ltd.	Classic country
KRNB	105.7 FM	Decatur	Service Broadcasting Group, LLC	Urban adult contemporary
KRNH	92.3 FM	Kerrville	Radio Ranch, LLC	Country
KRNR	92.7 FM	Goldthwaite	B+ Broadcasting LLC	Country
KROB	1510 AM	Robstown	B Communications Joint Venture	Tejano
KROD	600 AM	El Paso	Townsquare Media of El Paso, Inc.	Sports (ESPN)
KROI	92.1 FM	Seabrook	Radio One Licenses, LLC	Regional Mexican
KROM	92.9 FM	San Antonio	Tichenor License Corporation	Regional Mexican
KROX-FM	101.5 FM	Buda	Waterloo Media Group, L.P.	Alternative rock/Indie rock
KROY	1410 AM	San Saba	Suzanne Henderson	Adult standards
KRPT	92.5 FM	Devine	iHM Licenses, LLC	Classic country
KRQP-LP	95.5 FM	Colleyville	Texas Youth Organization	Spanish hits
KRRG	98.1 FM	Laredo	Encarnacion A. Guerra	Country
KRRH-LP	95.7 FM	Edinburg	Rosalinda C Raabe Ministries	Spanish religious
KRTG	88.3 FM	Carthage	Houston Christian Broadcasters, Inc.	Christian
KRTP	91.7 FM	Alpine	Marfa Public Radio	Public radio
KRTS	93.5 FM	Marfa	Marfa Public Radio Corporation	Public radio
KRTU-FM	91.7 FM	San Antonio	Trinity University	Jazz
KRUN	1400 AM	Ballinger	Graham Brothers Communications, LLC	Country
KRUT-LP	94.9 FM	Houston	Templo de Dios, Org. 3	Spanish religious
KRVA	1600 AM	Cockrell Hill	Lrad Media, LLC	Spanish
KRVA-FM	107.1 FM	Campbell	Racy Properties, LLC	Country
KRVF	106.9 FM	Kerens	LKCM Radio Licenses, L.P.	Country
KRVJ-LP	107.9 FM	Jacksonville	Centro Cristiano de Albanza	Spanish religious
KRVL	94.3 FM	Kerrville	JAM Broadcasting, LLC	Active rock
KRVP	91.5 FM	Falfurrias	La Vos de Dios Comunidad Cristiana, Inc.	Spanish religious
KRVT-LP	99.9 FM	Rancho Viejo	Blaren Multimedia, Inc.	Silent
KRWD	93.3 FM	Muleshoe	Estrella Broadcasting LLC	Classic hits
KRWJ-LP	104.1 FM	Rockwall	Rockwall Radio de la Comunidad	
KRWP	103.3 FM	Pampa	Southwest Media Group – Pampa, LLC	Classic rock
KRWR	92.1 FM	Tyler	ATW Media, LLC	Sports (FSR/ISN)
KRXB	107.1 FM	Beeville	Scarlet Begonia Productions, Inc.	Tejano
KRXT	98.5 FM	Taylor	Cowboy Broadcast Network, LLC	Country
KRYH-LP	104.7 FM	Temple	Power-Up Radio, Inc.	Christian
KRYS-FM	99.1 FM	Corpus Christi	iHM Licenses, LLC	Country
KRZI	1660 AM	Waco	M&M Broadcasters, Ltd.	Sports (ESPN)
KRZU	90.7 FM	Batesville	Radio Bilingue, Inc.	Spanish talk
KSAB	99.9 FM	Robstown	iHM Licenses, LLC	Tejano
KSAG	103.3 FM	Pearsall	Wendolynn Tellez	Spanish Contemporary Christian
KSAH	720 AM	Universal City	Alpha Media Licensee, LLC	Regional Mexican
KSAH-FM	104.1 FM	Pearsall	Alpha Media Licensee, LLC	Regional Mexican
KSAM-FM	101.7 FM	Huntsville	HEH Communications, LLC	Country
KSAO	93.9 FM	San Angelo	Houston Christian Broadcasters, Inc.	Christian
KSAP-LP	96.9 FM	Port Arthur	Truth and Education	Variety
KSAQ	102.3 FM	Charlotte	Creative RF Venture Group LLC	Country
KSAY	88.5 FM	Hamlin	Brazos TV, Inc.	
KSBJ	89.3 FM	Humble	KSBJ Educational Foundation	Contemporary Christian
KSCG-LP	92.9 FM	Campbell	Shady Grove Baptist Church Greenville	Baptist Teaching
KSCH	95.9 FM	Sulphur Springs	East Texas Broadcasting, Inc.	Country
KSCN	96.9 FM	Pittsburg	East Texas Broadcasting, Inc.	Country
KSCK-LP	100.5 FM	Sterling City	Concho Valley Fellowship	Classic country
KSCS	96.3 FM	Fort Worth	Radio License Holdings LLC	Country
KSEJ-LP	106.5 FM	Victoria	Ralph Salazar Victory Ministries	Contemporary Christian
KSEM	106.3 FM	Seminole	Gaines County Broadcasting, LLC	Country
KSEV	700 AM	Tomball	Patrick Broadcasting LP	News/Talk
KSFA	860 AM	Nacogdoches	Townsquare License, LLC	News/Talk
KSGR	91.1 FM	Portland	Calvary Chapel of the Coastlands, Inc.	Religious
KSGS-LP	99.9 FM	Rio Grande City	Benedictine Sisters of the Good Shepherd	Catholic
KSGV-LP	95.5 FM	Seagoville	Seagoville Chamber of Commerce	Classic rock/Country
KSHJ	1430 AM	Houston	La Promesa Foundation	Catholic
KSHU	90.5 FM	Huntsville	Sam Houston State University	Variety
KSIF	91.7 FM	Wellington	La Promesa Foundation	Catholic
KSII	93.1 FM	El Paso	Townsquare Media of El Paso, Inc.	Hot adult contemporary
KSIX	1230 AM	Corpus Christi	Dynamic Media, LLC	Sports
KSJH-LP	102.3 FM	Hart	St. John Nepomucene Parish Radio Committee	Catholic
KSJT-FM	107.5 FM	San Angelo	La Unica Broadcasting Co.	Regional Mexican
KSKY	660 AM	Balch Springs	Bison Media, Inc.	News/Talk
KSLR	630 AM	San Antonio	Salem Media of Texas, Inc.	Christian
KSMG	105.3 FM	Seguin	CMG NY/Texas Radio, LLC	Hot adult contemporary
KSML	1260 AM	Diboll	Kasa Family Limited Partnership	Urban contemporary gospel and urban adult contemporary
KSML-FM	101.9 FM	Huntington	Kasa Family Limited Partnership	Spanish variety
KSNY	1450 AM	Snyder	Snyder Broadcasting Company	Sports (ISN)
KSNY-FM	101.5 FM	Snyder	Snyder Broadcasting Company	Country
KSNZ	92.9 FM	Shamrock	Route 66 Media, LLC	Classic country
KSOG-LP	104.3 FM	Alice	Abundant Life Christian Center Alice	Contemporary Christian
KSOX	1240 AM	Raymondville	Vision Hispana Incorporated Internacional	Spanish religious
KSPF	98.7 FM	Dallas	Audacy License, LLC	Classic hits
KSQX	89.1 FM	Springtown	Brazos TV, Inc.	Christian
KSRB-LP	100.3 FM	Corpus Christi	Solid Rock Worship Center	Christian
KSSL	107.3 FM	Post	Cathy J. Whitten	Classic country
KSSM	103.1 FM	Copperas Cove	Townsquare Media Bloomington License, LLC	Urban adult contemporary
KSST	1230 AM	Sulphur Springs	Racy Properties, LLC	Oldies
KSTV	1510 AM	Stephenville	Villecom LLC	Spanish variety
KSTV-FM	93.1 FM	Dublin	Villecom LLC	Red dirt country
KSTX	89.1 FM	San Antonio	Texas Public Radio	News/Talk
KSVE	1650 AM	El Paso	Entravision Holdings, LLC	Spanish sports
KSWP	90.9 FM	Lufkin	Lufkin Educational Broadcasting Foundation	Contemporary Christian
KSXT	90.3 FM	Smiley	Hispanic Christian Communications	Silent
KSYM-FM	90.1 FM	San Antonio	San Antonio College	Variety
KSZX	105.5 FM	Santa Anna	William W. McCutchen, III	Country
KTAA	90.7 FM	Big Sandy	Community Broadcasting, Inc.	Christian
KTAE	1260 AM	Elgin	Genuine Austin Radio, L.P.	Spanish Classic hits
KTAI	91.1 FM	Kingsville	Texas A&M University–Kingsville	College/Oldies/Country/Hip-Hop/Rock & roll
KTAL-FM	98.1 FM	Texarkana	Alpha Media Licensee LLC	Classic rock
KTAM	1240 AM	Bryan	Brazos Valley Communications, Ltd.	Regional Mexican
KTBB	600 AM	Tyler	ATW Media, LLC	News/Talk/Sports
KTBB-FM	97.5 FM	Troup	ATW Media, LLC	News/Talk
KTBQ	107.7 FM	Nacogdoches	Townsquare License, LLC	Classic rock
KTBZ-FM	94.5 FM	Houston	iHM Licenses, LLC	Alternative rock
KTCG	104.1 FM	Sanger	Radio Brands, Inc.	South Asian
KTCK	1310 AM	Dallas	Radio License Holding SRC LLC	Sports (FSR)
KTCK-FM	96.7 FM	Flower Mound	Radio License Holdings LLC	Sports (FSR)
KTCU-FM	88.7 FM	Fort Worth	Texas Christian University	Variety
KTCX	102.5 FM	Beaumont	Cumulus Licensing LLC	Urban contemporary
KTCY	105.3 FM	Menard	Tracy McCutchen	Country
KTDA	91.7 FM	Dalhart	American Family Association	Religious talk (AFR)
KTDH	89.3 FM	Dalhart	Kanza Society, Inc.	Public radio
KTDR	96.3 FM	Del Rio	MBM Radio Del Rio LLC	Hot adult contemporary
KTEK	1110 AM	Alvin	Relevant Radio, Inc.	Catholic
KTEM	1400 AM	Temple	Townsquare Media Bloomington License, LLC	News/Talk/Sports
KTEP	88.5 FM	El Paso	University of Texas at El Paso	Public radio
KTEX	100.3 FM	Mercedes	iHM Licenses, LLC	Country
KTFB-LP	89.3 FM	Waco	Texas Farm Bureau	Country
KTFM	94.1 FM	Floresville	Alpha Media Licensee, LLC	Sports (ESPN)
KTFS	940 AM	Texarkana	BTC USA Holdings Management Inc.	Sports (ESPN)
KTFW-FM	92.1 FM	Glen Rose	LKCM Radio Licenses, L.P.	Country
KTHN-LP	88.3 FM	Texarkana	Veteran Area Support Group	Variety
KTHP	103.9 FM	Hemphill	Baldridge-Dumas Communications, Inc.	Classic country
KTIM	89.1 FM	Ellinger	Texas Independent Media, Inc.	Variety
KTJK	106.3 FM	Abilene	WesTex Telco, LLC	Adult hits
KTJM	98.5 FM	Port Arthur	Estrella Radio License of Houston LLC	Regional Mexican
KTKO	105.7 FM	Beeville	Beeville Investments, LLC	Red dirt/Texas country
KTKR	760 AM	San Antonio	iHM Licenses, LLC	Sports (FSR)
KTKX	106.7 FM	Terrell Hills	CMG NY/Texas Radio, LLC	Classic rock
KTLH	107.9 FM	Hallsville	Alpha Media Licensee LLC	Regional Mexican
KTLL-LP	95.7 FM	Terrell	Ministerios El Rey Ya Viene	
KTLT	98.1 FM	Anson	Cumulus Licensing LLC	Adult contemporary
KTLZ	89.9 FM	Cuero	The Worship Center of Kingsville	Religious
KTMR	1130 AM	Converse	Siga Broadcasting Corporation	Business News/Talk
KTMU	88.7 FM	Muenster	South Central Oklahoma Christian Broadcasting Inc.	Southern gospel
KTNO	1700 AM	Richardson	Claro Communications, Ltd.	Tejano
KTNZ	1360 AM	Amarillo	Spanish Catholic Radio of the Texas High Plains	Country
KTON	1330 AM	Cameron	M&M Broadcasters, Ltd.	Sports (ESPN)
KTOT	89.5 FM	Spearman	Kanza Society, Inc.	Public radio
KTPD	89.3 FM	Del Rio	Texas Public Radio	Public radio
KTPR	89.9 FM	Stanton	Scurry County Junior College District	News/Talk
KTRG	94.1 FM	Hooks	E Radio Network, LLC	Sports (FSR)
KTRH	740 AM	Houston	iHM Licenses, LLC	News/Talk
KTRL	90.5 FM	Stephenville	Tarleton State University	Public radio
KTRU-LP	96.1 FM	Houston	Rice University	Variety
KTSA	550 AM	San Antonio	Alpha Media Licensee, LLC	News/Talk
KTSM	690 AM	El Paso	iHM Licenses, LLC	News/Talk
KTSM-FM	99.9 FM	El Paso	iHM Licenses, LLC	Adult contemporary
KTSN	1060 AM	Lockhart	Township Media, LLC	Adult album alternative
KTSN-FM	88.9 FM	Blowout	Sun Radio Foundation	Americana
KTSU	90.9 FM	Houston	Texas Southern University	College radio/Jazz
KTSW	89.9 FM	San Marcos	Texas State University	Alternative rock
KTTF-LP	95.3 FM	Tomball	City of Tomball	Variety
KTTU	950 AM	Lubbock	Ramar Communications, Inc.	Sports (ESPN)
KTTU-FM	97.3 FM	New Deal	Ramar Communications, Inc.	Sports (ISN/ESPN/FSR)
KTTX	106.1 FM	Brenham	Tom S. Whitehead, Inc.	Country
KTTY	105.1 FM	New Boston	BTC USA Holdings Management Inc.	Country
KTTZ-FM	89.1 FM	Lubbock	Texas Tech University	Public radio
KTUT	98.9 FM	Crowell	Brazos TV, Inc.	Silent
KTUX	98.9 FM	Carthage	Townsquare License, LLC	Classic rock
KTWF	95.5 FM	Scotland	LKCM Radio Group, L.P.	Classic hits
KTWL	105.3 FM	Hempstead	Roy E. Henderson	Country
KTXB	89.7 FM	Beaumont	Family Stations, Inc.	Christian
KTXG	90.5 FM	Greenville	American Family Association	Religious Teaching (AFR)
KTXF-LP	93.5 FM	Lakehills	USA.radio	Americana
KTXI	90.1 FM	Ingram	Texas Public Radio	News/Talk/Classical
KTXJ-FM	102.7 FM	Jasper	Cross Texas Media, Inc.	Southern gospel
KTXK	91.5 FM	Texarkana	Texarkana College	Public radio
KTXM	99.9 FM	Hallettsville	Kremling Enterprises, Inc.	Country
KTXN-FM	98.7 FM	Victoria	Broadcast Equities Texas Inc.	Adult hits (Jack FM)
KTXO	94.7 FM	Goldsmith	La Hacienda Entertainment, Inc.	Regional Mexican
KTXP	91.5 FM	Bushland	Kanza Society, Inc.	Public radio
KTXT-FM	88.1 FM	Lubbock	Texas Tech University	Public radio
KTXV	890 AM	Mabank	Radio Punjab Dallas LLC	Asian/Chinese
KTXW	1120 AM	Manor	GLG Media, LLC	Christian talk
KTXX-FM	104.9 FM	Bee Cave	Genuine Austin Radio, L.P.	Regional Mexican
KTXZ	1560 AM	West Lake Hills	Encino Broadcasting, LLC	Tejano
KTYK	100.7 FM	Overton	Board Supervisors, Louisiana State University and A&M College	Public radio
KTYL-FM	93.1 FM	Tyler	Townsquare License, LLC	Top 40 (CHR)
KTYR	89.7 FM	Trinity	Aleluya Broadcasting Network	Spanish religious
KTZE-LP	101.3 FM	Kountze	Kountze Church of Christ	Religious Teaching
KUBR	1210 AM	San Juan	Paulino Bernal	Spanish Christian
KUEH-LP	101.5 FM	Yselta del sur Pueblo	Ysleta del sur Pueblo	Classic hits
KUHC	91.5 FM	Stratford	Libertad en Cristo Ministries	Religious
KUHF	88.7 FM	Houston	University of Houston System	Public radio
KUKA	105.9 FM	Driscoll	Claro Communications, Ltd.	Classic country
KULD-LP	92.1 FM	Laredo	Laredo Hispanic Community Church	Spanish religious
KULL	100.7 FM	Abilene	Townsquare License, LLC	Classic hits
KULM-FM	98.3 FM	Columbus	S Content Marketing, LLC	Country
KULP	1390 AM	El Campo	Wharton County Radio, Inc.	Country
KUNO	1400 AM	Corpus Christi	iHM Licenses, LLC	Spanish adult hits
KURV	710 AM	Edinburg	Leading Media Group Corp.	News/Talk
KUSJ	105.5 FM	Harker Heights	Townsquare Media Bloomington License, LLC	Country
KUT	90.5 FM	Austin	University of Texas at Austin	Public radio
KUTX	98.9 FM	Leander	University of Texas at Austin	Adult album alternative
KUVA	102.3 FM	Uvalde	South Texas Radio, LLC	Silent
KUXO	88.5 FM	Marfa	The Tropics, Incorporated	
KUZN	105.9 FM	Centerville	Aleluya Broadcasting Network	Spanish religious
KUZU-LP	92.9 FM	Denton	Real Waves Radio Network	Variety
KVAP-LP	95.5 FM	Port Arthur	Congregacion Cristiana Shalom Inc.	Spanish religious
KVBH	107.5 FM	San Antonio	Tichenor License Corporation	Rhythmic adult contemporary
KVBM-LP	104.7 FM	Killeen	Killeen Seventh Adventist Church School	Christian
KVCE	92.7 FM	Slaton	VCY America, Inc.	Conservative Christian
KVCZ-LP	96.5 FM	Brownsville	Ministerio Cielos de Gloria	Spanish religious
KVDG	90.9 FM	Midland	La Promesa Foundation	Catholic
KVDR	94.7 FM	Brackettville	MBM Radio Brackettville LLC	Christian rock
KVDT	103.3 FM	Allen	VCY America, Inc.	Conservative Christian
KVED	88.1 FM	Vernon	Top O' Texas Educational Broadcasting Foundation	Religious
KVER	91.1 FM	El Paso	World Radio Network, Inc.	Spanish religious
KVET	1300 AM	Austin	iHM Licenses, LLC	Sports (FSR)
KVET-FM	98.1 FM	Austin	iHM Licenses, LLC	Country
KVFE	88.5 FM	Del Rio	World Radio Network, Inc.	Contemporary Christian
KVFM	91.3 FM	Beeville	Centro Cristiano de Vida Eterna	Spanish
KVHI	88.7 FM	Raymondville	Vision Hispana Incorporated Internacional	Spanish religious
KVHJ-LP	93.9 FM	Mission	Templo Pentecostal-Cristo Jesus la Solucion	
KVHL	91.7 FM	Llano	Texas Public Radio	Public radio
KVHR	91.5 FM	Van Horn	American Family Association	Inspirational (AFR)
KVIC	104.7 FM	Victoria	Victoria Radioworks, LLC	Top 40 (CHR)
KVIL	103.7 FM	Highland Park-Dallas	Audacy License, LLC	Alternative rock
KVIO-LP	102.9 FM	Lubbock	Catholic Medical Association of Lubbock	Catholic
KVIV	1340 AM	El Paso	El Paso y Juarez Companerismo-Cristiano	Spanish variety
KVJM	103.1 FM	Hearne	iHM Licenses, LLC	Top 40 (CHR)
KVJS	88.1 FM	Arroyo	Vision Hispana Incorporated Internacional	Christian
KVJY	840 AM	Pharr	Daij Media, LLC	Spanish Christian
KVLF	1240 AM	Alpine	Alpine Radio, LLC	Classic hits
KVLG	1570 AM	La Grange	KBUK Radio, Inc.	Country
KVLJ-LP	99.5 FM	Victoria	Victoria Texas Community Radio	Spanish religious
KVLL-FM	94.7 FM	Wells	Townsquare License, LLC	Classic hits
KVLM	104.7 FM	Tarzan	VCY America, Inc.	Conservative Christian
KVLR	92.5 FM	Sunset Valley	Educational Media Foundation	Christian adult contemporary (K-Love)
KVLT	88.5 FM	Temple	Educational Media Foundation	Christian adult contemporary (K-Love)
KVLU	91.3 FM	Beaumont	Lamar University	Public/College
KVLW	88.1 FM	Gatesville	Educational Media Foundation	Christian adult contemporary (K-Love)
KVLX	103.9 FM	Franklin	Educational Media Foundation	Christian adult contemporary (K-Love)
KVLY	107.9 FM	Edinburg	Entravision Holdings, LLC	Adult contemporary
KVMC	1320 AM	Colorado City	Extreme Media, LLC	Country
KVMK	100.9 FM	Wheelock	Bryan Broadcasting License Corporation	Texas and red dirt country
KVMV	96.9 FM	McAllen	World Radio Network	Religious
KVNE	89.5 FM	Tyler	Educational Radio Foundation of East Texas, Inc.	Christian
KVNN	1340 AM	Victoria	Victoria Radioworks, LLC	News/Talk
KVNS	1700 AM	Brownsville	iHM Licenses, LLC	Sports (FSR)
KVOP	1090 AM	Plainview	High Plains Radio Network, LLC	News/Talk
KVOU-FM	104.9 FM	Uvalde	Moises Abraham Gonzalez	Silent
KVOZ	890 AM	Del Mar Hills	Consolidated Radio	Spanish Christian
KVRG	89.7 FM	Chillicothe	Solid Rock Foundation	
KVRL-LP	92.7 FM	Longview	Vidas Revolucionadas	Spanish religious
KVRP	1400 AM	Stamford	1 Chronicles 14, L.P.	Contemporary Christian
KVRP-FM	97.1 FM	Haskell	1 Chronicles 14, L.P.	Country
KVRT	90.7 FM	Victoria	South Texas Public Broadcasting System, Inc.	Public radio
KVRX	91.7 FM	Austin	The University of Texas at Austin	Freeform
KVST	99.7 FM	Huntsville	New Wavo Communication Group, Inc.	Country
KVTT	1110 AM	Mineral Wells	Decatur Media Land, LLC	Asian
KVUD	89.5 FM	Bay City	KSBJ Educational Foundation	Spanish Christian adult contemporary
KVUJ	91.1 FM	Lake Jackson	KSBJ Educational Foundation	Spanish Christian adult contemporary
KVVO-LP	94.1 FM	Abilene	Wildfire Global Church	Christian country
KVVT-LP	95.1 FM	Sulphur Springs	Centro de Adoracion	Spanish religious
KVWC	1490 AM	Vernon	HPRN Network, LLC	Full service
KVWC-FM	103.1 FM	Vernon	HPRN Network, LLC	Country/Farm
KVWE	102.9 FM	Amarillo	Alpha Media Licensee LLC	Sports (ESPN)
KVWR-LP	95.5 FM	Dallas	Warning Radio	Urban gospel/R&B
KWAA	88.9 FM	Mart	Educational Media Foundation	Contemporary worship (Air1)
KWAS	88.1 FM	Borger	Top O' Texas Educational Broadcasting Foundation	Religious
KWBC	1550 AM	College Station	Bryan Broadcasting License Corporation	Country
KWBF	1420 AM	Lubbock	Flores Communications, LLC	Classic country
KWBT	94.5 FM	Waco	Kennelwood Radio, LLC	Regional Mexican
KWBU-FM	103.3 FM	Waco	Brazos Valley Public Broadcasting Foundation	Public radio
KWBY-FM	98.5 FM	Ranger	For the Love of the Game Broadcasting, LLC	Country
KWED	1580 AM	Seguin	Guadalupe Media, Ltd.	Country
KWEL	1070 AM	Midland	CDA Broadcasting, Inc.	News/Talk
KWFB	100.9 FM	Holliday	KIXC-FM L.L.C.	Adult hits
KWFG-FM	106.5 FM	Knox CIty	Mekaddesh Group Corporation	Top 40 (CHR)/Hot AC/Adult album alternative
KWFR	101.9 FM	San Angelo	Foster Communications, Inc.	Classic rock
KWFS	1290 AM	Wichita Falls	Townsquare License, LLC	News/Talk
KWFS-FM	102.3 FM	Wichita Falls	Townsquare License, LLC	Country
KWGR-LP	102.9 FM	Wichita Falls	Wichita Falls Hispanic American Family Foundation	
KWHI	1280 AM	Brenham	Tom S. Whitehead, Inc.	Full service
KWJB	1510 AM	Canton	Butler7Media, LLC	Full service Classic hits/AC
KWJV-LP	103.7 FM	Weslaco	Mid Valley Assembly	Contemporary Christian
KWKC	1340 AM	Abilene	WesTex Telco, LLC	Sports (FSR)
KWKQ	94.7 FM	Graham	For the Love of the Game Broadcasting, LLC	Classic rock
KWLD	91.5 FM	Plainview	Wayland Baptist University	Contemporary Christian
KWMC	1490 AM	Del Rio	Minerva Garza Valdez	Classic hits
KWMD-LP	94.9 FM	Weslaco	The South Texas Conjunto Association,inc	Variety
KWMF	1380 AM	Pleasanton	Virgen de Guadalupe Global Communications, LLC	Catholic
KWMJ	100.7 FM	Cotulla	Portelse LLC	
KWNS	104.7 FM	Winnsboro	Lottie L. Foster	Southern gospel
KWOJ-LP	102.5 FM	San Angelo	9th and Main Church of Christ	Religious Teaching
KWOW	104.1 FM	Clifton	Waco Entertainment Group, LLC	Regional Mexican
KWPW	107.9 FM	Robinson	Waco Entertainment Group, LLC	Classic country
KWRA-LP	96.7 FM	Waco	Amistad Baptist Church	Spanish Baptist
KWRD	1470 AM	Henderson	Zula Com, LLC	Classic country
KWRD-FM	100.7 FM	Highland Village	Inspiration Media of Texas, L.L.C.	Christian talk
KWSK-LP	95.7 FM	Cason	KWS Broadcasting Educational Foundation, Inc.	Variety
KWSP-LP	104.9 FM	Kerrville	Home Town Communication, Inc.	Adult contemporary / Smooth jazz
KWTS	91.1 FM	Canyon	West Texas A&M University	1990s music
KWTX	1230 AM	Waco	iHM Licenses, LLC	News/Talk
KWTX-FM	97.5 FM	Waco	iHM Licenses, LLC	Top 40 (CHR)
KWUP	92.5 FM	Navasota	KSBJ Educational Foundation	Contemporary Christian
KWVH-LP	94.3 FM	Wimberley	Wimberley Valley Radio	Variety
KWWD	91.3 FM	Canadian	The River Ministries, Inc.	Religious
KWWJ	1360 AM	Baytown	Salt of the Earth Broadcasting, Inc.	Urban gospel
KWXW	93.7 FM	Kermit	Kyros Media Corp.	Silent
KWYU	96.9 FM	Christine	Rufus Resources, LLC	Classic country
KXAF	97.9 FM	George West	Hispanic Target Media Inc.	Regional Mexican
KXAI	103.7 FM	Odem	Educational Media Foundation	Contemporary worship (Air1)
KXAQ-LP	101.5 FM	Liberty	Hwy 90 Church of Christ	Variety
KXBJ	96.9 FM	El Campo	KSBJ Educational Foundation	Contemporary Christian
KXBT	88.1 FM	Somerville	The University of Texas at Austin	Public radio
KXCS	105.5 FM	Coahoma	Weeks Broadcasting, Inc.	Christian
KXDE-LP	92.1 FM	Denton	Mision Templo Bethel Inc.	Spanish religious
KXDJ	98.3 FM	Spearman	Chris Samples Broadcasting	Country
KXEP-LP	101.5 FM	San Antonio	Martinez Street Women's Center	Variety
KXEZ	92.1 FM	Farmersville	Metro Broadcasters – Texas, Inc.	Country
KXGL	100.9 FM	Amarillo	Alpha Media Licensee LLC	Classic hits
KXHM	106.1 FM	Refugio	Hispanic Target Media Inc.	
KXIQ-LP	105.1 FM	Brownsville	Brownsville Society for the Performing Arts, Inc.	Variety
KXIT	1240 AM	Dalhart	Rogco Family I, LLC	Classic rock
KXJT	88.3 FM	Rio Grande City	Radio Bilingue, Inc.	Variety
KXLV	89.1 FM	Amarillo	Educational Media Foundation	Christian adult contemporary (K-Love)
KXNZ	98.9 FM	Wheeler	Route 66 Media, LLC	Classic rock
KXOI	810 AM	Crane	Hispanic Family Christian network, Inc.	Spanish
KXOX	1240 AM	Sweetwater	Stein Broadcasting Co, Inc.	Country
KXOX-FM	96.7 FM	Sweetwater	Stein Broadcasting Co., Inc.	Country
KXPE-LP	89.9 FM	Austin	North Austin Community Media	Variety
KXQJ	90.1 FM	Clarksville	Fellowship Baptist Church of Blossom, Texas	Baptist
KXQT	105.9 FM	Stanton	Permian Basin Broadcasting, LLC	Silent
KXRI	91.9 FM	Amarillo	Educational Media Foundation	Contemporary worship (Air1)
KXSS-FM	96.9 FM	Amarillo	Townsquare License, LLC	Top 40 (CHR)
KXTJ-LP	96.9 FM	San Antonio	San Antonio Public Safety Alliance	Classic hits
KXTM	94.3 FM	Benavides	Ernest R. Lopez	Tejano
KXTN	1350 AM	San Antonio	Latino Media Network, LLC	Tejano
KXTQ-FM	106.5 FM	Lubbock	Barton Broadcasting Company	Tejano
KXTR-LP	100.7 FM	Stephenville	Tarleton State University	Adult album alternative
KXVI-LP	94.3 FM	Winfield	Iglesia America Para Cristo, Inc.	Spanish religious
KXVR-LP	107.9 FM	Corpus Christi	Comunidad Cristiana of Corpus Christi	Spanish religious
KXVX-LP	99.1 FM	Sulphur Springs	New Life Media Ministries, Inc.	Religious Teaching
KXWF-LP	107.9 FM	Wichita Falls	Comunidad Cristiana of Wichita Falls	Spanish religious
KXWT	91.3 FM	Odessa	Marfa Public Radio	Public radio
KXXE	92.5 FM	San Augustine	Center Broadcasting Company, Inc.	Country/Regional Mexican
KXXM	96.1 FM	San Antonio	iHM Licenses, LLC	Bilingual AC
KXXN	97.5 FM	Iowa Park	KIXC-FM, LLC	Classic country
KXXU	104.3 FM	Santa Anna	William W. McCutchen, III	Top 40 (CHR)
KXYL	1240 AM	Brownwood	Tackett-Boazman Broadcasting LP	News/Talk
KXYL-FM	102.3 FM	Coleman	Tackett-Boazman Broadcasting LP	News/Talk
KXYZ	1320 AM	Houston	iHM Licenses, LLC	Black-oriented news
KXZX-LP	106.5 FM	Juilliard	Comunidad Cristiana of Amarillo	Spanish religious
KXZY-LP	100.7 FM	Waco	Primera Asamblea de Dios	Spanish Pentecostal
KYAB-LP	97.5 FM	Abilene	Abilene Hispanic Community Radio	
KYAR	98.3 FM	Lorena	Red-C Apostolate	Catholic/EWTN
KYBI	100.1 FM	Lufkin	Kasa Family Limited Partnership	Country
KYBS-LP	99.9 FM	Balch Springs	Balch Springs Radio de la Comunidad	Urban gospel/Jazz
KYBY-LP	103.5 FM	Montgomery	Backyard Radio Inc	Variety
KYCL-FM	88.9 FM	Clarendon	Templo de Dios, Inc. 1	Spanish religious
KYDA	101.7 FM	Azle	Educational Media Foundation	Contemporary worship (Air1)
KYEB-LP	107.1 FM	Garland	Iglesia Alfa y Omega	Spanish religious
KYEP-LP	89.9 FM	Eagle Pass	North Eagle Pass Hispanic Education Family Fundation	
KYFA-FM	91.5 FM	Ginger	Central Park Church of God	Spanish religious
KYFB	91.5 FM	Denison	Bible Broadcasting Network, Inc.	Conservative religious
KYFP	89.1 FM	Palestine	Bible Broadcasting Network, Inc.	Conservative religious
KYFS	90.9 FM	San Antonio	Bible Broadcasting Network, Inc.	Conservative religious
KYJC	91.3 FM	Commerce	Penfold Communications, Inc.	Christian talk
KYKK	93.5 FM	Junction	Tenn-Vol Corp.	Country
KYKM	94.3 FM	Yoakum	Kremling Enterprises, Inc.	Country
KYKR	95.1 FM	Beaumont	iHM Licenses, LLC	Country
KYKS	105.1 FM	Lufkin	Townsquare License, LLC	Country
KYKX	105.7 FM	Longview	Alpha Media Licensee LLC	Country
KYLP-LP	101.5 FM	Greenville	Iglesia Cristiana Ebenezer of Greenville, TX	Spanish religious
KYLR	92.1 FM	Hutto	Educational Media Foundation	Christian adult contemporary (K-Love)
KYNC-LP	95.7 FM	Sachse	Iglesia Casa de Oracion y Alabanza AG	Spanish religious
KYND	1520 AM	Cypress	El Sembrador Ministries	Spanish Christian
KYOD-LP	93.7 FM	Odessa	North Odessa Hispanic Education Family Fundation	
KYOK	1140 AM	Conroe	Martin Broadcasting, Inc.	Urban gospel
KYOX	94.3 FM	Comanche	Villecom LLC	Country
KYQX	89.5 FM	Weatherford	CSSI Non-Profit Educational Broadcasting Corporation	Classic country
KYRE-LP	104.1 FM	Mansfield	St. Jude Catholic Church	Catholic
KYRK	106.5 FM	Taft	Withers Family Texas Holdings, LP	Alternative rock
KYRQ	90.3 FM	Natalia	St. Jude Broadcasting	Religious
KYRT	97.9 FM	Hunt	La Promesa Foundation	Catholic
KYSE	94.7 FM	El Paso	Entravision Holdings, LLC	Regional Mexican
KYST	920 AM	Texas City	Hispanic Broadcasting, Inc.	Spanish News/Information/Sports
KYTM	99.3 FM	Corrigan	Family Worship Center Church, Inc.	Religious
KYTY	810 AM	Somerset	Maranatha Broadcasting, Inc.	Religious
KYWW	1530 AM	Harlingen	Latino Media Network, LLC	Spanish sports
KYXX	94.3 FM	Ozona	Tenn-Vol Corp.	Classic country
KYYE-LP	92.9 FM	Garland	Iglesia Cristiana el Rey ya Viene	Spanish religious
KYYI	104.7 FM	Burkburnett	Cumulus Licensing LLC	Classic rock
KYYK	98.3 FM	Palestine	Zula Com, LLC	Country/Texas Country
KYYW	1470 AM	Abilene	Townsquare License, LLC	News/Talk
KYZS	1490 AM	Tyler	Chalk Hill Communications, LLC	Classic hits
KZAH	99.1 FM	Harper	Jam Broadcasting, LLC	Red dirt country
KZAI	103.7 FM	Balcones Heights	Educational Media Foundation	Contemporary worship (Air1)
KZAM	98.7 FM	Pleasant Valley	Mekaddesh Group Corporation	Regional Mexican
KZAR	97.7 FM	McQueeney	Educational Media Foundation	Contemporary worship (Air1)
KZBH	107.7 FM	Hico	First Dallas Media, Inc.	Contemporary Christian (KCBI-FM)
KZBI	92.9 FM	Marlin	First Dallas Media, Inc.	Contemporary Christian (KCBI-FM)
KZBT	93.3 FM	Midland	Townsquare License, LLC	Rhythmic contemporary
KZCC-LP	106.1 FM	Conroe	City of Conroe	Variety
KZCL-LP	101.5 FM	Cleveland	Cleveland Independent School District	Variety
KZCV-LP	103.3 FM	Baytown	Iglesia Cristo Viene of Baytown, Inc.	Spanish religious
KZCW-LP	104.5 FM	Conroe	City of Conroe	Variety
KZDC	1250 AM	San Antonio	Alpha Media Licensee, LLC	Sports (ESPN)
KZEE	1220 AM	Weatherford	Tarrant Radio Broadcasting, Inc.	South Asian
KZEP-FM	104.5 FM	San Antonio	iHM Licenses, LLC	Spanish CHR
KZES-FM	91.3 FM	Estelline	Templo de Dios, Inc. 1	Spanish religious
KZFM	95.5 FM	Corpus Christi	Malkan Interactive Communications, L.L.C.	Rhythmic contemporary
KZFT	90.5 FM	Fannett	American Family Association	Inspirational (AFR)
KZGP-LP	104.1 FM	Grand Prairie	Fundacion Esperanza Viva	
KZHN	1250 AM	Paris	Larry Ryan d/b/a Eifel Tower Broadcasting	Classic country
KZIC	89.9 FM	Hondo	Centro Cristiano de Vida Eterna	Spanish religious
KZII-FM	102.5 FM	Lubbock	Townsquare License, LLC	Top 40 (CHR)
KZIP	1310 AM	Amarillo	Christian Ministries of the Valley, Inc.	Regional Mexican
KZKL	90.5 FM	Wichita Falls	Educational Media Foundation	Christian adult contemporary (K-Love)
KZKV	103.1 FM	Karnes City	Educational Media Foundation	Christian adult contemporary (K-Love)
KZLD-LP	95.3 FM	Houston	Iglesia Fe y Amor de Dios Inc.	Spanish Catholic
KZLH-LP	95.7 FM	Zapata	Zapata Life and Health Radio	Christian
KZLO	88.7 FM	Kilgore	Educational Media Foundation	Christian adult contemporary (K-Love)
KZLV	91.3 FM	Lytle	Educational Media Foundation	Christian adult contemporary (K-Love)
KZMP-FM	104.9 FM	Pilot Point	Perfect Media Group, LLC	South Asian music
KZNE	1150 AM	College Station	Bryan Broadcasting License Corporation	Sports (ESPN)
KZNX	1530 AM	Creedmoor	America Telecommunications Group, Inc.	Spanish religious
KZOA-LP	99.9 FM	Mission	La Respuesta Church Ministries	Spanish religious
KZPL	105.1 FM	Encinal	Protelse LLC	
KZPS	92.5 FM	Dallas	iHM Licenses, LLC	Classic rock
KZQA-LP	100.1 FM	Amarillo	North Amarillo Hispanic Education Family Foundation	
KZQB-LP	104.7 FM	Brownsville	Amor Community Center, Inc.	Spanish religious
KZQQ	1560 AM	Abilene	WesTex Telco, LLC	News/Talk
KZQX	100.3 FM	Tatum	Chalk Hill Communications LLC	Oldies/Adult standards
KZRB	103.5 FM	New Boston	B & H Broadcasting Systems, Inc.	Urban contemporary
KZRF-FM	91.9 FM	Sulphur Springs	Templo de Dios, Inc. 1	Spanish religious
KZRK-FM	107.9 FM	Canyon	Cumulus Licensing LLC	Active rock
KZSM-LP	103.1 FM	San Marcos	San Marcos Texas Community Radio Association	Variety
KZTO-LP	107.3 FM	Burnet	Jesucristo La Roca Viva	Spanish religious
KZTX	91.1 FM	Encino	The Worship Center of Kingsville	Spanish religious
KZWF-LP	93.5 FM	Wichita Falls	Family Christian Radio of Wichita	
KZWL	94.3 FM	Bullard	Educational Radio Foundation of East Texas, Inc.	Christian
KZXL	96.3 FM	Hudson	Pentagon Communications, LLC	Urban adult contemporary
KZYw-LP	106.5 FM	Seagoville	Iglesia de Cristo Kadosh.	Spanish religious
KZYY-LP	93.7 FM	Tyler	Ministerio de Dios Pentecostal	Spanish Pentecostal
KZZA	106.7 FM	Muenster	Estrella Radio License of Dallas LLC	Regional Mexican
KZZB	990 AM	Beaumont	Martin Broadcasting, Inc.	Gospel
KZZM	101.7 FM	Mason	Star Point Broadcasting, LLC	Country
KZZN	1490 AM	Littlefield	HPRN	Classic country
WACO-FM	99.9 FM	Waco	iHM Licenses, LLC	Country
WBAP	820 AM	Fort Worth	Radio License Holdings LLC	News/Talk
WBAP-FM	93.3 FM	Haltom City	Radio License Holding SRC LLC	News/Talk
WOAI	1200 AM	San Antonio	iHM Licenses, LLC	News/Talk
WRR	101.1 FM	Dallas	City of Dallas, Texas	Classical
WTAW	1620 AM	College Station	Bryan Broadcasting License Corporation	News/Talk
WTAW-FM	103.5 FM	Buffalo	Bryan Broadcasting License Corporation	Country

== Defunct ==
- KAMY
- KBAL-FM
- KBED
- KBEN
- KBQQ
- KCAF-FM
- KCER-LP
- KCLW
- KEHM
- KEPS
- KERB-FM
- KFLB
- KFYN
- KGWT
- KHMZ
- KIBL
- KIBQ
- KICA-FM
- KIKR
- KJNZ
- KJOJ-FM
- KLBW
- KMFR
- KMPI
- KMUL
- KM2XVL
- KNSH
- KOGT
- KOPE
- KOTY
- KOZA
- KPHS
- KPQG
- KPRO
- KQBQ
- KQHM
- KQTY
- KRHC
- KRMY
- KROO
- KSEY
- KSEY-FM
- KSLI
- KSTA
- KSTB
- KSWA
- KTER
- KTLU
- KTNO
- KUFA
- KULF
- KVWG-FM
- KXAL-LP
- KXAM
- KXFS
- KXGC-FM
- KXPL
- KZSP
- KOER-LP
- KIRT

== See also ==
- Texas media
  - List of newspapers in Texas
  - List of television stations in Texas
  - Media of cities in Texas: Abilene, Amarillo, Austin, Beaumont, Brownsville, Dallas, Denton, El Paso, Fort Worth, Houston, Killeen, Laredo, Lubbock, McAllen, McKinney, Midland, Odessa, San Antonio, Waco, Wichita Falls
- Texas DX Society (ham radio)

== Bibliography ==
- Alicoate, Jack, ed. (1939), "Texas", Radio Annual, New York: Radio Daily, OCLC 2459636 – via Internet Archive
- "AM Stations in the U.S.: Texas", Radio Annual Television Year Book, New York: Radio Television Daily, 1963, OCLC 10512375 – via Internet Archive

== Images ==
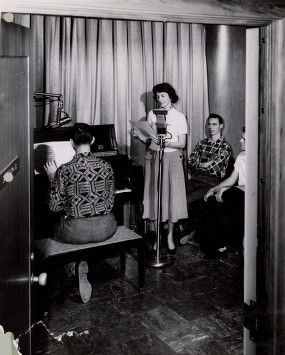
KUHT radio, Houston, Texas, circa 1950s

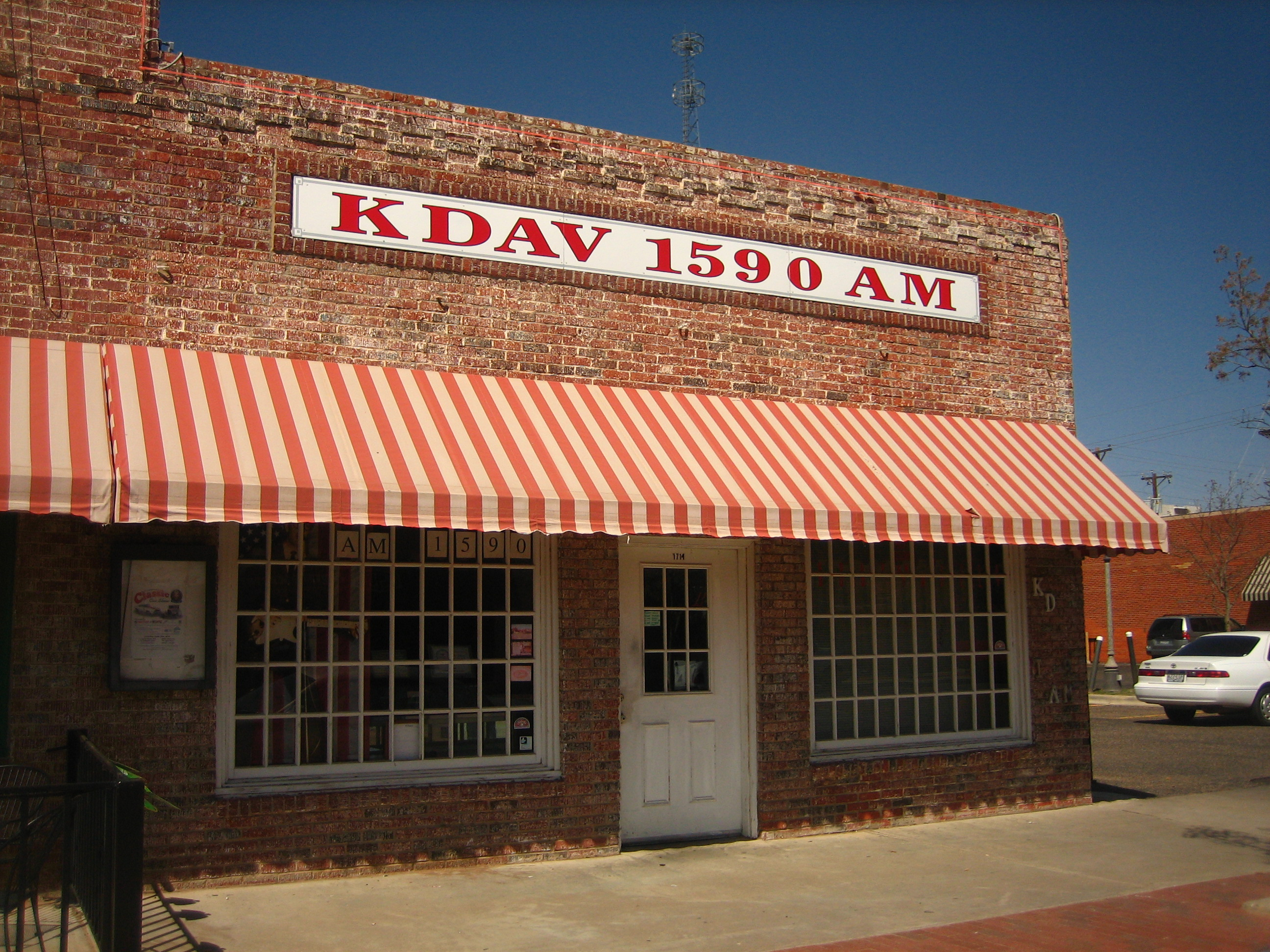
KDAV radio, Lubbock, Texas, 2009

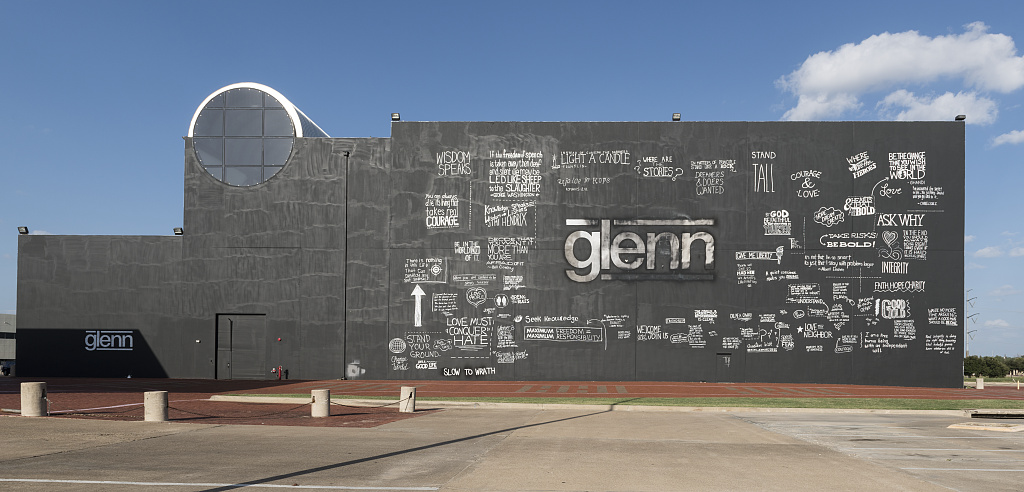
Mercury Studios, Irving, Texas, 2014
