= KPSR =

KPSR may refer to:

- KPSR-LP, a defunct low-power radio station (99.5 FM) formerly licensed to serve Pasadena, Texas, United States
- KXOK-LP (California), a defunct low-power radio station (107.9 FM) formerly licensed to serve Modesto, California, United States, which held the call sign KPSR-LP from 2005 to 2015
- KPSR, a low-power non-commercial educational radio station licensed to Pinewood School, Los Altos, California, in the years around 1970.
