= KJAS =

KJAS may refer to:

- KJAS (FM), a radio station (107.3 FM) licensed to Jasper, Texas, United States
- KJAS-LP, a low-power radio station (102.1 FM) licensed to Ames, Iowa, United States
- KKHT-FM, a radio station (100.7 FM) licensed to Winnie, Texas, United States, which held the call sign KJAS from January 1987 to August 1996
- KJXX, a radio station (1170 AM) licensed to Jackson, Missouri, United States, which held the call sign KJAS until June 1986
- Jasper County Airport (Texas) (ICAO airport code KJAS)
