= KMLS =

KMLS may refer to:

- KMLS (FM), a radio station (95.5 FM) licensed to serve Miles, Texas, United States
- Miles City Airport (ICAO code KMLS)
