= Kamy =

Kamy may refer to:

- KAMY (FM), a Lubbock, Texas radio station broadcasting on 90.1 FM
- KAMY (AM), a defunct McCamey, Texas radio station on 1450 AM.
- Kami, a divine being in Shinto culture

== People ==
- Kamy Sepehrnoori, a Bank of America centennial professor
- Kamy Keshmiri, an American athlete
