= KHFD =

KHFD may refer to:

- Hartford-Brainard Airport (ICAO code KHFD)
- KHFD-LD, a low-power television station (channel 13, virtual 16) licensed to Dallas, Texas, United States; see List of television stations in Texas
- KHFD, the former call sign for FM radio station KJNZ in Hereford, Texas, 1997–2004
