= KWVH-LP =

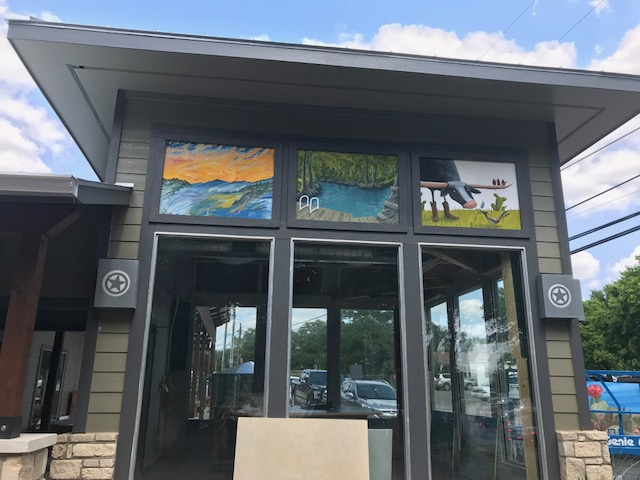
- KWVH "Fishbowl" on-air studio
- Wimberley, Texas; United States
- Broadcast area: Wimberley, Texas / Texas Hill Country / Wimberley Valley
- Frequency: 94.3 MHz
- Branding: ‘’Wimberley Valley Radio’’

Programming
- Format: Variety

Ownership
- Owner: Wimberley Valley Radio; (Wimberley Valley Radio)

History
- First air date: August 22, 2016
- Former frequencies: 94.1 MHz (2016–2020)

Technical information
- Licensing authority: FCC
- Facility ID: 192509
- Class: LP100
- ERP: 100 watts
- HAAT: 11.0 meters (36.1 ft)
- Transmitter coordinates: 29°59′0.1″N 98°7′21.5″W

Links
- Public license information: LMS
- Webcast: Listen Live
- Website: wimberleyvalleyradio.org

KWVH-LP (94.3 FM) Wimberley Valley Radio is a community radio station licensed to Wimberley, Texas, USA. The station is owned and operated by Wimberley Valley Radio, a 501(c)3 nonprofit corporation.

The station’s service designation is as an FL Low Power FM (LPFM) station broadcasting on Channel 232 as a class L1 station at a frequency of 94.3 MHz.

== Purpose and funding ==
Wimberley Valley Radio was organized to operate a noncommercial community radio station to support Wimberley’s local musicians and arts community; provide educational programming, including public and emergency information; provide local and county news unavailable in other broadcast media in the area; and to educate interested individuals including students in radio-related technical and communication skills. As a nonprofit, KWVH's primary sources of funding come from individual donations, event ticket sales, business underwriting, and grants.

=== Listening ===
KWVH Wimberley Valley Radio can be heard on 94.3 FM, or listen online at KWVH.org, on the KWVH iPhone and Android apps, or the TuneIn Radio app.

KWVH provides music, news and information for the Wimberley area covering local arts, entertainment, public affairs, schools, and broadcasts Wimberley High School football games. All programs are locally produced.

=== Station location ===
KWVH broadcasts from its studios located just off The Square in Wimberley on Old Kyle Road in The Lumberyard Retail Center, 111 Old Kyle Road.

== History ==
=== Founding ===
Wimberley Valley Radio was formed directly as a result of the fires that ravaged Central Texas in 2011. Wildfires were numerous and Austin media were busy covering the biggest and most deadly, which meant they mostly ignored the fires in the Wimberley area. Some members of the Wimberley community saw the need for a local radio station that could report emergency information that would help keep residents safe.

=== FCC authorization ===
A construction permit was granted in January 2015, and the call letters KWVH-LP were reserved. Before a radio station could be funded and built, the Memorial Day Weekend Flood of 2015 occurred, killing eight people in and near Wimberley and destroying 350-to-400 residences along the Blanco River.

Recognizing the community’s need for timely communication due to the disaster, the Board of Wimberley Valley Radio applied for and received temporary authorization from the FCC to broadcast for 30 days, within a week and a half of the flood. They also leased space for a station close to the town center, and set up a temporary recording studio. With borrowed equipment KWVH began broadcasting from a volunteer’s ham radio antenna above his hilltop house on June 5, 2015.

At the end of the 30 days, the board applied for a permanent license. In accordance with FCC rules, the station was able to continue broadcasting while waiting to obtain a permanent FCC license. On February 25, 2016, that license was granted. But it required a relocation of the transmitter as well as station build-out before live broadcasting began on Aug. 22, 2016.

Grant funding enabled volunteers to construct two broadcast studios in 2016 on the premises of Wimberley Valley Radio's offices at the Lumberyard Retail Center on Old Kyle Road in Wimberley.

An additional studio dubbed the “fishbowl” was completed in May 2018, jutting out in front of the building where passers-by can watch and listen to live radio programming.

In 2024, the station relocated its transmitter while boosting the signal strength to 100 watts and greatly increasing the number of households which could receive its broadcast. KWVH also increased its ability to serve the community in weather emergencies by erecting a dedicated station tower with line-of-sight to the new broadcast tower to improve site-to-tower communication and redundancy.

== See also ==
- List of radio stations in Texas
- List of community radio stations in the United States
