= KQLC =

- Sealy, Texas; United States
- Frequency: 90.7 MHz

Programming
- Format: Christian Country

Ownership
- Owner: Community Radio, Inc.
- Sister stations: KJIC

History
- Former call signs: KCPC (2007–2010); KBCP (2010)

Technical information
- Licensing authority: FCC
- Facility ID: 93045
- Class: A
- ERP: 1,700 watts
- HAAT: 136 metres (446 ft)
- Transmitter coordinates: 29°50′5″N 96°16′10″W

Links
- Public license information: Public file; LMS
- Website: Official Website

KQLC (90.7 FM) is a radio station licensed to serve the community of Sealy, Texas. The station is owned by Community Radio, Inc. and airs a Christian Country format.

The station was assigned the call sign KCPC by the Federal Communications Commission on June 22, 2007. The station changed its call sign to KBCP on September 16, 2010, and then to KQLC on October 22, 2010.
