= KLDE =

- Eldorado, Texas; United States
- Frequency: 104.9 MHz

Programming
- Format: Silent (was Oldies)

Ownership
- Owner: Tenn-Vol, Corp.
- Sister stations: KPEP

History
- First air date: 2007

Technical information
- Licensing authority: FCC
- Facility ID: 170941
- Class: C2
- ERP: 50,000 watts
- HAAT: 85 meters (279 feet)
- Transmitter coordinates: 30°51′55″N 100°35′36″W
- Translator: 105.3 K287AT (San Angelo)

Links
- Public license information: Public file; LMS
- Website: Official website

KLDE (104.9 FM) is a radio station licensed to serve Eldorado, Texas. The station is owned by Tenn-Vol, Corp.

The station was assigned the KLDE call letters by the Federal Communications Commission on July 16, 2007.
