= KXOX =

Radio station in Sweetwater, Texas

Coordinates: 32°29′16″N 100°23′31″W

- Sweetwater, Texas; United States
- Broadcast area: Sweetwater/Abilene
- Frequencies: KXOX-FM: 96.7 MHz; KXOX-AM: 1240 kHz
- Branding: KXOX

Programming
- Format: Country

Ownership
- Owner: Stein Broadcasting Company

History
- First air date: Late 1930s

Technical information
- Licensing authority: FCC
- Class: KXOX-FM: A KXOX-AM: C
- Power: KXOX-AM: 1000 Watts
- ERP: KXOX-FM: 2,900 Watts

Links
- Public license information: Public file; LMS
- Website: http://www.kxox.net

KXOX is a radio station in the Sweetwater, Texas, area, simulcast on 96.7 FM and 1240 AM. The station's format is country music. The station is owned by Stein Broadcasting Company. The broadcast first went on the air on November 19, 1939.

== Past personalities ==
- Ed Alexander - sportscaster (1950–1951, 1954–1955)
