= KOPE =

Eldorado, Texas; United States
- Frequency: 88.9 MHz

Programming
- Format: Defunct (formerly Jazz)

Ownership
- Owner: The Center for Education Nonprofit Corp.

Technical information
- Licensing authority: FCC
- Facility ID: 176097
- Class: C3
- ERP: 17,000 watts
- HAAT: 63 metres (207 ft)
- Transmitter coordinates: 30.8653°N 100.5933°W

Links
- Public license information: Public file; LMS
- Website: Official Website

KOPE (88.9 FM) was an American radio station licensed by the FCC to serve the community of Eldorado, Texas. The station license was assigned to The Center for Education Nonprofit Corp. KOPE aired a jazz format.

The station had held the KOPE callsign since September 21, 2009.

The FCC cancelled KOPE's license on March 14, 2023, due to the station having been silent since at least February 17, 2021.
