= KFST =

- Fort Stockton, Texas; United States
- Broadcast area: Fort Stockton–Alpine
- Frequency: 860 kHz
- Branding: KFST AM 860

Programming
- Format: Adult contemporary
- Affiliations: Westwood One

Ownership
- Owner: Fort Stockton Radio Co., Inc.
- Sister stations: KFST-FM

History
- First air date: May 6, 1954
- Call sign meaning: Fort Stockton

Technical information
- Licensing authority: FCC
- Facility ID: 22102
- Class: B
- Power: 250 watts
- Transmitter coordinates: 30°52′37″N 102°53′30″W

Links
- Public license information: Public file; LMS
- Website: www.kfstradio.com

KFST-FM
- Fort Stockton, Texas; United States
- Frequency: 94.3 MHz

History
- First air date: November 6, 1974
- Former call signs: KPJH (1974–1986)

Technical information
- Licensing authority: FCC
- Facility ID: 22103
- Class: A
- ERP: 3,000 watts
- HAAT: 72 meters (236 ft)
- Transmitter coordinates: 30°52′37″N 102°53′30″W

Links
- Public license information: Public file; LMS

KFST (860 AM) and KFST-FM (94.3 FM) are radio stations in Fort Stockton, Texas, United States. They are owned and operated by the Fort Stockton Radio Co., Inc., and broadcast from studios southwest of the town on US 385. KFST broadcasts an adult contemporary format on AM and a country music format on FM with specialty Spanish-language programming; the stations share some news and talk programming.

KFST as an AM station began broadcasting in May 1954, after a multi-year delay induced by an ownership complication. The FM frequency debuted 20 years later, in 1974.

== History ==
On January 14, 1950, a group of five investors trading as the Fort Stockton Broadcasting Company applied to the Federal Communications Commission (FCC) for permission to build a new daytime-only radio station on 860 kHz with a power of 250 watts. The FCC granted the construction permit three months later on April 13, but while the investors hoped to get KFST going by August 1, the station remained off the air. It almost never started, at least under that ownership. One of the investors, Leonard R. Lyon, also owned KTXC in Big Spring. The FCC opened an investigation into the ownership interests of both stations in March 1951 after coming into possession of a letter written by Lyon that indicated possible unauthorized transfers of control, which had never received commission approval. It proposed a hearing into the Big Spring station and the revocation of the KFST permit, leading another company to apply for the frequency. After a days-long hearing in Big Spring in November 1951, FCC chairman Paul A. Walker rendered an initial decision reinstating KTXC and the KFST permit in August 1952, approving construction of KFST to continue in August 1953.

With construction approved, work began on the studios in Fort Stockton's Springhirst Hotel as well as a transmitter site elsewhere. It began broadcasting on May 8, 1954. Over the following years, the station's ownership changed until only Clyde E. Thomas was left as sole owner in January 1955. He then sold the station to George Baker in 1956. In 1961, the commission approved the assignment of the license to a group including Billy H. Hubbs. Hubbs had previously started radio stations across West Texas and in New Mexico and Colorado; prior to that, he founded what became the Odessa American and Pecos Enterprise newspapers; the next year, Jim Hawkins became a station manager and later a part-owner. By 1964, the station aired 14 hours a week of programs in Spanish.

The FM station began as KPJH with a beautiful music format on November 6, 1974. Hawkins sold KFST and KPJH to George Day and Roy Parker in March 1983, starting four years of ownership changes that ended with Ken Ripley and William Gail Garlitz as owners by 1987. During this time, in 1986, KPJH became KFST-FM.

== Programming ==
KFST and KFST-FM have separate music formats—adult contemporary and country, respectively. The stations share morning and noon hours of talk and news programming and air Texas State Network radio news. KFST-FM airs Spanish-language programming on evenings and Sunday afternoons. The AM station offers high school sports and Texas Longhorns football, while Texas A&M Aggies football airs on FM.
