= KBQQ =

KBQQ may refer to:

- KBQQ (FM), a radio station (103.9 FM) licensed to serve Smiley, Texas, United States
- KHKM, a radio station (98.7 FM) licensed to serve Hamilton, Montana, United States, which held the call sign KBQQ in 2012
- KXDR, a radio station (106.7 FM) licensed to serve Pinesdale, Montana, which held the call sign KBQQ from 2003 to 2012
- KMXA-FM, a radio station (99.9 FM) licensed to serve Minot, North Dakota, United States, which held the call sign KBQQ from 1983 to 1996
