= KITY =

Radio station in Llano, Texas

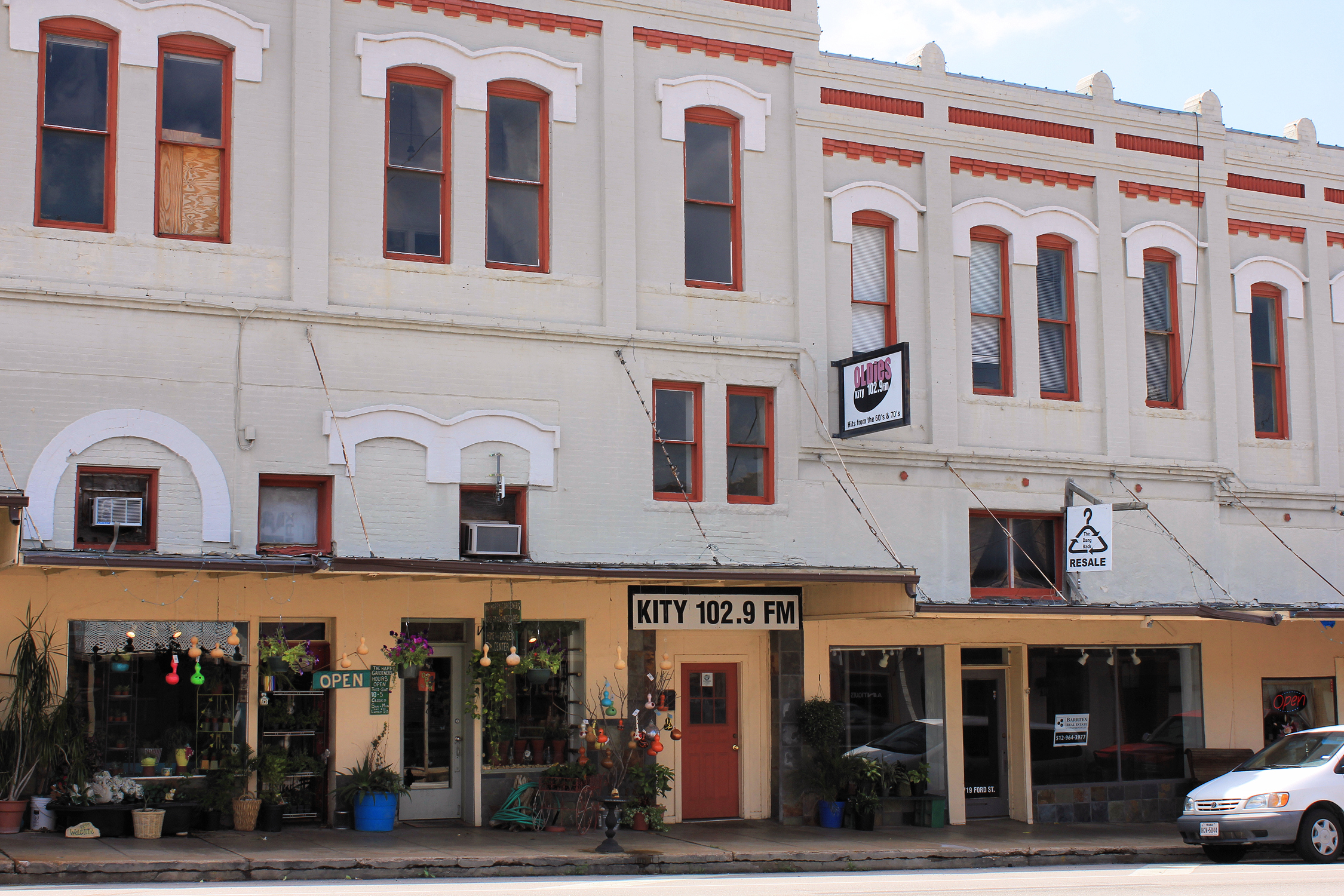
- KITY studios in downtown Llano
- Llano, Texas; United States
- Frequency: 102.9 MHz
- Branding: Stinger FM

Programming
- Format: Texas Country

Ownership
- Owner: Robert Little and Mark St Clair; (River Radio LLC)

Technical information
- Licensing authority: FCC
- Facility ID: 87998
- Class: A
- ERP: 2,000 watts
- HAAT: 151 meters
- Transmitter coordinates: 30°40′37.00″N 98°33′59.00″W
- Translator: 106.1 K291AZ (Burnet)

Links
- Public license information: Public file; LMS

KITY (102.9 FM) is a radio station broadcasting a Texas Country format. Licensed to Llano, Texas, United States, which serves the entire Highland Lakes area: Marble Falls, Burnet, Kingsland, Horseshoe Bay, Granite Shoals, Cottonwood Shores and Llano. The station is currently owned by Robert Little and Mark St Clair, through licensee River Radio LLC. KITY 102.9 features news every hour from NBC Radio. KITY is also heard on 106.1 in Burnet, Texas.

The station's format is "Texas country." The station operates 24/7. The call sign KITY was originally used by another FM station in Texas.

KITY also previously broadcast the oldies format on their sister station KOTY in Mason, Texas, serving Mason, Junction and Harper. KOTY's license was cancelled by the Federal Communications Commission on March 12, 2018, due to having been silent or operating from unauthorized facilities since August 11, 2017.
