= KDAE =

Radio station in Sinton, Texas

Sinton, Texas; United States
- Frequency: 1590 kHz
- Branding: Radio Libertad

Programming
- Format: Spanish Religious

Ownership
- Owner: The Worship Center of Kingsville

History
- Former call signs: KIKN (1970–1984) KTOD (1959–1970)

Technical information
- Licensing authority: FCC
- Facility ID: 63346
- Class: B
- Power: 1,000 watts day 500 watts night
- Transmitter coordinates: 28°1′16″N 97°28′14″W

Links
- Public license information: Public file; LMS
- Webcast: Listen live
- Website: www.radiolibertad.net

KDAE (1590 AM, "Radio Libertad") is a radio station broadcasting a Spanish religious format. Radio Libertad's programming is a variety of Spanish Christian music that ranges from Conjunto, Tejano, Mariachi, Salsa, Reggaton, Rock, Pop and Rap along with Praise & Worship programs. It is licensed to Sinton, Texas, United States, with studios in Corpus Christi, Texas, United States. The station is currently owned by The Worship Center of Kingsville.

== History ==
The station began as KTOD in the late 1950s, featuring an Easy Listening format. In July, 1970, the call letters were changed to KIKN and the format was changed to country music. During the 1970s, KIKN was one of the most popular stations in the Corpus Christi market. The station changed its call sign on August 31, 1984 from KIKN to the current KDAE. On January 11, 1999, the station's license was assigned by Nueces Radio Partners, LP to the current owners.
