= KSTB =

- Crystal Beach, Texas; United States
- Broadcast area: Greater Houston
- Frequency: 101.5 MHz

Ownership
- Owner: Cumulus Media; (Cumulus Licensing LLC)
- Sister stations: KAYD, KTCX, KQXY, KBED, KIKR

History
- First air date: 1993
- Last air date: October 2010
- Former call signs: KRTX
- Call sign meaning: "Star of The Bay"

Technical information
- Facility ID: 18187
- Class: A
- ERP: 6,000 watts
- HAAT: 56 meters (184 ft)
- Transmitter coordinates: 29°30′7″N 94°31′15″W

KSTB (101.5 FM) was a radio station broadcasting a country music format. Licensed to Crystal Beach, Texas, United States, it served much of Greater Houston during its time on the air. The station was owned and operated by Cumulus Media.

== Shutdown ==
On September 13, 2008, the transmitter facility and all of the transmitting equipment were "washed away" by Hurricane Ike. After Hurricane Ike, Cumulus had filed for permission for the station to cease operations and stated that it had no specific plans on whether it will attempt to rebuild the station given the scope of the disaster and the poor economic conditions, according to the FCC filing. The FCC accepted the filing, but did not approve the request as of January 2009. The FCC's standard position is that if a licensed facility remains silent for a year, the license expires as a matter of law, although some exceptions are made.

Prior to its country format, from 1995 to 2003, KSTB played an adult contemporary format under the brand "Star 101.5" with the slogan "The Star Of The Bay." The station was owned by Galtex Broadcasting. While the transmitter was located in Crystal Beach, the business offices and studios were located in Webster, Texas at 711 W. Bay Area Blvd. - in the Bay Area of Houston and Southern Harris County, about 25 miles south of downtown Houston.

Before KSTB broadcast on the 101.5 frequency, its dial position was 104.9 FM with the call sign KRTX, and was licensed to Galveston. At that time the station had the same owners and local DJs. The station later had the slogan "Estereo Latino 104.9". During this period, on-air content was piped in via satellite, with some local content in the form of a morning show and newscasts. The satellite content would continue through the change to KSTB, which began broadcasting in the summer of 1995.

In August 2010, KSTB briefly returned to the airwaves as "Energy", playing music from the 1990s. It was running at very low power, and was thus only receivable in Crystal Beach itself. It is possible that this was simply a transmitter test or a temporary broadcast to keep the station's license active. As of September 30, 2010, the station reportedly went off the air and Cumulus never announced plans for the station. Before Hurricane Ike, KSTB had been simulcasting with sister station KAYD 101.7 as KD 101. Cumulus eventually surrendered KSTB's license to the FCC on September 23, 2015; the FCC cancelled the license and deleted the KSTB call sign on September 25, 2015.
