= KRHC =

Burnet, Texas; United States
- Frequency: 1340 kHz
- Branding: K-Bay

Programming
- Format: Defunct
- Affiliations: Real Country (ABC Radio)

Ownership
- Owner: Moonbeellah Broadcasting Properties Ltd.

History
- Former call signs: KTSL (1961–2004); KBEY (2004–2005)

Technical information
- Facility ID: 34949
- Class: C
- ERP: 1,000 watts unlimited
- Transmitter coordinates: 30°46′4.00″N 98°13′49.00″W

KRHC (1340 AM) was a radio station that broadcast a country music format. Formerly licensed to Burnet, Texas, United States, the station was owned by Munbilla Broadcasting Properties Ltd. and featured programming from ABC Radio .

== History ==
The station was first licensed, as KTSL, on September 26, 1963. It became KBEY on March 26, 2004, and on January 18, 2005, the station changed its call sign to KRHC.

The call sign KRHC used to be the call sign for the student-operated radio station at Rio Hondo Community College in Whittier, California in the 1970s throughout most of the 1980s.

On December 14, 2011, the station surrendered its license to the Federal Communications Commission.
