= KLBW =

New Boston, Texas; United States
- Broadcast area: Texarkana
- Frequency: 1530 kHz
- Branding: "1530 The Light"

Programming
- Format: Defunct (was religious radio)

Ownership
- Owner: Chapel of Light

History
- First air date: 1970
- Former call signs: KNBO (1970–2008)

Technical information
- Facility ID: 6559
- Class: D
- Power: 2,500 watts day only
- Transmitter coordinates: 33°28′56.00″N 94°25′25.00″W

KLBW (1530 AM) was a radio station broadcasting a religious radio format. Licensed to New Boston, Texas, United States, it served the Texarkana area. The station was last owned by Chapel of Light.

As of 2018, the station had been off the air for some time. The studios and transmitter facilities appear to be long since abandoned and neglected. Its license was not renewed and expired on August 1, 2021.
