= KAMY (AM) =

Radio station broadcasting in McCamey, Texas

KAMY (1450 AM) was a radio station broadcasting in McCamey, Texas. It signed on April 2, 1954, as KCMR, and shut down on March 6, 1968. The KAMY license was deleted on August 1, 1967. The studios were burned in a fire on September 19, 1967. The station was first owned by Sapphire Broadcasting Company, before being transferred to Upton Radio in 1963. The station was off air temporarily from January 1, 1961, until 1963.
