= KJAS (FM) =

Coordinates: 30.9754°N 93.9902°W

- Jasper, Texas; United States
- Broadcast area: Jasper, Texas; Newton, Texas
- Frequency: 107.3 MHz
- Branding: KJAS 107.3

Programming
- Format: Adult contemporary

Ownership
- Owner: James M. Lout DBA Rayburn Broadcasting, Inc.
- Sister stations: KFAH

History
- First air date: 1996
- Call sign meaning: Jasper

Technical information
- Licensing authority: FCC
- Facility ID: 15921
- Class: C3
- ERP: 8,000 watts
- HAAT: 100 meters (330 ft)

Links
- Public license information: Public file; LMS
- Webcast: Listen live
- Website: kjas.com

KJAS (107.3 FM) is a radio station licensed to Jasper, Texas. The station broadcasts an adult contemporary format from Westwood One and is owned by James M. Lout DBA Rayburn Broadcasting, Inc.
