= KJNZ =

Radio station in Hereford, Texas (1997–2014)

Hereford, Texas; United States
- Frequency: 103.5 MHz

Programming
- Format: Defunct (formerly Regional Mexican)

Ownership
- Owner: Hereford Broadcasting, LLC

History
- First air date: 1997 (as KAUU)
- Last air date: October 2014
- Former call signs: KAUU (5/1997-6/1997); KHFD (1997–2000)

Technical information
- Licensing authority: FCC
- Facility ID: 77826
- Class: C2
- ERP: 50,000 watts
- HAAT: 85 meters (279 ft)
- Transmitter coordinates: 34°45′0″N 102°22′54″W

Links
- Public license information: Public file; LMS

KJNZ (103.5 FM) was a radio station broadcasting a Regional Mexican format. The station was licensed to Hereford, Texas, United States, and was owned by Hereford Broadcasting, LLC.

== History ==
The station went on the air as KAUU on May 16, 1997. On June 9, 1997, the station changed its call sign to KHFD, and on December 4, 2004 to KJNZ.

The Federal Communications Commission cancelled the station's license on January 14, 2020, due to the station's licensee failing to respond to allegations that the station had been silent since at least October 2014.
