= KMLS (FM) =

- Miles, Texas; United States
- Broadcast area: San Angelo, Texas
- Frequency: 95.5 MHz
- Branding: 95.5FM KMLS

Programming
- Format: Traditional Country
- Affiliations: All Ag Network; Texas State Network

Ownership
- Owner: Miriam Media, Inc.

History
- First air date: January 14, 2015
- Call sign meaning: Miles

Technical information
- Licensing authority: FCC
- Facility ID: 170983
- Class: C3
- ERP: 7,600 watts
- HAAT: 37 meters (121 ft)
- Transmitter coordinates: 31°31′50.50″N 100°18′29.30″W

Links
- Public license information: Public file; LMS
- Webcast: Listen live

KMLS is a traditional country music formatted broadcast radio station. The station is licensed to Miles, Texas and serves San Angelo in Texas. KMLS is owned and operated by Miriam Media, Inc.
