= KIKR =

Former simulcast with KBED Nederland
- Beaumont, Texas; United States
- Broadcast area: Beaumont-Port Arthur area
- Frequency: 1450 kHz
- Branding: Sports Radio Beaumont

Programming
- Language: English
- Format: Sports
- Affiliations: Infinity Sports Network

Ownership
- Owner: Cumulus Media; (Cumulus Licensing LLC)
- Sister stations: KAYD-FM; KBED; KQXY; KTCX

History
- First air date: June 12, 1962 (as KAYC)
- Last air date: March 7, 2025
- Former call signs: KAYC (1962–1995); KAYD (1995–1999)
- Call sign meaning: "Kicker" (former branding when calls were associated with 880 in Conroe).

Technical information
- Licensing authority: FCC
- Facility ID: 52406
- Class: C
- Power: 1,000 watts
- Transmitter coordinates: 30°3′51.8″N 94°7′11.6″W
- Repeaters: There are currently no repeaters as of 2026. This station and its repeater, 1450 KBED (Nederland), are dead.

Links
- Public license information: Public file; LMS

KIKR (1450 AM, branded as Sports Radio Beaumont) was a radio station serving the Beaumont/Port Arthur area with a sports format. It was under ownership of Cumulus Media, and simulcast with sister station KBED AM 1510 Nederland, Texas. Its studios were located on South Eleventh Street in Beaumont and its transmitter was located half a mile southeast of the studios.

== History ==
KIKR received its license as KAYC on June 12, 1962, and was owned by Texas Coast Broadcasters, Inc. It was once the AM sister to KAYD (97.5 FM) hence "KAY-C" and "KAY-D".

The first station to operate on 1450 kHz in the area was KRIC in the 1940s. The FM, (then KRIC-FM) was originally 99.5 but was moved to 97.5 in a swap with Lake Charles, Louisiana, due to the second harmonic of 99.5 falling in the middle of TV channel 11. At the time, there were no TV stations in Beaumont and KHOU, then KGUL, was on the air with CBS from a tower north of Galveston island. Viewers in the Beaumont area trying to watch KGUL could not due to the interference. After numerous complaints were lodged, the Federal Communications Commission (FCC) swapped 99.5 for 97.5 and the problem went away. KRIC-FM, now KFNC, is one of the oldest FMs in Texas on the current 88-108 MHz band.

From 1962 to 1980, KAYC was a Top 40 powerhouse with local legend Al Caldwell in the mornings, a variety of med-day personalities, and Paul King (Box) doing afternoons for 8 years. KAY-C carried American Top 40 with Casey Kasem along with Robert W. Morgan's Special of the Week. Its main competitors were KOLE and KLVI. In 1978, FM sister station KAYD flipped formats from album-oriented rock to top 40. KAYC and KAYD simulcast some weekend programming, including American Top 40, but kept separate programming at other times. By the 1980s, top 40 on KAYC was waning and the FM had gone to a country music format. Eventually the callsign changed as Charlie Pride had bought the stations and they went country. But FM had taken over the music airwaves and eventually 1450 became a Spanish-language station before finally becoming a sports radio station.

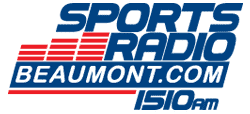
Previous logo

KIKR, along with simulcast partner KBED, went silent in March 2025. They were two of six Cumulus stations to close the weekend of March 7, as part of a larger shutdown of underperforming Cumulus stations. In March 2026, both stations turned in their licenses to the FCC. KIKR's license was cancelled on March 9, 2026.
