= KKMY =

Radio station in Orange, Texas

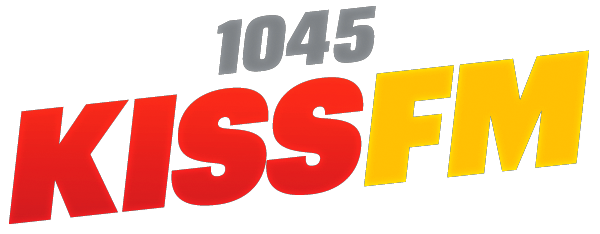
- Orange, Texas; United States
- Broadcast area: Beaumont/Port Arthur
- Frequency: 104.5 MHz (HD Radio)
- Branding: 104.5 Kiss FM

Programming
- Language: English
- Format: Rhythmic Top 40
- Subchannels: HD2: Mainstream urban "103.3 The Beat"
- Affiliations: Premiere Networks

Ownership
- Owner: iHeartMedia; (iHM Licenses, LLC)
- Sister stations: KCOL-FM, KYKR, KIOC, KLVI

History
- First air date: July 14, 1972
- Former call signs: KOBS (1972–1974); KZOM-FM (1974–1980); KZOM (1980–1984)
- Call sign meaning: previous "My 104.5" branding

Technical information
- Licensing authority: FCC
- Facility ID: 62239
- Class: C1
- ERP: 100,000 watts
- HAAT: 233 meters (764 ft)
- Translator: HD2: 103.3 K277AG (Beaumont)

Links
- Public license information: Public file; LMS
- Webcast: Listen live (via iHeartRadio); Listen live (via iHeartRadio) (HD2)
- Website: kiss1045fm.iheart.com 1033thebeat.iheart.com (HD2)

KKMY (104.5 FM, "104.5 Kiss FM"), is a Rhythmic Top 40 formatted radio station in Orange, Texas. It serves the entire Golden Triangle (Beaumont, Port Arthur and Orange) and is owned by iHeartMedia. Its studios are located southeast of the I-10/US 69 interchange in Beaumont, and its transmitter is located in Vidor, Texas.

== History ==
KOBS signed on the air July 14, 1972, with an ERP of 55 kilowatts, at a height of 215 meters, from a transmission site on Moss Lane in Orange County, 7 miles northwest of Orange, Texas. The facility was originally owned by Charles Hubert Kobs, who requested the original KOBS call sign for the facility.

The station became Album Oriented Rock "Zoom 104 & 1/2" as KZOM-FM on March 13, 1974. The -FM suffix was dropped from the KZOM call set on April 1, 1980.

On February 1, 1984, by this point branded as "Zoom 104", the station changed formats from Rock to Adult Contemporary "My 104.5", accompanied by a call change to the current KKMY. In the 2000s, KKMY tweaked its format from Adult Contemporary to Hot Adult Contemporary as "Mix 104.5".

The station flipped formats to the current Rhythmic Top 40 playlist in 2011. KKMY plays hit music from iHeartMedia Premium Choice's "Wild" Rhythmic format feed, targeted towards a younger audience. The station's main competition is Cumulus Media's Top 40/CHR KQXY.

== KKMY-HD2; "103.3 The Beat" ==
On August 1, 2014, KKMY's HD2 subchannel and FM translator K277AG, which had aired a comedy format, was launched with a R&B/Hip-Hop format as "103.3 The Beat," which is also using programming from the Premium Choice feed. Patterned after its sister station in Houston, KQBT, the translator/HD2 combo is targeting younger listeners as it takes on Cumulus Urban KTCX, who, like sister station KQXY, caters to adult listeners with a conservative playlist.

| Call sign | Frequency | City of license | FID | ERP (W) | HAAT | Class | Transmitter coordinates | FCC info |
|---|---|---|---|---|---|---|---|---|
| K277AG | 103.3 FM | Beaumont, Texas | 51844 | 90 | 51.3 m (168 ft) | D | 30°04′33″N 94°07′49″W | LMS |
