= KYKR =

- Beaumont, Texas; United States
- Broadcast area: Beaumont/Port Arthur
- Frequency: 95.1 MHz
- Branding: "Kicker 95.1"

Programming
- Language: English
- Format: Country
- Affiliations: Premiere Networks

Ownership
- Owner: iHeartMedia, Inc.; (iHM Licenses, LLC)
- Sister stations: KLVI, KKMY, KCOL-FM, KIOC

History
- First air date: November 27, 1961 (as KHGM)
- Former call signs: KHGM (1961–1966); KTRM-FM (1966–1976); KIEL (1976–1978); KALO-FM (1978–1981); KZZB (1981–1991)
- Call sign meaning: KY(i)cKeR

Technical information
- Licensing authority: FCC
- Facility ID: 25581
- Class: C1
- ERP: 100,000 watts
- HAAT: 131 m (430 ft)
- Transmitter coordinates: 30°03′43.00″N 93°58′50.00″W

Links
- Public license information: Public file; LMS
- Webcast: Listen Live
- Website: kykr.iheart.com

KYKR (95.1 FM, "Kicker 95.1") is a radio station broadcasting a Country format. Licensed to Beaumont, Texas, it serves the Beaumont/Port Arthur metropolitan area, owned by iHeartMedia, Inc. The "Kicker" branding and country format were first broadcast on 93.3 FM (now KQBU-FM) under the current call sign in 1980, owned and operated by Steve Hicks. Its studios are located southeast of the I-10/US 69 interchange in Beaumont, and its transmitter is located in Vidor, Texas.

== History ==
The FCC allocated 95.1 facility in Beaumont received an initial License to Cover on November 27, 1961 as KHGM, owned by Gerald Proctor under the entity of Woodland Broadcasting Company. The facility is currently owned by iHeartMedia, Inc.

For many years, KYKR was located at 93.3 FM, which had first begun as KCAW-FM, the FM companion to 1510 KCAW Port Arthur and owned by Jimmie Joynt. Jimmie sold the station when he moved to Dallas to start Superior Broadcast Products. The KYKR call was issued to 93.3 in 1980 and was owned by the Hicks family of Beaumont (Steve Hicks most notably of CapStar; his father, John Hicks, had owned 560 KLVI since the 1960s) and was moved to the 2000 ft. tower in Devers in 1991 after Steve Hicks had purchased this facility. 93.3 was then sold to Tichenor Media, now Univision, resulting in the KYKR calls and format being permanently moved to this frequency.

This was possible as a result of then Top 40/CHR station "B95" KZZB going silent at 7 p.m. on November 26, 1991, prompting Gulfstar to purchase the 95.1 signal and ultimately place KYKR's country format on it, and then selling 93.3 to Tichenor Media, which began targeting Houston with the new signal that had just been rebuilt in Devers. 93.3 and 95.1 simulcasts briefly before the latter frequency became KYKR's full-time home in the summer of 1992.

KYKR achieved some of its greatest ratings and revenue success from 1999 to 2009 under the direction of program director Mickey Ashworth. During this decade, the lineup included Big D & Bubba in the mornings, Mickey Ashworth mid-days, Jim King of the Road afternoons, and Lia nights.
