= Houston Texans =

NFL team in Houston, Texas

- Current season
Logo	Wordmark
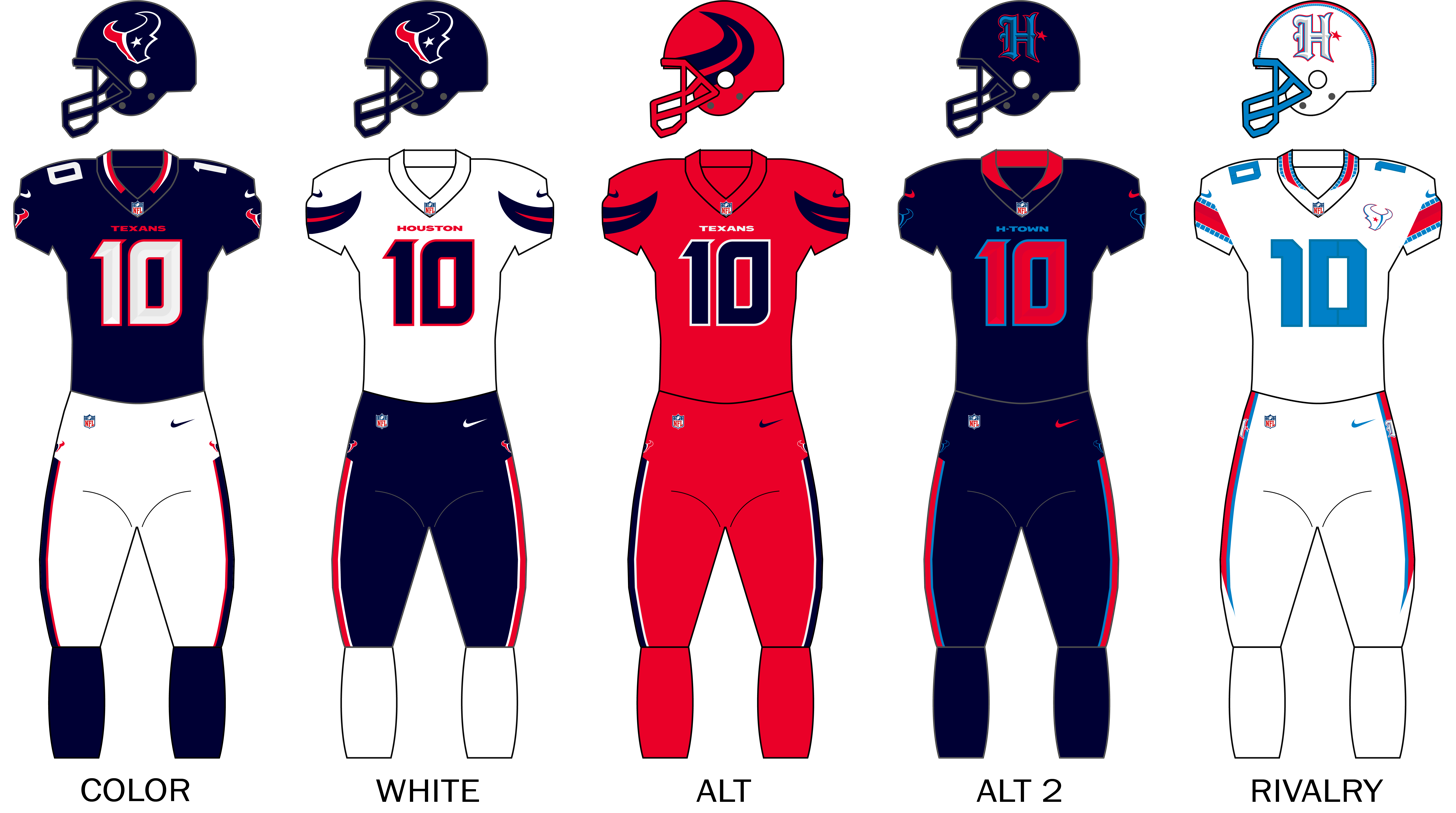
- Uniforms

General information
- Founded: October 6, 1999; 27 years ago
- Stadium: Reliant Stadium; Houston, Texas
- Headquartered: Reliant Stadium; Houston, Texas
- Colors: Deep steel blue, battle red, liberty white, H-Town blue
- Fight songs: "Football Time in Houston" "Hats Off To The Bull" by Chevelle (de facto)
- Mascot: Toro
- Website: houstontexans.com

Personnel
- Owner: Cal McNair
- General manager: Nick Caserio
- Head coach: DeMeco Ryans
- President: Mike Tomon

Nicknames
- Bulls on Parade; Texans Swarm

Team history
- Houston Texans (2002–present)

Home fields
- Reliant Stadium (2002–present)

League / conference affiliations
- National Football League (2002–present): American Football Conference (2002–present); AFC South (2002–present)

Championships
- Division championships: 8: AFC South: 2011, 2012, 2015, 2016, 2018, 2019, 2023, 2024

Playoff appearances (9)
- NFL: 2011, 2012, 2015, 2016, 2018, 2019, 2023, 2024, 2025

Owners
- Bob McNair (1999–2018); Janice McNair (2018–2024); Cal McNair (2024–present)

The Houston Texans are a professional American football team based in Houston. The Texans compete in the National Football League (NFL) as a member of the American Football Conference (AFC) South division. The team plays its home games at Reliant Stadium.

The Texans were founded in 1999, replacing the city's previous NFL franchise, the Houston Oilers, who played from 1960 to 1996 before moving to Nashville and eventually becoming the Tennessee Titans. The Texans began play as an expansion team in 2002, making them the youngest franchise currently competing in the NFL.

While the Texans suffered from growing pains in the 2000s, their fortunes would take a turn for the better in the 2010s when they won their first division championship in 2011, clinching their first playoff berth. The Texans have gone on to win seven more AFC South division championships in 2011, 2012, 2015, 2016, 2018, 2019, 2023, and 2024. They were the only franchise to have never won a road playoff game until they defeated the Pittsburgh Steelers 30–6 in the 2025 AFC Wild Card playoffs. They are the only franchise that has never appeared in a Conference Championship game. They are also one of four franchises to have never appeared in a Super Bowl, alongside the Cleveland Browns, Detroit Lions, and division rival Jacksonville Jaguars.

Bob McNair owned the Texans until his death in 2018, after which the majority ownership of the team went to his wife, Janice. The McNairs' son, Cal, became operating head of the franchise upon his father's death, and became principal owner when his mother transferred ownership to him in 2024. According to an article by Forbes, the Houston Texans are the eleventh richest franchise in the NFL with a value of $4.7 billion in August 2022.

After the Texas Rangers won the 2023 World Series, the Houston Texans became the only big four professional sports franchise currently based in Texas without a championship.

== History ==
In 1997, Houston entrepreneur Bob McNair had a failed bid to bring a National Hockey League (NHL) expansion team to the city, and Bud Adams moved the city's NFL team, the Houston Oilers, to Nashville, Tennessee, where they were renamed the Tennessee Titans in 1999. In 1996, the Cleveland Browns had controversially moved to become the Baltimore Ravens. As part of the settlement between the NFL, the city of Cleveland, and the team owned by Art Modell, the league promised to return football to Cleveland within the next three years.

In order to even out the franchises to 32, the NFL contemplated adding another expansion franchise. As Houston was one of the favorites for the extra franchise, along with Toronto and Los Angeles (the latter of whom had lost the Rams and the Raiders in 1995), McNair then decided to join the football project and founded Houston NFL Holdings with partner Steve Patterson. With Houston Livestock Show and Rodeo, they would push for a domed stadium as part of the bid to lure the NFL back to Houston. On October 6, 1999, the NFL awarded the 32nd team to Houston at a cost of $700 million.

=== McNair family era (2002–present) ===
The Houston Texans joined the NFL in the 2002 season, playing at the newly opened Reliant Stadium under head coach Dom Capers. With their opening game victory over the Dallas Cowboys on September 8, 2002, the Texans became the first expansion team to win its opening game since the Minnesota Vikings beat the Chicago Bears in 1961. The Texans went 4–12 and finished last in the AFC South in their debut season. The team improved to a 5–11 mark in the 2003 season. The team continued to make progress with a 7–9 record in the 2004 season. In the 2005 season, the Texans fell to a 2–14 record for the worst mark in the league. After the season, the team fired Capers as head coach. They earned the top pick in the 2006 NFL Draft.

==== Gary Kubiak years (2006–2013) ====
While the team struggled in its early seasons, results began to improve when native Houstonian Gary Kubiak became the head coach in 2006. The Texans finished with a .500 season (8–8) in 2007 and 2008, and nearly qualified for the 2009–10 playoffs with a 9–7 result in 2009. The Texans started the 2010 season on a 4–2 record going into a Week 7 bye week, but promptly collapsed 2–8 in the second half of the season, finishing 6–10. In the 2011 NFL draft, the Texans acquired Wisconsin star defensive end J. J. Watt 11th overall. The following season, former Cowboys head coach Wade Phillips was hired as the defensive coordinator for the Texans, and the improved defense led to them finishing 10–6, winning their first AFC South title. The Texans then beat the Cincinnati Bengals 31–10 in the Wild Card round of the 2011–12 playoffs, before a 20–13 defeat by the Ravens in the Divisional Round.

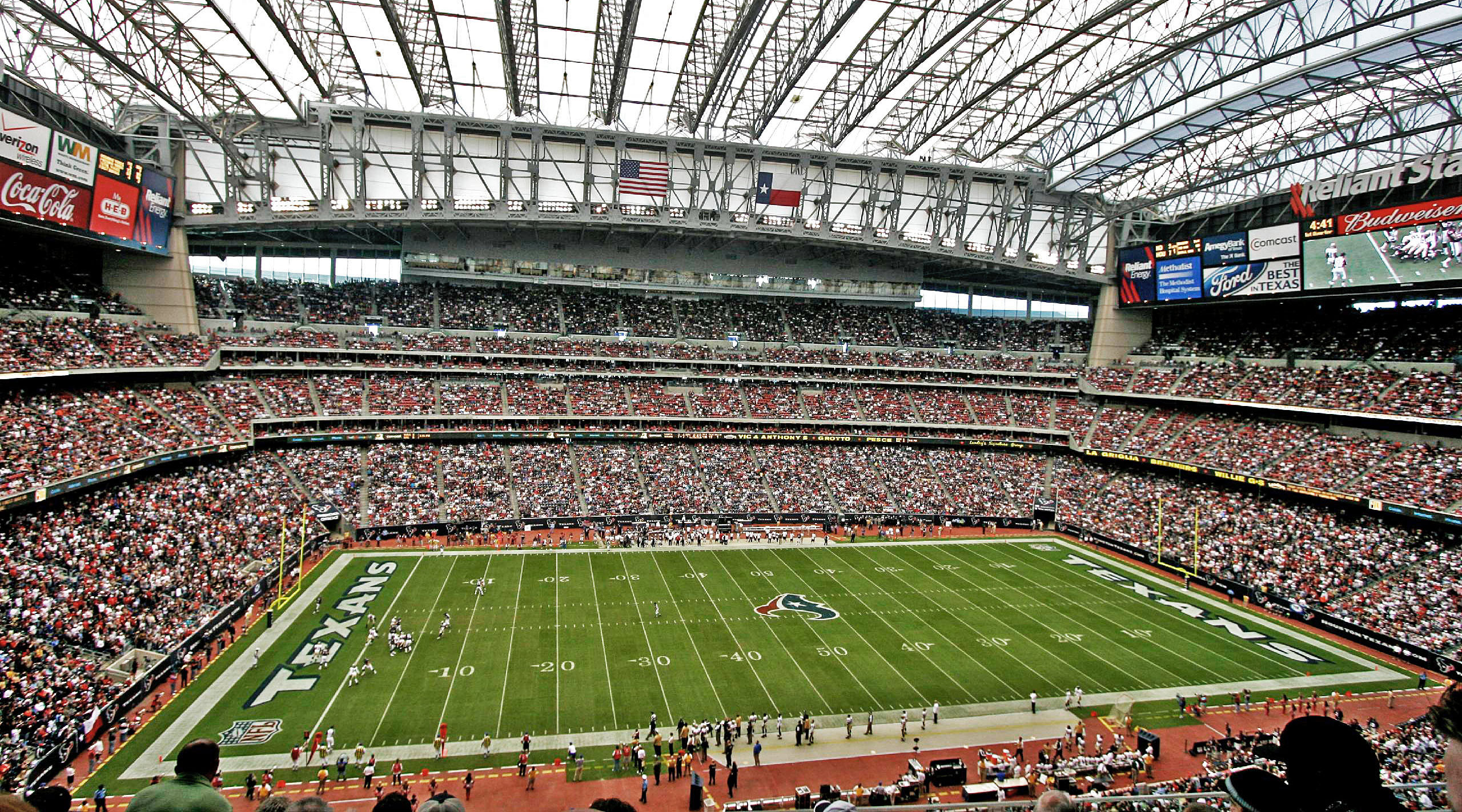
Reliant Stadium in 2007

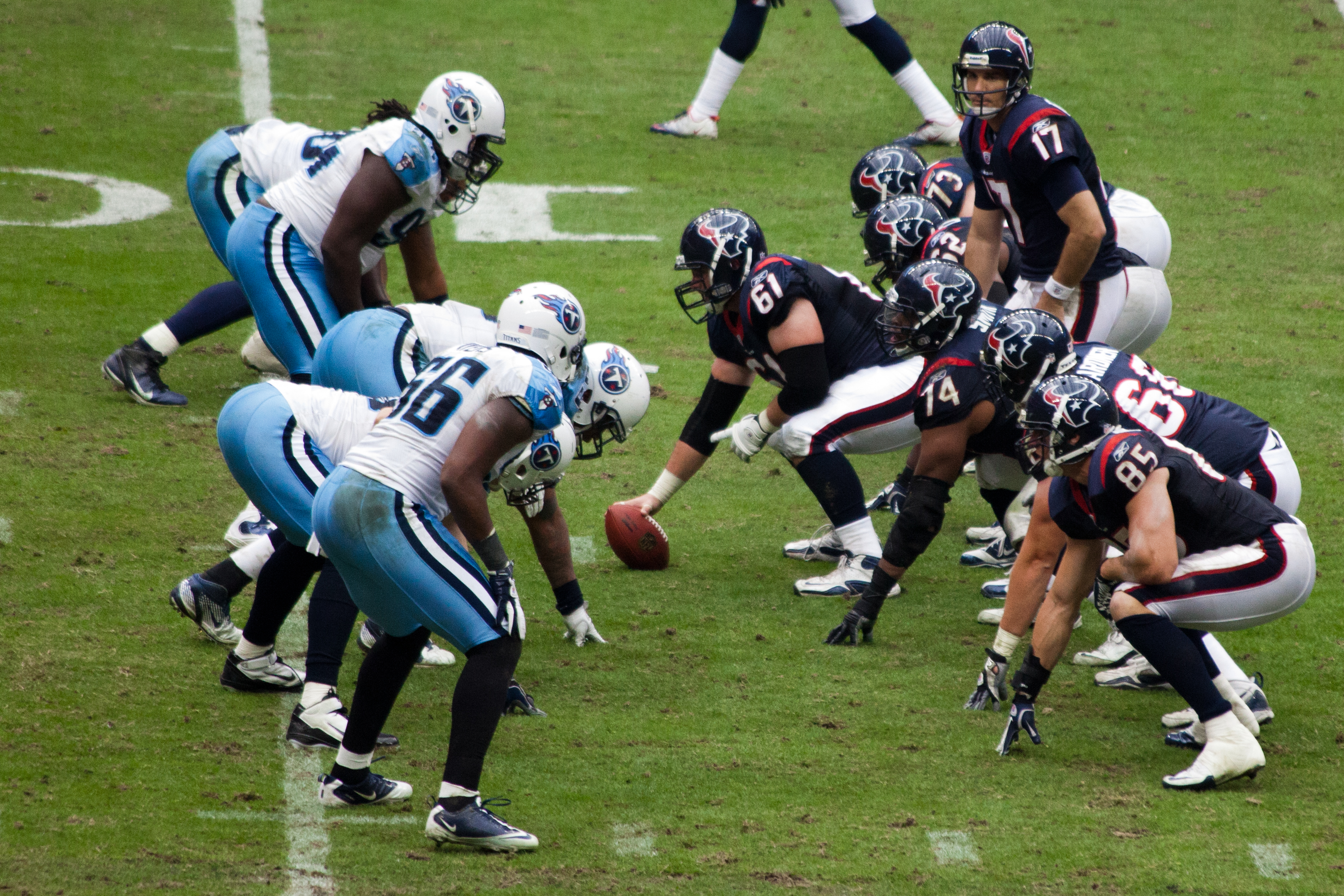
Houston lines up on offense against the Titans in 2012

The Texans surged as the team to beat in the AFC South in 2012, starting 5–0 and holding an 11–1 record by week 14. However, they lost three of their last four games to finish 12–4; beating the rival Indianapolis Colts in that four-game stretch allowing them to clinch their 2nd AFC South title. The Texans beat the Bengals again in the wild-card round, but they lost in the Divisional Round to the New England Patriots.

In the 2013 NFL draft, the Texans acquired Clemson wide receiver DeAndre Hopkins 27th overall. In 2013, the Texans started 2–0 but went into a tailspin and lost every game afterwards. Kubiak was fired as head coach after being swept by the rival Jacksonville Jaguars, who themselves started 0–8. Wade Phillips filled in as head coach, but the Texans' poor play did not change, and they finished 2–14, tying, with 2005, their worst record in franchise history. The 14-game losing streak is the worst in franchise history.

==== Bill O'Brien years (2014–2020) ====
The Texans entered the 2014 season with a 14-game losing streak. Former Penn State head coach Bill O'Brien became the Texans' new head coach, and the third in franchise history, during the offseason. In 2014, the Texans won three of their first four games, defeating the Redskins in the season opener while ending the losing streak, the Oakland Raiders, and the Buffalo Bills, losing to the New York Giants. They lost three of their next four games, losing to the Dallas Cowboys, the Indianapolis Colts, and the Pittsburgh Steelers, respectively. The Texans went on to finish 9–7 in the 2014 season and barely missed the playoffs.

In the 2015 season, they were featured on HBO, on the show "Hard Knocks". That year, the Texans started with a 2–5 record. Quarterback Ryan Mallett was released amidst controversy regarding his benching in favor of Brian Hoyer during a loss against the Indianapolis Colts. After a poor start, the Texans finished with a 9–7 record and won their third AFC South title. However, they were shut out by the Kansas City Chiefs in the Wild Card round 30–0, ending their championship hopes for the year.

On March 9, 2016, the Texans signed former Denver Broncos quarterback Brock Osweiler to a 4-year, $72 million deal. Despite Osweiler's lucrative deal, he struggled significantly during the 2016 season. After throwing two interceptions in Week 15 against the Jaguars, coach Bill O'Brien benched the offseason acquisition in favor of backup quarterback Tom Savage. Savage led a comeback effort against the Jaguars, and was named the starter for the remainder of the season. The Texans clinched their fourth AFC South division title in six years in Savage's first career start against the Bengals in Week 16. They defeated the Oakland Raiders 27–14 in the opening round of the playoffs with Osweiler as the starting quarterback due to Savage being out with a concussion. Osweiler started in the Divisional Round game against the New England Patriots, throwing three interceptions in the second half. The Texans lost 34–16.

In the 2017 NFL draft, the Texans traded up to the 12th overall selection to select Clemson star quarterback Deshaun Watson. Watson started six games his rookie year, going 3–3 and having arguably the greatest and most decorated rookie season by a quarterback in NFL history, eventually rising up to become the Texans' franchise quarterback. However, his success would come up very short, after a Week 8 41–38 loss to the Seattle Seahawks, Watson tore his ACL in practice and was ruled out the remainder of the season, which caused the Texans to have one of their worst seasons. Plagued by a series of unexpected injuries (including an injury to J. J. Watt) and controversy involving the team's suspected violation of the league's concussion protocol, after backup quarterback Tom Savage suffered a seizure after the Week 14 game against the San Francisco 49ers, the Texans went 1–9 the rest of the season and eventually finish 4–12 and last in the AFC South in 2017, missing the playoffs for the first time since 2014 and giving Bill O'Brien his first losing season as Texans head coach.

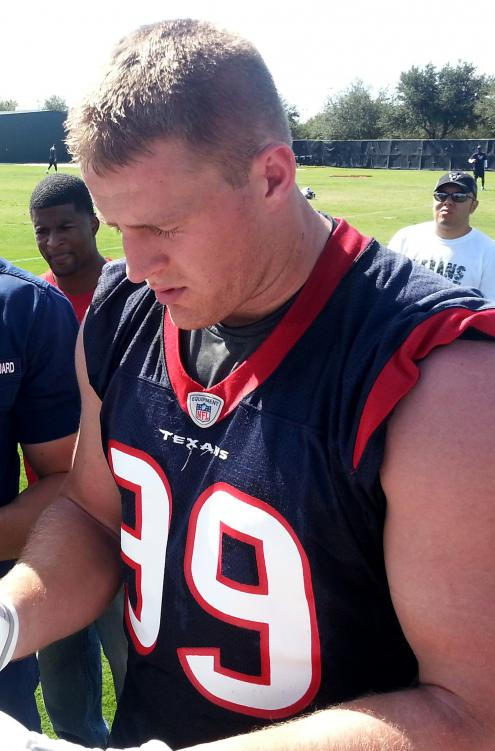
All-Pro DE J. J. Watt (2011–2020)

In 2018, the Texans started the season 0–3, losing by a combined 15 points to the New England Patriots, Tennessee Titans, and New York Giants, before winning a 37–34 overtime shootout on the road in Indianapolis. This win sparked a nine-game winning streak for the Texans, their first since starting 5–0 in 2012, which included a Week 8 win against the Miami Dolphins that included five touchdown passes from Deshaun Watson. This streak was the longest ever for a team that started the season 0–3; the previous record was a seven-game win-streak set by the New York Giants in 1918 after starting out 0–3.

On November 23, 2018, the owner of the Houston Texans, Bob McNair, died from skin cancer. On November 26, 2018, McNair's wife, Janice McNair, became the principal owner and Senior Chair of the Houston Texans, while their son, D. Cal McNair, became the chairman and chief operating officer.

The Texans finished the season 11–5, and won another AFC South division championship under Bill O'Brien. They lost 21–7 in the first round of the playoffs to their AFC South division rival Indianapolis Colts.

In 2019, the Texans won the AFC South division and qualified for the NFL playoffs on the back of a 10–6 record. They went on to defeat the Buffalo Bills by a score of 22–19 in overtime in the AFC wild-card round. However, the Texans' 2019 season came to an end the following week, as they lost to the eventual Super Bowl champion Kansas City Chiefs by a score of 51–31 in the AFC divisional round. The Texans had a 24–0 lead in the game before the Chiefs came back.

On March 22, 2020, the Texans traded away All-Pro wide receiver DeAndre Hopkins and a fourth-round pick in the 2020 NFL draft to the Arizona Cardinals. In return, Houston received running back David Johnson, a 2020 second-round pick, and a 2021 fourth-round pick. The move was confusing and controversial among fans and sportswriters alike, as many claimed that the Texans should have received more valuable assets for Hopkins, who was among the best receivers in the NFL.

The Texans began the 2020 NFL season with a record of 0–4, and Bill O'Brien was consequentially fired after a disappointing loss to the Minnesota Vikings in Week 4. Romeo Crennel, who was the head coach of the Cleveland Browns from 2005 to 2008 and of the Kansas City Chiefs in 2011–12, was named the interim head coach for the remainder of the season. Crennel managed to win more than half of his first 7 games as Houston's head coach, giving Houston a record of 4–7. However, the Texans ended the season on a five-game losing streak. With a final record of 4–12, the Texans were unable to make the playoffs.

==== Rebuilding years (2021–2022) ====
On January 27, 2021, the Texans hired David Culley as the team's head coach. Culley most recently worked as the Baltimore Ravens assistant head coach, wide receivers coach and passing game coordinator. On February 12, 2021, the Texans released all-pro defensive end J.J. Watt. It was confirmed that Watt personally requested owner Cal McNair for his release.

On January 13, 2022, the Texans fired David Culley after posting a 4–13 record as the team's head coach and promoted defensive coordinator Lovie Smith as the team's fifth head coach on February 7, 2022. The team traded away their starting quarterback Deshaun Watson to the Cleveland Browns and a 2024 fifth round pick for three 1st round picks, a 3rd round pick and a 4th round pick on March 20, 2022, due to sexual misconduct lawsuits toward Watson. The Texans opened their 2022 season in a tie game against the Indianapolis Colts, the franchise's first tie in their 20-year existence. On January 9, 2023, the Texans announced that they were going in a different direction by firing Smith after a 3–13–1 season.

==== Ryans and Stroud era (2023–present) ====
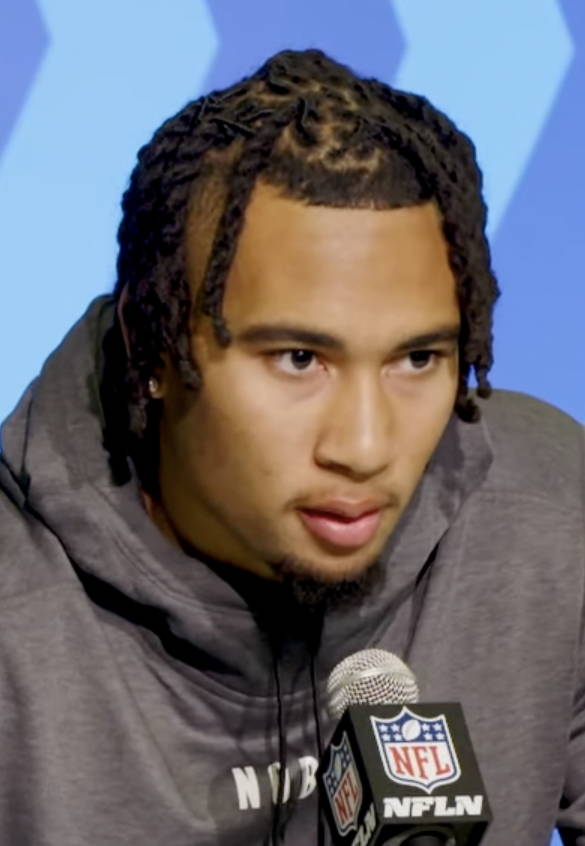
C.J. Stroud performing his NFL Combine Interview. (2023)

On January 31, 2023, the Texans hired former player and 49ers defensive coordinator DeMeco Ryans as their new head coach, making him the sixth head coach in franchise history. In the 2023 NFL draft the Texans selected Ohio State quarterback C. J. Stroud and traded up to the third pick to select defensive end Will Anderson Jr.. Under Ryans and Stroud, the team saw improved fortunes as they made the playoffs while winning the AFC South for the first time since the 2019 season with a 10–7 record, becoming the first NFL team to win their division under a rookie head coach and quarterback. The team defeated the Cleveland Browns 45–14 in the Wild Card Round. The Texans saw their season end in the Divisional Round with a 34–10 loss to the Baltimore Ravens. Stroud would later be named NFL Offensive Rookie of the Year, and Anderson Jr. would be named NFL Defensive Rookie of the Year Award. Ryans also finished in a tie in total votes for NFL Coach of the Year with Browns head coach Kevin Stefanski though he lost the award in a tiebreaker due to having one less first place vote. The 2024 season saw the Texans repeat as AFC South champions with a 10–7 record and make the playoffs. They defeated the Los Angeles Chargers in the Wild Card Round with a 32–12 win and lost to the Chiefs in the Divisional Round. The Texans finished 12–5 and second in the AFC South in the 2025 season following an 0-3 start, making the Texans the first team in NFL history to make the playoffs after an 0-3 start twice, the first time being in 2018. In the postseason, they defeated the Pittsburgh Steelers 30–6 in the Wild Card Round and lost to the New England Patriots 28–16 in the Divisional Round, with Stroud throwing four interceptions in the first half.

== Rivalries ==
The Texans are the youngest expansion team in the NFL, having only been competing in the NFL for 24 seasons since 2002 and have had limited regular season and postseason success. For that reason, they have not had the history or the reputation on which to build classic rivalries like the ones that often exist between older franchises. Despite this, the team has developed some rivalries. Its natural rivals are its fellow AFC South teams, which are the Tennessee Titans, Jacksonville Jaguars, and Indianapolis Colts. The Tennessee Titans have a huge rivalry with this team, due to the relocation controversy that happened in the late '90s for the Titans (then Oilers) to move to Nashville while leaving Houston.

=== Divisional ===
==== Tennessee Titans ====
Many Texans fans view the Tennessee Titans, who were originally the Houston Oilers before moving to Tennessee in 1996, as the Texans' chief rival because both the Texans and Titans are members of the AFC South, and because the owner of the Titans, the Adams family, retains the rights to the "Oilers" name and colors. Many Texans fans argue that the history of the Oilers belongs to Houston, relating in and out of sports. For example, Houston Police cars used to don the Columbia blue and red colors associated with the Oilers, and the "Oilers" namesake alludes to Houston's role in the oil and gas industry. In 2023, the Titans unveiled Oilers throwback uniforms, which they wore in games against the Texans. As of the 2026 season, the Titans have now rebranded their uniforms and logo to the Oilers colors, sparking more outrage from Texans fans. The series is tied, 24–24.

==== Indianapolis Colts ====
Since the early 2000s, the Texans also have an AFC South Division rivalry with the Indianapolis Colts, whom the Texans had not defeated until the 2006 season. The Texans first swept the Colts in the 2016 NFL season, four years after the Colts drafted Houston native Andrew Luck. In 2019 the two teams met in the 2018 AFC Wild Card Playoffs; the Colts won 21–7. In 2023, the 9-7 Colts hosted the 9-7 Texans in a Week 18 matchup, where the winner would clinch a playoff berth. The Texans won 23-19. As of 2025, the Colts lead the all-time series 33-15-1.

==== Jacksonville Jaguars ====
Having begun play in 1995 and 2002, respectively, the Jaguars and Texans are among two of the newer NFL teams. The Jaguars moved from the AFC Central to the newly created AFC South where the Texans were placed into and have competed as division rivals since. As of the 2025 season, the Texans lead the series 32–16.

=== Conference ===
==== Cincinnati Bengals ====
Though not division rivals, the Bengals and Texans had big matchups in the 2010s, such as the 2011 and 2012 Wild Card Round, both of which the Texans won. The two teams also played on primetime in 2015, 2016, and 2017 with the Texans giving the Bengals their first loss after an 8–0 start in the 2015 game. As of 2025, the Texans lead the all-time series 9-5.

=== Interconference ===
==== Dallas Cowboys ====
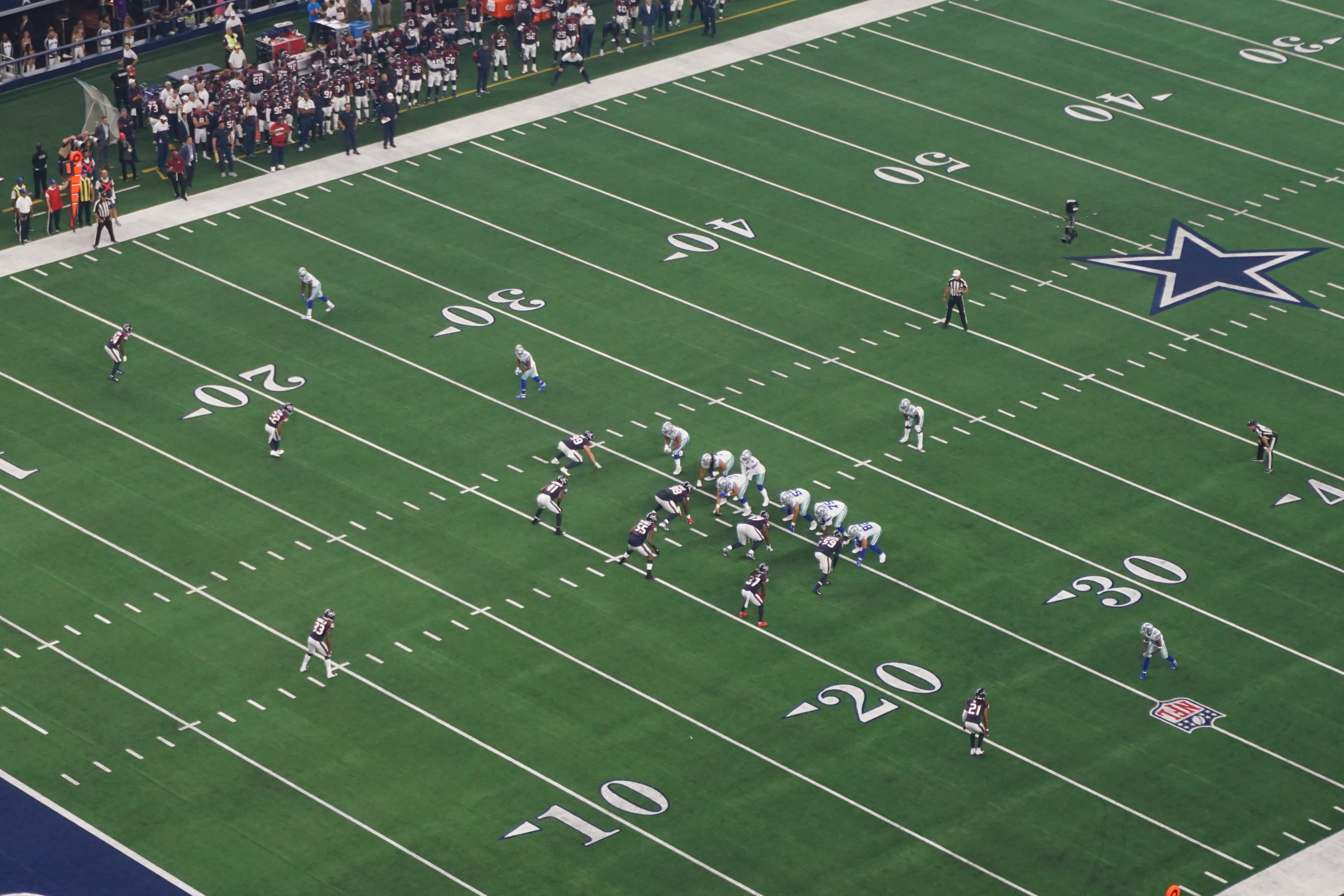
2019 pre-season matchup between the Texans and the Dallas Cowboys

The Texans also have an intrastate/interconference rivalry with the Dallas Cowboys, with whom they contest the so-called Governor's Cup every year (a tradition started between the cities before the Oilers moved) either in the preseason or the regular season for bragging rights in the state of Texas. In 2017, the destruction and flooding caused during Hurricane Harvey a few days before their Week 4 preseason match up time scheduled caused the game to be moved to AT&T Stadium in Arlington, Texas. However, out of concern for the safety of the fans and the condition of the player's families & communities, the game was canceled. As of the 2024 season, the Cowboys lead the all-time series 4–3.

== Culture ==
Some former Oilers fans have become Texans fans. Some celebrities are fans, including Ryan Trahan, George Foreman, Paul Wall, Rico Rodriguez, and Raini Rodriguez.

During the 2010s, the team adopted the moniker "Bulls on Parade" in honor of the Rage Against the Machine song, regularly used in the team's pregame introduction.

== Team identity ==
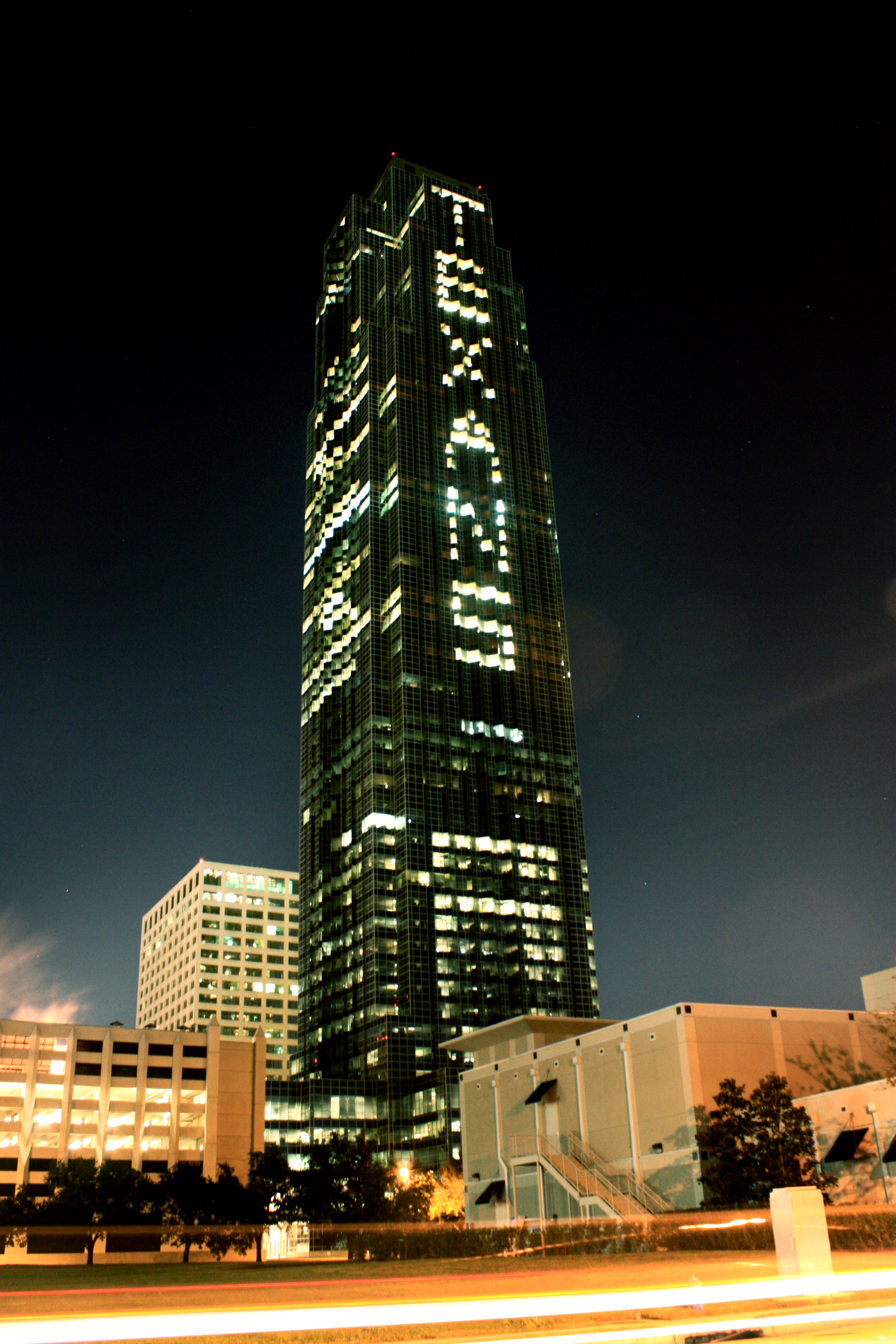
The Williams Tower in Houston showing the word "TEXANS" using its office lights.

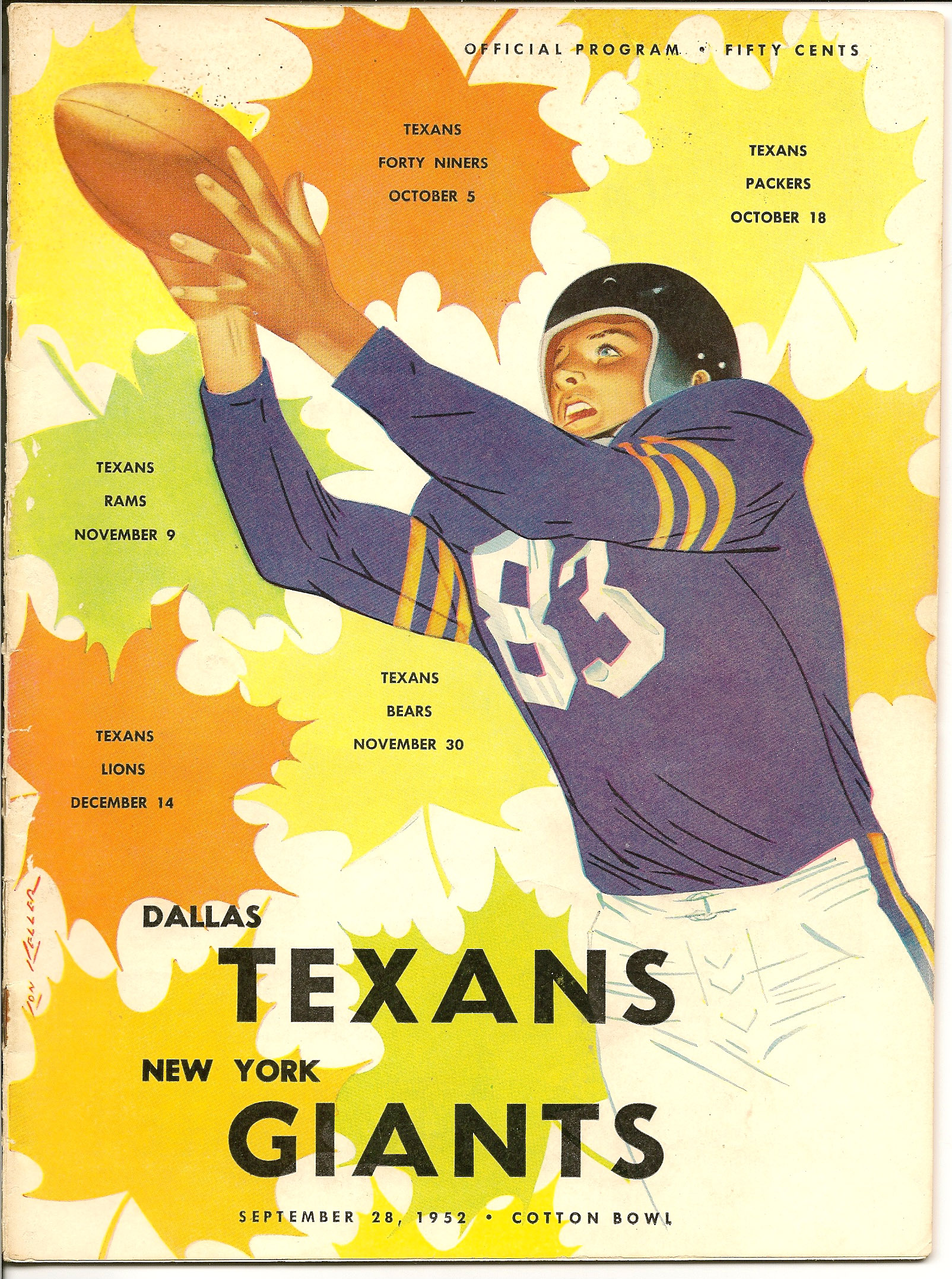
The club's nickname "Texans" was previously used by two franchises in Dallas (NFL: 1952; AFL: 1960–1962)

=== Name ===
In the process of naming the new franchise, leadership conducted an extensive review and research process; the final list of names was determined after several months of research conducted jointly by Houston NFL 2002 and NFL Properties. This included an online survey asking fans and the community to weigh in, which received more than 65,000 responses in one week. On March 2, 2000, it was announced that the team name search had been narrowed down to five choices: Apollos, Bobcats, Stallions, Texans, and Wildcatters.

On September 6, 2000, the NFL's 32nd franchise was officially christened the Houston Texans before thousands at a downtown rally in Houston. McNair explained that the name and logo were chosen to "embody the pride, strength, independence and achievement that make the people of Houston and our area special." The name "Texans" had been used by several now-defunct football teams, including the Canadian Football League franchise in San Antonio; the World Football League franchise in Houston, which moved to Louisiana to become the Shreveport Steamer; the Dallas Texans of the NFL which played in only the 1952 season; and by the precursor of the present-day Kansas City Chiefs, when they were the second incarnation of the Dallas Texans in the American Football League (AFL). Owner Bob McNair received permission from Chiefs' owner Lamar Hunt to use the Texans name for his new team. It is also a subtle homage to the naming style of the NHL team the Montreal Canadiens who also named their team after their respective demonym.

=== Logo and uniforms ===
Along with the team name, McNair unveiled the team logo, an abstract depiction of a bull's head, split in such a way to resemble the flag of Texas and the state of Texas, including a lone star to stand for the eye, the five points of which representing pride, courage, strength, tradition and independence. McNair described the colors as "Deep Steel Blue", "Battle Red" and "Liberty White". A year later the Texans unveiled their uniforms during another downtown rally. The bull is used to signify the state's cattle ranching economy that helped in its early settlement in the 19th century.

The Texans' helmet is dark blue with the Texans bull logo. The helmet was initially white when the team name and logo were unveiled, but was later changed to dark blue. The uniform design consists of red trim and either dark blue or white jerseys. The team typically wears white pants with its blue jerseys and blue pants with its white jerseys. Starting with the 2006 season, the Texans wore all-white for their home opener, and the team began to wear an all-blue combination for home games vs. the Indianapolis Colts. In 2003, the Texans introduced an alternative red jersey with blue trim; they wear this jersey at one home game each year, usually against a division rival. In 2007, the Texans introduced red pants for the first time, pairing them with the red jerseys for an all-red look. They would wear this look until 2010, but was brought back in 2023. In October 2008 the Texans paired blue socks (instead of the traditional red) with their blue pants and white jerseys, eventually becoming the team's primary road uniform combination. In 2016, the Texans unveiled a new uniform combo against the Jacksonville Jaguars, pairing the red jersey with blue pants and red socks. In 2017, the Texans unveiled a Color Rush uniform, using an all-blue uniform but with minimal white elements. In 2021, the Texans began sporting all-white socks on select home and road games. In 2022, the Texans began using a red alternate helmet with the red uniform. In 2023, the red alternate helmet was worn with the Color Rush uniform in a 21–16 victory against the Arizona Cardinals.

In 2002, the team wore a patch commemorating their inaugural season. Also, they celebrated 10 years as a franchise by wearing an anniversary patch throughout 2012. From 2018 to 2019, the Texans wore a memorial patch to honor Bob McNair after his death.

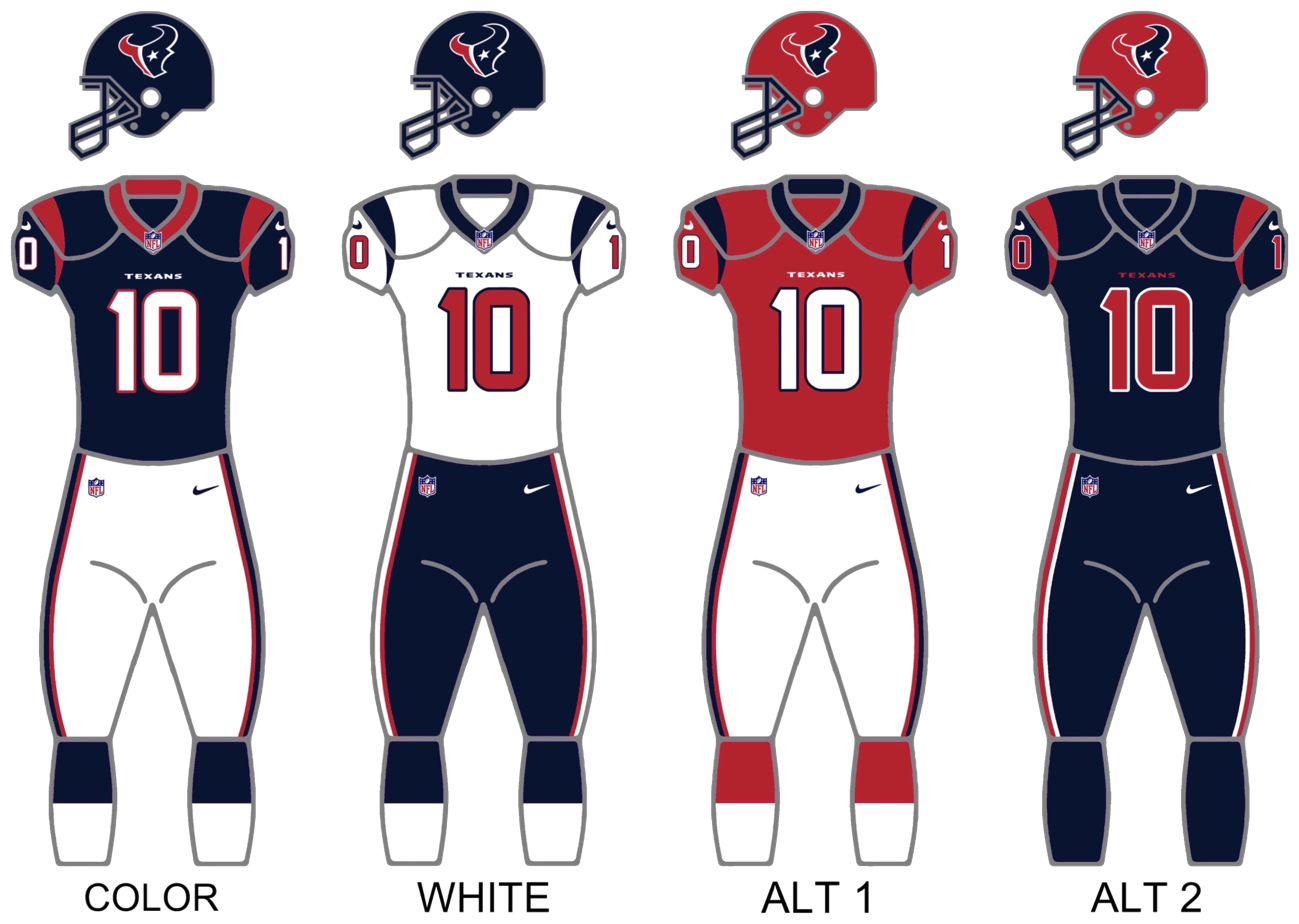
The Texans' uniform set from 2002 to 2023. The red helmet was introduced in 2023, the Color Rush uniform was introduced in 2017, and the red pants were briefly worn from 2007 to 2010 before being reintroduced in 2023.

In April 2024, the Texans unveiled redesigned uniforms. The primary dark blue helmets remained, but the home blue uniforms were updated to include the Texans primary crest on the sleeve and new collar stripes, while the road white uniform featured blue and red horn stripes on the sleeves, along with blue numbers with red trim. The white uniform's design also served as the basis for the red alternate uniform, which is paired with a red helmet containing the blue horn stripes. A second alternate uniform is a navy blue base with "H-Town blue" accents; numbers are red with "H-Town blue" trim. This set is paired with a navy blue alternate helmet containing the "H-Star" decal in "H-Town blue" with red trim. The inclusion of a second alternate helmet is due to the NFL allowing teams with new uniforms to unveil these helmets in advance this season.In August 2026, the Texans unveiled an rivalries all-white uniform featuring their secondary “H” logo on the helmet, metallic chrome details inspired by the city's custom car scene, a graffiti-style number font pulled from the “Be Someone” bridge and an “H-Town Blue” street tile pattern incorporated into the stripes, nameplate and helmet bumpers.

== Players of note ==
=== Current roster ===
Houston Texans roster
Quarterbacks (QB): 10 Davis Mills; 7 C. J. Stroud; Running backs (RB): 21 Emari Demercado; 4 Woody Marks; 32 David Montgomery; Wide receivers (WR): 14 Kayshon Boutte; 12 Nico Collins; 1 Tank Dell; 18 Marvin Harrison Jr.; 19 Xavier Hutchinson; -- Nikko Remigio PR; Tight ends (TE): 9 Brevin Jordan; 83 Marlin Klein; 87 Foster Moreau; 86 Dalton Schultz; 8 Cade Stover	Offensive linemen (OL): 60 Jake Andrews C; 63 Evan Brown C; 77 Trent Brown T; 79 Aireontae Ersery T; 57 Blake Fisher T; 69 Ed Ingram G; 64 Febechi Nwaiwu G; 66 Keylan Rutledge G; 71 Braden Smith T; 75 Wyatt Teller G; 78 Nate Thomas T; Defensive linemen (DL): 51 Will Anderson Jr. DE; 90 Jadeveon Clowney DE; 96 Logan Hall DE; 54 Sabastian Harsh DE; 55 Danielle Hunter DE; 91 Naquan Jones DT; 93 Kayden McDonald DT; 98 Sheldon Rankins DT; 94 Dominique Robinson DE; 72 Tommy Togiai DT	Linebackers (LB): 0 Azeez Al-Shaair; 35 Jake Hansen; 39 Henry To'oTo'o; 30 Wade Woodaz; Defensive backs (DB): 6 Reed Blankenship S; 2 Calen Bullock S; 20 Ja'Marcus Ingram S; 3 Kamari Lassiter CB; 5 Jalen Pitre S; 27 Kamari Ramsey S; 11 Tremon Smith CB; 29 M. J. Stewart FS; 24 Derek Stingley Jr. CB; Special teams (ST): 40 Austin Brinkman LS; 15 Kaʻimi Fairbairn K; 38 Kai Kroeger P	Practice squad: 82 Lewis Bond WR; 53 Chris Braswell LB; 95 Jaden Crumedy DT; 28 Jaden Davis CB; 34 Bryce Hall CB; 47 Caleb Johnson LB; 25 Jawhar Jordan RB (PS/I); 85 Josh Kelly WR; 49 Chad Muma LB; 50 Kenneth Murray LB; 70 James Neal III T; 36 George Odum S; 84 Bryce Oliver WR; 67 Max Pircher T (IPP); 31 Joshua Pitsenberger RB; 89 Daniel Sobkowicz WR; 58 Junior Tafuna DT; 26 Noah Whittington RB (PS/I); 37 Collin Wright CB; Reserve: 44 British Brooks RB (IR); 50 Solomon Byrd DE (IR); 97 Mario Edwards Jr. DT (IR); 95 Ali Gaye DE (IR); 76 Sam Hagen T (IR); 81 Jayden Higgins WR (IR); 92 Dylan Horton DE (IR); 33 Jake Hummel LB (IR/DFR); -- Graham Mertz QB (IR); 13 Jaylin Noel WR (IR); 52 K. C. Ossai LB (IR); 22 Jaylin Smith CB (IR/DFR); 45 E. J. Speed OLB (PUP) 53 active, 16 practice squad (1 IPP), 15 reserve As of November 13, 2026. Rookies in italics.; Roster; Depth chart; Transactions

=== NFL draft history ===
==== First-round draft picks by year ====
The Texans have had the top-overall pick in the NFL Draft three times.

=== Ring of Honor ===
On November 19, 2017, Andre Johnson was the first-ever inductee into the Texans Ring of Honor. On October 6, 2019, Bob McNair was posthumously the second inductee into the Texans Ring of Honor. On October 1, 2023, J. J. Watt was the third inductee into the Texans Ring of Honor. On November 2, 2025, Janice McNair was the fourth inductee into the Texans Ring of Honor.

Houston Texans Ring of Honor
No.	Inductee	Position	Tenure	Inducted
80	Andre Johnson	WR	2003–2014	November 19, 2017
—	Bob McNair	Owner / Founder	1999–2018	October 6, 2019
99	J. J. Watt	DE	2011–2020	October 1, 2023
—	Janice McNair	Co-Founder/ Senior Chair	1999–2024	November 2, 2025

=== Pro Football Hall of Fame ===
Only two members of the Pro Football Hall of Fame have spent any portion of their career with Texans, due in part to the requirements to be inducted and the Texans only having been established in 2002. In 2024, Andre Johnson became the first player to be inducted into the Hall of Fame primarily for his time with the Texans.

Houston Texans Hall of Famers
Inductee	Position	Tenure	Inducted
Ed Reed	S	2013	2019
Andre Johnson	WR	2003–2014	2024

== Staff and head coaches ==
=== Staff ===
Houston Texans staff
Front office: Owner/CEO/chairman – Cal McNair; President – Mike Tomon; Executive vice president/general manager – Nick Caserio; Executive vice president/general counsel – Greg Kondritz; Assistant GM – James Liipfert; Assistant GM – Chris Blanco; Director of player personnel – D. J. Debick; Director of college scouting – Mozique McCurtis; Director of pro scouting – Steve Cargile; Senior director of football administration – Andrew Brown; Senior Director of Football Research and Game Management – Frank Edgerly; Director of college scouting operations – Tom Hayden; Senior director of football technology and innovation – Tim Brog; Senior director of research and development – Russel Joyner; Director of football analytics – Kevin Clark; Head coaches: Head coach – DeMeco Ryans; Assistant head coach/running backs – Danny Barrett; Offensive coaches: Offensive coordinator – Nick Caley; Quarterbacks – Jerry Schuplinski; Wide receivers/offensive passing game coordinator – Ben McDaniels; Assistant wide receivers – Tiquan Underwood; Tight ends – James Ferentz; Offensive line/offensive run game coordinator – Cole Popovich; Offensive assistant – Alex Ward; Offensive assistant – Cole Weeks; Offensive assistant – Asauni Rufus; Offensive assistant – Taylor Embree	Defensive coaches: Defensive coordinator – Matt Burke; Defensive passing game coordinator – Cory Undlin; Defensive line/defensive run game coordinator – Rod Wright; Assistant defensive line – Frank Okam; Linebackers – Billy Davis; Defensive backs – Dino Vasso; Safeties – Stephen Adegoke; Senior defensive assistant – Bill Lazor; Defensive assistant – Mark Sheridan; Defensive assistant – Jay Simpson; Special teams coaches: Special teams coordinator – Frank Ross; Special teams/defensive assistant – Sean Baker; Assistant special teams – Will Burnham; Coaching operations/support staff: Assistant to the head coach – Jake Olson; Applied sports science: Director of applied sports science – Marc Lewis; Applied sports science coordinator – Cole Gardner; Applied sports science apprentice – Tyler Wang; Strength and conditioning: Head strength and conditioning – Mike Eubanks; Assistant strength and conditioning – Chris Cervantes; Assistant strength and conditioning – Joe Distor; Assistant strength and conditioning – Pat Moorer; → Coaching staff → Front office → More NFL staffs

=== Head coaches ===
The Texans have had six full-time head coaches in their franchise history. The team has had two interim head coaches.

Name	Tenure	Seasons	Record			Division titles
Name	Tenure	Seasons	W	L	T	Division titles
Dom Capers	2002–2005	4	18	46	0	0
Gary Kubiak	2006–2013	8	61	64	0	2
Wade Phillips	2013	Interim	0	3	0	0
Bill O'Brien	2014–2020	7	52	48	0	4
Romeo Crennel	2020	Interim	4	8	0	0
David Culley	2021	1	4	13	0	0
Lovie Smith	2022	1	3	13	1	0
DeMeco Ryans	2023–present	3	32	19	0	2

== Community ==
=== Traditions ===
- Battle Red Day – On Battle Red Day, the team wears the red alternate jerseys, and since 2007, red pants. Fans are encouraged to wear red to the game.
- Liberty White-Out – On Liberty White-Out Day One, the team wears the road white jerseys and white pants. Fans are encouraged to wear white to the game.
- Bull Pen – The sections behind the north end zone of NRG/Reliant Stadium are known as the Bull Pen. Some of the most avid Texans fans attend games in the Bull Pen and regular members have helped create and implement fan traditions, songs and chants, such as:
  - Holding up giant Texans jerseys while the visiting team's players are announced
  - Turning their backs on the opposing team after they score
  - Tailgating in the purple lot, the parking zone with the most barbecue for sale by fans and vendors
  - Gathering as a group for tailgating in the NW corner of the Platinum Lot of Reliant Stadium at the "Blue Crew" tailgate and conducting the Bull Pen Toast every game about 90 minutes before kickoff
  - Walking in the HEB Holiday Parade on Thanksgiving Day
  - Visiting the Bull Pen Pub for TORO Wraps, cheerleader autographs and to listen and dance with the Bull Pen Pep Band
- Bull Pen Pep Band – 45-member musical group that performs at all Houston Texans home games.
- Pre-Kickoff Tradition – Before each kickoff at a home game, the Texans run a short clip of a raging bull thrashing the opponent of the week to the AC/DC song "Thunderstruck".
- Player Introduction – When the players are introduced before the game, the announcer says the player's first name and the crowd yells out the last name (e.g. The announcer will say "Defensive End J. J..." and the crowd will yell out "WATT!!!").

=== Mascots and cheerleaders ===
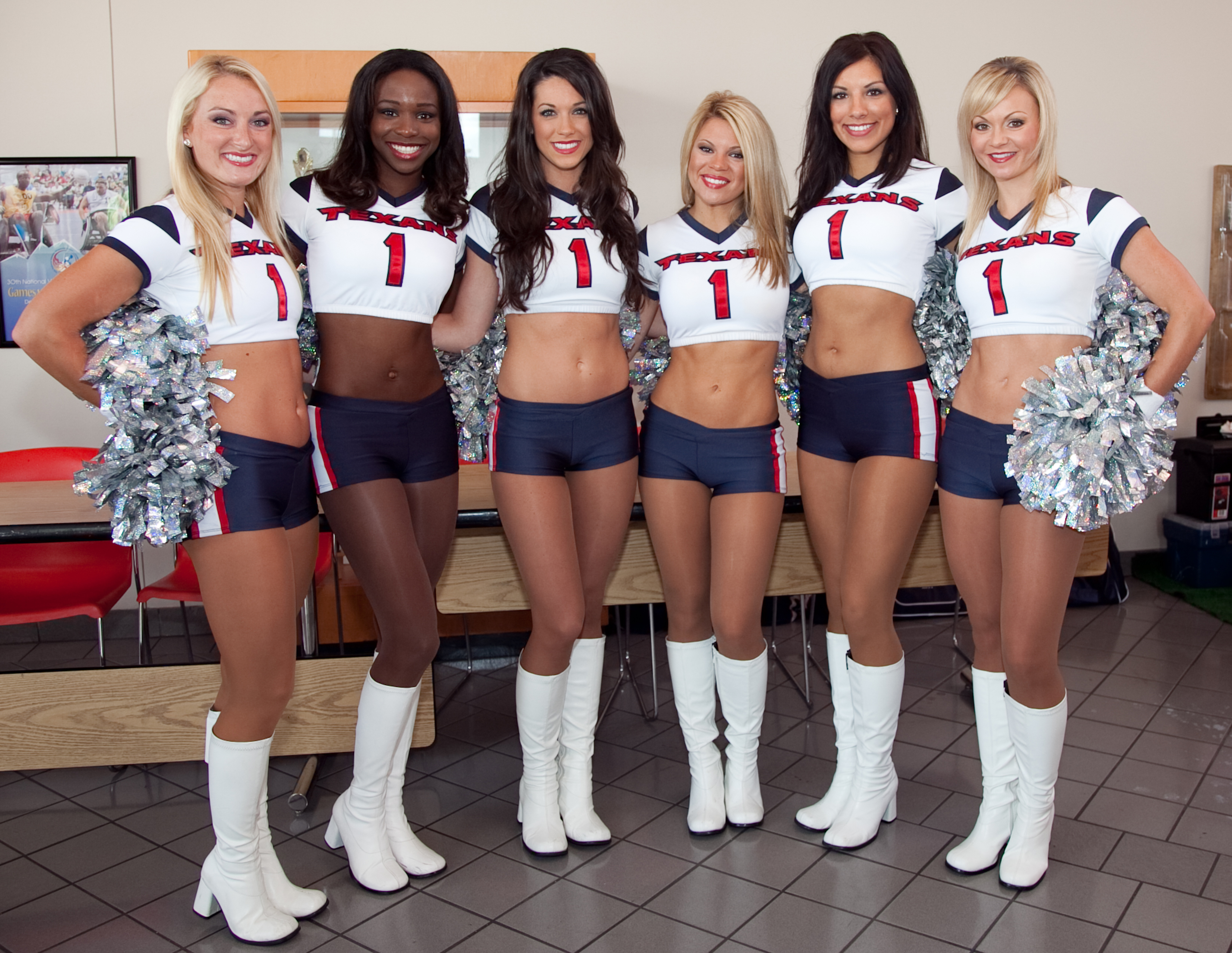
Houston Texans Cheerleaders

The team's official mascot is Toro, an anthropomorphic blue bull. The team also has a cheerleading squad named the Houston Texans Cheerleaders.

=== Community outreach ===
Community outreach by the Houston Texans is primarily operated by the Houston Texans Foundation, which works with community partners. The Houston Texans organization supports the character education program, Heart of a Champion. In 2017, the 15th annual Houston Texans Charity Golf Classic raised more than $380,000 for the foundation. More than $27.2 million has been raised for the foundation since its creation in 2002.

Former Texans DE J. J. Watt raised $41.6 million in relief funds for Hurricane Harvey after the storm devastated the city in 2017. Watt won the Walter Payton Man of the Year Award that season.

== Radio and television ==
As of 2023, the Texans' flagship radio stations were KILT SportsRadio 610AM and KILT 100.3FM. The AM station has an all-sports format, while the FM station plays contemporary country music. Both are owned by Audacy. Marc Vandermeer is the play-by-play announcer. Heisman Trophy winner Andre Ware provides color commentary, and SportsRadio 610 host Rich Lord serves as the sideline reporter. Preseason and regular season Monday night and Thursday night games from ESPN, Prime Video, and YouTube are telecast by KTRK, an ABC owned and operated station. Kevin Kugler calls the preseason games on TV, with former Texans defensive end N. D. Kalu providing color commentary.Most Regular season games (including Christmas games through Netflix) are aired over CBS affiliate KHOU, Fox affiliate KRIV if the Texans host an NFC team (plus games cross-flexed from CBS), and NBC affiliate KPRC for Sunday night games.

Spanish-language radio broadcasts of the team's games are aired on KGOL ESPN Deportes 1180AM. Enrique Vásquez is the play-by-play announcer. José Jojo Padrón provides color commentary, and Fernando Hernández serves as sideline reporter.

=== Radio affiliates ===
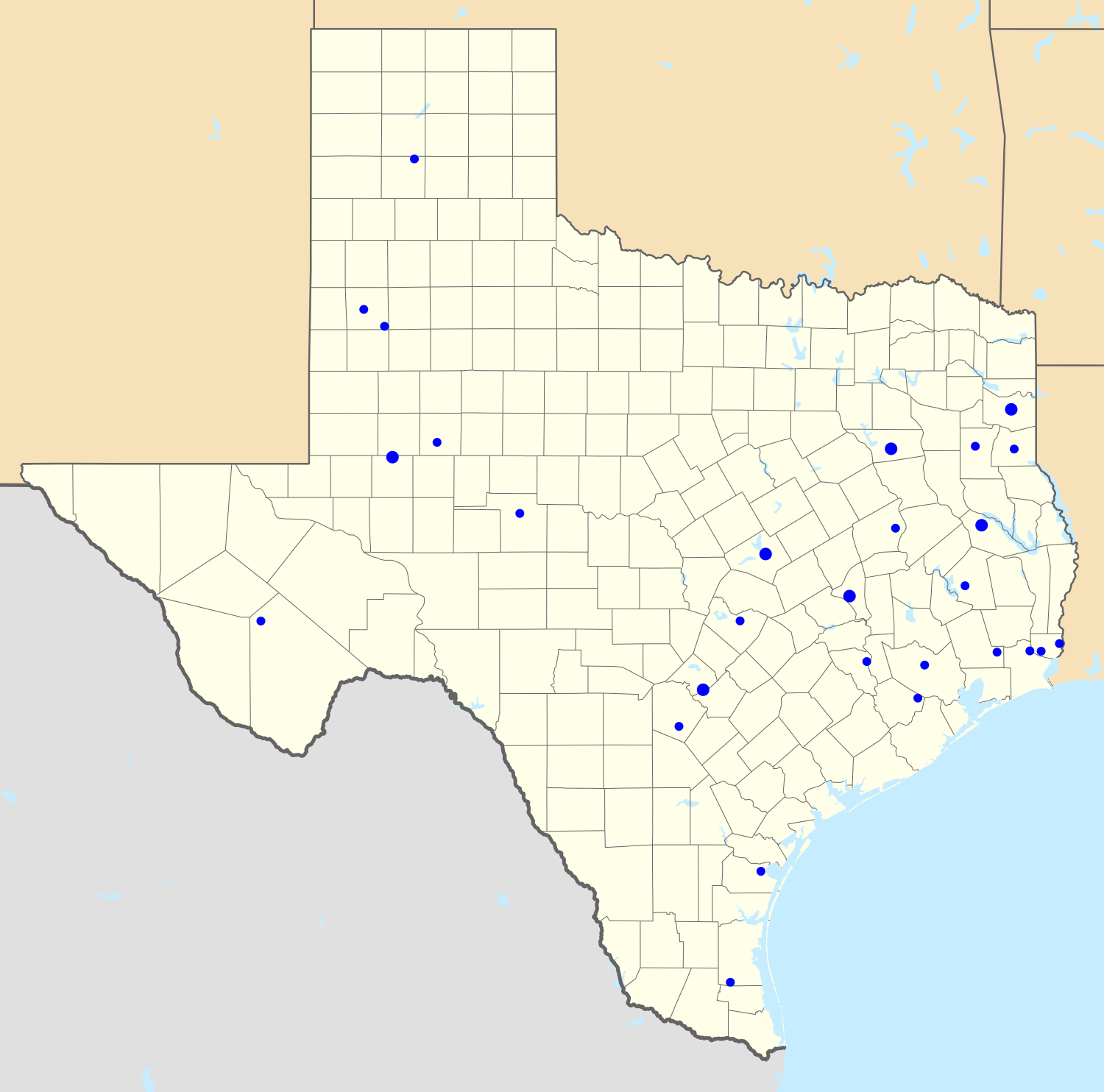
Map of radio affiliates.

Texans Radio Affiliates

City	Call sign	Frequency
Abilene	KMWX-FM	92.5 FM
Alpine	KVLF-AM	1240 AM
Amarillo	KIXZ	940 AM
Athens	KLVQ-AM	1410 AM
Austin	KVET-AM	1300 AM
Beaumont	KIKR-AM	1450 AM
Beaumont	KBED-AM	1510 AM
Big Spring	KBYG-AM	1400 AM
Brenham	KWHI-AM	1280 AM
Bryan	KZNE-AM	1150 AM
Carthage	KGAS-AM	1590 AM
College Station	KZNE-AM	1150 AM
Corpus Christi	KSIX-AM	1230 AM
Henderson	KWRD-AM	1470 AM
Houston	KILT-AM	610 AM
Houston	KILT-FM	100.3 FM
Levelland	KLVT-AM	1230 AM
Lubbock	KKCL-FM	98.1 FM
Lubbock	KKAM-AM	1340 AM (Bill O'Brien Show, only)
Lufkin	KSML-AM	1260 AM
Marble Falls	KBEY-FM	103.9 FM
Marshall	KMHT-AM	1450 AM
Marshall	KMHT-FM	103.9 FM
McAllen	KBUC-FM	102.1 FM
Nacogdoches	KSML-AM	1260 AM
New Braunfels	KGNB-AM	1420 AM
San Angelo	KKSA-AM	1260 AM
San Antonio	KZDC-AM	1250 AM
San Marcos	KGNB-AM	1420 AM
Tyler	KLVQ-AM	1410 AM
Wichita Falls	KSEY-AM	1230 AM
