= KBED =

Radio station in Nederland, Texas

Former simulcast with KIKR Beaumont
- Nederland, Texas; United States
- Broadcast area: Beaumont-Port Arthur area
- Frequency: 1510 kHz
- Branding: Sports Radio Beaumont

Programming
- Language: English
- Format: Sports
- Affiliations: Infinity Sports Network

Ownership
- Owner: Cumulus Media; (Cumulus Licensing LLC)
- Sister stations: KAYD-FM; KIKR; KQXY; KTCX

History
- First air date: February 20, 1969 (as KCAW Port Arthur)
- Last air date: March 7, 2025
- Former call signs: KCAW (1969–1974); KYKR (1974–1979); KEAM (1979–1989); KQXY (1989–1990); KDVE (1990–1991); KQHN (1991–2005)

Technical information
- Licensing authority: FCC
- Facility ID: 48917
- Class: D
- Power: 5,000 watts day
- Transmitter coordinates: 30°3′41.8″N 93°58′50.6″W

Links
- Public license information: Public file; LMS

KBED (1510 AM; branded as Sports Radio Beaumont) was a radio station serving the Beaumont-Port Arthur area with a sports format. It was under ownership of Cumulus Media; until going silent in 2025, it simulcast with sister station KIKR in Beaumont, Texas. Its studios were located on South Eleventh Street in Beaumont and its transmitter was located south of Vidor, Texas.

== History ==
KBED was initially proposed by Felix and James Joynt in 1959. The Joynts requested to obtain a construction permit to build a 1 kilowatt daytime broadcasting radio station at 1510 kHz, under the name KWEN Broadcasting on October 26, 1959, which was filed with the Federal Communications Commission (FCC) the following day. The proposed facility was constructed 3 miles northwest of 16th Street, on U.S. Highway 69 in Port Arthur, receiving a license to cover on February 20, 1969.

The facility was issued its first call sign KCAW, standing for country and western, on November 7, 1968. The Joynts would file to modify the location of the transmission site to a location on Texas State Highway 347, 0.7 miles northwest of 39th Street, which is where the facility signed on from in Port Arthur. That tower now is used as a cell site tower.

The transmitter was moved to its current South Vidor location (where its former FM sister KYKR-FM was located) when the FCC approved a power increase from 1,000 watts to 5,000 watts on August 1, 1980. Accompanied by the upgrade in ERP, the community of license was changed to Nederland. The callsign changed to KYKR, along with its FM sister 93.3, in 1974.

Eventually, owner Jimmie Joynt sold both the AM and FM to different owners. The AM station saw a couple of different owners (including Clear Channel Communications at one time) including various religious owners.

On January 4, 1988, the KYKR tower in South Vidor suffered a massive fire believed to be arson. Both 93.3 FM and 1510 AM transmitters were lost. KYKR struggled with borrowed equipment to make it back on the air at low power and eventually recovered.

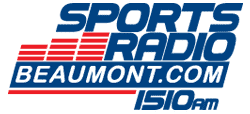
Previous logo

Because it shared the same frequency as clear-channel radio station WLAC in Nashville, Tennessee, KBED only broadcast during the daytime hours.

KBED, along with simulcast partner KIKR, went silent in March 2025. They were two of six Cumulus stations to close the weekend of March 7, as part of a larger shutdown of underperforming Cumulus stations. In March 2026, both stations turned in their licenses to the FCC. KBED's license was cancelled on March 9, 2026.
