= Joseph Ossai =

Nigerian American football player (born 2000)

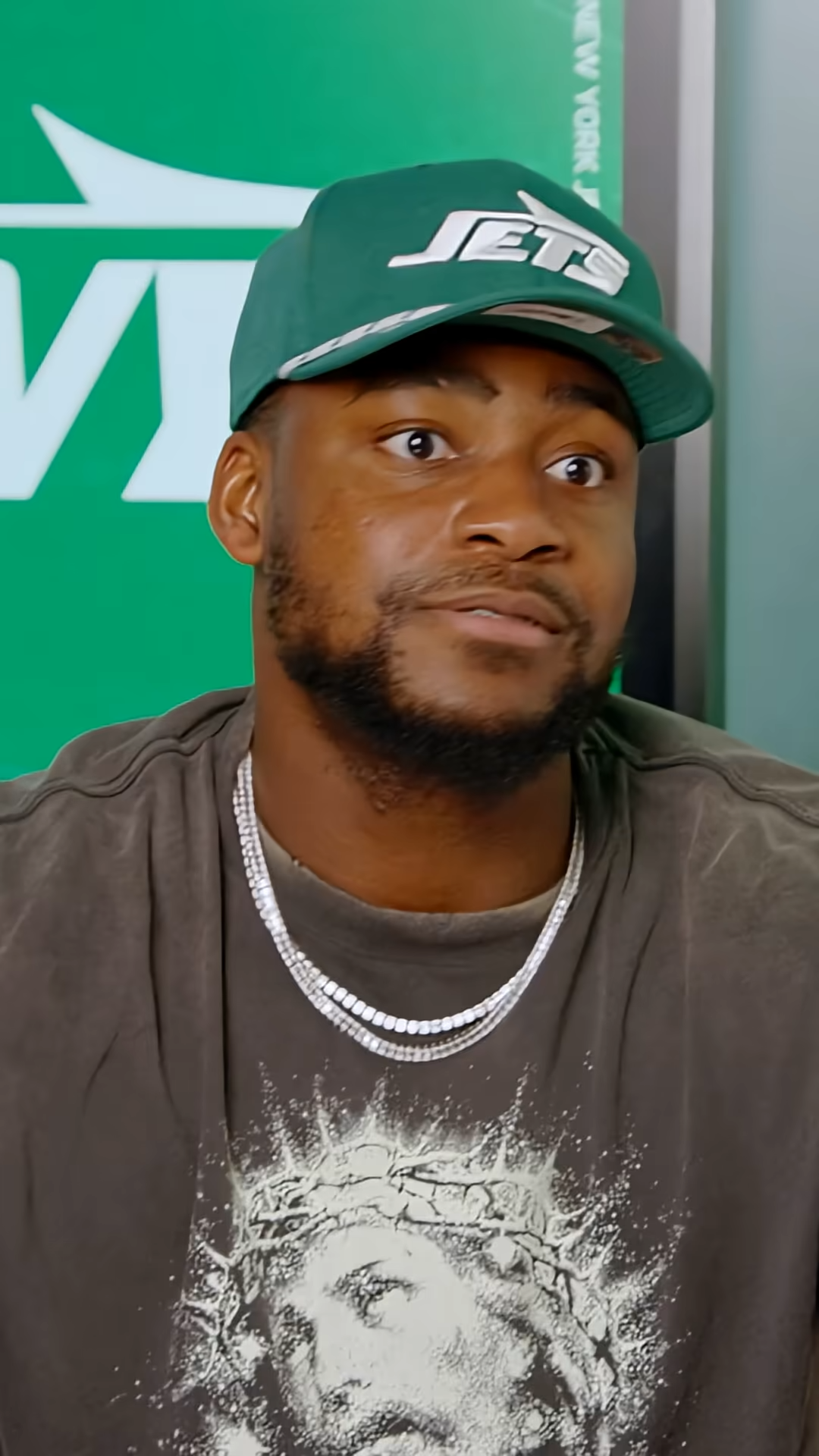
- Ossai with the New York Jets in 2026

No. 46 – New York Jets
- Position: Defensive end
- Roster status: Active

Personal information
- Born: 12 April 2000 (age 26); Lagos, Nigeria
- Listed height: 6 ft 4 in (1.93 m)
- Listed weight: 263 lb (119 kg)

Career information
- High school: Oak Ridge (Conroe, Texas, U.S.)
- College: Texas (2018–2020)
- NFL draft: 2021: 3rd round, 69th overall pick

Career history
- Cincinnati Bengals (2021–2025); New York Jets (2026–present)

Awards and highlights
- Consensus All-American (2020); First-team All-Big 12 (2020)

Career NFL statistics as of Week 10, 2026
- Total tackles: 125
- Sacks: 14.5
- Forced fumbles: 4
- Fumble recoveries: 2
- Pass deflections: 3
- Defensive touchdowns: 1
- Stats at Pro Football Reference

Joseph Ossai (born 12 April 2000) is a Nigerian professional American football defensive end for the New York Jets of the National Football League (NFL). He played college football for the Texas Longhorns, where he was a consensus All-American. He was selected by the Cincinnati Bengals in the third round of the 2021 NFL draft.

== Early life ==
Ossai was born in Ketu Ijaniki, Lagos, Nigeria, and lived there until his family moved to Conroe, Texas when he was 10.

He attended Oak Ridge High School, where he played basketball and football and was a two-time all-district and academic all-district honoree. As a senior, he recorded 58 tackles, eight sacks, 15 tackles for loss and three forced fumbles and was named first-team All-District 12-6A, and first-team All-Greater Houston by the Houston Chronicle. Ossai was rated a four-star recruit and committed to play college football at Texas over offers from Texas A&M, Notre Dame and Oregon.

== College career ==
In three seasons with the Longhorns, Ossai played in 36 games and made 24 starts, earning consensus All-America honors in 2020 with first-team recognition from the Associated Press, Football Writers Association of America and Walter Camp Football Foundation and second-team honors from the American Football Coaches Association and Sporting News. He was a finalist for the Lott IMPACT Trophy and a semifinalist for the Chuck Bednarik Award in 2020 and earned honorable mention as the Big 12 Conference Defensive Player of the Year and Defensive Lineman of the Year. He chose to forego the 2020 Alamo Bowl and his senior season to go pro.

As a true freshman, Ossai played in all 14 of the Longhorns' games with two starts and made 20 total tackles with one a sack and a forced fumble.

He led the team with 62 tackles in his sophomore season while also recording five sacks, two interceptions, one pass broken up, one forced fumble and also blocked a kick. In the postseason, he was the 2019 Alamo Bowl Defensive MVP. In the following spring, he made the Big 12 Commissioner’s Honor Roll.

Ossai was named to the Bronko Nagurski Trophy, Chuck Bednarik Award and Lott IMPACT Trophy watchlists entering his junior season. That year, he had 55 tackles, 15.5 tackles for loss, and 5 sacks on his way to being named first team All Big-12 and an All-American. On 14 December 2020, Ossai announced his decision to enter the 2021 NFL draft, choosing to forgo Texas' 2020 Bowl game and his senior season.

== Professional career ==
Pre-draft measurables
Height	Weight	Arm length	Hand span	Wingspan	40-yard dash	10-yard split	20-yard split	Vertical jump	Broad jump	Bench press
6 ft 3 3/4 in (1.92 m)	256 lb (116 kg)	33 7/8 in (0.86 m)	9 3/8 in (0.24 m)	6 ft 8 5/8 in (2.05 m)	4.62 s	1.58 s	2.56 s	41.5 in (1.05 m)	10 ft 11 in (3.33 m)	19 reps
All values from Pro Day

=== Cincinnati Bengals ===
Ossai was selected by the Cincinnati Bengals in the third round (69th overall) of the 2021 NFL draft. He signed his four-year rookie contract on 2 June 2021. Ossai suffered a meniscus injury in the second preseason game. He was placed on injured reserve on 31 August 2021, ending his season.

In 2022, Ossai was named the backup right defensive end, behind Trey Hendrickson on the depth chart. He made his NFL debut in the Bengals' 2022 regular season opener against the Pittsburgh Steelers. In Week 18 against the Baltimore Ravens, he recovered a fumble for a touchdown in the 27–16 victory. He appeared in 16 regular season games and recorded 3.5 sacks, 17 total tackles, one pass defended, and two fumble recoveries. In the AFC Championship Game against the Kansas City Chiefs, Ossai committed an unnecessary roughness penalty with eight seconds left in regulation on quarterback Patrick Mahomes resulting in a 15-yard penalty and much closer field goal attempt (45-yards) which kicker Harrison Butker converted to advance to the Super Bowl.

In 2023, Ossai returned to his role as a substitute defensive end for the season, once again behind Hendrickson on the right side. He recorded his first sack of the season in Week 13 against the Jacksonville Jaguars.

In 2024, Ossai remained healthy and played in all 17 games, recording his first 3 career starts filling in for the injured Sam Hubbard and playing a career-high number of snaps. He recorded one deflected pass, his first 2 career forced fumbles, career-highs in sacks (5), tackles (26), tackles for loss (4) and QB hits (15).

On March 14, 2025, Ossai re-signed with the Bengals on a one-year contract.

=== New York Jets ===
On March 12, 2026, Ossai signed a three-year, $36 million contract with the New York Jets.

== NFL career statistics ==
Legend
**Bold**	Career high

=== Regular season ===
Year	Team	Games		Tackles						Interceptions						Fumbles			
Year	Team	GP	GS	Cmb	Solo	Ast	Sck	TFL	Sfty	PD	Int	Yds	Avg	Lng	TD	FF	FR	Yds	TD
2021	CIN	DNP																	
2022	CIN	16	0	17	6	11	3.5	2	0	**1**	0	0	0.0	0	0	0	**2**	0	**1**
2023	CIN	14	0	10	6	4	1.0	1	0	**1**	0	0	0.0	0	0	0	0	0	0
2024	CIN	17	3	**46**	**26**	20	**5.0**	4	0	**1**	0	0	0.0	0	0	**2**	0	0	0
2025	CIN	14	9	43	21	**22**	**5.0**	**9**	0	0	0	0	0.0	0	0	**2**	0	0	0
2026	NYJ	4	0	9	5	4	0.0	0	0	0	0	0	0.0	0	0	0	0	0	0
Career		65	12	125	64	61	14.5	16	0	3	0	0	0.0	0	0	4	2	0	1

=== Playoffs ===
Year	Team	Games		Tackles						Interceptions						Fumbles			
Year	Team	GP	GS	Cmb	Solo	Ast	Sck	TFL	Sfty	PD	Int	Yds	Avg	Lng	TD	FF	FR	Yds	TD
2022	CIN	3	0	6	4	2	0.0	1	0	2	0	0	0.0	0	0	0	0	0	0
Career		3	0	6	4	2	0.0	1	0	2	0	0	0.0	0	0	0	0	0	0

== Personal life ==
His younger brother, K. C. Ossai, is a linebacker for the Houston Texans.
