= KCOL =

KCOL may refer to:

- KCOL (AM), a radio station (600 AM) licensed to Wellington, Colorado, United States
- KCOL-FM, a radio station (92.5 FM) licensed to Groves, Texas, United States
