= KIOC =

Coordinates: 30.156°N 93.986°W

- Orange, Texas; United States
- Broadcast area: Golden Triangle (Texas)
- Frequency: 106.1 MHz
- Branding: Big Dog 106

Programming
- Language: English
- Format: Mainstream rock
- Affiliations: Premium Choice; iHeartRadio

Ownership
- Owner: iHeartMedia; (iHM Licenses, LLC)
- Sister stations: KCOL-FM; KKMY; KYKR; KLVI

History
- First air date: June 23, 1978; 47 years ago
- Call sign meaning: IOC resembles 106

Technical information
- Licensing authority: FCC
- Facility ID: 33060
- Class: C0
- ERP: 100,000 watts
- HAAT: 326 meters (1,070 ft)

Links
- Public license information: Public file; LMS
- Webcast: Listen live (via iHeartRadio)
- Website: bigdog106.iheart.com

KIOC (106.1 FM) is a mainstream rock–formatted radio station in Beaumont, Texas. It serves the entire Golden Triangle region and is owned by iHeartMedia, Inc. Its studios are located southeast of the I-10–US 69 interchange in Beaumont, and its transmitter is located in Vidor, Texas.

== History ==
=== The Birth of "K106" ===
KIOC was founded by Ken Stevens. The facility was built in 1977 and signed on over the air June 23, 1978, as "K106". Programming was the Drake Chenault CHR / Top40 format before moving to adult contemporary in the early 80s. Its one and only antenna site has been on the side of the Channel 4 (KJAC, now KBTV) tower in Vidor, Texas, making 106.1 the highest FM (~1000 ft) in the immediate Golden Triangle (not counting the rimshots to the west trying to program for the Houston market).

During the late 80s and early 90s, KIOC was locked in a fierce Top 40 battle with crosstown KZZB ("B95").

On November 26, 1991, B95 went silent after its new owner bankrupted it. Gulf Star (owned by Steven Hicks of the Hicks Broadcast family from Beaumont) bought the silent 95.1 and eventually took on KYKR-FM's country music format after GulfStar sold the former 93.3, KYKR's home for decades to Tichenor Broadcasting who wanted to use it as a Houston station, leaving K106 as Southeast Texas' CHR standard bearer.

=== K106 Becomes the Golden Triangle's "Big Dog" ===
In October 1993, K106 moved in a rock-based top 40 direction, using the slogan "all rock, no rap." After briefly taking on an alternative rock format and returning to Top 40 as "Hot 106" in February 1997, KIOC became "Big Dog 106" in 1997.

Former DJ's on the station included Mark Landis & The Nut Hut (mornings), Pam (Hoose) Pace (mid-days), Jack "Dangerous" Daniels (afternoons), Steven Wild "The Love Child" (evenings), Angel Sonnier (overnights), Skid Marxx (Shon Hodgkinson, promotions director), Michelle (Blake) Hinch, Derek Hayes, Slade Ham, Chris Chambers (Ken Rojas), Cort Crusher (Cort Kennedy), Mikey Mike, Lisa Daniels, Kurt (Johnson) Kruzer, Tad Vincent (Tad Licatino), John T the Crazy Canadian, Mike Davis, Debbie Wylde, Candi, Joey Armstrong, Spot, Eli Fox, Patrick Sanders and Jay Kelly.

In 2009, KIOC adopted Clear Channel's Premium Choice Active rock format, becoming musically identical outside of morning drive to several of its rock and alternative sister stations.
