= Houston Texans Cheerleaders =

Official cheerleading squad of the Houston Texans professional football team

- Established: 2002; 24 years ago
- Members: 35
- Director: Casey Potter
- Affiliations: Houston Texans
- Website: www.houstontexans.com/cheerleaders/index.html

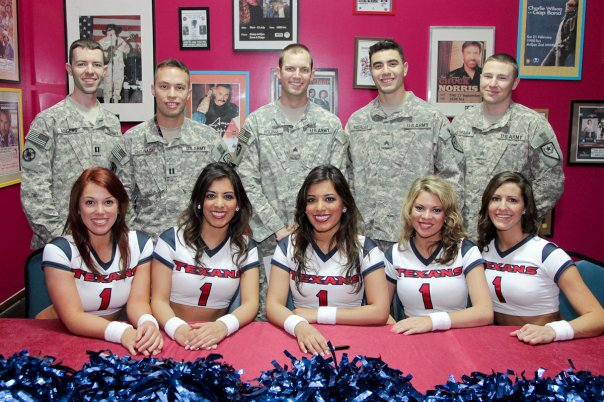
Houston Texan cheerleaders pose with US Soldier deployed to Camp Arifjan, Kuwait during a USO tour in 2010.

The Houston Texans Cheerleaders are the official cheerleading squad of the Houston Texans of the National Football League. Although they are marketed as cheerleaders, they are actually a dance team. The group has been with the team since the team's inception in 2002. The squad's tryouts were held at the Methodist Training Center from 2002 to 2019. Since 2021, the squad hold auditions at the local gym called Texans Fit. The group currently has 35 members. Yearly, the squad releases a swimsuit calendar, having done so since 2008-2016. Currently they release as "sideline calendar" which features pictures of the cheerleaders on their game day activities.

The squad also makes off-the-field appearances at charity events and parties. In 2011, the squad held a "Birds and Birdies" Golf Tournament at Cypresswood Golf Club. Also in 2011, the squad had a HTC All Stars Group, before a game against the Carolina Panthers, in which cheerleaders from across Houston got together to perform at the "Happy Holidays Show". The squad also act as mentors to young girls in the Houston area via the Junior Cheerleader program and are one of the major advocates in Houston for female empowerment.

== Gallery ==
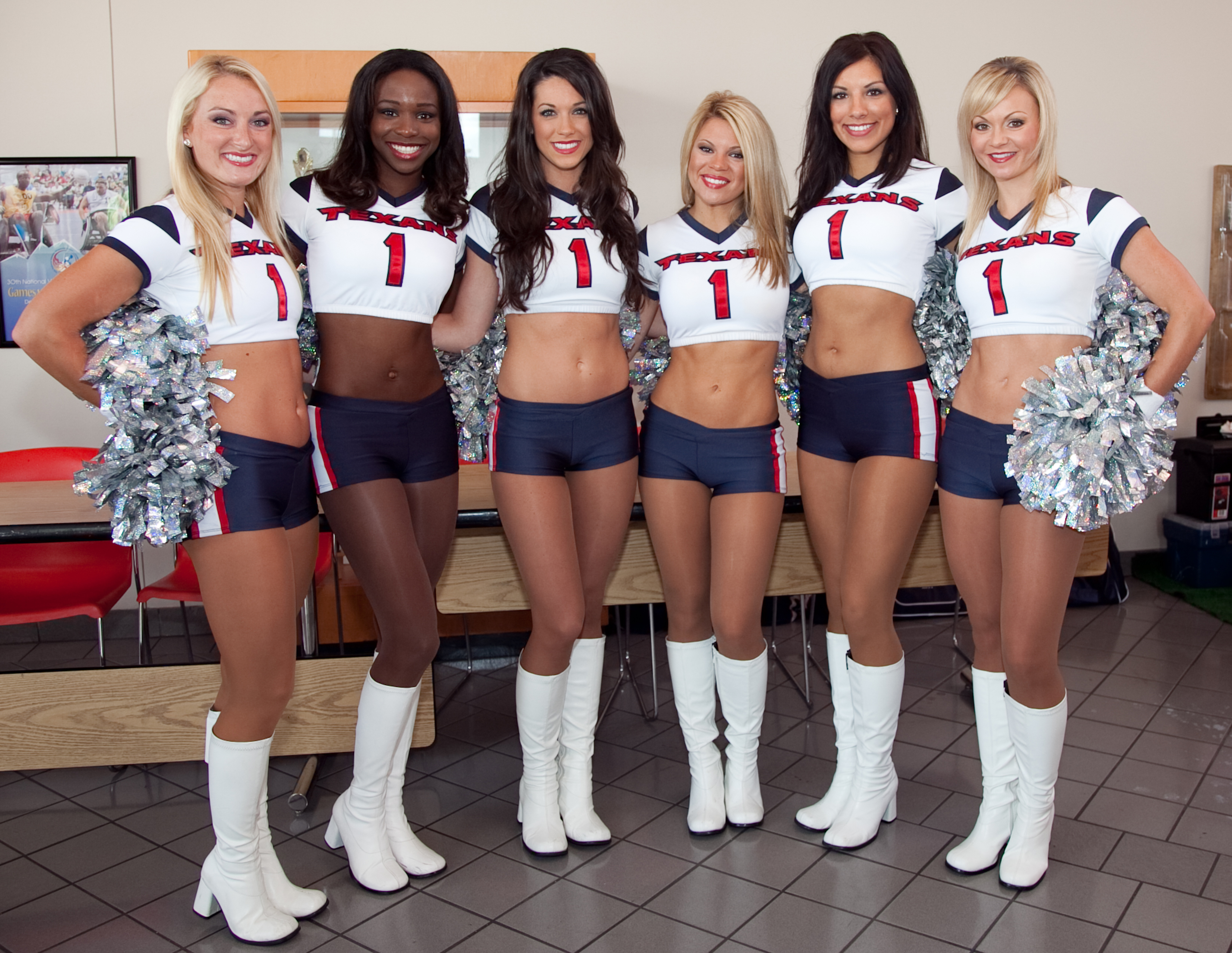

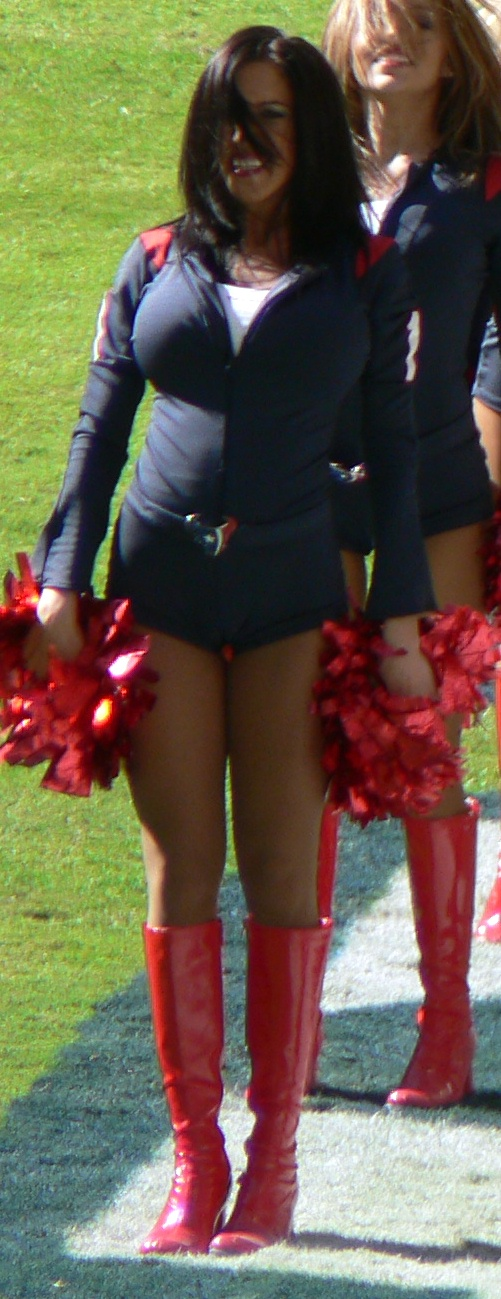

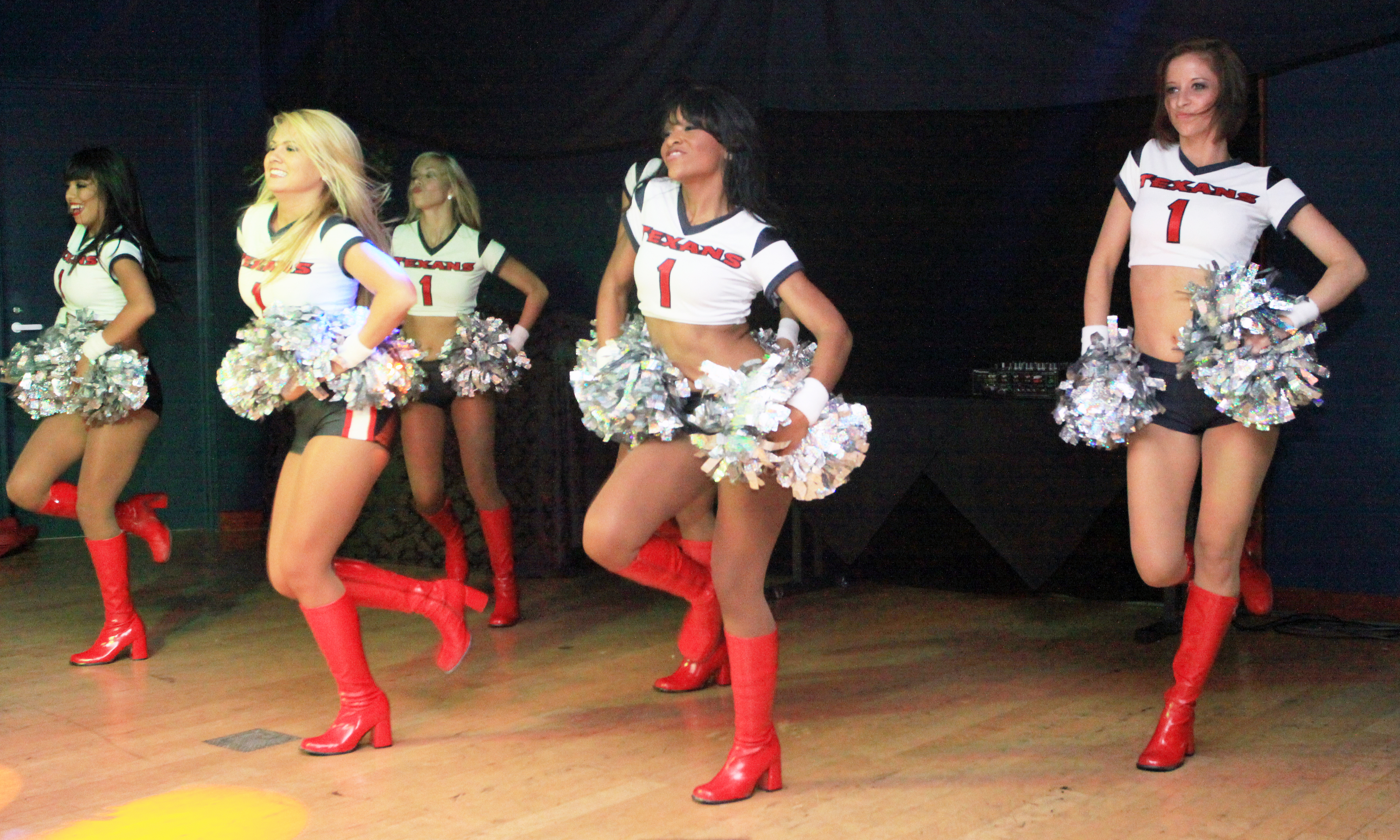

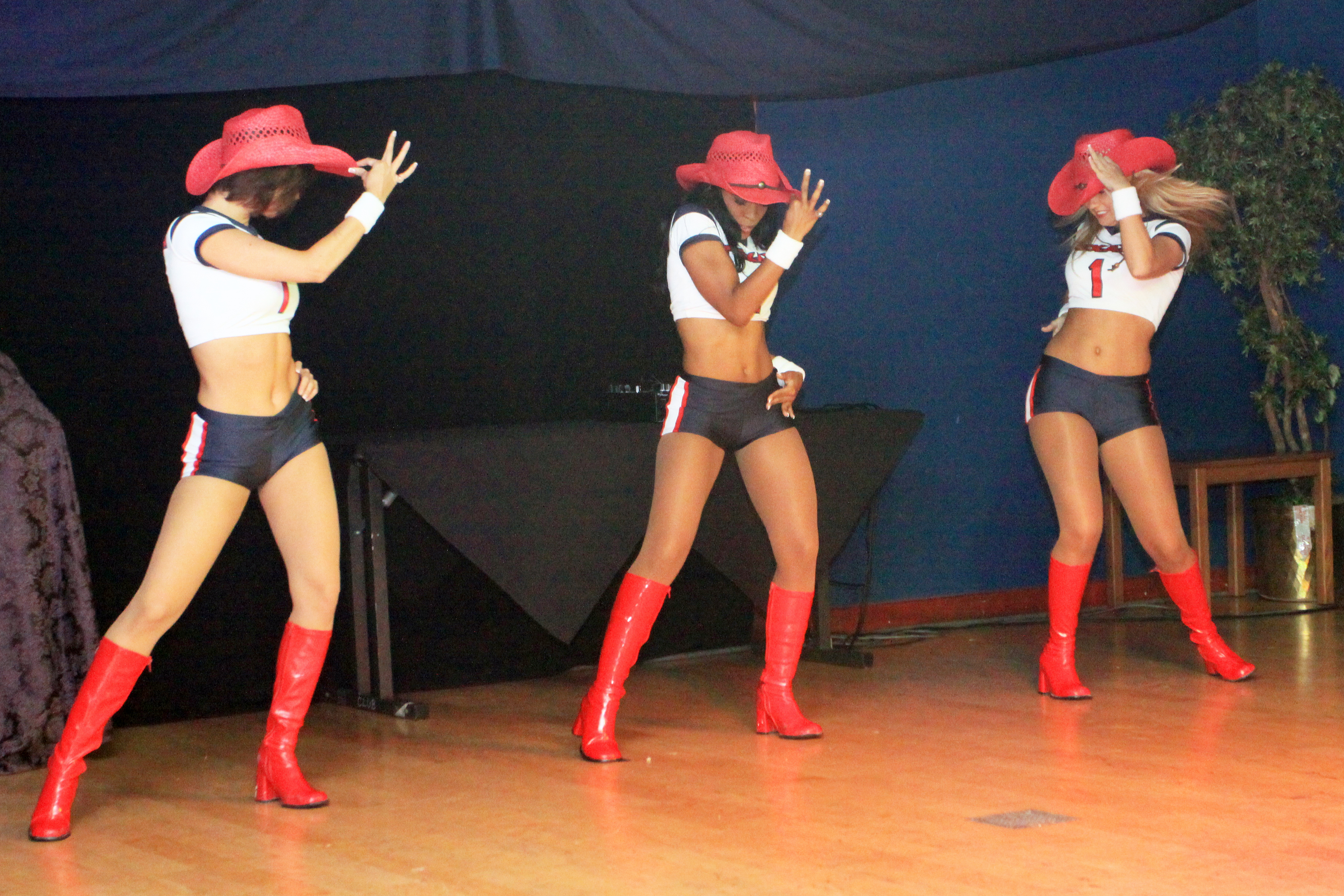

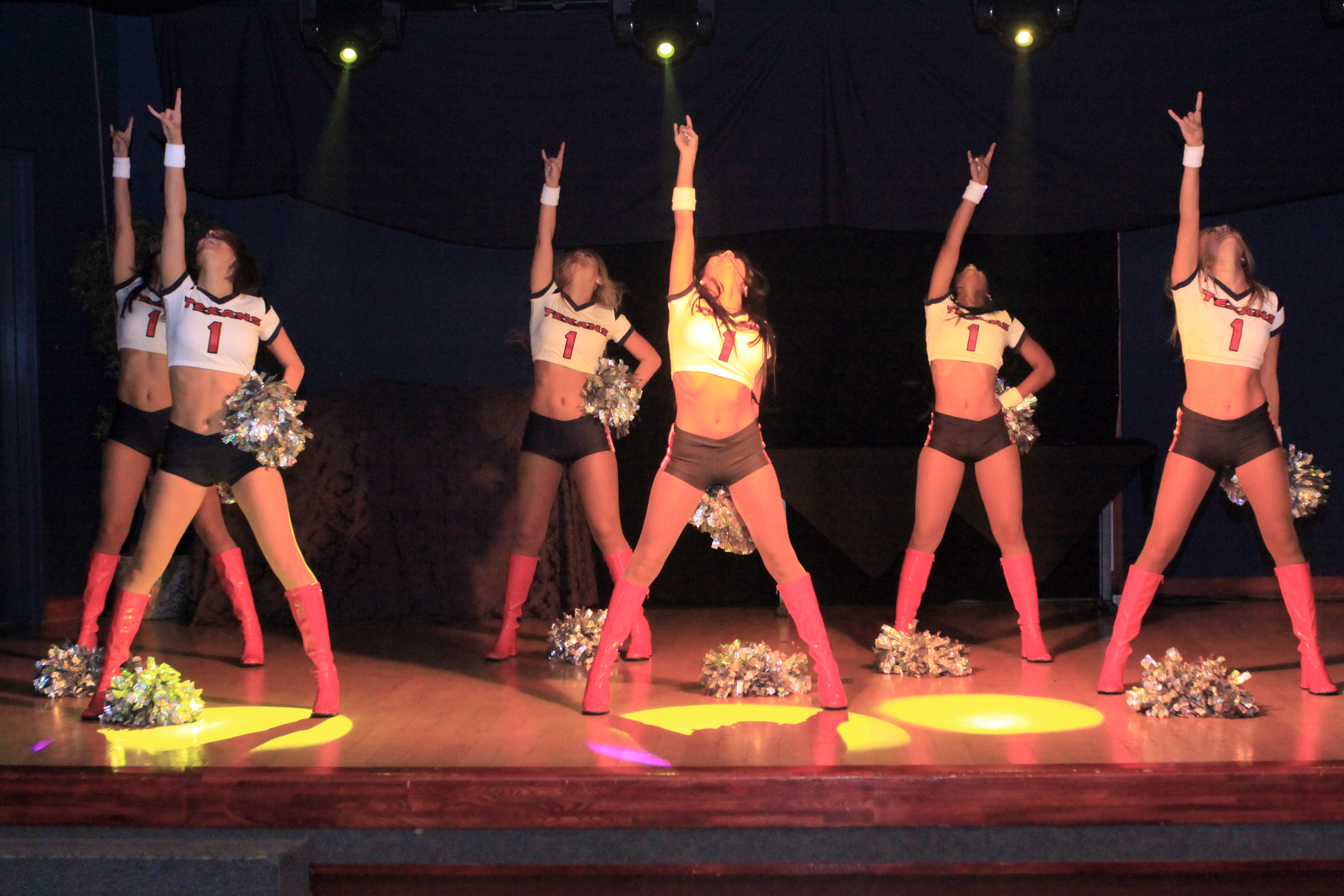

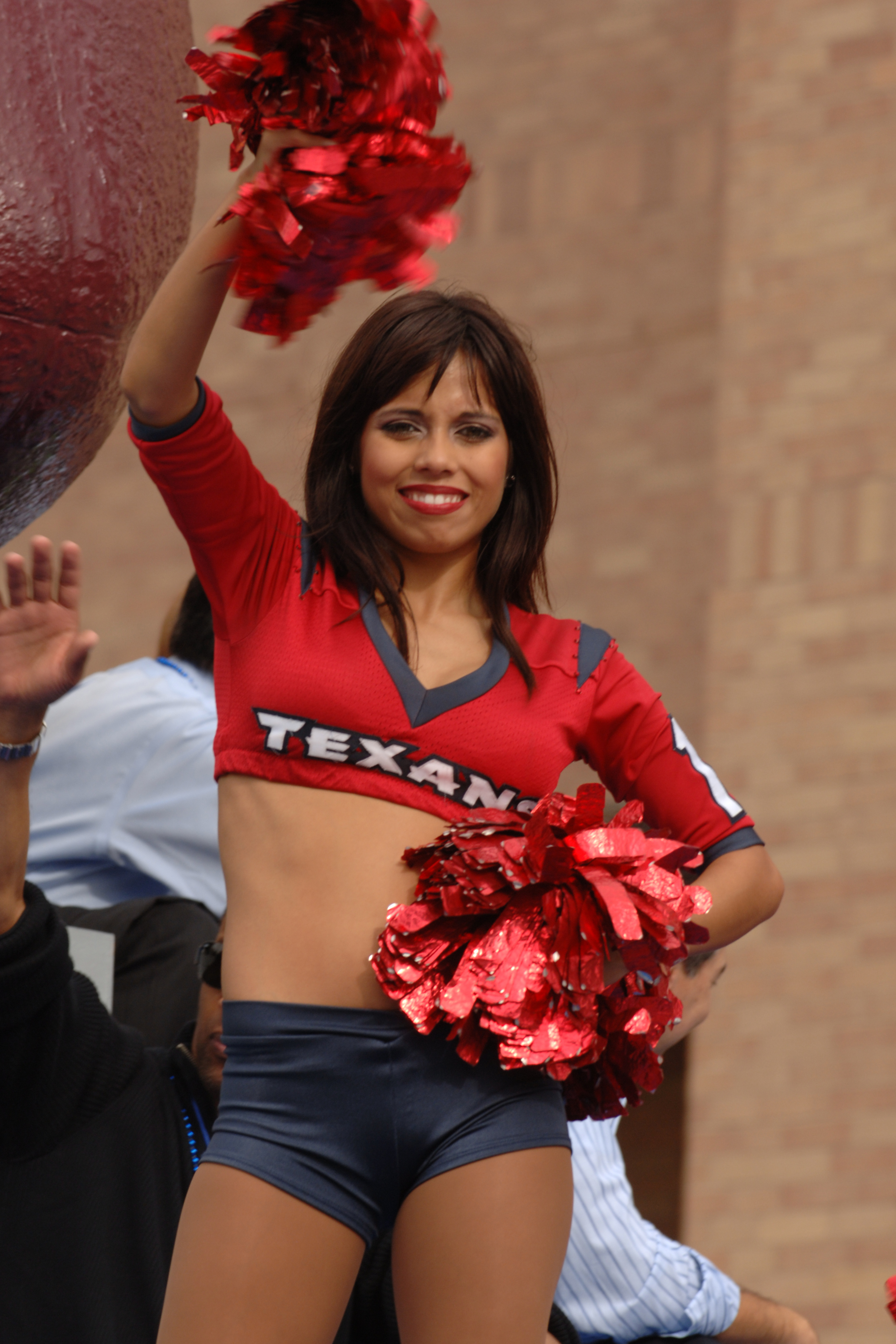

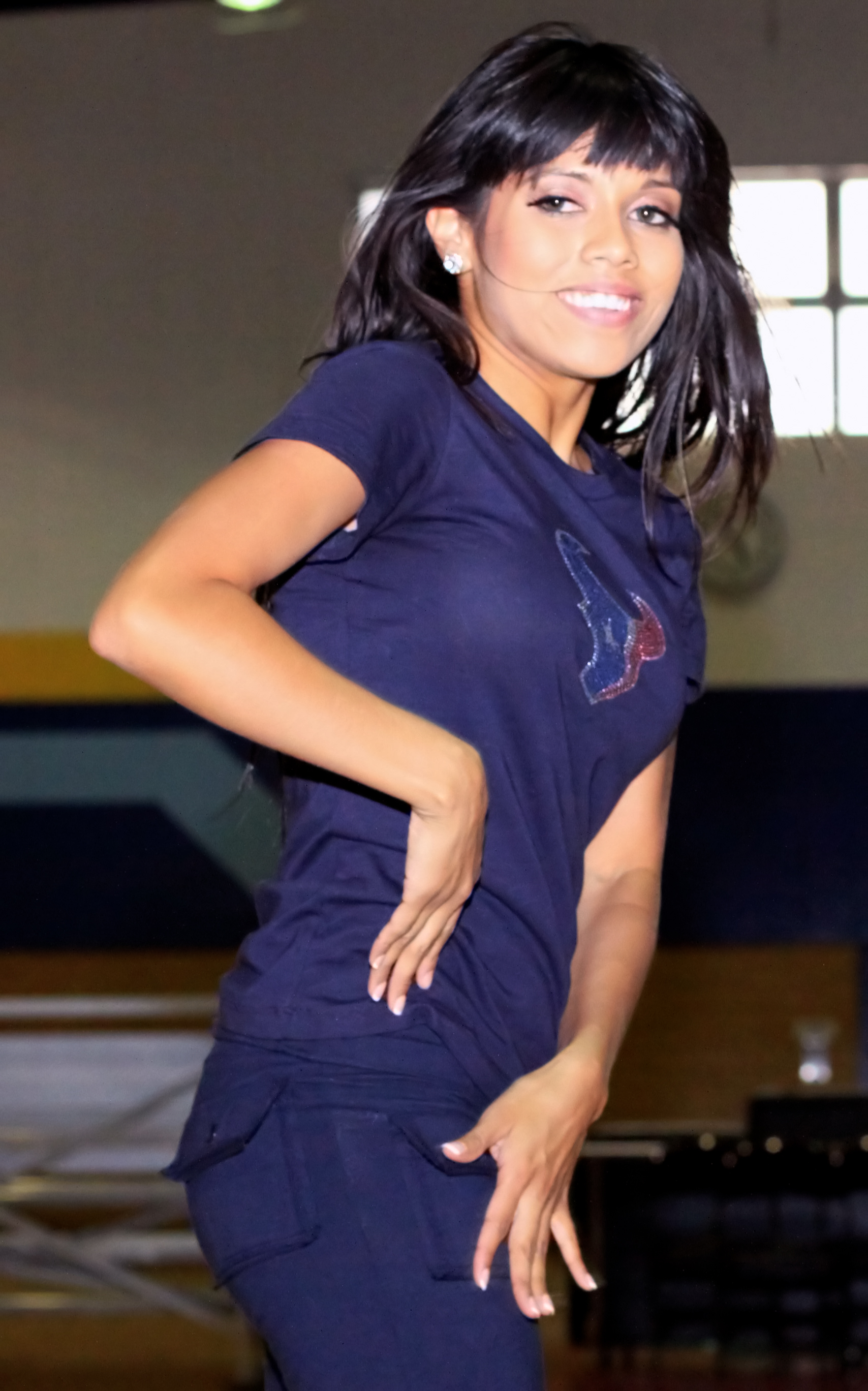

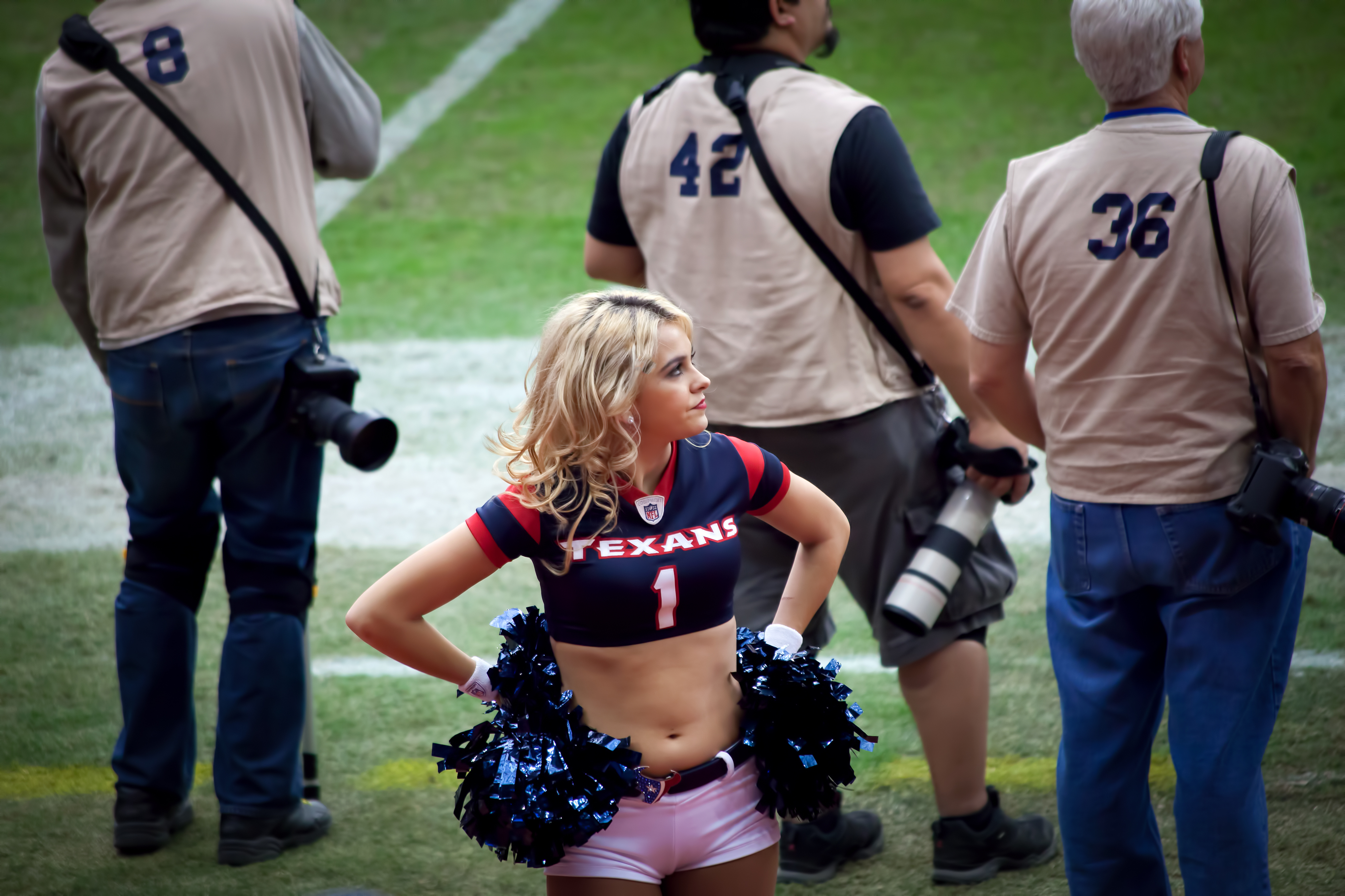

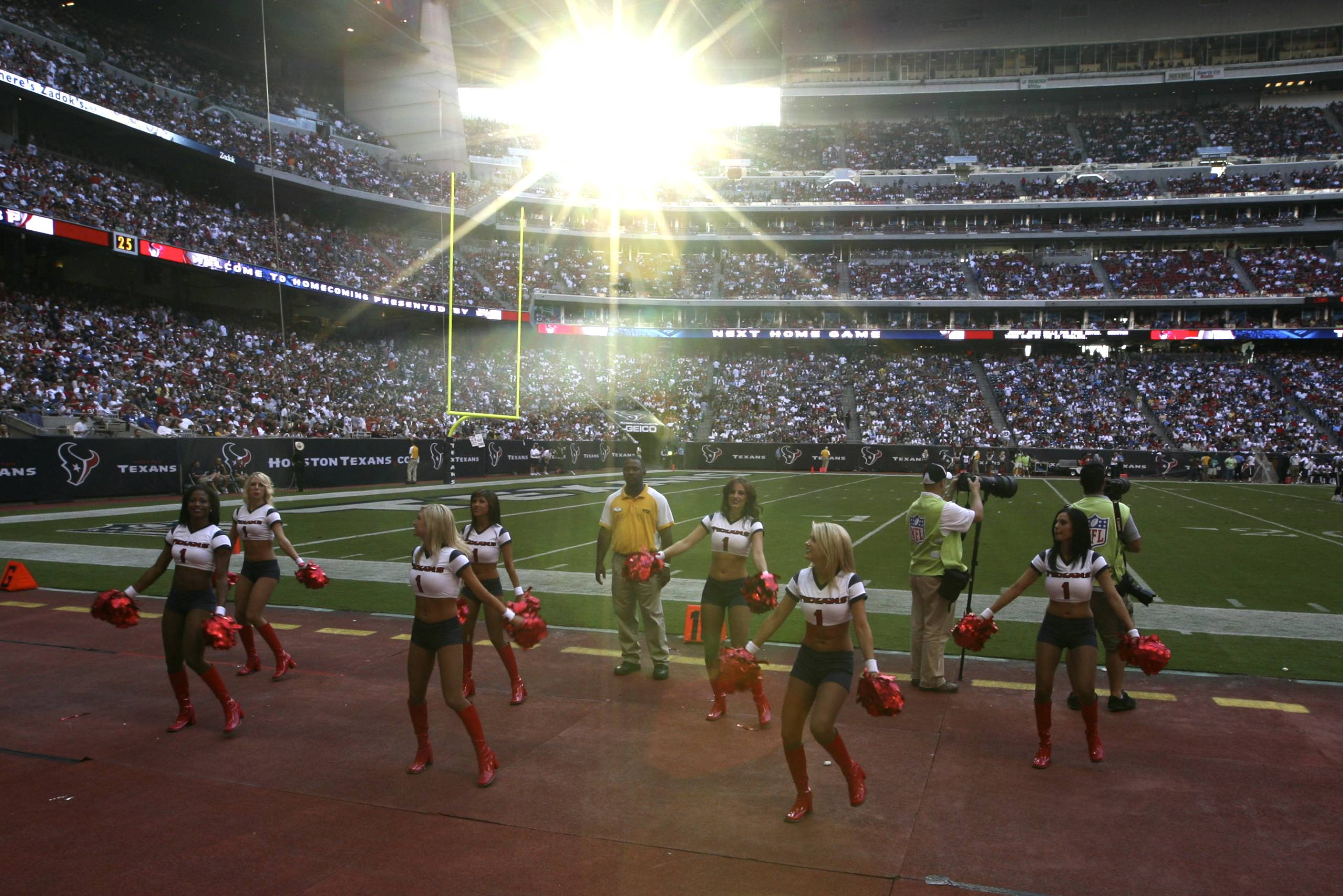
