= Bull Pen Pep Band =

45-member musical group

The Bull Pen Pep Band is a 45-member musical group that performs at all home games for the Houston Texans franchise of the National Football League. The group is led by Lamar Burkhalter (founder of Houston group Percussion-One). The band plays at home games and various other marketing, promotional and community outreach events sponsored by the Texans throughout the year. The band is located in the Bull Pen section of NRG Stadium.

== Group background ==
The Pep Band first performed in April 2002 at the Texans Draft Day Event.

The instrumentation in the Pep Band consists of a Brass Line, Drum Line and Combo Group. Among the instruments used in the band include:

- Bass Drum
- Cymbals
- Mellophone
- Snare Drum
- Tenor Drum
- Trombone
- Trumpet
- Tuba

== Traditions ==
The Bull Pen Pep Band has many traditions and scheduled performances during gameday. They include:

- Marching in the parking lots with the tailgaters 3–4 hours prior to kickoff.
- Assembling in Budweiser Plaza for a 15-minute performance 1 hour prior to kickoff.
- Marching with the Bull Pen into the stadium and Taking their seats in the Bull Pen 45 minutes before kickoff.
- Playing between the first and second and third and fourth quarter breaks along with various time outs.
- Performing the "5th Quarter" at the end of the game, which consists of the band marching through the Main Concourse playing songs with a large group of fans that march and dance along with them.
- Occasionally performing during the pregame or halftime entertainment of the game.
