= K. C. Ossai =

American football player (born 2002)

No. 52 – Houston Texans
- Position: Linebacker
- Roster status: Injured reserve

Personal information
- Born: November 5, 2002 (age 24); Conroe, Texas, U.S.
- Listed height: 6 ft 1 in (1.85 m)
- Listed weight: 240 lb (109 kg)

Career information
- High school: Oak Ridge
- College: Louisiana (2021–2024)
- NFL draft: 2025: undrafted

Career history
- Houston Texans (2025)*; Miami Dolphins (2025)*; Houston Texans (2026–present)
- * Offseason or practice squad member only
- Stats at Pro Football Reference

K. C. Ossai (born November 5, 2002) is an American football linebacker for the Houston Texans of the National Football League (NFL). He played college football for the Louisiana Ragin' Cajuns.

== Early life ==
Ossai attended Oak Ridge High School in Montgomery County, Texas. He initially committed to play college football for the Arizona Wildcats. However, Ossai flipped his commitment and sign to play for the Louisiana Ragin' Cajuns.

== College career ==
As a freshman in 2021, Ossai notched five tackles in 11 games. During the 2022 season, he recorded 63 tackles with two going for a loss. In the 2023 season, Ossai posted 95 tackles with four and a half being for a loss, a sack, two forced fumbles, and a fumble recovery. As a senior in 2024, he led the team with 115 tackles and an interception.

== Professional career ==
Pre-draft measurables
Height	Weight	Arm length	Hand span	Wingspan	40-yard dash	10-yard split	20-yard split	20-yard shuttle	Three-cone drill	Vertical jump	Broad jump	Bench press
6 ft 1 1/8 in (1.86 m)	237 lb (108 kg)	33 in (0.84 m)	9 5/8 in (0.24 m)	6 ft 6 in (1.98 m)	4.68 s	1.57 s	2.63 s	4.56 s	7.38 s	39.5 in (1.00 m)	10 ft 6 in (3.20 m)	22 reps
All values from Pro Day

=== Houston Texans ===
After not being selected in the 2025 NFL draft, Ossai signed with the Houston Texans as an undrafted free agent. On August 25, 2025, he was waived during final rosters cuts, but re-signed to the team's practice squad two days later. On September 3, Ossai was released from the team's practice squad.

=== Miami Dolphins ===
On December 9, 2025, Ossai signed to the Miami Dolphins' practice squad. On May 4, 2026, he was released by the Dolphins.

=== Houston Texans (second stint) ===
On May 26, 2026, Ossai signed with the Houston Texans. He was placed on season–ending injured reserve on August 22.

== Personal life ==
Ossai is the younger brother of NFL defensive end, Joseph Ossai. and CFL defensive end, Philip Ossai.
