= KCOL-FM =

- Groves, Texas; United States
- Broadcast area: Beaumont/Port Arthur
- Frequency: 92.5 MHz (HD Radio)
- Branding: Cool 92.5

Programming
- Language: English
- Format: Classic hits

Ownership
- Owner: iHeartMedia, Inc.; (iHM Licenses, LLC)
- Sister stations: KYKR, KIOC, KKMY, KLVI

History
- First air date: July 10, 1986 (as KTFA at 92.1)
- Former call signs: KTFA (1983–2001)
- Former frequencies: 92.1 MHz (1986–1990)
- Call sign meaning: "Cool"

Technical information
- Licensing authority: FCC
- Facility ID: 70443
- Class: C2
- ERP: 31,000 watts
- HAAT: 131 meters (430 ft)
- Transmitter coordinates: 30°01′45.00″N 93°52′59.00″W

Links
- Public license information: Public file; LMS
- Webcast: Listen live (via iHeartRadio)
- Website: cool925.iheart.com

KCOL-FM (92.5 FM, "Cool 92.5") is an American radio station broadcasting a classic hits format. Licensed to the suburb of Groves, Texas, it serves the Beaumont-Port Arthur metropolitan area. Its studios are located south of Dowlen near Parkdale Mall in Beaumont, and its transmitter is located in Bridge City, Texas.

== History ==
Voice in the Wilderness Broadcasting was granted a construction permit to build a 3 kilowatt Class A radio facility on 92.1 MHz in 1983. The permit was assigned the call sign KTFA on June 27, 1983. KTFA was upgraded to the current 50 kilowatt C2 class in 1990, which involved a change in frequency to 92.5, so as not to interfere with KRTS in the Houston area. The station has had only two owners in its lifetime, having been proposed, built, and initially licensed to Voice in the Wilderness, and currently owned by iHeartMedia, Inc.

== HD Radio ==
KCOL-FM HD2 broadcasts a country love songs format which is also available on the iHeartRadio app.
