= KQXY-FM =

- Beaumont, Texas; United States
- Frequency: 94.1 MHz
- Branding: Q94

Programming
- Language: English
- Format: Top 40 (CHR)

Ownership
- Owner: Cumulus Media; (Cumulus Licensing LLC)
- Sister stations: KAYD-FM, KTCX

History
- First air date: January 3, 1967 (as KLVI-FM)
- Former call signs: KLVI-FM (January 3, 1967-September 1, 1967); KBPO (September 1, 1967-September 15, 1976)
- Call sign meaning: The Q from KQXY is used in Q94 branding (The Y was used in Y94 brand as previous Adult Contemporary format)

Technical information
- Licensing authority: FCC
- Facility ID: 48918
- Class: C1
- ERP: 100,000 watts
- HAAT: 183 meters (600 ft)
- Transmitter coordinates: 30°06′56.00″N 94°00′0.00″W

Links
- Public license information: Public file; LMS
- Webcast: Listen live
- Website: kqxy.com

KQXY-FM (94.1 MHz, "Q94") is a radio station broadcasting a top 40 (CHR) format. Licensed to Beaumont, Texas, it serves the Beaumont/Port Arthur metropolitan area. It first began broadcasting under the call sign KLVI-FM in 1967. The station is currently owned by Cumulus Media. Its studios are located on South Eleventh Street in Beaumont and its transmitter is located in Vidor, Texas.

== Ratings and Popularity ==
The Beaumont/Port Arthur Radio market is the #133 radio market in size according to the Arbitron rating service. As of Fall 2006, KQXY-FM was the 2nd highest rated station with a 9.3% share of the 15+ market, behind sister Urban station KTCX's 17.0% market share in the Beaumont/Port Arthur DMA.

== History ==
KQXY signed on the air as a licensed Class C FM broadcast facility, with the call sign KLVI-FM on January 3, 1967, with an ERP of 59 kilowatts, from a HAAT of 230 meters, and as the FM sister to KLVI. The facility was originally proposed by and licensed to John H. Hicks, Jr. & Madelyn O. Hicks.

The callsign of KLVI-FM would quickly be changed in September 1967 to KBPO to reflect the three major communities served of Beaumont, Port Arthur, and Orange.

On September 15, 1976, the station would become the current KQXY as "The Beautiful Q", the Golden Triangle's easy listening radio station. Towards the late 1980s, it moved toward mainstream adult contemporary as "Y94". During the majority of the 1990s, the station identified simply as "94.1 KQXY" playing an "80s, 90s, and now" format before segueing to CHR direction in the early 2000s.
