= KLVI =

- Beaumont, Texas; United States
- Broadcast area: Golden Triangle
- Frequency: 560 kHz
- Branding: KLVI NewsTalk 560

Programming
- Format: Talk radio
- Affiliations: Premiere Networks; Westwood One; Fox News Radio; Fox Sports Radio

Ownership
- Owner: iHeartMedia, Inc.; (iHM Licenses, LLC)
- Sister stations: KCOL-FM; KIOC; KKMY; KYKR

History
- First air date: October 1, 1924
- Former call signs: KFDM (1924–1963)
- Call sign meaning: "LVI" is 56 in Roman numerals

Technical information
- Licensing authority: FCC
- Facility ID: 25580
- Class: B
- Power: 5,000 watts
- Transmitter coordinates: 30°2′43.8″N 93°52′15.6″W

Links
- Public license information: Public file; LMS
- Webcast: Listen live (via iHeartRadio)
- Website: klvi.iheart.com

KLVI (560 AM, "News Talk 560") is an commercial radio station licensed to Beaumont, Texas, United States, and serves the Beaumont–Port Arthur metropolitan area. Owned by iHeartMedia, it features a conservative talk format with studios on Dowlen Road in Beaumont and transmitter is off Tower Road in Bridge City.

== History ==
The station first signed on as KFDM, on October 1, 1924. It was the first radio station in Southeast Texas. In the 1930s, it was owned by the Sabine Broadcasting Company with studios in the million-dollar Hotel Beaumont. It transmitted with 1,000 watts by day and 500 watts at night.

In the 1940s, KFDM was given permission to boost nighttime power to 1,000 watts, same as the daytime. KLVI became an affiliate of the NBC Blue Network, carrying its dramas, comedies, news, sports, soap operas, game shows and big band broadcasts during the "Golden Age of Radio". The Blue Network later became ABC Radio. As network programming moved from radio to television in the 1950s and 1960s, KLVI switched to a full service, middle of the road format of popular adult music, news, talk and sports.

The station was assigned the call sign KLVI by the Federal Communications Commission on December 31, 1963; the call change took place after the radio station came under separate ownership from KFDM-TV. On-air personality Al Caldwell is credited with booking the first public performance ever played by ZZ Top, at a Knights of Columbus hall in Beaumont on February 10, 1970, though he was working at crosstown KAYC at the time.

KLVI was a top 40 music station through the mid-1970s but flipped to a country format in 1977. Later, it added AM stereo using the Motorola C-QUAM method. In the 1980s, KLVI added more talk programs and reduced the music, as music listening increasingly became the domain of FM radio. By the 1990s, the station made the full transition to talk radio. Clear Channel Communications, based in San Antonio, acquired KLVI in 2000. Clear Channel later switched its name to iHeartMedia, Inc.

== Programming ==
Al Caldwell hosts the station's local morning show; the remainder of the schedule is nationally syndicated conservative talk shows.
