= KAYD-FM =

- Silsbee, Texas; United States
- Broadcast area: Beaumont-Port Arthur
- Frequency: 101.7 MHz
- Branding: KD 101.7

Programming
- Language: English
- Format: Country
- Affiliations: Westwood One

Ownership
- Owner: Cumulus Media; (CUMULUS LICENSING LLC)
- Sister stations: KQXY, KTCX-FM

History
- First air date: December 10, 1979; 46 years ago (as KWDX)
- Former call signs: KWDX (1979–2000); KLOI (2000–2002)
- Call sign meaning: KAYD (station branding; spoken as "Kay-Dee")

Technical information
- Licensing authority: FCC
- Facility ID: 31109
- Class: C3
- ERP: 10,500 watts
- HAAT: 153.2 meters (503 ft)
- Transmitter coordinates: 30°6′54″N 93°59′56″W

Links
- Public license information: Public file; LMS
- Webcast: Listen live
- Website: kayd.com

KAYD-FM (101.7 MHz; "KD 101.7") is a radio station broadcasting a country music format. Licensed to Silsbee, Texas, United States, the station serves the Beaumont-Port Arthur area. The station is currently owned by Cumulus Media. Its studios are located on South Eleventh Street in Beaumont and its transmitter is located in Vidor, Texas.

== History ==
KAYD was one of the oldest FMs in Texas. It began broadcasting March 1, 1948, on 99.5 MHz as KRIC and continued on that frequency in the 1950s until interference to viewers trying to watch KGUL (now KHOU) TV in Galveston caused the FCC to swap frequencies with Lake Charles, Louisiana, and put KRIC on 97.5 FM. Later the callsign was changed to KAYD to match its AM counterpoint, 1450 KAYC when it was acquired by Texas Coast Broadcasters, David H. Morris, President. Later, the callsign was changed to KFNC and a new 2,000-foot tower was built for the 97.5 frequency near Winnie, Texas so it could try to move to the Houston market in 2001. The callsign KAYD was moved to 101.7, licensed to Silsbee, Texas. 101.7 was assigned the call letters KWDX on December 10, 1979. On February 11, 2000, the station changed its call sign to KLOI; & on April 10, 2002 to the current KAYD.
