= KTCX =

- Beaumont, Texas; United States
- Broadcast area: Beaumont, Texas
- Frequency: 102.5 MHz
- Branding: Magic 102.5

Programming
- Language: English
- Format: Urban contemporary
- Affiliations: Compass Media Networks; Premiere Networks

Ownership
- Owner: Cumulus Media; (Cumulus Licensing LLC)
- Sister stations: KAYD, KQXY

History
- First air date: December 3, 1998
- Former call signs: KAPW (1996, CP)
- Call sign meaning: portmanteau meaning: Touch and Texas

Technical information
- Licensing authority: FCC
- Facility ID: 4462
- Class: C2
- ERP: 50,000 watts
- HAAT: 150 m (492 ft)
- Transmitter coordinates: 29.989°N 94.245°W

Links
- Public license information: Public file; LMS
- Webcast: Listen live
- Website: ktcx.com

KTCX (102.5 FM) is an urban contemporary formatted radio station in Beaumont, Texas. It serves the entire Golden Triangle and is owned by Cumulus Media. The station's studios are located on South Eleventh Street in Beaumont, and its transmitter is located between Beaumont and Fannett.

KTCX "Magic 102.5" was launched on December 3, 1998 based on its current format. Because it is the market's only Urban-formatted station of any kind, it plays a variety of Hip Hop, R&B, Soul, Old School, and Gospel music to cater to all African American demographics including the Mainstream audience to the Adult audience, thus making it one of the highest rated stations (sometimes #1) in the Triangle. It is the home of the nationally syndicated Steve Harvey Morning Show. However, KTCX was originally an Urban AC station playing R&B and Old School only through "The Touch," a subsidiary of the ABC Radio Network. In 2001, KTCX tweaked its format and added Hip Hop artists to the playlist as most Hip Hop listeners had to rely on out of town Houston station KBXX for the genre beforehand.

The station and its branding is not to be confused with Houston R&B station KMJQ "Majic 102.1", which rebranded from "Majic 102" to avoid it.
