= 100.5 FM =

FM radio frequency

100.5 FM may refer to one of many FM radio stations:

== Argentina ==
- FM Córdoba in Córdoba
- del Sol in Pehuajó, Buenos Aires
- Metropolitana in San Miguel de Tucumán, Tucumán
- Ilusiones in Rincón de los Sauces, Neuquén
- Sudamericana in Corrientes
- Xradio in San Clemente del Tuyú, Buenos Aires
- Vida in Buenos Aires
- Urbana in Posadas, Misiones
- San Martín in Lobería, Buenos Aires
- LRJ 717 La voz in San Juan
- El camino in Jujuy
- Traslasierra in Mina Clavero, Córdoba
- Marina in Miramar, Buenos Aires
- FM100 in Sierra Grande, Río Negro
- del este in Chajarí, Entre Ríos
- Los 40 Principales Paraná in Paraná, Entre Ríos
- UTN San Nicolás in San Nicolás de Los Arroyos, Buenos Aires
- Adelia María in Adelia María, Córdoba
- Estudio Net in Casilda, Santa Fe
- Golden 80 in Luján, Buenos Aires
- Disco in San José, Entre Ríos
- Visión in Lamarque, Río Negro
- Chana in Victoria, Entre Ríos
- Minuto 24 in La Rioja
- Color in Buenos Aires

== Australia ==
- 2KY in Broken Hill, New South Wales
- 2RPH in Sydney, New South Wales
- 5WOW in Adelaide, South Australia
- ABC Northern Tasmania in Devonport, Tasmania
- ABC Riverina in Griffith, New South Wales
- CAAMA in Alice Springs, Northern Territory
- Midwest Aboriginal Media Association in Geraldton, Western Australia
- SBS Radio in Dubbo, New South Wales

== Belize ==
- My Refuge Christian Radio at Belize City, Belize District

== China ==
- Radio Huadu in Guangzhou

== Canada (Channel 263) ==
- CBBL-FM in London, Ontario
- CBSI-FM-15 in Harrington Harbour, Quebec
- CBSI-FM-6 in Fermont, Quebec
- CBVF-FM in Port-Daniel, Quebec
- CBXM-FM in Manning, Alberta
- CFJL-FM in Winnipeg, Manitoba
- CFIN-FM in Lac-Etchemin, Quebec
- CFRP-FM in Forestville, Quebec
- CFSR-FM in Hope, British Columbia
- CHAS-FM in Sault Ste. Marie, Ontario
- CHBT-FM in North Battleford, Saskatchewan
- CHFA-8-FM in Medicine Hat, Alberta
- CHFT-FM in Fort McMurray, Alberta
- CHLS-FM in Lillooet, British Columbia
- CHUR-FM in North Bay, Ontario
- CIBO-FM in Senneterre, Quebec
- CIOK-FM in Saint John, New Brunswick
- CJJC-FM in Yorkton, Saskatchewan
- CKJJ-FM-3 in Kingston, Ontario
- CFRO-FM in Vancouver, British Columbia
- CKRU-FM in Peterborough, Ontario
- VF2104 in Chetwynd, British Columbia
- VF2351 in Granisle, British Columbia

== Guatemala (Channel 32) ==
- TGN-FM in Guatemala City

== Indonesia ==
- Delta FM in Surabaya, East Java

== Israel ==
- Kan Reka in Jerusalem, the Judea and Samaria Area, Nazareth and Netanya

== Malaysia ==
- Nasional FM in Kedah, Perlis and Penang
- Zayan in Kota Bharu, Kelantan (Coming Soon)

== Mexico ==
- XHBCC-FM in Ciudad del Carmen, Campeche
- XHBZ-FM in Ciudad Delicias, Chihuahua
- XHDCA-FM in Miahuatlán de Porfirio Díaz, Oaxaca
- XHFRE-FM in Fresnillo, Zacatecas
- XHHD-FM in Durango, Durango
- XHIDO-FM in Tula, Hidalgo
- XHIMA-FM in Colima, Colima
- XHJLAM-FM in Jojutla, Morelos
- XHPEAQ-FM in Jiquipilas, Chiapas
- XHPMAX-FM in Temax, Yucatán
- XHRTO-FM in Felipe Carrillo Puerto, Quintana Roo
- XHSCBW-FM in Yuriria, Guanajuato
- XHSCFE-FM in Chalco, State of Mexico
- XHTLX-FM in Santa María Asunción Tlaxiaco, Oaxaca
- XHTNT-FM in Los Mochis, Sinaloa
- XHUF-FM in Uruapan, Michoacán
- XHVE-FM in Veracruz, Veracruz
- XHXR-FM in Ciudad Valles, San Luis Potosí

== Philippines ==
- Radyo Natin FM in Dipolog City Philippines

== United Kingdom ==
- Q Radio Newry and Mourne in Newry, Northern Ireland
- Digital Hits 1 in North Somerset
- Heart West in Totnes

== United States (Channel 263) ==
- KATT in Oklahoma City, Oklahoma
- KBDR in Mirando City, Texas
- KBFX in Anchorage, Alaska
- KBLY in Newcastle, Texas
- KBYI in Rexburg, Idaho
- KCGF-LP in San Angelo, Texas
- KDDM in Annona, Texas
- KDHK in Decorah, Iowa
- KEFC-LP in Turlock, California
- KEGI in Jonesboro, Arkansas
- KELB-LP in Lake Charles, Louisiana
- KETL-LP in Republic, Washington
- KGHT in El Jebel, Colorado
- KIKN in Salem, South Dakota
- KJJM in Baker, Montana
- KJLR-LP in Reno, Nevada
- KLNA-LP in Pittsburg, Texas
- KMEM-FM in Memphis, Missouri
- KMEN in Mendota, California
- KMME in Cottage Grove, Oregon
- KMQA in East Porterville, California
- KMVL-FM in Madisonville, Texas
- KMXD in Monroe, Utah
- KNNK in Dimmitt, Texas
- KNPI-LP in Padre Island, Texas
- KONA-LP in Kailua-Kona, Hawaii
- KPPZ-LP in Kansas City, Missouri
- KPSI in Palm Springs, California
- KPUP-LP in Patagonia, Arizona
- KQBB in Center, Texas
- KQLG-LP in Billings, Montana
- KQZB in Troy, Idaho
- KRIK (FM) in Refugio, Texas
- KRSJ in Durango, Colorado
- KSCK-LP in Sterling City, Texas
- KSGC-LP in Garden City, Kansas
- KSWF in Aurora, Missouri
- KTDE in Gualala, California
- KTED in Evansville, Wyoming
- KTFR in Chelsea, Oklahoma
- KTGR-FM in Fulton, Missouri
- KUOZ-LP in Clarksville, Arkansas
- KUPV-LP in Santa Rosa, California
- KVWF in Augusta, Kansas
- KWIQ-FM in Moses Lake, Washington
- KXAC in Saint James, Minnesota
- KXDZ in Templeton, California
- KXQQ-FM in Henderson, Nevada
- KZDB in Roswell, New Mexico
- KZHE in Stamps, Arkansas
- KZRJ-LP in Jerome, Arizona
- KZZO in Sacramento, California
- WALC in Charleston, South Carolina
- WAON-LP in Picayune, Mississippi
- WAVL in Rothschild, Wisconsin
- WBLE in Batesville, Mississippi
- WBOU-LP in Nashville, Tennessee
- WCDW in Susquehanna, Pennsylvania
- WDPI-LP in Palatka, Florida
- WDVI in Rochester, New York
- WDYK in Ridgeley, West Virginia
- WEBI-LP in Woodlawn, Virginia
- WEEH-LP in Hart, Michigan
- WFCX in Apalachicola, Florida
- WFOI-LP in Fayette, Mississippi
- WGRG-LP in Geneseo, Illinois
- WHHZ in Newberry, Florida
- WHIC-LP in Carthage, Tennessee
- WIAR-LP in Hilton Head Island, South Carolina
- WIML-LP in Lebanon, Tennessee
- WJFN-FM in Goochland, Virginia
- WJLL-LP in Memphis, Tennessee
- WJNG in Johnsonburg, Pennsylvania
- WJQX in Helena, Alabama
- WJRL-FM in Slocomb, Alabama
- WKEE in Huntington, West Virginia
- WKXA in Findlay, Ohio
- WLGW in Glade Spring, Virginia
- WNNX in College Park, Georgia
- WOMP in Bellaire, Ohio
- WQBG in Elizabethville, Pennsylvania
- WQSW-LP in Fort Wayne, Indiana
- WRBY-LP in Salisbury, Maryland
- WRCH in New Britain, Connecticut
- WRTM-FM in Sharon, Mississippi
- WRVY-FM in Henry, Illinois
- WSCN in Cloquet, Minnesota
- WSDF in Louisville, Kentucky
- WSGW in Carrollton, Michigan
- WSJD in Princeton, Indiana
- WSSL in Gray Court, South Carolina
- WTLX in Columbus, Wisconsin
- WTRV in Walker, Michigan
- WVBW-FM in Norfolk, Virginia
- WVEM-LP in Stanley, North Carolina
- WWFN-FM in Marion, South Carolina
- WWKI in Kokomo, Indiana
- WXRS in Swainsboro, Georgia
- WXXK in Lebanon, New Hampshire
- WYMG in Jacksonville, Illinois
