= 1030 AM =

AM radio frequency

The following radio stations broadcast on AM frequency 1030 kHz: 1030 AM is a United States clear-channel frequency. WBZ Boston is the dominant Class A station on 1030 AM.

== In Argentina ==
- LS10 Del Plata in Argentina

== In Guatemala (Channel 50) ==
- TGUX in Guatemala City

== In Mexico ==
- XEBCC-AM in Ciudad del Carmen, Campeche
- XEIE-AM in Matehuala, San Luis Potosí
- XENKA-AM in Felipe Carrillo Puerto, Quintana Roo
- XEQR-AM in Mexico City
- XEROPJ-AM in Lagos de Moreno, Jalisco.
- XESDD-AM in Puerto Nuevo, Baja California
- XEVFS-AM in Las Margaritas, Chiapas

== In the United States ==
Stations in bold are clear-channel stations.

Call sign	City of license	Facility ID	Class	Daytime power (kW)	Nighttime power (kW)	Critical hours power (kW)	Unlimited power (kW)	Transmitter coordinates
KBUF	Holcomb, Kansas	33689	B	2.5	1.2			38.000278°N 100.898333°W
KCTA	Corpus Christi, Texas	7093	D	50				27.933056°N 97.259722°W
KCWJ	Blue Springs, Missouri	48959	B	5	0.5			39.045556°N 94.235°W
KDUN	Reedsport, Oregon	33779	B	50	0.63			43.738056°N 124.075°W
KFAY	Farmington, Arkansas	16573	B	6	1			36.109444°N 94.183611°W
KJDJ	San Luis Obispo, California	29795	B	2.5	0.7			35.299444°N 120.673333°W
KMAS	Shelton, Washington	60878	B	10	1			47.221389°N 123.079444°W
KTWO	Casper, Wyoming	11924	B	50	50			42.842778°N 106.218611°W
KVOI	Cortaro, Arizona	13969	B	10	1			32.3475°N 111.071944°W
**WBZ**	Boston, Massachusetts	25444	A				50	42.278889°N 70.876111°W
WCTS	Maplewood, Minnesota	12114	B	50	1			44.866944°N 92.900556°W
WDRU	Wake Forest, North Carolina	53104	D	50				36.178611°N 78.758333°W
WEBS	Calhoun, Georgia	54881	D	5	0.003			34.490278°N 84.917778°W
WGFC	Floyd, Virginia	23044	D	1				36.925833°N 80.276111°W
WGSF	Memphis, Tennessee	65207	D	50		10		35.183056°N 89.938056°W
WKEG	Sterling Heights, Michigan	20629	D	5				42.604722°N 82.911111°W
WNOW	Mint Hill, North Carolina	10646	D	9.4				35.140556°N 80.600278°W
WNVR	Vernon Hills, Illinois	52910	D	10	0.12	3.2		42.252778°N 88.395833°W
WONQ	Oviedo, Florida	21760	B	45	1.7			28.675°N 81.166667°W
WTHQ	Point Pleasant, West Virginia	5284	D	10		2.9		38.811667°N 82.099722°W
WYCZ	White Bluff, Tennessee	4912	B	1	0.25			36.134167°N 87.216111°W
