= KMRV =

Radio station in Waukon, Iowa

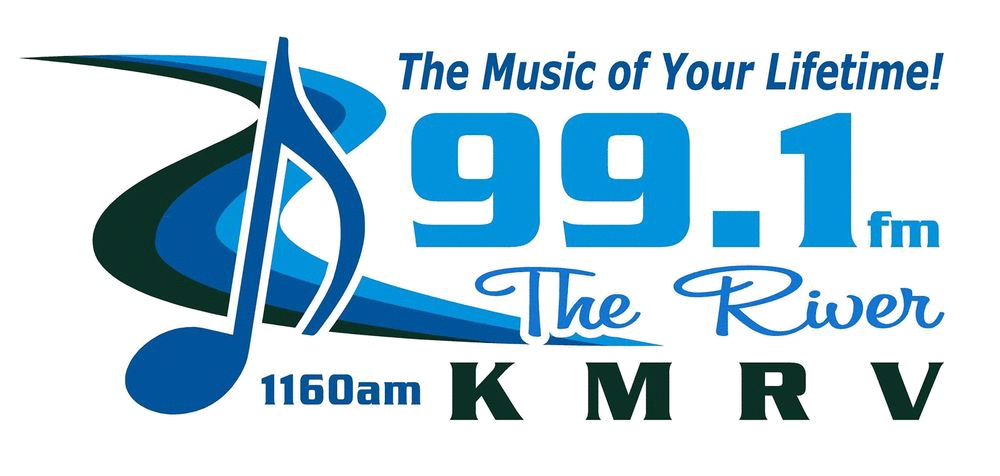
- Waukon, Iowa; United States
- Broadcast area: Waukon, Iowa
- Frequency: 1160 kHz
- Branding: 94.9 & 99.1 The River

Programming
- Language: English
- Format: Adult contemporary
- Affiliations: Radio Iowa

Ownership
- Owner: Wennes Communications; (Wennes Communications Stations, Inc.)
- Sister stations: KNEI-FM, KVIK, KDEC, KDHK

History
- First air date: July 1, 1967; 59 years ago
- Last air date: June 3, 2021
- Former call signs: KNEI (1967–2005); KHPP (2005–2011); KSFF (2011); KFXE (2011–2016)
- Former frequencies: 1140 kHz (1972–2005); 1160 kHz (2005–2021)
- Call sign meaning: K Mississippi RiVer

Technical information
- Licensing authority: FCC
- Facility ID: 15733
- Class: D
- Power: 880 watts (day); 26 watts (night); 250 watts (STA)

Links
- Public license information: Public file; LMS

KMRV (1160 AM, "99.1 The River") was a commercial radio station that served the Waukon, Iowa, area. KMRV was originally a daytime-only station broadcasting on 1140 kHz, with the call letters KNEI. The station was last owned by Wennes Communications. KMRV's format continues to be heard on KDEC (1240 AM) in Decorah and 100.5 FM (HD2) KDHK, which replaced KMRV as the source of translator K256CS (99.1 FM) at closure.

Wennes Communications surrendered KMRV's license to the Federal Communications Commission on June 3, 2021 for cancellation; the FCC cancelled the station's license on June 4, 2021.

== History ==
KNEI went on the air on July 1, 1967, originally on 1140 kHz. It initially broadcast with 250 watts during daytime hours only, increased to 1,000 watts in 1970. Original owner Ralph M. Sweeney sold the station to David H. Hogendorn, the original manager, in 1972. Though primarily a country music station, KNEI was block-formatted in the early years, with slots for polka and rock and roll music.

In 1997, Hogendorn sold KNEI and its associated FM, KNEI-FM, to Marathon Media for $600,000. He exited radio to focus on his travel business; soon after, his weekly big band program also left the air. Greg Wennes bought the Waukon stations and KVIK in Decorah, in 2002; he had previously been manager of the company's cluster in La Crosse, Wisconsin.

In 2019, the lease for KMRV's transmitter site was not renewed, and the station moved to broadcasting at reduced power with 250 watts, which it did until Wennes surrendered the license. The Federal Communications Commission deleted KMRV's license on June 4, 2021.
