= KDEC =

KDEC may refer to:

- KDEC (AM), a radio station (1240 AM) licensed to serve Decorah, Iowa, United States
- KDHK, a radio station (100.5 FM) licensed to serve Decorah, Iowa, which held the call sign KDEC-FM from 1994 to 2019
- The ICAO code for Decatur Airport
