= KQSI =

KQSI may refer to:

- KQSI-LP, a low-power radio station (89.5 FM) licensed to serve Sidney, Nebraska, United States
- KXXE, a radio station (92.5 FM) licensed to serve San Augustine, Texas, United States, which held the call sign KQSI from 2001 to 2010
