= KFXE =

KFXE may refer to:

- Fort Lauderdale Executive Airport (ICAO code KFXE)
- KFXE (FM), a radio station (96.5 FM) licensed to serve Ingram, Texas, United States
- KMRV, a defunct radio station (1160 AM) formerly licensed to serve Waukon, Iowa, United States, which held the call sign KFXE from 2011 to 2016
