= KHPP =

KHPP may refer to:

- KHPP-LP, a low-power radio station (106.9 FM) licensed to serve Sterlington, Louisiana, United States
- KMRV, a defunct radio station (1160 AM) formerly licensed to serve Waukon, Iowa, United States, which held the call sign KHPP from 2007 to 2011
- Kakhovka Hydroelectric Power Plant, a power plant that was destroyed during the 2022 Russian invasion of Ukraine.
