= Wow FM =

Wow FM could refer to:

== Australia ==
- Wow FM (Penrith) (call sign 2WOW), a radio station in Penrith, New South Wales, Australia
- WOW FM 100.5 (call sign 5WOW), a radio station branded as "WOW FM" in Semaphore, South Australia

== Philippines ==
- DXRV-FM, a radio station (103.5 FM) in Davao City, Philippines, branded as Wow FM from 2002 to 2014
- DWKY, a radio station branded as "91.5 Energy FM" licensed to Pasig, Philippines

== United States ==
- KWQW, a radio station branded as "WOW-FM" (98.3 FM) licensed to Boone, Iowa, United States
- WOWF, a radio station branded as "WOW Country 102.5 FM" (102.5 FM) licensed to Crossville, Tennessee, United States
- WYCD, a radio station branded as "99-5 WOW-FM" from 1992 to 1993 licensed to Detroit, Michigan, United States

== Other countries ==
- wow.fm, a predecessor of Malaysian radio station Hot FM (Malaysia)
