= KSCK =

KSCK may refer to:

- KSCK-LP, a low-power radio station (100.5 FM) licensed to serve Sterling City, Texas, United States
- Stockton Metropolitan Airport (ICAO code KSCK)
