= WDDK =

- Greensboro, Georgia; United States
- Broadcast area: Milledgeville, Georgia
- Frequency: 103.9 MHz
- Branding: Dock 103.9

Programming
- Format: Conservative talk/Oldies
- Affiliations: ABC Radio

Ownership
- Owner: Wyche Services Corporation

History
- Former call signs: WGRG (1980–1990)

Technical information
- Licensing authority: FCC
- Facility ID: 6798
- Class: A
- ERP: 5,300 watts
- HAAT: 100 meters
- Transmitter coordinates: 33°28′29.00″N 83°14′46.00″W

Links
- Public license information: Public file; LMS
- Website: 1039wddk.com

WDDK (103.9 FM) is a radio station broadcasting a Conservative Talk/Oldies format. Licensed to Greensboro, Georgia, United States, the station is currently owned by Wyche Services Corporation and features programming from ABC Radio .

== History ==
The station went on the air as WGRG on 1980-07-21. On 1990-04-13, the station changed its call sign to the current WDDK.
