= KCUF =

KCUF may refer to:

- KGHT, a radio station (100.5 FM) licensed to El Jebel, Colorado, United States, which held the call sign KCUF from August 2005 to June 2010
- The call sign of a fictional radio station (located in the equally fictional Kinneret, California) in Thomas Pynchon's The Crying of Lot 49
- The reversed spelling for fuck
