= Krik =

Krik may refer to:

- Křik, the native name of The Cry (1964 film), a Czechoslovak drama film
- Benya Krik, fictional thug from the tales of Russian Jewish writer Isaac Babel
- KRIK (FM), F.M. radio station licensed to Refugio, Texas
