= KEFC =

KEFC may refer to:

- KEFC-LP, a low-power radio station (100.5 FM) licensed to Turlock, California, United States
- the ICAO code for Belle Fourche Municipal Airport, in Belle Fourche, South Dakota
