= Nordic Fest =

Coordinates: 43°18′6″N 91°47′25″W

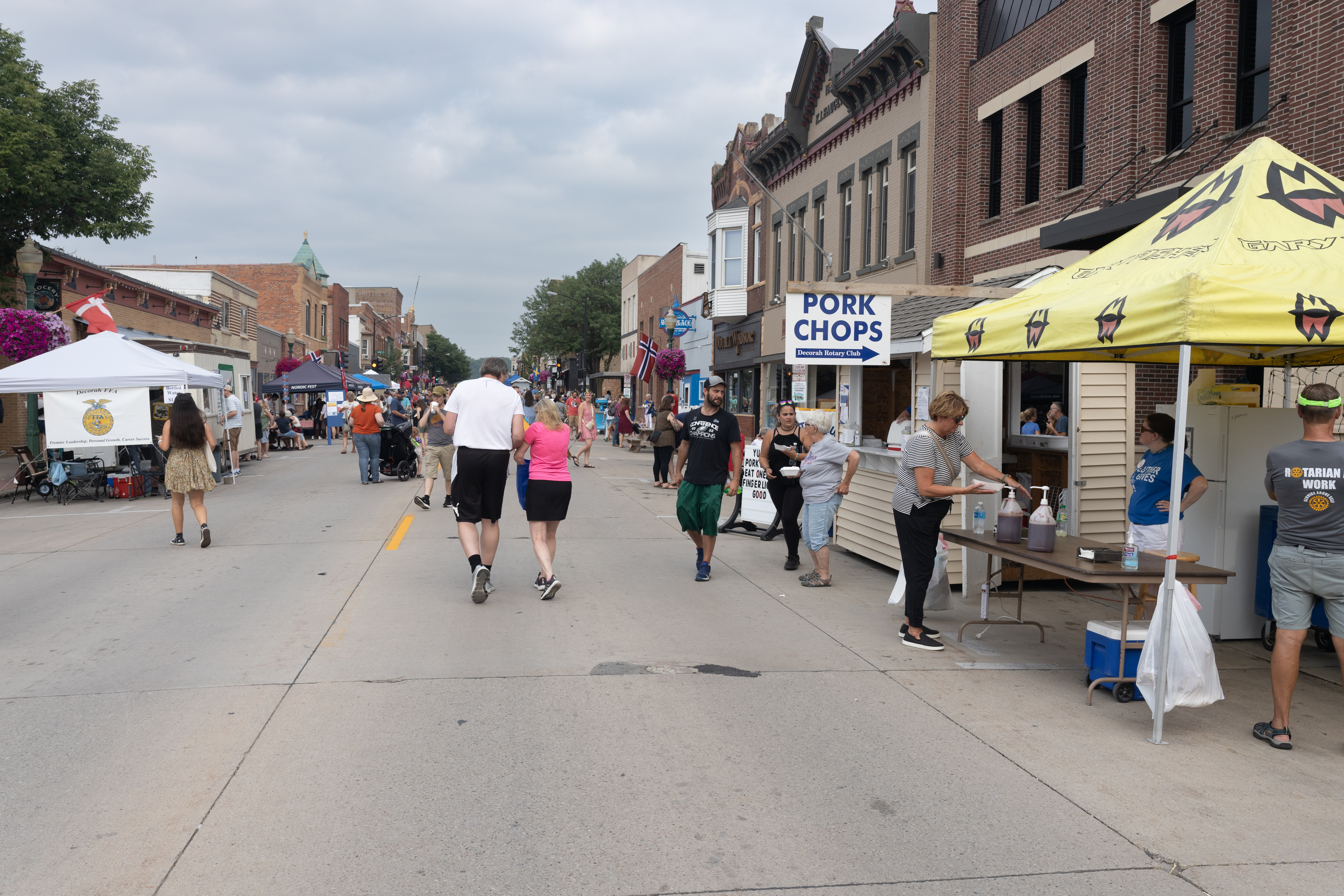
Pork Chop Stand at Nordic Fest, July 2024

Nordic Fest is a weekend festival held annually in Decorah, Iowa, United States, to commemorate the traditional customs and culture of Scandinavian countries, especially Norway. The event always occurs over the last weekend in July and often draws estimated crowds of 50,000 to 75,000.

Started in 1967, Nordic Fest grew from Luther College Women's Club annual celebration of Norwegian Constitution Day known as Syttende Mai. American Norwegians are exceptionally loyal to their heritage, which explains the size and scope of Nordic Fest. Every year, the residents of Decorah, Iowa, put on a jubilee of Old World heritage that brings people to the picturesque hills of northeast Iowa and serves as a kind of homecoming for Scandinavian Americans from many states.

From the start, the entire community has been engaged in Nordic Fest through such efforts as the Decorah Nordic Dancers. Chosen dancers start in third grade and perform at Nordic Fest and other events through their high school graduation, representing 10 years’ commitment. Nordic Fest features traditional foods, antique show, arts and crafts, musical entertainment and Norse storytelling. Demonstrations include knife making, rosemaling, weaving and wood carving, together with other Norwegian folk art. There is a river run and grand parade with marchers in bunads, a traditional Norwegian folk costume. The festival concludes with a street dance and beverage garden with a band. Bands have included the Backhome Boys, the El Caminos, Gaelstorm and Three Beers til Dubuque. There is also a spectacular fireworks display that takes place over the river.

Much on the Nordic Fest activities centers on Luther College and the Vesterheim Norwegian-American Museum. Norwegian immigrants to Decorah decided early on they wanted to preserve the old ways; in 1861, they established Luther College, and in 1877, they started a museum, Vesterheim, today a village of pioneer buildings that keeps traditions alive with year-round workshops and celebrations. The dorms of Luther College accommodate many of the visitors to Nordic Fest. Vesterheim provides viewing of Scandinavian art in the Hauge Gallery of the Westby-Torgerson Education Center.

There was no festival in 2020 as officials cited the COVID-19 pandemic as grounds for cancellation.
