= KOMX =

- Pampa, Texas; United States
- Broadcast area: Amarillo, Texas
- Frequency: 100.3 MHz
- Branding: FM 100

Programming
- Format: Country
- Affiliations: Jones Radio Network

Ownership
- Owner: Grant Merrill and Ben Buckland; (Southwest Media Group – Pampa, LLC)
- Sister stations: KGRO, KRWP

History
- First air date: October 20, 1981; 44 years ago
- Former call signs: KEUA (?-1981)

Technical information
- Licensing authority: FCC
- Facility ID: 51419
- Class: C2
- ERP: 32,000 watts
- HAAT: 88 meters
- Transmitter coordinates: 35°34′39″N 100°57′8″W

Links
- Public license information: Public file; LMS

KOMX (100.3 FM) is a radio station broadcasting a country music format. Licensed to Pampa, Texas, United States, it serves the northeastern portion of the Amarillo area due to interference of KNNK at 100.5 from the southwestern area. The station is currently owned by Grant Merrill and Ben Buckland, through licensee Southwest Media Group – Pampa, LLC.
