= KDET =

- Center, Texas; United States
- Broadcast area: Center, Nacogdoches
- Frequency: 930 kHz
- Branding: KDET AM 930

Programming
- Format: News Talk Information
- Affiliations: Citadel Media

Ownership
- Owner: Center Broadcasting Company
- Sister stations: KQBB, KXXE

History
- Call sign meaning: Deep East Texas

Technical information
- Licensing authority: FCC
- Facility ID: 9769
- Class: D
- Power: 1,000 watts day 36 watts night
- Transmitter coordinates: 31°50′3″N 94°12′53″W

Links
- Public license information: Public file; LMS
- Website: cbc-radio.com/stations/kdet

KDET (930 AM) is a radio station broadcasting news/talk/information format. Licensed to Center, Texas, United States, the station serves the Center-Nacogdoches area. The station is currently owned by Center Broadcasting Company.

KDET began broadcasting in February 1949 under the ownership of Tom Foster and the management of Robert Jackson "Jack" Bell.

Chief star of KDET from 1966 until 2000 was Jack Everett "Jack Mack" McLendon who, while known to his listeners for his early-morning show including a crowing rooster at sign-on and the school lunch menus in rhyme, was also the most prolific producer of advertising on KDET. Jack Mack's cousin Mattie Imelda McLendon Dellinger talked to listeners with her call-in show "Mattie's Partyline" in the 1990s and early 2000s.
