= CIBO-FM =

Community radio station in Senneterre, Quebec

Coordinates: 48°21′24″N 77°13′37″W

- Senneterre, Quebec; Canada
- Frequency: 100.5 MHz

Programming
- Languages: French, English and Native languages

Ownership
- Owner: Communautaire MF de Senneterre Inc.

History
- First air date: unknown (licensed March 20, 1979)

Technical information
- Class: A1
- ERP: 51 watts
- HAAT: 96 metres (315 ft)

CIBO-FM is a community radio station that operates on 100.5 FM in Senneterre, Quebec, Canada.The station was launched in 1979 and is currently owned by Radio Communautaire MF de Senneterre Inc.

The station is a member of the Association des radiodiffuseurs communautaires du Québec.
