= XEROPJ-AM =

Radio station in Lagos de Moreno, Jalisco

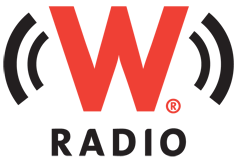
- Lagos de Moreno, Jalisco; Mexico
- Broadcast area: León
- Frequency: 1030 AM
- Branding: W Radio

Programming
- Format: News/talk
- Affiliations: Radiópolis

Ownership
- Owner: GlobalMedia; (Radio Operadora Pegasso, S.A. de C.V.)

History
- First air date: July 2019
- Call sign meaning: Radio Operadora Pegasso Jalisco

Technical information
- Licensing authority: CRT
- Class: B
- Power: 20 kW
- Transmitter coordinates: 21°17′25.1″N 101°51′06.5″W

Links
- Webcast: Listen live
- Website: globalmedia.mx

XEROPJ-AM is a radio station on 1030 AM in Lagos de Moreno, Jalisco, Mexico. It is owned by GlobalMedia and will be known as W Radio with programming from W Radio.

== History ==
XEROPJ was awarded in the IFT-4 radio auction of 2017 and is one of three stations GlobalMedia companies obtained in the auction. The frequency had previously been occupied by XELJ-AM, which migrated to FM as XHLJ-FM 105.7; XEROPJ is broadcast from the former XELJ transmitter.
