= KGRO =

Coordinates: 35°34′39″N 100°57′08″W

- Pampa, Texas; United States
- Frequency: 1230 kHz
- Branding: KGRO AM 1230

Programming
- Format: Adult contemporary

Ownership
- Owner: Grant Merrill and Ben Buckland; (Southwest Media Group – Pampa, LLC)
- Sister stations: KOMX, KRWP

History
- First air date: 1947

Technical information
- Licensing authority: FCC
- Facility ID: 51418
- Class: C
- Power: 1,000 watts
- Translator: (99.9 MHz) K260DU (Stinnett)

Links
- Public license information: Public file; LMS

KGRO (1230 AM) is a radio station licensed to Pampa, Texas. The station broadcasts an adult contemporary format and is owned by Grant Merrill and Ben Buckland, through licensee Southwest Media Group – Pampa, LLC.
