= Decorah, Iowa =

- City
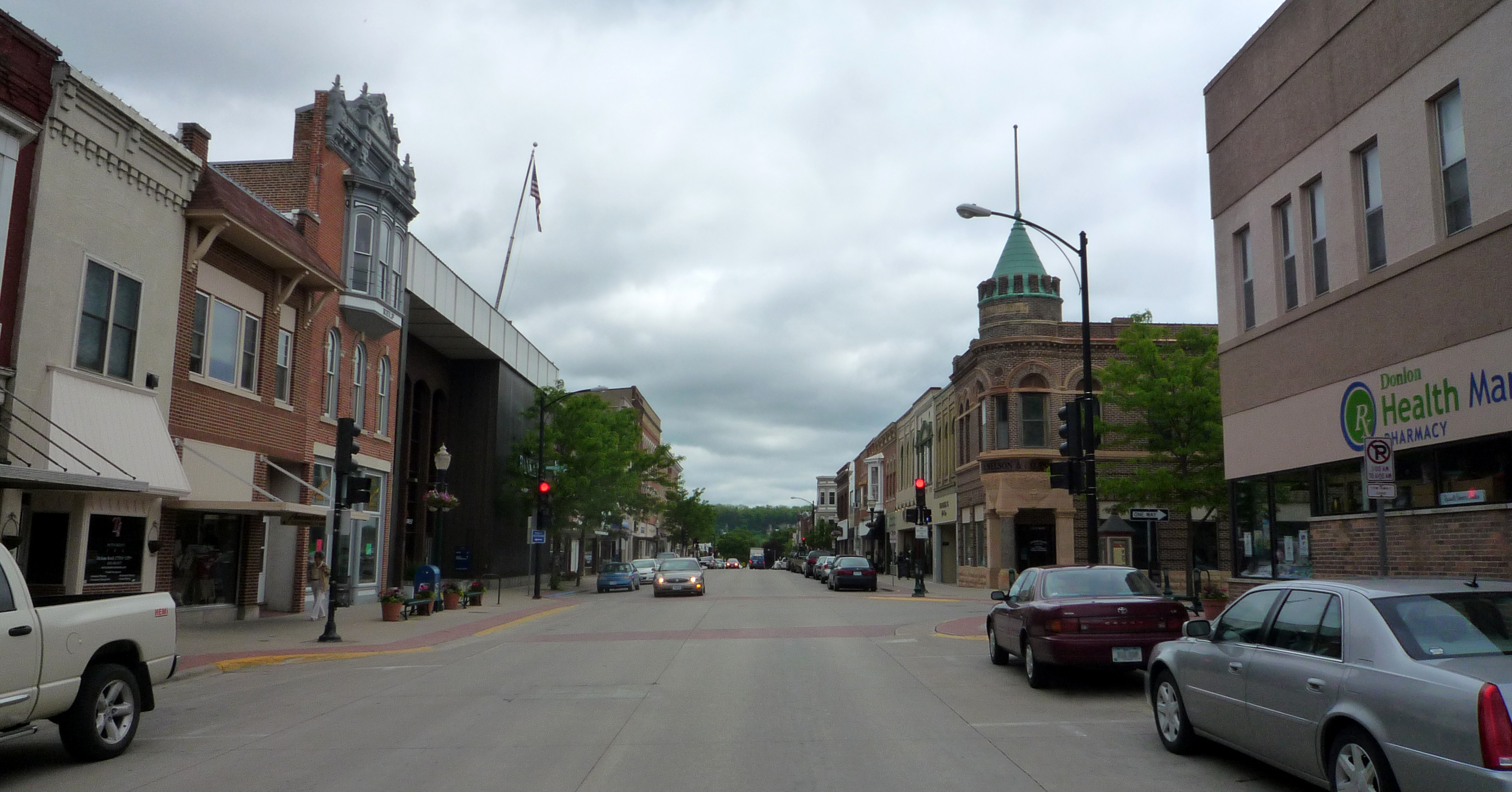
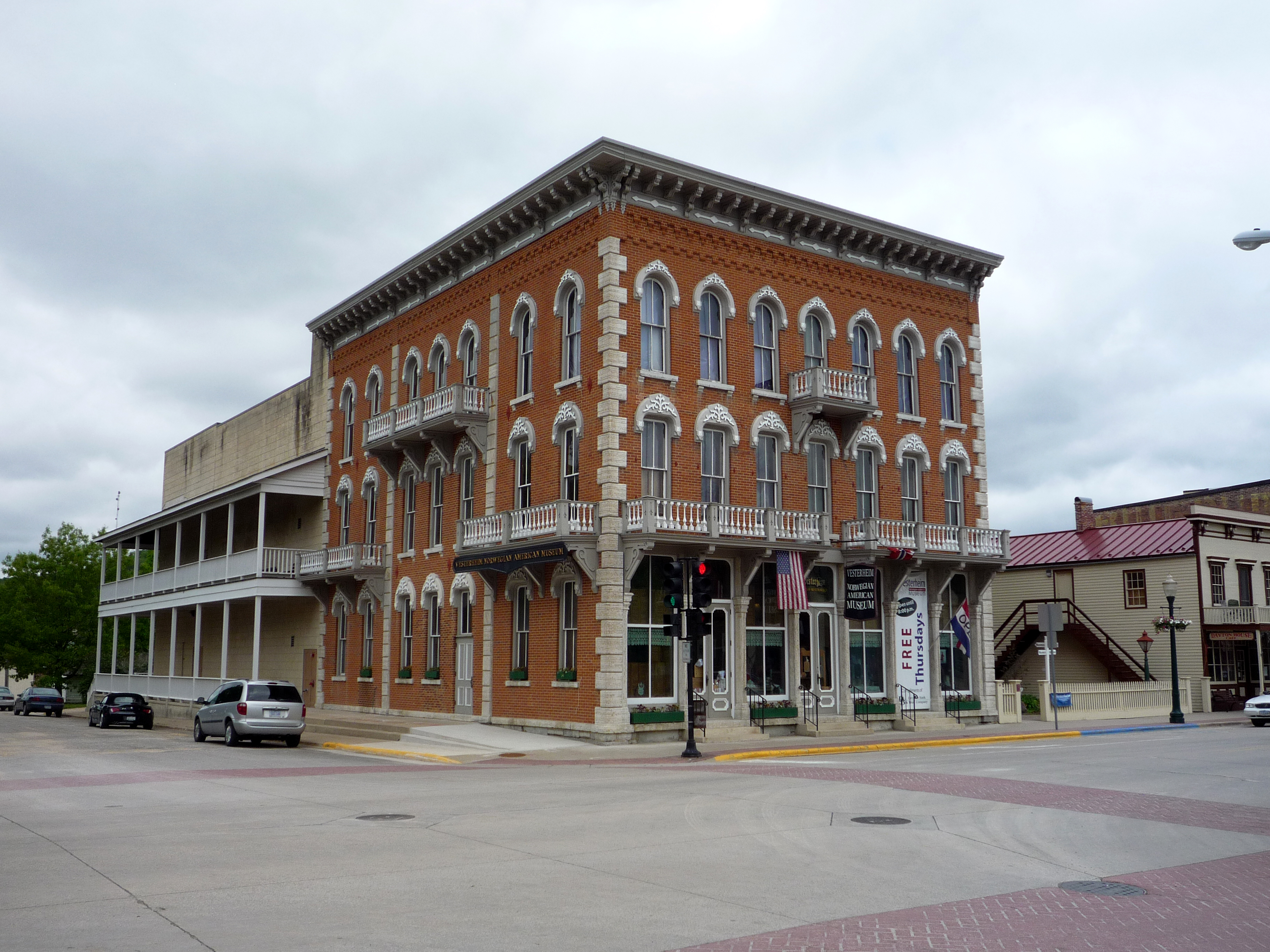
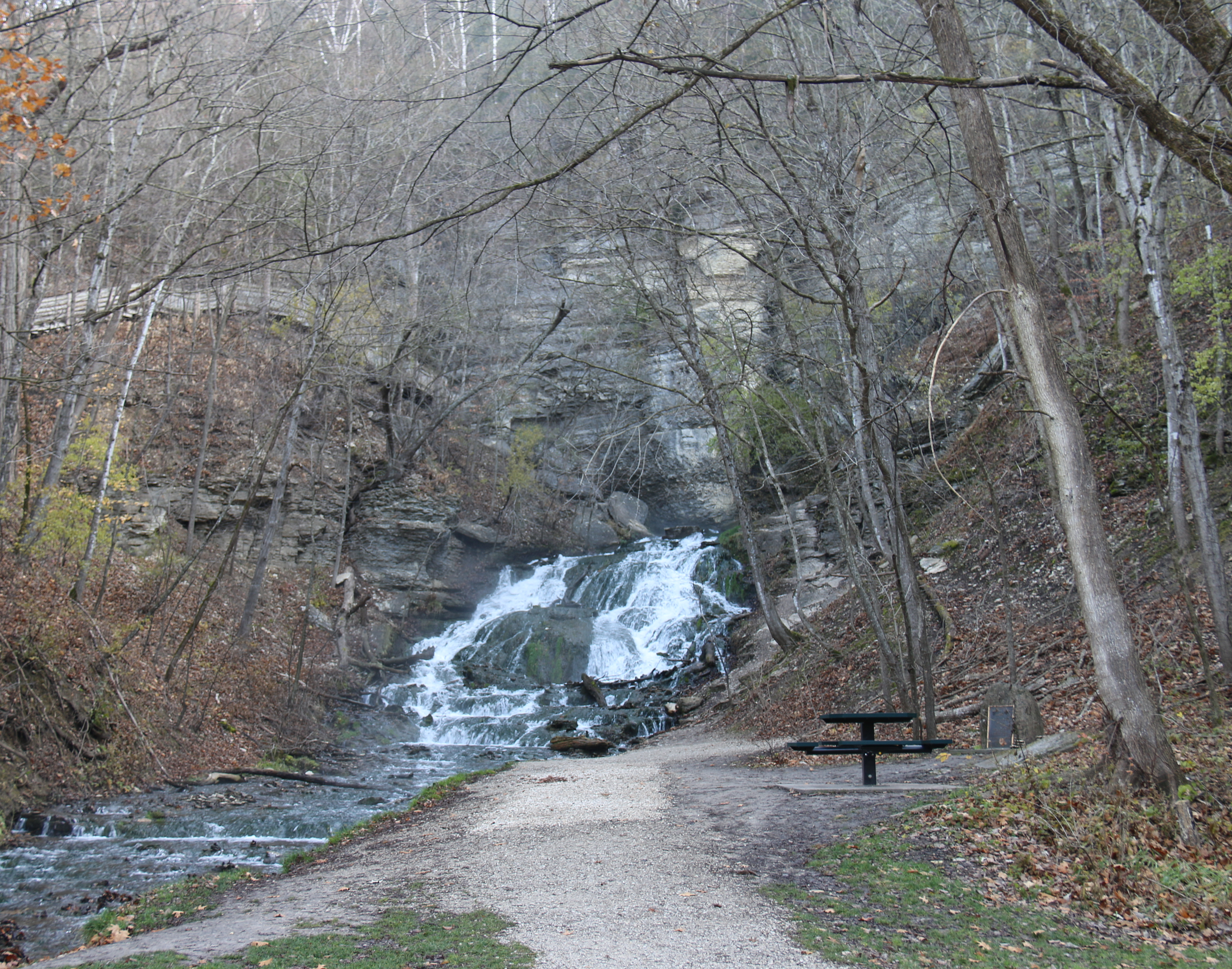
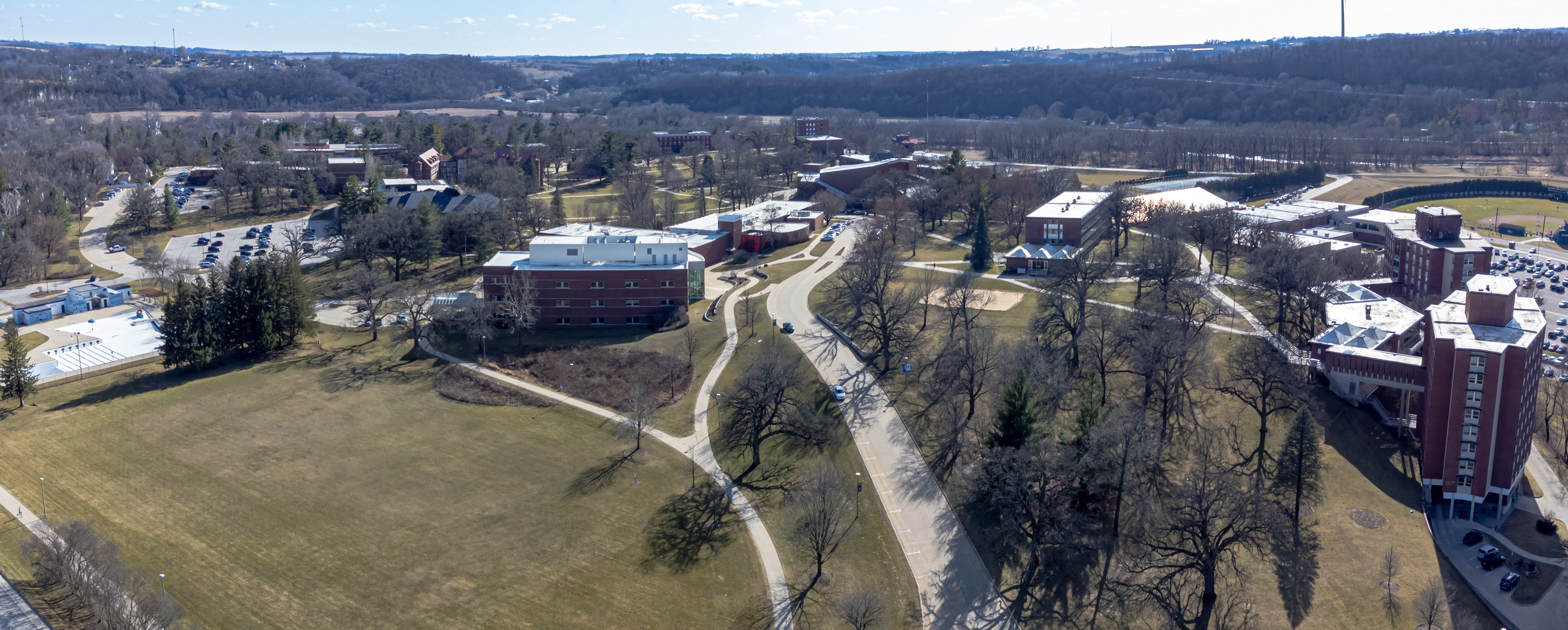
- Downtown Decorah Vesterheim Norwegian-American Museum Dunning's Spring Park Luther College

- Location of Decorah, Iowa
- Coordinates: 43°17′50″N 91°46′02″W
- Country: United States
- State: Iowa
- County: Winneshiek
- Incorporated: June 30, 1857

Government
  - Mayor: Andy Carlson

Area
  - Total: 7.26 sq mi (18.80 km^{2})
  - Land: 7.21 sq mi (18.68 km^{2})
  - Water: 0.042 sq mi (0.11 km^{2})
- Elevation: 869 ft (265 m)

Population (2020)
  - Total: 7,587
  - Density: 1,051.7/sq mi (406.08/km^{2})
- Time zone: UTC-6 (Central (CST))
  - Summer (DST): UTC-5 (CDT)
- ZIP code: 52101
- Area code: 563
- FIPS code: 19-19405
- GNIS feature ID: 2394483
- Website: www.decorahia.org

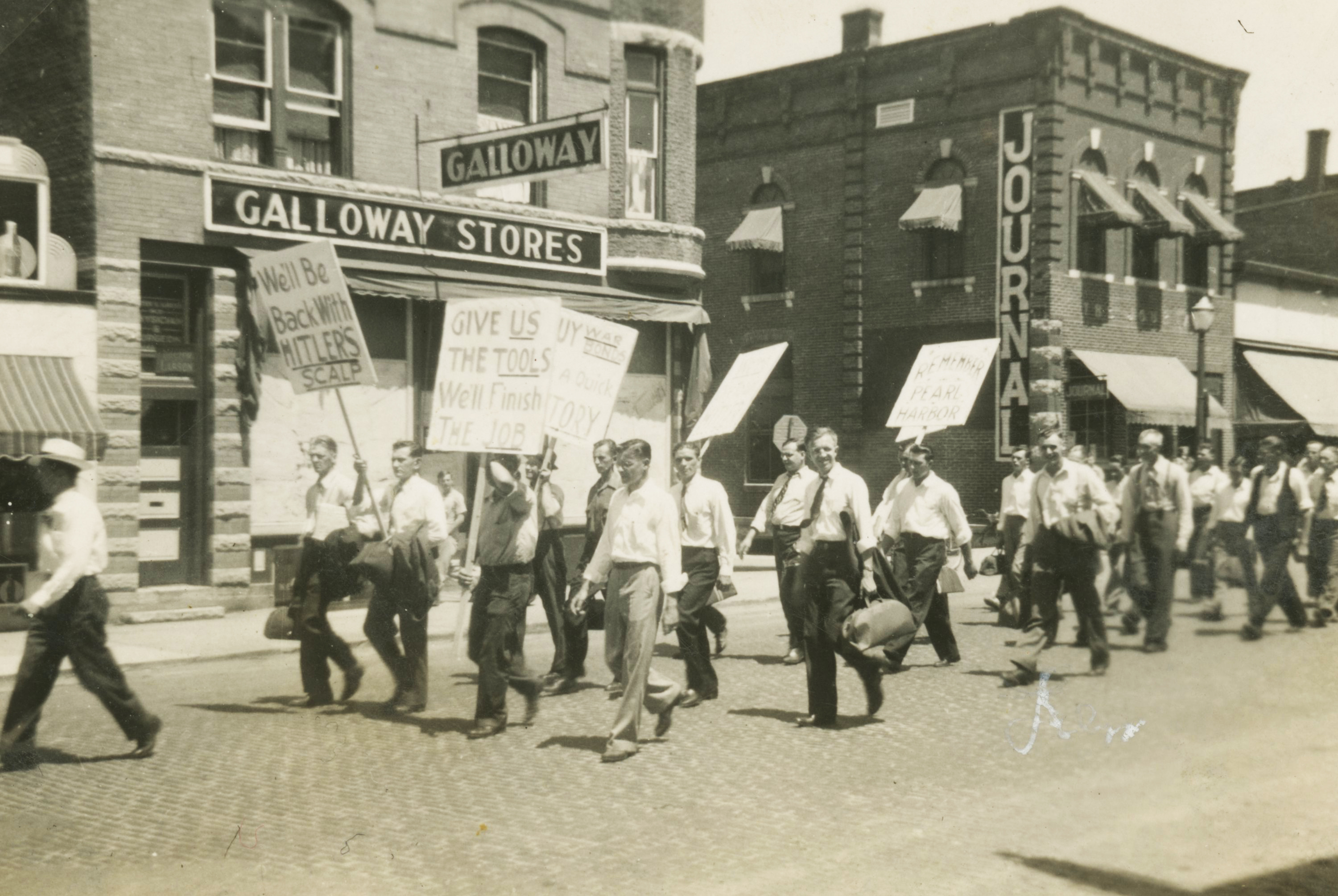
Main Street 1943

Decorah (Note: /dəˈkɔːrə/ or /diˈkɔːrə/) is the largest city in and the county seat of Winneshiek County, Iowa, United States. The population was 7,587 at the time of the 2020 census. Decorah is the home of Luther College, a private liberal arts college. It is known for its Norwegian-American heritage and the corresponding Vesterheim Norwegian-American Museum.

Decorah is located at the intersection of State Highway 9 and U.S. Route 52. Located within the Driftless Area in northeastern Iowa, Decorah is situated in the bluffs of the Upper Iowa River, which flows through the city.

== History ==
Decorah was the site of a Ho-Chunk village beginning circa 1840. Several Ho-Chunks had settled along the Upper Iowa River that year when the U.S. Army forced them to remove from Wisconsin. In 1848, the United States removed the Ho-Chunks again to a new reservation in Minnesota, opening their Iowa villages to white settlers.

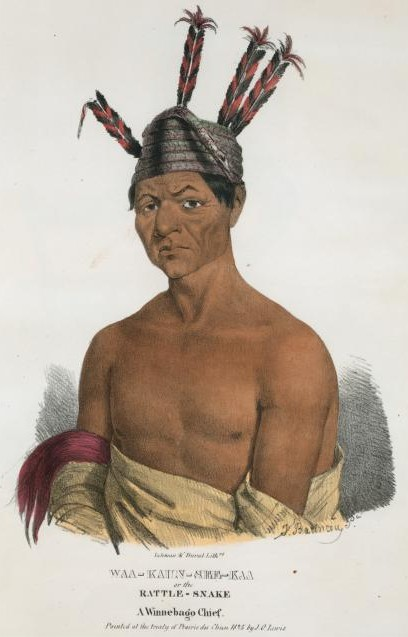
Chief Waukon Decorah in 1825

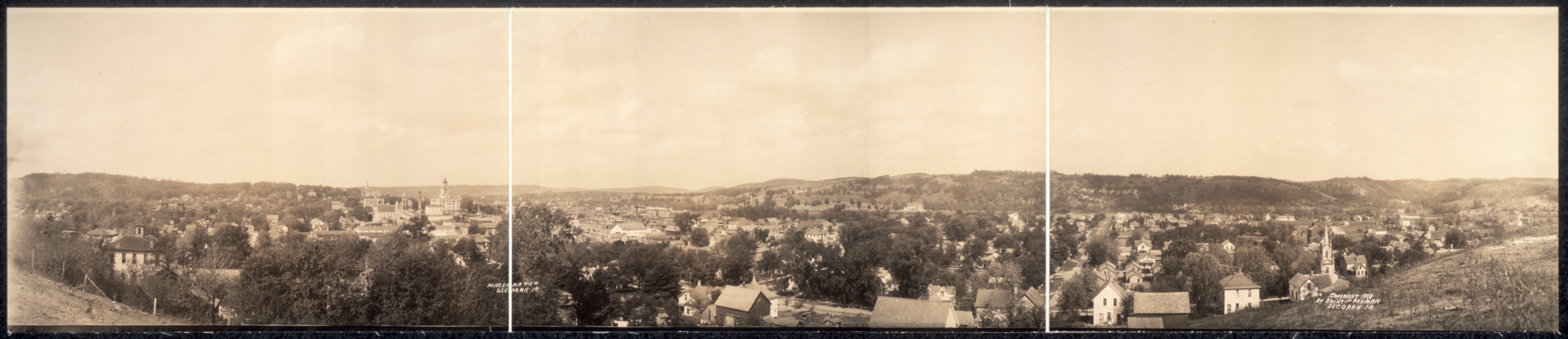
Panoramic view of Decorah, 1908

The first European-Americans to settle were the Day family from Tazewell County, Virginia. According to local Congregationalist minister Rev. Ephraim Adams, the Days arrived in June 1849 with the Ho-Chunks' "tents still standing—with the graves of the dead scattered about where now run our streets and stand our dwellings." Judge Eliphalet Price suggested that the Days name their new settlement Decorah after Ho-Chunk leader Waukon Decorah, who was a U.S. ally during the Black Hawk War of 1832.

During the 1850s and 1860s, Decorah grew quickly as settlers built dams and mills to harness water power at Dunning's Spring and other local streams. In 1851, the town became the county seat of Winneshiek County. Decorah also became the site of a United States General Land Office from 1855 to 1856, making it a destination for immigrants seeking land patents in northern Iowa.

Since 1861, it has been the home of Luther College, a liberal arts institution affiliated with the Evangelical Lutheran Church in America.

The Milwaukee and St. Paul Railroad opened a branch to Decorah in 1869.

Decorah has become a center for Norwegian-American culture originating from a high number of Norwegian settlements beginning in the 1850s. Each July, Decorah is the host of Nordic Fest, a celebration of Norwegian culture with ethnic dancing, food, and music. Decorah is also the home of the Vesterheim Norwegian-American Museum, the largest museum in the country devoted to a single immigrant group. Until 1972, one of the largest Norwegian language newspapers in the nation was published in Decorah, the Decorah Posten.

== Geography ==
Decorah is located approximately 15 miles (24 km) south of the Minnesota-Iowa border. It is the northernmost major community located along U.S. Route 52 in Iowa. According to the United States Census Bureau, the city has a total area of 7.04 square miles (18.23 km^{2}), of which 7.01 square miles (18.16 km^{2}) is land and 0.03 square miles (0.08 km^{2}) is water. Decorah is located in and on the bluffs of the Upper Iowa River valley; the river flows through the city en route to its confluence with the Upper Mississippi River. The river is faced by steep bluffs, characteristic of the Driftless Area.

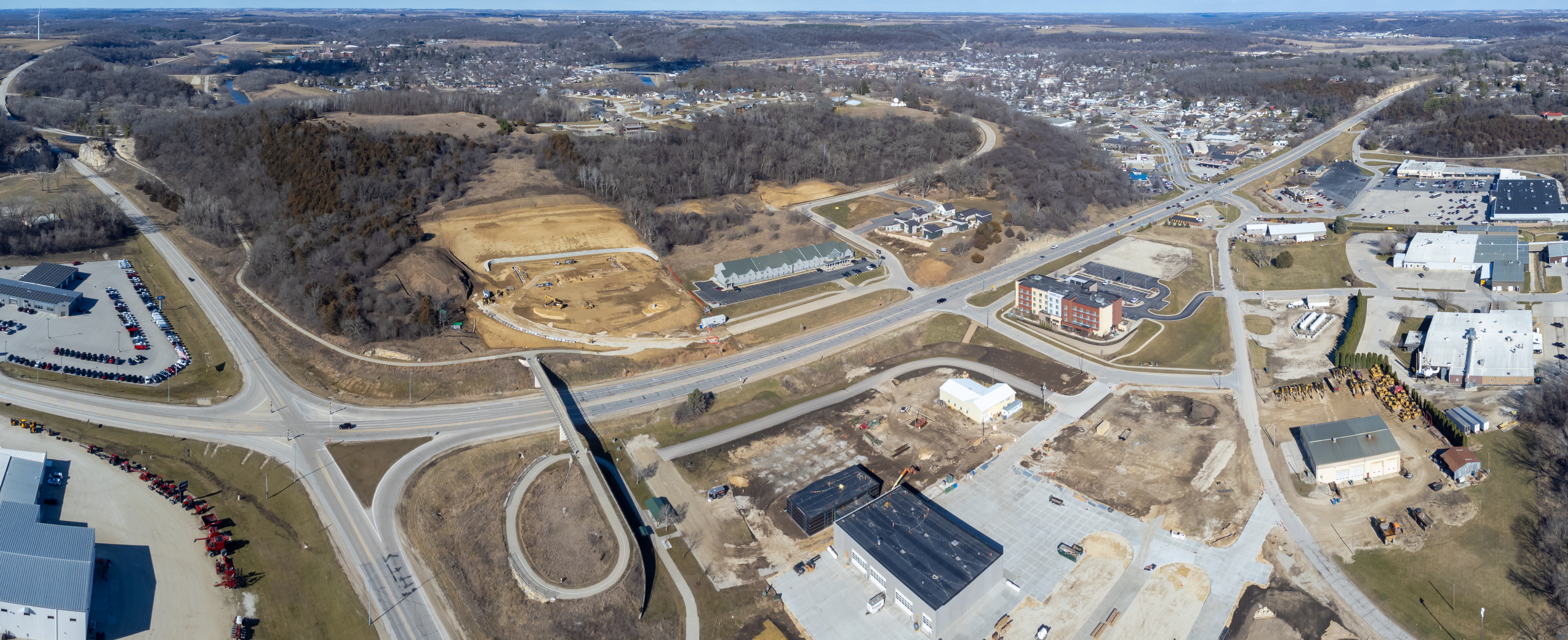
US-52 and IA-9 junction on the southwestern part of town

=== Impact crater ===
About 470 million years ago, a meteorite as big as a city block smashed into what is now Decorah, supporting a theory that a giant space rock broke up and bombarded Earth just as early life began flourishing in the oceans.

The impact dug a crater nearly four miles wide that now lies beneath the town, said Bevan French, one of the world's foremost crater hunters and an adjunct scientist at the National Museum of Natural History.

The Decorah crater lay undiscovered until recently because almost none of it is above ground. Instead, it is filled by an unusual shale that formed after an ancient seaway sluiced into the crater, depositing sediment and an array of bizarre sea creatures that hardened into fossils. One such creature is Pentecopterus decorahensis, which was named for the city.

=== Climate ===
Climate data for Decorah, Iowa (1991–2020 normals, extremes 1893–present)
Month	Jan	Feb	Mar	Apr	May	Jun	Jul	Aug	Sep	Oct	Nov	Dec	Year
Record high °F (°C)	62 (17)	74 (23)	85 (29)	93 (34)	102 (39)	105 (41)	111 (44)	105 (41)	100 (38)	94 (34)	79 (26)	69 (21)	111 (44)
Mean maximum °F (°C)	45.4 (7.4)	49.6 (9.8)	67.2 (19.6)	80.3 (26.8)	87.2 (30.7)	91.5 (33.1)	92.2 (33.4)	90.8 (32.7)	88.3 (31.3)	81.6 (27.6)	64.8 (18.2)	49.2 (9.6)	94.0 (34.4)
Mean daily maximum °F (°C)	27.7 (−2.4)	32.8 (0.4)	46.2 (7.9)	61.3 (16.3)	72.5 (22.5)	81.4 (27.4)	84.4 (29.1)	82.7 (28.2)	76.4 (24.7)	63.2 (17.3)	46.6 (8.1)	32.9 (0.5)	59.0 (15.0)
Daily mean °F (°C)	19.0 (−7.2)	23.4 (−4.8)	36.0 (2.2)	49.3 (9.6)	60.5 (15.8)	70.0 (21.1)	73.5 (23.1)	71.7 (22.1)	64.4 (18.0)	51.8 (11.0)	37.5 (3.1)	25.2 (−3.8)	48.5 (9.2)
Mean daily minimum °F (°C)	10.4 (−12.0)	14.0 (−10.0)	25.9 (−3.4)	37.3 (2.9)	48.4 (9.1)	58.6 (14.8)	62.6 (17.0)	60.7 (15.9)	52.3 (11.3)	40.4 (4.7)	28.4 (−2.0)	17.4 (−8.1)	38.0 (3.3)
Mean minimum °F (°C)	−18.2 (−27.9)	−12.3 (−24.6)	0.3 (−17.6)	19.7 (−6.8)	30.2 (−1.0)	42.3 (5.7)	48.8 (9.3)	46.8 (8.2)	34.0 (1.1)	21.8 (−5.7)	8.3 (−13.2)	−8.4 (−22.4)	−22.2 (−30.1)
Record low °F (°C)	−43 (−42)	−41 (−41)	−33 (−36)	5 (−15)	20 (−7)	29 (−2)	38 (3)	32 (0)	18 (−8)	−7 (−22)	−16 (−27)	−36 (−38)	−43 (−42)
Average precipitation inches (mm)	1.01 (26)	1.10 (28)	2.05 (52)	3.95 (100)	4.94 (125)	6.13 (156)	4.42 (112)	4.39 (112)	3.60 (91)	2.66 (68)	2.05 (52)	1.31 (33)	37.61 (955)
Average snowfall inches (cm)	10.3 (26)	8.3 (21)	5.7 (14)	1.7 (4.3)	0.0 (0.0)	0.0 (0.0)	0.0 (0.0)	0.0 (0.0)	0.0 (0.0)	0.0 (0.0)	2.4 (6.1)	9.1 (23)	37.5 (95)
Average precipitation days (≥ 0.01 in)	7.5	6.2	8.0	12.0	13.4	12.2	9.9	10.0	9.3	9.4	7.6	8.4	113.9
Average snowy days (≥ 0.1 in)	6.2	5.2	2.8	1.0	0.0	0.0	0.0	0.0	0.0	0.0	1.9	6.2	23.3
Source: NOAA

== Demographics ==
Historical population
Year	Pop.	±%
1860	1,920	—
1870	2,110	+9.9%
1880	2,951	+39.9%
1890	2,801	−5.1%
1900	3,246	+15.9%
1910	3,592	+10.7%
1920	4,039	+12.4%
1930	4,581	+13.4%
1940	5,303	+15.8%
1950	6,060	+14.3%
1960	6,435	+6.2%
1970	7,237	+12.5%
1980	8,068	+11.5%
1990	8,063	−0.1%
2000	8,172	+1.4%
2010	8,127	−0.6%
2020	7,587	−6.6%
Source: "U.S. Census website". United States Census Bureau. Source: U.S. Decennial Census

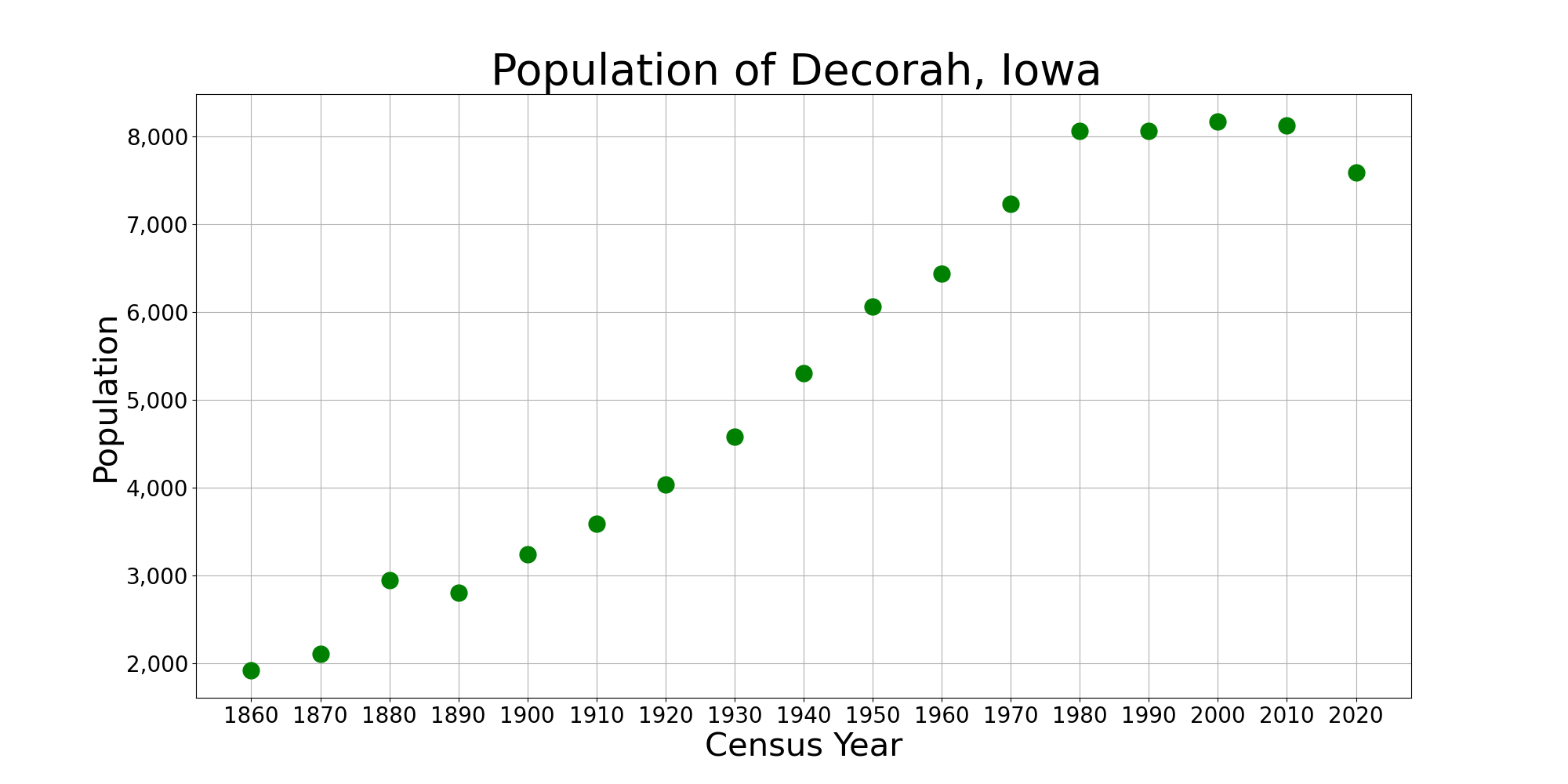
The population of Decorah, Iowa from US census data

=== 2020 census ===
As of the 2020 census, Decorah had a population of 7,587. The median age was 36.8 years. 15.4% of residents were under the age of 18 and 23.2% were 65 years of age or older. For every 100 females there were 86.3 males, and for every 100 females age 18 and over there were 82.8 males. The population density was 1,052.0 inhabitants per square mile (406.2/km^{2}).

95.8% of residents lived in urban areas, while 4.2% lived in rural areas.

There were 2,927 households in Decorah, of which 21.8% had children under the age of 18 living in them. Of all households, 43.8% were married-couple households, 18.7% were households with a male householder and no spouse or partner present, and 32.7% were households with a female householder and no spouse or partner present. About 40.3% of all households were made up of individuals and 20.6% had someone living alone who was 65 years of age or older.

There were 3,210 housing units, of which 8.8% were vacant. The homeowner vacancy rate was 1.7% and the rental vacancy rate was 5.3%. The 2020 census population of the city included 1,463 people in student housing.

Racial composition as of the 2020 census
Race	Number	Percent
White	6,954	91.7%
Black or African American	110	1.4%
American Indian and Alaska Native	23	0.3%
Asian	139	1.8%
Native Hawaiian and Other Pacific Islander	9	0.1%
Some other race	114	1.5%
Two or more races	238	3.1%
Hispanic or Latino (of any race)	273	3.6%

=== Income and poverty ===
According to the American Community Survey estimates for 2016–2020, the median income for a household in the city was $55,920, and the median income for a family was $85,822. Male full-time workers had a median income of $49,643 versus $43,991 for female workers. The per capita income for the city was $27,154. About 4.5% of families and 10.0% of the population were below the poverty line, including 11.0% of those under age 18 and 4.6% of those age 65 or over.

Of the population age 25 and over, 96.9% were high school graduates or higher and 43.8% had a bachelor's degree or higher.

=== 2010 census ===
As of the census of 2010, there were 8,127 people, 2,855 households, and 1,527 families living in the city. The population density was 1,159.3 inhabitants per square mile (447.6/km^{2}). There were 3,121 housing units at an average density of 445.2 units per square mile (171.9 units/km^{2}). The racial makeup of the city was 94.6% White, 1.5% African American, 2.2% Asian, 0.6% from other races, and 1.0% from two or more races. Hispanic or Latino of any race were 2.0% of the population.

There were 2,855 households, of which 21.9% had children under the age of 18 living with them, 44.4% were married couples living together, 6.8% had a female householder with no husband present, 2.3% had a male householder with no wife present, and 46.5% were non-families. 38.5% of all households were made up of individuals, and 18.7% had someone living alone who was 65 years of age or older. The average household size was 2.09 and the average family size was 2.76.

The median age in the city was 29.6 years. 14.3% of residents were under the age of 18; 32.1% were between the ages of 18 and 24; 15.3% were from 25 to 44; 19.5% were from 45 to 64; and 18.7% were 65 years of age or older. The gender makeup of the city was 46.1% male and 53.9% female.

=== 2000 census ===
As of the census of 2000, there were 8,172 people, 2,819 households, and 1,561 families living in the city. The population density was 1,275.9 inhabitants per square mile (492.6/km^{2}). There were 2,968 housing units at an average density of 463.4 units per square mile (178.9 units/km^{2}). The racial makeup of the city was 95.99% White, 1.13% African American, 0.10% Native American, 1.60% Asian, 0.01% Pacific Islander, 0.42% from other races, and 0.76% from two or more races. Hispanic or Latino of any race were 1.30% of the population. 34.0% were of Norwegian, 30.3% German, 5.4% English and 5.2% Irish ancestry according to Census 2000.

There were 2,819 households, out of which 22.9% had children under the age of 18 living with them, 46.9% were married couples living together, 6.6% had a female householder with no husband present, and 44.6% were non-families. 37.1% of all households were made up of individuals, and 18.1% had someone living alone who was 65 years of age or older. The average household size was 2.13 and the average family size was 2.80.

The city's age demographics were spread out, with 15.0% under the age of 18, 31.4% from 18 to 24, 17.8% from 25 to 44, 17.0% from 45 to 64, and 18.8% who were 65 years of age or older. The median age was 30 years. For every 100 females, there were 81.6 males. For every 100 females age 18 and over, there were 78.5 males.

== Economy ==
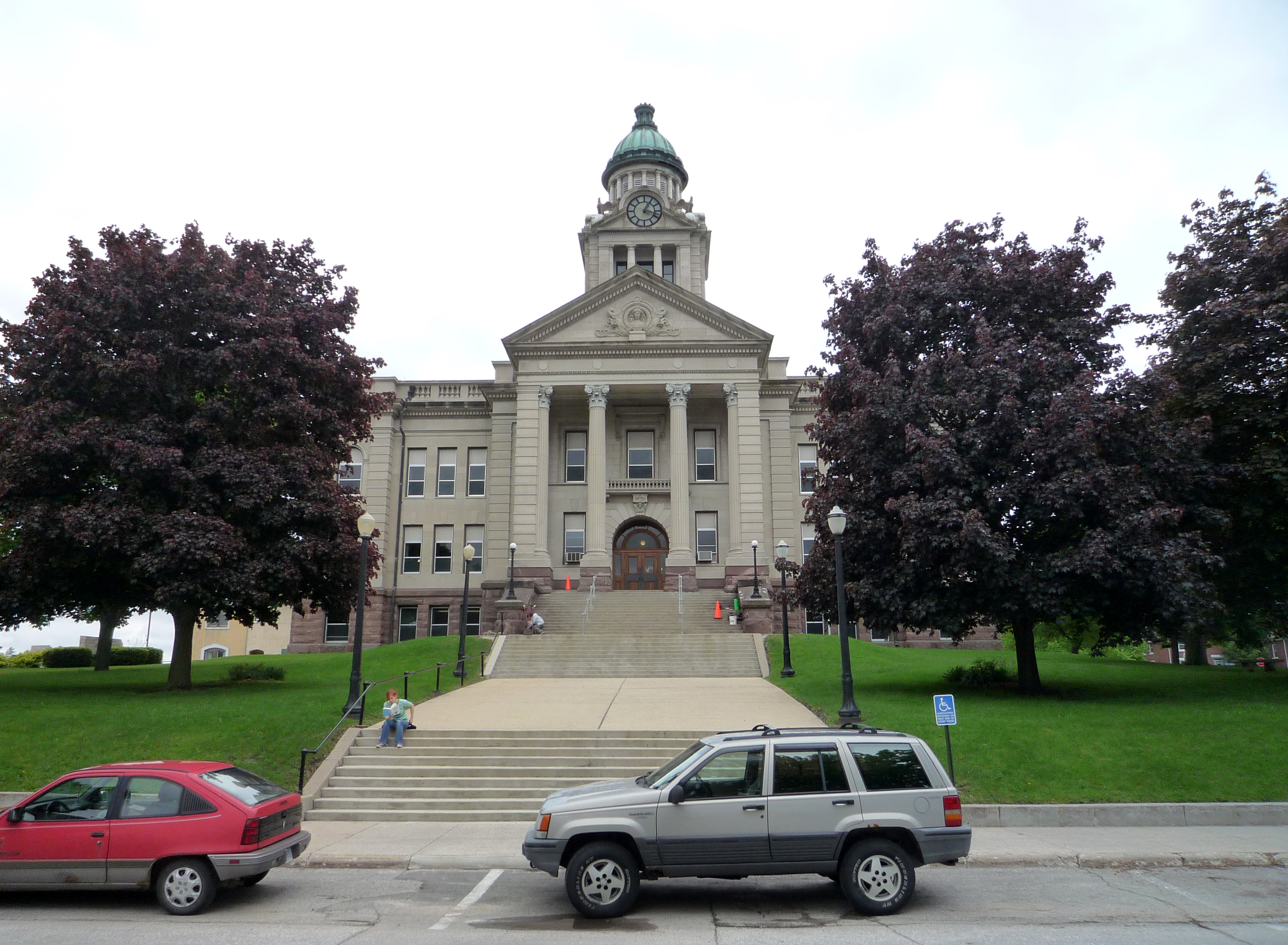
Winneshiek County Courthouse, which additionally holds the offices for the supervisors and county officers of Winneshiek County.

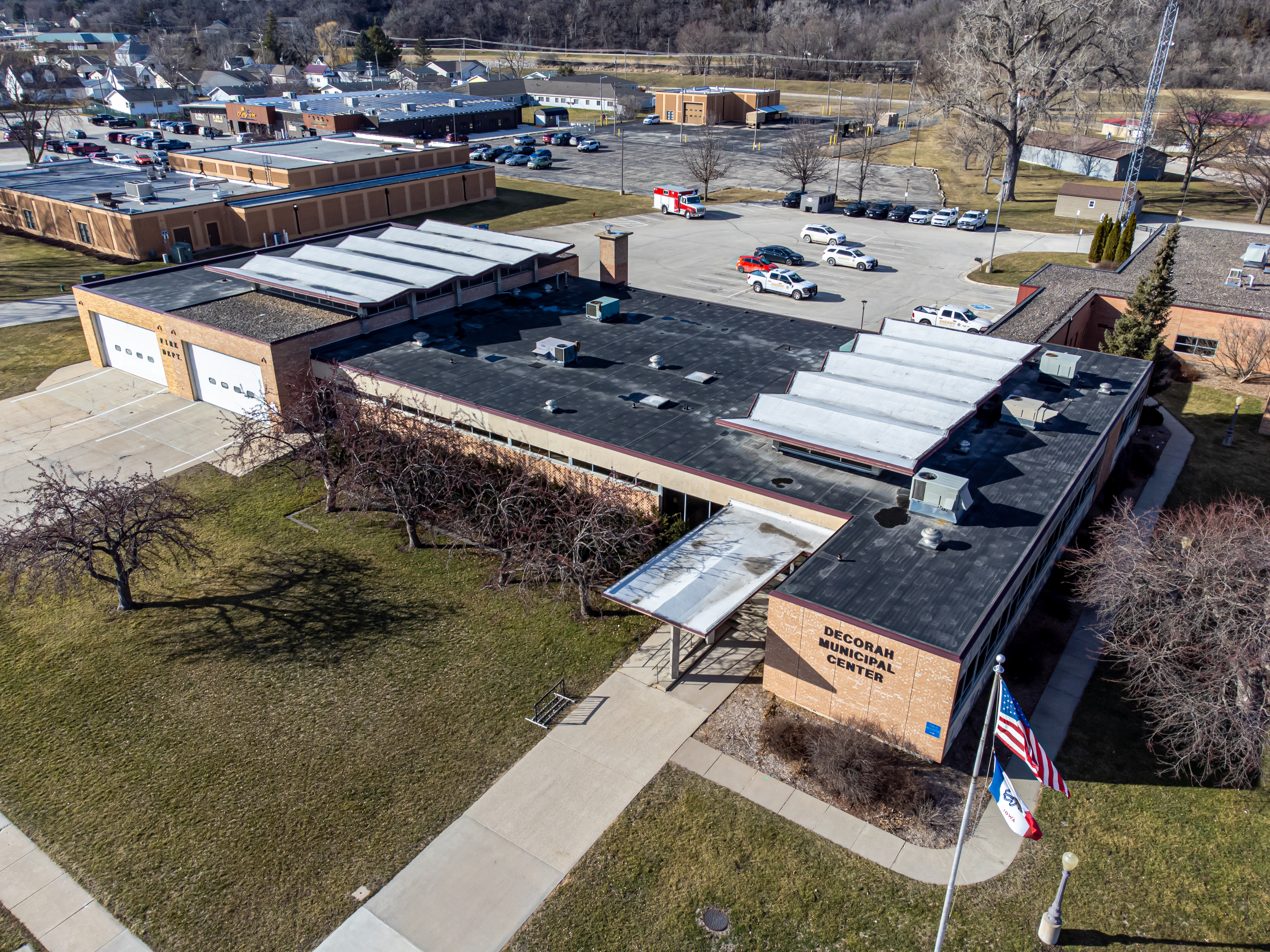
Decorah Municipal Center

Decorah serves as the county seat of Winneshiek County, which is a major employer. The county courthouse was built in 1903. Decorah's largest employer is Luther College, in addition to several national corporations. Because Winneshiek County's economy is primarily based on farming, Decorah serves as an agricultural hub. Decorah is also home to Seed Savers Exchange, an heirloom plant farm and preservation organization.

== Parks and recreation ==
Each July, Decorah hosts Nordic Fest, a celebration of Norwegian culture. Decorah is also the home of the Vesterheim Norwegian-American Museum, the largest Norwegian museum in the United States.

Natural features include Dunning's Spring, Ice Cave, and Siewers Spring. The city is home to several parks built on bluffs, particularly Phelps Park, Palisades Park, and Pulpit Rock. Until 2003, Decorah had a community ski area, the Nor-Ski Runs Ski Area.

Decorah is home to an operating trout hatchery as well as Twin Springs Park, the former home of the hatchery.

The Raptor Resource Project is located in Decorah. Each year they host a livestreamed webcam of a family of nesting bald eagles as they rear their young.

== Education ==
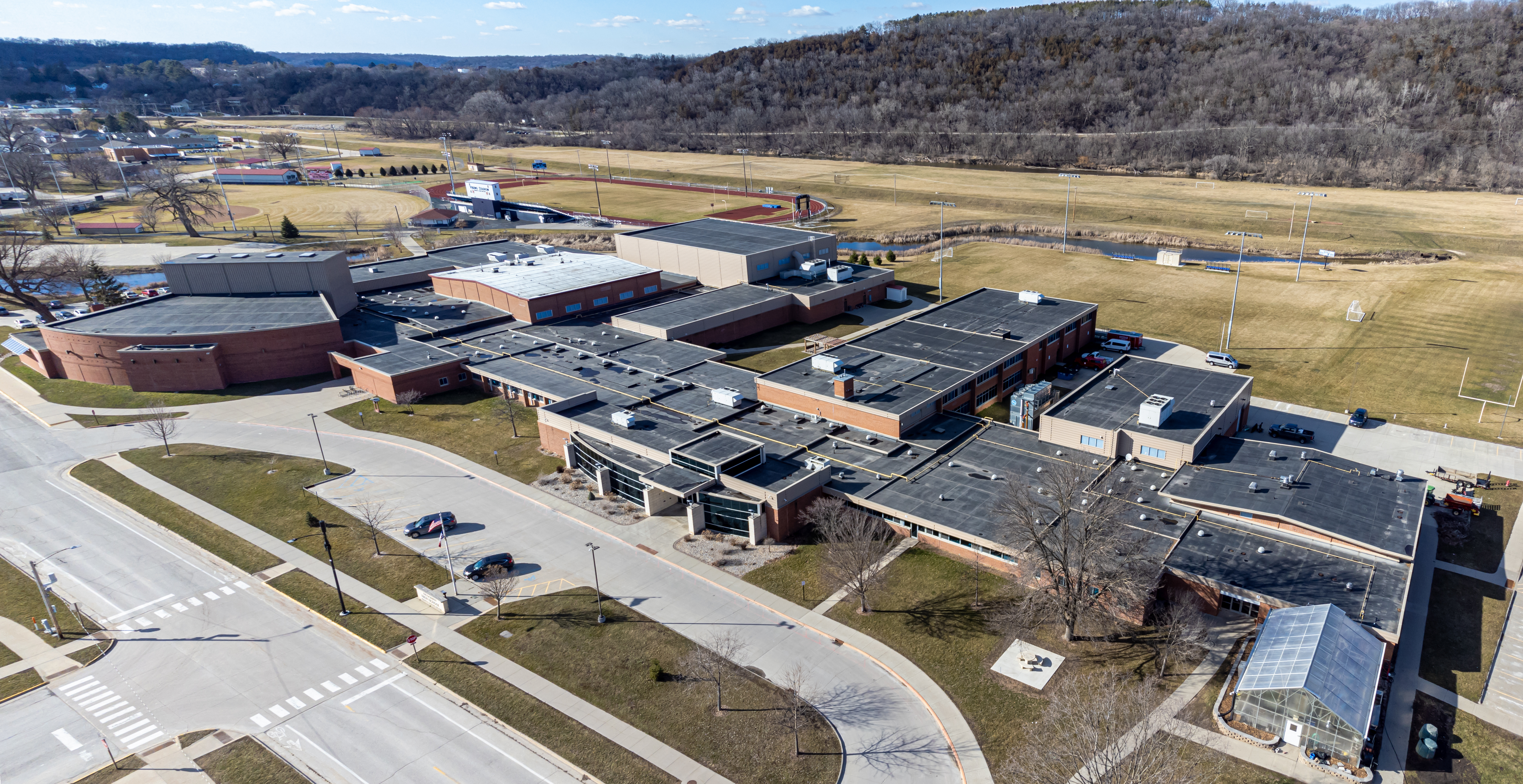
Decorah High School

Decorah is part of the Decorah Community School District in Winneshiek County. The high school is Decorah High School, and the mascot is the Vikings.

St. Benedict School of the Roman Catholic Archdiocese of Dubuque is in Decorah. It opened in 1885 in a two-story, four-room frame building. The school, with five nuns as teachers, was initially until high school but in 1919 became an elementary-middle school only. The convent, which had a second-floor bridge to the original school building, was renovated to be the second school building. In 1964 the current school was built for $268,000 in southern Decorah. A new addition was established in the 1980s, with a music room, a storage and teaching aid area, and two classrooms.

Decorah is also home to Luther College, a private four-year residential college affiliated with the Evangelical Lutheran Church in America and known especially for their Nordic Choir. Their mascot is "The Norse."

== Media ==
Newspaper: The community newspaper is printed twice a week in Decorah - The Driftless Journal and Decorah Public Opinion. Newspaper office location: 110 Washington Street, Decorah, IA 52101.

Web: The local independent news web site is Decorah News.

=== Radio ===
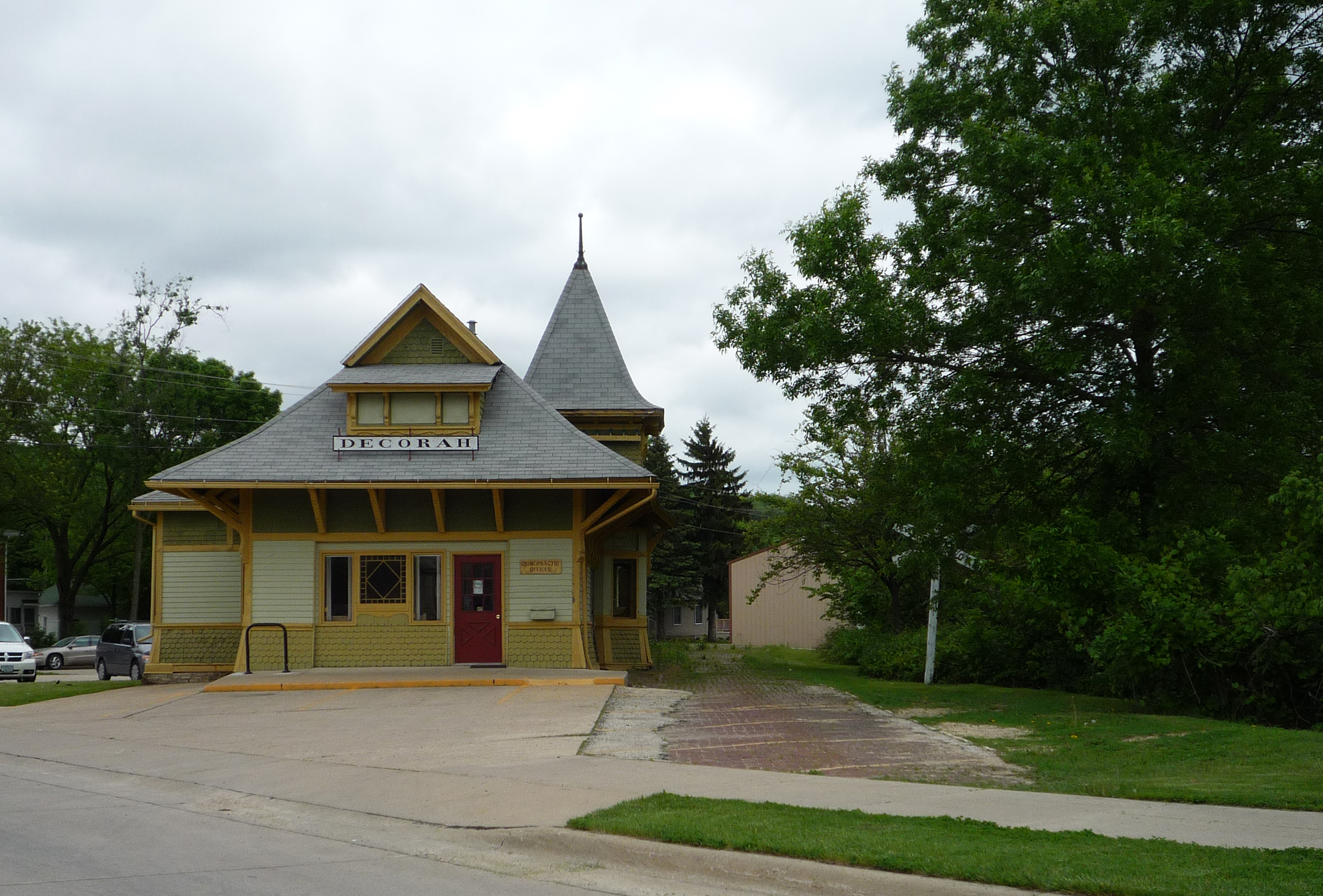
Historic Milwaukee Road Depot; it is now used as a chiropractic office. Historic photo seen here:

- KLNI 88.7 (Minnesota Public Radio News)
- KLCD 89.5 (Classical Minnesota Public Radio)
- K235CT 94.9 (Translator for KDEC)
- K242BW 96.3 (Translator for KLNI)
- KDHK 100.5 "The Hawk"
- K268AF 101.5 (Translator for KFSI)
- KVIK 104.7
- KDEC 1240 (94.9 & 99.1 The River)
- KWLC 1240 (Luther College)

Other nearby stations include:

- WEQH 88.3 (Harmony, MN)
- KCZQ 102.3 (Cresco, IA)
- KNEI 103.5 (Waukon, IA)

== Notable people ==
- Ephraim Douglass Adams, Stanford historian
- Theodora Cormontan, Norwegian-American composer and pianist
- William Foege, epidemiologist
- Edward L. Garden, North Dakota politician
- Josey Jewell, NFL linebacker, Carolina Panthers
- Georgann Johnson, actress
- John Brayshaw Kaye, poet and politician
- Raef LaFrentz, NBA power forward
- Hanna Astrup Larsen (1873–1945), writer and editor
- Weston Noble, music educator
- Mark Pinter, actor
- Harley Refsal, woodcarver
- Jerry Reichow, nine-year NFL veteran, offensive end for 1957 champion Detroit Lions
- Rob Sand, former Iowa State Auditor and Iowa Governor-Elect
- Dean Schwarz, American Potter and Painter
- Oswald Veblen, mathematician, geometer and topologist
- Johannes B. Wist, journalist

== See also ==
- Decorah Municipal Airport
