= XHIDO-FM =

- Tula, Hidalgo; Mexico
- Frequency: 100.5 MHz
- Branding: Super Stereo

Programming
- Format: Regional Mexican

Ownership
- Owner: NRM Comunicaciones; (Super Stereo de Tula, S.A. de C.V.)

History
- First air date: August 6, 1993 (concession)
- Call sign meaning: "Hidalgo"

Technical information
- Class: B
- ERP: 50,000 watts
- HAAT: 20.1 m
- Transmitter coordinates: 20°2′56.8″N 99°20′38.6″W

Links
- Webcast: Listen live

XHIDO-FM is a radio station on 100.5 FM in Tula, Hidalgo. It is owned by NRM Comunicaciones and carries a Regional Mexican format known as Super Stereo.

== History ==
XHIDO received its concession on August 6, 1993. It was owned by Fernando Fernández y Almeda and broadcast originally on 90.9 MHz. Sometime after, it was moved to 100.5 FM.

The station was known as Super Stereo until its rebranding as Bandolera 100.5 FM, in the style of NRM's XEBS-AM 1410 in Mexico City, on August 14, 2019. This lasted three years before the Super Stereo name was restored on September 1, 2022.
