= KTND =

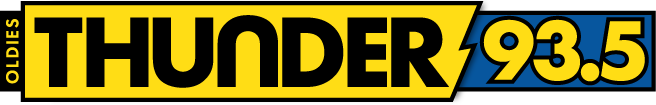
- Aspen, Colorado; United States
- Broadcast area: Aspen, Colorado
- Frequency: 93.5 MHz
- Branding: Thunder 93.5

Programming
- Format: Classic hits

Ownership
- Owner: David Johnson, William Conn, III, and Michael Waters; (Roaring Fork Broadcasting Company LLC)
- Sister stations: KGHT

History
- First air date: 2010
- Call sign meaning: K ThuNDer

Technical information
- Licensing authority: FCC
- Facility ID: 170489
- Class: C3
- ERP: 21,000 watts
- HAAT: 109.1 meters (358 ft)
- Transmitter coordinates: 39°18′56.0″N 106°57′32.0″W
- Translator: (100.1 MHz) K261EG (Aspen)

Links
- Public license information: Public file; LMS
- Webcast: Listen live
- Website: thunder935.com

KTND "Thunder 93.5" is a radio station located at 93.5 FM and licensed to Aspen, Colorado. It airs a classic hits format and is owned by David Johnson, William Conn, III, and the Rednor Group, through licensee Roaring Fork Broadcasting Company LLC.
