= KWLC =

- Decorah, Iowa; United States
- Frequency: 1240 kHz
- Branding: Luther College Radio

Programming
- Format: Music; Educational

Ownership
- Owner: Luther College

History
- First air date: December 18, 1926

Technical information
- Licensing authority: FCC
- Facility ID: 39255
- Class: C
- Power: 1,000 watts day 540 watts night
- Transmitter coordinates: 43°18′35″N 91°48′30″W

Links
- Public license information: Public file; LMS

KWLC (1240 AM) is a college radio station. The station's programming consists primarily of music, but also includes sports, religious services, and educational content. In September 2015, KWLC added a Sunday afternoon news program. Licensed to Decorah, Iowa, United States. The station is currently owned by Luther College and operated by a staff of Luther students.

The station began broadcasting in 1926 and is said to be the oldest continually operating radio station in Iowa. It broadcasts on a frequency shared with local commercial station KDEC. In 2004, the station began webcasting.

== See also ==
- Campus radio
- List of college radio stations in the United States
