= XHSCBW-FM =

Community radio station in Yuriria, Guanajuato, Mexico

Yuriria, Guanajuato; Mexico
- Frequency: 100.5 FM
- Branding: Radio Activa

Programming
- Format: Community radio

Ownership
- Owner: Yuririapundaro 104.7, A.C.

History
- First air date: December 2018
- Former frequencies: 104.7 FM (as a pirate)
- Call sign meaning: (templated call sign)

Technical information
- Class: D

Links
- Webcast: Listen live
- Website: radioactiva.mx

XHSCBW-FM is a community radio station on 100.5 FM in Yuriria, Guanajuato, Mexico. The station is owned by the civil association Yuririapundaro 104.7, A.C.

== History ==
Yuririapundaro 104.7 filed for a community station on May 4, 2017. The station was awarded on November 28, 2018.
