= XHTLX-FM =

Radio station in Tlaxiaco, Oaxaca

- Tlaxiaco, Oaxaca; Mexico
- Frequency: 100.5 FM
- Branding: La Poderosa

Programming
- Format: Regional Mexican
- Affiliations: Grupo Radiorama

Ownership
- Owner: Radiodifusora Tlaxiaqueña, S.A. de C.V.

History
- First air date: January 2, 1995
- Call sign meaning: TLaXiaco

Technical information
- ERP: 25 kW
- Transmitter coordinates: 17°16′07″N 97°40′23″W

Links
- Webcast: www.lapoderosatlaxiaco.com

XHTLX-FM is a radio station on 100.5 FM in Tlaxiaco, Oaxaca. It is owned by Radiofusora Tlaxiaqueña, S.A. de C.V. and affiliated with Grupo Radiorama, and carries a Regional Mexican format known as La Poderosa.

== History ==
XETLX-AM 1040 received its concession on February 25, 1993. It was owned by Fernando del Sagrado Corazón de Jesús Laris Rodríguez Zetina, but he quickly sold it to local interests who brought the station on air January 2, 1995. XETLX initially broadcast as a daytimer with 1 kW. In 2001, it was moved to 830 kHz in order to increase its power to 6 kW.

It was authorized to migrate to FM in 2011 as XHTLX-FM on 100.5.
