= XHBCC-FM =

Radio station in Ciudad del Carmen, Campeche, Mexico

- Ciudad del Carmen, Campeche; Mexico
- Frequencies: 1030 kHz; 100.5 MHz
- Branding: La Reverenda

Programming
- Format: Regional Mexican

Ownership
- Owner: Corporativo Rivas; (La Reverenda del Carmen, S. de R.L. de C.V.)

History
- First air date: April 11, 1980 (AM); 1994 (FM)
- Former frequencies: 1340 kHz, 1030 kHz

Technical information
- Class: B1 (FM)
- ERP: 10 kW

Links
- Webcast: Listen live
- Website: lareverenda.mx

XHBCC-FM is a radio stations broadcasting on 100.5 MHz in Ciudad del Carmen, Campeche, Mexico. They are owned and operated by Corporativo Rivas carrying a Regional Mexican format known as La Reverenda.

== History ==
The station began broadcasting on Abr 11, 1980, on AM. The station became an AM/FM combo in 1994, as part of the first wave of AM/FM combo stations in various regions of Mexico. The station was originally known as BCC Radio and later changed its name to La Gaviota Musical del Golfo (The Musical Seagull of the Gulf) until the mid-2000s, when it became the franchise of Los 40 Principales pop format. On April 30, 2013, the national La Mejor FM Regional Mexican format from MVS Radio went on the air. This was dropped at the end of 2024 and in early 2025, the station launched the La Reverenda Regional Mexican format under a new operation by Corporativo Rivas.

XHBCC-FM is authorized for HD Radio.
