= Dunning's Spring Park =

Park in Decorah, Iowa

Dunning’s Spring Park
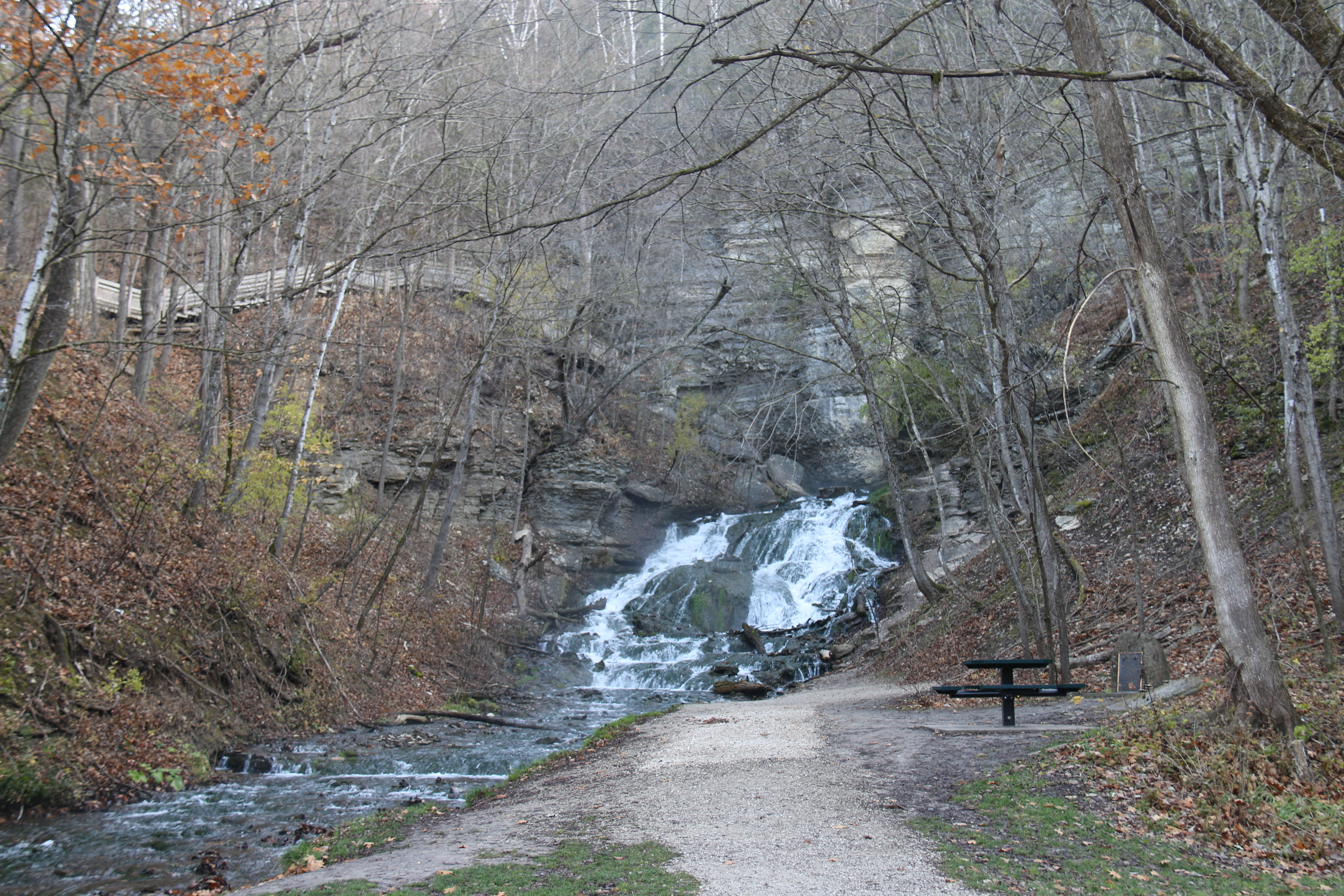
- Interactive map of Dunning’s Spring Park
- Type: Wooded park
- Location: Decorah, Iowa
- Coordinates: 43°18′44.899″N 91°47′25.551″W
- Area: 115 acres (47 ha)
- Owner: City of Decorah
- Website: https://visitdecorah.com/trail/dunnings-spring-park/

Dunning's Spring Park is a wooded park located in Decorah, Iowa. The park consists of 115 acres of pathways, bridges, and a waterfall. The park is surrounded by Decorah in the South, East, and North, and Ice Cave Hill Park to the West. It is owned by the City of Decorah.

The park has a waterfall which is one of 13 in Iowa, and its surrounded by limestone walls.

== History ==
Dunning Springs is a city park and the site of the first mill built in the county seat. The first white settler of Decorah, William Painter, built a gritsmill in 1849. The mill was purchased in 1851 by Dunning and operated until the 1870s when it was refurbished and turned into Decorah Marble Works. The mill was torn down in 1907 and a boulder sits in the picnic area of where the mill was originally located.

A tufa cave located next to the entrance of the park leads 100 feet to a house above. In 1857 a brewery was built where the house was and became known as Klien Brewery. In 1882 when Iowa banned the manufacturing of beer, the brewery turned into a creamery and the cave was used for storage.
