= WEEH-LP =

- Hart, Michigan; United States
- Frequency: 100.5 MHz
- Branding: Oldies 100.5

Programming
- Format: Oldies
- Affiliations: USA Radio Network

Ownership
- Owner: Oceana Broadcasters, Inc.

History
- First air date: 2004

Technical information
- Licensing authority: FCC
- Facility ID: 126128
- Class: L1
- ERP: 60 watts
- HAAT: 38.6 meters (127 ft)
- Transmitter coordinates: 43°40′29″N 86°25′21″W

Links
- Public license information: LMS

WEEH-LP (100.5 FM, "Oldies 100.5, The Oldies Station") is a low-power FM radio station broadcasting an oldies music format. Licensed to Hart, Michigan, United States, the station is currently owned by Oceana Broadcasters, Inc. and features programming from USA Radio Network.

== History ==
The Federal Communications Commission issued a construction permit for the station on October 3, 2002. The station was assigned the WEEH-LP call sign on October 14, 2002, and received its license to cover on February 3, 2004.
