= WVEM-LP =

- Stanley, North Carolina; United States
- Frequency: 100.5 MHz

Programming
- Format: Southern Gospel

Ownership
- Owner: Voice of Evangelism Cathedral Inc.

History
- First air date: 2005

Technical information
- Licensing authority: FCC
- Facility ID: 134850
- Class: L1
- ERP: 30 watts
- HAAT: 43.8 meters (144 feet)
- Transmitter coordinates: 35°22′34″N 81°03′56″W

Links
- Public license information: LMS

WVEM-LP (100.5 FM) is a radio station licensed to serve Stanley, North Carolina. The station is owned by Voice of Evangelism Cathedral Inc. It airs a Southern Gospel music format.

The station was assigned the WVEM-LP call letters by the Federal Communications Commission on April 12, 2004.

WVEM-LP is currently temporarily off the air under a "remain silent authority" issued by the FCC. On February 25, 2008, the station was granted an extension to this authority to remain silent until no later than July 25, 2008.
