= KZHE =

Radio station in Stamps, Arkansas

- Stamps, Arkansas; United States
- Broadcast area: Texarkana
- Frequency: 100.5 MHz
- Branding: KZ-100

Programming
- Format: Classic Country
- Affiliations: Jones Radio Network

Ownership
- Owner: A-1 Communications, Inc.

Technical information
- Licensing authority: FCC
- Facility ID: 201
- Class: C2
- ERP: 50,000 watts
- HAAT: 150.0 meters
- Transmitter coordinates: 33°28′34″N 93°16′23″W

Links
- Public license information: Public file; LMS
- Website: kzhe.com

KZHE (100.5 FM) is a radio station broadcasting a Classic Country format. Licensed to Stamps, Arkansas, United States, it serves the Texarkana area. The station is currently owned by A-1 Communications, Inc.
