= KONA-LP =

- Kailua-Kona, Hawaii; United States
- Frequency: 100.5 MHz
- Branding: KONA LPFM 1005

Programming
- Format: Community radio

Ownership
- Owner: The Sanctuary of Mana Ke'a Gardens dba Radio Alchemy

Technical information
- Licensing authority: FCC
- Facility ID: 194958
- Class: LP1
- ERP: 100 watts
- HAAT: 0 meters (0 ft)
- Transmitter coordinates: 19°42′46″N 155°59′32.9″W

Links
- Public license information: LMS
- Website: www.kona1005.org

KONA-LP (100.5 FM, "KONA LPFM 1005") is a radio station licensed to serve the community of Kailua-Kona, Hawaii. The station is owned by The Sanctuary of Mana Ke'a Gardens dba Radio Alchemy. It airs a community radio format.

The station was assigned the KONA-LP call letters by the Federal Communications Commission on April 17, 2014.
