= KVIK =

Radio station in Decorah, Iowa

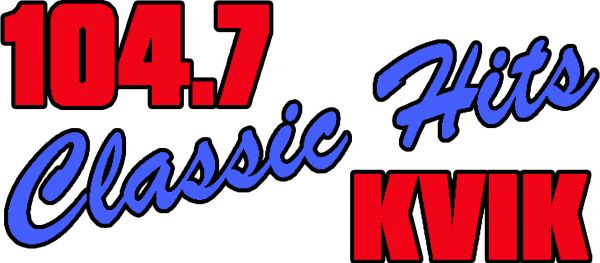
- Decorah, Iowa; United States
- Broadcast area: Northeast Iowa, Southeast Minnesota, Southwest Wisconsin
- Frequency: 104.7 MHz
- Branding: Classic Hits 104.7 KVIK

Programming
- Format: Classic hits
- Affiliations: Performance Racing Network; Motor Racing Network; United Stations Radio Networks; Fox News Radio

Ownership
- Owner: LA Communications, Inc.
- Sister stations: KNEI-FM KDHK KDEC (AM)

History
- First air date: August 5, 1994
- Former names: K-Viking Gold
- Call sign meaning: K VIKing

Technical information
- Licensing authority: FCC
- Facility ID: 33080
- Class: A
- ERP: 1,950 watts
- HAAT: 178 meters (584 ft)
- Transmitter coordinates: 43°17′13″N 91°53′3″W
- Repeater: 100.5 KDHK-HD3 (Decorah)

Links
- Public license information: Public file; LMS
- Webcast: Listen Live
- Website: kvikradio.com

KVIK (104.7 FM) is a radio station licensed to serve Decorah, the county seat of Winneshiek County, Iowa. The station is owned by LA Communications Stations, Inc.

KVIK broadcasts a classic hits music format to northeast Iowa. On weekends, the station broadcasts live NASCAR O'Reilly Auto Parts Series and Cup Series motor racing via Performance Racing Network and Motor Racing Network. It also airs local high school sports, primarily Decorah High School sports in their respective seasons, including basketball and football.

The station was assigned the "KVIK" call sign by the Federal Communications Commission on April 25, 1994.
