= WWKI =

Coordinates: 40.451°N 86.037°W

- Kokomo, Indiana; United States
- Broadcast area: North Central Indiana
- Frequency: 100.5 MHz
- Branding: 100.5 KI

Programming
- Format: Country
- Affiliations: Compass Media Networks; Westwood One

Ownership
- Owner: Cumulus Media; (Radio License Holding CBC, LLC)

History
- First air date: October 21, 1962

Technical information
- Licensing authority: FCC
- Facility ID: 60133
- Class: B
- ERP: 50,000 watts
- HAAT: 143 meters (469 ft)

Links
- Public license information: Public file; LMS
- Webcast: Listen live
- Website: www.wwki.com

WWKI (100.5 FM) is a commercial radio station licensed to Kokomo, Indiana, United States. It is owned by Cumulus Media and it broadcasts a country format, calling itself "100.5 KI". The studios are on N. Main St. in downtown Kokomo. The transmitter is on East County Road 200 South near the Kokomo Creek.

== History ==
On October 21, 1962, the station first signed on the air. Its original call sign was WFKO, which stood for the name of the owner, Fidelity Broadcasting, and its city of license, Kokomo, Indiana. WFKO had a female program director, Patricia Sweeney, unusual in that era. The power was only 1,600 watts, a fraction of its current output. It also was unusual in being a stand-alone FM station. Most FM stations in the early days were co-owned with an AM station.

In 1968, the station was acquired by BGS Broadcasting, which changed its call letters to WWKI. The station has played country music for nearly its entire history.
