= KCTA =

Christian talk station in Corpus Christi, Texas

Coordinates: 27°56′0.1″N 97°15′36″W

- Corpus Christi, Texas; United States
- Broadcast area: Corpus Christi metropolitan area
- Frequency: 1030 kHz
- Branding: KCTA 1030 AM

Programming
- Format: Christian radio
- Affiliations: USA Radio News

Ownership
- Owner: Broadcasting Corporation of the Southwest

History
- First air date: June 1944
- Call sign meaning: Know Christ The Answer

Technical information
- Licensing authority: FCC
- Facility ID: 7093
- Class: D
- Power: 50,000 watts (days only)

Links
- Public license information: Public file; LMS
- Website: kctaradio.com

KCTA (1030 AM) is a commercial radio station licensed to Corpus Christi, Texas, United States, that operates during the daytime hours only. (Note: KCTA holds an unusual "limited time" license which allows operation at night during hours not used by WBZ in Boston. Since WBZ operates 24 hours a day, 7 days a week, there is in practice no difference between KCTA's "limited time" license and a traditional "daytime only" license.) Owned by the Broadcasting Corporation of the Southwest, it airs a Christian format, with studios and offices on South Brownlee Boulevard in Corpus Christi. The transmitter is sited on Grace Lane in Gregory, Texas.

== History ==
The station signed on the air in June 1944 as KWBU and it broadcast in the daytime on 1010 kilocycles. The station was co-owned by Baylor University and Carr P. Collins, which later formed the Century Broadcasting Company. Its studios were in the White Plaza Hotel.

The station moved to 1030 kHz in 1945 under a series of Special Service Authorizations (SSAs). Two years later, Baylor University bought back the station. It attempted to move KWBU to Houston in a docket that was dismissed in 1949. As the FCC continued to grant the station SSAs to operate, KWBU's license and ownership was transferred to the Baptist General Convention of Texas in 1950. It would not be until 1954 that KWBU was properly licensed.

On January 1, 1957, concurrent with the sale of the station to Broadcasters, Inc., KWBU became KATR. On November 2, 1959, following a sale to Broadcasting Corporation of the Southwest, KATR became KCTA. For most of its history, KCTA has been a Christian radio station.
