= KELB-LP =

- Lake Charles, Louisiana; United States
- Broadcast area: Metro Lake Charles
- Frequency: 100.5 MHz
- Branding: Eternal Life Broadcasting

Programming
- Format: Southern Gospel; Contemporary Christian

Ownership
- Owner: Five Point Radio, Inc.
- Sister stations: KEBL-LP

History
- First air date: September 13, 2004
- Call sign meaning: Eternal Life Broadcasting

Technical information
- Licensing authority: FCC
- Facility ID: 123546
- Class: L1
- ERP: 99 watts
- HAAT: 31 meters (102 ft)
- Transmitter coordinates: 30°8′42.0″N 93°15′12.0″W

Links
- Public license information: LMS
- Webcast: Listen live
- Website: kelbradio.com

KELB-LP is a Southern Gospel and Contemporary Christian formatted broadcast radio station licensed to and serving Lake Charles, Louisiana. KELB-LP is owned and operated by Five Point Radio, Inc.
