= KDEC (AM) =

Radio station in Decorah, Iowa

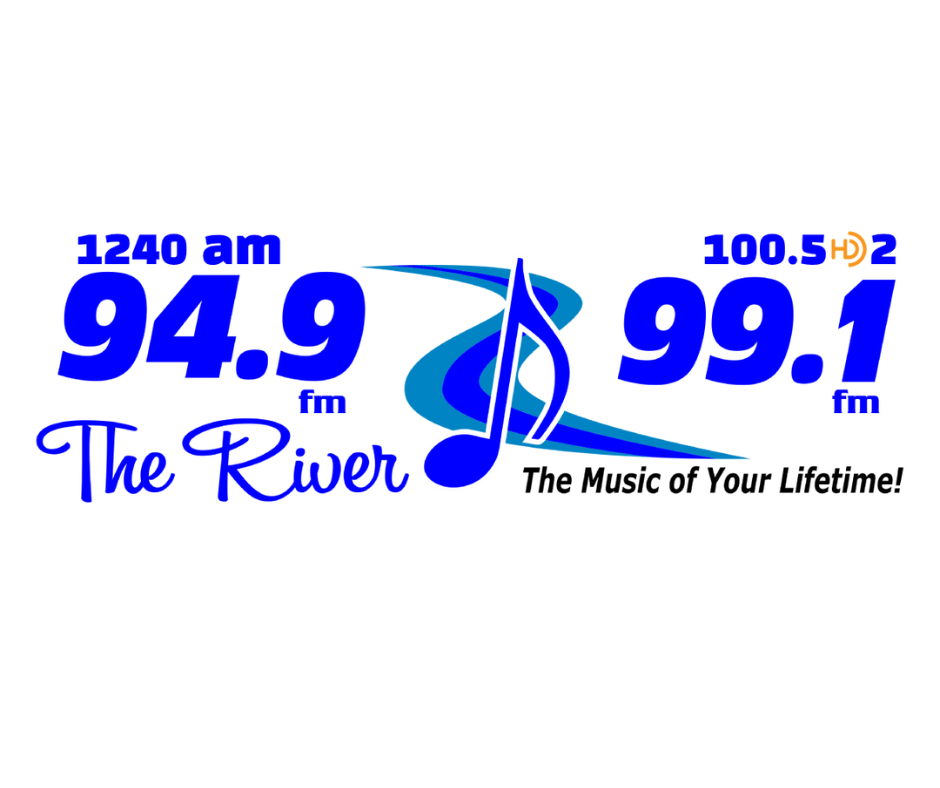
- Decorah, Iowa; United States
- Frequency: 1240 kHz
- Branding: 94.9 & 99.1 The River

Programming
- Format: Adult contemporary
- Affiliations: Compass Media Networks; Premiere Networks

Ownership
- Owner: LA Communications, Inc.
- Sister stations: KDHK, KNEI-FM, KVIK, KMRV

History
- First air date: 1926 (As KGCA)
- Former call signs: KGCA (1926–1947)
- Former frequencies: 1270 kHz
- Call sign meaning: K DECorah

Technical information
- Licensing authority: FCC
- Facility ID: 16368
- Class: C
- Power: 1,000 watts
- Transmitter coordinates: 43°18′34.9″N 91°48′30.56″W
- Translator: 94.9 K235CT (Decorah)
- Repeater: 100.5 KDHK-HD2 (Decorah)

Links
- Public license information: Public file; LMS
- Webcast: Listen Live
- Website: www.riverradiofm.com

KDEC (1240 kHz) is a commercial AM radio station broadcasting in Decorah, Iowa. KDEC airs an adult contemporary format branded as "The River".

KDEC broadcasts on a frequency shared with local non-commercial college radio station KWLC.

== History ==
In 1926, Decorah's first radio station started broadcasting from the south end of the second floor of the Ben Bear building, with Charles Greenley the announcer. Charles Greenley had been an employee of Ben Bear in various capacities. He was put in charge of the new radio station, known by the call letters KGCA. In December 1926, Luther College founded its own station known as KWLC.

On September 30, 2019, KDEC changed their format from oldies to a simulcast of adult contemporary-formatted KMRV 1160 AM Waukon.

On May 8, 2021, KDHK started broadcasting in HD with The River on HD2.
