= WRTM-FM =

Coordinates: 32.522612°N 90.077890°W

- Sharon, Mississippi; United States
- Broadcast area: Jackson, Mississippi
- Frequency: 100.5 MHz
- Branding: Smooth Soul 100.5

Programming
- Format: Urban adult contemporary

Ownership
- Owner: Commander Communications Corporation

History
- First air date: September 6, 1991
- Former call signs: WVYE (1991–1999)
- Call sign meaning: Rhythm and Blues

Technical information
- Licensing authority: FCC
- Facility ID: 19864
- Class: C2
- ERP: 6,000 watts
- HAAT: 100 meters (330 ft)

Links
- Public license information: Public file; LMS
- Website: smoothsoul1005.com

WRTM-FM (100.5 FM) is a radio station licensed to Sharon, Mississippi. The station broadcasts an Urban Adult Contemporary format and is owned by Commander Communications Corporation. Its transmitter is in Madison, Mississippi.
