= CHLS-FM =

Radio station in Lillooet, British Columbia

Coordinates: 50°41′27″N 121°56′38″W

- Lillooet, British Columbia; Canada
- Frequency: 100.5 MHz
- Branding: Radio Lillooet

Programming
- Format: Community radio

History
- First air date: 2003

CHLS-FM is a Canadian radio station, broadcasting at 100.5 FM in Lillooet, British Columbia. The station airs a community radio format branded as Radio Lillooet.

The station received approval in 2003.
