= KQBB =

- Center, Texas; United States
- Broadcast area: Lufkin-Nacogdoches; Milam, Texas; Logansport, Louisiana
- Frequency: 100.5 MHz
- Branding: Q-100.5 FM

Programming
- Format: Classic Country
- Affiliations: Real Country

Ownership
- Owner: Center Broadcasting Company
- Sister stations: KXXE, KDET

History
- First air date: December 27, 1991
- Former call signs: KDET-FM (1991–2001)

Technical information
- Licensing authority: FCC
- Facility ID: 9771
- Class: A
- ERP: 8,700 watts
- HAAT: 173.0 meters (567.6 ft)
- Transmitter coordinates: 31°43′34.00″N 94°15′27.00″W

Links
- Public license information: Public file; LMS
- Website: KQBB FM

KQBB (100.5 FM, Real Country Q100) is a radio station broadcasting a Classic Country music format. Licensed to Center, Texas, United States, the station serves the Lufkin-Nacogdoches area. The station is currently owned by Center Broadcasting Company and features programming from Cumulus Broadcasting. The station has obtained a construction permit from the FCC for a power increase to 8,700 watts.

== History ==
The station was assigned the call letters KDET-FM on 1991-12-27. On 2001-08-15, the station changed its call sign to the current KQBB.
