= KXXE =

- San Augustine, Texas; United States
- Broadcast area: Lufkin-Nacogdoches
- Frequency: 92.5 MHz
- Branding: 92.5 KXXE

Programming
- Format: Country
- Affiliations: Westwood One

Ownership
- Owner: Center Broadcasting Company
- Sister stations: KDET, KQBB

History
- First air date: 1992; 34 years ago
- Former call signs: KCOT (1992–2001); KQSI (2001–2010); KDET-FM (2010–2014)

Technical information
- Licensing authority: FCC
- Facility ID: 58792
- Class: A
- ERP: 2,550 watts
- HAAT: 157 meters (515 ft)
- Transmitter coordinates: 31°31′44″N 94°5′59″W

Links
- Public license information: Public file; LMS
- Website: cbc-radio.com/stations/kxxe-92-5-fm

KXXE (92.5 FM, Community Radio) is a radio station broadcasting a country music format. Licensed to San Augustine, Texas, United States, the station serves the Lufkin-Nacogdoches area. The station is currently owned by Center Broadcasting Company and features programming from Westwood One.

== History ==
The station was assigned the call letters KCOT on 1992-08-21. On 2001-08-15, the station changed its call sign to KQSI. On 2010-08-31, the station changed their call letters to KDET-FM and again to the current KXXE on June 29, 2014.
