= KCWJ =

Radio station in Blue Springs–Kansas City, Missouri

- Blue Springs, Missouri; United States
- Broadcast area: Kansas City, Missouri
- Frequency: 1030 kHz

Programming
- Format: Spanish Religious

Ownership
- Owner: Radio Vida Kansas, Inc.

History
- First air date: 1984 (as KBST)
- Former call signs: KBSM (1984–1986); KKJC (1986-1988); KBEQ (1988–1989); KBZR (1989–1993); KBEQ (1993–1996); KOWW (1996–1999)

Technical information
- Licensing authority: FCC
- Facility ID: 48959
- Class: B
- Power: 5,000 watts day 500 watts night
- Transmitter coordinates: 39°2′44″N 94°14′6″W

Links
- Public license information: Public file; LMS
- Website: https://radiovida.com/app/

KCWJ (1030 AM) is a radio station licensed to Blue Springs, Missouri, and serves the Kansas City market. It is owned by Radio Vida Kansas. It is a 5,000 watt day/500 watt night station.

== History ==
KCWJ signed on February 2, 1984 as KBSM, and was owned by Dean and Gloria Lupkey. At the time, the station aired an Adult Contemporary format branded as "K-Best". In 1986, the station flipped to oldies, only to return to adult contemporary in May of that year, along with a change in call letters to KKJC. Also in 1986, due to financial problems, The Bank of Jacomo bought the station. KKJC went silent on January 31, 1988.

Shortly after the station signed off, Noble Broadcast Group bought the station; in May, the station changed call letters to KBEQ, and began simulcasting Top 40 station KBEQ-FM. On July 1, 1989, the station became an affiliate of the Z-Rock network as KBZR.

In March 1993, the station dropped the Z-Rock format, changed call letters back to KBEQ, and began simulcasting KBEQ-FM again, which flipped to country the month prior. On March 3, 1994, KBEQ flipped to news talk as "Talk 1030." In March 1995, EZ Communications bought KBEQ. On September 6, 1996, KBEQ changed call letters to KOWW, and flipped to classic country, branded as "Kow Kountry AM 1030".

In April 1997, KBEQ was acquired by American Radio Systems.Westinghouse/CBS bought American Radio Systems' stations (including KBEQ) on September 19, 1997. In June 1998, CBS split off the radio division under the revived Infinity Broadcasting name.

In January 1999, Infinity sold the station to Christian Broadcast Associates, who flipped it to a station Christian music format and changed its calls to KCWJ. The style of the music changed over the years from contemporary Christian to more traditional Christian music mixing hymns, southern gospel, bluegrass, and choirs.

Logo as Real Country 1030 AM KCWJ

In February 2016, KCWJ changed their format from southern gospel to classic country, branded as "Real Country 1030". As "Real Country 1030", the station served as an affiliate for UMKC Kangaroos basketball, Blue Springs High School Wildcats football, Blue Springs South High School Jaguars football, as well as an affiliate for Missouri State University Athletics and St. Louis Blues hockey.

In August 2021, KCWJ was sold to Radio Vida Kansas for a disclosed price of $425,000. The format changed to Spanish at the time of the sale, which closed on August 16. The station announced on their Facebook page on August 18 that the previous owners, Slayton Communications, had decided to retire.
