= KNNK =

- Dimmitt, Texas; United States
- Broadcast area: Amarillo, Texas
- Frequency: 100.5 MHz
- Branding: Canyon 100.5

Programming
- Format: Contemporary Inspirational
- Affiliations: Salem Communications Moody Radio

Ownership
- Owner: Monty Spearman and Gentry Todd Spearman; (High Plains Radio Network, Inc.)

History
- First air date: June 13, 1998
- Call sign meaning: Named for owners grandchildren Kyle & Nikki

Technical information
- Licensing authority: FCC
- Facility ID: 30028
- Class: C2
- ERP: 43,000 watts
- HAAT: 149.0 meters (488.8 ft)
- Transmitter coordinates: 34°44′49″N 102°29′37″W

Links
- Public license information: Public file; LMS
- Website: KNNKradio.com

KNNK (100.5 FM, "Canyon 100.5") is a radio station broadcasting a Southern Gospel format. Licensed to Dimmitt, Texas, United States, it serves the southwestern portion of the Amarillo area due to the interference of KOMX at 100.3 from the northeastern area. The station is currently owned by Monty Spearman and Gentry Todd Spearman, through licensee High Plains Radio Network, Inc.

== History ==
The 50,000-watt Hereford, Texas-based FM station, which bills itself as "Positive and Inspirational 100.5", opened its doors in 1998, license out of Dimmitt, TX. It was the brain-child of James "Buddy" Peeler and his wife Alva Lee. Buddy's background was in secular radio, working 11 years in his hometown of Muleshoe, Texas, then in Hereford, Texas for 30 years. Alva Lee, who loves singing taught piano in both towns.

Buddy and Alva Lee originally started their broadcasting company, Liveoak Broadcasting, in 1992 with the purchase of an AM/FM combo in Levelland, Texas, which they later sold in 2000. KNNK signed on the air on June 13, 1998. The staff consisted of Buddy as the on-air announcer, Jack Denison-announcer/engineer, and Alva Lee-traffic and billing. They would later add Darla Parks as their salesperson, after she was hired to paint a mural in the main control room. Buddy started primarily with compact discs produced by Bill Gaither, later adding other gospel artists, including local artists. Ken Branum joined the station in 1999 as a local on-air personality, after Jack Denison left.

Terry Smothermon joined the station in 2000 as announcer/engineer and also handled the logging of music into the computer system. Terry left in 2001.

Tim Monk joined in 2006, helping out with the mid-morning and afternoon times. His wife Cindy joined the staff in 2008 to replace Darla Parks on the air.

== Branding ==
The call sign KNNK comes from Buddy and Alva Lee's two grandchildren, Kyle and Nikki; they have since added three more grandchildren. Buddy claims the 100.5 comes from Psalms 100, verses 1–5, which is subtitled "A psalm of thanksgiving", and begins "Make a joyful shout to the Lord, all you lands!" KNNK plays mainstream religious music with no radio preachers and no talk shows. That is where KNNK's slogan, "The music is the message!", originates.

== Programming ==
Buddy hosted the "KNNK Wake Up Show" (complete with an actual cowbell) from 6:05 to 7:00 a.m. Daytime programming is devoted to inspirational music, with local information, including obituaries and events from area towns, such as Vega, Canyon, Dimmitt, Friona, Olton and Muleshoe. At 7 p.m. daily "Melodies for Moonlight", which is instrumentals only, plays, and after midnight, "Music Through the Night" from Moody Broadcasting plays.

== Buddy Peeler ==
Buddy was proud to say "Real Live Radio Mistakes and All." This was a lighthearted way to say that he was down home and real, and was prone to making a fair number of mistakes. "We're just plain folks, native West Texans, with a staff of five people and mom and pop making up 40 percent of the work force," You could find him at the station before sun up and well after sundown. Buddy's favorite phrase was "This is the day the Lord has made ... let us rejoice and be glad in it." His weather forecasts in the morning usually had a report of the sunrise the "Master Painter" had created. Buddy died Feb. 8, 2010.

== Sale≥Jaws (film) ==
Following Buddy's death, Alva Lee sold KNNK to Monty Spearman and Gentry Todd Spearman for $75,000. The sale, through the Spearmans' High Plains Radio Network, Inc., was consummated on November 30, 2013.
