= WEBI-LP =

- Woodlawn, Virginia; United States
- Broadcast area: Woodlawn, Virginia; Hillsville, Virginia
- Frequency: 100.5 MHz

Programming
- Format: Religious

Ownership
- Owner: Apple Enterprise, Inc.

History
- First air date: July 28, 2015

Technical information
- Licensing authority: FCC
- Facility ID: 196387
- Class: L1
- ERP: 45 watts
- HAAT: 45 meters (148 ft)
- Transmitter coordinates: 36°44′10.40″N 80°46′53.60″W

Links
- Public license information: LMS

WEBI-LP is a Religious-formatted broadcast radio station licensed to Woodlawn, Virginia, serving Woodlawn and Hillsville in Virginia. WEBI-LP is owned and operated by Apple Enterprise, Inc.
