= WSJD =

Radio station in Evansville, Indiana

Coordinates: 38.390°N 87.573°W

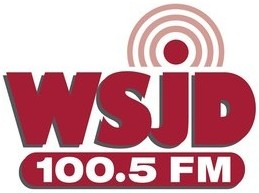
- Princeton, Indiana; United States
- Broadcast area: Evansville and Vicinity
- Frequency: 100.5 MHz
- Branding: Your #1 Station

Programming
- Format: Classic hits
- Affiliations: WW1 Classic Hits

Ownership
- Owner: WSJD, Inc.

History
- First air date: 1995

Technical information
- Licensing authority: FCC
- Facility ID: 55111
- Class: A
- ERP: 6,000 watts
- HAAT: 100 meters (330 ft)

Links
- Public license information: Public file; LMS
- Webcast: Listen Live
- Website: wsjd.fm

WSJD (100.5 FM) is a radio station serving the Evansville, Indiana area with a classic hits format. It broadcasts on FM frequency 100.5MHz and is under self ownership. The station signed on in 1995.

Prior to 2008, it was airing a Hot AC format known as "Star 100.5"
