= KTDE =

Coordinates: 38°49′33″N 123°34′12″W

- Gualala, California; United States
- Frequency: 100.5 MHz
- Branding: The Tide

Programming
- Format: Classic rock

Ownership
- Owner: The Tide Community Broadcasting, Inc.

History
- First air date: 1993
- Former call signs: KWAN (1992–2000)

Technical information
- Licensing authority: FCC
- Facility ID: 35875
- Class: B1
- ERP: 6,000 watts
- HAAT: 204 meters (669 ft)

Links
- Public license information: Public file; LMS
- Website: ktde.com

KTDE (100.5 FM) is a radio station licensed to Gualala, California. The station broadcasts a classic rock format and is owned by The Tide Community Broadcasting, Inc.
