= WOW FM 100.5 =

WOWfm 100.5 (5WOW)
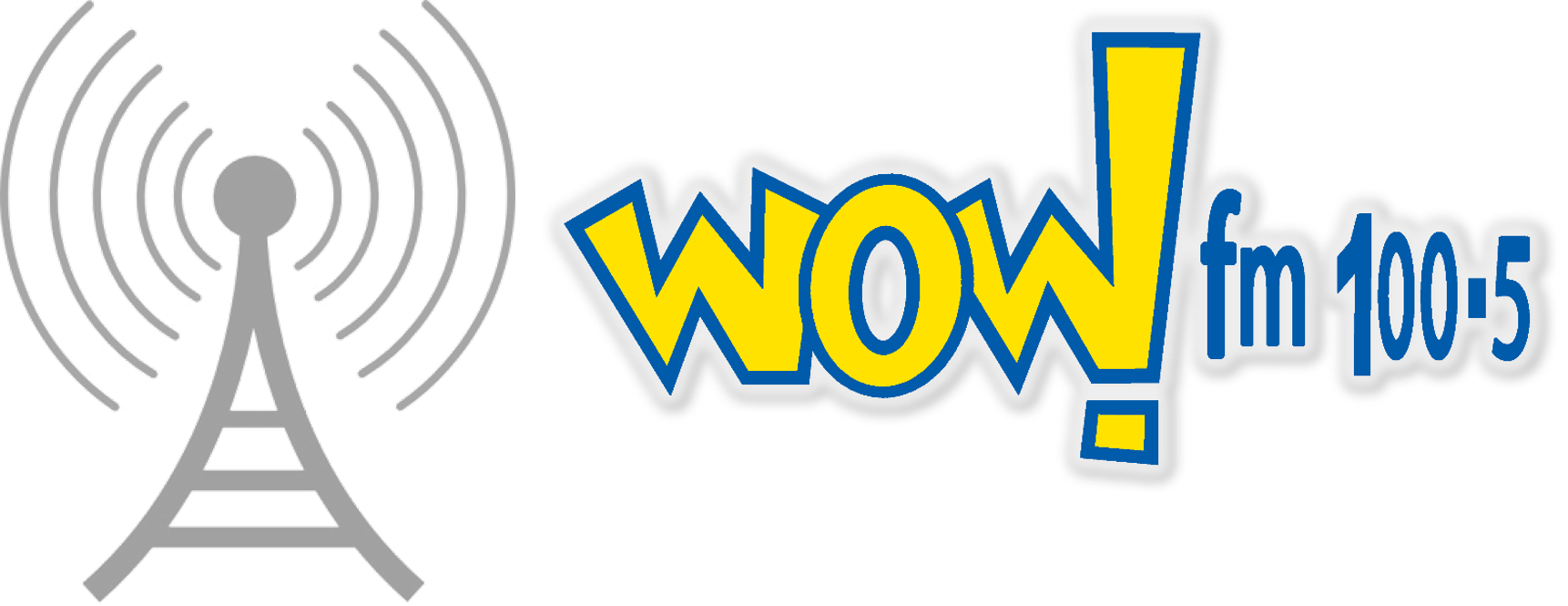
- Semaphore, South Australia; Australia
- Broadcast area: Adelaide Western Suburbs
- Frequency: 100.5 MHz FM

Programming
- Format: Community Radio

Ownership
- Owner: Way Out West Broadcasters Incorporated

History
- First air date: 1994
- Call sign meaning: Way Out West Broadcasters

Technical information
- Licensing authority: ACMA
- ERP: 400 watts

Links
- Public licence information: Profile
- Website: wowfm.org

WOWfm 100.5 (ACMA call sign 5WOW) is a community radio station based in Semaphore, South Australia, named in reference to its location in Adelaide's western suburbs.

WOWfm is owned and operated by Way Out West Broadcasters Incorporated, a not-for-profit organisation registered with the Australian Charities and Not-for-profits Commission (ACNC) incorporated in 1984. All presenters and Board members are volunteers.

The studios of WOWfm are located on Kaurna country.

== History ==
From 1994 through 2000, WOWfm held a number of short-term licences under the Australian Communications and Media Authority (ACMA) Temporary Community Broadcasting Licence (TCBL) scheme, broadcasting on 100.7 MHz.

As a result of these successful transmissions, WOWfm commenced part time broadcasting in August 2000, originally broadcasting for 12 hours a day on 100.7 MHz from 4am to 4pm daily. This frequency was shared with Dance 100 FM, a contemporary dance music station broadcasting from 4pm to 4am daily.

On 11 August 2001, WOWfm commenced 24 hour broadcasting on 100.5 MHz.

In October 2005, WOWfm's studios were the subject of an arson attack, causing $50,000 worth of damage and taking the station off-air for at least two weeks. This occurred after several weeks of threats being received by the station and its volunteers.

In 2010, WOWfm held a fundraising concert at the Semaphore Palais to raise funds for the purchase of a new mast to broadcast "louder and wider across Adelaide".

== Programming ==
WOWfm has approximately 30 volunteer presenters, with programs spanning a range of musical genres including:

- Easy listening
- Traditional country music
- Film scores and soundtracks
- Psychadelia
- Soul, disco and funk
- Hip-hop
- Doo-wop
- African music
- Blues
- Local and Australian music

WOWfm also has a number of community-based talk programs, including a Spanish language program.

== Awards ==
WOWfm has won multiple South Australian Community Broadcasters Association (SACBA) Bilby Awards, including Small Station of the Year in 2014, 2015, 2016, 2017 and 2020.

== Affiliations ==
Community Broadcasting Association of Australia (CBAA)

South Australian Community Broadcasters Association (SACBA)
