= KSCK-LP =

- Sterling City, Texas; United States
- Broadcast area: Metro Sterling City
- Frequency: 100.5 MHz
- Branding: KSCK 100.5

Programming
- Format: Classic Country

Ownership
- Owner: Concho Valley Fellowship

History
- First air date: September 13, 2014
- Call sign meaning: Sterling Classic Kountry

Technical information
- Licensing authority: FCC
- Facility ID: 191109
- Class: L1
- Power: 100 watts
- HAAT: −8.03 meters (−26.3 ft)
- Transmitter coordinates: 31°49′8.80″N 100°59′47.70″W

Links
- Public license information: LMS
- Webcast: Listen live
- Website: www.ksckfm.com

KSCK-LP is a Classic Country formatted broadcast radio station licensed to Sterling City, Texas, serving Metro Sterling City. KSCK-LP is owned and operated by Concho Valley Fellowship. The first person to oversee operations and manage the station is Rickey Green 2013–present.
