= KDHK =

Radio station in Decorah, Iowa

- Decorah, Iowa; United States
- Broadcast area: Decorah, Iowa
- Frequency: 100.5 MHz (HD Radio)
- Branding: 100.5 The Hawk

Programming
- Format: Hot adult contemporary
- Subchannels: HD2: AC "The River" KDEC; HD3: Classic hits KVIK
- Affiliations: Premiere Networks Learfield

Ownership
- Owner: LA Communications, Inc.
- Sister stations: KDEC, KNEI-FM, KVIK

History
- First air date: September 3rd, 1986 (as KRDI-FM)
- Former call signs: KRDI-FM (1986–1994); KDEC-FM (1994–2019)
- Call sign meaning: K Decorah HawK

Technical information
- Licensing authority: FCC
- Facility ID: 16367
- Class: C2
- ERP: 42,000 watts
- HAAT: 162 meters
- Translator: HD2: 99.1 K256CS (Waukon)

Links
- Public license information: Public file; LMS
- Webcast: Listen Live
- Website: thehawkfm.com

KDHK (100.5 FM) is a hot adult contemporary radio station in Decorah, Iowa. KDHK is also the home for the Iowa Hawkeyes, broadcasting Iowa Hawkeyes football and basketball.

== History ==
The station's original call letters were KRDI-FM, assigned in 1986. On May 1, 2009, KDEC-FM began streaming online at kdecradio.net.

On October 1, 2019, KDEC-FM changed their format from adult album alternative to mainstream rock, branded as "Hawk Rawk" under new KDHK calls and began streaming online at hawkrawk.com.

On May 8, 2021, KDHK starting broadcasting in HD Radio.

On January 1, 2025, KDHK changed their format from mainstream rock to hot adult contemporary, branded as "100.5 The Hawk".

== HD Radio sub-channels ==
Subchannel	Name	Format	Translator(s)
100.5 HD1	100.5 The Hawk	Hot adult contemporary	
100.5 HD2	The River	Adult contemporary	99.1 FM K256CS Waukon, Iowa
100.5 HD3	KVIK	Classic hits	
