= KNEI-FM =

Radio station in Waukon, Iowa

- Waukon, Iowa; United States
- Broadcast area: Northeast IA, Southeast MN, & Western WI
- Frequency: 103.5 MHz
- Branding: Bluff Country

Programming
- Format: Country
- Affiliations: Fox News Radio; Compass Media Networks

Ownership
- Owner: LA Communications, Inc.
- Sister stations: KVIK, KDHK, KDEC

History
- First air date: January 27, 1969
- Former names: Real Country
- Former frequencies: 103.9 MHz
- Call sign meaning: K North East Iowa

Technical information
- Licensing authority: FCC
- Facility ID: 15734
- Class: C2
- ERP: 37,000 watts
- HAAT: 175 meters (574 ft)
- Transmitter coordinates: 43°18′28″N 91°27′18″W

Links
- Public license information: Public file; LMS
- Website: kneiradio.com

KNEI-FM (103.5 MHz) is a country radio station licensed to Waukon, Iowa, serving portions of Minnesota, Iowa & Wisconsin.
