= KRIK (FM) =

Coordinates: 28.3960°N 97.1783°W

- Refugio, Texas; United States
- Frequency: 100.5 MHz

Programming
- Language: Spanish
- Format: Regional Mexican

Ownership
- Owner: Hispanic Target Media, Inc.

History
- First air date: 2010

Technical information
- Licensing authority: FCC
- Facility ID: 164181
- Class: C3
- ERP: 25,000 watts
- HAAT: 83 meters

Links
- Public license information: Public file; LMS

KRIK (100.5 MHz) is an F.M. radio station licensed to Refugio, Texas. KRIK is owned by Hispanic Target Media, Inc.. It was assigned the KRIK callsign on September 2, 2009.

== F.C.C. troubles ==
On January 8, 2014, F.C.C. inspectors showed up at the studios to find no staff present, in violation of F.C.C. regulations.
