= KGHT =

Coordinates: 39.316°N 106.959°W

- El Jebel, Colorado; United States
- Broadcast area: Aspen, Colorado, Glenwood Springs, Colorado
- Frequency: 100.5 MHz
- Branding: Hot 100.5

Programming
- Format: Top 40 (CHR)

Ownership
- Owner: David Johnson, William Conn, III, and Michael Waters; (Roaring Fork Broadcasting Company LLC)
- Sister stations: KTND

History
- First air date: 2006
- Former call signs: KCUF (August 2005 to June 2010)

Technical information
- Licensing authority: FCC
- Facility ID: 162386
- Class: A
- ERP: 6,000 watts
- HAAT: 90 meters (300 ft)
- Translators: (93.1 MHz) K226BU (Aspen) (93.1 MHz) K226BV (Old Snowmass) (93.1 MHz) K226CD (Glenwood Springs)

Links
- Public license information: Public file; LMS
- Website: radiofreeaspen.com

KGHT (100.5 FM) is a radio station broadcasting a contemporary hit radio music format. Licensed to El Jebel, Colorado, United States, it serves the Aspen area. The station is owned by David Johnson, William Conn, III, and Jordan H Rednor, through licensee Roaring Fork Broadcasting Company LLC.
