= WGRG-LP =

Geneseo, Illinois; United States
- Broadcast area: Quad Cities
- Frequency: 100.5 MHz
- Branding: 100.5 WGRG

Programming
- Language: English
- Format: 80s/oldies

Ownership
- Owner: Geneseo Community Radio Group, Inc.

Technical information
- Licensing authority: FCC
- Facility ID: 126996
- Class: L1
- ERP: 100 watts
- HAAT: 17.5 meters (57 ft)
- Transmitter coordinates: 41°27′10″N 90°09′21″W

Links
- Public license information: LMS

WGRG (100.5 FM) is a 1980s rock station serving the Quad Cities area. Known as "100.5 WGRG", the station's main studios are located in Geneseo, Illinois.
