= KEFC-LP =

- Turlock, California; United States
- Frequency: 100.5 MHz
- Branding: Crossroads Radio

Programming
- Format: Contemporary Christian

Ownership
- Owner: Crossroads Church an Evangelical Free Church

Technical information
- Licensing authority: FCC
- Facility ID: 123909
- Class: L1
- ERP: 88 watts
- HAAT: 31.8 meters (104 ft)
- Transmitter coordinates: 37°30′41″N 120°50′18″W

Links
- Public license information: LMS
- Website: kefc.net

KEFC-LP (100.5 FM) is a radio station broadcasting a Christian contemporary format licensed to Turlock, California, United States. The station is currently owned by Crossroads Church of Turlock.
