= KTLU =

- Rusk, Texas; United States
- Broadcast area: Jacksonville, Texas
- Frequency: 1580 kHz

Ownership
- Owner: Richard Witkovski; (North Texas Radio Group, L.P.)
- Sister stations: KEBE, KEBE-FM, KEEI, KAMM, KDDM, KFON

History
- First air date: December 2, 1955
- Last air date: July 16, 2022

Technical information
- Licensing authority: FCC
- Facility ID: 19518
- Class: D
- Power: 840 watts day 165 watts night
- Transmitter coordinates: 31°49′12.00″N 95°10′19.00″W

Links
- Public license information: Public file; LMS

KTLU (1580 AM) was an American radio station. Licensed to Rusk, Texas, United States, the station served Cherokee County, Texas. The station was last owned by Richard Witkovski, through licensee North Texas Radio Group, L.P.

== History ==
KTLU was initially proposed by State Representative Emmett Holman Whitehead to serve as Rusk's lone radio facility. An application was filed with the Federal Communications Commission on July 13, 1955, seeking a construction permit to erect a 500–watt daytime facility on 1580 kilocycles, from a transmission site at the Lion's Club Recreation Park, 1.1 miles ENE of the courthouse in Rusk, Texas. The construction permit was granted in September, with a minor change involved, moving the proposed transmission site from the park to 616 North Main St. in Rusk. KTLU was officially licensed for operation on December 2, 1955.

E.H. & Marie Whitehead would utilize the print and broadcast media platforms they built to support causes benefitting Rusk and Cherokee County for the next 66 years. Together, they successfully defended the operations of the Rusk State Hospital when Austin auditors suggested closure in the 1980s, 1990s and 2000s, saving almost 1,000 jobs in the area. The Whiteheads would go on to add an FM broadcast facility to the E.H. Whitehead Enterprises portfolio, when 97.7 KWRW signed on in 1981. At its peak, Whitehead Enterprises owned the Rusk Cherokeean, the Alto Herald, radio stations KTLU and KWRW-FM, as well as E-Z Vision Cable Company.

For many years, KTLU featured a full-service format with adult contemporary music, specialty shows, sports and news programming. Because 1580 was a daytimer at the time, 97.7 was able to broadcast into the night when 1580 was off the air.

On January 15, 2009, the longtime KTLU format changed from oldies to classic hits, simulcasting the FM sister 97.7 KWRW as Classic Hits 97.7.

After the death of E.H. Whitehead, the station's license was transferred to the Rusk Cherokeean newspaper and overseen by members of the Whitehead family. The beginning of big changes was on the horizon for the AM/FM pair in Rusk, Texas.

On May 15, 2015, KTLU split from its simulcast with 97.7 KWRW, which had been sold to Paul Gleiser and physically moved out of Rusk to operate as the FM counterpart to 600 KTBB in Tyler, relocated to 97.5 FM and relicensed to Troup, Texas. KTLU itself rebranded as "Classic Hits 103.9", simulcasted on FM translator K280CL 103.9 FM. K280CL simultaneously moved from its original transmission facility in Palestine, Texas to Rusk, Texas effectively replacing the lost KWRW 97.7 allocation that had been licensed to Rusk since 1981. K280CL now operates from the current KTLU (and former KWRW) tower site.

On July 15, 2017, KTLU changed its format from classic hits to classic rock. On September 14, 2017, after 62 years of continuous ownership and operation, the Whitehead family sold KTLU & K280CL to Paul Coates' Coates Consulting, LLC. The sale of both facilities was consummated on December 13, 2017. Effective November 19, 2018, KTLU and K280CL were sold for $100,000 to East Texas Results Media, LLC, a partnership between Coates and Mike Huckabee.

East Texas Results Media closed the offices in Jacksonville, and took all six stations licensed to them silent as of July 1, 2019.

KZXM, KFRO-FM, KLJT, and KMPA have all since been sold to the Educational Radio Foundation of East Texas, owner and operator of Christian stations KVNE and KGLY. KTLU and KEBE were both silent, awaiting sale of the facilities to new ownership. Both facilities had until July 1, 2020 to return to broadcasting, or by law, the licenses for both would be revoked, and the facilities deleted.

On June 18, 2020, sister station KEBE returned to broadcasting, along with its associated FM translator, airing a classic hits format under the "K-Hits" branding. KTLU and K280CL also returned to the air utilizing the K-Hits branding and classic hits format, however, KEBE and KTLU were not simulcasting one another

On December 23, 2020, East Texas Results Media applied to relocate FM translator K280CL further north to Jacksonville, dropping two channels to 278 (103.5 MHz), and changing the translator's community of license to Jacksonville itself. Concurrently, Jacksonville licensed 104.7 K284CT, which repeats AM sister station 1400 KEBE, will move north out of Jacksonville and become a licensed Tyler station, under a separate proposal.

Effective March 30, 2021, East Texas Results Media sold KTLU, KEBE, and two translators to station operator Chisolm Trail Communications, LLC.

On July 16, 2022, KTLU dropped its simulcast with KOME-FM and went silent ahead of a pending sale.

Consumation of the sale from Chisholm Trail Communications LLC. to Richard Witkowski of North Texas Radio Group, L.P. was filed on January 10, 2023, the deal having closed on January 6, with a resumption of operations granted for KTLU and K280CL on January 17, 2023.

KTLU's license was surrendered, and canceled by the FCC on September 12, 2023.
