= KEBE =

Radio station in Jacksonville, Texas, United States

- Jacksonville, Texas; United States
- Frequency: 1400 kHz

Programming
- Language: English
- Format: Silent

Ownership
- Owner: Richard Witkowski; (North Texas Radio Group, L.P.)
- Sister stations: KEEI; KAMM; KDDM; KFON

History
- First air date: 1947
- Last air date: July 16, 2022
- Call sign meaning: Keeping Every Body Entertained (coined by original owner, William Dudley Waller)

Technical information
- Licensing authority: FCC
- Facility ID: 70741
- Class: C
- Power: 1,000 watts unlimited
- Transmitter coordinates: 31°58′11″N 95°15′52″W
- Translator: See § Translator

Links
- Public license information: Public file; LMS

KEBE (1400 AM) is a terrestrial American radio station, paired with two FCC authorized and licensed FM translators. The facility is licensed to Jacksonville, Texas, United States, and is owned by Richard Witkovski, through licensee North Texas Radio Group, L.P.

== History ==
AM 1400 KEBE Jacksonville, was licensed in 1946 to Bill A. Laurie of Jacksonville, Texas. KEBE was branded "The KEBE Corral", and was one of the first country stations in the United States. During the late 1940s and early 1950s, KEBE became the career starter for East Texas radio legend, Tom Perryman.

In 1957, Bill Laurie died in a fishing accident. Laurie's wife took over ownership briefly. Mrs. Laurie placed the station up for sale, and a TV Newscaster from El Dorado, Arkansas, Dudley Waller, put together the money to buy the station. Dudley and his wife Dorothy "Dot" Waller ran the station until 2014, when it was sold to Chuck Conrad's Chalk Hill Media.

KEBE was an affiliate of the ABC radio network, and at one time began running the Jones satellite network's "Classic Country" format. Some of KEBE's famous alumni include: Tom Perryman, Dudley Waller, Rick Watson, Jim Lord, and Al Mather.

KEBE's success led to the Wallers filing for an initial construction permit for an FM station for East Texas. KEBE-FM 106.5 signed on the air in the early 1970s. KEBE-FM became the first class C 100 kW FM Stereo station in East Texas. KEBE-FM was a beautiful music station that made the transition to easy listening/soft rock. In 1983, KEBE-FM changed to KOOI, with the moniker "Sunny 106.5 KOOI".

KEBE remained a full service country station until 2007, when a simulcast of sister station 103.1 KDVE/KMPA began. Since 2012, it has been simulcasting KZQX (former sister station 100.3), a big band and standards station based out of Chalk Hill, Texas. It has remained as a simulcast of KZQX through the latter years of Waller ownership, during Chalk Hill's ownership as owned and operated from 2014 to 2017, and now under the direction of North Texas Radio Group since.

On September 8, 2014, KEBE was sold to Chalk Hill Media, and thus continued the simulcast of KZQX. The sale of KEBE ended the 57 year ownership of KEBE by the Waller family.

On January 24, 2017, Charles Conrad's Chalk Hill Media filed for license reassignment, as an agreement had been made with the North Texas Radio Group to sell the original Jacksonville radio station for $50,000. North Texas Radio Group owned KMAD Madill, Oklahoma and KSOC Tipton, Oklahoma. Consummation of the sale was finalized on March 10, 2017, with KEBE remaining in a simulcast of KZQX Tatum under the new ownership.

On April 17, 2019, a license reassignment was granted by the FCC, that would transfer the licenses of KEBE and its FM translator to East Texas Results Media, LLC, headed by Mike Huckabee and Paul Coates. Upon consummation, KEBE became a sister station to KTLU in nearby Rusk. Consummation of the sale occurred on June 1, 2019.

East Texas Results Media closed the offices in Jacksonville, and took all six stations licensed to them silent as of July 1, 2019.

KZXM, KFRO-FM, KLJT, and KMPA have all since been sold to the Educational Radio Foundation of East Texas, owner and operator of Christian stations KVNE and KGLY. KEBE and KTLU remained silent, while awaiting sale of the facilities to new ownership. The facilities had until July 1, 2020 to return to broadcasting, or by law, the licenses for both would have been revoked, and the facilities deleted.

On June 18, 2020, KEBE and its related FM translator 104.7 K284CT returned to regular broadcasting. Both facilities received a grant to resume full operations on June 24, 2020. KEBE began simulcasting KOME-FM, a Classic Hits formatted radio station near Glen Rose, Texas.

On December 23, 2020, East Texas Results Media applied to move 104.7 K284CT to the northern edge of KEBE's coverage area, dropping one channel to 283 (104.5 MHz), and changing the translator's COL to Tyler.

Effective March 30, 2021, East Texas Results Media sold KEBE, KTLU, and two translators to KEBE's operator Chisolm Trail Communications, LLC.

On July 16, 2022, KEBE dropped its simulcast with KOME-FM and went silent ahead of a pending sale.

Consummation of the sale from Chisholm Trail Communications LLC. to Richard Witkowski of North Texas Radio Group, L.P. was filed on January 10, 2023, the deal having closed on January 6. KEBE AM and FM, as well as translator K284CT remain silent, under separate Special Temporary Authority filings granted by the Federal Communications Commission.

== Translators ==
Broadcast translators for KEBE
Call sign	Frequency	City of license	FID	ERP (W)	HAAT	Class	FCC info	Notes
K284CT	104.7 FM	Jacksonville, Texas	201161	250	51 m (167 ft)	D	LMS	First air date: February 21, 2018
K280CL	103.9 FM	Rusk, Texas	57214	250	54 m (177 ft)	D	LMS	First airdate: July 23, 1985 (in Palestine)
