= KTBB =

KTBB may refer to:

- KTBB (AM), a radio station (600 AM) licensed to serve Tyler, Texas, United States
- KTBB-FM, a radio station (97.5 FM) licensed to serve Troup, Texas
- KRWR, a radio station (92.1 FM) licensed to serve Tyler, Texas, which held the call sign KTBB-FM from 2009 to 2015
