= KVSE =

Radio station in Blanchard, Louisiana

Simulcasts KVNE Tyler, Texas
- Blanchard, Louisiana; United States
- Broadcast area: Shreveport–Bossier City metropolitan area
- Frequency: 89.1 MHz (HD Radio)
- Branding: 89.5 KVNE

Programming
- Language: English
- Format: Christian adult contemporary
- Subchannels: HD2: KGLY simulcast HD3: KZWL simulcast

Ownership
- Owner: Encouragement Media Group; (Educational Radio Foundation of East Texas, Inc.)
- Sister stations: KZWL; KLFZ; KELW; KHFZ; KVFZ; KGFZ; KVNE

History
- First air date: June 29, 2005 (as KOUZ)
- Former call signs: KOUZ (2005–2006); KFLO-FM (2006–2023)

Technical information
- Licensing authority: FCC
- Facility ID: 84100
- Class: C2
- ERP: 38,000 watts
- HAAT: 123.7 meters (406 ft)
- Transmitter coordinates: 32°18′28″N 93°58′34″W

Links
- Public license information: Public file; LMS
- Website: kvne.com

KVSE (89.1 FM, "89.5 KVNE") is an American radio station licensed to serve Blanchard, Louisiana. The station is owned by Encouragement Media Group. It airs a Christian adult contemporary music format.

Originally KOUZ, the station changed its call sign to KFLO-FM on March 31, 2006. Miracle 89.1 is simulcast on KFLO-FM (90.9 FM) in Minden. The station's HD2 subchannel broadcasts religious talk as "The Promise, Family Life Talk", which is rebroadcast by a translator at 90.7 FM in Shreveport.

Effective September 26, 2023, Family Life Educational Foundation sold KFLO-FM to Encouragement Media Group. The station simultaneously changed its call sign to KVSE.
