= KSYR =

KSYR may refer to:

- Syracuse Hancock International Airport (ICAO code KSYR)
- KVFZ, a radio station (92.1 FM) licensed to serve Benton, Louisiana, United States, which held the call sign KSYR from 2001 to 2023
