= KMAD =

KMAD may refer to:

- KMAD (AM), a radio station (1550 AM) licensed to Madill, Oklahoma, United States
- KCBN (FM), a radio station (102.5 FM) licensed to Whitesboro, Texas, United States, which used the call sign KMAD-FM from 1984 to 2026
