= Mack Mitchell =

American football player (born 1952)

No. 70, 72
- Position: Defensive end

Personal information
- Born: August 16, 1952 (age 74); Diboll, Texas, U.S.
- Listed height: 6 ft 8 in (2.03 m)
- Listed weight: 246 lb (112 kg)

Career information
- High school: Diboll
- College: Houston
- NFL draft: 1975: 1st round, 5th overall pick

Career history
- Cleveland Browns (1975–1978); Cincinnati Bengals (1979)

Awards and highlights
- PFWA All-Rookie Team (1975); First-team All-American (1974)

Career NFL statistics
- Sacks: 34
- Fumble recoveries: 5
- Safeties: 1
- Stats at Pro Football Reference

Mack Henry Mitchell (born August 16, 1952) is an American former professional football player who was a defensive end for five seasons in the National Football League (NFL), mainly for the Cleveland Browns.

He was born and raised in Diboll, Texas, and attended Diboll High School and the University of Houston. He was selected by the Cleveland Browns in the first round with the fifth overall pick in the 1975 NFL draft.
