= KWRW =

KWRW may refer to:

- KWRW-LD, a low-power television station (channel 34, virtual 33) licensed to serve Oklahoma City, Oklahoma, United States
- KTBB-FM, a radio station (97.5 FM) licensed to serve Troup, Texas, United States, which held the call sign KWRW until 2015
