= KFLO =

KFLO may refer to:

- The ICAO code for Florence Regional Airport in Florence, South Carolina, United States
- KFLO-FM, a radio station (90.9 FM) licensed to serve Minden, Louisiana, United States
- KFLO-LP, a low-power radio station (102.9 FM) licensed to serve Jonesboro, Arkansas, United States
- KVSE, a radio station (89.1 FM) licensed to serve Blanchard, Louisiana, which held the call sign KFLO-FM from 2006 to 2023
- KSYB, a radio station (1300 AM) licensed to serve Shreveport, Louisiana, which used the call sign KFLO until July 2002
