= KKML =

KKML may refer to:

- KFLO-FM, a radio station (90.9 FM) licensed to serve Minden, Louisiana, United States, which held the call sign KKML from 2013 to 2023
- KCSF, a radio station (1300 AM) licensed to serve Colorado Springs, Colorado, United States
