= KGFZ =

Radio station in Burke–Lufkin, Texas

- Burke, Texas; United States
- Broadcast area: Lufkin–Nacogdoches area
- Frequency: 97.7 MHz
- Branding: Fuzíon

Programming
- Language: Spanish
- Format: Christian contemporary hit radio

Ownership
- Owner: Encouragement Media Group; (Educational Radio Foundation of East Texas, Inc.)
- Sister stations: KVNE; KZWL; KLFZ; KHFZ; KELW; KGLY

History
- First air date: March 11, 2008 (as Class A 93.9 KBOG)
- Former call signs: KBOG (2008–2009); KAGZ (2009–2022)
- Call sign meaning: Fuzíon (branding)

Technical information
- Licensing authority: FCC
- Facility ID: 164167
- Class: C2
- ERP: 32,000 watts
- HAAT: 166.0 meters (544.6 ft))
- Transmitter coordinates: 31°21′38.80″N 94°38′55.40″W
- Repeaters: KLFZ Jacksonville; KHFZ Pittsburg; KVFZ Benton

Links
- Public license information: Public file; LMS
- Website: mifuzion.com

KGFZ (97.7 FM) is a terrestrial American radio station, broadcasting a Spanish language Christian based Contemporary Hit Radio music format, in full simulcast with co-owned KLFZ Jacksonville. Licensed to Burke, the station serves the Lufkin-Nacogdoches area. The license is held by the Educational Radio Foundation of East Texas, headquartered in Tyler, Texas.

== History ==
The station was assigned the call sign KBOG on February 19, 2008. On July 20, 2009, the station changed its call sign to KAGZ. KAGZ (first as "Z93.9", then as "Z97.7") was broadcasting a Classic Hip Hop and R&B, owned by E-String Wireless, prior to the sale of the facility to the ERFET.

On July 22, 2022, the station changed its call sign to KGFZ, reflecting the change in format, after beginning a simulcast of "Fuzíon" programming based in Tyler.
