= Bradley Prairie =

Coordinates: 31.2369°N 94.7319°W

Bradley Prairie is the name of a prairie in Southwest Angelina County, Texas, in the United States. It is located in the vicinity of the town of Burke, Texas.

Bradley Prairie was named for Tom Bradley, a native of San Augustine, Texas, who built a trading post there in 1835 to trade among the Muscogee (Creek people), Biloxi, Alabama (people), and Coushatta on the nearby Neches River and the Shawnee in the southeastern part of the county. All these tribes were emigrants from other parts of the country who occupied land formerly held by the Caddo, who had been wiped out three centuries earlier by smallpox borne by European explorers.

A branch of the Opelousas Cattle Trail connecting Opelousas, Louisiana and Crockett, Texas passed just south of Burke, and cattle ranching was the primary industry in the area in the middle 19th Century. However, after the American Civil War, Bradley Prairie's fertile soil attracted farmers mainly from the devastated Deep South. When the Houston, East and West Texas Railroad arrived and the town of Burke was founded in 1881 on the western edge of Bradley Prairie, the area became an important cotton raising area. With the founding of Lufkin, Texas and Diboll, Texas to serve the emerging lumber industry, Bradley Prairie and Burke declined in importance. In 1951 the Angelina County Airport was located at Burke in the midst of Bradley Prairie.

After Burke was founded, the name Bradley Prairie fell into disuse and is now largely forgotten.
