= WFOV-LP =

Flint, Michigan; United States
- Broadcast area: Flint, Michigan area
- Frequency: 92.1 MHz
- Branding: Our Voices Radio

Programming
- Format: Variety/Talk/Community

Ownership
- Owner: Flint Odyssey House
- Operator: Spectacle Productions

History
- First air date: May 23, 2016
- Call sign meaning: W Flint Our Voices

Technical information
- Licensing authority: FCC
- Facility ID: 194912
- Class: L1
- ERP: 100 watts
- HAAT: 108 feet (33 meters)
- Transmitter coordinates: 43°03′41″N 83°42′53″W

Links
- Public license information: LMS
- Website: WFOV Official Website

WFOV-LP, 92.1 FM, (branded "Our Voices Radio") is a low power radio station with a variety format licensed to Flint Odyssey House, Inc., a sober living facility in Flint, Michigan, and operated in association with Spectacle Productions. It features a mix of adult hits music, original and syndicated talk shows, and local public affairs programming including Flint City Council, Genesee County Commission, and Flint school board meetings. It calls itself a public access station, brokering time to local talent for a nominal fee, including former WKUF-LP personality Tom Sumner. It has a broadcast range of 10 miles (16 km) from its 69 feet (21 meters) high, 100 watt transmitter near Flint Fire Station #6 on West Pierson Road.
