= KEEI =

Radio station in Oakwood, Texas

- Oakwood, Texas; United States
- Broadcast area: Oakwood, Texas
- Frequency: 94.5 MHz

Programming
- Format: Deleted
- Affiliations: Texas State Network

Ownership
- Owner: Richard Witkowski; (North Texas Radio Group, L.P.)
- Sister stations: KAMM; KEBE; KDDM; KMAD

History
- First air date: October 10, 2018
- Former call signs: KETW (2018–2020); KDNT (2020–2023); KLUV (2023–2024)

Technical information
- Licensing authority: FCC
- Facility ID: 198814
- Class: A
- ERP: 100 watts
- HAAT: 63 feet (19.2 m)
- Transmitter coordinates: 31°35′4.23″N 95°51′4.63″W

Links
- Public license information: Public file; LMS

KEEI (94.5 FM) was a terrestrial American radio station, licensed to Oakwood, Texas, United States and owned by the North Texas Radio Group, L.P.

The station was programmed with a Top 40 (CHR)/Modern adult contemporary format, however, remained silent under authority of the Federal Communications Commission for most of its existence. The KEEI signal was extremely compact, and barely covered the small town of Oakwood, operating with a coverage area less than some L1 (low power FM) facilities.

== History ==
KEEI was initially proposed by Tomlinson-Leis Communications, L.P. through a short form application filed with the Federal Communications Commission and granted on November 6, 2015. The facility's transmission site was constructed near Broad Street in the small town of Oakwood, giving the community its first licensed aural service.

Tomlinson-Leis Communications sold the construction permit for the facility to North Texas Radio Group, L.P. on January 23, 2018.

The initial call sign KETW was granted on September 27, 2018. The facility is licensed to operate at an ERP of 100 watts, from an elevation of 63 feet (19.2 m) height above average terrain.

KETW signed on the air October 10, 2018, and received an initial License to Cover from the Federal Communications Commission on October 18, 2018.

North Texas Radio Group, LP was granted a call sign change to KDNT on March 3, 2020. Historically, the KDNT call sign was located on AM 1440 (now KEXB) in Denton, Texas from 1938 to 1994. The station requested to change the call sign to KLUV on July 13, 2023, and was granted the call sign the following day. This change, which took place on July 19, was disputed, as Educational Media Foundation originally applied to move the heritage vanity calls to an unbuilt FM station in Huron, South Dakota. On February 5, 2024, KLUV changed its call sign to KEEI. The license of KEEI was cancelled by the FCC on October 1, 2024.
