= KVFZ =

Radio station in Benton, Louisiana

- Benton, Louisiana; United States
- Broadcast area: Shreveport–Bossier City metropolitan area
- Frequency: 92.1 (MHz)
- Branding: Fuzíon

Programming
- Language: Spanish
- Format: Christian contemporary

Ownership
- Owner: Carol and Jetre Schuler; (6102 Seawall, LLC)
- Sister stations: KVSE

History
- Former call signs: KDKS (1980–1991); KLKL (1991–2001); KSYR (2001–2023)

Technical information
- Licensing authority: FCC
- Facility ID: 9681
- Class: A
- ERP: 6,000 watts
- HAAT: 98 meters
- Transmitter coordinates: 32.655°N 93.694°W
- Translator: 105.9 K290CW (Shreveport)
- Repeaters: KLFZ Jacksonville; KHFZ Pittsburg; KGFZ Burke

Links
- Public license information: Public file; LMS
- Website: mifuzion.com

KVFZ (92.1 FM) is a terrestrial American radio station, licensed to Benton, Louisiana and serving the Shreveport–Bossier City metropolitan area. The station airs Spanish language Contemporary Christian programming provided by the Encouragement Media Group.

== History ==
The station was formerly known as "The Buzz", created as an alternative rock addition to Shreveport, and competed mainly with local hard rock station, 99x.

The Buzz brought a refreshing new style of music to the area, featuring many bands that were not played on 99x or any other station. On Saturday nights, The Buzz was transformed into "Club Buzz," where all the songs played were techno-influenced remixes of the normal alternative songs that it played. The Buzz also featured a variety of interaction with listeners as well as original contests. Weekly contests featured were The Free Buzz at 4:20, Thumbs Up or the Finger, The Buzz Rewind, and the short lived Buzz Bits, where listeners could call in and say whatever they wanted, within reason. Its Too Cool for Tool contest was also original, with each contestant sitting on a large tub of ice, and whoever lasting the longest receiving a pair of Tool concert tickets, along with a "Tool"-box full of Tool SWAG.

The Buzz came to an abrupt end in 2004, in circumstances where it was literally there one minute and gone the next. No reason was ever stated for the cancellation of the station, and the format was quickly switched to Christmas music until the start of the new year. Since The Buzz, the station has been a light rock station and its current format is Spanish radio.

KSYR started 95.7, which now contains the oldies format that was on this frequency. On 95.7, it was first known as country. Then in approximately 1997, it flipped to Star 95.7, an Adult Contemporary station claimed to sit in between the CHR of 94.5 and soft rock of 96.5. It played hit music without the rap, sleepy music or hard rock trying to appeal to the core working audience. However, it flipped to a rhythmic top 40 as Power 95.7. The music selection mixed boy bands with the flourishing urban music scene putting it between KMJJ, KBTT and the more rock leaning top 40 at KRUF. Ultimately in 2001 it became the Buzz and moved to its present frequency.

Prior to being purchased by Coochie Brake Broadcasting LLC, the station was in simulcast with KOYE and KCUL-FM as Regional Mexican formatted "La Invasora".

Coochie Brake Broadcasting operated KSYR as Contemporary Christian "92.1 The Light", returning KSYR to English language programming. This would be a temporary switch, as effective September 26, 2023, Coochie Brake Broadcasting has sold KSYR to Carol and Jetre Schuler's 6102 Seawall, LLC. of Tyler, Texas. The same day, the facility changed its call sign to KVFZ. 92.1 has also changed programming to Tyler-based Encouragement Media Group's "Fuzion" Christian contemporary format, returning the frequency to Spanish language.

== Former on-air personalities ==
- Flynt Stone (currently on KTAL-FM)
- Johnny Maze
- Boner in the Morning (October 2001- September 2003)
- Drunk Mouth and Naked Jake (currently on KTUX)
- Bif Drysdale and Monkey Boy
- Rod the Human Tripod
