= KAMM (AM) =

Radio station in University Park, Texas

Coordinates: 32.836885°N 96.777401°W

- University Park, Texas; United States
- Broadcast area: Dallas–Fort Worth Metroplex
- Frequency: 1540 kHz

Programming
- Language: English
- Format: Alternative

Ownership
- Owner: Richard Witkovski; (North Texas Radio Group, L.P.)
- Sister stations: KEBE; KEEI; KMAD; KDDM; KFON

History
- First air date: 1949 (as KCUL)
- Former call signs: KCUL (1949–1967); KBUY (1967–1976); KRXV (1976–1978); KMZK (1978–1979); KTIA (1979–1983); KUQQ (1983–1985); KMIA (1985–1988); KSVZ (1988–1989); KSGB (1989–1993); KTNO (1993–1997); KPAD (1997); KZMP (1997–2023)

Technical information
- Licensing authority: FCC
- Facility ID: 63551
- Class: B
- Power: 32,000 watts (day); 750 watts (night), licensed; 100 watts (under current STA)

Links
- Public license information: Public file; LMS

KAMM (1540 kHz) is a commercial AM radio station licensed to University Park, Texas, serving the Dallas–Fort Worth Metroplex. It is owned by Richard Witkovski, through licensee North Texas Radio Group, L.P., and is operating at the reduced power of 100 watts under special temporary authority BSTA20230405AAC under authority of the Federal Communications Commission.

== History ==
The station signed on as KCUL in 1949, originally licensed to Fort Worth, Texas. KCUL was owned by East-West Broadcasting and featured a variety format through the 1950s. The station's call sign was chosen for investor A. B. Culbertson, although other sources mention a connection with Fort Worth-area optometrist L. H. Luck, because "K-C-U-L" was "luck" spelled backwards.

In the mid 1950s, KCUL switched to a country music format. Blocks of Spanish language programming were added in 1958 and the station became largely a Regional Mexican music outlet in the 1960s. By 1964, the radio station had picked up a sister station on the FM dial and hired Marcos Rodriguez, Sr. father of Marcos A. Rodriguez to be morning DJ and afternoon salesperson. At the time, FM radio in America was in its infancy. Listeners did not listen to FM very much and broadcasters were not sure the technology was going to last.

On New Year's Day, 1967, KCUL and KCUL-FM were sold by East-West Broadcasting to John Walton and was rebranded "Classical Country" KBUY, maintaining its country format with Western music added. It became the first full-time country/western station in the Dallas/Fort Worth area; the format adjustment was described as "an 'uptown' version of its predecessor, KCUL".

In 1976, the station again rebranded as KRXV (call sign derived from Roman numerals XV as "Radio 15"), with an all-news format that lasted for only 14 months. KRXV employed Marcos A. Rodriguez as a board operator and Jim Miklaszewski, later an NBC News correspondent, as news director. Hal Eisner, currently a longtime TV newsman in Los Angeles, also worked at KRXV. The format then changed to beautiful music as "Radio 15", a joint operation between actor Jimmy Stewart and Oklahoma News Network owner William Schuller. In 1978, the call sign was changed to KMZK, but the easy-listening format and branding remained the same.

Between 1979 and 1983, the station was revamped as KTIA with a Spanish format. KTIA was founded by a partnership led by Johnny Gonzalez, one of three former advertisers on KESS (107.1 FM), but their purchase coincided with the prime rate going to 20%. The business went bust and the station went dark for almost a year. The call sign KMIA was established on June 25, 1985, but the station didn't sign on until three months later. The format from that period until 1986 was Spanish, tropical, and Caribbean music. Then the format changed to urban contemporary gospel with some Spanish religious programming as "Faith 1540".

The station had Christian programming in the late 1980s and early 1980s under the call signs KSVZ (1988) and KSGB (1989) before flipping to Tejano music on February 1, 1993, as KTNO. Then in 1997, it was rebranded as KPAD with a Motivational format, airing syndicated programming from the Personal Achievement Radio service. The motivation format did not last long, and the call sign was changed to KZMP as a simulcast of KTCY until 2003. Along the way, KTCY and KZMP-FM swapped calls. In 2006, KZMP, along with three other stations, were sold by Entravision Communications to Liberman.

On June 1, 2009, KZMP struck a local marketing agreement (LMA) with The Walt Disney Company and dropped its FM simulcast ("Radio Salaam Namaste") replacing it with ESPN Deportes Radio.

Starting with the 2011 Major League Baseball season, KESN and KZMP acquired the rights to broadcast all Texas Rangers baseball games for the next four years. English broadcasts aired on KESN while the Spanish-language broadcasts were heard on KZMP. Additionally, the station also carried Spanish audio broadcasts for FC Dallas games.

It was announced on August 7, 2013, that Disney, the owner of ESPN Deportes Radio, had transferred the station's operations to Deportes Media. No changes in the station's programming lineup occurred.

ESPN Deportes 1540 logo before network's demise.

On September 4, 2016, ESPN Deportes Radio was dropped for a simulcast of sister station KZZA 106.7. KZZA's Classic Regional Mexican format was rebranded as "La Ranchera" the same day. The staff of ESPN Deportes Dallas announced on their Facebook pages that they were in search of a new station.

In July 2018, ESPN Deportes Radio returned to KZMP after an almost two-year absence. It competed with Univision Radio-owned 1270 KFLC, which broadcasts as a Univision Deportes Radio (now TUDN Radio) network affiliate.

On June 11, 2019, it was announced that ESPN Deportes Radio would cease operations on September 8, and relocate some of its programming to podcast delivery. The day of the network's shut down, KZMP returned to a simulcast of sister station KZZA's Classic Regional Mexican music. It rebranded as "La Ranchera 106.7 FM y 1540 AM."

On January 19, 2023, Estrella Media reached a deal to sell KZMP 1540 AM to North Texas Radio Group, owned by Richard Witkovski. The sale was consummated in May 10, and the station was taken silent, with a new format expected to be announced soon.

On June 22, 2023, the station changed its call sign to KAMM. The station has returned to the air, albeit at a much reduced power of 100 watts, from a temporary antenna located just west of University Park. Coverage area for KAMM has been significantly diminished, as a result, with the signal reaching a less than 10 mile radius. Efforts are currently ongoing to establish a new permanent broadcasting home for the KAMM array.
