= Diboll Independent School District =

School district in Texas, United States

Address
- 215 North Temple Boulevard ESC Region 7 Diboll, Texas; United States

District information
- Type: Public Independent school district
- Grades: EE through 12
- Superintendent: Vicki Thomas
- Schools: 6 (2011-12)
- NCES District ID: 4817040

Students and staff
- Students: 1,627 (2023–2024)
- Teachers: 132.00 (on an FTE basis) (2023–2024)
- Staff: 161.05 (on an FTE basis) (2023–2024)
- Student–teacher ratio: 12.33 (2023–2024)

Other information
- Website: www.dibollisd.com

Diboll Independent School District is a public school district based in Diboll, Texas (United States).

In addition to Diboll, the district also serves the city of Burke.

In 2009, the school district was rated "academically acceptable" by the Texas Education Agency.

== Schools ==
In the 2012–2013 school year, the district had students in six schools.

High schools

- Diboll High School (Grades 9-12)

Middle schools

- Diboll Junior High School (Grades 6-8)

Elementary schools

- H.G. Temple Intermediate School (Grades 4-5)
- H.G. Temple Elementary School (Grades K-3)
- Diboll Primary School (Grades EE-PK)

Alternative schools

- Stubblefield Learning Center (Grades 9-12)
