= Jermichael Finley =

American football player (born 1987)

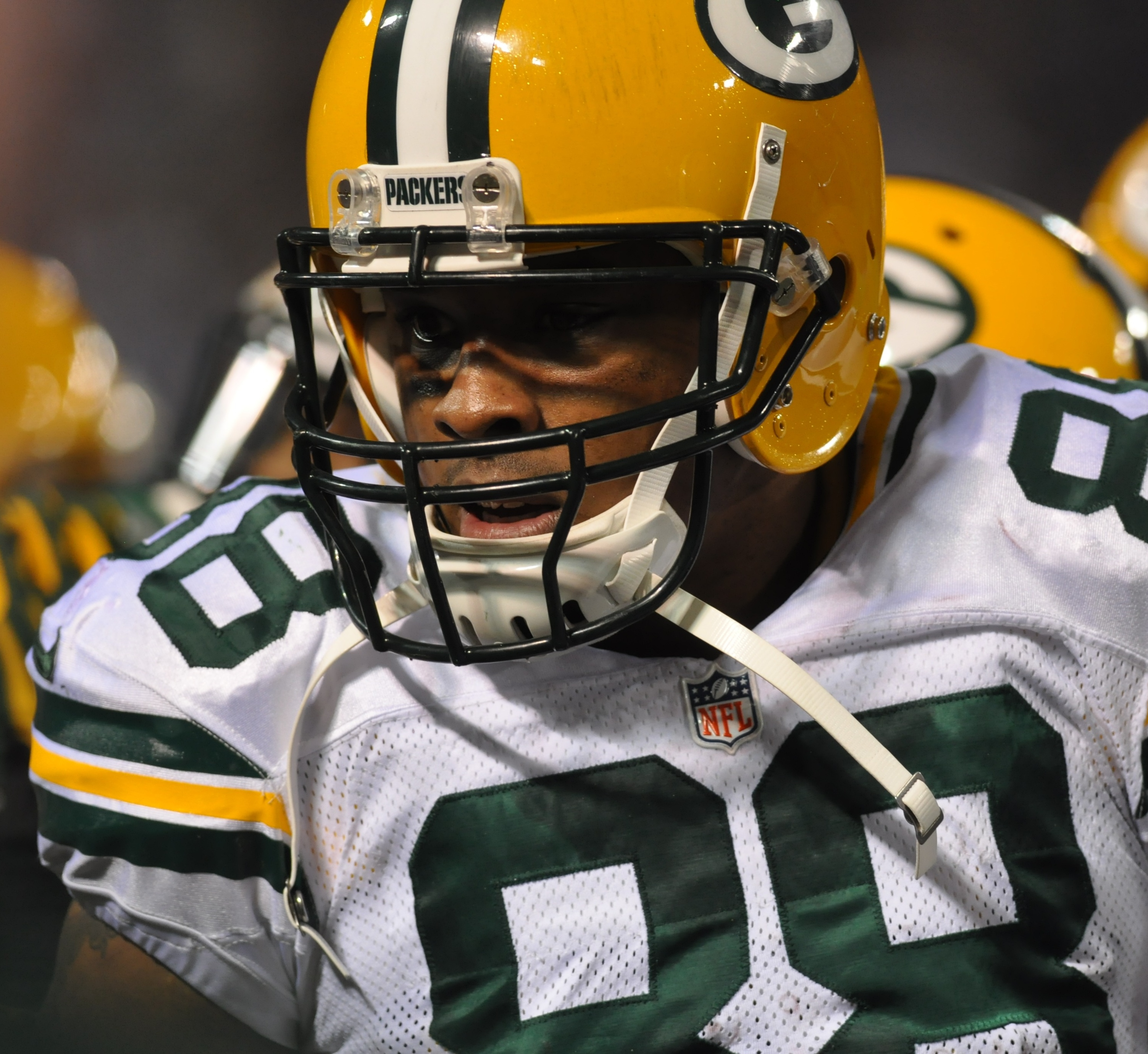
- Finley with the Green Bay Packers in 2012

No. 88
- Position: Tight end

Personal information
- Born: March 26, 1987 (age 39); Diboll, Texas, U.S.
- Listed height: 6 ft 5 in (1.96 m)
- Listed weight: 247 lb (112 kg)

Career information
- High school: Diboll
- College: Texas (2005–2007)
- NFL draft: 2008: 3rd round, 91st overall pick

Career history
- Green Bay Packers (2008–2013)

Awards and highlights
- Super Bowl champion (XLV); BCS National Champion (2005)

Career NFL statistics
- Receptions: 223
- Receiving yards: 2,785
- Receiving touchdowns: 20
- Stats at Pro Football Reference

Jermichael Decorean Finley (born March 26, 1987) is an American former professional football player who was a tight end in the National Football League (NFL). He was selected by the Green Bay Packers in the third round of the 2008 NFL draft. With the Packers, he won Super Bowl XLV win over the Pittsburgh Steelers, not participating due to injury. He played college football for the Texas Longhorns.

== Early life ==
Finley attended Diboll High School in Diboll, Texas where he not only started at tight end, but also played defensive end, wide receiver, safety, punter and kicker. As a high school senior he was named first-team 3A all-state by the Texas Sports Writer Association and second-team by the Associated Press. He was also named first-team all-district as a junior. Finley also holds a number of records at Diboll including 36 receptions for 878 yards. He also holds the record for receiving touchdowns with 13. In addition to football, he also played on the basketball team, where he was a district most valuable player, and ran track, where he was a member of the Diboll 4 × 200 metres relay (1:34.59), and a triple jumper (39 ft 10 in).

Coming out of high school, Finley was ranked as a four star prospect by Rivals.com. He stood at six feet four inches tall and weighed 210 pounds. He ran a forty-yard dash in 4.6 seconds.

Finley received scholarships from Texas, Arizona, Houston, Texas A&M, and Texas Tech.

== College career ==
Finley chose to play at Texas and received a redshirt during his freshman year in 2005.

As a redshirt freshman, he played in all 13 games and started four of them when the Longhorns came out in two tight-end sets. He caught passes in 10 games and broke the school freshman tight end record for receptions at 31 and had 371 yards and three touchdowns. At the end of the year, Finley was named an honorable mention Freshman All-American team.

Continuing on into his sophomore season, Finley started all 13 games at tight end. On October 6, 2007, Finley broke the school record for receiving yards by a tight end in a 28-21 loss against Oklahoma when he caught four passes for a career-high 149 yards. He finished the season with 45 receptions for 575 yards and two touchdowns. His performance earned honorable mention All-Big 12 Conference honors from the league's coaches and media.

On January 8, 2008, Finley announced he would forgo his junior and senior seasons of eligibility to enter the NFL by declaring himself eligible for the 2008 NFL draft. Longhorn head coach Mack Brown said "Finley finished his career ranked among the most productive receiving tight ends in school history and handled himself well both on and off the field during his time at Texas."

== Professional career ==
Pre-draft measurables
Height	Weight	Arm length	Hand span	40-yard dash	10-yard split	20-yard split	20-yard shuttle	Three-cone drill	Vertical jump	Broad jump	Bench press
6 ft 4 1/2 in (1.94 m)	243 lb (110 kg)	34 3/8 in (0.87 m)	9 1/4 in (0.23 m)	4.66 s	1.63 s	2.78 s	4.38 s	7.15 s	27.5 in (0.70 m)	9 ft 9 in (2.97 m)	20 reps
All values from NFL Combine/Pro Day

=== Green Bay Packers ===
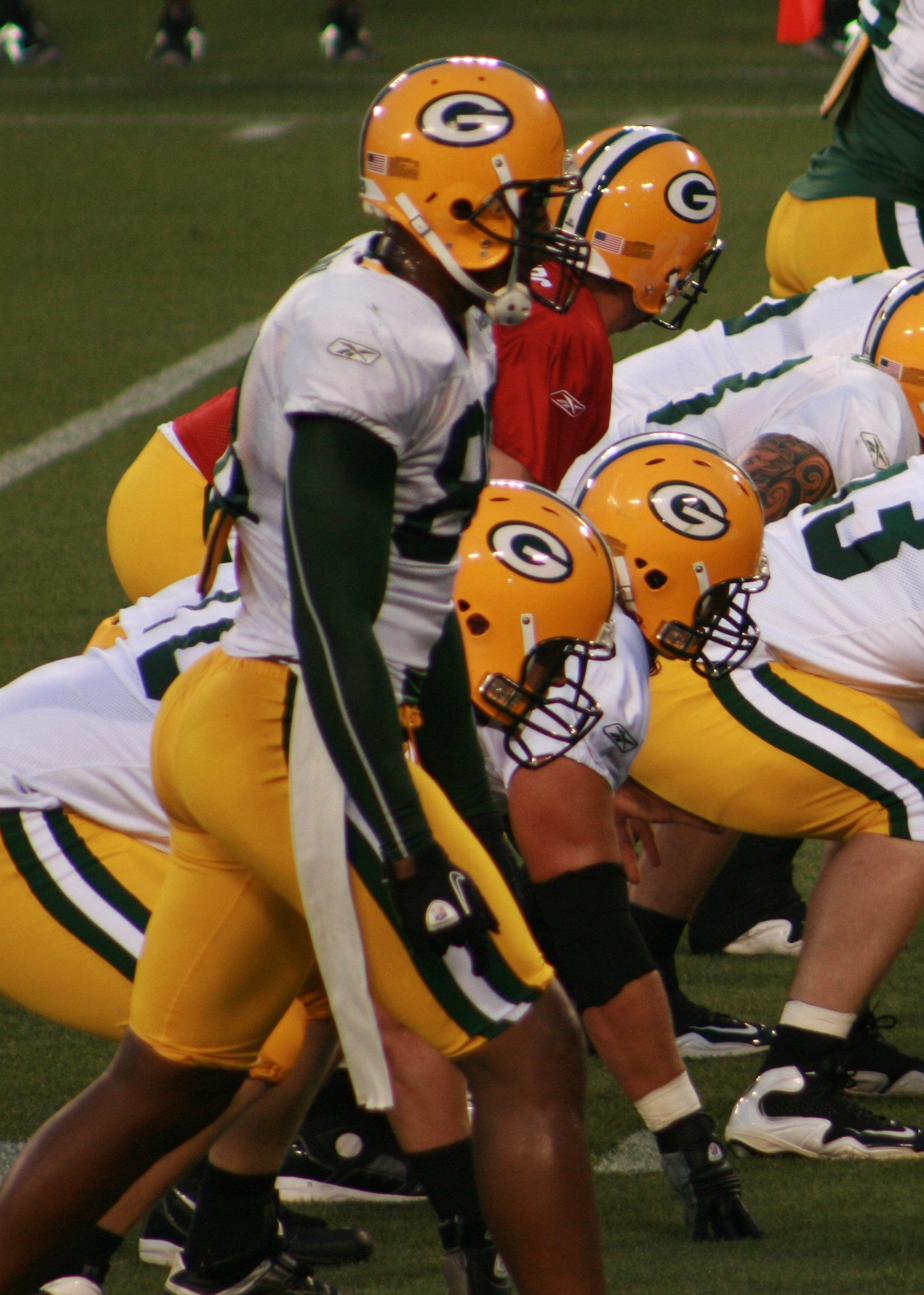
Jermichael Finley lined up.

Finley was selected by the Green Bay Packers in the third round of the 2008 NFL draft. He battled Tory Humphrey in training camp to be the Packers' No. 2 tight end. Finley eventually won the battle with incumbent veteran, Donald Lee, for the starting tight end position.

Finley had a breakout season in 2009, totaling his first 100-yard game in an October 5 matchup against the Minnesota Vikings while finishing the latter half of the season leading the team in targets. In the Wild Card round, Finley posted a franchise record in the playoff bout with the Arizona Cardinals, catching six passes for 159 yards (broken by Davante Adams in 2019).

After posting two 100-yard games in the first three games of 2010, Finley suffered a season-ending knee injury against the Washington Redskins. He was placed on injured reserve by the Packers on October 18.

Finley started the 2011 season off strong, catching three touchdowns in a Week 3 divisional match up against the Chicago Bears. Despite key drops late in the season, Finley still finished 3rd amongst tight ends in receiving touchdowns and 12th in terms of yards. After the 2011 season, Finley became a free agent. On February 22, 2012, the Green Bay Packers re-signed Finley to a 2-year $14 million contract. Finley was set to make a little over $5 million in 2012, and around $8 million in 2013. In week 7 of the 2013 season against the Browns, Finley suffered a bruised spinal cord after making a reception and colliding helmet to helmet with Cleveland Browns' safety Tashaun Gipson. He was immediately paralyzed and had minimal feeling in his legs and was taken to the ICU of a Green Bay hospital. Finley began regaining the ability to move his extremities the following day and was later diagnosed with a spinal cord contusion after the Green Bay Packers had examinations from specialists. After his spinal cord injury sustained in 2013, Finley became a free agent.

=== Free agency ===
Finley initially received interest from the Seattle Seahawks, New England Patriots and Pittsburgh Steelers, but no contract resulted. Finley cited a failed physical with the Seahawks as a reason for not receiving another contract. In October 2014, Finley filed a claim on his $10 million insurance policy. Despite working out five hours a day in Minneapolis and Wisconsin in hopes of an NFL comeback, Finley conceded that offers from the Steelers were not enough. "Pittsburgh have showed me a couple deals, but we all know the money ain't what it's supposed to be", Finley said in July 2014. "If I quit the game right now, I can take tax-free money, and that's a difficult thing that I'm going through with myself..."

On October 19, 2015, Finley announced his retirement from playing football, thanking the Packers' organization.

=== Regular season statistics ===
Year	Receiving
Year	G	Rec	Yds	TD	Avg
2008	14	6	82	1	12.3
2009	13	55	676	5	12.3
2010	5	22	301	1	14.3
2011	16	55	767	8	13.9
2012	16	61	667	2	10.9
2013	6	25	300	3	12.0
Total	70	223	2,785	20	12.5

=== Playoff statistics ===
Year	Receiving
Year	G	Rec	Yds	TD	Avg
2009	1	6	159	0	26.5
2011	1	4	37	0	9.3
2012	2	5	45	0	9.0
Total	4	15	241	0	16.1

== Personal life ==
Finley has five sons with his wife Courtney who all live in Aledo, Texas. In July 2025, his son Kaydon committed to Notre Dame as a wide receiver.

He is also the half brother of former Texas A&M running back Jorvorskie Lane. According to a November 2007 report, the two still continue to have a relationship with their father. They also played with each other growing up, and also were on the same AAU basketball team during their teen years. He is also a cousin to Rex Hadnot, a former Houston guard and sixth-round draft pick of the Miami Dolphins in 2004.

In a 2017 article for the Players' Tribune, Finley detailed the effects of sustaining multiple head and neck injuries in his football career and the recovery process from them.

In 2024, he received his Bachelor of Science from the University of Texas at Austin, 16 years after initially leaving college.
