= KKGT =

Radio station in Jacksonville, Texas

- Jacksonville, Texas; United States
- Broadcast area: Jacksonville; Whitehouse; Tyler
- Frequency: 95.1 MHz
- Branding: 95.1 Great FM

Programming
- Format: Adult hits

Ownership
- Owner: Jeffrey Jennings; (Storm Broadcasting, LLC.)

History
- First air date: October 31, 2018
- Former call signs: KEBE-FM (2018–2024)
- Call sign meaning: "Great"

Technical information
- Licensing authority: FCC
- Facility ID: 198813
- Class: A
- ERP: 2450 watts
- HAAT: 160.0 meters (524.9 ft)
- Transmitter coordinates: 31°58′11″N 95°15′52″W

Links
- Public license information: Public file; LMS
- Webcast: Listen live
- Website: www.greatfm.com

KKGT (95.1 MHz) is a radio station licensed to serve Jacksonville, Texas. KKGT is owned by Storm Broadcasting, LLC.

== History ==
KEBE-FM was initially proposed by Tomlinson-Leis Communications, L.P. through a short form application filed with the Federal Communications Commission and granted on November 17, 2015. The facility was proposed to be constructed on the KEBE tower in Jacksonville, which also provides a transmission site for the KEBE relay FM translator 104.7 K284CT.

KEBE-FM was granted the call sign on September 27, 2018. The KEBE call sign was randomly assigned to the AM sister station in 1947, but were later coined by original owner Dudley Waller to stand for "Keeping Every Body Entertained". The KEBE-FM call sign that this facility was first assigned once belonged to 106.5 KOOI, having been assigned to the facility in 1968, and continuing to use it until 1983.

The proposed facility was permitted to operate, once licensed, at an ERP of 200 watts, from an elevation of 86.9 meters height above average terrain. Tomlinson-Leis Communications sold the construction permit for the facility to North Texas Radio Group, L.P. on January 23, 2018.

KEBE-FM filed for a License to Cover the Class A FM facility on October 31, 2018.

On July 16, 2022, KEBE-FM went silent after the tower owner, Chisholm Trail Communications LLC, ceased electrical power at the site, as they prepared to sell the AM facility and tower to North Texas Radio Group. This will result in 1400 KEBE and 95.1 KEBE-FM becoming sister stations once again.

On January 8, 2024, the station changed its call sign to KKGT, after the announcement involving the purchase of KEBE-FM to Storm Broadcasting, LLC. was made.

On December 24, 2024, KKGT launched from the upgraded facility of 2,450 watts/160 meters with traditional Christmas music. On December 26, 2024, KKGT ended its Christmas music stint and launched an adult hits format, branded as "95.1 Great FM".
