= Diboll High School =

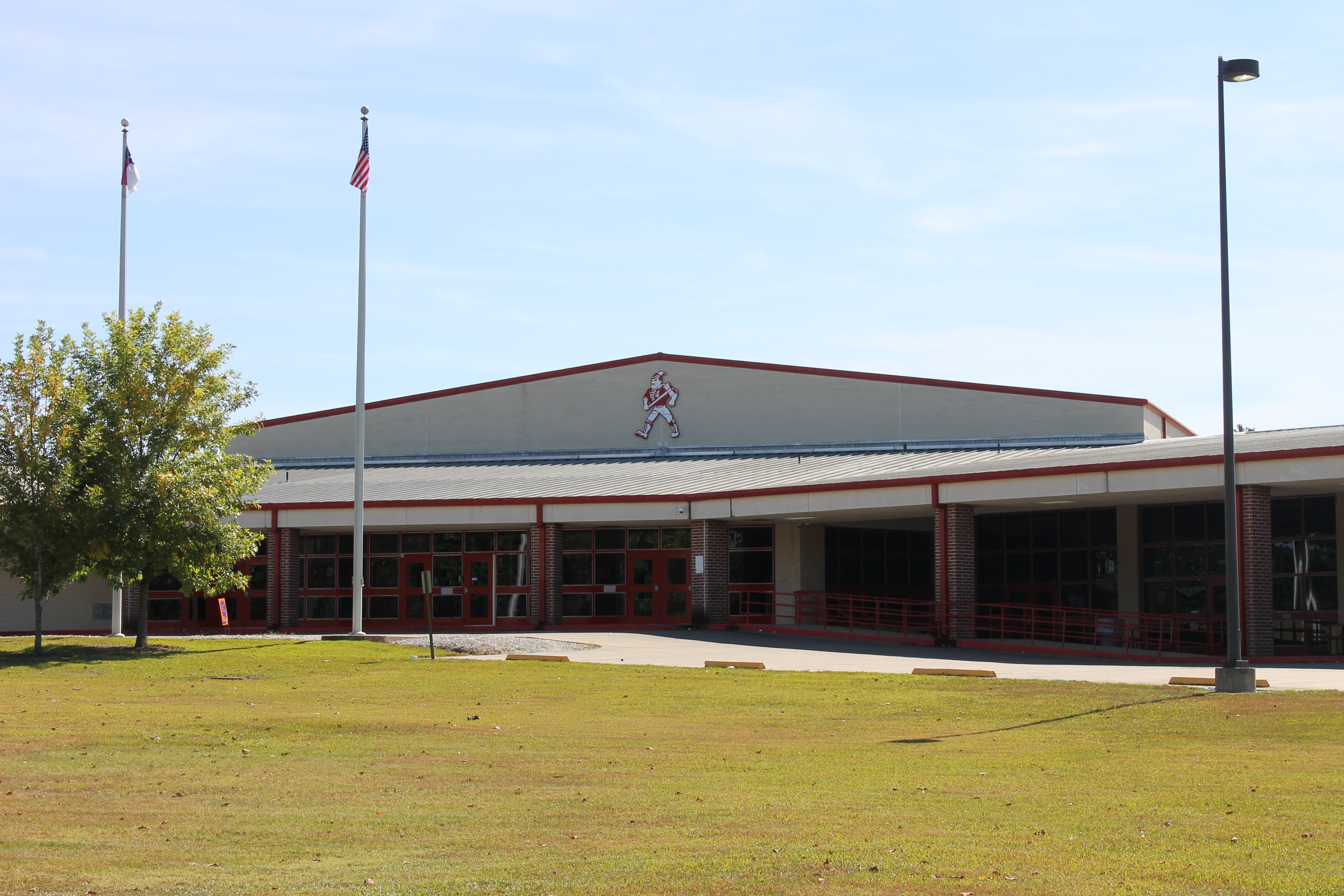

Location
- 1000 Lumberjack Drive; Diboll, Angelina County, Texas 75941-2102; United States; 31.1926°N 94.7683°W

Information
- School type: Public, high school
- Locale: Town: Remote
- School district: Diboll ISD
- NCES School ID: 481704001475
- Principal: Sheila Stephenson
- Faculty: 39.27 (on an FTE basis)
- Grades: 9–12
- Enrollment: 492 (2023–2024)
- Student to teacher ratio: 12.53
- Colors: White & Red
- Athletics conference: UIL Class 3A
- Mascot: Lumberjacks/Lady Jacks
- Website: Diboll High School

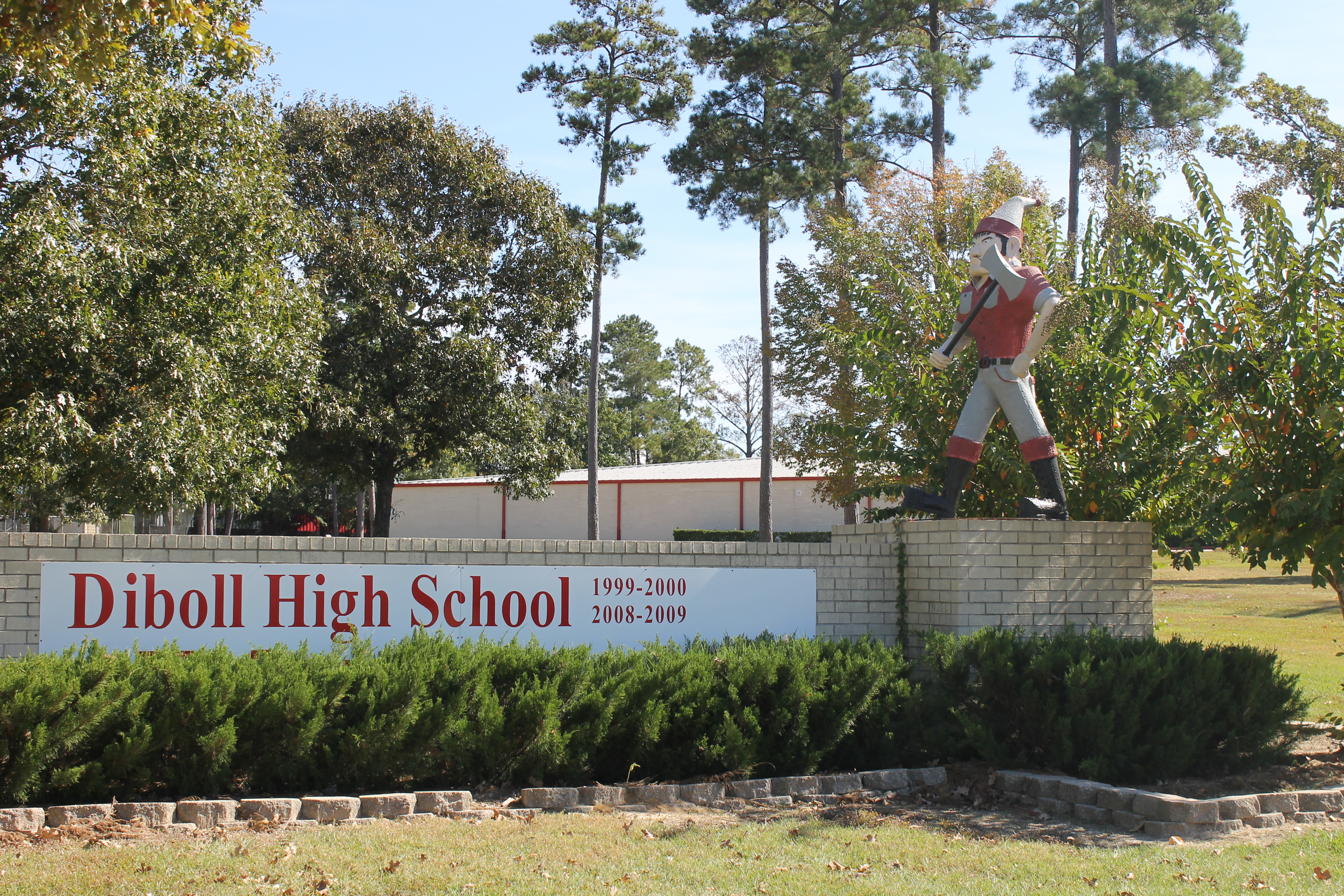
Diboll High School entrance sign

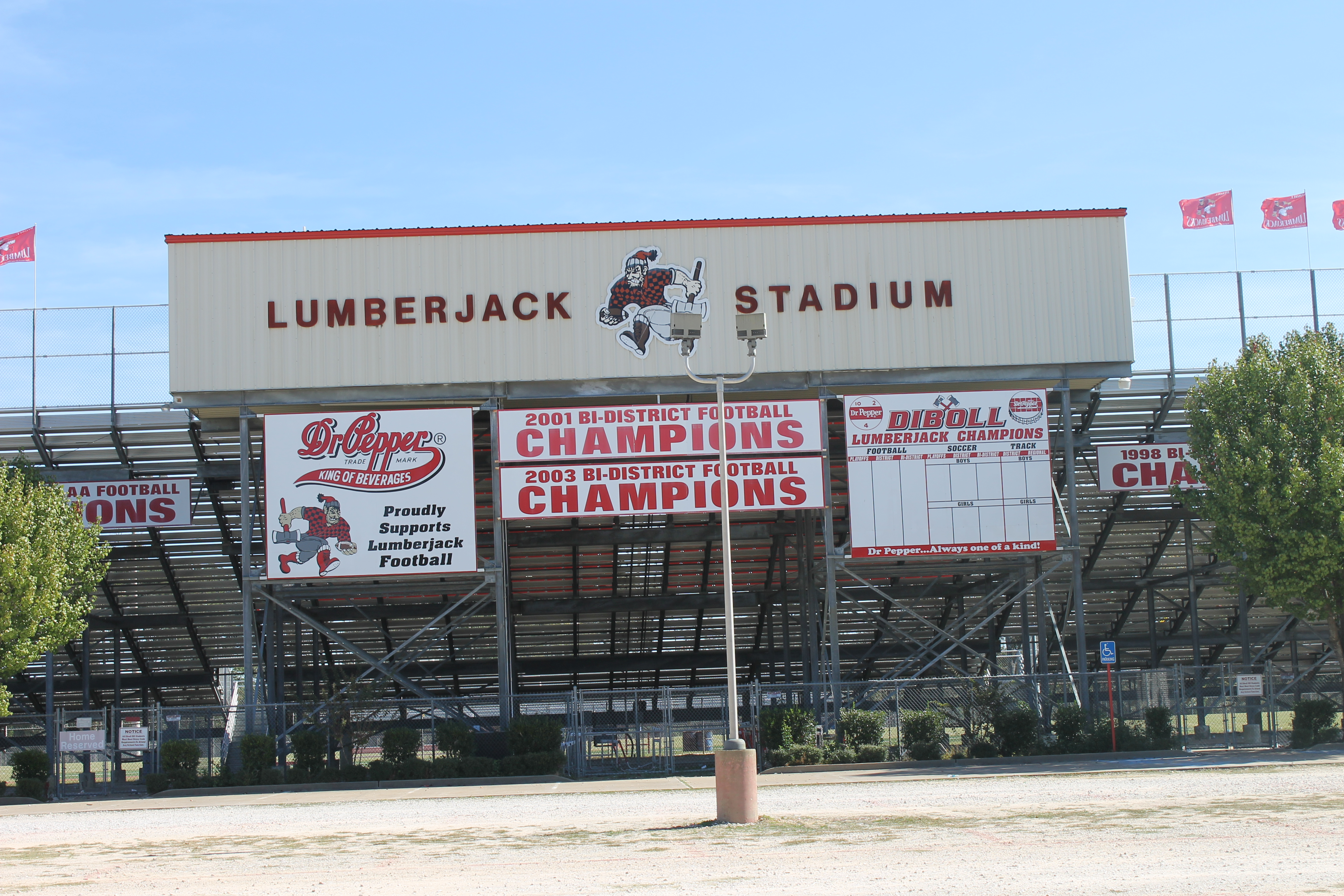
Lumberjack Stadium

Diboll High School is a public high school located in Diboll, Texas, USA and classified as a 3A school by the UIL. It is part of the Diboll Independent School District located in central Angelina County. During 2023–2024, Diboll High School had an enrollment of 492 students and a student to teacher ratio of 12.53. The school received an overall rating of "B" from the Texas Education Agency for the 2024–2025 school year.

== Athletics ==
The school mascot (appropriate for the town's major industry of forestry) is the lumberjack (lady jack for female teams).

The Diboll Lumberjacks compete in these sports -

- Baseball
- Basketball
- Cross Country
- Football
- Golf
- Powerlifting
- Soccer
- Softball
- Tennis
- Track and Field
- Volleyball

=== State titles ===
- Girls Track -
  - 1984(3A)

== Clubs and organizations ==
Diboll High School participates in the following activities -

- UIL Academics
- Academic Decathlon
- Debate
- Drug Free All-Stars
- FCCLA
- Future Farmers of America
- Gear Up
- Health Science
- Interact Club
- Mock Trial
- National Honor Society
- Smash Club
- Spanish Club
- Student Council

== Notable alumni ==
- Jermichael Finley - American football tight end for the NFL Green Bay Packers
