= KZWL =

Radio station in Bullard, Texas

Coordinates: 32°08′38″N 95°19′59″W

- Bullard, Texas; United States
- Broadcast area: Tyler metropolitan area
- Frequency: 94.3 MHz
- Branding: 94.3 The Well

Programming
- Language: English
- Format: Christian

Ownership
- Owner: Encouragement Media Group; (Educational Radio Foundation of East Texas, Inc.)
- Sister stations: KELW; KHFZ; KLFZ; KVNE; KGLY; KGFZ

History
- First air date: March 28, 2012
- Former call signs: KZXM (2010–2022)
- Call sign meaning: "Well" (station branding)

Technical information
- Licensing authority: FCC
- Facility ID: 170966
- Class: A
- ERP: 2,050 watts
- HAAT: 172.3 meters (565 ft)
- Repeater: 89.1 KVSE-HD3 (Blanchard, Louisiana)

Links
- Public license information: Public file; LMS
- Website: mywellradio.com

KZWL (94.3 FM) is a terrestrial radio station licensed to Bullard, Texas, United States, and serving the Tyler metropolitan area. The station is owned by Encouragement Media Group, and features a Christian preaching and education format, branded as 94.3 The Well.

== History ==
KZXM received a License to Cover on March 28, 2012, owned and operated by Dudley Waller. The new signal was utilized to simulcast Waller's "Kompa" Regional Mexican format from 103.1 KMPA from Pittsburg, bringing the format into the Tyler side of the combined Tyler-Longview market.

On August 1, 2016, KZXM and sister stations KMPA, KFRO-FM, and KLJT were taken off the air and the staff of both formats were let go and locked out by Susie Waller, the daughter of the deceased owner of the station, Dudley Waller.

On February 17, 2017, Waller Broadcasting filed for an extension of the Special Temporary Authority allowing KZXM and its three sisters to remain silent for an additional 180 days. The application also stated that a buyer had been found for the stations, and was expected to announce a deal to transfer the four stations' licenses, pending FCC approval, within the next 30 days.

On July 4, 2017, KZXM returned to the air after 11 months of silence, as "94.3 The Bull" airing a country music format featuring current & recurrent country artists. Its former simulcast companion, KMPA, returned accordingly, yet as the Regional Mexican format both stations had utilized prior to the shut down, renamed "Super 103.1".

On October 31, 2017, the license transfer from Waller Broadcasting to East Texas Results Media was granted for KZXM and its three sister stations, KFRO-FM, KMPA, and KLJT. The deal was consummated on March 8, 2018, at a purchase price of $1.2 million.

On September 26, 2018, KZXM changed their format from country to classic country, branded as "94.3 Real Country".

On June 10, 2019, East Texas Results Media filed to transfer the license of KZXM and its three sister stations to Encouragement Media Group, who in turn applied to turn all four facilities non-commercial. The Foundation broadcasts Christian programming.

"Real Country" left the air in mid-July 2019, pending transfer of the facility's license.

The sale of KZXM and its three sister stations was consummated on October 8, 2019, with ERFET officially taking control of the licenses and facilities.

Encouragement Media Group announced that they would launch a full service Christian preaching format on both KZXM and KFRO-FM, branded as The Well. The new format launched on April 20, 2020.

The station changed its call sign to KZWL on July 22, 2022.
