= KRWR =

Coordinates: 32°22′28″N 95°16′24″W

- Tyler, Texas; United States
- Broadcast area: Tyler-Longview metropolitan area
- Frequency: 92.1 MHz
- Branding: 92.1 The Team

Programming
- Format: Sports
- Affiliations: Fox Sports Radio; Westwood One Sports; Tyler Junior College; Texas Rangers

Ownership
- Owner: Paul Gleiser; (ATW Media, LLC)
- Sister stations: KTBB; KTBB-FM

History
- First air date: 1975
- Former call signs: KROZ (1975–1992); KGLD (1992–1993); KGLD-FM (1993); KDOK (1993–2009); KTBB-FM (2009–2015)

Technical information
- Licensing authority: FCC
- Facility ID: 24247
- Class: C3
- ERP: 9,600 watts
- HAAT: 135 meters (443 ft)

Links
- Public license information: Public file; LMS
- Webcast: Listen live
- Website: theteamfm.com

KRWR (92.1 FM, "The Team") is a commercial radio station licensed to Tyler, Texas, United States, and serving the Tyler-Longview market. Owned by Paul Gleiser through licensee ATW Media, LLC, it carries a sports format as an affiliate of Fox Sports Radio and Westwood One Sports, branded "The Team". Studios are located in One American Center at 909 ESE Loop 323, at the intersection with New Copeland Road. KRWR's transmitter is sited along N NE Loop 323 near Morningside Drive in Tyler.

== History ==
The station signed on the air in 1975 as KROZ, dubbed as "K-Rose." Over the years, it has aired country music ("Tyler Rose Country"), album rock and urban contemporary music formats (as "Z92.1" while keeping the KROZ call letters). Past personalities included Steve Cromer, Hoss Huggins, Dave Mitchell, Alex Price, Joel Hardy, Mike O'Neill, Bill Davis, Paul Berry, and Mick Fulgham.

KDOK logo used until April 2009

The station flipped to a 1950s/1960s oldies format and took the KGLD calls on February 9, 1992. On August 24, 1993, the station changed its call sign to KDOK.

On April 27, 2009, the oldies format was dropped as KDOK became the FM simulcast for sister station 600 KTBB's talk format. The call sign was changed to KTBB-FM to simplify identifications. On May 7, 2009, the KDOK calls and oldies format were moved to 1240 AM KBGE in Kilgore, Texas.

In early 2015, owner Paul Gleiser purchased the 97.5 facility from the Rusk Cherokeean Herald newspaper, and relocated the signal to its current Troup transmitter site, after over 30 years of service as KWRW in Rusk, Texas. On February 3, 2015, the news/talk format on KTBB-FM was moved to 97.5. That station became KTBB-FM, while 92.1 switched to the current call letters KRWR.

KRWR initially offered nationally syndicated ESPN sports programming, interspersed with local sports shows and events, branded as "ESPN 92.1 The Team FM".

In February 2017, KRWR switched its affiliation to Fox Sports Radio and CBS Sports Radio with the revised branding of "92.1 The Team". It also airs Tyler Junior College Apache sports, Monday Night Football, and is the East Texas home of the Texas Rangers.

== Previous logo ==
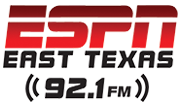
(KRWR's logo under previous ESPN Radio affiliation)
