= KELW =

Radio station in Gilmer–Longview, Texas

KGLY and KELW

KGLY: Tyler, Texas; KELW: Gilmer, Texas; United States
- Broadcast area: Tyler-Longview-Marshall
- Frequencies: KGLY: 91.3 MHz; KELW: 95.3 MHz
- Branding: Lift Worship

Programming
- Language(s): English
- Format: Contemporary worship music

Ownership
- Owner: Encouragement Media Group; (Educational Radio Foundation of East Texas, Inc.)
- Sister stations: KLFZ; KHFZ; KZWL; KVNE; KGLY; KGFZ

History
- First air date: KGLY: October 21, 1988; KELW: September 9, 1980
- Former call signs: KELW: KNIF (1980–1986); KAEZ (1986–1990); KLSQ (1990–1993); KFRO-FM (1993–1998); KCGL (1998–1999); KFRO-FM (1999–2022); KWLL (2022–2025)
- Call sign meaning: KELW: Lift Worship

Technical information
- Licensing authority: FCC
- Facility ID: KGLY: 18757; KELW: 14755
- Class: KGLY: C2; KELW: C3
- ERP: KGLY: 12,000 watts; KELW: 5,900 watts
- HAAT: KGLY: 155 meters (509 ft); KELW: 203 meters (666 ft)
- Transmitter coordinates: KGLY: 32°17′33.5″N 95°12′2.8″W; KELW: 32°37′50″N 94°53′44″W
- Repeater(s): 89.1 KVSE-HD2 (Blanchard, Louisiana)

Links
- Public license information: KGLY: Public file; LMS; KELW: Public file; LMS
- Website: myliftworship.com

KELW (95.3 FM) and KGLY (91.3 FM) are a pair of terrestrial American radio stations, licensed to Gilmer and Tyler, Texas, United States, respectively, and broadcasting in a simulcast Contemporary worship music format as "Lift Worship". The stations serve the Tyler-Longview-Marshall area, and are owned by Encouragement Media Group.

Studio location for both stations are at 7695 Old Jacksonville Highway in southwest Tyler.

== History ==
The station went on the air as KNIF on September 9, 1980, as "Nifty" 95 and was originally owned by Jack Daniels. It was sold to Rick Reynolds, changed calls to KAEZ on December 5, 1986, and became an Easy Listening station.

On September 17, 1990, the station changed its call sign to KLSQ, being changed to an adult contemporary station as "Q-95." In 1993, the station switched to oldies as a simulcast of KFRO and taking the KFRO-FM calls in the process, after being sold to J.R. Curtis Jr., son of longtime KFRO (AM) owner James R. Curtis Sr. KFRO-FM remained an oldies station, in its first run, for 10 years, even taking the format exclusively from the AM sister station as 1370 moved to sports programming.

In 1998, KFRO-FM relaunched its oldies format with a simulcast on KPXI 100.7, which had just been downgraded and moved from Mt. Pleasant to Overton. It also briefly changed calls to KCGL during this period, but was quickly aborted and returned to KFRO-FM on February 15, 1999.

In 2001, KFRO-FM, having dropped the simulcast with KPXI, reimaged as "95.3 The Frog."

In October 2003, KFRO-FM dropped the oldies format and moved into a simulcast of Regional Mexican KOYE 96.7, "K-Oye." At this time, both the stations reimaged as "La Super Invasora." This simulcast lasted only six months, with the oldies format and "The Frog" branding returning to 95.3 afterwards.

In Spring 2005, after being purchased by Dudley Waller's Waller Media, KFRO-FM switched to a simulcast of new sister station KLJT 102.3, launching a soft adult contemporary format as "95.3 & 102.3 The Breeze."

By 2007, "The Breeze" had evolved into a hot AC format. In June 2008, "The Breeze" was relaunched again as a Top 40/CHR station, marking the return of a Top 40 format to the Tyler-Longview dial ince KISX switched to urban AC in the year prior.

On August 1, 2016, KFRO-FM and sister stations KLJT, KMPA, and KZXM were taken off the air and the staff of those stations were let go and locked out without warning by Susie Waller, the daughter of the deceased owner of the station, Dudley Waller. The website remained active through mid-August, but it was redirected to a "WordPress For Broadcasters" page due to the aforementioned lockout of staff, plus it could no longer stream any live broadcasts. The staff for "The Morning Madhouse" show apologized and thanked their listeners as well as explaining the incident in detail on the show's Facebook page.

On February 17, 2017, Waller Broadcasting filed for an extension of the Special Temporary Authority allowing KFRO-FM and its three sisters to remain silent for an additional 180 days. The application also stated that a buyer had been found for the station, and was expected to announce a deal to transfer the four stations licenses, pending F.C.C. approval, within the next 30 days.

On July 3, 2017, KFRO-FM returned to the air (simulcasted by KLJT) as "Fun Radio 102.3 & 95.3", rebirthing the former CHR/Top 40 format it had as "The Breeze".

On October 31, 2017, the license transfer from Waller Broadcasting to East Texas Results Media was granted for KFRO-FM and its three sister stations, KZXM, KMPA, and KLJT. The deal was consummated on March 8, 2018, at a purchase price of $1.2 million.

On June 10, 2019, East Texas Results Media filed to transfer the license of KFRO-FM and its three sister stations to Encouragement Media Group, who in turn has applied to turn all four facilities non-commercial. The Foundation broadcasts Christian programming.

"Fun 95.3 & 102.3" left the air in mid-July 2019, pending transfer of the licenses.

The sale of KFRO-FM and its three sister stations was consummated on October 8, 2019, with ERFET officially taking control of the licenses and facilities. ERFET has announced that KFRO-FM will no longer simulcast KLJT once it returns to the air, breaking the simulcast that had been in place for over a decade.

Encouragement Media Group announced that they would launch a full service Christian teaching format on both KFRO-FM and KZXM, branded as "The Well". The new format launched on April 20, 2020.

On July 22, 2022, the station changed its call sign to KWLL.

The Well format was moved exclusively to 94.3 KZWL on April 4, 2025. Concurrently, 95.3 now becomes a simulcast of "Lift Worship" 91.3 KGLY in Tyler, significantly increasing the footprint of Encouragement Media's Contemporary Worship format over the Tyler-Longview area. With the change, Encouragement Media requested and was granted a new call sign to the current KELW. 91.3 KGLY becomes this facility's third different simulcast partner with a signal originating from the Jacksonville-Tyler side of the market, and returns a music format to 95.3 after 5 years of broadcasting spoken word.
