= KTBB (AM) =

Simulcasts with KTBB-FM, Troup, TX
- Tyler, Texas; United States
- Broadcast area: Tyler-Longview metropolitan area
- Frequency: 600 kHz
- Branding: KTBB 97.5 FM

Programming
- Format: Talk radio
- Affiliations: Fox News Radio; Compass Media Networks; Premiere Networks; Westwood One

Ownership
- Owner: Paul Gleiser; (ATW Media, LLC)
- Sister stations: KRWR, KTBB-FM

History
- First air date: August 28, 1947
- Call sign meaning: Thomas Booker Butler Publishing Company (original owner)

Technical information
- Licensing authority: FCC
- Facility ID: 24248
- Class: B
- Power: 5,000 watts (day); 2,500 watts (night)
- Transmitter coordinates: 32°16′18″N 95°12′23″W
- Repeater: 97.5 KTBB-FM (Troup)

Links
- Public license information: Public file; LMS
- Webcast: Listen live
- Website: ktbb.com

KTBB (600 AM) is a commercial radio station licensed to Tyler, Texas, United States, serving the Tyler-Longview market as a simulcast of talk-formatted KTBB-FM. The stations are owned by Paul Gleiser, through licensee ATW Media, LLC. KTBB's studios are located in Tyler, while the transmitter is sited in Whitehouse.

== History ==
KTBB signed on the air on August 28, 1947. It was owned and operated by the Blackstone Broadcasting Company. The call sign includes the initials for Tyler and Blackstone Broadcasting. KTBB originally broadcast with 500 watts.

By the 1960s, the power had increased to 1,000 watts. It was owned by Family Stations. KTBB's format was middle of the road music, plus news and sports. In the late 1970s and 80s, KTBB stepped up the music tempo to become a full service, adult contemporary station. It was an affiliate of the ABC Information Network.

By the late 1980s, the music was eliminated and the station was all-talk and news. The power increased to 5,000 watts days and 2,500 watts nights.

== Programming ==
KTBB and KTBB-FM carry local news blocks in mornings and afternoons; the remainder of the weekday schedule is syndicated conservative talk shows.
