= KVNE =

Christian radio station in Tyler, Texas

- Tyler, Texas; United States
- Broadcast area: Tyler-Longview area
- Frequency: 89.5 MHz
- Branding: 89.5 KVNE

Programming
- Language: English
- Format: Christian adult contemporary

Ownership
- Owner: Encouragement Media Group; (Educational Radio Foundation of East Texas, Inc.)
- Sister stations: KZWL; KLFZ; KELW; KHFZ

History
- First air date: September 29, 1983
- Call sign meaning: Vine (former branding)

Technical information
- Licensing authority: FCC
- Facility ID: 18758
- Class: C1
- ERP: 96,000 watts
- HAAT: 278 meters (912 ft)
- Transmitter coordinates: 32°32′21.00″N 95°13′16.00″W
- Repeaters: 89.1 KVSE (Blanchard, Louisiana); 93.3 KVNB (Bryant, Arkansas)

Links
- Public license information: Public file; LMS
- Website: kvne.com

KVNE (89.5 FM) is a radio station licensed to Tyler, Texas, United States, owned by Encouragement Media Group, and serving the Tyler-Longview market with a Christian adult contemporary format.

Studio location for the station is at 7695 Old Jacksonville Highway in southwest Tyler.

== Translators ==
In addition to the main station, KVNE was once relayed to an additional 2 translators, in order to widen its broadcast area. 99.1 K256AT in Nacogdoches was later sold and moved out of the area, while 104.3 K282AM is now used to rebroadcast KIMP in Mt. Pleasant. KVNE was also previously heard on co-owned translator K214BE licensed to Shreveport, Louisiana, which has also since been sold.
