= KLFZ =

Radio station in Jacksonville–Tyler–Longview, Texas

- Jacksonville, Texas; United States
- Broadcast area: Tyler, Texas
- Frequency: 102.3 MHz
- Branding: Fuzíon

Programming
- Language: Spanish
- Format: Christian

Ownership
- Owner: Encouragement Media Group; (Educational Radio Foundation of East Texas, Inc.)
- Sister stations: KVNE; KZWL; KELW; KHFZ; KGFZ; KVFZ

History
- First air date: December 30, 1993 (as Class A KSIZ)
- Former call signs: KSIZ (1991–1998); KLJT (1998–2022)
- Call sign meaning: "Fuzíon" (branding)

Technical information
- Licensing authority: FCC
- Facility ID: 57204
- Class: C2
- ERP: 50,000 watts
- HAAT: 150 meters (490 ft)
- Repeaters: KHFZ Pittsburg; KVFZ Benton; KGFZ Burke

Links
- Public license information: Public file; LMS
- Website: mifuzion.com

KLFZ (102.3 FM) is a terrestrial American radio station, owned by Encouragement Media Group, and serving as the flagship of the Fuzíon Radio network of Spanish language Christian stations across east Texas and northwest Louisiana. Licensed to Jacksonville, Texas, United States, KLFZ serves the Tyler metropolitan area and simulcasts programming with its sister stations 103.1 KHFZ Pittsburg serving the Longview area, 97.7 KGFZ Burke, serving Lufkin-Nacogdoches and the Piney Woods of Deep East Texas, and KVFZ Benton, Louisiana, serving Shreveport-Bossier City.

== History ==
The station was assigned call sign KSIZ on February 22, 1991. On January 20, 1998, the station changed its call sign to KLJT. In 2008, the station flipped to a Top 40 (CHR) format with programming from the Hits Now! network while retaining "The Breeze" moniker.

On August 1, 2016, KLJT and sister stations KFRO-FM, KMPA, and KZXM were taken off the air and the staff of those stations were let go and locked out without warning by Susie Waller, the daughter of the deceased owner of the station, Dudley Waller. The website remained active through mid-August, but it was redirected to a "WordPress For Broadcasters" page due to the aforementioned lockout of staff, plus it could no longer stream any live broadcasts. The staff for "The Morning Madhouse" show apologized and thanked their listeners as well as explaining the incident in detail on the show's Facebook page.

On February 17, 2017, Waller Broadcasting filed for an extension of the Special Temporary Authority allowing KLJT and its three sisters to remain silent for an additional 180 days. The application also stated that a buyer had been found for the stations, and was expected to announce a deal to transfer the four stations' licenses, pending F.C.C. approval, within the next 30 days.

On July 3, 2017, East Texas Results Group (operated by Paul Coates and Mike Huckabee) began its temporary lease of KLJT & KFRO-FM from Dorothy Waller, and relaunched the CHR format as Fun Radio after being absent from the airwaves for almost a year.

On October 31, 2017, the license transfer was granted by the Federal Communications Commission for KLJT and its three sister stations, KFRO-FM, KMPA, and KZXM. The deal was consummated on March 8, 2018, at a purchase price of $1.2 million.

On June 10, 2019, East Texas Results Media filed to transfer the license of KLJT and its three sister stations to Encouragement Media Group, who in turn applied to turn all four facilities non-commercial. The Foundation broadcasts Christian programming.

KLJT featured a Top 40 playlist branded as Fun! 95.3/102.3 prior to the sale of the facility to Encouragement Media Group, simulcasted on sister station 95.3 KFRO-FM Gilmer. The station broadcast in HD radio until it went silent in July 2019.

"Fun 95.3 & 102.3" left the air in mid-July 2019, pending transfer of the facility's license.

The sale of KLJT and its three sister stations was consummated on October 8, 2019, with ERFET officially taking control of the licenses and facilities.

Encouragement Media Group announced that they would launch a full service Spanish language Christian format on both KLJT and KMPA. The new format launched in January 2020, as announced in late October 2019.

The station changed its call sign to KLFZ on July 22, 2022.
