= KTBB-FM =

- Troup, Texas; United States
- Broadcast area: Tyler–Longview
- Frequency: 97.5 MHz
- Branding: KTBB 97.5 FM

Programming
- Format: Talk radio
- Affiliations: Fox News Radio

Ownership
- Owner: Paul Gleiser; (ATW Media, LLC)
- Sister stations: KRWR; KTBB

History
- First air date: July 1, 1981
- Former call signs: KWRW (1981–2015)
- Former frequencies: 97.7 MHz (1981–2015)
- Call sign meaning: Taken from KTBB (AM)

Technical information
- Licensing authority: FCC
- Facility ID: 17835
- Class: C3
- ERP: 13,000 watts
- HAAT: 121 meters (397 ft)
- Transmitter coordinates: 32°20′14.00″N 95°02′41.00″W
- Repeater: 600 KTBB (Tyler)

Links
- Public license information: Public file; LMS
- Webcast: Listen live
- Website: ktbb.com

KTBB-FM (97.5 FM) is a commercial radio station licensed to Troup, Texas, United States, serving the Tyler-Longview market. It simulcasts a talk format with its sister station KTBB (600 AM). The stations are owned by Paul Gleiser, through licensee ATW Media, LLC.

Studios for KTBB-AM-FM are located in the Woodgate Centre office building at 1001 ESE Loop 323. The FM transmitter is on County Road 246 South in Tyler, Texas.

== History ==
The station signed on the air on July 1, 1981, as KWRW, licensed to Rusk, Texas. At first, the station broadcast at 97.7 MHz and was owned by Texas State Representative Emmett Holman Whitehead. KWRW mostly simulcast its sister station, KTLU 1580 AM. They featured a full-service format with adult contemporary music, specialty shows, sports and news during the first six years of operation.

Because KTLU 1580 was a daytimer, KWRW was able to broadcast into the night when KTLU was off the air. The call letters, KWRW, were chosen by Representative and Mrs. Whitehead in honor of their daughter, Dr. Wendee R. Whitehead. KWRW was powered at 3,000 watts, transmitting from the KTLU tower in Rusk. In order to extend KWRW's signal beyond Cherokee County, Whitehead applied for and was granted an FM translator at 103.9 FM, licensed as K280CL Palestine, in 1985.

On January 15, 2009, KWRW changed formats from oldies to classic hits and rebranded as "Classic Hits 97.7".

KWRW and K280CL remained together for almost 20 years until Whitehead's death. That prompted the transfer of KWRW, the relay translator, and AM sister station KTLU to The Cherokeean Herald newspaper.

KWRW was purchased by Paul Gleiser in March 2015. As part of the purchase, a request to move the KWRW facility from Rusk to Troup was applied for and granted by the Federal Communications Commission. The current 97.5 Troup facility began broadcasting as KTBB-FM on May 15, 2015. K280CL subsequently moved from Palestine to Rusk and became the translator for KTLU 1580 AM.

== Programming ==
On weekdays, KTBB-AM-FM features two hours of news in the morning and an hour of news and information in afternoon drive time. The remainder of the weekday schedule is syndicated conservative talk shows.
