= Diboll, Texas =

- Town
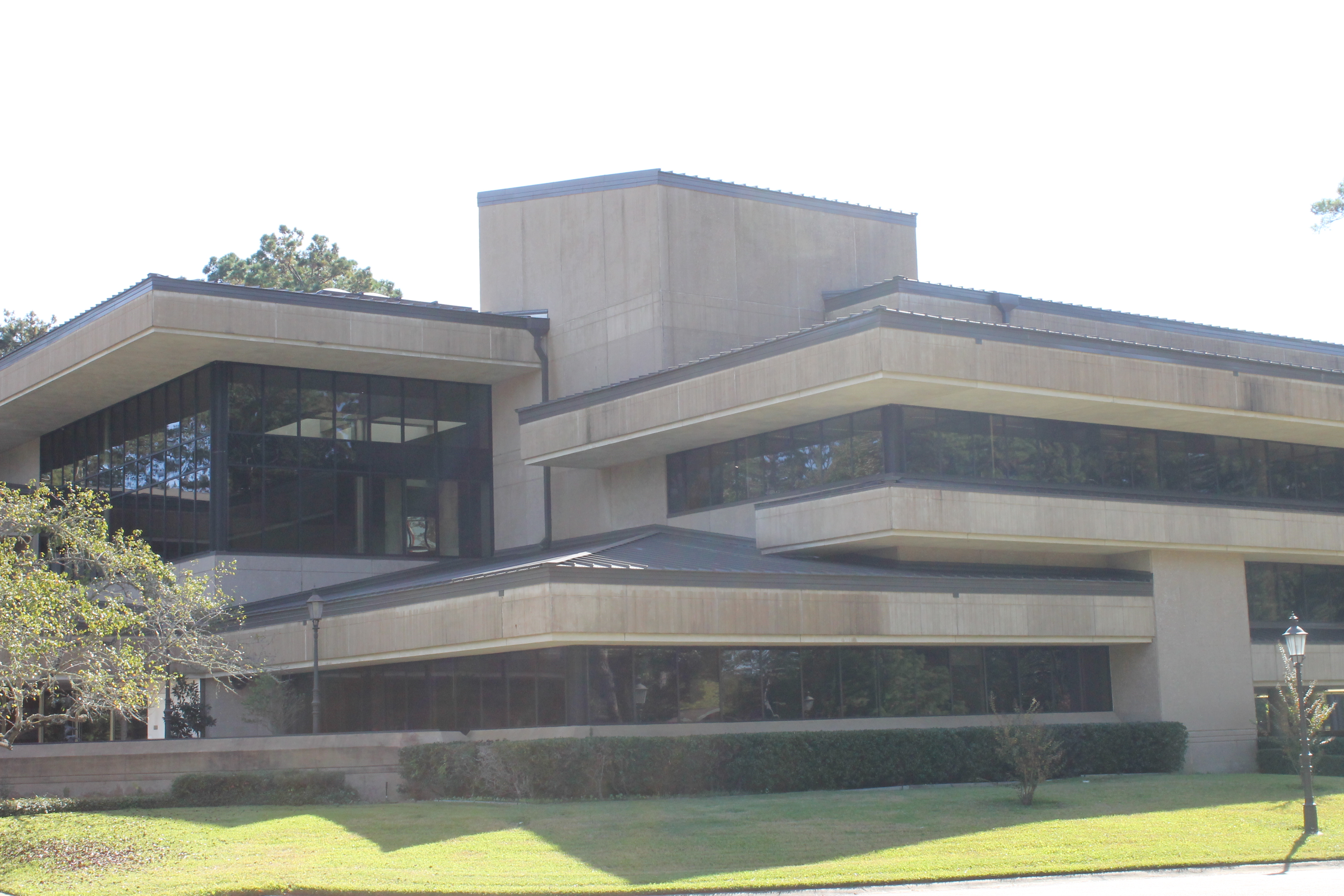
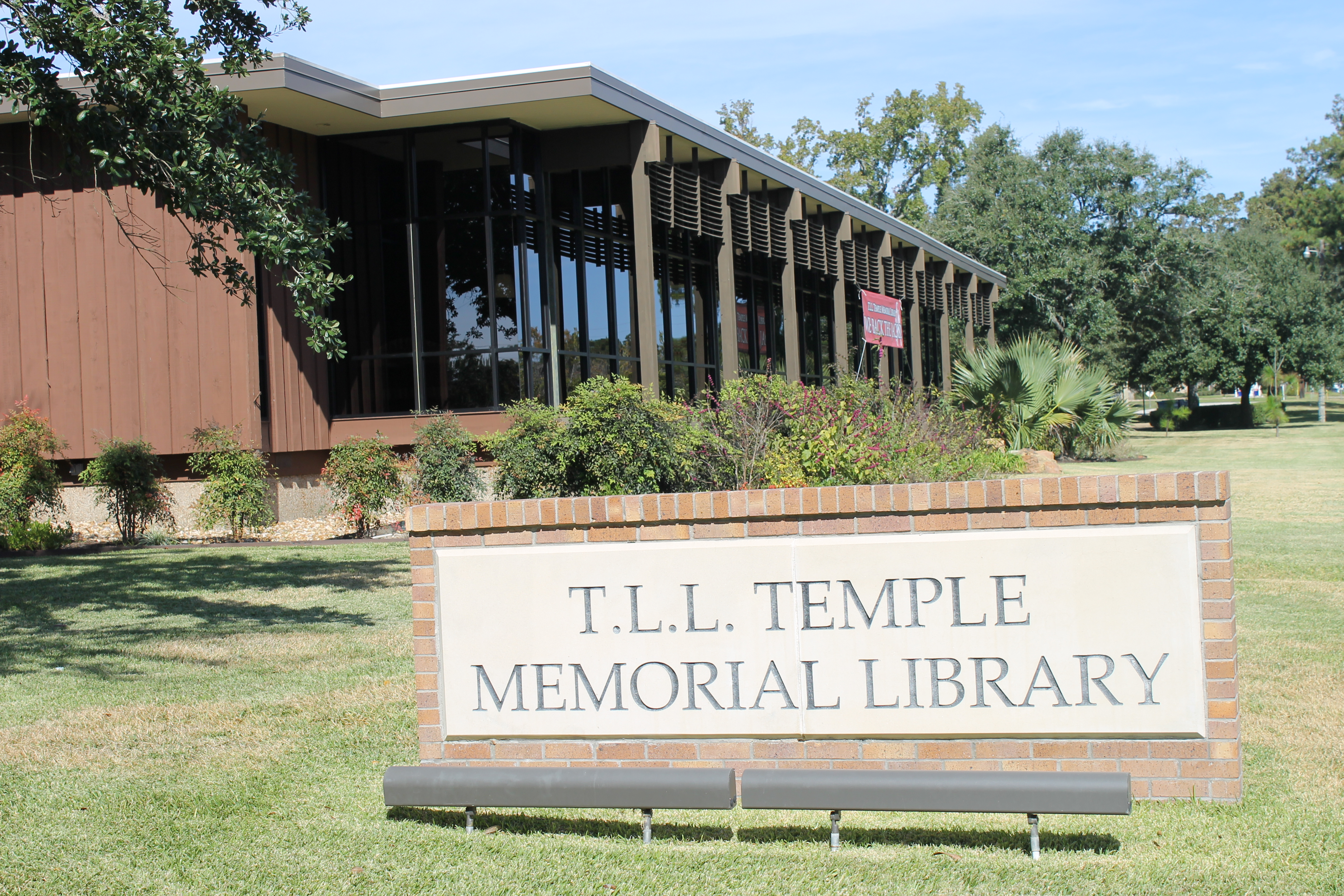
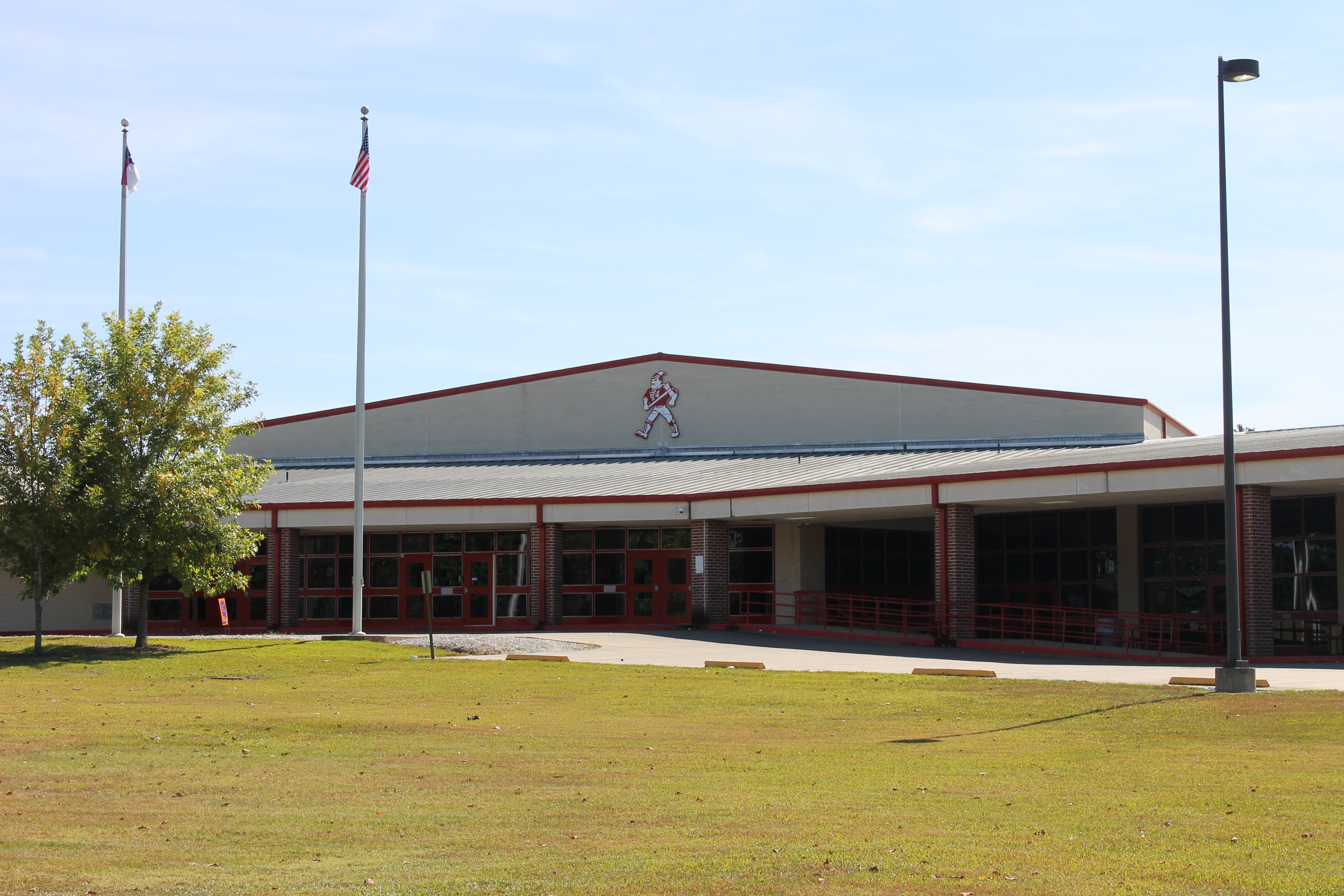
- Clockwise from top: Georgia Pacific offices; Diboll High School; and the T.L.L. Temple Memorial Library

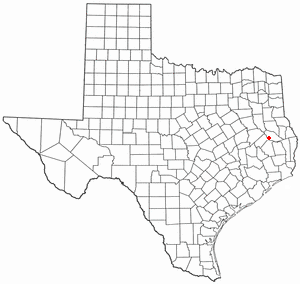
- Location of Diboll, Texas

- Coordinates: 31°11′14″N 94°47′08″W
- Country: United States
- State: Texas
- County: Angelina

Government
  - Type: Council–manager

Area
  - Total: 5.03 sq mi (13.04 km^{2})
  - Land: 4.98 sq mi (12.89 km^{2})
  - Water: 0.058 sq mi (0.15 km^{2})
- Elevation: 226 ft (69 m)

Population (2020)
  - Total: 4,457
  - Density: 1,045.8/sq mi (403.79/km^{2})
- Time zone: UTC-6 (Central (CST))
  - Summer (DST): UTC-5 (CDT)
- ZIP code: 75941
- Area code: 936
- FIPS code: 48-20308
- GNIS feature ID: 2410335
- Website: www.cityofdiboll.com

Diboll /ˈdaɪbɒl/ is a city in Angelina County, Texas, United States. The population was made up of 4,457 people according to the 2020 census. Diboll is named for J. C. Diboll, a local timber salesman.

== Geography ==
Diboll is located in southwestern Angelina County. U.S. Route 59 (future Interstate 69) passes through the city, leading north 11 miles (18 km) to Lufkin, the county seat, and south 109 miles (175 km) to Houston.

According to the United States Census Bureau, the city has a total area of 4.7 square miles (12.3 km^{2}), of which 4.7 square miles (12.2 km^{2}) is land and 0.04 square miles (0.1 km^{2}), or 1.20%, is water.

== Demographics ==
Historical population
Census	Pop.	Note	%±
1930	1,363		—
1970	3,557		—
1980	5,227		46.9%
1990	4,341		−17.0%
2000	5,470		26.0%
2010	4,776		−12.7%
2020	4,457		−6.7%
U.S. Decennial Census

=== 2020 census ===
As of the 2020 census, Diboll had a population of 4,457. The median age was 37.6 years. 24.7% of residents were under the age of 18 and 14.4% of residents were 65 years of age or older. For every 100 females there were 117.3 males, and for every 100 females age 18 and over there were 123.1 males age 18 and over.

There were 1,392 households in Diboll, of which 39.9% had children under the age of 18 living in them. Of all households, 44.5% were married-couple households, 16.9% were households with a male householder and no spouse or partner present, and 32.9% were households with a female householder and no spouse or partner present. About 22.9% of all households were made up of individuals and 10.0% had someone living alone who was 65 years of age or older.

There were 1,532 housing units, of which 9.1% were vacant. The homeowner vacancy rate was 1.5% and the rental vacancy rate was 9.6%.

0.0% of residents lived in urban areas, while 100.0% lived in rural areas.

Racial composition as of the 2020 census
Race	Number	Percent
White	1,808	40.6%
Black or African American	969	21.7%
American Indian and Alaska Native	9	0.2%
Asian	15	0.3%
Native Hawaiian and Other Pacific Islander	8	0.2%
Some other race	978	21.9%
Two or more races	670	15.0%
Hispanic or Latino (of any race)	2,081	46.7%

Diboll racial composition as of 2020 (NH = Non-Hispanic) (Note: Note: the US Census treats Hispanic/Latino as an ethnic category. This table excludes Latinos from the racial categories and assigns them to a separate category. Hispanics/Latinos can be of any race.)
Race	Number	Percentage
White (NH)	1,304	29.26%
Black or African American (NH)	959	21.52%
Native American or Alaska Native (NH)	2	0.04%
Asian (NH)	15	0.34%
Pacific Islander (NH)	3	0.07%
Some Other Race (NH)	6	0.13%
Mixed/Multi-Racial (NH)	87	1.95%
Hispanic or Latino	2,081	46.69%
Total	4,457	

=== 2000 census ===
As of the census of 2000, there were 5,470 people, 1,424 households, and 1,107 families residing in the city. The population density was 1,141.9 inhabitants per square mile (440.9/km^{2}). There were 1,582 housing units at an average density of 330.3 units per square mile (127.5 units/km^{2}). The racial makeup of the city was 53.67% White, 24.13% African American, 0.53% Native American, 0.05% Asian, 0.05% Pacific Islander, 19.40% from other races, and 2.16% from two or more races. Hispanic or Latino of any race were 37.26% of the population.

There were 1,424 households, out of which 43.4% had children under the age of 18 living with them, 54.4% were married couples living together, 19.2% had a female householder with no husband present, and 22.2% were non-families. 20.6% of all households were made up of individuals, and 10.0% had someone living alone who was 65 years of age or older. The average household size was 3.08 and the average family size was 3.57.

In the city, the population was spread out, with 27.2% under the age of 18, 10.7% from 18 to 24, 33.8% from 25 to 44, 19.6% from 45 to 64, and 8.7% who were 65 years of age or older. The median age was 32 years. For every 100 females, there were 132.7 males. For every 100 females age 18 and over, there were 143.3 males.

The median income for a household in the city was $28,183, and the median income for a family was $31,524. Males had a median income of $29,156 versus $18,324 for females. The per capita income for the city was $10,707. About 24.0% of families and 26.0% of the population were below the poverty line, including 34.4% of those under age 18 and 17.6% of those age 65 or over.

== Notable people ==
- Jermichael Finley, former Green Bay Packers football tight end (retired in 2015)
- John H. Hannah Jr., former Texas Secretary of State and United States federal judge
- Mack Mitchell, former football defensive end for the Cleveland Browns
- Arthur "Buddy" Temple Jr., former member of the Texas House of Representatives and Texas Railroad Commission; President and CEO of Temple Industries (later Temple-Inland), a major forest products manufacturer

== Education ==
Diboll is served by the Diboll Independent School District.

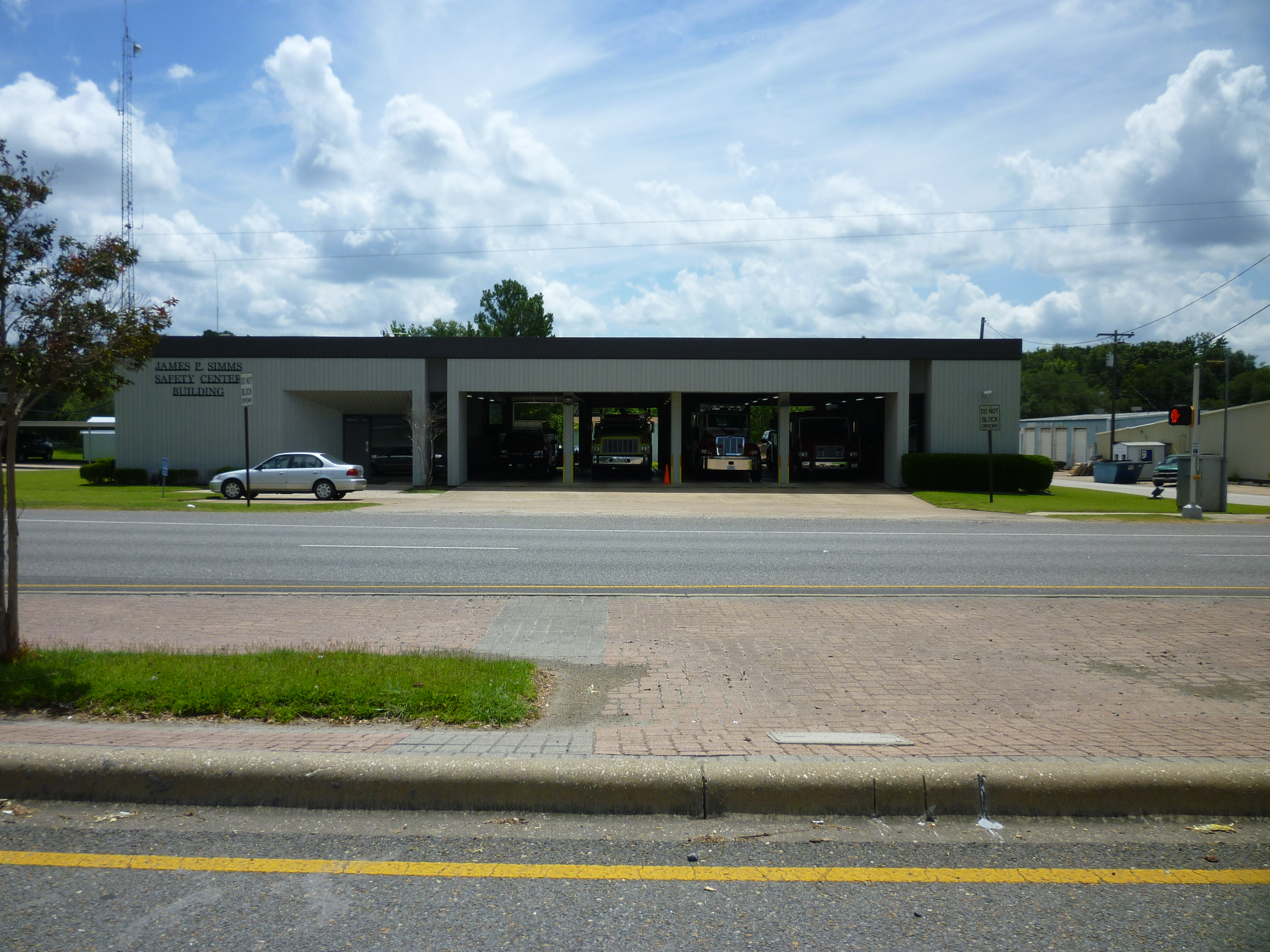
Diboll Safety Center which serves as the police and fire station

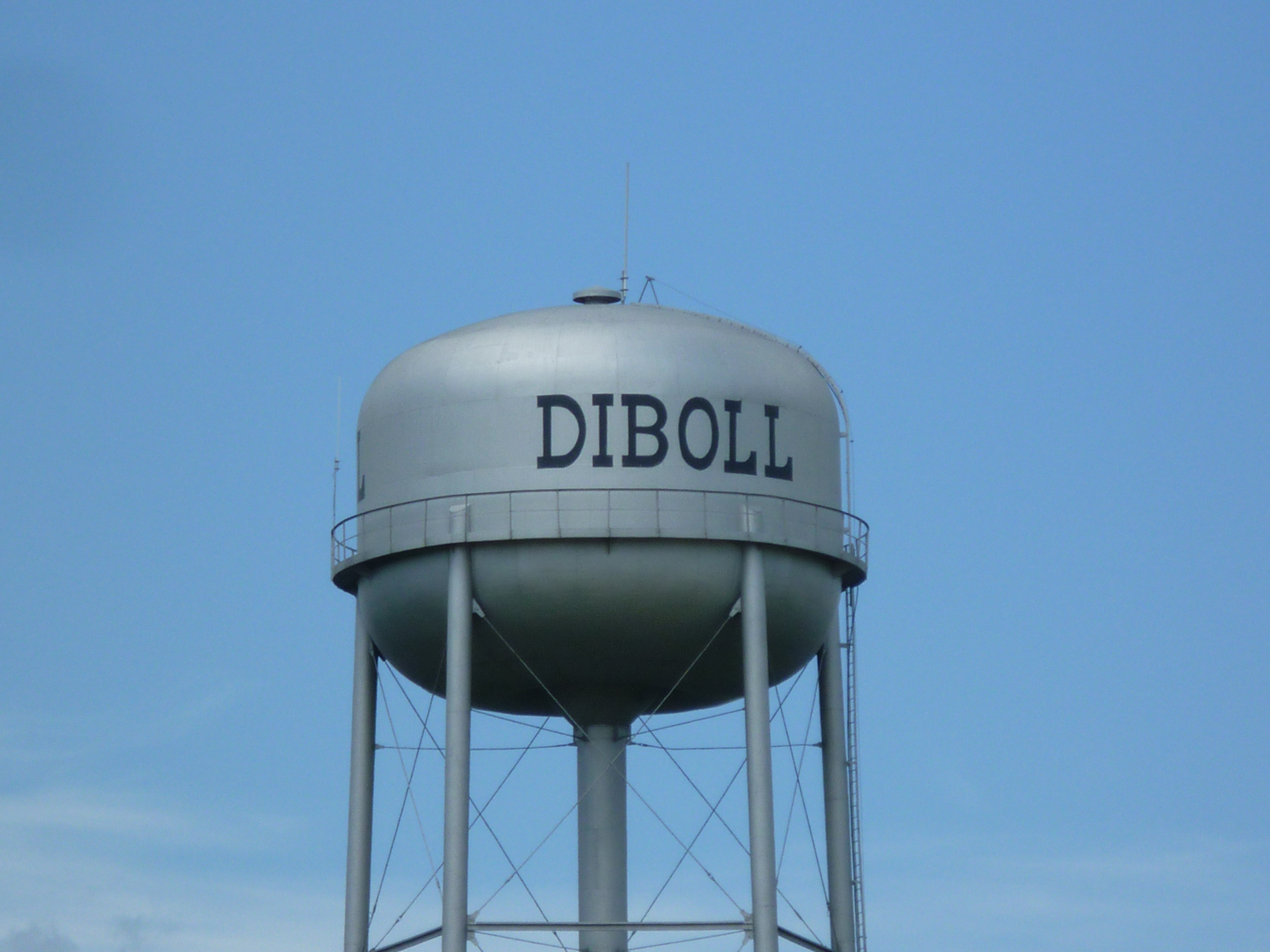
Diboll Water Tower

== Climate ==
The climate in this area is characterized by hot, humid summers and generally mild to cool winters. According to the Köppen Climate Classification system, Diboll has a humid subtropical climate, abbreviated "Cfa" on climate maps.
