= KHFZ =

Radio station in Pittsburg, Texas

- Pittsburg, Texas; United States
- Broadcast area: Longview-Marshall
- Frequency: 103.1 MHz
- Branding: Fuzíon

Programming
- Language: Spanish
- Format: Christian

Ownership
- Owner: Encouragement Media Group; (Educational Radio Foundation of East Texas, Inc.)
- Sister stations: KGFZ; KZWL; KELW; KLFZ; KVNE; KGLY

History
- First air date: January 20, 1987 (as KXAL-FM)
- Former call signs: KXAL-FM (1987–2001); KDVE (2001–2010); KMPA (2010–2022)
- Call sign meaning: Fuzíon (station branding)

Technical information
- Licensing authority: FCC
- Facility ID: 8491
- Class: C2
- ERP: 10,000 watts
- HAAT: 673 feet (205 m)
- Transmitter coordinates: 32°52′50″N 94°58′13″W
- Repeaters: KLFZ Jacksonville; KGFZ Burke; KVFZ Benton

Links
- Public license information: Public file; LMS
- Website: mifuzion.com

KHFZ (103.1 FM) is a terrestrial American radio station, licensed to Pittsburg, Texas, United States. The station serves the Longview-Marshall area, and simulcasts KLFZ Jacksonville, Texas, which covers the Tyler-Jacksonville area.

== History ==
On January 20, 1987, 103.1 went on the air as KXAL-FM. KXAL-FM was owned by Gray Communications of Pittsburg, Texas. The transmitter site was next located on Highway 271 just north of Gilmer in the community of Midway. The tower was under 250 feet (76 m) tall and the coverage of the station was very limited. 103.1 was running a rock format at that time. Through most of the 1990s until 1997, KXAL-FM was a country station branded as "Star Country 103.1" and then as "Hot Country 103.1" until it flipped to a classic rock format as "The Rock, 103.1." At this time, KXAL-FM started targeting Longview in addition to Pittsburg and Gilmer. The classic rock format lasted until Fall 1998 when KXAL-FM switched to rhythmic contemporary as "K-103." KXAL-FM had a marginal signal over the Tyler/Longview radio market that was a competitive setback. KXAL-FM was the only station in the market with a rhythmic contemporary format until KBLZ signed on in Fall 1999. KBLZ along with simulcast KAZE had signals that provided better coverage of the Tyler/Longview area. Shortly after KBLZ signed on, KXAL-FM switched to an ABC satellite-fed hot AC format, still branded as "K-103." This lasted until December 2000, when KXAL-FM switched to a simulcast of the "Lonesome Dove" classic country format of KDVE 100.3.

On January 3, 2000, Gray Communications sold 103.1 to On-Air Family LLC (Hunt Broadcasting). Under Hunt's ownership the transmitter site was completely rebuilt with a 750-foot (230 m) tower, new antennas, and new transmitter on a 50-acre (20 ha) facility just north-east of Midway. The Hunts also combined 103.1's broadcast operations with the 100.3 (at that time KDVE) in Henderson, Texas.

The Hunts changed the call letters to KDVE on November 8, 2001. With this change, the format was also changed to classic country, under the moniker of "The Lonesome Dove" (after the movie of the same name). With both 103.1 and 100.3 simulcasting "The Lonesome Dove" format, the studios were moved to Longview at 3004 West Marshall (Greggton area). In July 2004, 103.1 KDVE changed its format to classic rock, with the moniker "Rock 103.1". 100.3 became KXAL sports with the ESPN satellite feed.

On April 1, 2004, 103.1 and 100.3 began an LMA with Waller Broadcasting. 103.1 became a simulcast of KKUS the Ranch, and 100.3 became a simulcast of 96.7 KOYE. In 2006, Waller Media bought 103.1 and 100.3. 103.1 became the first FM talk station in East Texas, and 100.3 became "Brisa" a regional Spanish format. The FM talk was dropped after six months with little results, and a simulcast of 103.1 and 100.3 began again with the "Brisa" format. 103.1 changed its call sign to KMPA on July 30, 2010, and rebranded itself as KOMPA. KOMPA 103.1 was a highly successful Spanish format radio station in East Texas.

On August 1, 2016, KMPA and sister stations KFRO-FM, KLJT, and KZXM were taken off the air and the staff of those stations were let go and locked out without warning by Susie Waller, the daughter of the deceased owner of the station, Dudley Waller. The website had also been deleted. Beginning August 10, 2016, this station was silent.

On February 17, 2017, Waller Broadcasting filed for an extension of the Special Temporary Authority allowing KMPA and its three sisters to remain silent for an additional 180 days. The application also stated that a buyer had been found for the stations, and was expected to announce a deal to transfer the four stations' licenses, pending F.C.C. approval, within the next 30 days.

On July 4, 2017, KMPA returned to the air under a Lease Management Agreement between Waller Media, LLC. and East Texas Results Media, allowing the latter to operate the facility until the license transfer for the facility was granted & consummated. The Kompa branding for the station was dropped, although the Regional Mexican music remained, newly branded as "Super 103.1".

On October 31, 2017, KMPA's license transfer to Paul Coates, d.b.a. East Texas Results Media, was granted. Completion of the deal that transferred KMPA and its sister stations KFRO-FM, KZXM, and KLJT to the new company occurred on March 8, 2018.

On June 10, 2019, East Texas Results Media filed to transfer the license of KMPA and its three sister stations to Encouragement Media Group, who in turn applied to turn all four facilities non-commercial. The Foundation broadcasts Christian programming.

"Super 103.1" left the air in mid-July 2019, pending transfer of the facility's license.

The sale of KMPA and its three sister stations was consummated on October 8, 2019, with ERFET officially taking control of the licenses and facilities. As part of the new acquisition, Educational Radio Foundation of East Texas announced at the time that they would launch a full service Spanish language Christian format on both KLJT and KMPA.

Encouragement Media Group launched the current Spanish language Christian format, branded as "Fuzíon 102.3 & 103.1" on January 17, 2020, at 7:00 pm. Between the two, the combined signals serve the majority of the Tyler-Longview rated market.

KMPA previously featured a Regional Mexican format branded as Super 103.1 prior to the sale of the facility to Educational Radio Foundation of East Texas.

On July 22, 2022, the station changed its call sign to KHFZ.
