= Burke, Texas =

- City
- Interactive map of Burke, Texas
- Coordinates: 31°14′15″N 94°45′44″W
- Country: United States
- State: Texas
- County: Angelina

Government
  - Type: Municipal

Area
  - Total: 2.85 sq mi (7.37 km^{2})
  - Land: 2.81 sq mi (7.29 km^{2})
  - Water: 0.031 sq mi (0.08 km^{2})
- Elevation: 272 ft (83 m)

Population (2020)
  - Total: 691
  - Density: 245/sq mi (94.8/km^{2})
- Time zone: UTC-6 (Central (CST))
  - Summer (DST): UTC-5 (CDT)
- ZIP: 75941-9507
- Area code: 936
- FIPS code: 48-11380
- GNIS feature ID: 2409942

Burke is a city in southwestern Angelina County, Texas, United States. The population was 691 at the 2020 census.

== History ==
Burke was founded in 1881 when construction of the Houston, East and West Texas Railway reached the western edge of Bradley Prairie. The town was originally named Rhodes, for general store owner W. R. Rhodes and postmaster H. R. Rhodes, but circa 1885 it was renamed for Edmund L. Burke, a railroad employee who directed the railroad survey.

By 1885 Burke had three sawmills, three cotton gins, a church, and a school. In 1886, it received a post office, which remained there until 1955. By 1888, it had a larger school, three general stores, a drugstore, a sawmill, a dentist and watchmaker, and a Farmers' Alliance store. In 1897, Burke had an estimated population of 650. By 1904, Burke's population had declined to 161, due to the rise of Lufkin, eight miles north, as an industrial center for the county. However, by 1915 the population had risen to 200, and by 1925 it reached 300. The Burke Methodist Church was organized in 1899–1900, and the First Baptist Church of Burke in 1905.

Education was a priority at Burke. The first school, a one-room structure, was enlarged to three rooms within a few years. Voters approved a bond in 1910 to erect a brick schoolhouse for grades one through seven. The brick building was torn down in 1935 and replaced with a larger schoolhouse built with WPA funds. The Burke Independent School District consolidated with the Diboll schools in 1964.

Burke was incorporated as a city in 1966, and a municipal water system was constructed. Burke had a population of 322 in 1980 and 314 in 1990.

== Geography ==
According to the United States Census Bureau, the city has a total area of 2.8 square miles (7.3 km^{2}), of which 2.77 square miles (7.2 km^{2}) is land and 0.03 square miles (0.078 km^{2}) is water.

=== Climate ===
The climate in this area is characterized by hot, humid summers and generally mild to cool winters. According to the Köppen Climate Classification system, Burke has a humid subtropical climate, abbreviated "Cfa" on climate maps.

== Demographics ==
Historical population
Census	Pop.	Note	%±
1970	188		—
1980	322		71.3%
1990	314		−2.5%
2000	315		0.3%
2010	737		134.0%
2020	691		−6.2%
U.S. Decennial Census; 2020 Census

=== 2020 census ===
As of the 2020 census, Burke had a population of 691. The median age was 35.5 years, 26.2% of residents were under the age of 18, and 18.8% of residents were 65 years of age or older. For every 100 females there were 98.6 males, and for every 100 females age 18 and over there were 95.4 males age 18 and over.

There were 251 households in Burke, of which 43.8% had children under the age of 18 living in them. Of all households, 52.2% were married-couple households, 18.7% were households with a male householder and no spouse or partner present, and 22.3% were households with a female householder and no spouse or partner present. About 18.0% of all households were made up of individuals and 8.4% had someone living alone who was 65 years of age or older.

There were 268 housing units, of which 6.3% were vacant. Among occupied housing units, 71.3% were owner-occupied and 28.7% were renter-occupied. The homeowner vacancy rate was <0.1% and the rental vacancy rate was 8.9%.

0% of residents lived in urban areas, while 100.0% lived in rural areas.

Racial composition as of the 2020 census
Race	Percent
White	77.4%
Black or African American	2.7%
American Indian and Alaska Native	0.4%
Asian	1.0%
Native Hawaiian and Other Pacific Islander	0.4%
Some other race	8.4%
Two or more races	9.6%
Hispanic or Latino (of any race)	24.2%

=== 2000 census ===
As of the census of 2000, there were 315 people, 114 households, and 85 families residing in the city. The population density was 501.5 inhabitants per square mile (193.6/km^{2}). There were 138 housing units at an average density of 219.7 units per square mile (84.8 units/km^{2}). The racial makeup of the city was 91.43% White, 1.27% African American, 1.90% Native American, 3.81% from other races, and 1.59% from two or more races. Hispanic or Latino of any race were 22.22% of the population.

There were 114 households, out of which 36.8% had children under the age of 18 living with them, 59.6% were married couples living together, 10.5% had a female householder with no husband present, and 25.4% were non-families. 23.7% of all households were made up of individuals, and 12.3% had someone living alone who was 65 years of age or older. The average household size was 2.76 and the average family size was 3.28.

In the city, the population was spread out, with 27.0% under the age of 18, 12.4% from 18 to 24, 30.2% from 25 to 44, 16.2% from 45 to 64, and 14.3% who were 65 years of age or older. The median age was 31 years. For every 100 females, there were 86.4 males. For every 100 females age 18 and over, there were 88.5 males.

The median income for a household in the city was $29,821, and the median income for a family was $34,375. Males had a median income of $31,250 versus $18,472 for females. The per capita income for the city was $12,033. About 15.7% of families and 14.4% of the population were below the poverty line, including 9.9% of those under age 18 and 17.4% of those age 65 or over.

== Education ==
Burke is a part of the Diboll Independent School District. A very small portion lies within the Lufkin ISD.
