= Blanchard, Louisiana =

- Town
- Town of Blanchard
- Motto: "Reach out and grab your future...It's all in Blanchard"
- Location of Blanchard in Caddo Parish, Louisiana.

- Location of Louisiana in the United States
- Coordinates: 32°36′42″N 93°52′45″W
- Country: United States
- State: Louisiana
- Parish: Caddo

Area
  - Total: 3.49 sq mi (9.03 km^{2})
  - Land: 3.49 sq mi (9.03 km^{2})
  - Water: 0 sq mi (0.00 km^{2})
- Elevation: 223 ft (68 m)

Population (2020)
  - Total: 3,538
  - Estimate (2024): 3,371 ▼
  - Rank: CD: 4th
  - Density: 1,014.9/sq mi (391.85/km^{2})
- Time zone: UTC-6 (CST)
  - Summer (DST): UTC-5 (CDT)
- ZIP code: 71009
- Area code: 318
- FIPS code: 22-07730
- GNIS feature ID: 2405278
- Website: www.townofblanchard.us

Blanchard is the suburban town in, and the second-largest municipality by population of Caddo Parish in the U.S. state of Louisiana. With a population of 3,538 at the 2020 U.S. census, it is part of the Shreveport–Bossier City metropolitan statistical area.

== History ==
Blanchard was likely named for Newton C. Blanchard, a United States Representative, Senator, and the 33rd Governor of Louisiana.

== Geography ==
Blanchard is located along Louisiana Highway 173 passes through the town as Main Street. Downtown Shreveport is 10 miles (16 km) to the southeast. According to the United States Census Bureau, the town has a total area of 4.0 square miles (10.3 km^{2}), all land.

== Demographics ==
Historical population
Census	Pop.	Note	%±
1970	806		—
1980	1,128		40.0%
1990	1,175		4.2%
2000	2,050		74.5%
2010	2,899		41.4%
2020	3,538		22.0%
2025 (est.)	3,360	▼	−5.0%
U.S. Decennial Census

=== 2020 census ===
As of the 2020 census, Blanchard had a population of 3,538. The median age was 37.1 years. 26.2% of residents were under the age of 18 and 13.7% of residents were 65 years of age or older. For every 100 females there were 87.5 males, and for every 100 females age 18 and over there were 85.9 males age 18 and over.

95.2% of residents lived in urban areas, while 4.8% lived in rural areas.

There were 1,378 households in Blanchard, of which 39.8% had children under the age of 18 living in them. Of all households, 53.7% were married-couple households, 13.6% were households with a male householder and no spouse or partner present, and 26.6% were households with a female householder and no spouse or partner present. About 21.6% of all households were made up of individuals and 9.9% had someone living alone who was 65 years of age or older. The town had 944 families.

There were 1,449 housing units, of which 4.9% were vacant. The homeowner vacancy rate was 1.6% and the rental vacancy rate was 7.8%.

Blanchard racial composition as of 2020
Race	Number	Percentage
White (non-Hispanic)	2,688	75.98%
Black or African American (non-Hispanic)	525	14.84%
Native American	22	0.62%
Asian	25	0.71%
Pacific Islander	4	0.11%
Other/Mixed	159	4.49%
Hispanic or Latino	115	3.25%

Following the 2020 census, Blanchard overtook Vivian as the second-largest incorporated municipality in Caddo Parish. Prior to the 2020 census, Blanchard was the fourth-most populous community in the parish, behind Greenwood, which had a 2010 population of 2,899.

=== 2000 census ===
As of the 2000 census, there were 2,682 people, 787 households, and 602 families residing in the town.

In 2000, the racial makeup of the town was 95.32% White, 2.93% African American, 0.54% Native American, 0.39% Asian, 0.10% Pacific Islander, 0.10% from other races, and 0.63% from two or more races. Hispanic or Latino of any race were 0.59% of the population.

=== Income and poverty ===
The median income for a household in the town was $44,750, and the median income for a family was $58,047 per the 2000 census. Males had a median income of $41,161 versus $26,161 for females. The per capita income for the town was $22,391. About 2.8% of families and 5.2% of the population were below the poverty line, including 3.1% of those under age 18 and 13.7% of those age 65 or over. At the publication of the 2020 American Community Survey, the median household income increased to $80,972. Its mean income was $87,881, making it one of the wealthiest communities in North Louisiana and Caddo Parish overall.

== Education ==
It is in the Caddo Parish School District.

== Notable people ==
- Elle Evans, former Miss Teen Louisiana 2008; "Miss October 2009" Playmate for Playboy
- Hal Sutton, professional golfer
