= KMAD (AM) =

- Madill, Oklahoma; United States
- Frequency: 1550 kHz

Programming
- Format: Christian radio

Ownership
- Owner: Richard Witkovski; (North Texas Radio Group, L.P.)

Technical information
- Licensing authority: FCC
- Facility ID: 54811
- Class: D
- Power: 250 watts (day); 90 watts (night)
- Transmitter coordinates: 34.10667°N 96.77500°W

Links
- Public license information: Public file; LMS
- Website: faithfamily3abnradio.org/communities/madill-ok/

KMAD is a radio station airing a Christian format, licensed to Madill, Oklahoma and broadcasting on 1550 AM. The station is owned by Richard Witkovski, through licensee North Texas Radio Group, L.P.

== Translators ==
Call sign	Frequency	City of license	FID	ERP (W)	HAAT	Class	FCC info
K254DQ	98.7 FM	Madill, Oklahoma	156875	250 vertical	116 m (381 ft)	D	LMS
