= List of chancellors of the University of Houston System =

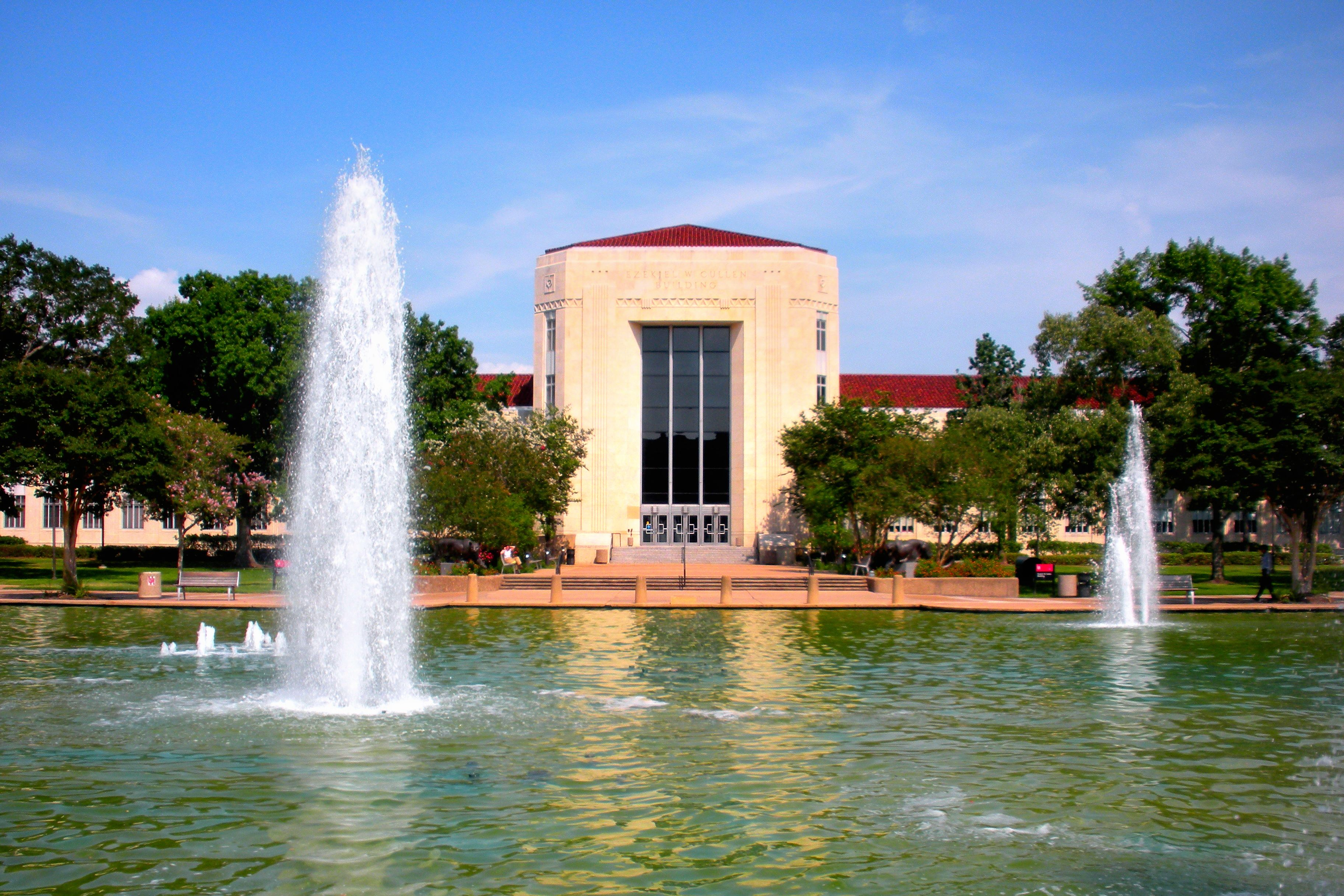
The Ezekiel W. Cullen Building at the University of Houston has housed the chancellor's office since 1997

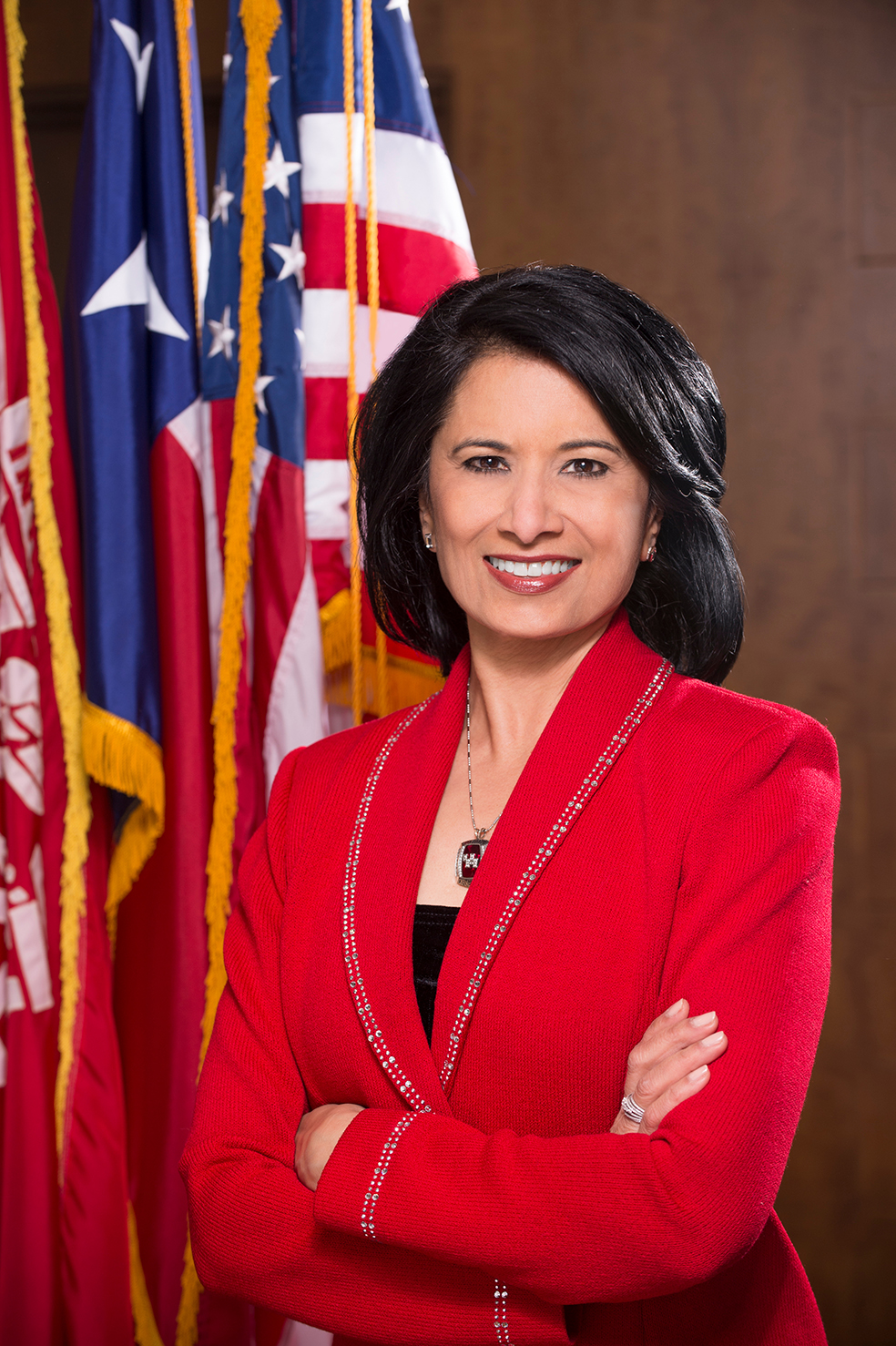
Renu Khator, the eighth chancellor of the University of Houston System

The office of Chancellor of the University of Houston System, held by Renu Khator, was created with the establishment of the University of Houston System in 1977 as the chief executive officer of the university system.

Since 1997, the chancellor of the University of Houston System has also held the position of President of the University of Houston, thus making it a dual office.

Number	Name	Tenure	Life	Notes & Events
1	Philip G. Hoffman	1977–1979	1915–2008	First chancellor of the University of Houston System and former president of the University of Houston
2	Charles E. Bishop	1980–1986	1921–2012	
3	Wilbur L. Meier	1986–1989	1939–2008	
Interim	Glenn A. Goerke	1989	1931–2015	Former president of the University of Houston, the University of Houston–Clear Lake, and the University of Houston–Victoria
4	Alexander F. Schilt	1989–1995	1941–	Former president of the University of Houston–Downtown
5	William P. Hobby, Jr.	1995–1997	1932–	Former Lieutenant Governor of Texas
6	Arthur K. Smith	1997–2003	1937–	First person to hold the dual position of chancellor of the University of Houston System and president of the University of Houston
7	Jay Gogue	2003–2007	1947–	
Interim	John M. Rudley	2007	1947–	
8	Renu Khator	2008–	1955–	First female and foreign-born chancellor of the University of Houston System
