= William Staples =

William Staples may refer to:

- William A. Staples, president of the University of Houston–Clear Lake
- William D. Staples (1868–1929), Canadian farmer, politician, and officeholder
- William R. Staples (1798–1868), justice of the Rhode Island Supreme Court (1854–56)
