= Charles E. Bishop =

American economist (1921–2012)

2nd Chancellor of the University of Houston System
- In office 1980–1986
- Preceded by: Philip G. Hoffman
- Succeeded by: Wilbur L. Meier

President of the University of Arkansas
- In office 1974–1980
- Preceded by: David Wiley Mullins
- Succeeded by: James E. Martin

Chancellor of the University of Maryland, College Park
- In office 1970–1974
- Preceded by: Wilson Homer Elkins (as president)
- Succeeded by: John W. Dorsey (acting)

Personal details
- Born: June 8, 1921 Campobello, South Carolina, U.S.
- Died: January 14, 2012 (aged 90) Durham, North Carolina, U.S.
- Education: Berea College; University of Kentucky; University of Chicago
- Occupation: agricultural economist

Charles Edwin Bishop (June 8, 1921 – January 14, 2012) was an American academic. He was chancellor of the University of Houston System from 1980 to 1986, president of the University of Arkansas from 1974 to 1980, and chancellor of the University of Maryland, College Park from 1970 to 1974. Bishop attended Berea College, the University of Kentucky, and University of Chicago. He had a B.S. in agriculture educations, an M.S. in agriculture economics, and a Ph.D. in economics. He also taught at North Carolina State University and served as vice president of the University of North Carolina.
