= List of presidents of the University of Houston =

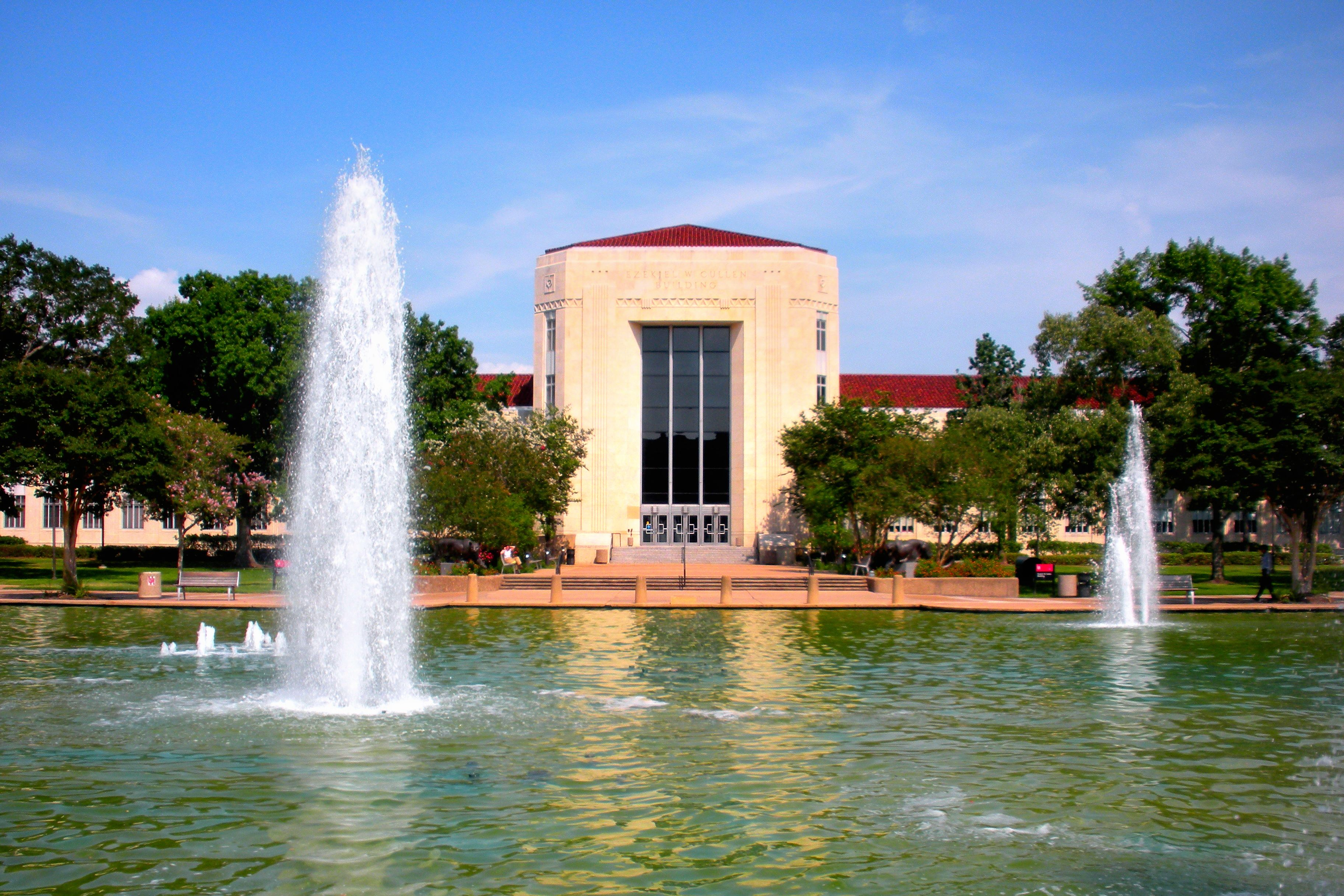
The Ezekiel W. Cullen Building at the University of Houston has housed the President's office since 1950.

The office of the President of the University of Houston, currently held by Renu Khator, was created with the founding of the University of Houston (then known as Houston Junior College) in 1927 as the chief executive officer of the school. From 1927 until 1945 when UH separated from Houston Independent School District, the university's president also held the position of superintendent of schools of that school district. In 1956, the duties of president were divided into two positions. The position of chancellor was created to fulfill past presidential duties regarding external affairs, while the president remained responsible for internal affairs of the university. This leadership structure lasted until 1961, when the university became a state-run, public institution. The duties of the chancellor and president became re-consolidated back into the sole position of president.

Since 1997, the president of the University of Houston has also held the position of chancellor of the University of Houston System, thus making it a dual-office. Note: The defunct chancellor of the University of Houston position should not be confused with the current position of chancellor of the University of Houston System. While one position refers to a leader of the single flagship institution of the University of Houston System, the latter refers to the leader of the entire University of Houston System consisting of several other universities besides the flagship institution.

The following persons have served as president of the University of Houston:

No.	Image	Name	Term start	Term end	Ref.
1		Edison E. Oberholtzer	1927	1950	
interim		Walter William Kemmerer	1950	1950	
2		Walter William Kemmerer	1950	1953	
interim		Charles Flemming McElhinney	1953	1954	
3		A.D. Bruce (Note: Served as Chancellor of the University of Houston when that position was created until 1961, helped to establish UH as a state school)	1954	1956	
4		Clanton Ware Williams (Note: Served as President after A.D. Bruce became Chancellor)	1956	1961	
5		Philip Guthrie Hoffman (Note: First chancellor of the University of Houston System)	1961	1977	
6		Barry Munitz	1977	1982	
interim		Hugh Walker	1982	1983	
7		Richard L. Van Horn	1983	July 12, 1989 (Note: Resign to head the University of Oklahoma.)	
interim		George W. Magner (Note: Ended the tradition of a live cougar Shasta mascot)	July 12, 1989	August 31, 1990	
8		Marguerite Ross Barnett (Note: First female and first black president; took a leave of absence after being diagnosed with cancer)	September 1, 1990	February 26, 1992 (Note: Died in office while on medical leave.)	
acting		James H. Pickering	January 28, 1992	April 22, 1992	
interim		James H. Pickering	April 22, 1992	April 19, 1993	
9		James H. Pickering	April 19, 1993	July 31, 1995	
10		Glenn Allan Goerke	August 1, 1995	March 31, 1997	
11		Arthur K. Smith (Note: First person to hold UH Presidency and UHS Chancellor position simultaneously)	April 1, 1997	August 31, 2003	
12		Jay Gogue	September 1, 2003	May 31, 2007 (Note: Resigned to head Auburn University.)	
interim		John M. Rudley (Note: President of Texas Southern University from 2008 to 2016)	June 1, 2007	January 14, 2008	
13		Renu Khator (Note: First foreign-born president, allowed for re-establishment of live Shasta mascot)	January 15, 2008	present	

Table notes:
