= University of Houston–Clear Lake =

Public university in Pasadena and Houston, Texas, U.S.

- Type: Public university
- Established: 1974
- Parent institution: University of Houston System
- Endowment: $34.05 million (FY2024) (UHCL only) $1.11 billion (FY2024) (system-wide)
- Budget: $172.2 million (FY2025)
- President: Richard Walker
- Provost: Christopher Maynard
- Faculty: 744
- Students: 8,961
- Undergraduates: 6,488
- Postgraduates: 2,473
- Location: Pasadena/Houston, Texas, United States; 29.577607°N 95.107262°W
- Campus: Suburban, 524 acres (2.12 km^{2})
- Colors: Blue and green
- Nickname: Hawks
- Mascot: Hunter the Hawk
- Website: uhcl.edu

The University of Houston–Clear Lake (UHCL) is a public university in Pasadena and Houston in Texas, with branch campuses in Pearland and Texas Medical Center. It is part of the University of Houston System. Founded in 1971, UHCL had an enrollment of more than 9,000 students for fall 2019.

The university serves students in four academic colleges. UHCL offers 97 degree programs: 46 bachelors, 48 masters, and three doctoral. Awarding more than 2,100 degrees annually, the university's alumni base exceeds 73,000.

== History ==
In 1961 NASA announced that the Manned Spacecraft Center would be located in Houston just off the shores of Clear Lake. Early in the development of the Manned Spacecraft Center, a demand for graduate studies grew within NASA and the nearby space-related industries.

In 1964 the University of Houston (UH) began offering courses in physics, math, and various engineering programs to NASA employees at the Manned Spacecraft Center (MSC). On Sept. 10, 1965, MSC Director Robert R. Gilruth formally requested that the University of Houston give immediate consideration to the establishment of a permanent graduate and undergraduate educational facility in the Clear Lake area. UH President Philip G. Hoffman replied that "… it would be difficult for us to be unresponsive to vital needs of the MSC and its staff," but indicated that "the acquisition of appropriate land in the Clear Lake City area would be of crucial importance to this project."

Humble Oil responded by donating 50 acres (200,000 m^{2}) of land in the Clear Lake City development to the University of Houston for the establishment of a permanent undergraduate and graduate facility. A total of 487 acres (1.97 km^{2}) would be donated from the Friendswood Development Corp. to become the University of Houston at Clear Lake City.

In 1968 the Coordinating Board of Texas College and University System authorized the University of Houston to build the Clear Lake Graduate Center (CLGC) on the original 50-acre (200,000 m^{2}). In addition, the Coordinating Board called for the creation of a stand-alone university in Clear Lake to offer upper-division and graduate-level programs adjacent to CLGC. Four years later in 1971, the 62nd Texas Legislature passed House Bill 199 authorizing the creation of the University of Houston at Clear Lake City as a separate and distinct degree-granting institution.

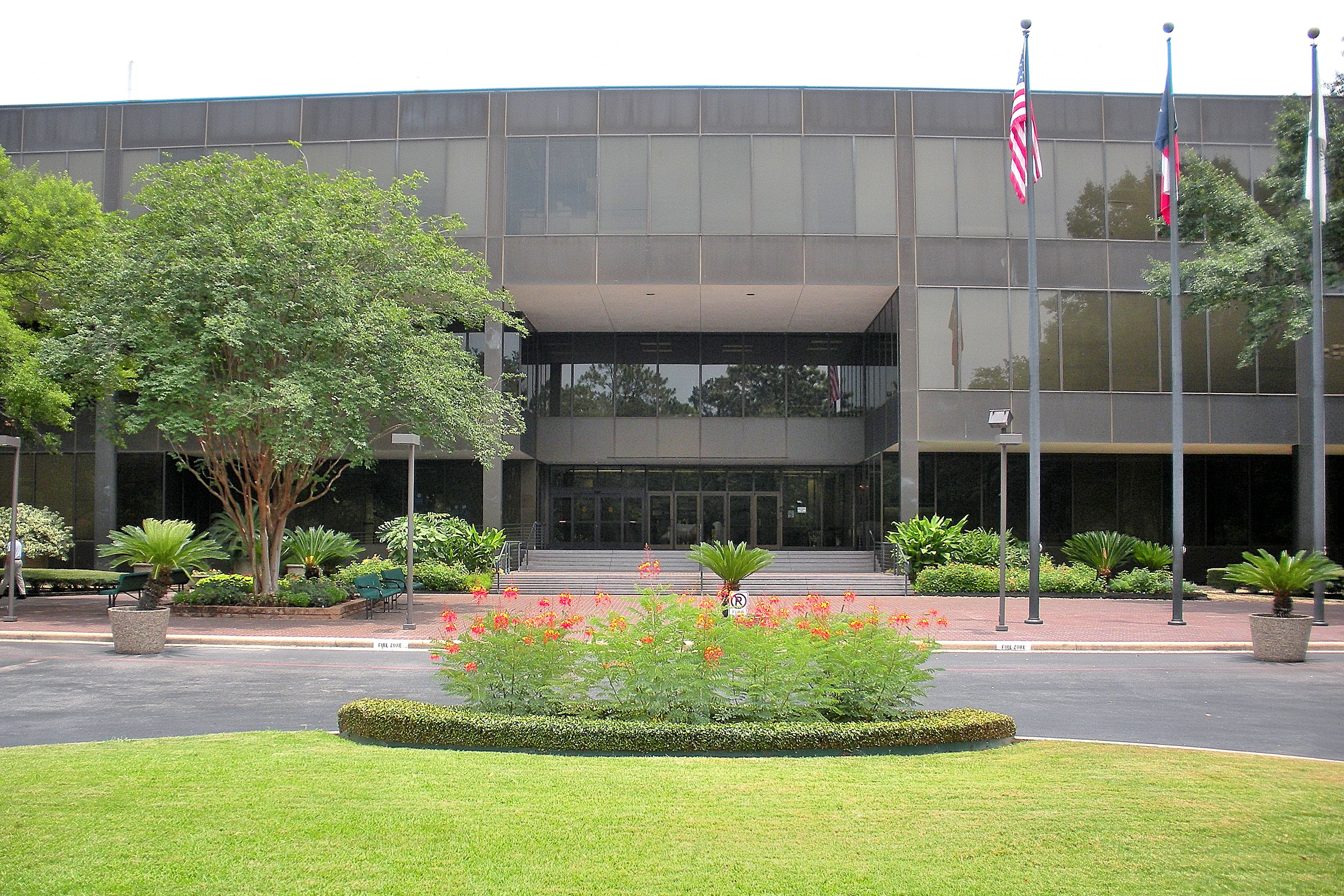
Bayou Building

The Clear Lake Graduate Center opened in January 1972. The first phase construction of the Bayou Building for the University of Houston at Clear Lake City (UH/CLC) began early in 1974. On June 1, 1974, the Clear Lake Graduate Center facility became part of UH/CLC and took on the name "Arbor Building". The Bayou Building opened in September 1974 and classes began at UH/CLC under the leadership of the institution's founding president, Alfred R. Neumann. The first-class day enrollment was 1,069 students with 60 professors comprised the charter faculty.

In 1977 the 65th Texas Legislature established the University of Houston System that included UH/CLC as a component institution. The University of Houston at Clear Lake City was renamed University of Houston–Clear Lake on April 26, 1983. During the 73rd Texas Legislature in 1993, an unsuccessful attempt was made by the City of Pasadena to change the institution's name to the University of Houston at Pasadena.

In January 2011, Senate Bill 324 was filed in the 82nd Texas Legislature for the institution's downward expansion by adding freshman and sophomore course offerings. The bill was passed and signed into law by Gov. Rick Perry on June 17, 2011. The university began offering freshman and sophomore classes in fall 2014.

=== Presidents ===
The office of the president of the University of Houston–Clear Lake, held by interim President Richard Walker, was created with the establishment of the university in 1971 as the chief executive officer of the institution.

- Alfred R. Neumann (1972–1982)
- Thomas M. Stauffer (1982–1991)
- Glenn A. Goerke (1991–1995)
- William A. Staples (1995–2017)
- Ira K. Blake (2017–2021)
- Richard Walker (2021–)

== Organization ==
Coat of arms of University of Houston–Clear Lake

The University of Houston–Clear Lake (UHCL) is one of three separate and distinct institutions in the University of Houston System. The institution is separately accredited, offers its own academic programs and confers its own degrees, and has its own administration. UHCL is a stand-alone university; it is not a branch campus of the University of Houston (UH). Although UHCL and UH are both component institutions of the University of Houston System, they are separate degree-granting universities.

The organization and control of the University of Houston–Clear Lake is vested in the Board of Regents of the University of Houston System. The Board has all the rights, powers, and duties that it has with respect to the organization and control of other institutions in the System; however, UHCL is maintained as a separate and distinct institution.

The president is the chief executive officer of the University of Houston–Clear Lake, and the position reports to the chancellor of the University of Houston System. The president is appointed by the chancellor and confirmed by the Board of Regents of the University of Houston System. UHCL administration is located in the Bayou Building.

== Campuses ==
Undergraduate demographics as of Fall 2023
Race and ethnicity	Total
Hispanic	50%
White	30%
Asian	8%
Black	7%
Two or more races	3%
International student	2%
Unknown	1%
Economic diversity
Low-income (Note: The percentage of students who received an income-based federal Pell grant intended for low-income students.)	44%
Affluent (Note: The percentage of students who are a part of the American middle class at the bare minimum.)	56%

=== Main campus ===
The main campus is partially in Pasadena and partially in Houston.

It is located on a nature habitat adjacent to the Houston community of Clear Lake. The campus sits in a bottomland hardwood forest adjacent to the Lyndon B. Johnson Space Center and the Armand Bayou Nature Center and is home to a wide range of wildlife including alligators, wild turkeys, bobcats, and whitetail deer.

The Clear Lake campus consists of six classroom buildings: the Bayou Building, Arbor Building, Delta Building, Student Services and Classroom Building, and two new facilities opened in fall 2018: the STEM and Classroom Building and Recreation and Wellness Center. Additionally, the campus includes a physical plant maintenance facility, the headquarters building of the Environmental Institute of Houston, and the University Forest Apartments. Construction on a traditional residence hall began in 2018. Named after the university's mascot, Hunter Residence Hall opened its doors to students in fall 2019.

Besides administrative offices, labs and classrooms, the Bayou Building also houses Patio Cafe, the campus book store and the 500-seat Bayou Theater, which was renovated in 2018. The Bayou Building is also home to the Alfred R. Neumann Library, an 80,000-square-foot (7,400 m^{2}) space containing over 480,000 volumes and over 1,000 journal and periodical subscriptions. The library has online access to over 100 subscription-only research databases and the Texshare interlibrary loan service which allows students to check out items from any academic or public library in Texas. Additionally, the library houses the University Archives, which includes the NASA Johnson Space Center History Collection.

Delta Building houses computer science and computer engineering programs, including the Cyber Security Institute and Center for Robotics Software. The STEM and Classroom Building houses UHCL's mechanical engineering, physics, astronomy, chemistry, environmental science and other engineering programs, including many labs and classrooms.

The Recreation and Wellness Center offers seven fitness zones, personal training, small group training, group fitness classes, workshops, an elevated indoor track and other amenities. It is also home of the Exercise and Nutritional Health Institute.

The Arbor Building was constructed in 1971 and was the first building on campus. It is home to UHCL's acclaimed studio art programs. It is also home to the Center for Autism and Developmental Disabilities (CADD), which supports research, trains current and future professionals and provides outreach services to families via confidential face-to-face and telehealth sessions.

The Student Services and Classroom Building houses business and education classrooms. A large part of the facility is dedicated to student-service functions, including the Dean of Students' office, the registrar, cashier, veterans services and financial aid offices.

=== UH-Clear Lake at Pearland ===
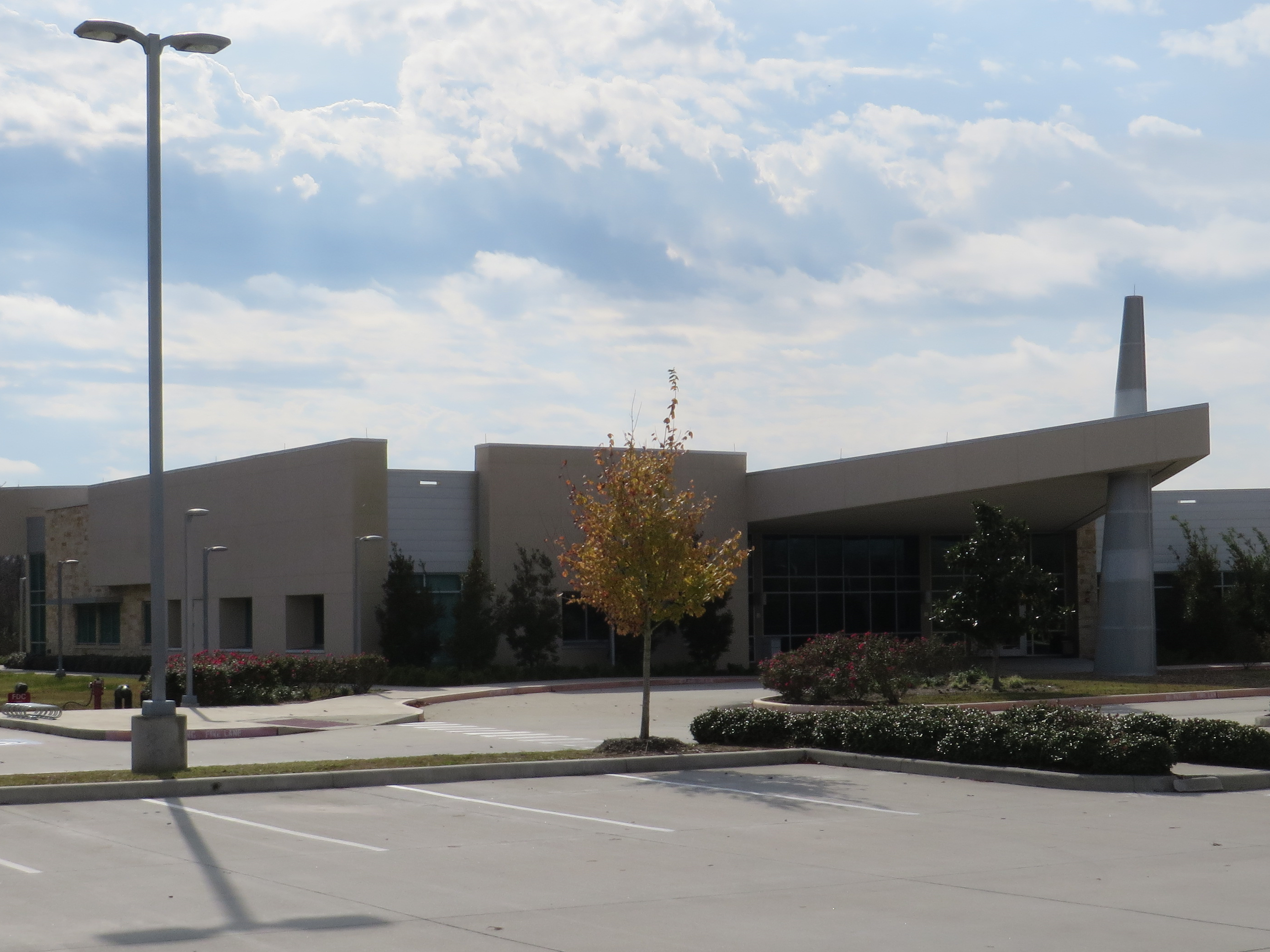
UHCL Pearland Campus

UHCL operates a branch campus situated on 40 acres of land in Pearland. City of Pearland officials and UHCL administrators began discussing opportunities to work together in 2004. The Texas Higher Education Coordinating Board approved the addition of the campus in 2007 and construction began in 2009. The 30,659 square foot building opened for classes in August 2010. Before the campus opened, a scholarship endowment was established to benefit Pearland residents who attend classes at the center.

The Pearland Economic Development Corporation leased some of the campus space for its new headquarters. The campus includes a library and a student lounge in addition to classroom and laboratory space. During its first semester, the campus enrolled over 500 students. A new addition, the Health Sciences and Classroom Building, opened in spring 2019, featuring simulation labs to support UHCL's Registered Nurse-Bachelor of Science (RN-to-BSN) degree program, as well as Pearland offices for UHCL's Center for Autism and Developmental Disabilities.

Upon its opening, the Pearland location offered undergraduate and graduate courses in education and several social science disciplines. Currently, the Pearland location offers seven undergraduate degrees, six graduate degrees and one doctoral degree. Degree options include business, behavioral science, education and nursing. Since 2017, UHCL at Pearland has hosted Alvin Community College's core classes, which are transferable to UHCL.

=== Texas Medical Center ===
Located at 2151 West Holcombe in Houston, Texas, UHCL's campus in the Texas Medical Center offers three business-oriented graduate degrees in health care administration—including a dual MHA/MBA program. Specialized trainings and certification programs are offered year-round for health care administrators and medical doctors in private practice.

== Academics ==
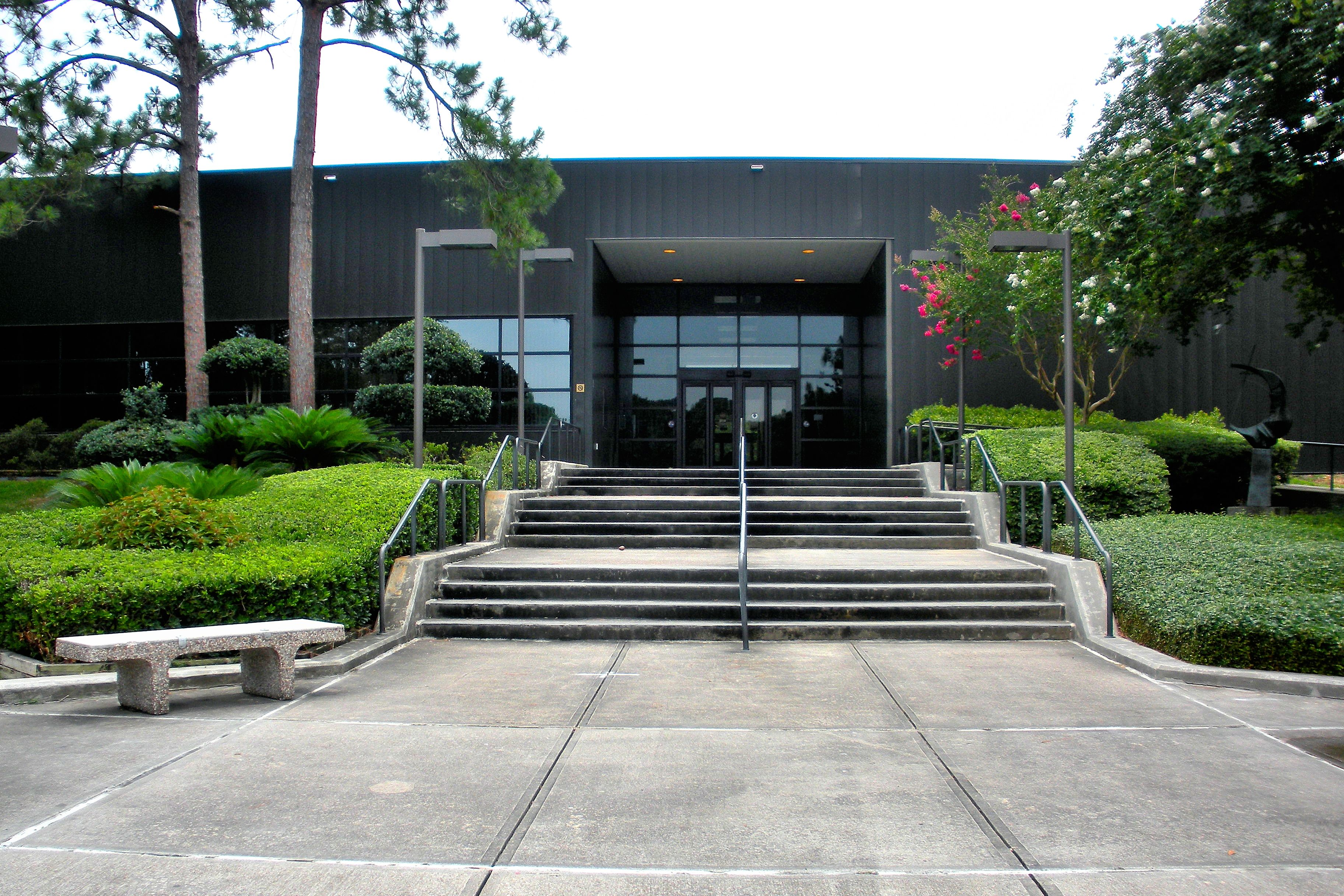
Delta Building

The University of Houston–Clear Lake (UHCL) is separately accredited, offers its own academic programs, and confers its own degrees. Students who graduate from UHCL will have diplomas under the name University of Houston–Clear Lake.

The university is organized into four academic colleges: the College of Business, the College of Education, the College of Human Sciences and Humanities, and the College of Science and Engineering. The College of Business has the largest undergraduate enrollment and awards the most bachelor's degrees annually.

UHCL awards the undergraduate degrees Bachelor of Arts, Bachelor of Science, Bachelor of Business Administration and Bachelor of Social Work (BSW). At the graduate level it awards the degrees Master of Arts, Master of Science, Master of Business Administration, Master of Healthcare Administration (MHA), Doctor of Psychology (PsyD), and Doctor of Education (EdD). The EdD program in Educational Leadership, initiated in January 2007, is the first doctoral degree program offered by the university.

UHCL is accredited by the Commission on Colleges of the Southern Association of Colleges and Schools. Many of the university's Schools and academic programs have individual accreditation through other governing bodies such as the National Council for Accreditation of Teacher Education (NCATE), the American Chemical Society (ACS), the American Association for Marriage and Family Therapy (AAMFT), and the Association to Advance Collegiate Schools of Business (AACSB).

== Notable alumni ==
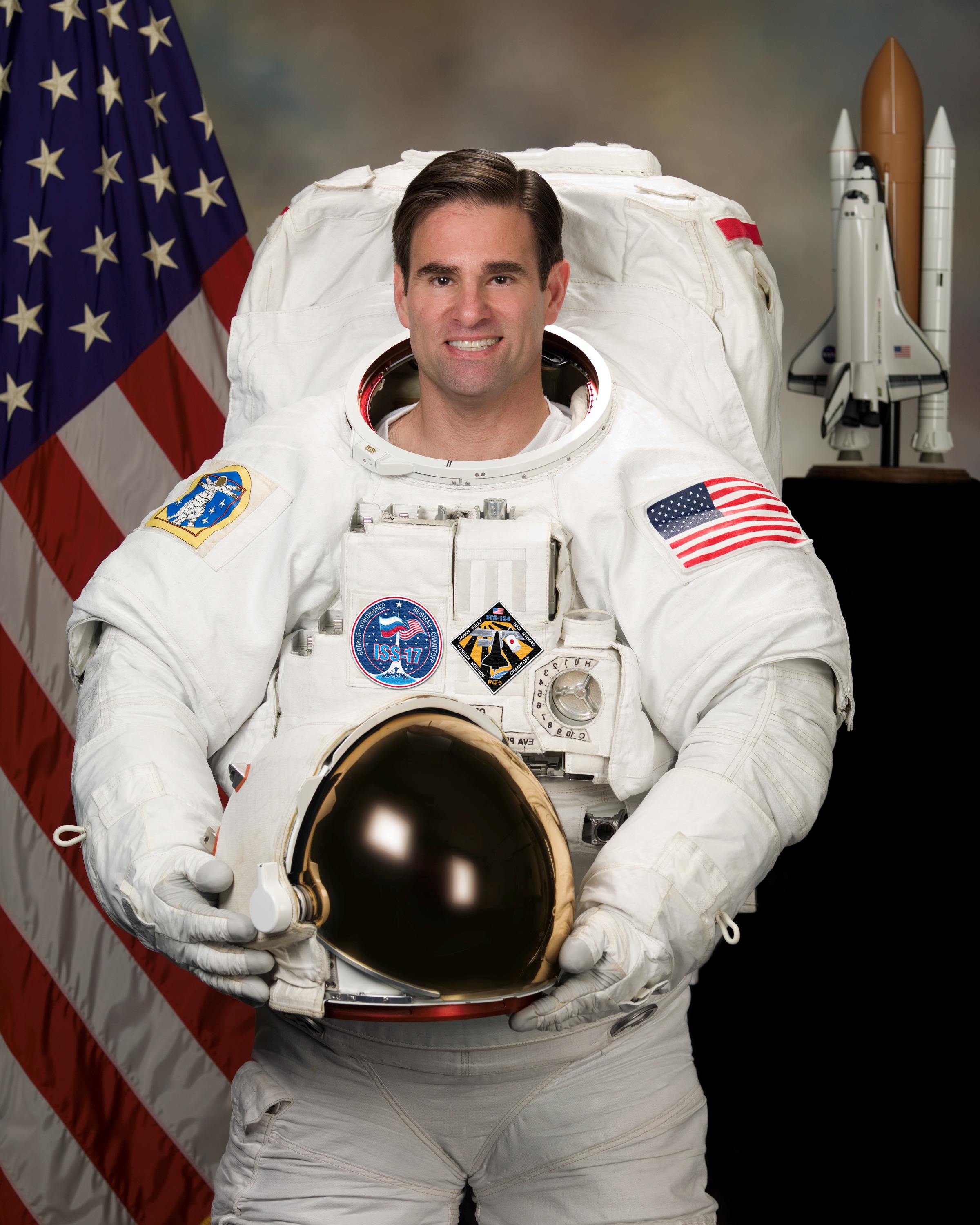
Gregory Chamitoff, astronaut

- Guion Bluford – first African-American astronaut
- Gregory Chamitoff – astronaut
- John E. Davis – Republican member of the Texas House of Representatives from Houston since 1999
- Kevin Eschenfelder – sportscaster
- Michael Fincke – astronaut
- Michael E. Fossum – astronaut
- Stephanie Guerrero – model and former Miss Texas USA 2004
- Gregory J. Harbaugh – astronaut
- Dean A. Hrbacek – attorney, politician, and former mayor of Sugar Land, Texas
- Kevin Kwan – best-selling author, Crazy Rich Asians, China Rich Girlfriend, Rich People Problems
- Lauren Lanning – Miss Texas USA 2006
- Bruce McCandless II – astronaut
- Charles McClelland – Houston Police Chief
- Richard Mastracchio – astronaut and engineer
- Lee Morin - astronaut
- John Muratore – professor of Aviation Systems at the University of Tennessee Space Institute and former NASA engineer
- Story Musgrave – physician and retired astronaut
- Angela Paxton — Senator, Texas Senate
- Randy Weber – U.S. Congressman from Texas
- Bruce Webster – software engineer, entrepreneur, and former game programmer
