= Andrew Davis Bruce =

United States Army general (1894–1969)

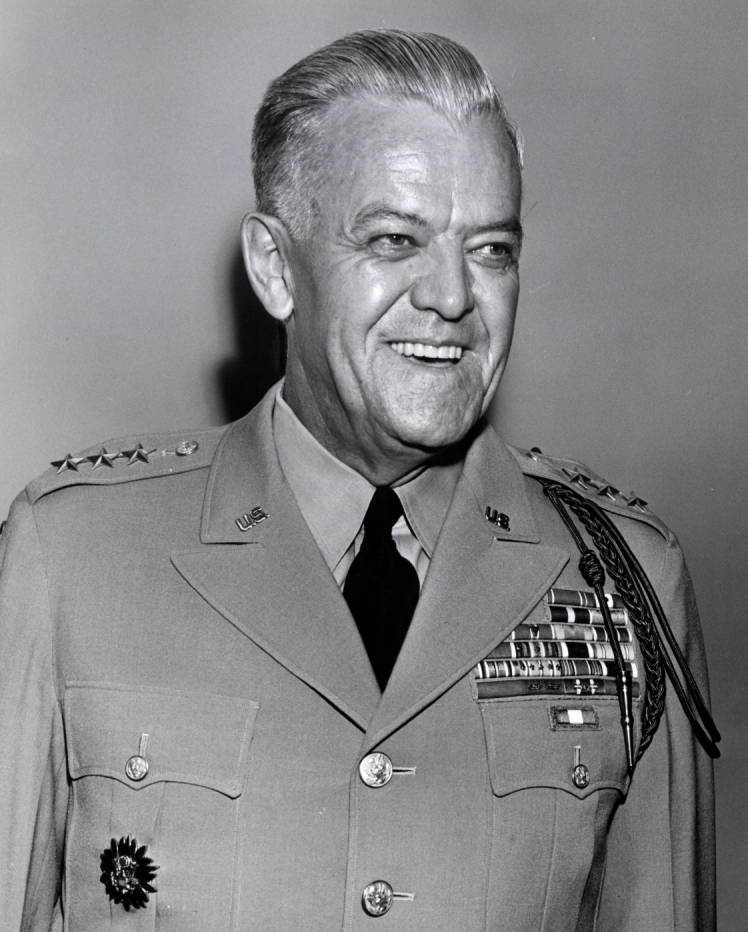
- Lieutenant General Andrew Davis Bruce, pictured here in 1954.

3rd President of the University of Houston
- In office 1954–1956
- Preceded by: Walter Kemmerer
- Succeeded by: Clanton W. Williams

Personal details
- Born: September 14, 1894 St. Louis, Missouri, United States
- Died: July 28, 1969 (aged 74) North Carolina, United States
- Resting place: Arlington National Cemetery, Virginia, United States
- Spouse: Roberta Bruce
- Children: 3
- Education: Texas A&M University
- Profession: Soldier (United States Army)
- Awards: Distinguished Service Cross; Army Distinguished Service Medal (2); Navy Distinguished Service Medal; Bronze Star; Legion of Merit; Air Medal; Purple Heart

Military service
- Allegiance: United States
- Branch/service: United States Army
- Years of service: 1917–1954
- Rank: Lieutenant General
- Unit: Infantry Branch
- Commands: 77th Infantry Division; 7th Infantry Division; United States Army Tank Destroyer Command; Armed Forces Staff College
- Battles/wars: World War I World War II

Lieutenant General Andrew Davis Bruce (September 14, 1894 – July 28, 1969) was an American academic and soldier who served as the third president of the University of Houston. He retired from the United States Army in 1954 as a lieutenant general after seeing action in both World War I and World War II and founding Fort Hood, Texas. Three countries, France, the Philippines, and the United States, awarded him service medals, including the Distinguished Service Cross, the U.S. Army's second highest military decoration. Bruce is interred in Arlington National Cemetery.

== Early years ==
Bruce was born on September 14, 1894, in St. Louis, Missouri, to John Logan Bruce and Martha Washington Smith. His family moved to Texas when he was a child. After finishing high school Bruce attended the Agricultural and Mechanical College of Texas, now known as Texas A&M University, where he was required to be a member of the Corps of Cadets and undergo military training. In 1916, Bruce earned a doctorate of laws from Texas A&M.

== Military service ==
=== World War I ===
Shortly after his graduation, the United States entered World War I. In June 1917 Bruce joined the United States Army as a second lieutenant in the Infantry Branch. He served in the First Officers Training Camp at Leon Springs, Texas. After completing his training he was sent to combat in France as part of the 2nd Infantry Division's 5th Machine Gun Battalion. He saw action in the trenches of the Western Front in the Troyon Sector near Verdun, in the Aisne Defensive operation near Chateau Thierry, the Aisne-Marne offensive at Soissons, the fighting at St. Mihiel, and the Meuse-Argonne Offensive at Blanc Mont. Following the signing of the Armistice with Germany on November 11, 1918, he moved with his division into Germany to be part of the occupation force. At the relatively young age of 24 Bruce achieved the temporary rank of lieutenant colonel. The government of France awarded him the Legion of Honor, three Croix de Guerre medals, and the fourragère.

Bruce was awarded the Distinguished Service Cross, the country's second highest award for valor in the face of the enemy, (second only to the Medal of Honor) in 1919. The citation read,

The Distinguished Service Cross is presented to Andrew D. Bruce, Major, U.S. Army, for extraordinary heroism in action near Vierzy, France, July 17–18, 1918, and near Blanc Mont October 3–4, 1918. On the night of July 17–18, Major Bruce made a personal reconnaissance ahead of his troops through heavy flanking machine-gun fire. He pushed forward to the outpost lines through heavy artillery and machine-gun fire to keep in touch with all his company. On October 3–4 he made a personal reconnaissance on the left flank of his division through heavy shell fire and continual sniping and gained information which enabled him to well place his battalion and cover an exposed flank.

=== Between the wars ===
In 1920, Bruce married Roberta Linnell Kennedy. The couple made their home in Bryan, Texas, near Texas A&M, and Bruce taught military science and tactics at Allen Academy. They had three children. For the next two decades Bruce continued to serve in the army. He served with the 33rd Infantry Regiment in Panama, participated in historical work at the U.S. Army War College and served on the general staff of the War Department revising textbooks on military doctrine. He also furthered his own knowledge of military tactics, attending the U.S. Army Infantry School, the U.S. Army Field Artillery School, the U.S. Army Command and General Staff School, the U.S. Army War College, and the Naval War College.

=== World War II ===
Following the American entry into World War II, due to the Japanese attack on Pearl Harbor on December 7, 1941, and the German declaration of war on the United States four days later, Bruce, promoted to the one-star general officer rank of brigadier general was assigned to organize a new tank destroyer center. He chose Killeen, Texas, for the new camp, and named it Fort Hood for General John Bell Hood.

On September 9, 1942, he was promoted to the two-star rank of major general. The following year, in May 1943, he assumed command of the 77th Infantry Division, an Army of the United States formation and one of the first divisions raised after the American entry into the war, composed almost entirely of draftees, taking over from Major General Roscoe B. Woodruff. He was awarded the Army Distinguished Service Medal for his role in organizing the tank destroyer center, with the medal's citation reading as follows:

The President of the United States of America, authorized by Act of Congress July 9, 1918, takes pleasure in presenting the Army Distinguished Service Medal to Major General Andrew Davis Bruce (ASN: 0-5857), United States Army, for exceptionally meritorious and distinguished services to the Government of the United States, in a duty of great responsibility in planning, organizing, establishing, and operating initially the Tank Destroyer Center, Camp Hood, Texas during World War II. His superior technical knowledge, untiring zeal and splendid judgment resulted in the organization and training of tank destroyer units whose tactical mission was not contemplated previously in the organization of our Army. He contributed materially to the development of tank destroyer tactics employed by our armed forces in all the theaters of operation. The singularly distinctive accomplishments of General Bruce and his dedicated contributions in the service of his country reflect the highest credit upon himself and the United States Army.

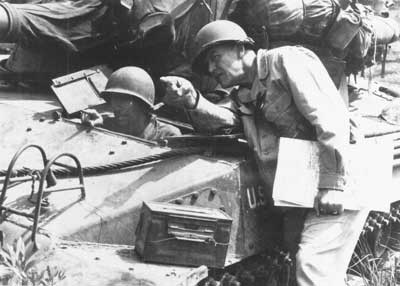
Major General Andrew Davis Bruce (standing), pictured sometime in 1944.

After training in the United States the division was sent overseas in March 1944. Under Bruce's leadership the 77th Division fought in the Pacific War, participating in campaigns in Guam, Leyte, and Ryukyu. During the fighting on Guam the 77th Division's chief of staff, Colonel Douglas C. McNair, son of Lieutenant General Lesley J. McNair, the commander of Army Ground Forces, was killed in action. It was also during the fighting on Guam that saw Bruce receive the Navy Distinguished Service Medal, the citation for which reads:

The President of the United States of America takes pleasure in presenting the Navy Distinguished Service Medal to Major General Andrew Davis Bruce (ASN: 0-5857), United States Army, for exceptionally meritorious and distinguished service in a position of great responsibility to the Government of the United States as Commanding General of the 77th Infantry Division during the attack and occupation of the Island of Guam from 21 July 1944 to 10 August 1944. General Bruce displayed exceptional ability and keen tactical judgment in directing the operations of his Division. His courage, determination, and outstanding leadership throughout contributed materially to the success of the entire operations and were in keeping with the highest traditions of the Armed Forces of the United States.

At Leyte, in the Philippines, the division was responsible for taking Palompon, the last main port the Japanese held on the island. During the ten-day battle for that area of the island, from December 21 through December 31, 1944, the division estimated that they had killed 5,779 Japanese soldiers and taken 29 prisoners, with only 17 Americans killed, 116 wounded, and 6 missing in action. For his service the government of the Philippines later awarded him the Philippine Legion of Honor, the Philippine Liberation Medal, and the Presidential Unit Citation.

On April 16, 1945, the 77th Division was ordered to seize the island of Ie Shima in the Ryukyu islands so that the U.S. Army could use the island's airfields to support assaults on Okinawa and other islands in Japan. During the six-day battle to secure the island, 4,706 Japanese soldiers and civilians were killed, while 172 Americans were killed, 902 were wounded, and 46 were missing. During the battle, famed war correspondent Ernie Pyle was killed by machine gun fire. Major General Bruce and his men buried Pyle on the island, later erecting a monument to him. Despite the fact that the Japanese had tried to destroy the airfields, army engineers were able to have all taxiways and runways fully operational by mid-May.

=== Post-World War II ===
After the surrender of Japan, Bruce served as the military governor of Hokkaidō. In 1946, he was transferred to be, briefly, commander of the 7th Infantry Division which was occupying Korea. He returned to the United States in October 1947, becoming deputy army commander of the Fourth Army stationed at Fort Sam Houston in Texas. His primary responsibilities were to assist with the training activities of the Reserve Officers' Training Corps (ROTC), National Guard and Organized Reserve Corps of five states.

Bruce became commandant of the Armed Forces Staff College in Norfolk, Virginia, in early July 1951 and was promoted to the three-star rank of lieutenant general on July 30, 1951. He retired from the U.S. Army on July 31, 1954.

Bruce's decorations during his long military career included the DSC, the Army DSM with oak leaf cluster, the Navy DSM, the Legion of Merit, the Bronze Star, an Air Medal, and the Purple Heart.

== University of Houston ==
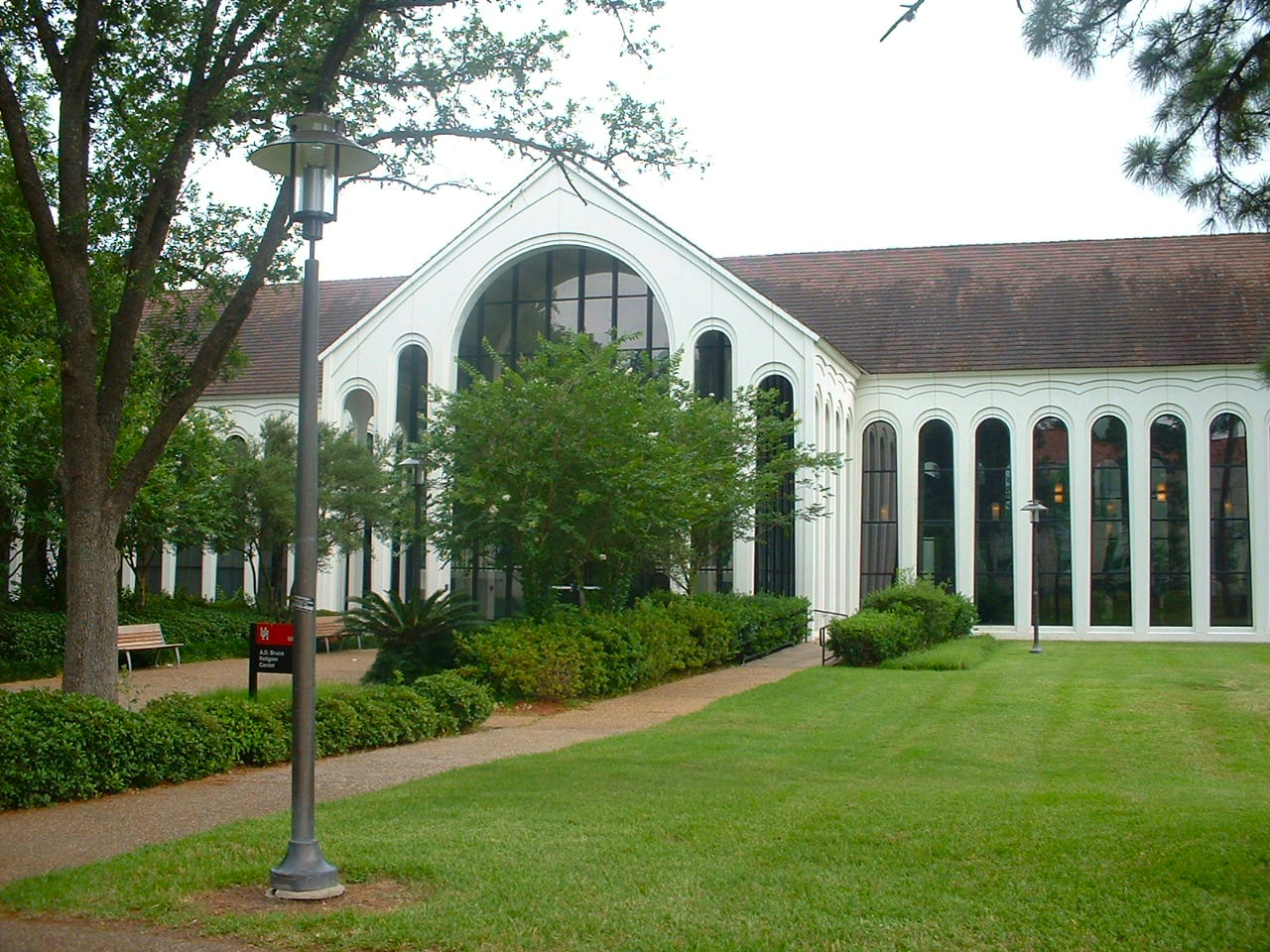
The A.D. Bruce Religion Center at the University of Houston was named after the former president.

Bruce became the third president of the University of Houston in Houston, Texas, on September 1, 1954, one month after retiring from military service. He succeeded interim president C. F. McElhinney. Shortly after arriving, Bruce noted that the university was missing something which he considered fundamental—a chapel for student use located on campus. He remarked to the Director of Religious Activities that if you "[e]xclude religion entirely from education...you have no foundation upon which to build moral character."

A year after he took office, Bruce began investigating whether there would be interest in building a religious center and chapel complex at the school. After several years of negotiations with the various religious denominations which had operated on and off campus, Bruce engineered a consensus that the university would build a center based on the model of the Armed Forces Base Chapel. The new religious center would have a single chapel which would be shared by all of the groups, and office space for each group. The center opened in 1965 and was named for Bruce.

In 1956, Bruce was appointed the first chancellor of the university, in addition to his duties as president. The following year he organized a Board of Governors, consisting of the Board of Regents and other prominent Houstonians. In November 1959 this governing board sought state support for the university, which had grown rapidly under Bruce's leadership. During Bruce's tenure, the "University's curriculum standards and faculty both improved and the University became better-known." He retired from chancellorship in 1961.

== Later years ==
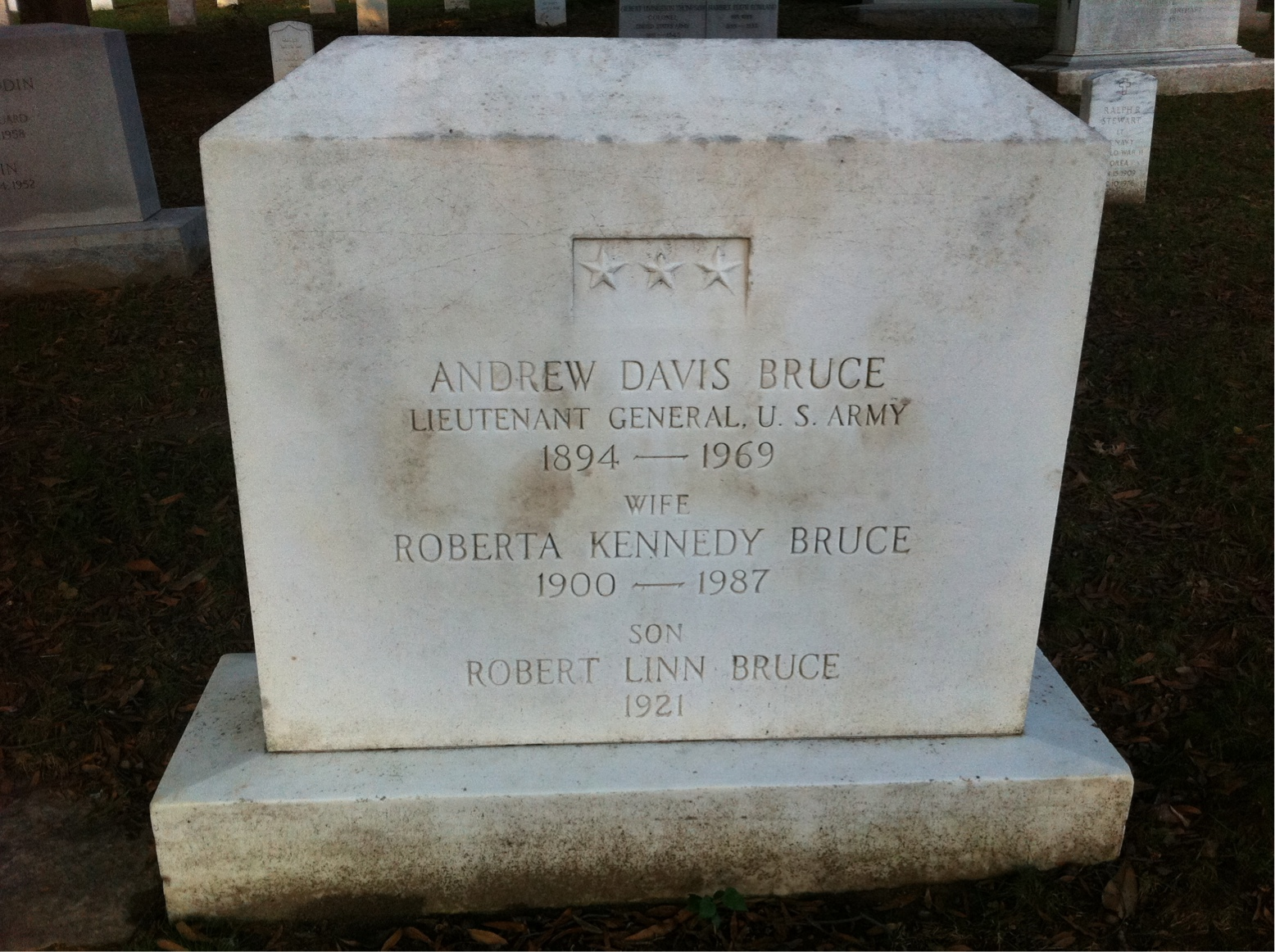
The grave of Lieutenant General Andrew Davis Bruce at Arlington National Cemetery.

Bruce was president of the Houston Chamber of Commerce and was also a Mason and a Shriner.

Bruce retired from academia during the 1960–1961 school year and moved to North Carolina. He died on July 28, 1969, and is buried at Arlington National Cemetery. In 1972, the state of Texas erected a historical marker in his memory in Killeen at Fort Hood. In addition, Interstate 35 through Temple was named "General Bruce Drive".

Military offices
Preceded by Roscoe B. Woodruff	Commanding General 77th Infantry Division; 1943–1946	Succeeded by Post deactivated
Preceded by Joseph L. Ready	Commanding General 7th Infantry Division; March–June 1946	Succeeded by Leroy J. Stewart
Preceded by John L. Hall Jr.	Commandant of the Armed Forces Staff College; 1951–1954	Succeeded by David M. Schlatter
