= Christopher B. Roberts =

American academic

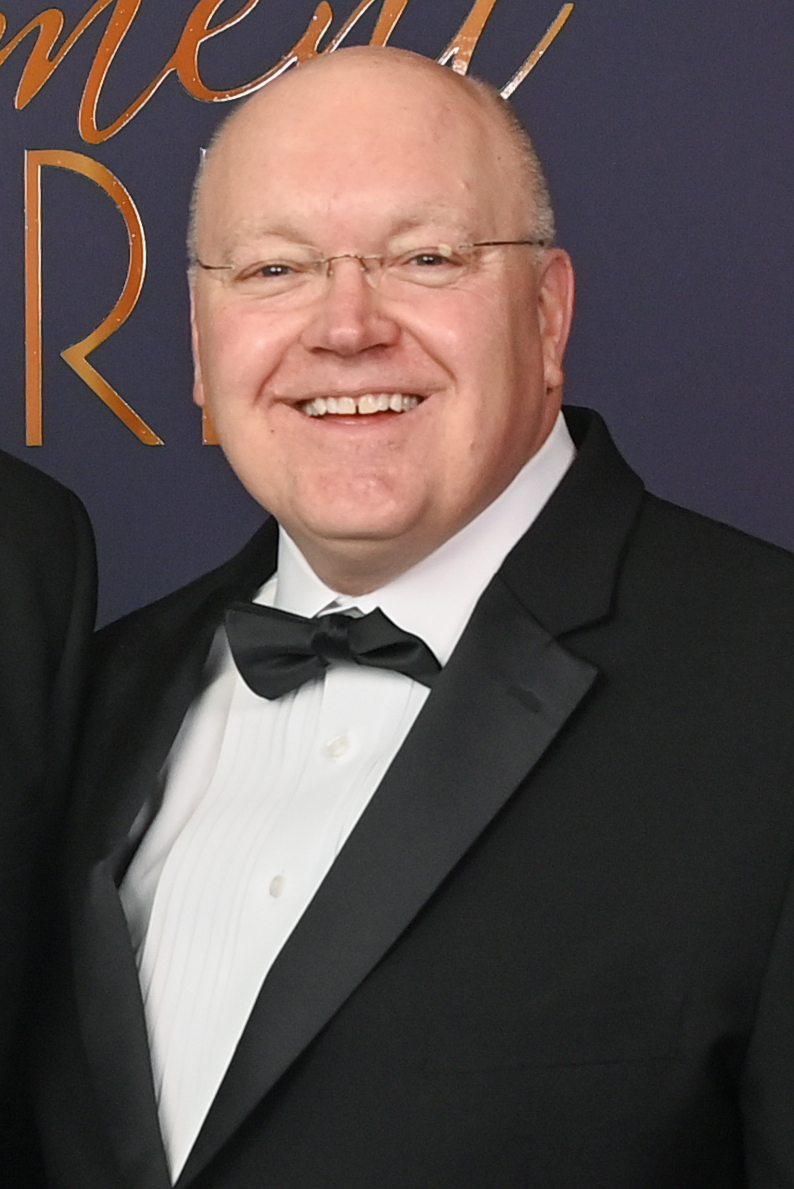
- Roberts in 2025

21st President of Auburn University
- Incumbent
- Assumed office May 16, 2022
- Preceded by: Jay Gogue

Personal details
- Spouse: Tracy Roberts (m. 1998)
- Children: 2
- Education: University of Missouri (B.S.); University of Notre Dame (M.S.),(Ph.D.)
- Profession: Academic administrator

Christopher B. Roberts is the 21st and current president of Auburn University. He is a graduate of the University of Missouri and the University of Notre Dame.

== Early life and education ==
Roberts grew up in the small town of Ste. Genevieve, Missouri, and is the son of a music store owner. He graduated from Valle Catholic High School.

Roberts graduated from the University of Missouri in 1990 with a Bachelor of Science in chemical engineering and the University of Notre Dame with a Master of Science (1992) and Ph.D. (1994) in chemical engineering.

== Career ==
He joined the Auburn University faculty in 1994 upon graduating and became an assistant professor in its department of chemical engineering before becoming the department chair in 2003. He was named the dean of engineering in 2012.

On February 4, 2022, Roberts was announced as the next president of Auburn University, succeeding Jay Gogue. He took office on May 16 of the same year. He has stated that his number one goal is to "maintain Auburn’s student-centered experience."

== Controversy ==
On September 17, 2025, Roberts released a letter on Facebook saying he fired an unknown number of employees for "insensitive" social media posts regarding the murder of Charlie Kirk. These firings occurred after U.S. Sen. Tommy Tuberville, R-Alabama, demanded the firing of educators who 'mocked' the death of Charlie Kirk. It remains unclear the nature of the social media posts that led to firings or if the employees were members of (non-teaching) staff or educators. Roberts has still not released details of the posts or who was fired, raising questions about the exact rationale behind each firing. At least two lawsuits have been filed against Auburn University by former employees, one a former lecturer and another a landscaper, claiming infringement of their first Amendment rights.
