= Arthur K. Smith =

American academic (born 1937)

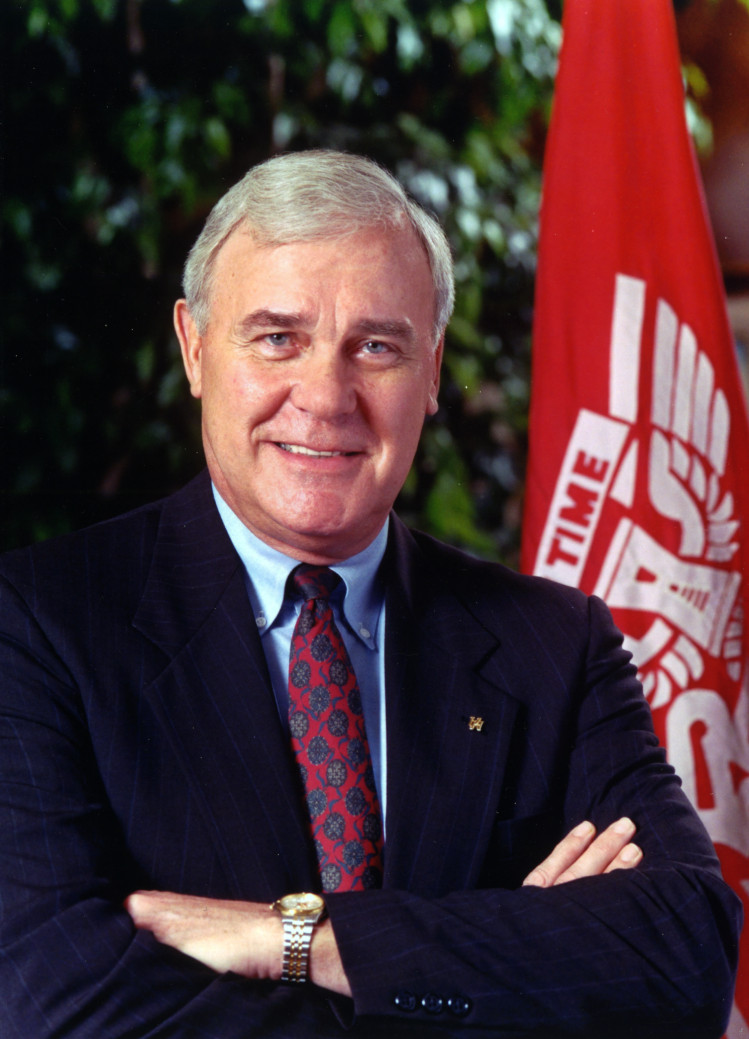

6th Chancellor of the University of Houston System
- In office 1997–2003
- Preceded by: William P. Hobby Jr.
- Succeeded by: Jay Gogue

11th President of the University of Houston
- In office 1997–2003
- Preceded by: Glenn A. Goerke
- Succeeded by: Jay Gogue

12th President of the University of Utah
- In office 1991–1997
- Preceded by: Chase N. Peterson
- Succeeded by: J. Bernard Machen

Personal details
- Born: August 15, 1937 (age 89) Derry, New Hampshire
- Education: United States Naval Academy; University of New Hampshire; Cornell University

Academic work
- Discipline: Political science
- Sub-discipline: Latin American politics
- Institutions: Binghamton University; University of South Carolina; University of Utah; University of Houston

Arthur K. Smith (born August 15, 1937) is an American academic. He served as the president of the University of Utah from 1991 to 1997. At the time of his appointment, he was the first non-member of the Church of Jesus Christ of Latter-day Saints to hold the position. He was previously the vice president for academic affairs, provost and acting president of the University of South Carolina, and vice president of administration of the Binghamton University.

Smith is a graduate of the United States Naval Academy (1959). He later attended the University of New Hampshire and Cornell University and earned a master's degree in comparative and international politics, as well as a Doctor of Philosophy. His first teaching job was as a professor of political science at Binghamton. After serving as the president of the University of Utah, Smith then served a dual role as chancellor of the University of Houston System and president of the University of Houston from 1997 to 2003, and later became professor of Latin American politics at the University of Houston.

Academic offices
Preceded by Chase N. Peterson	President of the University of Utah; 1991 – 1997	Succeeded by J. Bernard Machen
Preceded by William P. Hobby Jr.	Chancellor of the University of Houston System; 1997 – 2003	Succeeded by Jay Gogue
Preceded by Glenn Goerke	President of the University of Houston; 1997 – 2003	Succeeded by Jay Gogue
