= Alexander F. Schilt =

American academic administrator (1941–2025)

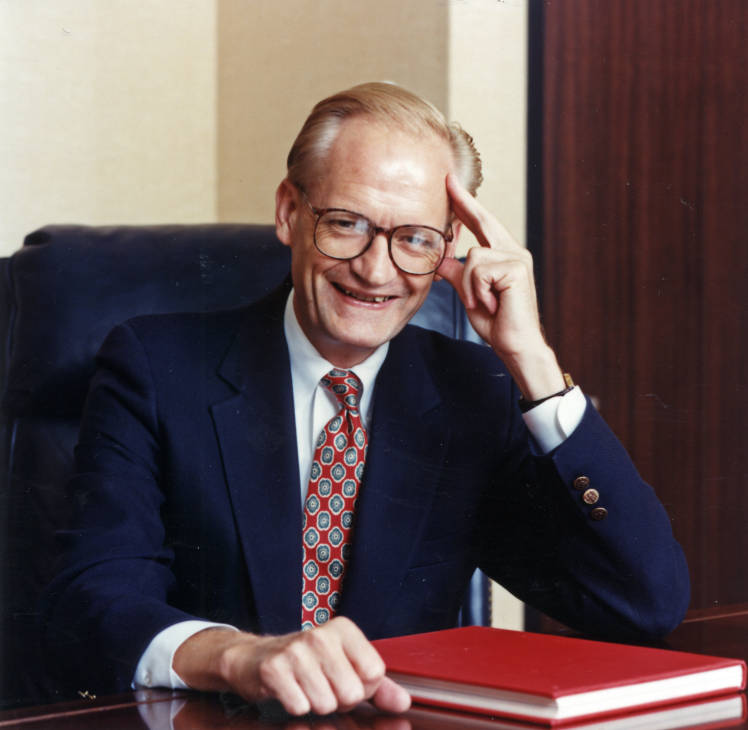
- Schilt as UH System Chancellor

4th Chancellor of the University of Houston System
- In office October 1, 1989 – March 1996

22nd President of Eastern Washington University
- In office August 17, 1987 – September 1, 1989

2nd Chancellor of the University of Houston–Downtown
- In office July 15, 1980 – May 1987

1st Chancellor of the Indiana University East
- In office September 10, 1978 – June 1980

Personal details
- Born: March 4, 1941 Cheyenne, Wyoming, U.S.
- Died: July 9, 2025 (aged 84) Houston, Texas, U.S.
- Education: University of Wyoming (BA, history); Arizona State University (MA, psychology); Arizona State University (PhD, psychology)

Alexander Frank Schilt (March 4, 1941 – July 9, 2025) was an American academic and higher education administrator. He served as the first chancellor of Indiana University East, the second president of the University of Houston–Downtown, the 22nd president of Eastern Washington University, and the fourth chancellor of the University of Houston System.

== Biography ==
Schilt was born in Cheyenne, Wyoming, U.S. on March 4, 1941. His parents were Louis F. and Mary Alice (née Linton) Schilt, and he had two siblings, a brother Louie and a sister RoseMary. His father was an agricultural extension agent for Laramie County, Wyoming. The family moved to Laramie, Wyoming, in 1946 when Schilt's father was appointed director of the state extension service of the University of Wyoming.

After graduating from Laramie High School, Schilt obtained his bachelor's degree in history from the University of Wyoming in 1964. He then enrolled at Arizona State University, where he earned a master's degree in 1966 and a doctorate in 1969 in the field of psychology. From 1965 to 1969 at Arizona State, he also served as assistant dean of students. He served as assistant director of financial aid during the 1969—1970 academic year.

In 1970, Schilt was named dean of student services at Indiana University Southeast in New Albany, Indiana. He was appointed dean of the campus of Indiana University East in Richmond, Indiana, in February 1976 and chancellor of the campus in September 1978.

Schilt was named chancellor of the University of Houston–Downtown, and assumed his duties on July 15, 1980. He was also appointed a professor of psychology at the school. He was a finalist for the presidency of the University of Houston system in 1980, but was not chosen.

In March 1987, Schilt was appointed president of Eastern Washington University. He assumed his duties on August 17, 1987, with a three-year contract.

On August 31, 1989, Schilt was named chancellor of the four-campus University of Houston System. He had not sought the job, but his name was submitted for consideration by regents of the university. He assumed the position on October 1, 1989. In early 1996, Schilt accepted a buyout of his contract as chancellor, which still had two years to run. He received $373,516 in lieu of salary and benefits. His was the largest buyout of any Texas public higher education administrator in the past two and a half years.

After resigning as chancellor, Schilt remained a professor in the University of Houston College of Education, retiring in 2018.

=== Personal life and death ===
Schilt was married and had two daughters, Paige and Kristen. He and his wife later divorced. He enjoyed long-distance running and fly fishing, and was an active supporter of local ballet and symphony orchestras.

Schilt died on July 9, 2025 at the age of 84.

== Accolades ==
Schilt was awarded the Order of the Aztec Eagle by the government of Mexico in September 1994.

Academic offices
Preceded by H.G. Frederickson	President of Eastern Washington University; 1987–1989	Succeeded by Marshall E. Drummond
Preceded by J. Don Boney	President of the University of Houston–Downtown; 1980–1987	Succeeded by Manuel T. Pacheco
Preceded by None	Chancellor of Indiana University East; 1978–1980	Succeeded by Glenn A. Goerke
