= Glenn Goerke =

American academic administrator (1931–2015)

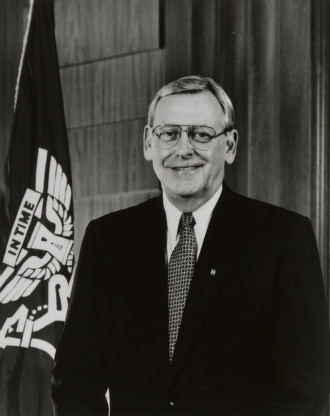
- Born: May 15, 1931; Lincoln Park, Michigan
- Died: November 13, 2015 (aged 84); Wolfeboro, New Hampshire
- Occupation: Academic administrator

Glenn Allan Goerke (May 15, 1931 – November 13, 2015) was an American academic who was President/Chancellor of the University of Houston, the University of Houston–Clear Lake, the University of Houston–Victoria, and Indiana University East. Goerke also served as an interim chancellor of the University of Houston System. He held an undergraduate degree from Eastern Michigan University, and a doctorate from Michigan State University.

Academic offices
Preceded by James H. Pickering	President of the University of Houston; 1995–1997	Succeeded by Arthur K. Smith
Preceded by Thomas M. Stauffer	President of the University of Houston–Clear Lake; 1991–1995	Succeeded by William A. Staples
Preceded by Martha K. Piper	President of the University of Houston–Victoria; 1986–1991	Succeeded by Don N. Smith
Preceded by Alexander F. Schilt	Chancellor of Indiana University East; 1981–1986	Succeeded by Charlie Nelms
