= Edison E. Oberholtzer =

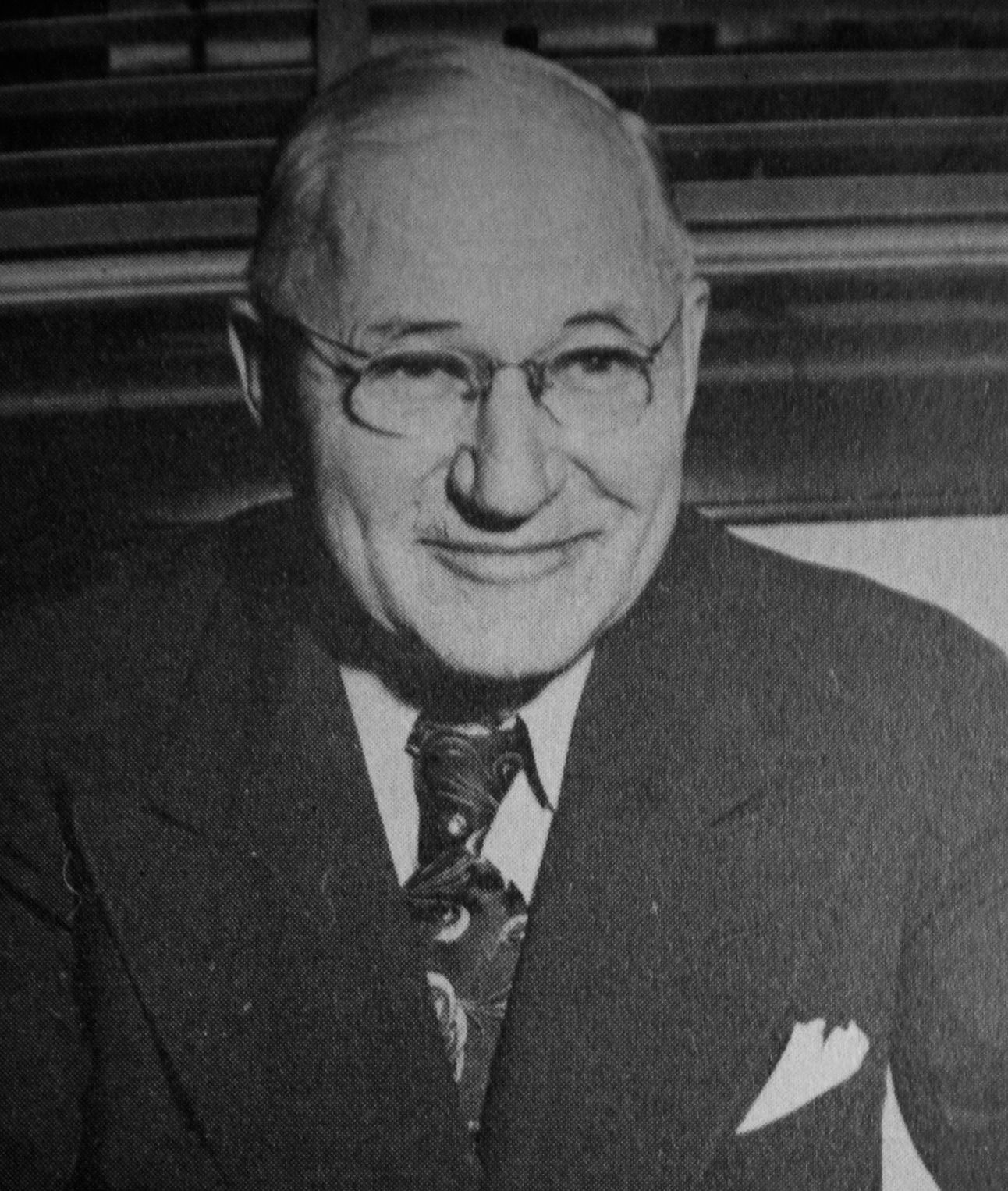

1st President of the University of Houston
- In office 1927–1950
- Preceded by: Position established
- Succeeded by: Walter William Kemmerer

Personal details
- Born: May 6, 1880 Patricksburg, Indiana, U.S.
- Died: June 18, 1954 (aged 74) Houston, Texas, U.S.
- Spouse: Myrtle May Barr
- Education: Indiana State Normal School; University of Chicago
- Profession: Educator

Edison Ellsworth Oberholtzer (May 6, 1880 – June 18, 1954) was the first president of the University of Houston. Oberholtzer obtained his undergraduate education at Westfield College in Westfield, Illinois and Indiana State Normal School (now known as Indiana State University). In 1915, he received his Master of Arts degree from the University of Chicago. Prior to founding the University of Houston, Oberholtzer was a teacher and administrator for schools in Indiana before eventually becoming a superintendent in Tulsa, Oklahoma and then Houston, Texas.

== Early life ==
Edison Oberholtzer was born May 6, 1880, in Patricksburg, Indiana to Augustus and Mary Anne Oberholtzer née Collins. He was the eleventh of their 12 children. He graduated from Clay City High School in Clay City, Indiana in 1895. Edison married Myrtle May Barr on March 26, 1901, and eventually had three children, Kenneth, Esther and Edison Jr.

In March 1925, his niece Madge Oberholtzer—daughter of his older brother George—was kidnapped, tortured and raped by D.C. Stephenson, Grand Dragon of the Indiana Ku Klux Klan. Her deathbed statement was sufficient to convict Stephenson of second degree murder in one of the most sensational cases in American history.

== Career ==
Oberholtzer began his career in education as a teacher and administrator for small schools in Indiana from 1898 through 1903. From 1906 through 1911, Oberholtzer was a supervising principal in Terre Haute, Indiana, and superintendent of schools in Clinton, Indiana. In 1913, he became a superintendent in Tulsa, Oklahoma, and served in that post until 1923 when he left to become superintendent of the Houston Independent School District in Houston, Texas. Oberholtzer served as superintendent for H.I.S.D. from April 7, 1924, until 1945.

=== University of Houston ===
In 1927, Edison Oberholtzer founded the precursor to the University of Houston, Houston Junior College. He served as president of the university until 1950, when he retired. During his tenure, Oberholtzer enlisted the help of philanthropist Hugh Roy Cullen as a large donor and supporter to the university.

== Death ==
Oberholtzer died in Houston on June 18, 1954, and was buried in Forest Park Abbey Mausoleum in Houston, Texas. His widow died on December 24, 1959, in San Bernardino, California.
