= Jay Gogue =

American university administrator, born 1947

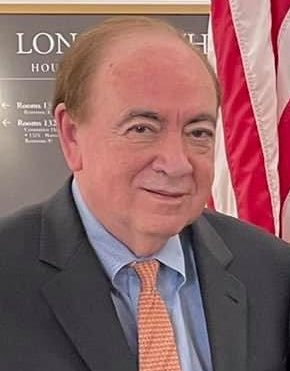
- Gogue in 2021

Chancellor of New Mexico State University
- Acting
- Assumed office April 7, 2023
- Preceded by: Dan Arvizu

20th President of Auburn University
- In office 2019–2022
- Preceded by: Steven Leath
- Succeeded by: Christopher B. Roberts
- In office 2007–2017
- Preceded by: Edward R. Richardson
- Succeeded by: Steven Leath

7th Chancellor of the University of Houston System
- In office 2003–2007
- Preceded by: Arthur K. Smith
- Succeeded by: Renu Khator

Personal details
- Born: 1947 (age 78–79) Waycross, Georgia, U.S.
- Spouse: Susie Gogue
- Education: Auburn University (BS, MS); Michigan State University (PhD)

Academic background
- Thesis: Chrysanthemum stem girdling due to chemical pinching agents and an improved tissue preparation technique for different microscopes (1973)

Academic work
- Discipline: horticulture
- Institutions: National Park Service; Clemson University; Utah State University; University of Houston; Auburn University; New Mexico State University

George Jay Gogue (/ɡuːʒ/ GOOZH; born 1947) is an American educator and 20th President of Auburn University, a position he held from 2007 until his retirement in July 2017 and again in 2019 until 2022, before taking the position of Chancellor of New Mexico State University in 2023.

== Biography ==
Jay Gogue was born in Waycross, Georgia, U.S. He graduated from Auburn University with a bachelor's degree in 1969, and a Master's degree in 1971. In 1973, he received a PhD in horticulture from Michigan State University.

From 1973 to 1976, he worked for the National Park Service. He also worked as a U.S. army reserve officer. In 1986, he was appointed as associate director of the Office of University Research at Clemson University in South Carolina. He also was vice-president for research and vice-president and vice-provost for agriculture and natural resources at Clemson from 1988 to 1995. From 1995 to 2000, he was Provost of Utah State University. He was President of New Mexico State University from 2000 to 2003. He also had a dual role as chancellor of the University of Houston System and president of the University of Houston from 2003 to 2007. From 2007 to July 2017, he was president of Auburn University.

Gogue's annual salary in 2013 was $2.5 million, making him the second-highest paid president of a public college in America.

In October 2012 Gogue was elected to the Alabama Academy of Honor by its members.
