= Cullen Performance Hall =

Concert hall in Houston, Texas, US

Coordinates: 29.7203°N 95.3431°W

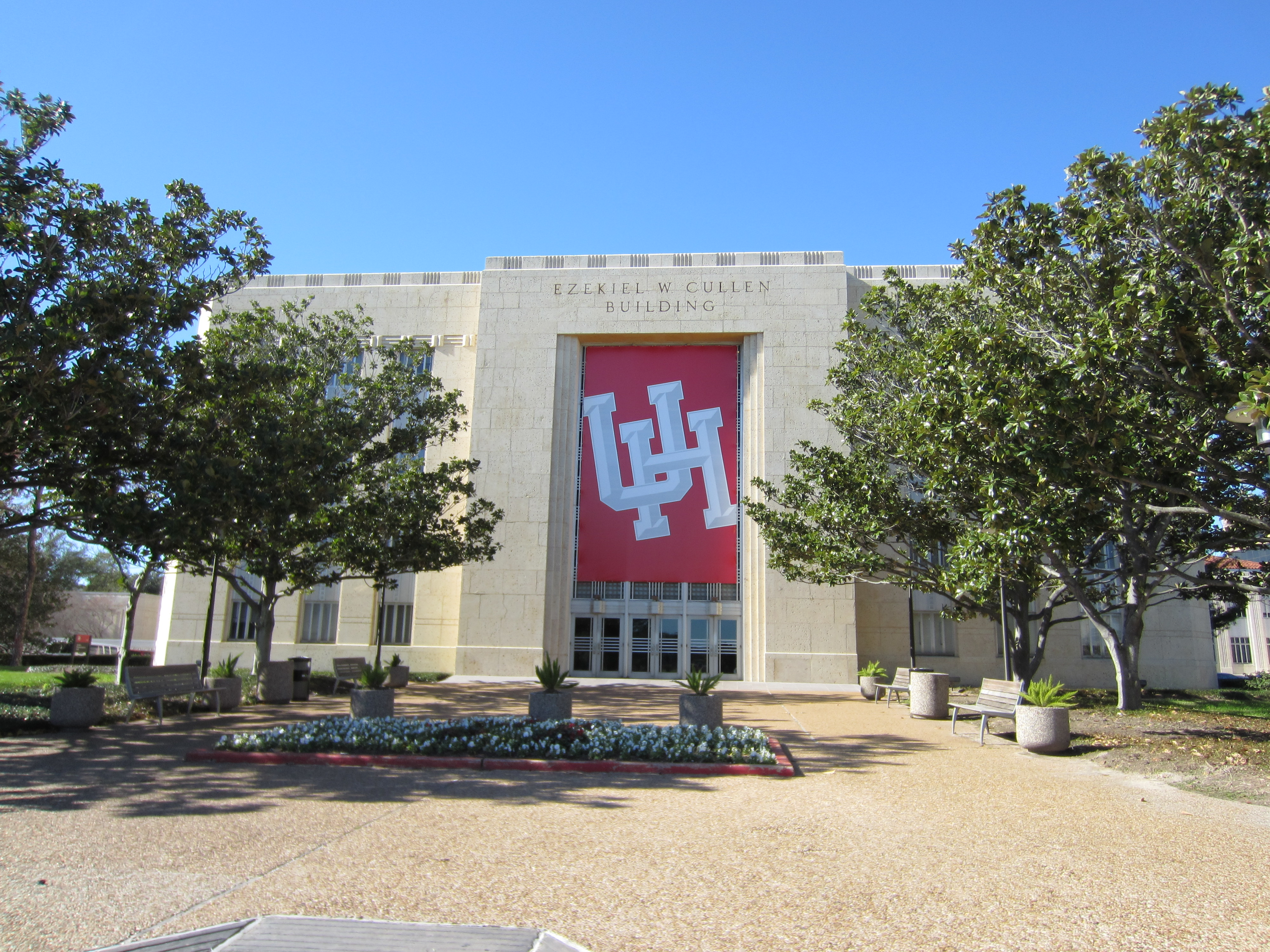
- Front entrance to Cullen Performance Hall
- Interactive map of Cullen Performance Hall
- Location: 4800 Calhoun Road; Houston, Texas; United States
- Owner: University of Houston
- Seating type: Reserved
- Capacity: 1,544
- Type: Proscenium theatre

Construction
- Opened: October 31, 1950
- Renovated: 1988
- Cost: $5.5 million USD

Website
- Cullen Performance Hall

Cullen Performance Hall is a concert hall located on the campus of the University of Houston in Houston, Texas. The hall, comprising the eastern half of the E. Cullen Building, was named in honor of Ezekiel W. Cullen, a former congressman for the Republic of Texas. The facility seats 1,544, and hosts music, opera, dance, theatrical events, and public lectures. Opening in 1950, the facility was designed by Alfred C. Finn.

== History ==
On March 21, 1945, the Ezekiel W. Cullen Building along with Cullen Performance Hall was announced. Construction of Cullen Performance Hall was part of a large expansion to the University of Houston's permanent buildings on campus that took place starting on May 10, 1948. The hall originally sat 1,680, and was intended to host similar events as the Houston Music Hall which was the main music venue for the city at the time. The hall was named in honor of Ezekiel W. Cullen, a congressman for the Republic of Texas, and the grandfather of then University of Houston Regent Hugh Roy Cullen who was the principal donor to the project.

The university hired native Houston architect Alfred C. Finn to design the building. In order to give the building a classical look, Finn designed the building with long wings and regularly spaced pilasters.

The dedication of the Cullen Performance Hall was held in conjunction with the Ezekiel W. Cullen Building on Halloween of 1950. For the dedication, conductor Efrem Kurtz directed the Houston Symphony Orchestra, and H.R. Cullen gave a speech.

In 1988, the facility received complete renovations.

== Past events ==
=== Music ===
Artists who have appeared at Cullen Performance Hall include Depeche Mode, The Smiths, Los Lobos, Tori Amos, Dead Can Dance, Tracy Chapman, Kronos Quartet, Muse (band), Djavan, Rick Braun, Jonathan Butler, Richard Elliot, Peter White, Cyndi Lauper, The Clash, and the Ramones.

=== Lectures ===
Rapper and political activist Chuck D spoke at a public lecture at Cullen Performance Hall in 2006. Filmmaker Charles Burnett discussed his 1978 film Killer of Sheep there in 2008, while Spike Lee spoke there in 2004. Nobel laureates James D. Watson and Eric Kandel lectured at the hall in 2007, and were moderated by Ferid Murad. Also in 2007, inventor and futurist Raymond Kurzweil presented UH's 2007 Farfel Distinguished Lecture at the location. Academic scholar Cornel West lectured on race relations as a guest of the university's Graduate College of Social Work in 2005.

=== Other ===
ESPN's College GameDay broadcast from outside of the Cullen Performance Hall when they came to the University of Houston campus to cover the #8 Houston team compete against SMU from November 18–19, 2011.
