= Philip Guthrie Hoffman =

American academic (1915–2008)

Philip G. Hoffman
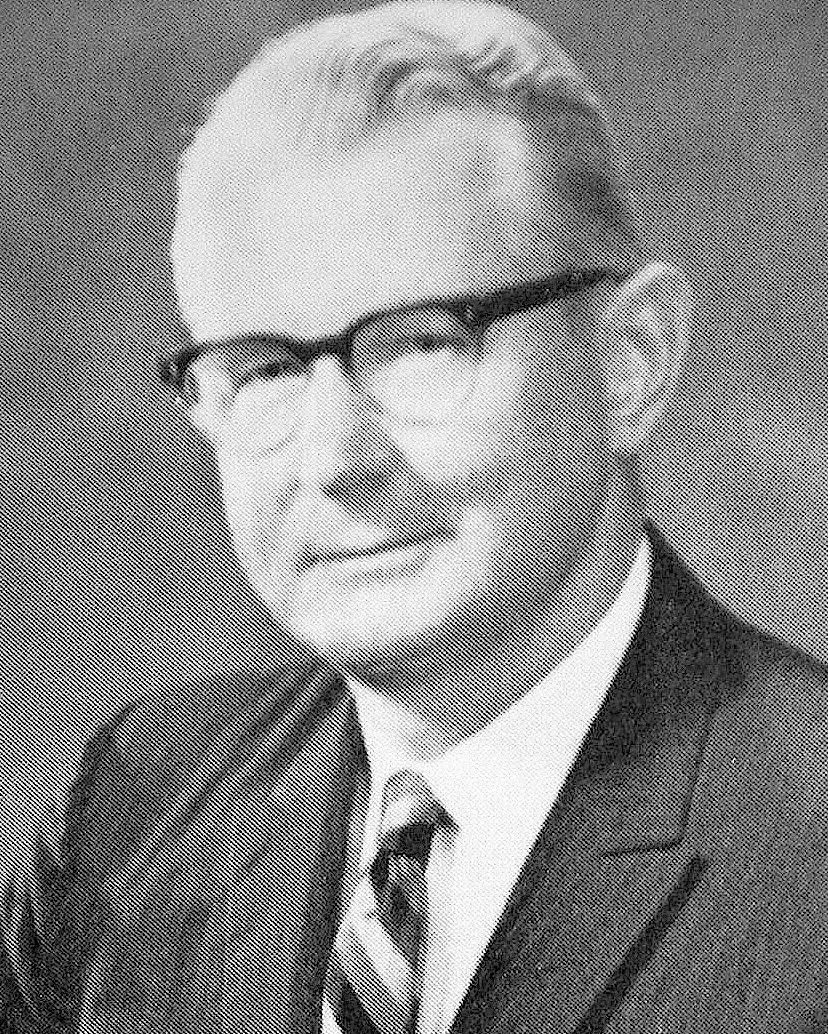
- Hoffman, ca. 1963

1st Chancellor of the University of Houston System
- In office 1977–1979
- Succeeded by: Charles E. Bishop

5th President of the University of Houston
- In office 1961–1977
- Preceded by: Clanton W. Williams
- Succeeded by: Barry Munitz

Personal details
- Born: 6 August 1915 Kobe, Hyōgo Prefecture, Japan
- Died: 29 October 2008 (aged 93) Houston, Texas
- Spouse: Mary Harding
- Children: Mary Victoria Cobb; Ruth Ann Cabler; Jeanne Camp; Philip G. Hoffman, Jr.
- Education: Pacific Union College; University of Southern California; Ohio State University
- Profession: Professor
- Website: UH Office of the President

Philip Guthrie Hoffman (6 August 1915 – 29 October 2008) was the fifth president of the University of Houston, and the first chancellor of the University of Houston System. While at the university, he was instrumental in obtaining state affiliation, transitioning to a racially integrated status, and expanding enrollment in multiple locations. Hoffman also served as president of the Texas Medical Center. Prior to his appointment as president of UH, he was a professor and administrator for several universities.

== Early life ==
Hoffman was born in 1915 in Kobe, Hyōgo Prefecture, Japan to Benjamin Philip Hoffman and Florence Guthrie Hoffman who were serving as missionaries there. The family moved to Oregon when he was five. Hoffman received a BBA from Pacific Union College in 1938, and a Master's degree in History from the University of Southern California in 1942. He then served in the United States Navy during World War II as an intelligence officer.

== Career ==
=== From professor to administrator ===
After the war, Hoffman earned his Doctorate in History from Ohio State University in 1948. During and after his graduate work at Ohio State, he worked as a professor at the university until 1949. He then went to the University of Alabama, where he served as an associate and assistant professor until 1953. Until 1956, Hoffman was first vice-dean and then dean of the general extension division for the Oregon State System of Higher Education (now known as the Oregon University System).

=== University of Houston involvement ===
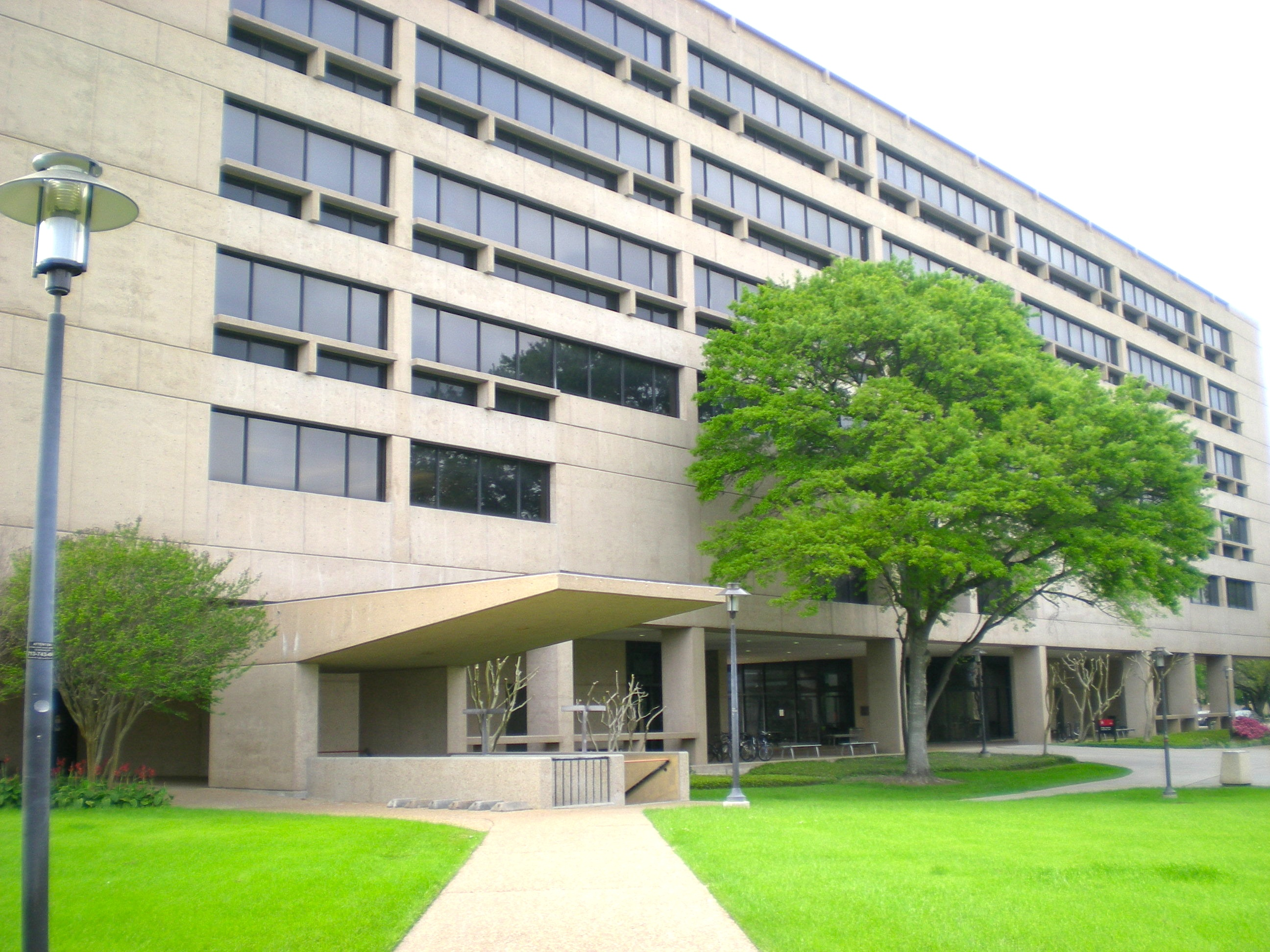
The Philip Guthrie Hoffman Hall at the University of Houston was named after the former president

In 1957, he came to the University of Houston as vice-president and dean of faculties. He served in this capacity until September 1961 when he succeeded Clanton W. Williams as the president of the university. During his time as president, Hoffman helped to found the University of Houston System. He became the system's first chancellor upon resigning from position of president of UH. He remained chancellor of the system until his retirement in 1979. In 1980, UH dedicated the on-campus Philip Guthrie Hoffman Hall in his honor, and upon his death in 2008, President Renu Khator named October 31, "Philip G. Hoffman Day".

=== Post-UH years ===
Upon retirement from the University of Houston System, Hoffman served as President of the Texas Medical Center from 1981 until 1984.

== Personal life and death ==
Hoffman died 29 October 2008 in his Houston home. He is survived by his wife, Mary Hoffman (a niece of U.S. President Warren G. Harding); three daughters, Mary Victoria, Ruth Ann, and Jeanne; his grandchildren John, Guy, Elizabeth, Benjamin, Melanie, and Mary; and his great-grand child Mary Mae.
