= William A. Staples =

William A. Staples served as the fourth president of the University of Houston–Clear Lake. He earned a bachelor's degree from Drake University (BBA 1970), a master's degree from the University of Iowa (MBA 1972), and a doctorate in business administration from the University of Houston (PhD 1977). Prior to becoming president, he served the UHCL's School of Business as coordinator, program director, associate dean, and dean.

Academic offices
Preceded by Glenn A. Goerke	President of the University of Houston–Clear Lake; 1995–2017	Succeeded by Ira K. Blake
