= Renu Khator =

Indian-American academic

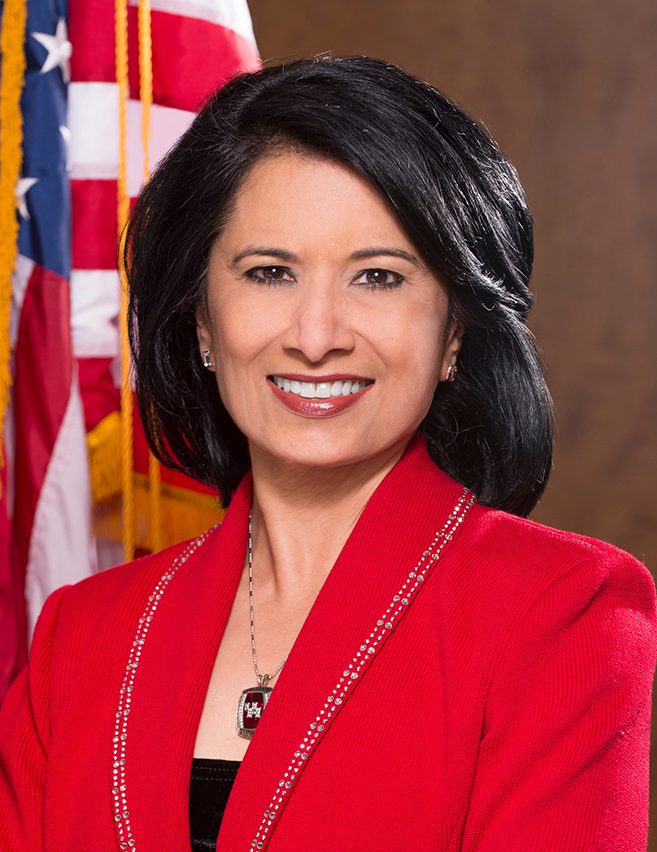
- Khator in 2015

8th Chancellor of the University of Houston System
- Incumbent
- Assumed office January 15, 2008
- Preceded by: Jay Gogue

13th President of the University of Houston
- Incumbent
- Assumed office January 15, 2008
- Preceded by: Jay Gogue

Personal details
- Born: Farrukhabad, Uttar Pradesh, India
- Spouse: Suresh Khator (m. 1974)
- Children: 2
- Education: Kanpur University (BA); Purdue University (MA, PhD)
- Website: Office of the President

Academic background
- Thesis: Environmental Policy in India: Symbolism in Issues and Policies (1986)
- Doctoral advisor: Frank L. Wilson

Academic work
- Discipline: Political science
- Institutions: University of South Florida; University of Houston

Renu Khator is the eighth chancellor of the University of Houston System (UH System) and the thirteenth president of the University of Houston. In 2008, she became the first female chancellor in the state of Texas and the first Indian immigrant to lead a comprehensive research university in the U.S.

== Career ==
Prior to moving to the United States, Khator earned a bachelor's degree from the Kanpur University in 1973 in liberal arts. Moving soon thereafter, she attended Purdue University and received a Master of Arts in political science and a Doctor of Philosophy in political science and public administration in 1975 and 1985, respectively.

Beginning in 1985, Khator began a 22-year career affiliation with the University of South Florida. She served in various positions, culminating in her position as provost and senior vice president of the university.

On October 15, 2007, Khator emerged as the sole-finalist for the vacant dual-position as chancellor of the University of Houston System and president of the University of Houston. On November 5, 2007, she was confirmed by the University of Houston System Board of Regents for the dual-position and officially took office on January 15, 2008, and became the third person to hold a dual position of University of Houston System chancellor and University of Houston president.

=== Board and committee memberships ===
Khator sits or has served on the following public and private boards:

- American Athletic Conference Board of Directors (chair)
- Board of Directors, Big 12 Conference
- Association of Governing Boards of Colleges and Universities Council of Presidents
- U.S. Department of Homeland Security Academic Advisory Council
- NCAA Division I Presidential Forum
- Council on Foreign Relations
- Council of Public University Presidents and Chancellors
- The Philosophical Society of Texas
- Greater Houston Partnership Board of Directors
- Indo-American Chamber of Commerce of Greater Houston Board of Advisors
- Texas Medical Center CEO Forum
- The Coalition of Urban Serving Universities Board of Directors
- American Council on Education (ACE) Chair
- Federal Reserve Bank of Dallas, 11th District, Chair

=== Research interest ===
Khator has published five books as well as various chapters and articles on global public administration, environmental issues and South Asian politics.

== The University of Houston System ==
As chancellor of the UH System, Khator oversees four institutions of higher learning serving close to 76,000 students. Composed of UH, UH-Downtown, UH-Clear Lake and UH-Victoria, the UH System has an annual budget over $2.07 billion and results in a $6 billion-plus impact on the Greater Houston area each year.

=== The University of Houston ===
As president of the University of Houston, Khator is the CEO of the UH System flagship university. The oldest and largest institution in the UH System, UH enrolls approximately 46,000 students and awards nearly 11,000 degrees each year.

- In 2011, UH earned Tier One status for highest research activity from the Carnegie Foundation.
- UH more than tripled the number of National Academy members on the faculty and dramatically improved the graduation rates.
- UH has undergone an extensive era of construction under a $1-billion campus construction program, resulting in the 40,000-seat TDECU Stadium, increased student residence hall capacity to 8,000 and an $80-million expansion and renovation to the student center.
- The university launched new athletic training facilities and venues, including the Fertitta Center, the Guy V. Lewis Basketball Training Complex and the Houston Baseball Player Development Center.
- In 2015, UH was awarded a chapter of the prestigious Phi Beta Kappa honor society.
- In 2019, Khator helped raise more than $1 billion for UH's "Here, We Go" campaign, surpassing its goal 18 months ahead of its scheduled completion.
- In 2020, the university opened its new Tilman J. Fertitta College of Medicine, Houston's first medical school opened in more than 50 years.
- In 2021, UH accepted an invitation to join the Big 12 Conference and all University sports teams will begin competing in the conference in 2023.
- In 2022, a $10 million gift from Shell enabled UH to establish the research-focused Energy Transition Institute to drive the advancement of reliable, affordable and environmentally responsible energy for all.
- In 2023, UH received a $20 million gift from Andy and Barbara Gessner to combat the nursing labor shortage. The College of Nursing was renamed the Andy and Barbara Gessner College of Nursing in their honor.
- In July 2023, UH officially joined the Big 12 Conference.
- In November 2023, Texas voters approved an amendment to create the $3.9 billion Texas University Fund to help UH and other qualifying Texas universities to enhance their research capabilities and achieve national prominence to help drive the state economy forward.

== Controversies ==
During her tenure as University of Houston president, Renu Khator faced criticism for her administration's response to student demands for divestment from companies supplying weapons to Israel and Saudi Arabia. Despite multiple Student Government Association resolutions calling for ethical divestment, the administration maintained its investment policies. This stance drew particular attention during Khator's October 2024 State of the University address, where she highlighted institutional achievements while protesters outside called for divestment from defense contractors like Lockheed Martin and Boeing. Student organizers argued these investments conflicted with the university's stated values and called for implementation of a Socially Responsible Investment policy.

In early 2025, University of Houston students and parents voiced growing concerns about campus safety following several violent incidents. At a town hall hosted by State Rep. Jolanda Jones, students and parents expressed their fears and perceptions that campus administrators were insufficiently responsive their concerns.

An open letter circulated among students on Reddit criticized the administration’s response to a daytime sexual assault as “wholly inadequate, lacking accountability.” Another widely shared comment alleged that “Khator cares more about the football team than the students and staff safety.”

== Personal life ==
Khator was born in Farrukhabad, in Uttar Pradesh, India. Through a traditional arranged marriage, she married her husband, Suresh, in 1974. Suresh—another Purdue graduate—holds a doctorate in engineering, and is a professor and associate dean of the UH's Cullen College of Engineering. The Khators have two daughters, Pooja and Parul, who are both ophthalmologists, and three grandchildren. As chancellor of UH System and president of UH, she takes residence in the Wortham House provided for her and her family in the Broadacres neighborhood of Houston.

== Notable awards ==
Khator has received many awards over the length of her career. She was named Houstonian of the Year, inducted into the Texas Women's Hall of Fame, and received the Excellence in Leadership Awards from the U.S. Hispanic Chamber of Commerce, the President of the Year Award from the Association of College Unions International and the President's Award from the National Association of Student Affairs Administrators.

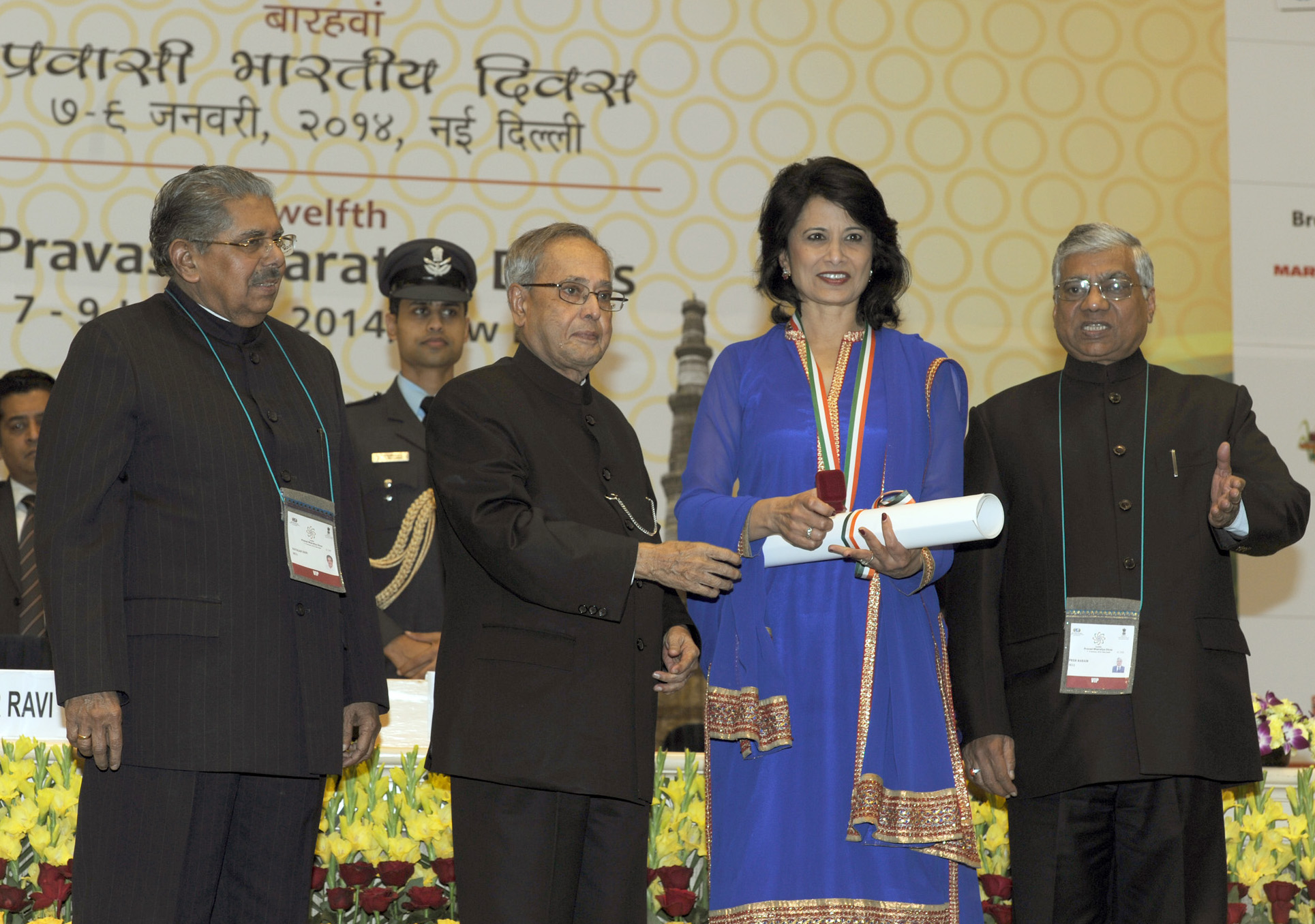
Khator receives Pravasi Bharatiya Samman from President of India

Khator also was awarded the Pravasi Bharatiya Samman from the former President Pranab Mukerjee of India, the highest honor given to non-resident Indians.

Purdue University honored Khator with a Doctor of Social Sciences degree, honoris causa, and Swansea University awarded her with a Doctor of Letters, honoris causa.

In 2020, Khator has been elected to the prestigious American Academy of Arts and Sciences for her contributions in the fields of education and academic leadership.

In 2023, she was named a Global Education and Institutional Leadership Honoree by the World Affairs Council of Greater Houston and a Houston Business Journal Women Who Mean Business Lifetime Achievement Award winner.
