= Ezekiel W. Cullen Building =

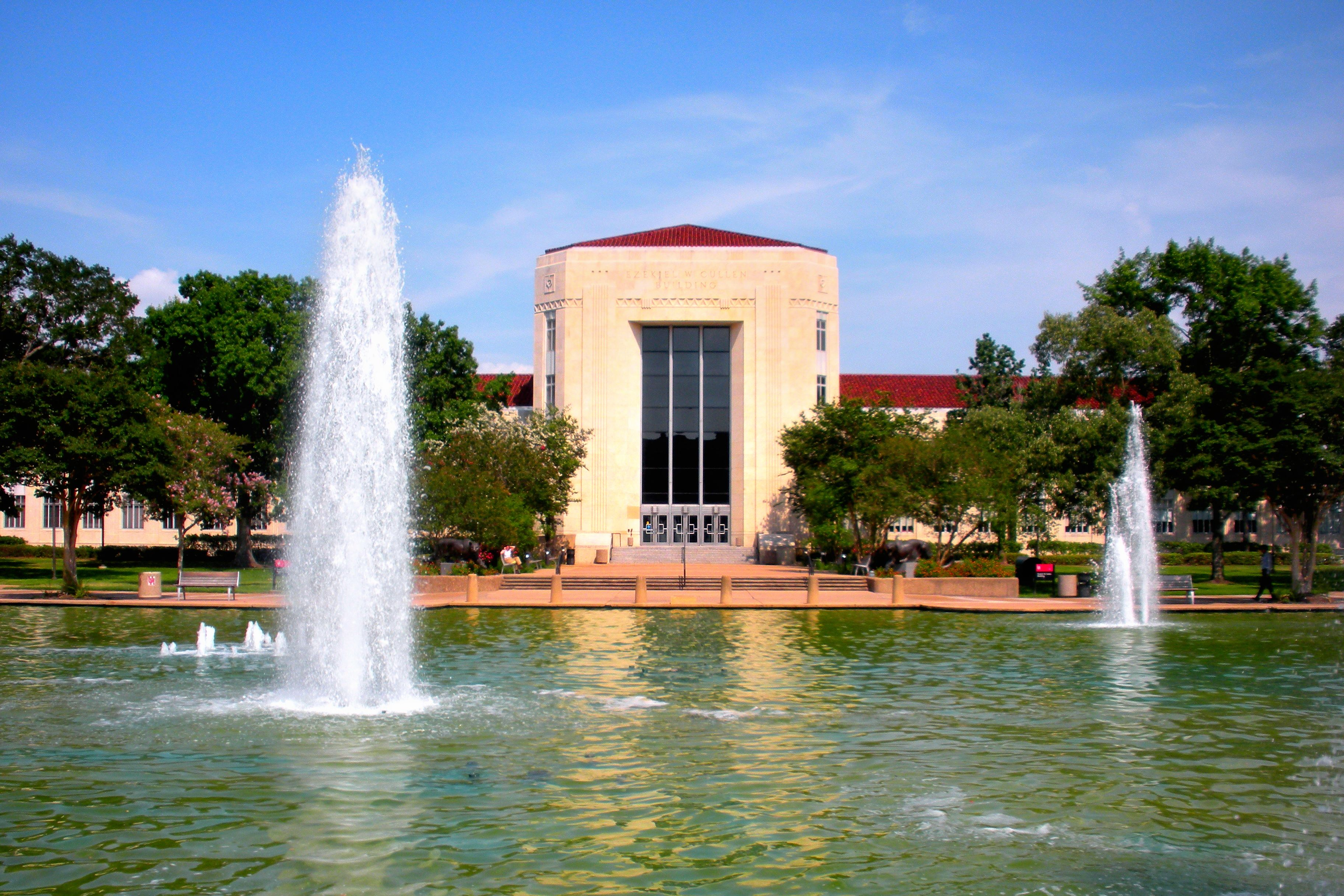
- Façade of the E. Cullen Building across from Cullen Family Plaza Fountain
- Interactive map of the Ezekiel W. Cullen Building area

General information
- Architectural style: Art Deco
- Location: Houston, Texas (US)
- Coordinates: 29.72037°N 95.34374°W
- Current tenants: University of Houston System; University of Houston
- Construction started: May 14, 1948
- Completed: October 31, 1950
- Inaugurated: October 31, 1950
- Cost: $5.5 million
- Owner: University of Houston System

Design and construction
- Architect: Alfred C. Finn

The Ezekiel W. Cullen Building, usually shortened in pronunciation as the E. Cullen Building, is a building that serves as the administrative headquarters of the University of Houston and the University of Houston System. It is named in honor of Ezekiel Wimberly Cullen, a former congressman of the Republic of Texas, and grandfather of building financier Hugh Roy Cullen. The building was designed by Texas architect Alfred C. Finn in the Art Deco style, and opened in 1950.

It is located in the Cullen Family Plaza of the University of Houston campus in Houston, and is iconic to the image of the university. The east portion of the E. Cullen Building constitutes the Cullen Performance Hall, while the west portion houses the office of the President of the University of Houston as well as other administrative offices.

== History ==
The construction of the Ezekiel W. Cullen Building was announced by the university on March 21, 1945. The construction of the E. Cullen Building was part of a large expansion to the University of Houston's permanent buildings on campus that took place starting on May 10, 1948, and the official groundbreaking ceremony occurred on May 14, 1948.

The main donor to the project was philanthropist and university chairman Hugh Roy Cullen, who requested that the building be named after his grandfather Ezekiel Wimberly Cullen. The elder Cullen had served as a leader of the Republic of Texas as a congressman and also as a justice of the Supreme Court of the Republic. While in the Third Congress of the republic as chairman of the education committee, he also sponsored the "Cullen Act", which started land endowments for schools and universities. The act effectively lay the basis for an eventual state public school system.

The university hired native Houston architect Alfred C. Finn to design the building. In order to give the building a classical look, Finn designed the building with long wings and regularly spaced pilasters. The building officially opened on Halloween of 1950. The building includes "Three portrait reliefs in gilded bronze of the Cullen family" by sculptor Mario Korbel dedicated in 1952.

Several years later, the building became home to the first public television station, KUHT. The station commenced broadcasting on May 25, 1953, from the fifth floor of the E. Cullen Building. KUHT moved to studios on Cullen Boulevard in 1964.

In 1959, a fire broke out in the E. Cullen Building, which caused severe interior and exterior damage to the building. The damage was repaired.

== Gallery ==
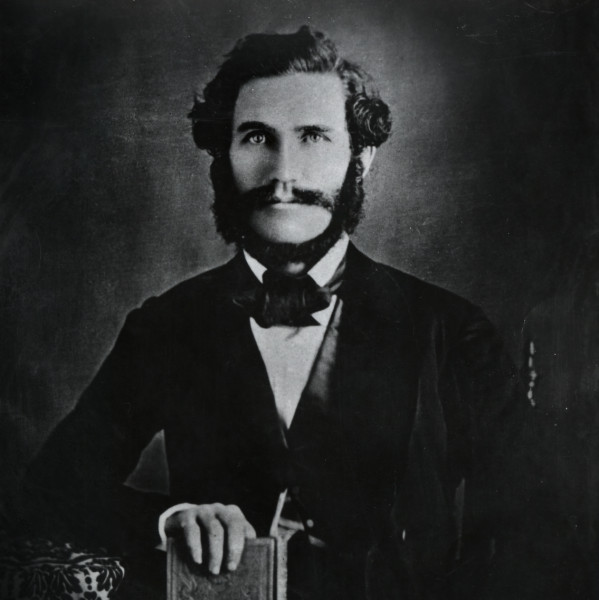
Ezekiel W. Cullen

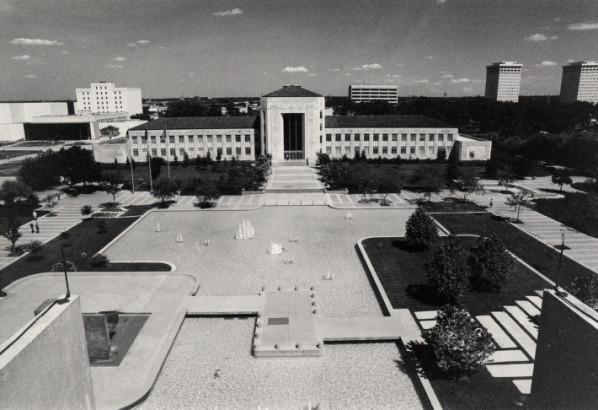
Aerial View of the Cullen Plaza

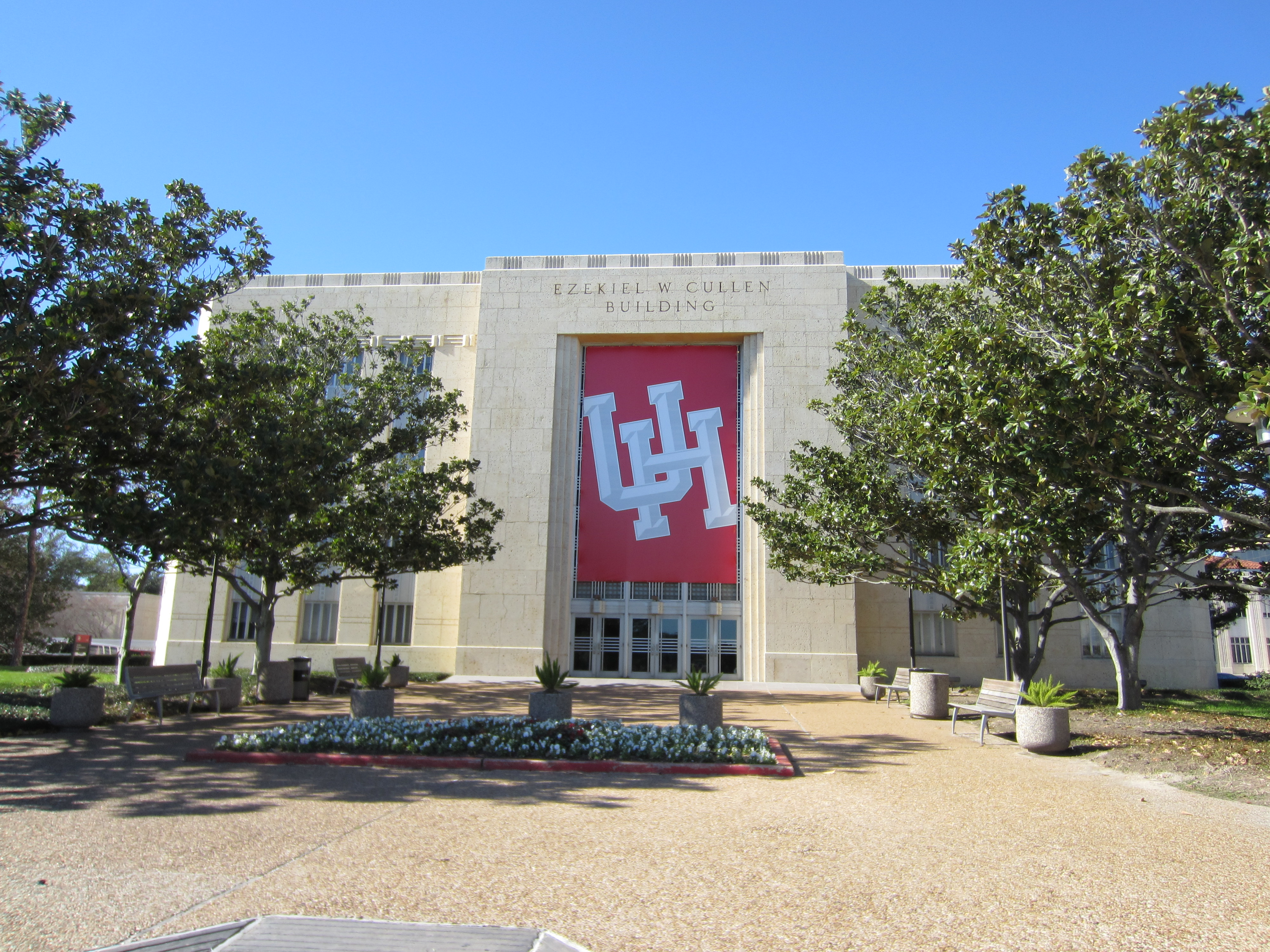
Cullen Performance Hall entrance
