= University of Houston System =

Public university system in Houston, Texas

- Motto: In Tempore (Latin)
- Motto in English: In Time
- Type: State university system
- Established: 1977; 49 years ago
- Endowment: $1.11 billion (FY2024)
- Budget: $2.09 billion (FY2025)
- Chancellor: Renu Khator
- Students: 73,533 (Fall 2022)
- Location: Houston, Texas, United States; 29.72037°N 95.34374°W
- Website: www.uhsystem.edu
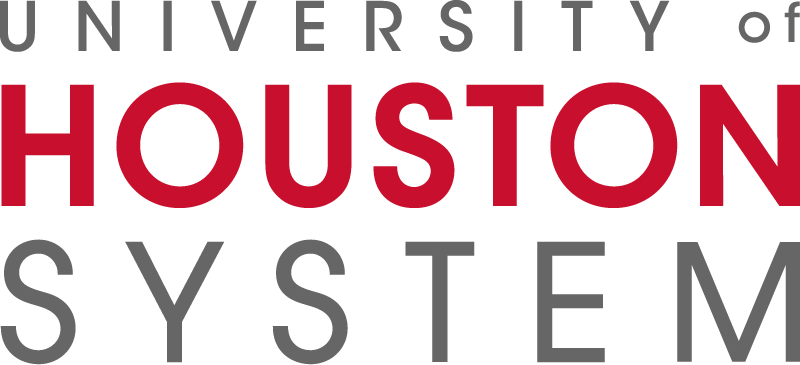

The University of Houston System is a public university system in the U.S. state of Texas, comprising three separate and distinct universities. It also owns and holds broadcasting licenses to a public television station (KUHT) and a public radio station (KUHF).

The fourth-largest university system in Texas, the UH System has more than 70,000 students and 495,000 alumni from the three distinct universities. Its flagship institution is the University of Houston, a comprehensive doctoral degree-granting research university of about 43,000 students. The economic impact of the UH System contributes over $3 billion annually to the Texas economy, while generating about 24,000 jobs.

The administration is housed in the Ezekiel W. Cullen Building, located on the campus of the University of Houston. The chancellor of the UH System is Renu Khator, who serves concurrently as president of the University of Houston. The System is governed by nine voting-member board of regents, appointed by the Governor of Texas.

== History ==
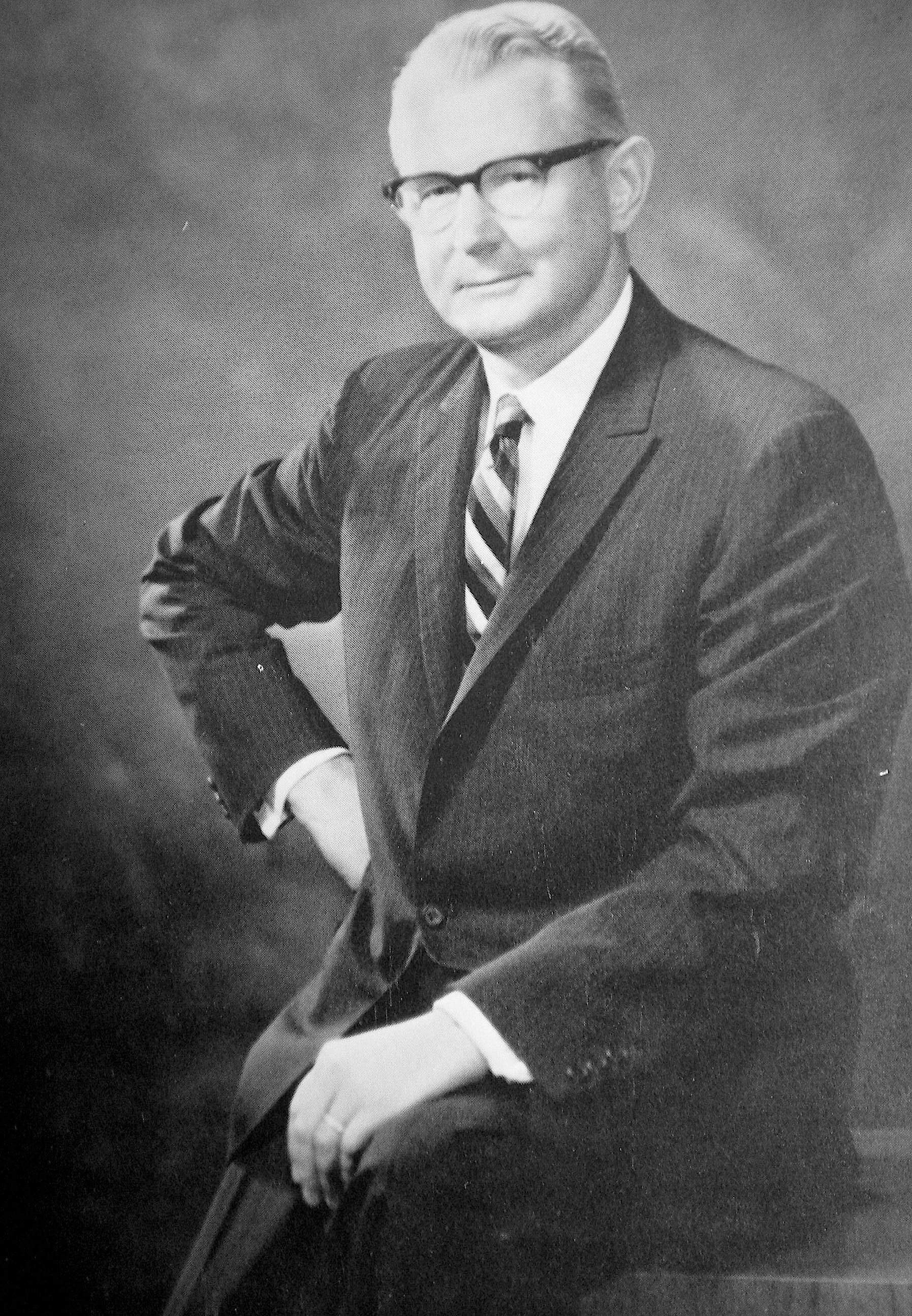
Philip G. Hoffman, first chancellor of UH System

The University of Houston, founded in 1927, entered the state system of higher education in 1963. The evolvement of a multi-institution University of Houston System came from a recommendation in May 1968 which called for the creation of a university near NASA's Manned Spacecraft Center to offer upper-division and graduate-level programs. By 1971, the 62nd Texas Legislature passed House Bill 199 authorizing the establishment of the University of Houston at Clear Lake City as a separate and distinct institution with the organization and control vested in the Board of Regents of the University of Houston.

Recognizing the need for a university presence in Downtown Houston, the board of regents acquired the assets of South Texas Junior College on August 6, 1974 and opened the University of Houston–Downtown College (UH/DC) as a four-year institution under the organization and control of the University of Houston. By August 1979, it became a stand-alone university when the 66th Texas Legislature established UH/DC as a separate and distinct institution in the University of Houston System.

The University of Houston System was created by statute on August 29, 1977, under House Bill 188 during the 65th Texas Legislature. The Board of Regents of the University of Houston was renamed the Board of Regents of the University of Houston System. Philip G. Hoffman became the first chancellor of the System, after serving as president of the University of Houston from 1961 to 1977.

During the 68th Texas Legislature, Senate Bill 235 (SB 235) was signed into law and became effective immediately on April 26, 1983. The bill statutorily established the University of Houston–Victoria as a separate and distinct institution in the University of Houston System, and allowed the university system to acquire and dispose of land or other real property outside of Harris County. In addition, SB 235 changed the names of existing UH System institutions as follows:

University of Houston was renamed University of Houston–University Park;
University of Houston at Clear Lake City was renamed University of Houston–Clear Lake; and
University of Houston–Downtown College was renamed University of Houston–Downtown.

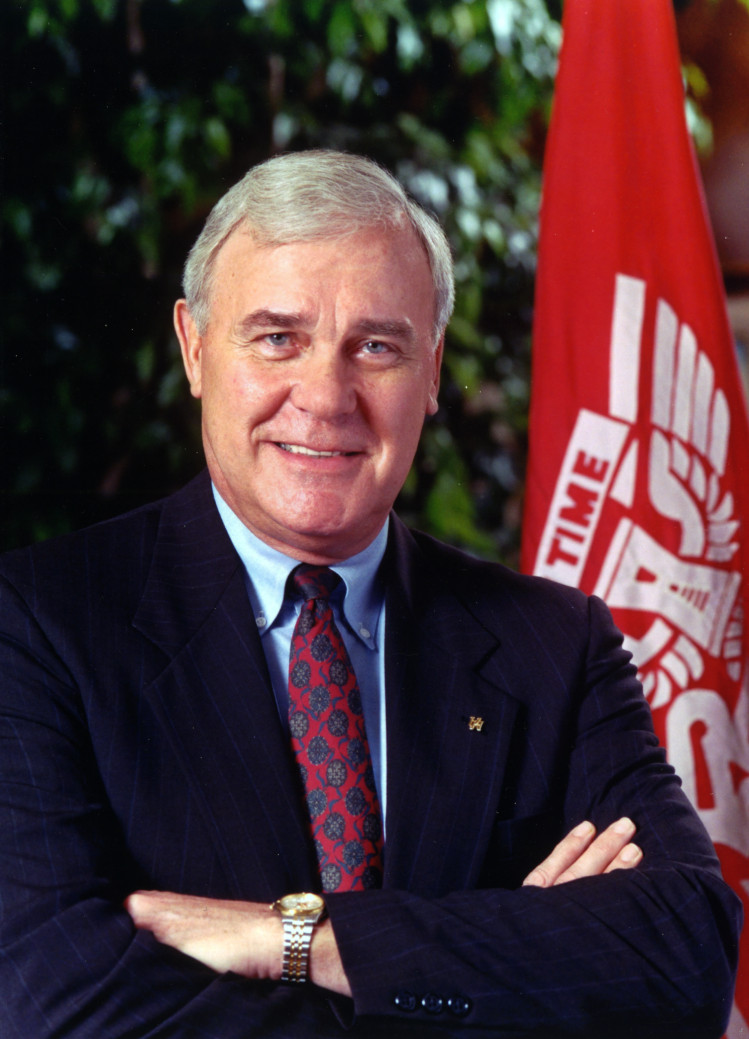
Arthur K. Smith, sixth chancellor of UH System

A proposal to reorganize and consolidate state university systems emerged in 1986. The UH System would have been merged into a new university system to include a total of 10 institutions under the recommended reorganization referred to as the "Gulf Coast System." The proposed consolidation grouping drew oppositions from affected institutions, and the plan never materialized.

In 1991, the University of Houston–University Park reverted to its original name: University of Houston. The addition of the "University Park" appellation was done with little discussion and had never gained community acceptance.

In 1997, the administrations of the UH System and the University of Houston were combined under a single chief executive officer, with the dual title of Chancellor of the UH System and President of the University of Houston. Arthur K. Smith became the first person to have held the combined position.

In November 2007, Renu Khator was selected as the eighth chancellor of the University of Houston System and thirteenth president of the University of Houston. Khator became the first female to hold the chancellorship position, and took office in January 2008. She is the third person to hold the dual role of UH System chancellor and UH president.

On November 16, 2011, the University of Houston System announced that the University of Houston as an institution would replace the university system as the administrative entity for the University of Houston System at Sugar Land. With this action, the campus was renamed the "University of Houston Sugar Land" in January 2012.

On May 27, 2025, Governor Greg Abbott signed legislation which transferred UH-Victoria to the Texas A&M University System effective September 1, 2025.

== Organizational structure ==
=== Governance ===
The 3 University of Houston System Locations.

The governance, control, jurisdiction, organization, and management of the University of Houston System is vested in its board of regents. The board has all the rights, powers, and duties that it has with respect to the organization and control of the four component institutions in the System; however, each component institution is maintained as a separate and distinct university.

The Board consists of a chair, vice-chair, secretary, and seven other members, including one student who serves a one-year term as regent. Every two years, the Governor of Texas, subject to the confirmation of the Texas Senate, appoints three members to the board of regents. Every member except for the student regent serves a six-year term. Responsibilities for members are specifically listed in the bylaws of the board of regents.

As of 2025, the chairman of the board of regents is Jack B. Moore.

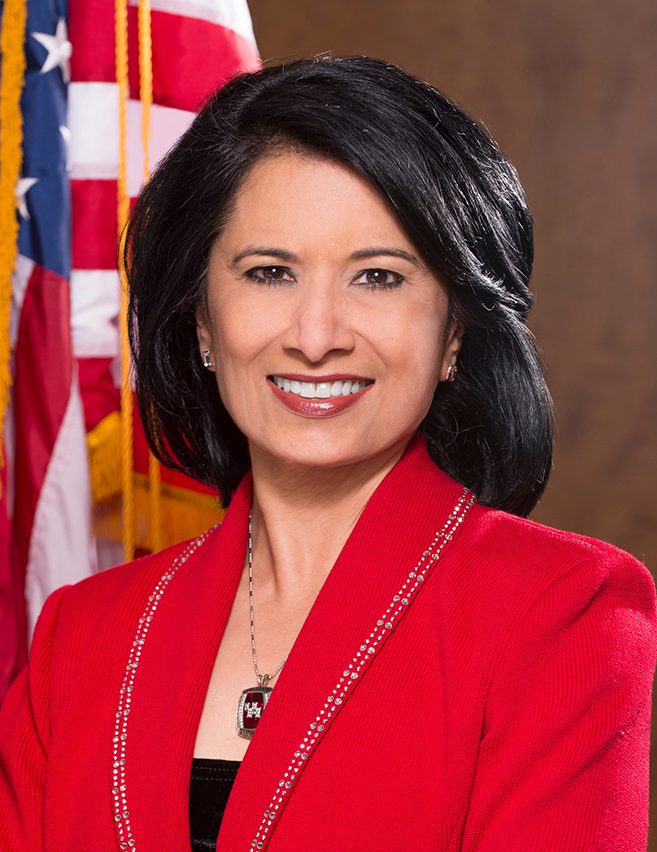
Renu Khator, chancellor of University of Houston System

=== Administration ===
The chancellor is the chief executive officer of the University of Houston System. The chancellor, appointed by the System's board of regents, has certain authorities that are specified in the regent bylaws. The chancellor has the option to delegate responsibilities to others such as the vice-chancellor, university presidents, and university athletic directors. Such delegations are subject to the board of regents bylaws and UH System policies.

Since 1997, the UH System chancellor has been serving concurrently as the President of the University of Houston. Thus, the chancellor holds a dual role. As of January 2008, Renu Khator has been the chancellor of UH System and president of the University of Houston. The administration of the System is located in the Ezekiel W. Cullen Building on the campus of the University of Houston.

The Chancellor's official residence is known as the "Wortham House." The house was designed by Alfred C. Finn, and built by Frank P. Sterling in 1925 as the "Sterling House." In 1948, the house was donated to the Museum of Fine Arts, Houston, and later sold to Gus and Lyndall Wortham in 1951. Upon her death in July 1980, Lyndall Wortham donated the property to the University of Houston. The house, located in the Houston neighborhood of Southampton, serves as a facility for small functions or gatherings of the UH System.

== Component institutions ==
At present, the University of Houston System is self described as a "three-university organization" consisting of the campuses listed below. These campuses are under the control of the board of regents and chancellor. Each institution is a stand-alone university, confers its own degrees, and maintain additional instruction sites within the Houston Metropolitan area.

Institution	Founded	Enrollment (Fall 2022)	Campus Acreage	Freshman Admission Rate (Fall 2022)	6-year Graduation Rate (Fall 2022)	Endowment (FY2024)	Research Expenditures (Fall 2022)	Carnegie Classification	Athletics				Rankings			
Institution	Founded	Enrollment (Fall 2022)	Campus Acreage	Freshman Admission Rate (Fall 2022)	6-year Graduation Rate (Fall 2022)	Endowment (FY2024)	Research Expenditures (Fall 2022)	Carnegie Classification	Affiliation	Nickname	Mascot	Colors	U.S. News & World Report National Ranking (2024)	U.S. News & World Report Social Mobility (2024)	Forbes America’s Top Colleges (2023)	Washington Monthly Ranking (2023)
University of Houston	1927	46,700	667	67.7%	62.0%	$862.01 million	$241.42 million	Doctoral: Very high research spending and doctorate production (R1)	NCAA Div I Big 12	Cougars	Shasta and Sasha		133 (tie)	31 (tie)	152	208; National Universities
University of Houston–Clear Lake	1971	8,562	524	69.5%	52.4%	$34.05 million	$1.80 million	Doctoral/Professional (D/PU)	—N/a	Hawks	Hunter the Hawk		304 (tie)	143 (tie)	297	131; National Universities
University of Houston–Downtown	1974	14,208	20	88.4%	30.8%	$49.20 million	$1.87 million	Master's: Larger Program (M1)	—N/a	Gators	Ed-U-Gator		62 (tie); Regional Universities; West	36 (tie); Regional Universities; West	495	92; Master's Universities

=== Former institutions ===
Institution	Founded	Left	Current system	Enrollment (Fall 2022)	Campus Acreage	Freshman Admission Rate (Fall 2022)	6-year Graduation Rate (Fall 2022)	Endowment (FY2024)	Research Expenditures (Fall 2022)	Carnegie Classification	Athletics				Rankings			
Institution	Founded	Left	Current system	Enrollment (Fall 2022)	Campus Acreage	Freshman Admission Rate (Fall 2022)	6-year Graduation Rate (Fall 2022)	Endowment (FY2024)	Research Expenditures (Fall 2022)	Carnegie Classification	Affiliation	Nickname	Mascot	Colors	U.S. News & World Report National Ranking (2024)	U.S. News & World Report Social Mobility (2024)	Forbes America’s Top Colleges (2023)	Washington Monthly Ranking (2023)
Texas A&M University–Victoria	1973	2025	Texas A&M University System	4,063	20	83.2%	22.7%	$16.33 million	$0.55 million	Master's: Larger Program (M1)	NAIA; RRAC	Jaguars	jaX		95 (tie); Regional Universities; West	62 (tie); Regional Universities; West	—N/a	260; Master's Universities

=== Off campus branches ===
Each university has additional instruction sites that make education accessible to the greater population of Houston. Each are degree-granting, and students have the same status as other University of Houston students. The following are schools and their respective off campus branches:

University of Houston

- UH at Sugar Land
- UH at Katy

University of Houston-Clear Lake

- UHCL at Pearland
- UHCL at the Texas Medical Center

University of Houston-Downtown

- UHD Northwest
- UHD at Lone Star College - Cy-Fair
- UHD at Lone Star College - Kingwood
- UHD at Houston Community College - Coleman

=== Other Enterprises ===
The University of Houston system owns and operates various facilities, centers, and institutes:

University of Houston

- University of Houston Coastal Center - the home of the Texas Institute for Coastal Prairie Research and Education
- UH Observatory
- Advanced Manufacturing Institute (AMI)
- Center for Carbon Management in Energy (CCME)
- HEALTH Research Institute
- Hewlett Packard Enterprise Data Science Institute (HPE DSI)
- Humana Integrated Health System Sciences Institute
- Hurricane Resilience Research Institute (HuRRI)
- Texas Center for Superconductivity at UH (TcSUH)
- Texas Institute for Measurement, Evaluation and Statistics (TIMES)
- Community Design Resource Center
- DesignLAB
- Blaffer Art Museum
- Cynthia Woods Mitchell Center for the Arts
- AIM Center for Investment Management
- Dakri Center for Economic Inclusion
- Gutierrez Energy Management Institute
- Institute for Regional Forecasting
- Stagner Sales Excellence Institute
- UH Small Business Development Center
- Wolff Center for Entrepreneurship
- Subsea Institute
- Center for Information Security Research and Education
- Center for Life Sciences Technology
- Computational Biology & Medicine Laboratory
- Optical Bioimaging Lab
- Power and Energy Conversion (PEC) Lab
- UX Lab
- Wireless and Optical Networking Lab
- Blakely Advocacy Institute
- Criminal Justice Institute (CJI)
- Health Law & Policy Institute
- Institute for Intellectual Property & Information Law (IPIL)
- The Texas Innocence Network (TIN)
- Arte Público Press
- Texas Center for Learning Disabilities
- Methodist Sugar Land Hospital Nursing Simulation Center
- HCA Houston Healthcare Nursing Simulation Center
- The Center for Experimental Therapeutics & Pharmacoinformatics (CEPT)
- The Heart and Kidney Institute (HKI)
- The Institute of Community Health (ICH)
- The Prescription Drug Misuse Education and Research (PREMIER) Center
- Hub for Engaged Action Research Lab
- Child and Family Center for Innovative Research (CFCIR)
- Mental Health Research Innovation Treatment Engagement Service Research Center (MH-RITES)
- SUSTAIN Wellbeing COMPASS Coordinating Center
- Center for Public Policy
- Elizabeth D. Rockwell Center on Ethics and Leadership (EDR Center)

University of Houston-Clear Lake

- Diplomacy Institute
- Environmental Institute of Houston
- Health and Human Performance Institute
- Institute for Human and Planetary Sustainability
- Center for Robotics Software
- Center for Autism and Developmental Disabilities
- Psychological Services Clinic
- McWhirter Professional Development Laboratory School
- Center for Workplace Consulting

University of Houston-Downtown

- Center for Community Engagement and Service Learning
- Center for Social Inquiry and Transformation
- Center for Public Service and Community Research
- Center for Latino Studies
- Center for Public Deliberation
- Center for Plain English Research and Study
- Center for Public Deliberation
- Center for Diversity & Inclusion
- Center for Teaching and Learning Excellence
- Center for Urban Agriculture and Sustainability
- Cultural Enrichment Center
- Institute for Business, Ethics, and Public Issues
- Insurance & Risk Management Center
- O'Kane Gallery
- O'Kane Theatre

== Student profile ==
UH System Student Enrollment Percentages
	Undergraduate (2022)	Graduate (2022)	Doctoral (2022)	Professional (2022)	UH System (2022)
Native American or American Indians	0.1%	0.1%	0.2%	0%	0.1%
Hispanic and Latino Americans	42.8%	20.4%	12.7%	25.8%	38.1%
Non-Hispanic White Americans	19.1%	26.2%	22.3%	20.8%	20.4%
Non-Hispanic Asian American	18.0%	12.5%	6.6%	13.3%	16.7%
Non-Hispanic Pacific Islander Americans	0.1%	0.1%	0.0%	0.0%	0.1%
Non-Hispanic African American	12.0%	12.1%	8.1%	33.3%	12.0%
Non-Hispanic Multiracial Americans	2.9%	2.2%	1.1%	5.0%	2.7%
Unknown	1.1%	1.4%	1.7%	1.7%	1.2%
International students	3.8%	25.1%	47.3%	0.0%	8.7%
