= University of Houston College of Medicine =

Medical school of the University of Houston

Coordinates: 29°42′41″N 95°20′9″W

Tilman J. Fertitta Family College of Medicine
- Type: Public Medical school
- Established: 2019
- Parent institution: University of Houston
- Affiliation: Hospital Corporation of America
- Dean: Stephen J. Spann, MD
- Location: Houston, Texas
- Campus: Urban
- Website: uh.edu/medicine

The Tilman J. Fertitta Family College of Medicine, located in Houston, Texas, is the graduate medical school of the University of Houston. The school enrolled its first class of 30 students in 2020.

== History ==
The University of Houston System Board of Regents voted to establish a medical school at the system's flagship campus in 2017. The Texas Legislature authorized the medical school in 2019.

The UH College of Medicine enrolled its inaugural class of 30 students in 2020. All students in the inaugural class received full tuition scholarships. The second class of 30 students has been admitted and started attending in-person lectures after the option of a "pre-matriculation" anatomy program taught by the Anatomy Distinction students the year above and various staff members.

The first year of classes were largely virtual due to the COVID-19 pandemic with in person anatomy lab for dissections with students broken into small groups. The last 6 weeks of classes were delivered in person, with students wearing masks. The classes are also broken up into two "learning communities," which were named by the students, who chose to name them after notable physicians. The inaugural class chose to name their learning communities after Dr. Thelma Patten and Dr. Rebecca Lee Crumpler, the first black female physician in the United States.

Anatomy professor Dr. Thomas Gest serves as president-elect of the American Association of Clinical Anatomists and runs a six-week summer "Anatomy Distinction" program for accepted medical students who seek to have this distinction. In addition to the six-week dissection program, students must assist in teaching anatomy courses and publish an anatomy research paper by their fourth year to have this distinction on their diploma. The curriculum encourages students to express gratitude for the donated bodies, viewing them as a gift for their learning and expressing gratitude to the families of those who donated.

University of Houston COM also has a partnership with Humana, who provided research grants for students to perform Health Equity research during their summer. Several posters were presented by both college students in pre-medical programs across the country and the medical students of the inaugural class during a virtual poster presentation conference.

The program offers mentorship for incoming classes via a "big sib, little sib" program, also providing a family with "big cuz" and "little cuz" options.

With a large emphasis on health equity and increasing diversity in the physician population as well as providing mentorship in the local areas, medical students provide mentorship to pre-medical students at Jack Yates High School, located in the Third Ward.

In 2022, students of the medical school created an editorially independent open-sourced and peer-reviewed medical journal, Tourniquet: Tejas Journal for Medicine and the Arts. The journal includes both research and artistic pieces, open to submissions from health care providers and students in Texas, ISSN: 2834–4618.

Students perform "Longitudinal Primary Care" on a weekly basis at a primary care clinic that they are assigned to, with some students working under professor/faculty at The Lonestar Circle of Care, a clinic located in first floor of the Health 2 building, where the students currently attend classes on the 8th and 9th floors.

In February 2021, the College of Medicine was named a member institution of the Texas Medical Center.

On May 19, 2022, the UH College of Medicine announced it would be named for the Tilman J. Fertitta family, following a donation by Fertitta of $50 million.

== Demographics ==
UH College of Medicine Inaugural Class:

- 30 students
- 73% underrepresented minorities in medicine
- 63% female
- 57% first generation in college
- 40% low socioeconomic status (as defined by Texas Medical Dental Schools Application Services)
- 100% Texas resident (13 Houston natives)

== Teaching facilities ==
The UH College of Medicine has an affiliation agreement with HCA Houston Healthcare to host students and residents. It is also affiliated with MD Anderson Cancer Center and has contracts for student rotations with Legacy Health and St. Joseph Medical Center.

As of 2022, students attend class in the new dedicated UH College of Medicine building that has opened. Previously, students attend courses in the Health 2 building, on the 8th and 9th floors. "The three-story, 130,000-square-foot building is being constructed on 43-acres and will feature modern classroom and meeting spaces, state-of-the-art anatomy and simulation suites, and more."

The medical school has plans to open a low-cost direct primary care clinic on the campus of Memorial Hermann Southwest Hospital with a $1 million gift from The Cullen Trust for Health Care. This clinic is planned to be the first in a network that aims to increase healthcare access to uninsured individuals.
