= University of Houston =

State university in Houston, Texas, US

- Seal of University of Houston
- Other names: UH, U of H, or Houston
- Former names: Houston Junior College (1927–1934); University of Houston–University Park (1983–1991)
- Motto: In Tempore (Latin)
- Motto in English: "In Time"
- Type: Public research university
- Established: March 7, 1927; 99 years ago
- Founder: Edison E. Oberholtzer
- Parent institution: University of Houston System
- Accreditation: SACS
- Academic affiliations: GCU; ORAU; URA; USU
- Endowment: US$1.337 billion (FY2025)
- Budget: $1.81 billion (FY2026)
- President: Renu Khator
- Provost: Diane Z. Chase
- Faculty: 3,517 (fall 2025)
- Students: 48,950 (fall 2025)
- Undergraduates: 39,837 (fall 2025)
- Postgraduates: 9,113 (fall 2025)
- Location: Houston, Texas, United States; 29.7189°N 95.3392°W
- Campus: 894 acres (362 hectares); Large city
- Other campuses: Sugar Land; Katy
- Newspaper: The Cougar
- Colors: Scarlet Red; Albino White
- Nicknames: Cougars; Coogs
- Sporting affiliations: NCAA Division I FBS – Big 12
- Mascot: Shasta and Sasha
- Website: uh.edu

The University of Houston (/ˈhjuːstən/; HEW-stən) is a public research university in Houston, Texas, United States. It was established in 1927 as Houston Junior College, a coeducational institution and one of multiple junior colleges formed in the first decades of the 20th century. In 1934, HJC was restructured as a four-year degree-granting institution and renamed University of Houston. In 1977, it became the founding member of the University of Houston System. Today, Houston is the third-largest university in Texas, awarding 11,773 degrees for the 2024–2025 academic year. As of 2024, it has a worldwide alumni base of 331,672.

The university consists of fifteen colleges and an interdisciplinary honors college offering 310 degree programs and enrolls approximately 40,000 undergraduate and 9,000 graduate students. The university's campus, which is primarily in southeast Houston, spans 894 acres (3.62 km^{2}), with the inclusion of its two instructional sites located in Sugar Land and Katy. The university is also the founding campus of the University of Houston System.

The university is classified among "R1: Doctoral Universities – Very high research activity" and spends approximately $240 million annually in research. The university operates more than 35 research centers and institutes on campus in areas such as superconductivity, space commercialization and exploration, biomedical sciences and engineering, energy and natural resources, and artificial intelligence.

The university has more than 500 student organizations and 17 intercollegiate sports teams. Its varsity athletic teams, known as the Houston Cougars, are members of the Big 12 Conference (which it joined in 2021) and compete in the NCAA Division I in all sports. The football team has had 31 bowl game appearances (with an overall record of 14–16–1) and the men's basketball team has made 26 appearances in the NCAA Division I men's basketball tournament, including eight Elite Eight and Final Four appearances. The men's golf team has won 16 national championships, the most in NCAA history. In 2022, UH's men's track and field team earned its seventh Indoor Conference Championship title and its swimming and diving team defended its American Athletic Conference title for the sixth straight season.

== History ==
=== Founding ===
The University of Houston began as Houston Junior College (HJC). On March 7, 1927, trustees of the Board of Education of the Houston Independent School District (HISD) unanimously signed a charter founding the junior college. The junior college was operated and administered by HISD.

HJC was originally located on the San Jacinto High School campus and offered only night courses to train future teachers.

Its first class began June 5, 1927, with an enrollment of 232 students and 12 faculty recruited from Rice University, the University of Texas and Sam Houston State Teacher's College. The first session accepted no freshman students, and its purpose was to mainly educate future teachers about the college. In the fall semester, HJC opened enrollment to high school students. By then, the college had 230 students and eight faculty members holding evening classes at San Jacinto High School and day classes in area churches.

HJC's first president was Edison Ellsworth Oberholtzer, who was the dominant force in establishing the junior college.

UH held its first classes at San Jacinto High School in 1927

=== University beginnings ===
The junior college became eligible to become a university in October 1933 when the governor of Texas, Miriam A. Ferguson, signed House Bill 194 into law. On September 11, 1933, Houston's Board of Education adopted a resolution to make HJC a four-year institution and changing its name to the University of Houston. Unanimously approved by the board, the formal charter of UH was passed April 30, 1934.

UH's first session as a four-year institution began June 4, 1934, at San Jacinto High School with an enrollment of 682. By the fall semester it had 909 students enrolled in classes taught by 39 faculty members in three colleges and schools – College of Arts and Sciences, College of Community Service and General College. In 1934, the first campus of the University of Houston was established at the Second Baptist Church at Milam and McGowen. The next fall, the campus was moved to the South Main Baptist Church on Main Street—between Richmond Avenue and Eagle Street—where it stayed for the next five years. In May 1935, the institution as a university held its first commencement at Miller Outdoor Theatre.

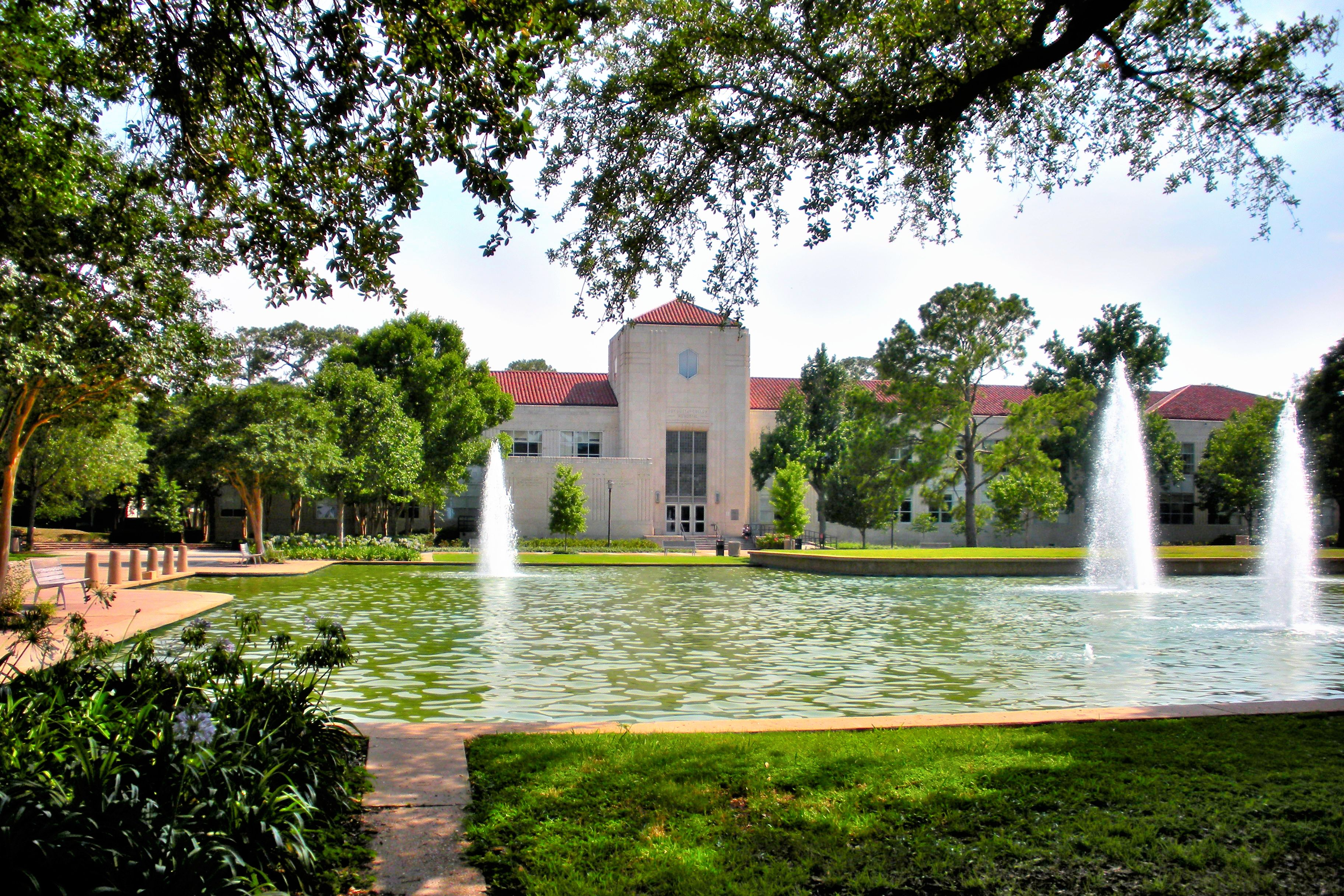
Built in 1939, the Roy G. Cullen Building was the first building on campus

In the mission of finding UH a permanent home, heirs of philanthropists J. J. Settegast and Ben Taub donated 110 acres (0.45 km^{2}) to the university for use as a permanent location in 1936. At this time, there was no road that led to the land tract, but in 1937, the city added Saint Bernard Street, which was later renamed to Cullen Boulevard. It would become a major thoroughfare of the campus. As a project of the National Youth Administration, workers were paid fifty cents an hour to clear the land. In 1938, Hugh Roy Cullen donated $335,000 (equivalent to $6 million in 2025) for the first building to be built at the location. The Roy Gustav Cullen Memorial Building was dedicated on June 4, 1939, and opened for classes officially on Wednesday, September 20, 1939. The building was the first air-conditioned college building constructed on a U.S. campus. A year after opening the new campus, the university had over 2,000 students. As World War II approached, enrollment decreased due to the draft and enlistments. The university was one of six colleges selected to train radio technicians in the V-12 Navy College Training Program. By the fall of 1943, there were only about 1,100 regular students at UH; thus, the 300 or so servicemen contributed in sustaining the faculty and facilities of the Engineering College. This training at UH continued until March 1945, with a total of 4,178 students.

On March 12, 1945, Senate Bill 207 was signed into law, removing the control of the University of Houston from HISD and placing it into the hands of a board of regents. In 1945, the university—which had grown too large and complex for the Houston school board to administer—became a private university.

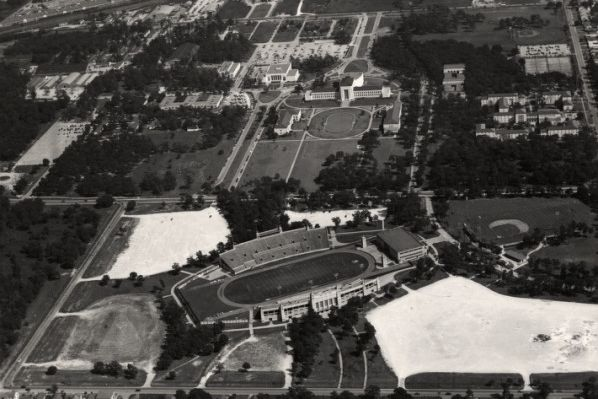
University of Houston, circa 1950

In March 1947, the regents authorized creation of a law school at the university. In 1949, the M.D. Anderson Foundation made a $1.5 million gift to UH for the construction of a dedicated library building on the campus. By 1950, the educational plant at UH consisted of 12 permanent buildings. Enrollment was more than 14,000 with a full-time faculty of more than 300. KUHF, the university radio station, signed on in November. By 1951, UH had achieved the feat of being the second-largest university in the state of Texas.

=== State university ===
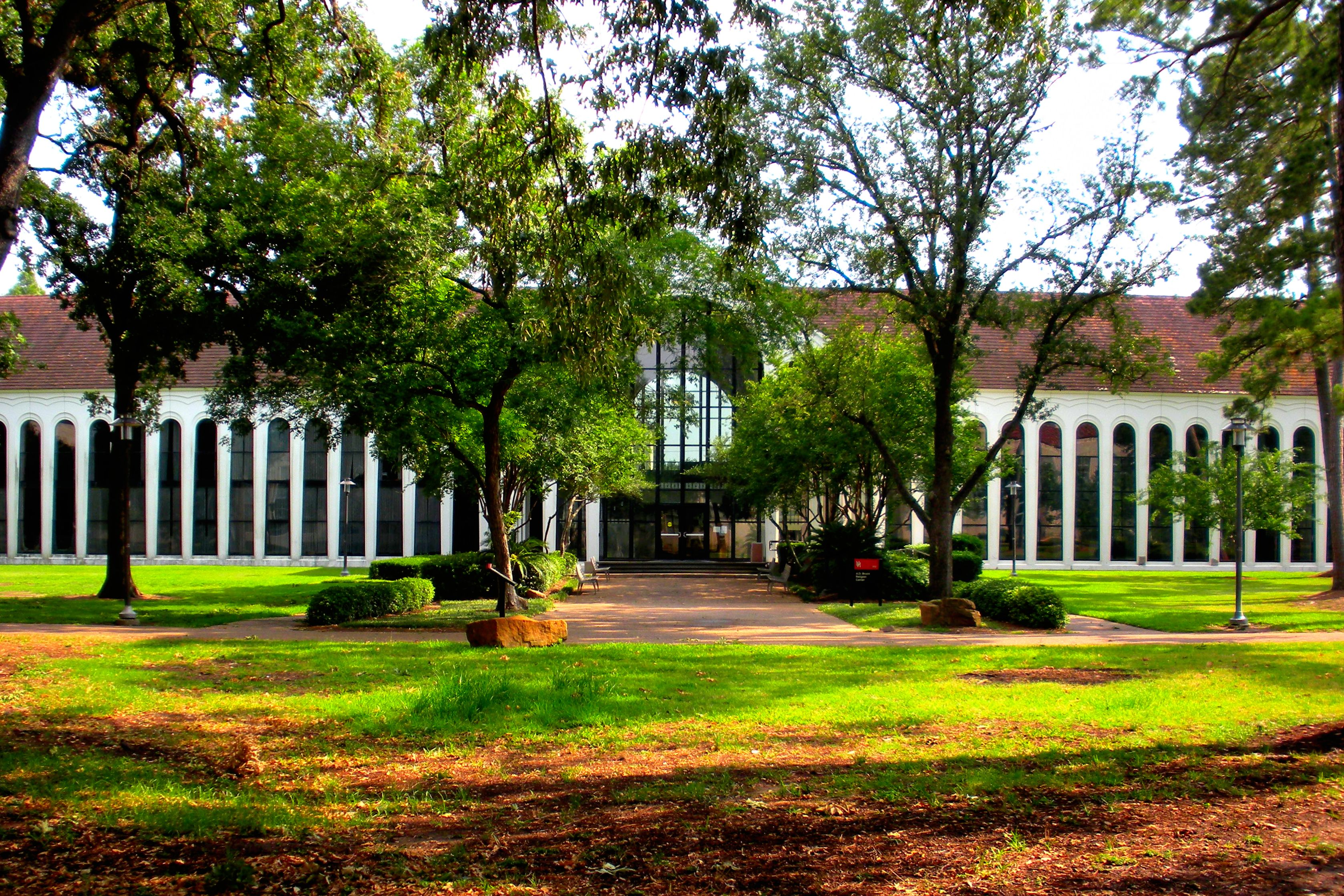
A.D. Bruce Religion Center, named after the university's third president

In 1953, the university established KUHT—the first educational television station in the nation—after the four-year-long Federal Communications Commission's television licensing freeze ended. During this period, however, the university as a private institution was facing financial troubles. Tuition failed to cover rising costs, and in turn, tuition increases caused a drop in enrollment. At that point it was proposed that UH become a state-funded university.

After a lengthy battle between supporters of the University of Houston, led by school president A.D. Bruce, and forces from state universities, including the University of Texas, geared to block the change, Senate Bill 2 was passed on May 23, 1961, enabling the university to enter the state system in 1963. Beginning roughly during this period, UH became known as "Cougar High" because of its low academic standards, which the university leveraged to its advantage in recruiting athletes.

The University of Houston, initially reserved for white and non-black students, was racially desegregated circa the 1960s as part of the civil rights movements. A group of students called Afro-Americans for Black Liberation (AABL) advocated for desegregation in that period. Robinson Block, a UH undergraduate student writing for Houston History Magazine, stated that as local businesses and student organization remained segregated by race, the first group of black students "had a hard time".

At least twelve Black students were admitted and enrolled in the fall of 1962.

The federal government donated a parcel of coastal prairie to the university in La Marque in Galveston County. Out of this developed the University of Houston Coastal Center (UHCC).

As the University of Houston celebrated its 50th anniversary, the Texas Legislature formally established the University of Houston System in 1977. Philip G. Hoffman resigned from his position as president of UH and became the first chancellor of the University of Houston System. The University of Houston became the oldest and largest member institution in the UH System with nearly 30,000 students.

On April 26, 1983, the university appended its official name to University of Houston–University Park; however, the name was changed back to University of Houston on August 26, 1991. This name change was an effort by the UH System to give its flagship institution a distinctive name that would eliminate confusion with the University of Houston–Downtown (UHD), which is a separate and distinct degree-granting institution that is not part of the University of Houston.

=== Restructuring and growth ===
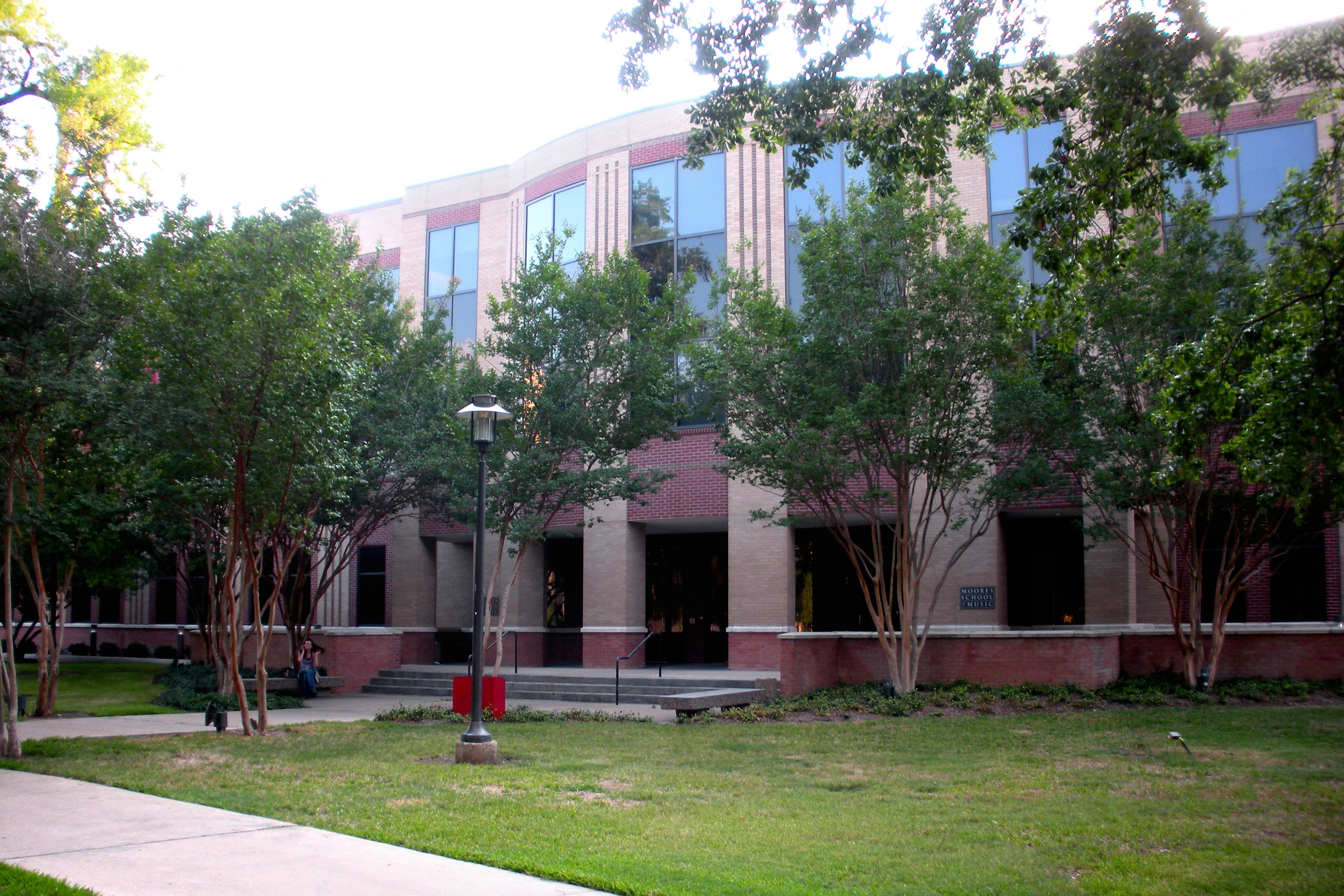
Moores School of Music Building, constructed in 1997

In 1997, the administrations of the UH System and the University of Houston were combined under a single chief executive officer, with the dual title of chancellor of the UH System and president of the University of Houston. Arthur K. Smith became the first person to hold the combined position. Since 1997, the University of Houston System Administration has been located on campus in the Ezekiel W. Cullen Building.

On October 15, 2007, Renu Khator was selected for the position of UH System chancellor and UH president. On November 5, 2007, Khator was confirmed as the third person to hold the dual title of UH System chancellor and UH president concurrently, and took office in January 2008.

In January 2011, the University of Houston was classified by the Carnegie Foundation for the Advancement of Teaching as a research university with very high research activity.

Between 2010 and 2022, undergraduate tuition increased by 47%, significantly outpacing inflation. In 2022, many students reported being incorrectly classified as out-of-state residents, resulting in tuition bills up to $11,000 higher than expected. That same year, students reported that financial aid delays left them at risk of having classes dropped, with the university acknowledging processing backlogs.

=== Campus safety in 2025 ===
In early 2025, the university faced widespread criticism for its handling of a series of violent incidents on campus, most notably a sexual assault at knifepoint in the Welcome Center parking garage. The suspect was initially released the same day due to insufficient charges, prompting the Harris County District Attorney's Office to launch a review. The incident was followed within days by two armed robberies, intensifying student outrage. Student leader Aihanuwa Ale-Opinion stated: "Students have a host of concerns regarding their safety, which the UH administration has failed to address for years."

The university fast-tracked an $18 million security upgrade, including increased lighting and patrols. Critics argued these measures came only after years of negligence.

== Campus ==
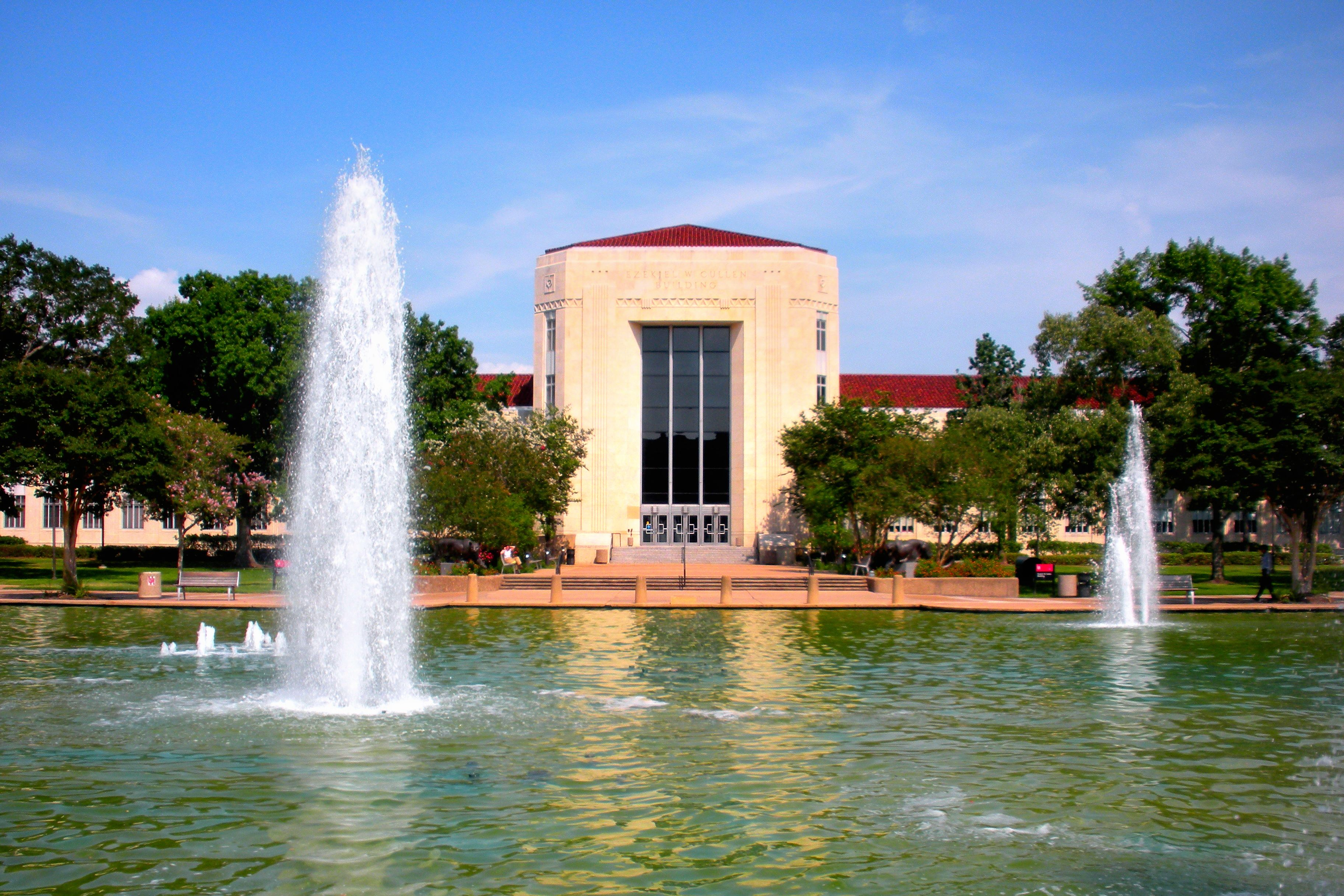
Ezekiel W. Cullen Building

UH is in southeast Houston, with an official address of 4800 Calhoun Road. It was known as University of Houston–University Park from 1983 to 1991. The campus spans 894 acres (3.62 km^{2}) and is roughly bisected by Cullen Boulevard—a thoroughfare that has become synonymous with the university. The Third Ward Redevelopment Council defines the University of Houston as being part of the Third Ward. Melissa Correa of KHOU also stated that the university is in the Third Ward.

The university campus includes numerous green spaces, fountains and sculptures, including a work by famed sculptor Jim Sanborn. Renowned architects César Pelli and Philip Johnson have designed buildings on the UH campus. Recent campus beautification projects have garnered awards from the Keep Houston Beautiful group for improvements made to the Cullen Boulevard corridor.

UH is the flagship institution of the University of Houston System (UH System). It has additional instructional sites located in Sugar Land and Katy. The University of Houston–Clear Lake (UHCL) and the University of Houston–Downtown (UHD) are separate universities; they are not instructional sites of UH.

=== Campus layout ===
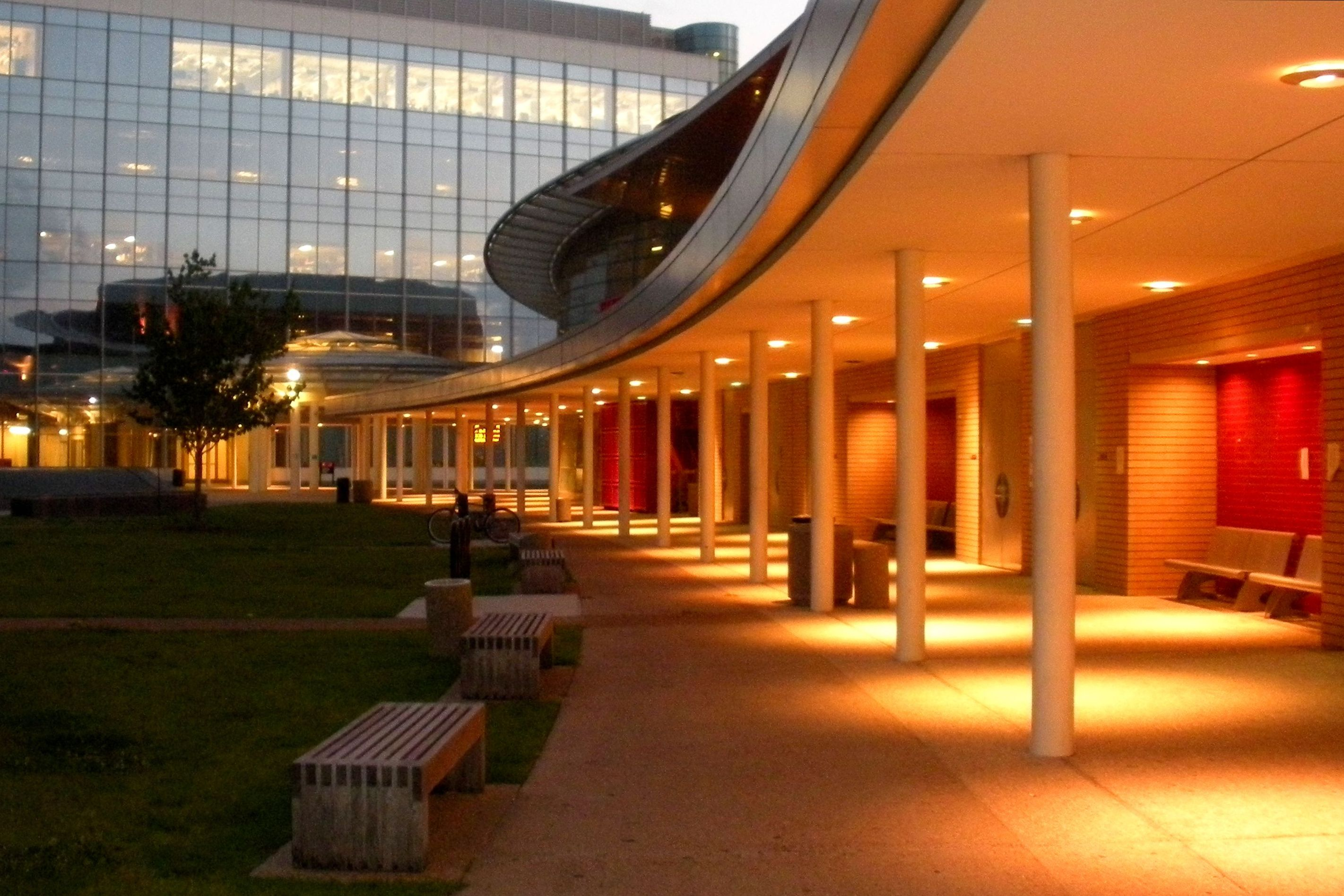
Science and Engineering Classroom Building

The University of Houston's campus framework has identified the following five core districts: the Central District, the Arts District, the Professional District, the Residential District, and the Athletics District. In addition, the campus contains several outlying areas not identified among the five districts.

The Central Distinct contains the academic core of the university and consists of the M.D. Anderson Library, the College of Liberal Arts and Social Sciences, the College of Natural Sciences and Mathematics, the College of Technology and the Honors College. The interior of the campus has the original buildings: the Roy G. Cullen Building, the Old Science Building, and the Ezekiel W. Cullen Building. Academic and research facilities include the Cullen Performance Hall, the Science and Engineering Research and Classroom Complex, and Texas Center for Superconductivity and various other science and liberal arts buildings. This area of campus features the reflecting pool at Cullen Family Plaza, the Lynn Eusan Park, and various plazas and green spaces.

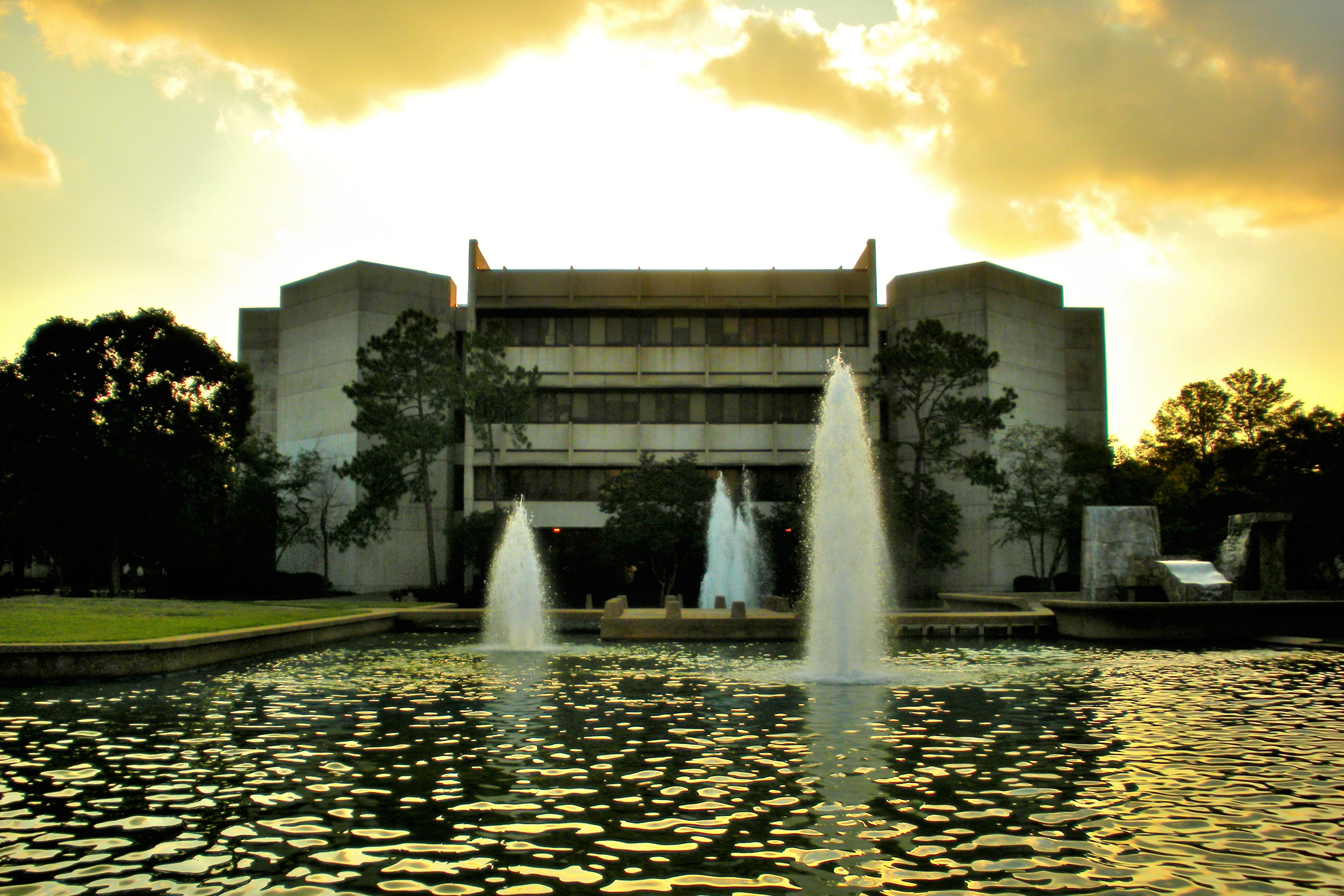
Stephen Power Farish Hall

The Arts District is located in the northern part of campus and is home to the university's School of Art, the Moores School of Music, the School of Theatre and Dance, the Gerald D. Hines College of Architecture and Design, and the Jack J. Valenti School of Communication. The district also has the Cynthia Woods Mitchell Center for the Performing Arts which houses the Lyndall Finley Wortham Theatre, the main stage of the School of Theatre and Dance, and Moores Opera Center. Other facilities include the Dudley Recital Hall and the Organ Recital Hall in the Fine Arts Building, the Quintero Theatre in the School of Theatre and Dance, and the Moores Opera House and Choral Recital Hall in the Moores School of Music Building.

The Professional District is located northeast and east of the university campus. The district has facilities of the University of Houston Law Center, the Cullen College of Engineering and the C.T. Bauer College of Business. This area of campus is home to Calhoun Lofts, which is an upper-level and graduate housing facility. The East Parking Garage is located on the east end of the district. Adjacent to the district is the University Center (UC), the larger of two student unions on campus.

The Residential District is in the southern portion of the campus, along Wheeler Avenue and east of Martin Luther King Boulevard. This area has undergraduate dormitories, the Conrad N. Hilton College of Hotel and Restaurant Management, now Conrad N. Hilton College of Global Hospitality Leadership, and the College of Optometry. Dormitory facilities include the twin 18-story Moody Towers, Cougar Village, University Lofts, Cougar Place, and the recently demolished Quadrangle which had the following five separate halls: Oberholtzer, Bates, Taub, Settegast, and Law. The Quadrangle was rebuilt in 2020 and renamed The Quad, admitting sophomore level students and up. Adjacent to the Moody Towers and Lynn Eusan Park is the Hilton University of Houston Hotel.

The Athletics District covers the northwest and west part of campus. It includes athletic training facilities for UH sport teams and its stadiums. The western part of the district is home to TDECU Stadium, the football indoor practice facility and the Stadium Parking Garage. Across the parking garage, in the northwestern portion of the district, is the Hofheinz Pavilion. In 2018, the stadium was rebuilt and renamed to the Fertitta Center after UH received a $20 million donation from entrepreneur and UH System Board of Regents chairman Tilman Fertitta. Facilities surrounding the stadium are Carl Lewis International Track & Field Complex, Cougar Field, Softball Stadium, the Alumni Center and the Athletic Center.

=== Facilities ===
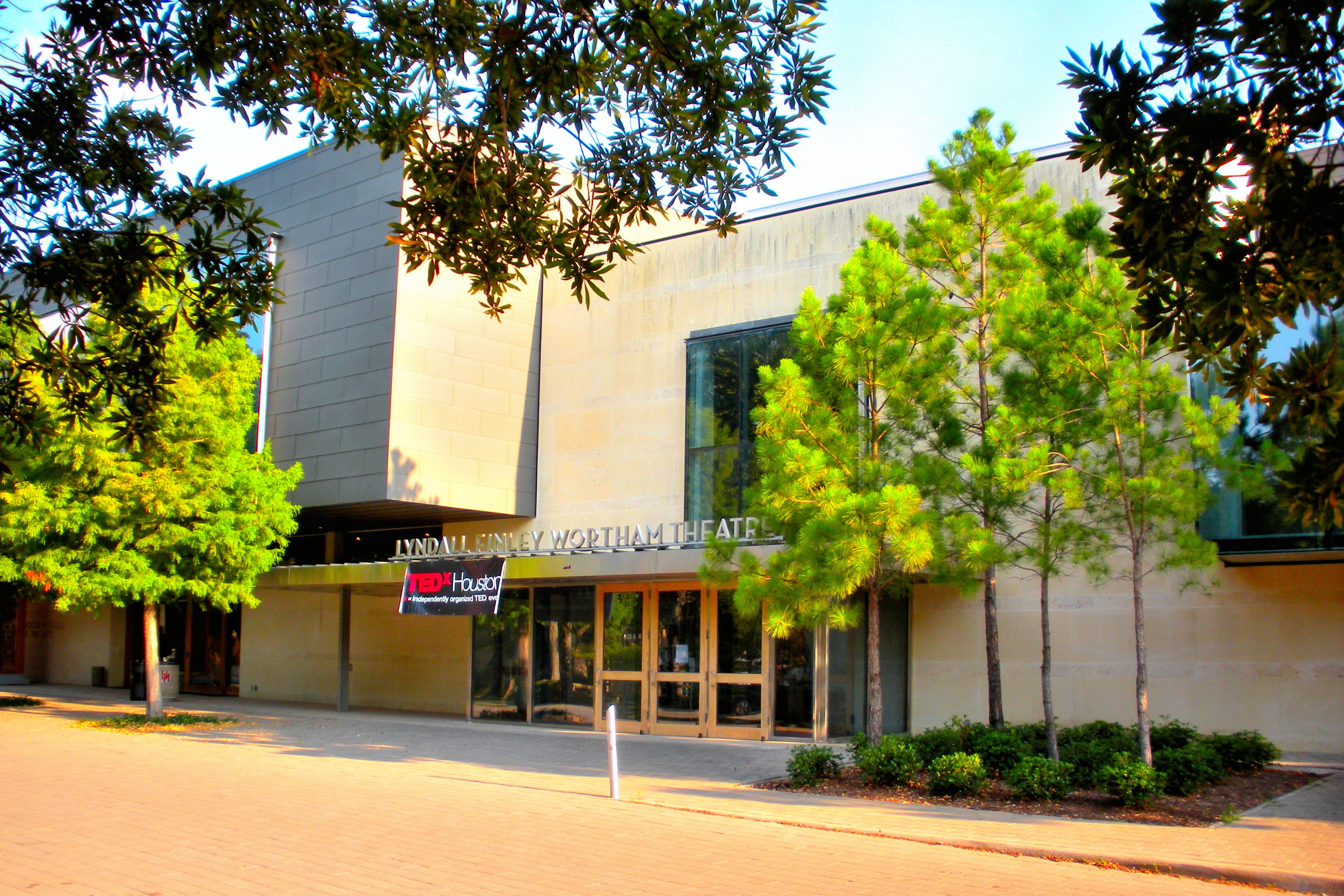
Lyndall Finley Wortham Theater

The university's Energy Research Park is a research park specializing in energy research, consisting of 74 acres (0.30 km^{2}) and 19 acres (0.077 km^{2}) of undeveloped land. Much of the physical property was originally developed in 1953 by the oilfield services company Schlumberger as its global headquarters. It was acquired by the university in 2009.

The University of Houston Libraries is the library system of the university. It consists of the M.D. Anderson Library and three branch libraries: the Music Library, William R. Jenkins Architecture, Design & Art Library and the Health Sciences Library. In addition to the libraries administered by the UH Libraries, the university also has the O'Quinn Law Library and the Conrad N. Hilton Library.

The Cullen Performance Hall is a 1,612 seat proscenium theater which offers a variety of events sponsored by departments and organizations at the university in addition to contemporary music concerts, opera, modern dance, and theatrical performances put on by groups in and outside the Houston area. The Blaffer Art Museum, a contemporary art museum, exhibits the works of both international artists and those of students in the university's School of Art.

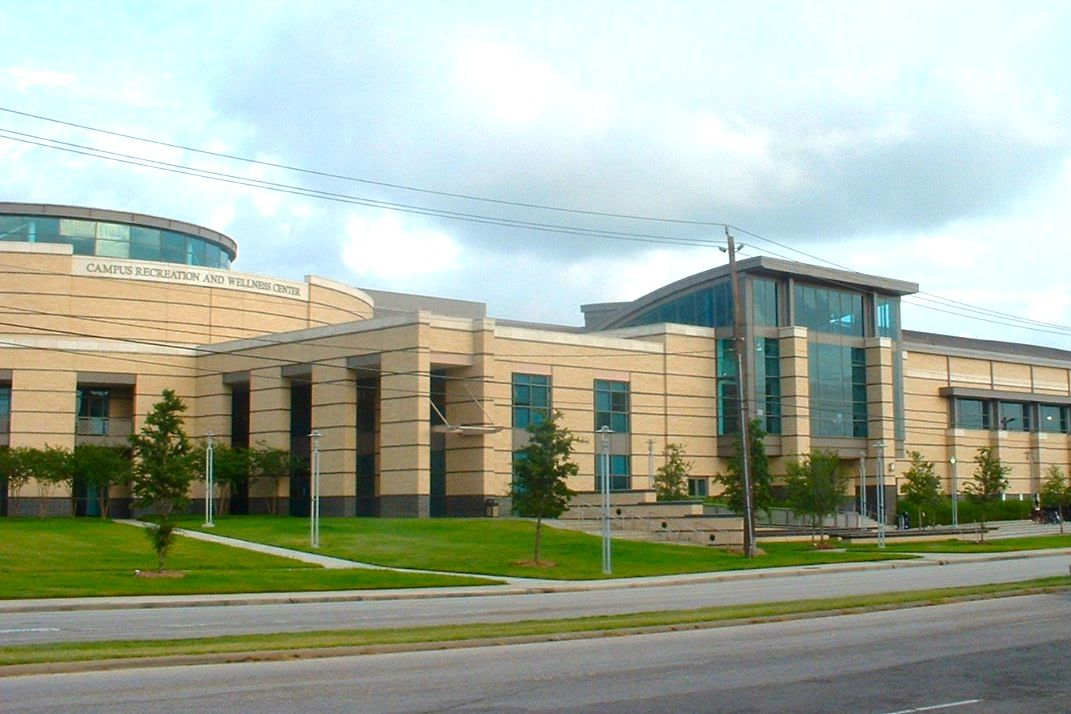
Campus Recreation and Wellness Center

The 264,000 square feet (24,500 m^{2}) Campus Recreation and Wellness Center, which is home to the nation's largest collegiate natatorium, was recognized by the National Intramural-Sports Association as an outstanding facility upon its completion in 2004.

The LeRoy and Lucile Melcher Center for Public Broadcasting houses the studios and offices of KUHT Houston PBS, the nation's first public television station; KUHF (88.7 FM), Houston's NPR station; the Center for Public Policy Polling; and television studio labs.

The 200,000 sq ft (19,000 m^{2}) Science and Engineering Complex (SEC) was designed by architect César Pelli's firm, Pelli, Clarke & Partners. It houses facilities for many interdisciplinary research programs at UH, including bionanotechnology.

The university has an on-campus Hilton hotel that is part of the Conrad N. Hilton College of Global Hospitality Leadership. This hotel was established with a donation by the founder of Hilton Hotels, Conrad N. Hilton, and is staffed by students in the College of Global Hospitality Leadership.

The University of Houston operates a 250 acres (1.0 km^{2}) branch campus in Sugar Land. The campus was founded in 1995 as a higher education "teaching center" of the University of Houston System. The branch campus has three buildings for exclusive use by the university: the Albert and Mamie George Building, Brazos Hall, and the College of Technology building. Additionally, the University Branch of the Fort Bend County Libraries system is located on the campus for use by students and the Sugar Land community.

Safety concerns have been raised regarding campus facilities. Parking garages were the site of increased crime in 2023, with 12 reported thefts in one semester at the Welcome Center Garage. Students protested a 30% increase in parking permit fees while shuttle services were reduced. Many academic buildings and labs are reportedly in need of upgrades, particularly in engineering and science facilities.

== Institutional structure ==
=== Governance ===
The University of Houston (UH) is one of four separate and distinct institutions in the University of Houston System, and was known as University of Houston–University Park from 1983 to 1991. UH is the flagship institution of the UH System. It is a multi-campus university with a branch campus located in Sugar Land. The University of Houston–Clear Lake (UHCL), the University of Houston–Downtown (UHD), and the University of Houston–Victoria (UHV) are stand-alone universities; they are not branch campuses of UH.

The organization and control of the UH is vested in the UH System Board of Regents. The board consists of nine members who are appointed by the governor for a six-year term and has all the rights, powers and duties that it has with respect to the organization and control of other institutions in the System; however, UH is maintained as a separate and distinct institution.

=== Administration ===
The president is the chief executive officer (CEO) of the University of Houston, and serves concurrently as chancellor of the UH System. The position is appointed by its board of regents. As of January 2008, Renu Khator has been president of the University of Houston and chancellor of the UH System.

The administrations of UH and the UH System are located on the university campus in the Ezekiel W. Cullen Building. From 1961 until 1977, the Weingarten House in Riverside Terrace housed the president of UH. Currently, the chancellor/president resides in the Wortham House in Broadacres Historic District, provided by the UH System Board of Regents as part of the chancellor/president's employment contract.

== Academics ==
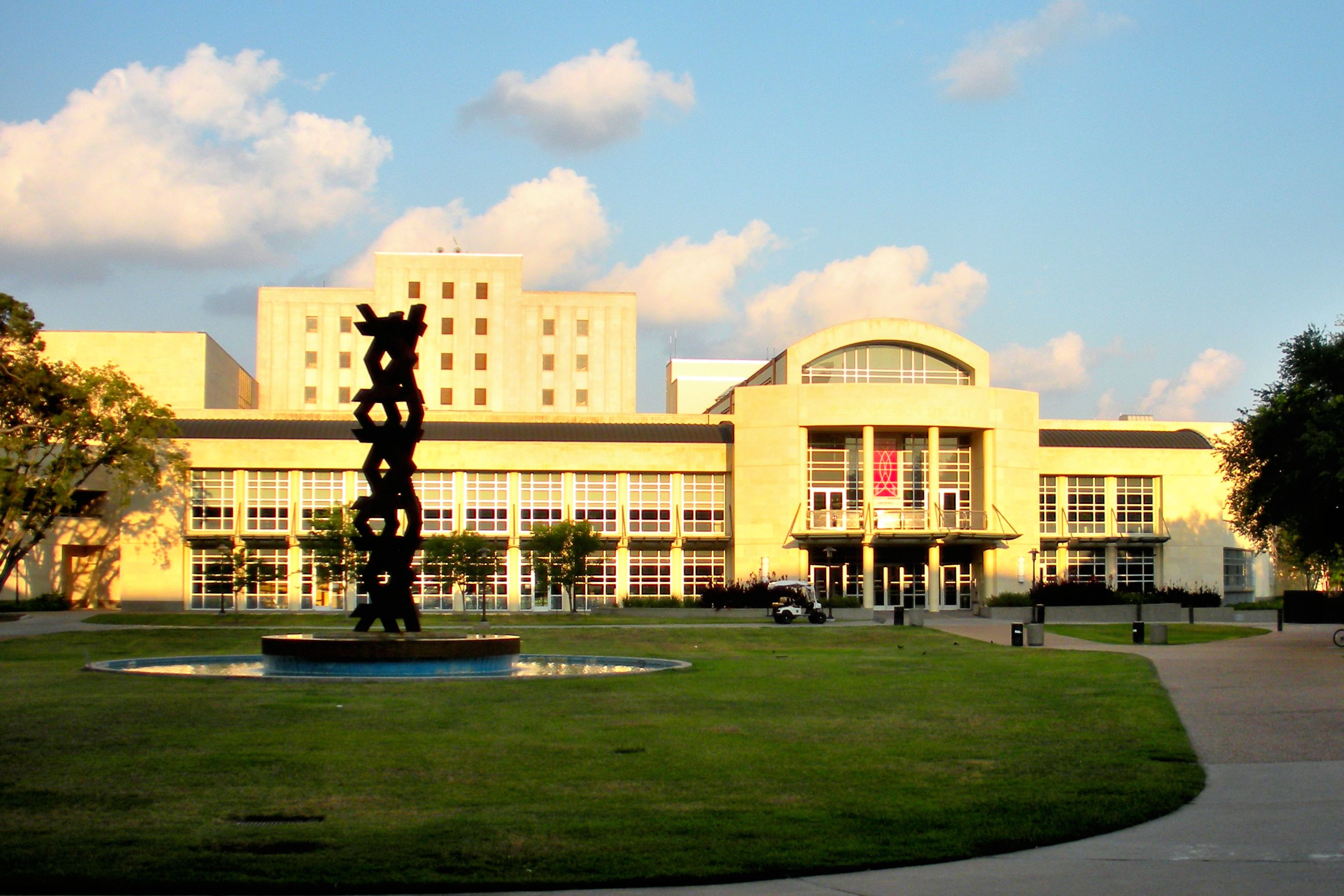
M.D. Anderson Library is the general collection library of the university

Colleges	Founded
Junior College (defunct)	1927
General College (defunct)	1933
Graduate School	1939
Cullen College of Engineering	1941
College of Technology (defunct)	1941
College of Arts and Sciences (defunct)	1942
Bauer College of Business	1942
Downtown School (defunct)	1943
College of Education	1945
College of Pharmacy	1946
University of Houston Law Center	1947
College of Nursing (defunct)	1948
College of Optometry	1952
Hines College of Architecture and Design	1956
Graduate College of Social Work	1967
Hilton College of Global Hospitality Leadership	1969
College of Continuing Education	1974
College of Natural Sciences and Mathematics	1975
College of Social Science (defunct)	1975
College of Humanities and Fine Arts (defunct)	1975
Hobby School of Public Affairs	1981
The Honors College	1993
College of Liberal Arts and Social Sciences	2000
Gessner College of Nursing	2015
Kathrine G. McGovern College of the Arts	2016
Fertitta Family College of Medicine	2019

The university offers over 310-degree programs. With final approval of a PhD in Communication Sciences and Disorders, a Doctorate in Nursing Practice, and a Doctorate in Medicine, university offers 51 doctoral degrees including three professional doctorate degrees in law, optometry, medicine and pharmacy.

In 2022, UH System Board of Regents unanimously approved the addition of a new degree program of the Bachelor of Arts in Mexican American and Latino/a Applied Studies. Being located in a city with a large Hispanic/Latino population, the degree aims to focus on the experiences and contributions of the Latino community in the United States.

UH is one of four public universities in Texas with a Phi Beta Kappa chapter. The University of Houston's faculty includes National Medal of Science recipient Paul Chu from the Physics Department, and Nobel Peace Prize Laureate Jody Williams.

The College of Liberal Arts and Social Sciences (CLASS) has the Creative Writing Program which includes founders such as alumnus Donald Barthelme and offers degrees in poetry, fiction, and non-fiction. The Gerald D. Hines College of Architecture and Design is one of only 36 schools to have an accreditation from the National Architectural Accrediting Board.

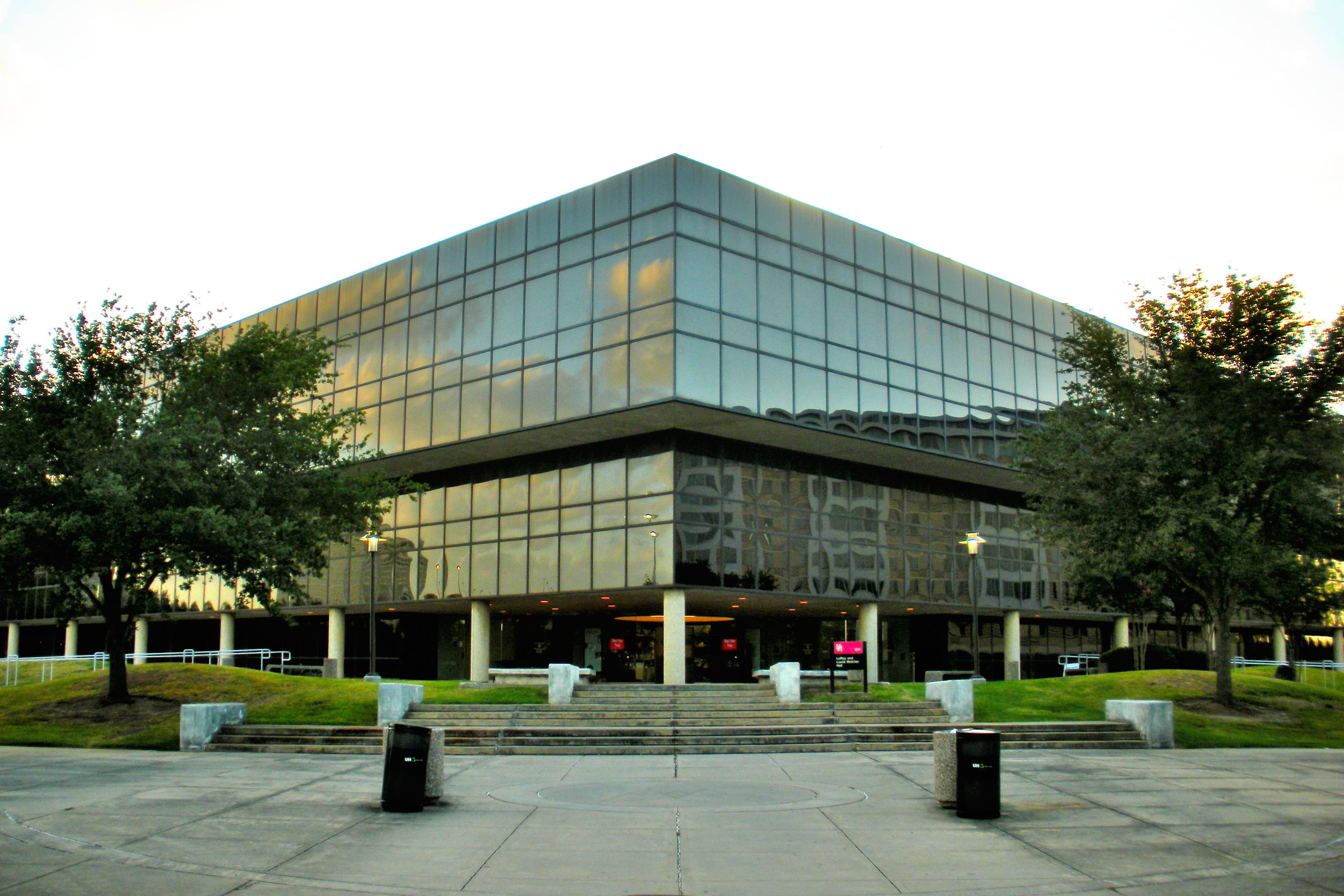
Melcher Hall, one of three buildings of the Bauer College of Business

In August 2016, the Texas Higher Education Coordinating Board approved the creation of the Hobby School of Public Affairs. The school, named in honor of former Texas Lt. Gov. Bill Hobby, builds on the existing educational and research programs of the Center for Public Policy, which was founded at UH in 1981. The designation officially moves the Master of Public Policy Degree from the UH College of Liberal Arts and Social Sciences to the Hobby School of Public Affairs and approves the addition of a Master of Public Policy degree as a dual degree with the Graduate College of Social Work's Master of Social Work.

In October 2018, the Texas Higher Education Coordinating Board approved the creation of the College of Medicine. A site has been selected for the college's new building, and the inaugural class entered in 2020.

The UHin4 fixed-tuition program has been criticized for pressuring students into taking 15+ credit semesters, with 40% of participants dropping out due to workload. In 2023, students reported technical issues with class registration systems that locked them out of required courses. The university has faced criticism for slow responses to residency appeals and credit transfer issues.

=== Rankings ===
Academic rankings

National
- Forbes: 107
- U.S. News & World Report: 132 (tie)
- Washington Monthly: 157
- WSJ/College Pulse: 245

Global
- ARWU: 201–300
- QS: 556 (tie)
- THE: 401–500
- U.S. News & World Report: 416 (tie)

In the 2026 U.S. News & World Report rankings, UH placed in the top 50 universities for social mobility. That same year, the University of Houston Law Center was ranked tied for 63rd in the nation and 5th in the state of Texas in the graduate school rankings. The undergraduate entrepreneurship studies program at the Bauer College of Business was also ranked 9th in the nation. In the 2025 The Princeton Review and Entrepreneur magazine rankings, the undergraduate entrepreneurship program ranked 1st in the nation.

Critics, including University of Houston faculty members, have alleged that the university's improvement in the U.S. News & World Report rankings was largely due to changes in the ranking methodology which removed key measures of academic excellence, such as the percentage of faculty with the highest degrees, the percentage of students in the top 10 percent of their high school class, and average class size. Those critics have said that these changes gave the appearance of progress without reflecting any meaningful improvement in academic standards and that the university administration's policies aimed at climbing the rankings have actively eroded academic excellence.

National Rankings by Subject (as of 2025)
College	Program	Ranking
BAUER	Business	Unranked
CLASS	Clinical Psychology	91 (tie)
CLASS	Economics	68 (tie)
CLASS	English	97 (tie)
CLASS	History	86 (tie)
CLASS	Political Science	58 (tie)
CLASS	Psychology	95 (tie)
CLASS	Speech-Language Pathology	39 (tie)
CULLEN	Engineering	72 (tie)
EDU	Education	81 (tie)
HOBBY	Public Affairs	72 (tie)
KGMCA	Fine Arts	124 (tie)
LAW	Law	63 (tie)
MED	Medicine: Primary Care	Unranked
MED	Medicine: Research	Unranked
NSM	Biological Sciences	175 (tie)
NSM	Chemistry	81 (tie)
NSM	Computer Science	110 (tie)
NSM	Earth Sciences	70 (tie)
NSM	Mathematics	91 (tie)
NSM	Physics	89 (tie)
PHARM	Pharmacy	41 (tie)
SW	Social Work	67 (tie)

Global Rankings by Subject (as of 2025)
College	Program	Ranking
BAUER	Economics & Business	242
CLASS	Psychiatry/Psychology	249 (tie)
CLASS	Social Sciences & Public Health	247 (tie)
CULLEN	Civil Engineering	194 (tie)
CULLEN	Electrical & Electronic Engineering	59
CULLEN	Energy & Fuels	294
CULLEN	Engineering	221 (tie)
CULLEN	Materials Science	185 (tie)
CULLEN	Nanoscience & Nanotechnology	274
CULLEN	Neuroscience & Behavior	492
EDU	Public, Environmental & Occupational Health	454
MED	Clinical Medicine	505 (tie)
NSM	Biology & Biochemistry	655 (tie)
NSM	Chemistry	354
NSM	Computer Science	300
NSM	Environment/Ecology	692 (tie)
NSM	Geosciences	244 (tie)
NSM	Physical Chemistry	281 (tie)
NSM	Physics	507 (tie)

School	Founded	2022 Undergraduate Enrollment	2022 Graduate Enrollment
University of Houston	1927	37,282	9,418
Medicine	2019	N/A	120
Pharmacy	1946	N/A	550
Law	1947	N/A	825
Optometry	1952	N/A	419
Architecture	1956	824	89
Business	1942	6,369	1,189
Engineering	1941	3,209	1,659
Education	1945	2,663	850
Public Affairs	1981	47	45
Social Work	1967	N/A	544
Arts	2016	1,082	247
Liberal arts & Social Sciences	2000	10,621	980
Natural Sciences	1975	4,789	1,100
Technology	1941	4,704	549
Hospitality	1969	633	127
Nursing	2015	277	102

== Research ==
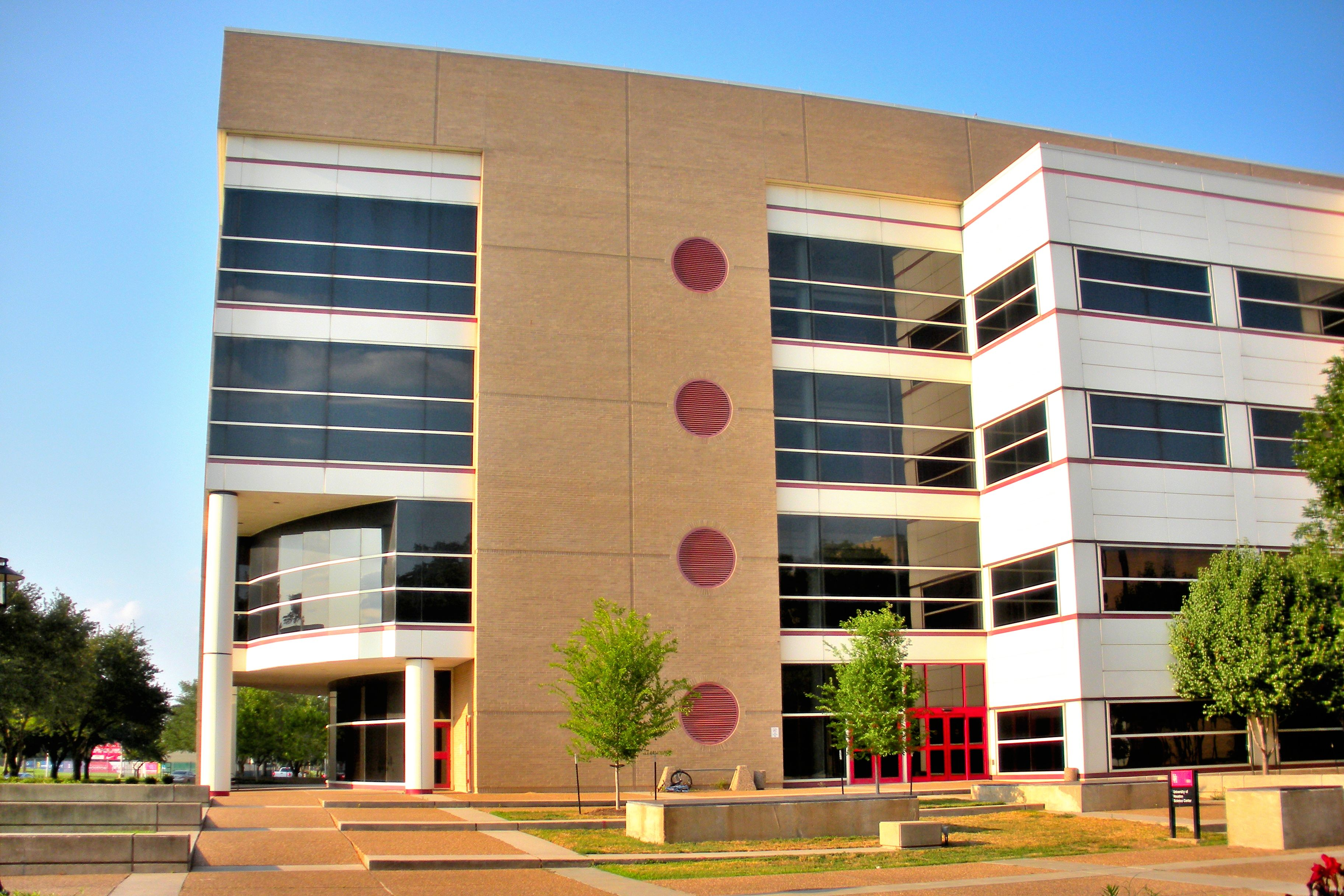
Houston Science Center

The Carnegie Foundation classifies UH as a doctoral degree-granting institution with "highest research activity". The designation recognizes it as one of only nine universities in Texas with the classification.

According to the National Science Foundation, UH spent $177 million on research and development in 2018, ranking it 123rd in the nation. It operates more than 40 research centers and institutes on campus, and through these facilities, UH maintains partnerships with government, health care and private industry. Areas of interdisciplinary research include nanotechnology, superconductivity, space commercialization and exploration, biomedical sciences and engineering, energy and natural resources, and artificial intelligence.

The university has five institutional research thrusts to address several research challenges aimed at economic development and improving the quality of life. The five thrusts include: Cyber and Physical Security, Drug Discovery and Development, Sustainable Communities and Infrastructure, Energy Security and Transition, and Accessible Health Care.

In 2018, UH launched its 50in5 initiative. Led by the Provost Paula Short and Vice President for Research Amr Elnashai, the university is working to increase research by 50 percent in five years. This includes the doubling of UH's national centers from five to 10, thereby improving its position for the Association of American University's membership.

In 2022, UH received $4 million for the expansion of its Center of Economic Inclusion.

== Student life ==
Undergraduate demographics as of Fall 2023
Race and ethnicity	Total
Hispanic	38%
Asian	24%
White	17%
Black	11%
International student	5%
Two or more races	3%
Unknown	1%
Economic diversity
Low-income (Note: The percentage of students who received an income-based federal Pell grant intended for low-income students.)	42%
Affluent (Note: The percentage of students who are a part of the American middle class at the bare minimum.)	58%

=== Art, music and theatre ===
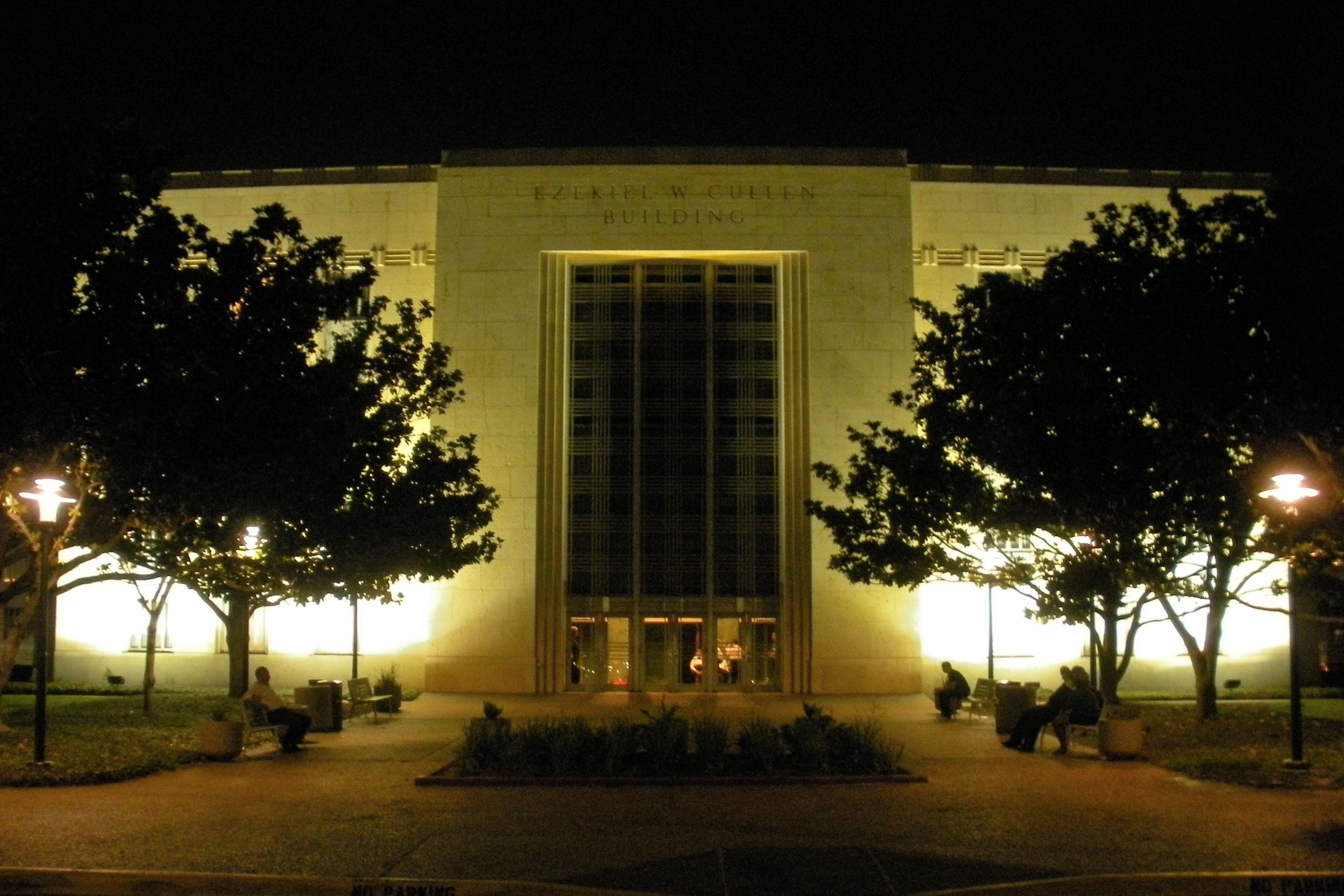
Cullen Performance Hall

Located in the Fine Arts Building, Blaffer Art Museum is a contemporary art museum dedicated to emerging, mid-career, and underrepresented artists and bodies of work through exhibitions, publications, and public programs. Its educational programs include public lectures, artists' talks, docent tours, audio guides, and youth programs such as Studio Saturday, Summer Arts, and the Young Artist Apprenticeship Program.

The Cullen Performance Hall is a 1,612 seat proscenium theater located near Entrance 1. The hall offers a variety of events sponsored by departments and organizations at the university in addition to contemporary music concerts, opera, modern dance, and theatrical performances put on by groups in and outside the Houston area.

The Moores School of Music presents concerts in various campus venues: Dudley Recital Hall and the Organ Recital Hall in the Fine Arts Building, and in the Moores Opera House and Choral Recital Hall in the music building. Musical events range from opera to jazz with performers including students, faculty, and guest artists.

The School of Theatre and Dance offers a subscription series of five plays each year. Works by classical and modern dramatists, as well as new musical collaborators, are seen in full productions or "gypsy runthroughs".

The School of Art exhibits young artists several times a year, including the Master of Fine Arts exhibition held traditionally near the end of the spring semester in the Blaffer Art Museum. The School of Art also hosts presentations by numerous visiting artists and art historians throughout the academic year.

=== Housing ===
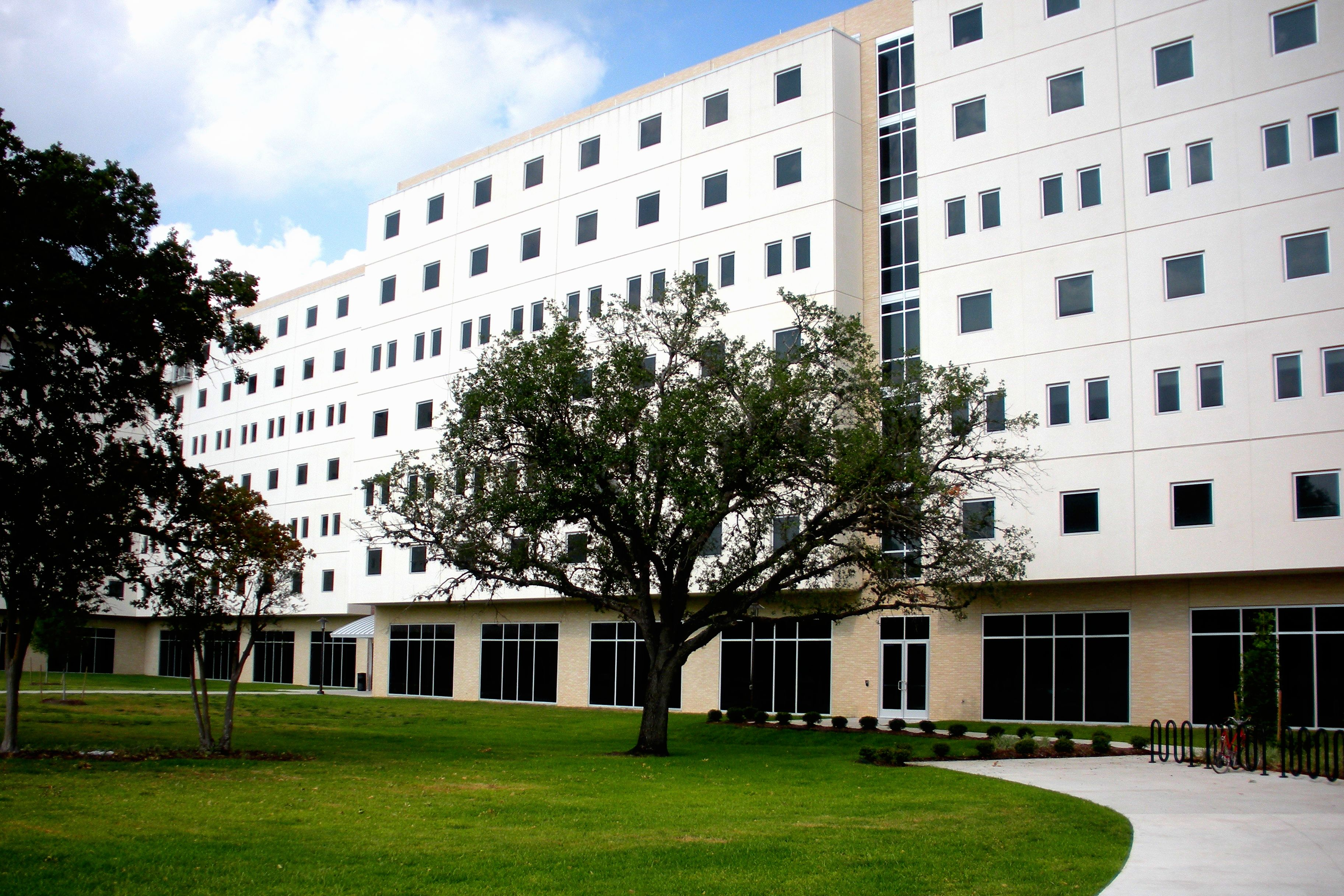
Cougar Village I

UH has several on campus dormitories: Moody Towers, The Quad, Cougar Village I & II, Cougar Place, University Lofts, Bayou Oaks, Cullen Oaks, and Cambridge Oaks.

Moody Towers, frequently just called "Moody", is one of the tallest complexes on campus and the largest area of residence halls. Each of the two towers consists of eighteen stories and together house 1,100 students. The Towers feature a newly renovated dining hall. The rooms in Moody were renovated during the summer of 2011.

The Quad is the newest dorm on campus, having been completed in the Fall of 2020. Named after the former dorms, "The Quadrangle", there are laundry facilities on each floor, as well as a recreational facility, computer lab, and an outdoor courtyard. An extension of The Quad, the Townhouses are single-student dorms right across from The Quad. In total, The Quad and Townhouses combine for 7 buildings that house almost 1,200 students.

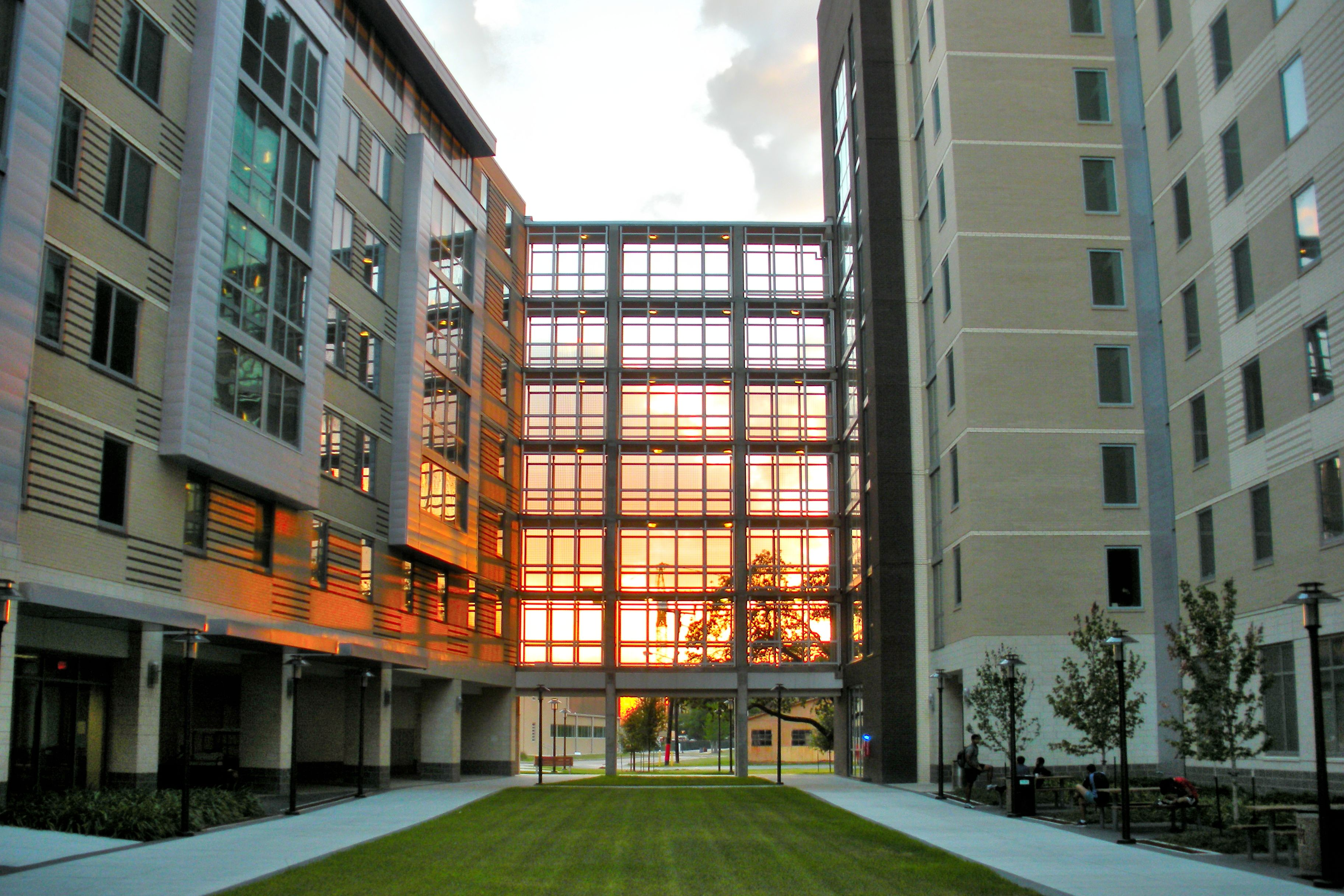
Calhoun Lofts

In August 2009, University Lofts—a university-owned and operated residential facility aimed at graduate and professional students—opened and includes retail stores, lecture halls, and recreation facilities.

Cougar Village I & II are a freshman, including first year Honors students, dorm which opened in August 2010 and August 2013, respectively. The dormitory features themed floors with kitchens and lounges, a tutoring center, computer labs, multi-purpose rooms, study areas, a convenience store, a laundry facility, and a fitness center. Cougar Village I & II are exclusive only to freshman and Honors College students.

In addition to traditional dormitories, Cougar Place was an apartment-style housing complex consisting of 400 units. Cougar Place has since been demolished as of 2013 and has been replaced with a new on-campus housing complex for sophomores. The university has privately owned apartment complexes on campus: Cullen Oaks, Bayou Oaks, and Cambridge Oaks.

In June 2017, a divided panel of the United States Court of Appeals for the Fifth Circuit found that the university did not violate the Constitution's Due Process Clause or Title IX when it expelled both a student for committing a campus sexual assault in a dorm room then abandoning the nude victim in a dorm elevator, as well as his girlfriend, who had recorded the assault and shared the video on social media.

=== Media ===
The official student newspaper is The Cougar, formerly The Daily Cougar, and has been published since 1927. Students also produce the Houstonian magazine, which is for graduating students; Cooglife, a monthly lifestyle magazine; and Transitions, a magazine for incoming students.

CoogTV is a live student-run TV network that appears on the University of Houston cable network.

CoogRadio, UH's student-run college radio station, made its debut on August 29, 2011.

== Traditions ==
Collegiate symbol and heritage mark

The seal of the University of Houston, officially adopted in 1938, is a stylized version of the coat-of-arms of General Sam Houston. The first official version was placed on the floor of the Roy Gustav Cullen Building.

UH's official colors are scarlet red and albino white. These were the colors of Sam Houston's ancestor, Sir Hugh de Paduinan, and were adopted by UH at the same time as the official seal. Scarlet red symbolizes courage or inner strength to face the unknown, and white symbolizes the goodness and purity of spirit embodied in helping one's fellow man.

Cougar Red Friday is part of the ongoing Keep Houston Red initiative at the University of Houston. Students and staff are encouraged to wear red shirts on Friday to show pride for the university.

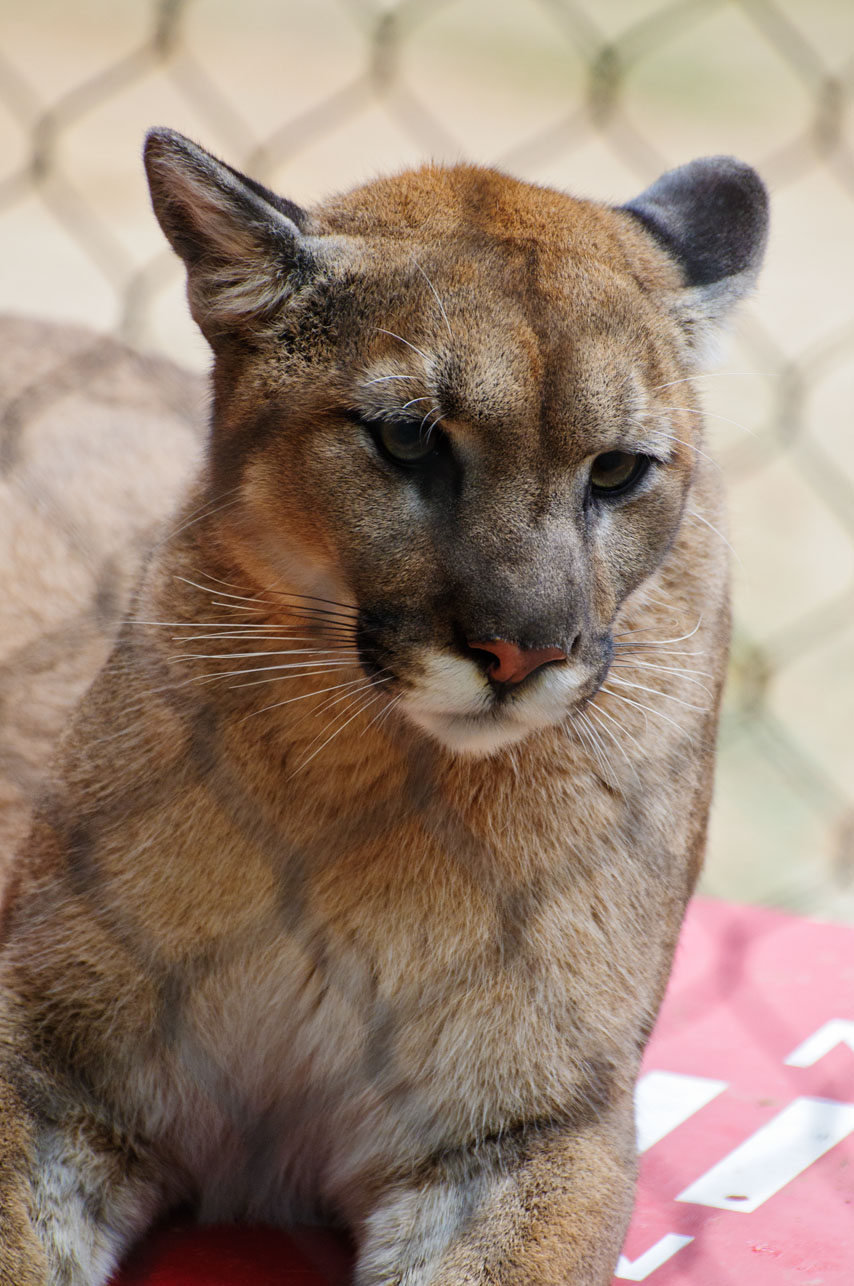
Shasta VI at the Houston Zoo, 2011

The school's official mascot is a cougar, which was adopted in 1947 and later named Shasta. The university owned a series of female cougars, but this tradition ceased in 1989, upon the death of Shasta V. When a cougar cub was orphaned in Washington State and moved to the Houston Zoo in 2011, the university adopted it as its first live male cougar mascot and he was named Shasta VI. Shasta VI died in August 2022 from a progressive spinal disease. In November of the same year, the Houston Zoo received two orphaned male cubs from Washington State Fish & Wildlife Services and decided the cubs would carry the long-standing tradition of representing the University of Houston as Shasta VII and Louie.

The Frontiersmen—initially exclusive to members of the Sigma Chi fraternity, but later opened membership to the entire student body—is a group of students who participate in university events to drive school spirit. At football games, the Frontiersmen—donning cowboy hats, jeans and dusters for attire—run across the field with the university's flag and the Texas flag after each score.

The BLAZE is an oil field warning siren, operated by the Frontiersmen, that was chosen to represent the university's ties to the petroleum industry. The purchase of the siren was completed in 1991. The Sigma Chi Fraternity has overseen the siren and gave it the name "The BLAZE" in honor of its fallen brother, David Blazek.

Frontier Fiesta—a re-creation of a 19th-century Western town, with music, food and historical exhibits—is a major event on campus each spring semester. The student-led festival is a part of a long-standing tradition dating back to the 1940s established by Gan Bey which later became the Sigma Chi Fraternity's Epsilon Xi chapter at UH. Frontier Fiesta attained widespread notoriety when the Sigma Chi variety show performance known as "Bella Union" garnered national attention on the cover of Life magazine as "The Greatest College Show on Earth" and soon-after drew crowds numbered in the tens of thousands from all across the country to participate in the festivities.

Cougar First Impressions—a program headed by the UH Staff Council—takes place every year on the first two days of classes, when faculty and staff turn out to welcome new and returning students.

Weeks of Welcome is another program welcoming students to the university. Over the span of two weeks, departments and student organizations help students learn more about the university with a variety of events.

=== The Cougar Paw ===
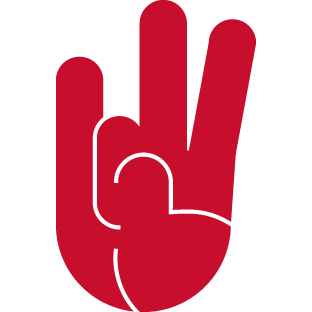
Graphic representation of The Cougar Paw

The Cougar Paw is a popular hand sign used by University of Houston students, faculty, alumni, and athletics fans to represent camaraderie and support. The Cougar Paw tradition was adopted through several athletics events between the University of Houston and the University of Texas.

The University of Houston and the University of Texas played their first football game against one another in 1953. Since this was their first meeting, members of Alpha Phi Omega—the service fraternity in charge of taking care of Shasta I, the university's mascot—brought her to the game. During the trip, Shasta's front paw was caught in the car door and one toe was cut off. At the game, several Longhorn players saw what had happened and began taunting UH players by holding up their hands with the ring finger bent, suggesting the Cougars were invalids. Texas went on to win this game 28–7. UH students had been using the victory sign as a hand signal up to that time but they began using the bent-finger sign as a reminder that they would remember the taunts.

The Cougars did not play the Longhorns again until 1968. With UH fans holding up the new sign of Cougar pride, UH played UT to a 20–20 tie. They didn't meet again until 1976, the first year UH was a member of the Southwest Conference. In front of a record crowd at Texas' Memorial Stadium, UH defeated UT 30–0, a rout that signaled the beginning of the end for legendary Texas coach Darrell Royal. This solidified the use of the Cougar Paw as a tradition.

== Athletics ==
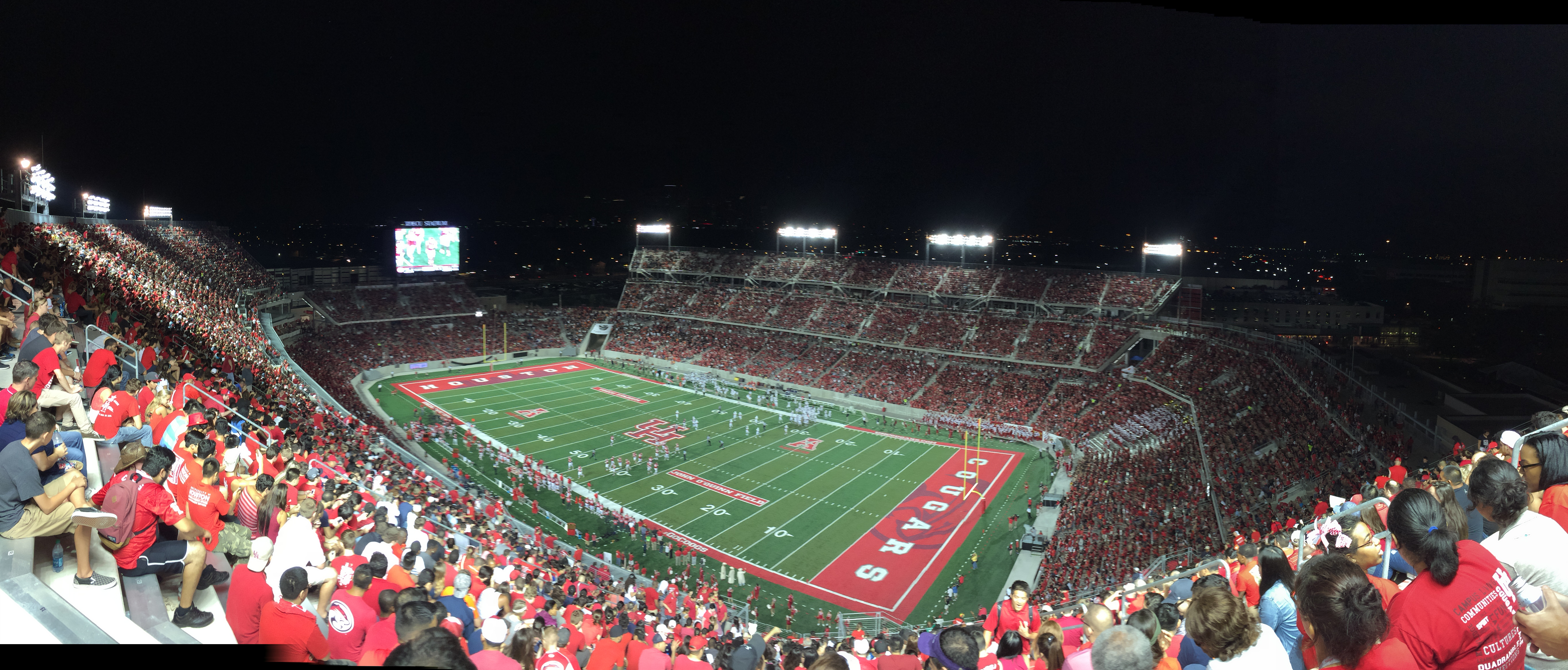
TDECU Stadium, home of the Houston Cougars football team

UH's 17-sport intercollegiate program is a member of the Big 12 Conference. Houston was previously a member of Conference USA, of which it was a member from the time the conference was formed in 1995 until 2013, when they joined the American Athletic Conference. During that time span, the Cougars won 33 C-USA titles. Prior to 1995, Houston was a member of the Southwest Conference.

After more than 75 years of athletics at UH, other notable achievements include 16 national titles in men's golf, one national title in cross country, seven NCAA Men's Basketball Final Four appearances, and two College World Series appearances. More than 75 Olympic athletes have attended UH, bringing home 41 medals, including 20 gold.

UH has many recreational sport clubs, including rugby, NCWA wrestling, soccer, tennis, water polo, kendo, esports and gymnastics.

In addition to varsity sports, the University of Houston offers a variety of intramural sports programs.

=== Varsity sports ===
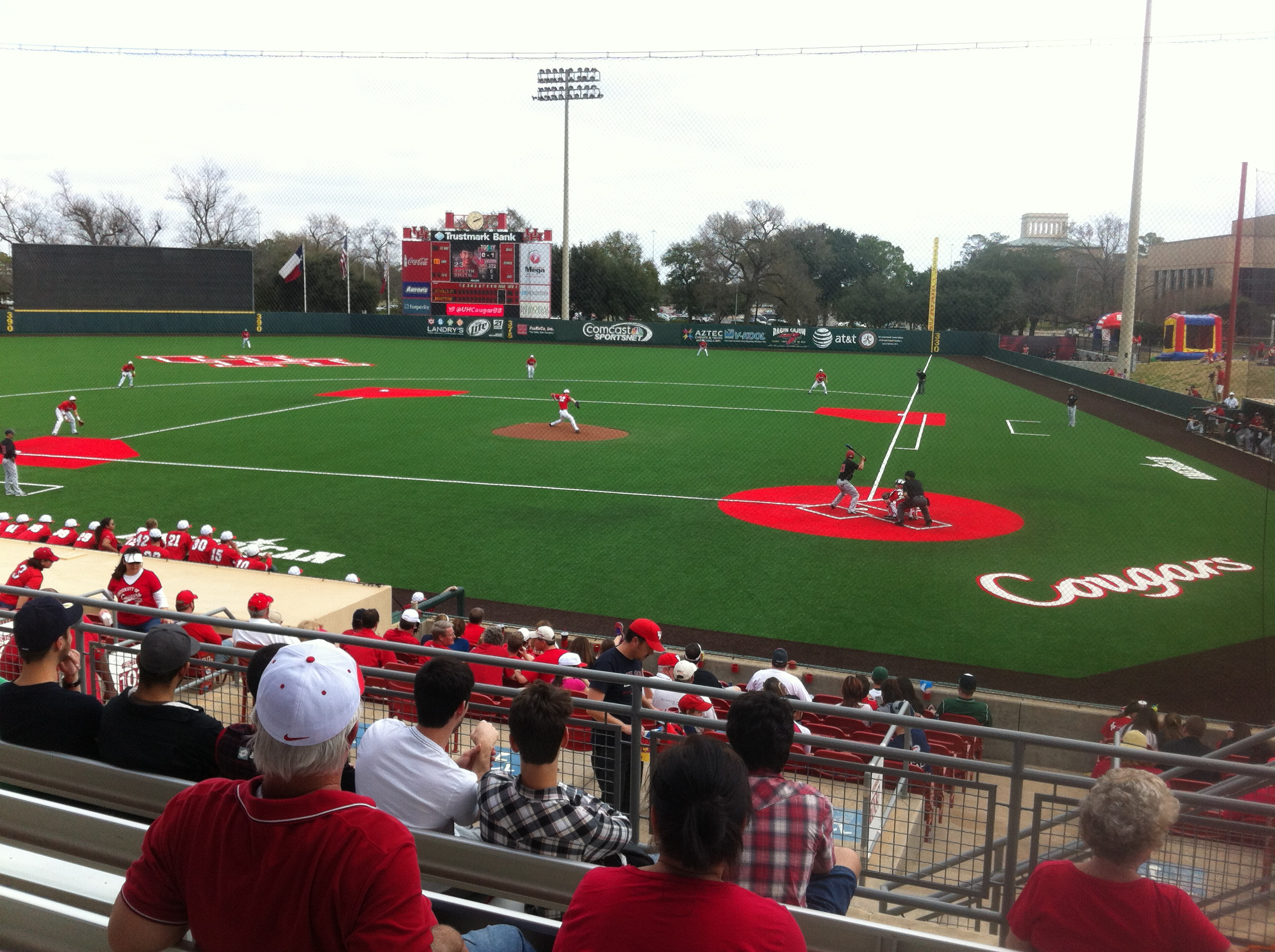
Schroeder Park, home of the Houston Cougars baseball team

The university has an intercollegiate sports program that competes in the National Collegiate Athletic Association (NCAA). The NCAA's Division I sports at the University of Houston include baseball, basketball, cross country, American football, golf, and track and field for men; basketball, cross country, soccer, softball, swimming and diving, tennis, and track and field for women.

The Houston Cougars football team has made 31 post-season bowl appearances and has to its credit several Southwest Conference championships and Cotton Bowl Classic appearances, as well as the 2006 Conference USA Championship and the 2015 American Athletic Conference championship. The 1989 Heisman Trophy winner, Andre Ware, was a Cougar.

The men's basketball team has made 26 NCAA Tournament appearances, with seven trips to the Final Four. See also Phi Slama Jama, the Cougars teams of the early 1980s that featured future NBA legends Clyde Drexler and Hakeem Olajuwon.

Houston competes with other notable sports teams, such as the baseball team, which has made 21 NCAA Tournament appearances with two trips to the College World Series; the men's golf team, which has won 16 NCAA National Championships; the women's soccer team, which was rated as the top first-year women's program in the country in 1998; the swimming and diving teams, which have spawned multiple Olympians and All-Americans; the track and field team, which perennially ranks in the top 10 as an NCAA team; and the volleyball team, which had a streak of ten consecutive trips to the NCAA Tournament.

== Notable people ==
Notable University of Houston alumni include:

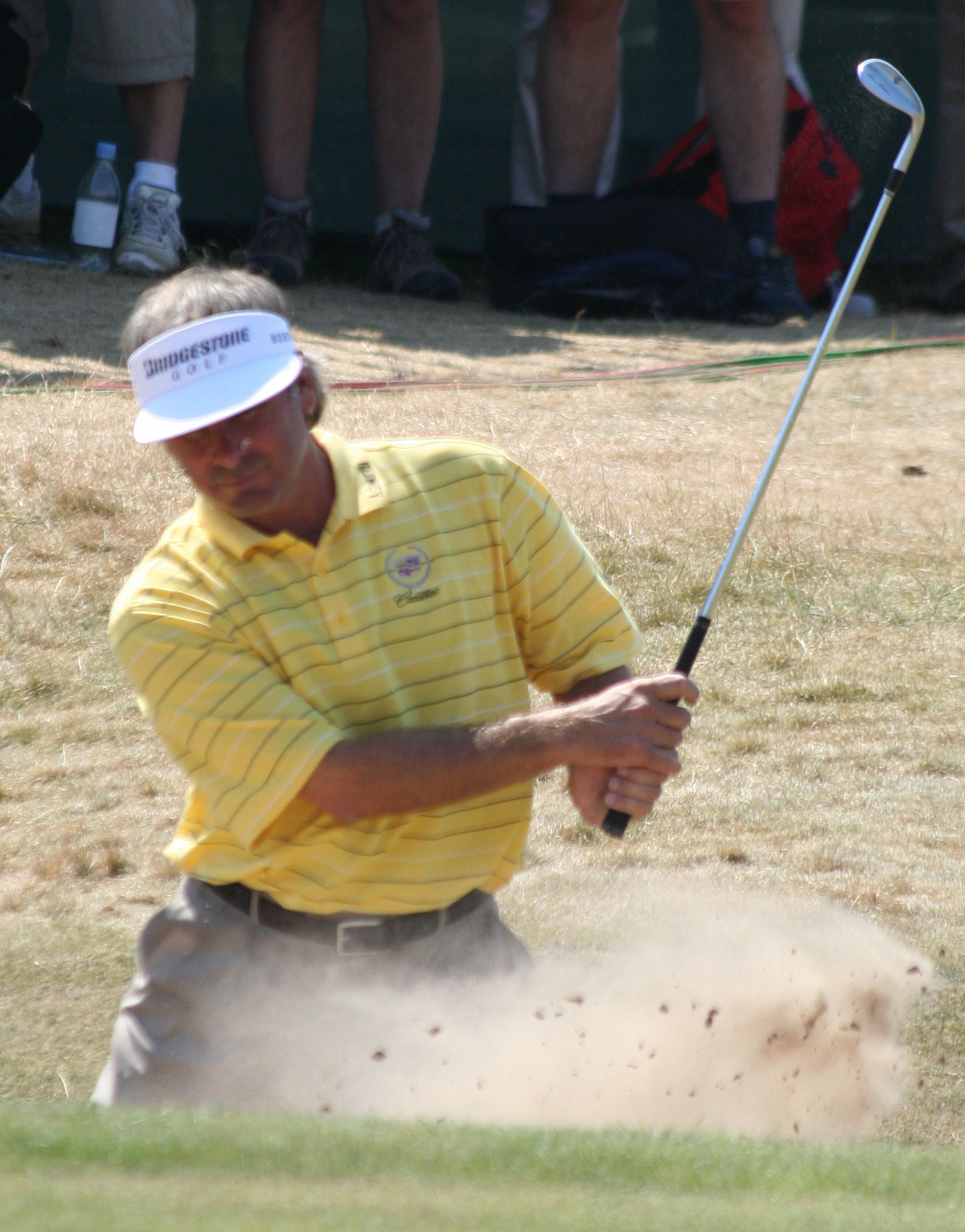
Fred Couples, professional golfer

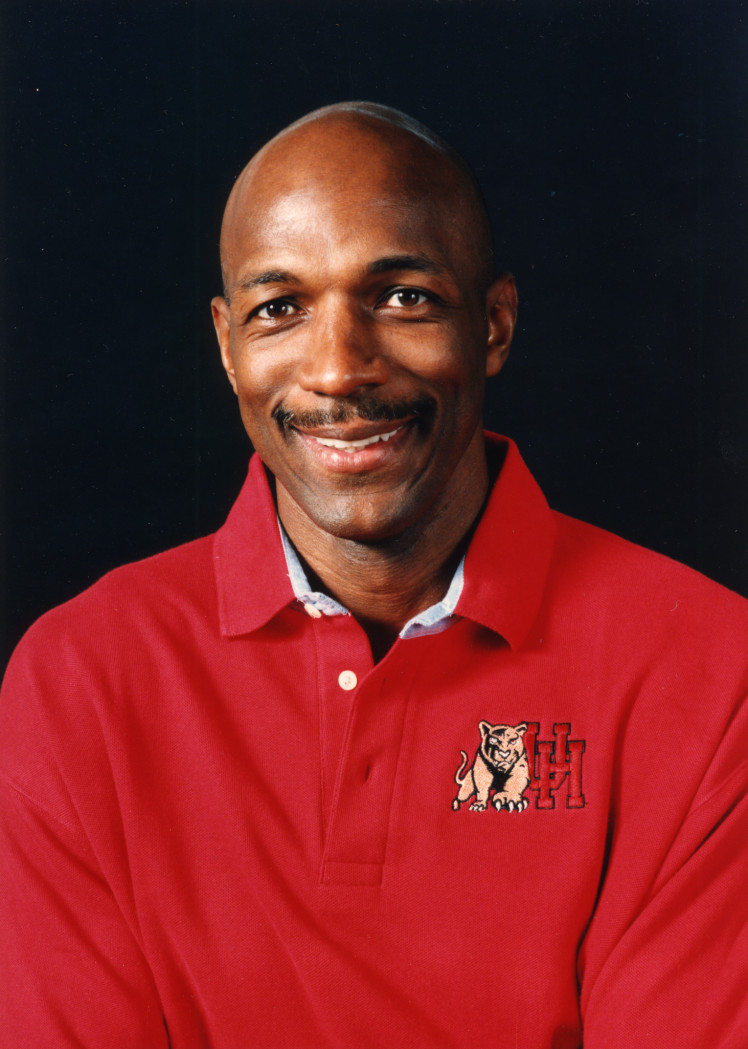
Clyde Drexler, Basketball Hall of Fame member

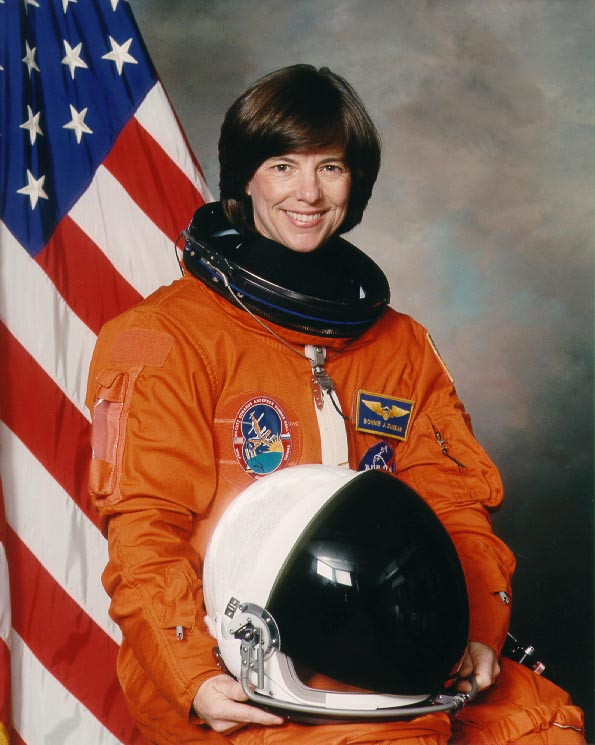
Bonnie J. Dunbar, former NASA astronaut

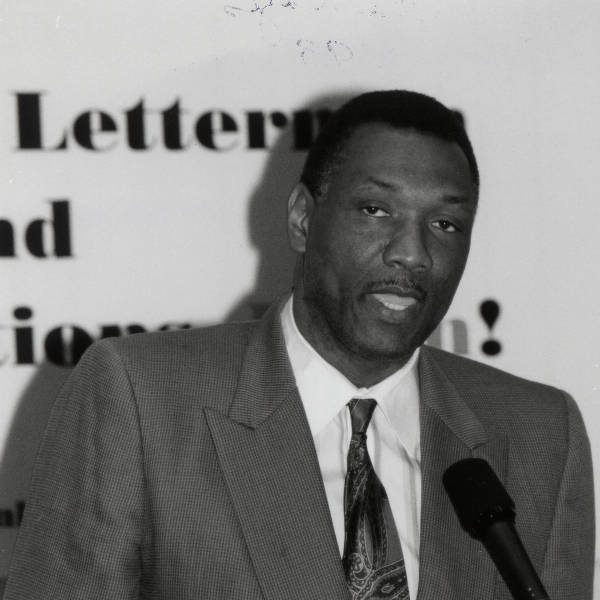
Elvin Hayes, 12-time NBA All-Star

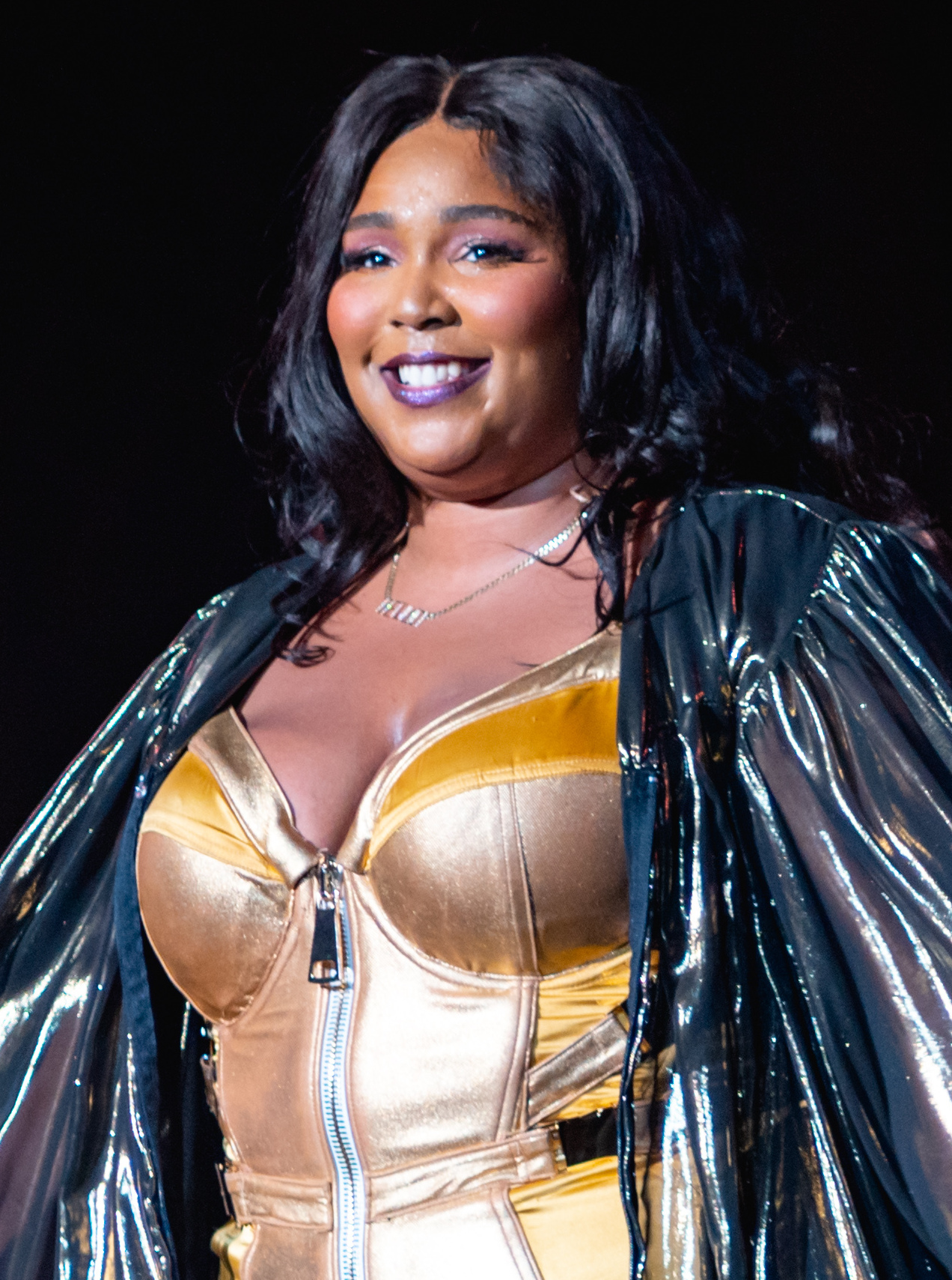
Lizzo, Grammy Award-winning singer

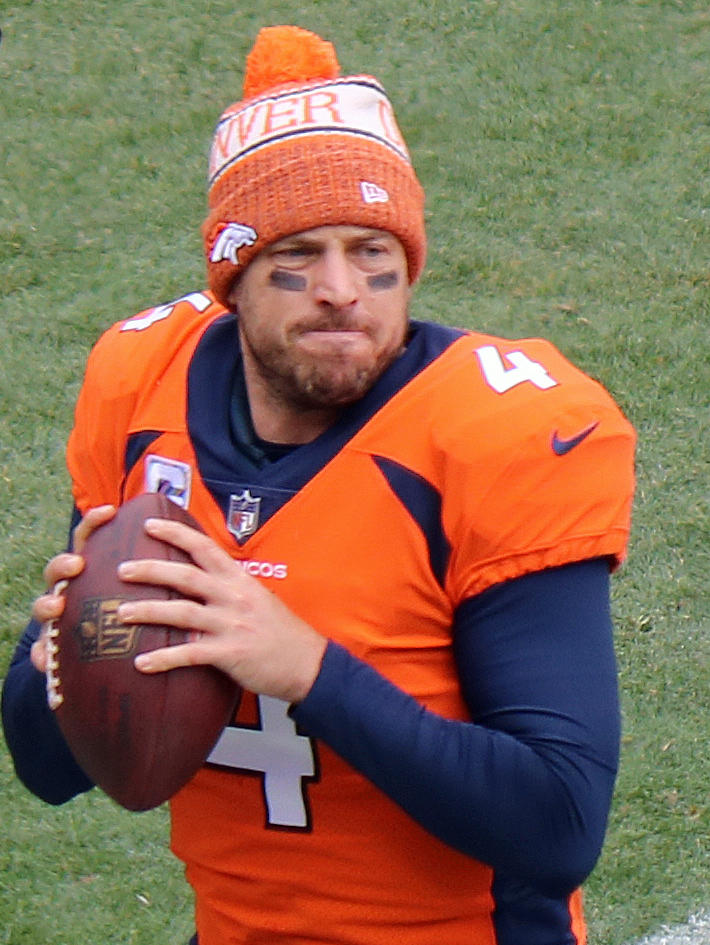
Case Keenum, NFL Quarterback

Jim Nantz, CBS Sports broadcaster

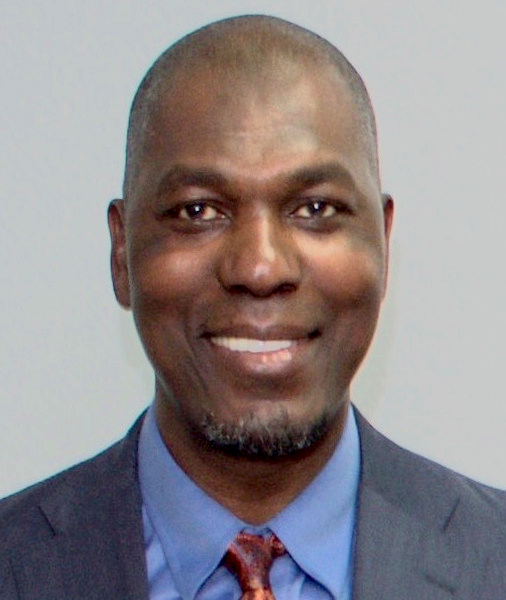
Hakeem Olajuwon, 1994 NBA MVP

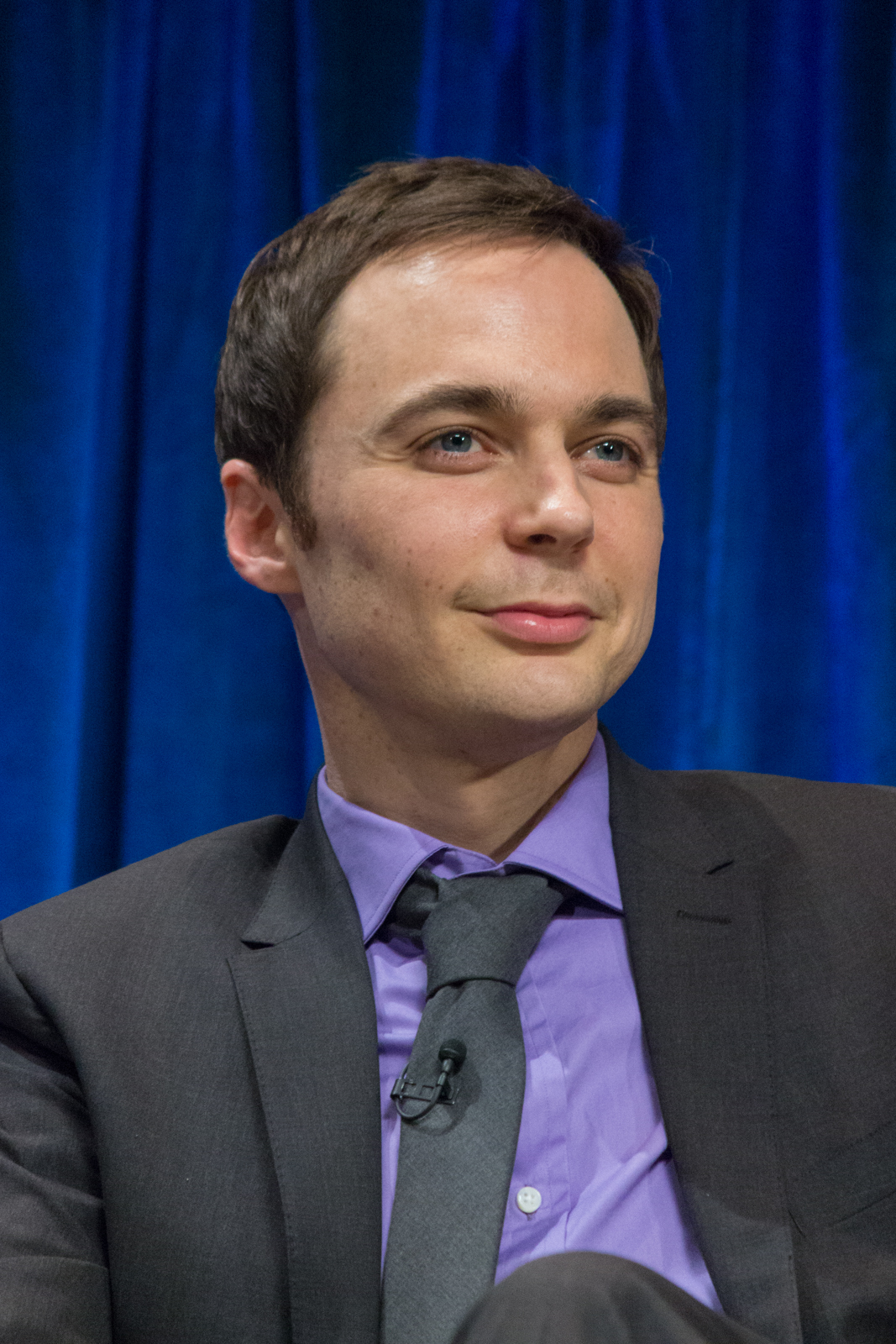
Jim Parsons, Emmy Award-winning actor

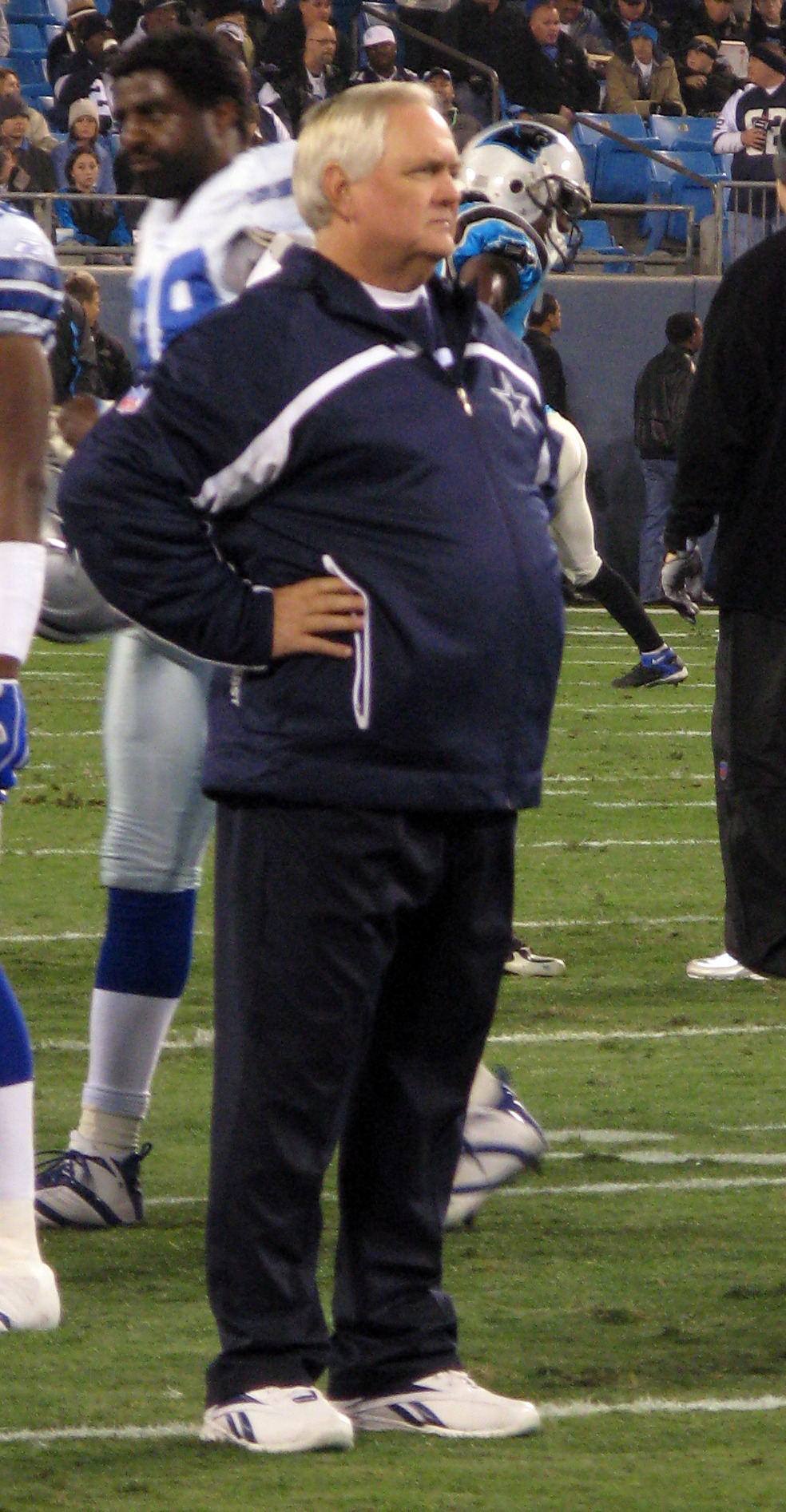
Wade Phillips, NFL Coach

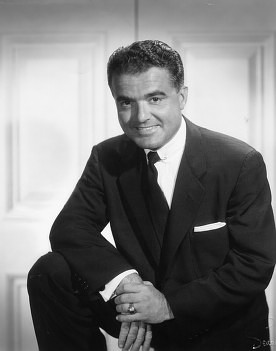
Jack Valenti, former president of the Motion Picture Association

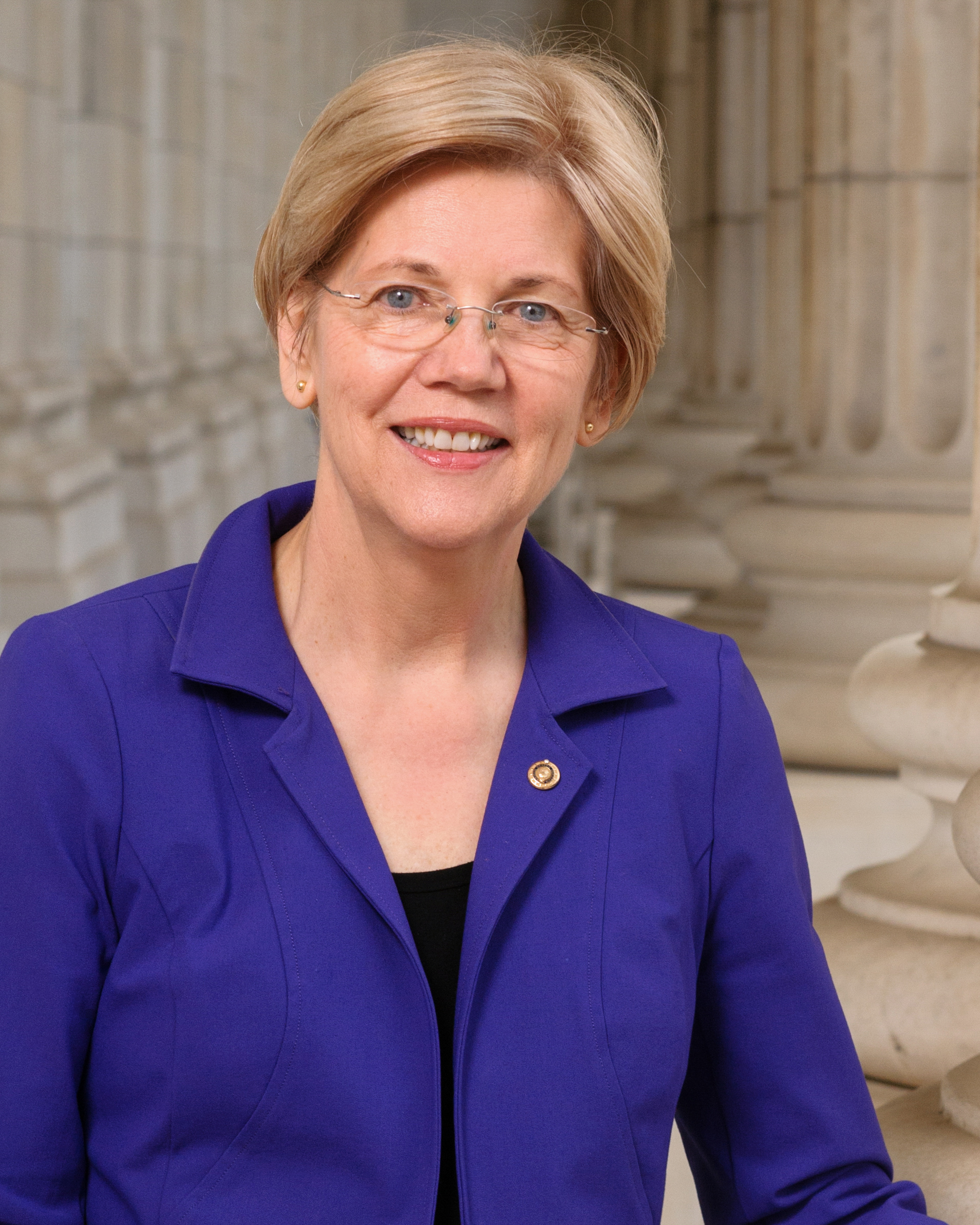
Elizabeth Warren, U.S. Senator from Massachusetts

Jack Valenti, long-time president of the Motion Picture Association of America, creator of the MPAA film rating system, and a special assistant in the Lyndon B. Johnson administration, received his B.B.A. from UH. Artist and filmmaker Julian Schnabel is also an alumnus.

Alice Sebold, a novelist known for Lucky and The Lovely Bones, and Matt Mullenweg, creator of WordPress (the most popular, open-source blogging platform), also attended the university.

Notable athletes within the list include NFL players Wilson Whitley, Glenn Montgomery, Alfred Oglesby, Craig Veasey, Donnie Avery, David Klingler, Kevin Kolb, Billy Milner, Sebastian Vollmer, Case Keenum, and Heisman Trophy winner Andre Ware; baseball stars Doug Drabek, Michael Bourn, and Brad Lincoln; golfers Fred Couples, Billy Ray Brown, Steve Elkington, and Fuzzy Zoeller; track and field legends Carl Lewis and Leroy Burrell; NBA basketball players Hakeem "The Dream" Olajuwon, Clyde "The Glide" Drexler and "The Big E" Elvin Hayes as well as Bo Outlaw, Don Chaney, Michael Young, Damon Jones, Carl Herrera and Otis Birdsong; and legendary Dallas Cowboys coach Tom Landry. The owner of the San Diego Padres and noted philanthropist John Moores holds both undergraduate and law degrees. Wade Phillips, a former head coach of the Denver Broncos, Buffalo Bills, and Dallas Cowboys, is a UH alumnus as well.

Notable Texas politicians who are graduates of the UH Political Science program include Alfred H. Bennett, U.S. District Judge of the U.S. District Court for the Southern District of Texas; Carol Alvarado, Texas State senator for District 6; and James White, State Representative Texas House District 19. Other politicians who attended UH include Gene Green, a retired Democratic U.S. congressman from the state of Texas representing its 29th congressional district, which includes most of eastern Houston, along with large portions of Houston's eastern suburbs; and Ted Poe, a Republican politician formerly representing Texas's 2nd congressional district in the United States House of Representatives. Elizabeth Warren, a U.S. senator from Massachusetts and formerly a University of Houston Law Center faculty member, received her B.S. from UH in 1970. Tom DeLay, a former member and majority leader of the U.S. House of Representatives, who represented Texas's 22nd congressional district from 1984 until 2006, also attended the University of Houston. Jasmine Crockett, U.S. representative from Texas's 30th congressional district since January 2023, attended the University of Houston Law Center, graduating in 2006 with a Juris Doctor.

Crystle Stewart, Miss USA 2008 is a former student at the university, last attending in 2007. Jason Alkire, an artist and fashion designer, is a graduate as well. Other alumni include Jim Parsons, star of the television series The Big Bang Theory, Brent Spiner of Star Trek: The Next Generation, actors Robert Wuhl, Loretta Devine, Dennis Quaid, Randy Quaid, Brett Cullen, comedian Bill Hicks and attorney and talk show host Star Jones, Project Runway contestants Chloe Dao and Laura Bennett, sportscasters Jim Nantz and Robert Flores, YouTubers Bunny Meyer and Liza Koshy, South Asian American singer Shahzeb Tejani, singer and rapper Lizzo, and country music stars Larry Gatlin and Kenny Rogers. Dwayne Michael Carter Jr., aka Lil Wayne, is a hip-hop artist from New Orleans. He enrolled in 2005 but dropped out shortly after.
