= Roy G. Cullen Building =

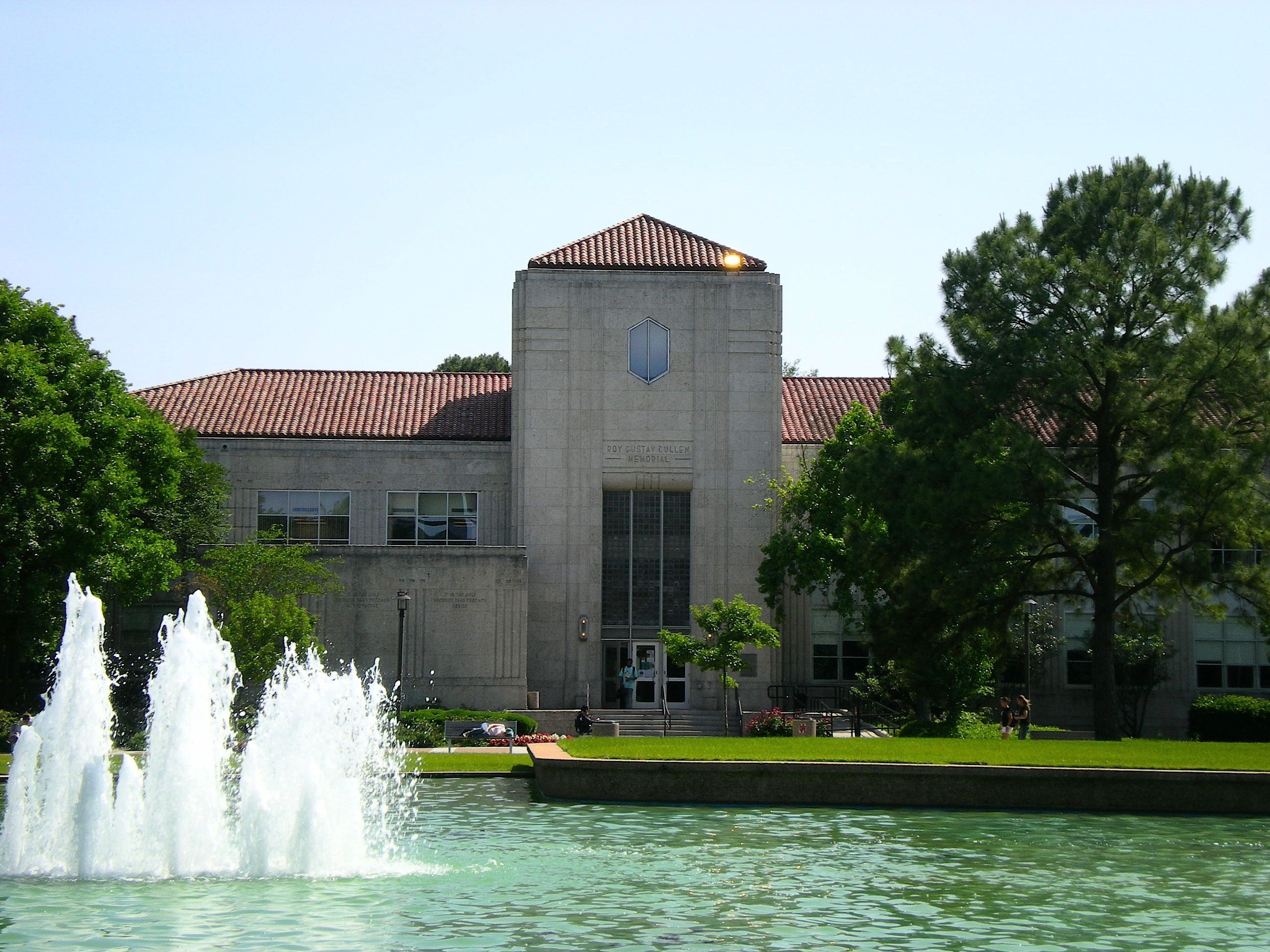
- Roy G. Cullen Building across from the Cullen Family Plaza
- Interactive map of the Roy G. Cullen Building area

General information
- Architectural style: Art Deco
- Location: Houston, Texas, United States
- Coordinates: 29.72002°N 95.34478°W
- Current tenants: University of Houston
- Construction started: 1938
- Completed: 1939
- Owner: University of Houston System

Design and construction
- Architect: Lamar Q. Cato

The Roy G. Cullen Building (dedicated as Roy Gustav Cullen Memorial Building) is the oldest building on the present-day campus of the University of Houston. It is believed to be the first building on a campus of higher education in the United States with air conditioning. Construction for the building began in 1938, and was completed the following year.

== History ==
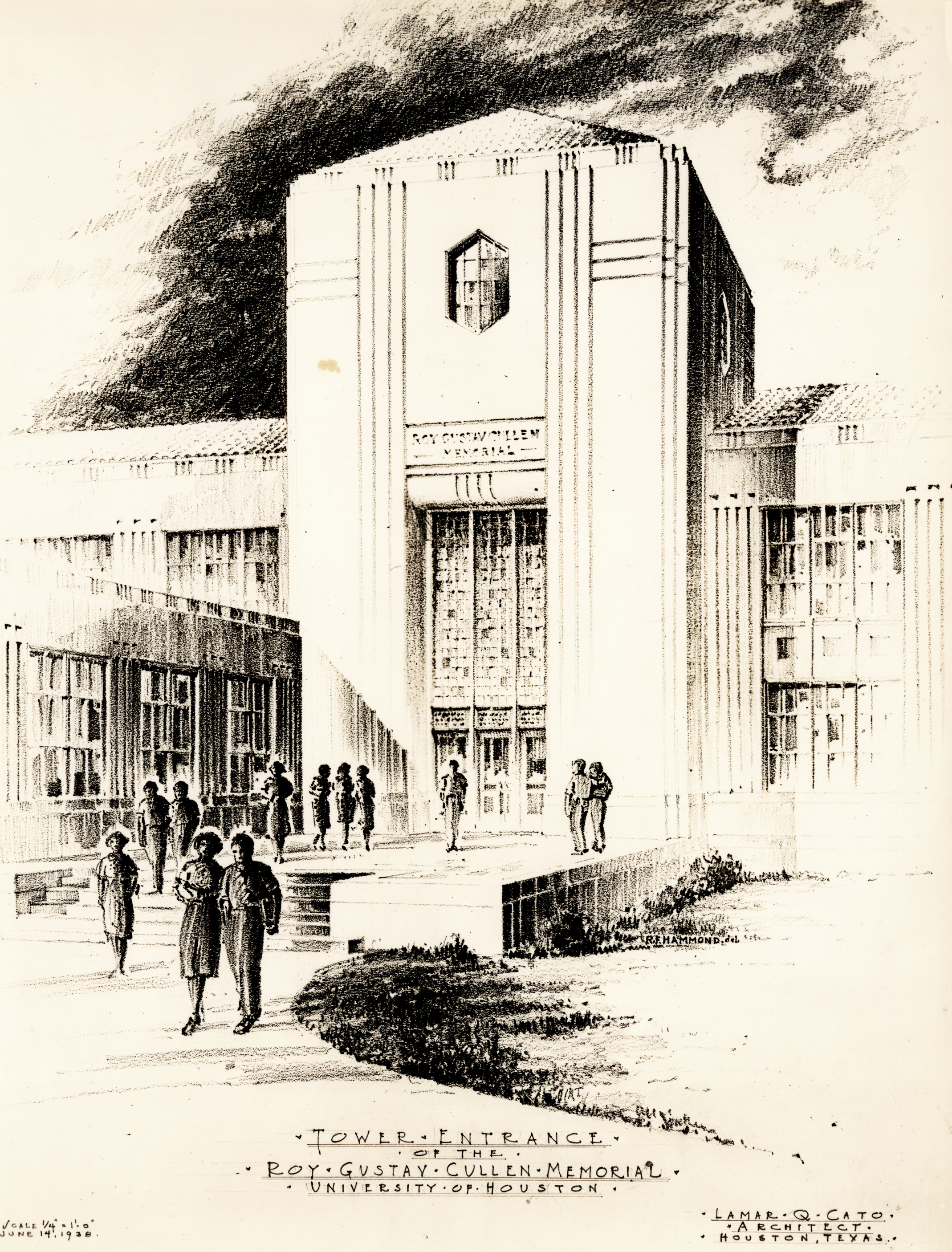
A preliminary drawing of the tower entrance to the Roy G. Cullen Building by its architect in 1938

From its inception in 1927, the University of Houston did not have a dedicated campus. In 1936, when the university was still located at South Main Baptist Church, Houston philanthropists Julius Settegast and Ben Taub donated conjoining pieces of land totaling 110 acres (45 hectares) to the university. This land was to be used as a permanent campus for the University of Houston.

Although land had been donated to the university, it was not until two years later that the university was able to build on the location. Hugh Roy Cullen—a wealthy businessman—and his wife Lillie Cullen donated a combined $335,000 for the first permanent building to be built at the campus. The building was named the "Roy Gustav Cullen Memorial Building" as a memorial to the Cullens' only son who had died in an oil field accident two years earlier. H.R. Cullen would later serve as Chairman of the Board of Regents for the university—and before his death in 1957—had donated over $11 million to the University of Houston.
