= CoogTV =

Student TV station at the University of Houston, Texas

- Country: United States
- Broadcast area: Houston, Texas
- Affiliates: CoogRadio, The Cougar

Programming
- Language: American English
- Picture format: 1080i (HDTV)

Ownership
- Owner: University of Houston

History
- Launched: 1974
- Former names: SVN, Student Video Network, Channel6

Links
- Website: http://www.coogtv.com

Availability

Streaming media
- On the internet: http://www.CoogTV.com
- Facebook: https://www.facebook.com/CoogTV/

CoogTV formerly known as SVN (Student Video Network) is a student television station at the University of Houston, Texas, United States. Founded in 1974, it is one of several fee-funded organizations on campus, and broadcasts online through its web site and on the University of Houston's Cougar Philo cable network.

== Station history ==
iSVN began broadcasting in 1974 from one of the former facilities for Houston PBS member station KUHT. In 1985, KUHT reclaimed the building and the student operated television station was shut down. Several members of that organization decided to pull resources together and create their own student operated video network on campus. They decided to work under Campus Activities to increase their chance of survival. In the early 1990s students were able to come to the Student Video Network and create their own productions that were then aired on a closed-circuit television station available to all students living in on-campus housing.

Student Video Network started to come to prominence on campus during the mid 1990s, beginning under the leadership of Eden S. Blair who served as Chair from 1993 - 1995. Purchasing an AVID editing machine before the Communications Department meant SVN became a training ground for students who wanted to learn how to edit using industry standard equipment.

Blair opted not to go for a third year as chair and was followed by Nicole Redo for the 1995 - 1996 school year. Redo continued the relationship with the dean of students office maintaining the UH News program. She also expanded SVN's community involvement by televising a live debate between candidates for Student Association President and allowing parties to air commercials.

In 2001, Tropical Storm Allison flooded out the entire studio, damaging equipment, software, and the SVN facilities beyond repair. In 2003, University of Houston's Campus Activities decided to restart the program, only playing new video releases with the future intent of bringing back student productions.

In 2006, Gus Forward, a Business Administration undergrad, worked with Campus Activities advisors as the first President of the relaunched organization. Gus enabled students to work on original productions and increased the production equipment inventory of the TV station.

In the summer of 2007, Gus Forward stepped down and Tommy Lee Kirby, a Media Production undergrad, took over and worked on increasing operating space and continued to obtain new video equipment. Also during Tommy’s tenure, the Outdoor Movie Festival was started by Commercial Director, Jeremy Malhotra. The Outdoor Movie Festival showcases newly released and classic movies in various venues on campus and is open for all students and staff to attend. Past venues include the Lynn Eusan Park on campus and the UC North Patio. SVN collaborates with other Campus Activities organizations and student groups to provide popcorn, snacks, drinks, and raffle giveaways to attendees.

At the start of the 2008 school year, Luis Gonzalez assumed the position of SVN President after being the Vice President under Tommy Lee Kirby. Under his tenure, Luis restructured the organization for better efficiency and established a relationship with the UH School of Theatre & Dance. His Vice President of Operations, Cole Calza, worked extensively with the Jack J. Valenti School of Communication to help strengthen the relationship between the two organizations. Cole also pushed hard to increase the funding granted to SVN from Campus Activities. The Vice President of Public Relations, Hammad Ahmed, worked with UH Athletics to establish an agreement which allowed SVN to broadcast copyrighted game footage on the campus TV channel. In addition, he expanded the size and scope of the, now semi-annual, Outdoor Movie Festival. During his tenure, Hammad also initiated his vision to bring a World Trade Center Memorial to the University of Houston. This vision was finally realized with the help of the UH Student Government Association in January 2014. The memorial sits in the Reflection Garden in front of the UC South Theatre entrance.

In October 2009, when Luis resigned from his post, Viral Bhakta became the new President of SVN. He increased the educational and production aspects of the organization for its members and the university. He established weekly production classes to give members hands of training and created various production, pre-production, and post production guidelines. With this came the opportunity for show producers to better attain marketing and props for their shows.

In 2010, Viral was reselected to serve as the SVN President for another year. Also joining the SVN team was Ali Iqbal, who is the owner and photographer at (Color Digital Studios), as the SVN Production Manager. Viral went on to establish relationships with movie marketing companies Allied Integrated Marketing and Moroch Marketing which brought internship opportunities inside the industry for SVN members.

Student Video Network continues to showcase the semi-annual Outdoor Movie Festival.

In 2014, the brand “CoogTV” was established under the next generation of students, led by Andrew Blake Cochran. It marks the official change in name of the channel/platform. Under the leadership of Blake, original programming like In the Game continued to showcase on the student-ran channel, along with new shows like @UH, the official school news and entertainment program. In the summer of 2014, CoogTV made the jump from local to global by creating an online presence that could be accessed by a much broader audience. With a brand new studio and accompanying work spaces, CoogTV's digital footprint grew with more advanced gear, upgrading the quality of productions overall. Blake was the final President of the organization, with its first official Executive Producer being Cory Rodriguez in Fall 2016. Student leaders within the organization now hold more industry-related titles.

== Productions ==
Students must submit a production proposal form for their idea to be reviewed. If approved, students utilize the SVN studio to tape their show or use the equipment to tape out of the studio. They use the Control room for the postproduction of their show or commercial to finish their project. Shows taped in studio are linearly taped to Final Cut Pro to be edited. Out of studio shows are non-linearly taped onto Mini DV tapes.

SVN offers various production forms to help students have a guideline from the very beginning of production to broadcasting the final product.

=== Production process ===
Production Guidelines

This guideline helps outline deadlines for specific for document, copyrights, censorship, producer policies, and management during pre-production to post-production. Simply a Producer’s Bible for productions. (add content- purpose, pp what is, how, why)

Production Proposal

This form will serve to help students propose a TV show (SVN Original Programming) that they would like to create on SVN. The document contains examples that should help students significantly. (formal proposal meeting, what happens)

Production Packet

This form helps producers stay organized during the creation of each episode. Includes forms such as:

- Photo Release Form – University required form, required when any digital photo or video media is taken.

- Location Release Form – Allows producer to secure a filming location.

- Studio Reservation Form - Allows producer to reserve the SVN studio.

- Equipment Check-Out Form - Allows producers and experienced members to check out equipment. Successfully completed production classes required.

- Broadcast Release Form – Allows producers to receive confirmation when show is being input into broadcasting software.

Once the taping and editing is done for the show, it will be put in the line up and is ready to be shown. (In Spring 2010, SVN has added three shows to its lineup.)

== Notable ==
Interviews

SVN has had the opportunity to interview different celebrities. Recently SVN held a Terriers (TV series) viewing event which was hosted by stars of the show Donal Logue and Michael Raymond-James.
