= Robert Livingston =

Robert, Bob, or Bobby Livingston may refer to:

== Law and politics ==
- Robert Livingston the Elder (1654–1728), American colonial official
- Robert Livingston the Younger (1663–1725), colonial American politician in New York
- Robert Livingston (1688–1775), colonial American politician in New York, a.k.a. Robert of Clermont
- Robert Livingston (1708–1790), colonial American politician in New York
- Robert Livingston (1718–1775), colonial American politician and judge
- Robert R. Livingston (1746–1813), American lawyer and politician
- Robert Le Roy Livingston (1778–1836), American politician
- Robert Livingston (Florida politician) (1835–1869), American politician
- Robert Reginald Livingston (1888–1962), American politician
- Bob Livingston (born 1943), American politician and lobbyist

== Sports ==
- Robert Livingston (ice hockey) (1908–1974), American ice hockey player
- Bobby Livingston (cyclist) (born 1965), American cyclist
- Bobby Livingston (baseball) (born 1982), American baseball player
- Robert Livingston (American football) (born 1985), American football coach

== Others ==
- Robert Gilbert Livingston (1712–1789), American merchant
- Robert James Livingston (1811–1891), American businessman
- Robert L. Livingston (died 1979), American publisher, political aide, and civil rights administrator
- Robert Livingston (actor) (1904–1988), American actor
- Robert Livingston (scientist) (1918–2002), American physician and neuroscientist
- Robert Livingston (Zen teacher) (1933–2021), American Zen teacher
- Bob Livingston (musician) (born 1948), American musician
- Robert W. Livingston, American social psychologist
- Bobby Livingston (auction executive), American auction executive and television personality

== Other uses ==
- SS Robert R. Livingston, American Liberty ship

== See also ==
- Robert Livingstone (disambiguation)
