= Andersen Library =

Andersen Library may refer to:

- Andersen Library (University of Wisconsin Whitewater)
- Elmer L. Andersen Library, University of Minnesota

== See also ==
- MD Anderson Library, University of Houston
