= Bobby Livingston (auction executive) =

American auction executive, appraiser, television personality, and musician

- Born: Robert Livingston Jr. United States
- Occupations: Auction executive, certified appraiser, television personality, musician
- Relatives: Harold Livingston (uncle)
- Website: https://bobbylivingston.com

Bobby Livingston (born Robert Livingston Jr.) is an American auction executive, appraiser, television personality, musician, and former film and advertising producer. He is Executive Vice President, Principal, and Head of Public Relations at RR Auction. He is a nephew of Harold Livingston, a screenwriter credited for Star Trek: The Motion Picture (1979).

== Career ==
He worked as an assistant director under the name Robert Livingston Jr. on Dr. Caligari (1989), an avant-garde horror film directed by Stephen Sayadian.

Livingston joined RR Auction in 2008. He serves as Executive Vice President and Head of Public Relations, responsible for public relations, evaluations, and consignment assessments.

He operates Robert Livingston Appraisals LLC, an appraisal practice.

=== Notable auctions ===
During his tenure at RR Auction, Livingston has served as a spokesperson for auction sales including:

- Bonnie Parker's .38 Special revolver (2012), for which RR Auction worked with the ATF's Boston field division to obtain federal compliance prior to sale.
- Lee Harvey Oswald’s wedding ring, sold in 2013 for $108,000.
- Never-before-published negatives from the 1953 wedding of John F. Kennedy and Jacqueline Kennedy, sold in 2014.
- A seat from a Blue Origin New Shepard spacecraft, sold for $28 million in 2021.
- The Apollo 15 Lunar Surface Chronograph, sold for $1.6 million.
- A Steve Jobs–inscribed Apple II manual, sold for $787,484 in August 2021 to Jim Irsay, owner of the Indianapolis Colts.
- Elon Musk's university graded papers (2021) and memorabilia gifted by Musk to a college girlfriend (2022).
- A handwritten Jacqueline Kennedy letter to John F. Kennedy, donated to the Kennedy Library Foundation in January 2020.
- Two Ford’s Theatre tickets from the night of Abraham Lincoln’s assassination, sold in September 2023 for $262,500 to Jim Irsay.
- 8mm film footage of the 1963 John F. Kennedy assassination motorcade, offered in 2024.
- Jim Sanborn’s complete Kryptos archive, including the solution to the sculpture’s fourth encrypted passage (K4), sold for $962,500 in November 2025.
- RR Auction’s Apple 50th Anniversary sale, Steve Jobs & the Computer Revolution, which generated $8.1 million in January 2026, with the first Apple company check signed by Jobs and Steve Wozniak selling for $2.4 million.
- A 2000 Cadillac DeVille used in The Sopranos, sold through RR Auction for $120,000.
- A 1929 letter written by Albert Einstein to his son, offered for sale by RR Auction in 2016, with an estimated value exceeding US$100,000.
- A 1543 letter by Martin Luther in which he described Jews as “devils incarnate,” offered at auction.

== Media appearances ==
Livingston has been quoted in The New York Times, BBC News, The Boston Globe, NPR, Wired, Variety, Smithsonian Magazine, People magazine, and the Daily Mail.

He has appeared on television programs including NBC’s the Today show, CBS This Morning, CNN, Fox News, and the History Channel, and on series such as Pawn Stars, Strange Inheritance, and Brad Meltzer’s Lost History.

In 2022, he hosted the Fox Nation documentary series Selling History, a seven-episode series following the acquisition and auction preparation of historical artifacts.

== Music career ==
Outside of his auction work, Livingston is a singer-songwriter and bandleader in New Hampshire. He leads the Bobby Livingston Band, formerly known as Napoleon in Rags, a group influenced by Bob Dylan and other artists from the 1960s and 1970s.

The band released its debut album, High and Away, in 2014 and promoted the release at Tupelo Music Hall in Londonderry, New Hampshire.

Livingston has organized benefit concerts supporting the Brad Delp Foundation, raising approximately $15,000 for music education programs.

== Personal life ==
Livingston lives in New Hampshire. His uncle, Harold Livingston (1924–2022), was a screenwriter credited for Star Trek: The Motion Picture (1979). Bobby Livingston confirmed his uncle's death in 2022.
