= M.D. Anderson (disambiguation) =

Monroe Dunaway Anderson was a banker and cotton trader.

M.D. (or MD) Anderson may also refer to:

- University of Texas MD Anderson Cancer Center
- M.D. Anderson Library, the main general collection library of the University of Houston Libraries
