= A,A =

Sculpture by Jim Sanborn

- Artist: Jim Sanborn
- Year: 2004
- Location: University of Houston; 29°43′15″N 95°20′34″W
- Owner: University of Houston System

The A,A is a sculpture by artist Jim Sanborn, located on the campus of the University of Houston, adjacent to the M.D. Anderson Library.

Completed in 2004, it was installed on campus at a reported cost of $240,000. The work of art took the sculptor a year to complete.

The A,A is composed of portions of poems, novels, and prose from a number of different languages from different parts of the world. Some languages included on the art includes Arabic, Russian, Spanish, and Chinese. At night, a built-in light projector casts light through the sculpture. This causes the effect of illuminating the sculpture's text onto the outside of the library's walls.

In addition to the sculpture in front of the M.D. Anderson Library, there are two additions from Sanborn inside the library. These include a 24-foot-long (7.3 m) bronze scroll detailing the history of papermaking that hangs from the ceiling of the first floor and bronze panels along some of the guardrails containing portions of poems and other literature.

== See also ==
- Kryptos
