= Antipodes (sculpture) =

Public artwork by Jim Sanborn

- Artist: Jim Sanborn
- Year: 1997
- Type: Copper and petrified wood
- Dimensions: 240 cm × 190 cm × 66 cm (96 in × 75 in × 26 in)
- Location: Hirshhorn Museum and Sculpture Garden; Washington, D.C., United States; 38°53′16.65″N 77°1′21.22″W
- Owner: Smithsonian Institution

Antipodes is a public artwork by American sculptor Jim Sanborn located outside of the Hirshhorn Museum and Sculpture Garden in Washington, DC, United States.

== Description ==
This sculpture consists of two copper curved pieces attached to a piece of petrified wood by steel bands. The "scrolls" have letters punched into them, one piece is in English and the other piece is "coded" in Cyrillic.

== Acquisition ==
The original Antipodes is a 6-foot high version of the Hirshhorn sculpture that was created in 1992 which was purchased by art collectors Gilbert and Ann Kinney. The small piece was displayed on the terrace of the Kinney home and upon moving the couple donated the piece to the Hirshhorn. In 1997 the Neuberger Museum of Art commissioned a large scale version of Antipodes for the Neuberger Biennial. After the Biennial, Sanborn traded the large piece for the smaller version to the Hirshhorn, hence it now residing outside the Washington-based museum. The smaller version of Antipodes has since been sold to a private collector in California via L.A. Louver.

== Information ==
This sculpture was inspired by Sanborn's Kryptos installation. The two texts refer to CIA and KGB covert operations. The English side of the sculpture repeats the text seen on Kryptos. The Kryptos code is in four parts, three have been solved. However, select differences do exist between the text seen on Antipodes versus Kryptos such as spacing, additional dots and letters.

The Cyrillic side has a large amount of text from another of Sanborn's pieces, Cyrillic Projector, as well as additional text; all of the Cyrillic text has since been solved.

== Gallery ==
Proper Right/Back

Proper Left

Label

== See also ==
- Cyrillic Projector
- Cryptanalysis
- Kryptos
- List of public art in Washington, D.C., Ward 2
