= Terrestrial Physics =

Terrestrial Physics is a sculpture by American artist Jim Sanborn which includes a full-scale working particle accelerator. It was displayed in the Museum of Contemporary Art as part of Denver's Biennial of the Americas from June–September 2010.

== Sculpture ==
Terrestrial Physics involves a polished aluminum sphere that is attached to a cylindrical glass tube coupled with rings of copper. The sculpture is able to generate a 1 million volt potential difference using a built-in Van de Graaff generator. The work was inspired by what followed from the unexpected report on 26 January 1939 by the physicists Niels Bohr and Enrico Fermi, invited speakers at the Fifth Washington Conference on Theoretical Physics, of the discovery of nuclear fission in Berlin by Otto Hahn and Fritz Strassmann and its interpretation by Lise Meitner and Otto Frisch.

The Germans had used thermal neutrons to cause fission, but at least two U.S. groups realized they could make confirmatory experiments with accelerator neutron sources, and did so within a few days of hearing the news. The experiment at the Department of Terrestrial Magnetism (DTM) of Carnegie Institution of Washington on the night of Saturday 28 January 1939, using their Van de Graaff generator driven accelerator was probably the second U.S. confirmation of the European discovery of nuclear fission.

Sanborn, with permission and assistance of DTM, has reproduced the historical Van de Graaff generator used in that experiment.

== History ==
Sanborn stated that the idea for the project came to him by accident while he was working on another of his projects, Atomic Time: Pure Science and Seduction. This was an exhibition/sculpture that was inspired by the science and experiments taking place during the Manhattan Project. The exhibition included Sanborn's sculpture Critical Assembly that was housed in one of the actual components from an atomic bomb.

During the period when he was displaying his work at the Corcoran Gallery of Art in 2003, Sanborn discovered an accelerator and was given permission to copy it. He was also able to obtain some fittings from the item. With the help of a NASA engineer, Sanborn was then able to achieve a working particle accelerator which could also cause nuclear fission. When asked why he wanted to create this work of art, he stated "There are moments in history that people should be reminded of."
