= Coastline (sculpture) =

Sculpture by Jim Sanborn

- Artist: Jim Sanborn
- Year: 1993
- Type: Outdoor sculpture
- Dimensions: 1.8 m × 9.1 m × 23 m (6 ft × 30 ft × 75 ft)
- Location: Silver Spring, Maryland; 38°59′29″N 77°01′47″W

Coastline is an outdoor sculpture by American artist Jim Sanborn installed at the National Oceanic and Atmospheric Administration complex in Silver Spring, Maryland.

Coastline attempts to recreate the effect of waves crashing on the Atlantic coast (represented by rough-cut granite). This is achieved with artificial waves generated by a turbine and pneumatic blower underneath the sculpture. Sanborn built a quarter-size scale model of the sculpture and consulted with a wave engineer while doing research for the project.
