= Walter E. Washington Convention Center =

Convention center in Washington, D.C

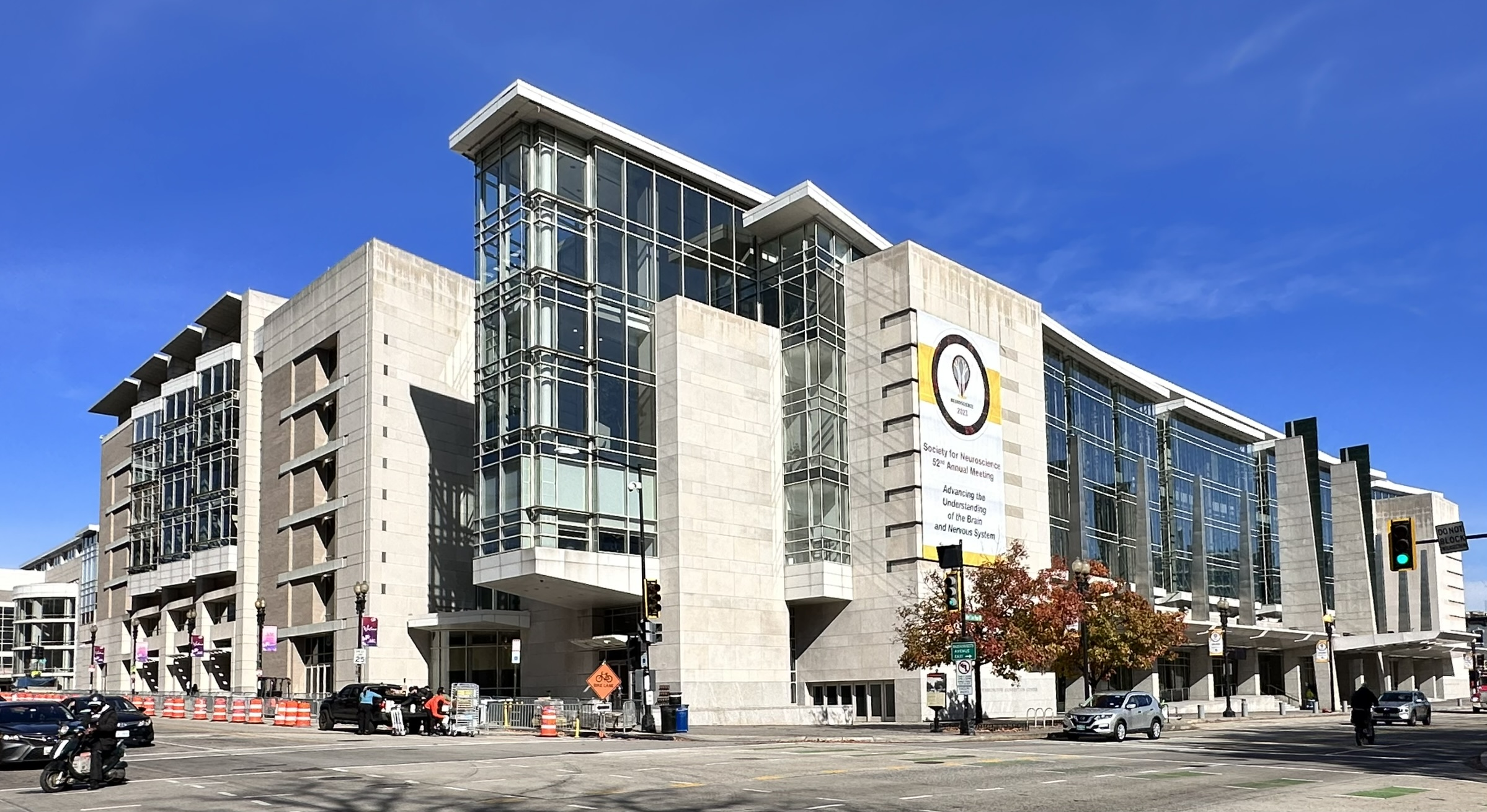
- Walter E. Washington Convention Center in 2023
- Interactive map of Walter E. Washington Convention Center
- Address: 801 Allen Y. Lew Place NW
- Location: Washington, D.C., U.S.
- Coordinates: 38.9051°N 77.023°W
- Public transit: Washington Metro at Mount Vernon Square

Construction
- Opened: 2003

Website
- eventsdc.com/Venues/ConventionCenter.aspx

The Walter E. Washington Convention Center is a 2.3-million-square-foot (210,000 m^{2}) convention center located in Washington, D.C., owned and operated by the city's convention arm, Events DC. Designed in a joint venture by the Atlanta-based architecture firm Tvsdesign, Washington, D.C.–based architects Devrouax & Purnell Architects Planners PC and Mariani and Associates, the convention center is located in a superblock bounded by Mount Vernon Square and 7th, 9th and N streets, N.W. It is served by the Mount Vernon Square station on the Yellow and Green lines of the Washington Metro. It was completed in 2003.

The center is noted for its extensive permanent collection of contemporary art, the largest of any convention center in the United States and one of the largest public art collections in Washington, D.C., outside of a museum, including works by Sam Gilliam, Sol LeWitt, Jaune Quick-to-See Smith, Sarah Sze, and Carrie Mae Weems.

== Major events ==
Six of the nine official inaugural balls for the 2005 second inauguration of George W. Bush were held at the convention center.

In 2006, the Council of the District of Columbia approved legislation naming the then-Washington Convention Center in honor of the city's first home rule mayor, the late Walter E. Washington. In 2008, the WCSA Board of Directors agreed to expand the newly built convention center by 75,000 square feet (7,000 m^{2}).

Six of the 10 official balls of the 2009 Presidential Inauguration of Barack Obama took place there, including the first-ever Neighborhood Ball.

The center was the principal site of the 2010 Nuclear Security Summit hosted by President Barack Obama.

On November 10, 2011, ground was broken on the 14-story Washington Marriott Marquis, a $520 million, four-star, 1,175-room "convention center headquarters hotel" with more than 100,000 square feet (9,300 m^{2}) of meeting room space. Also in 2011, the convention center hosted a major fight card with a welterweight championship match between Lamont Peterson and Amir Khan at the Walter E. Washington Convention Center.

In 2013, it was announced that the Walter E. Washington Convention Center would be the 5-year host of Otakon, the Japanese and East Asian culture convention that was held since 1999 in the Baltimore Convention Center in Baltimore, Maryland, starting with Otakon 2017 and going at least until Otakon 2021. It was considered to be a "great win" for Washington, D.C.'s convention business with an estimated $25 million annual revenue for D.C. and over 30,000 visitors expected during the time Otakon is in D.C. Otakon announced in 2016 that they would remain at the Walter E. Washington Convention Center through Otakon 2024.

The pop culture convention Awesome Con debuted at the center in 2013. After a successful debut (and some growing pains), the annual event has grown to become one of the largest fan conventions on the East Coast of the United States. The 2013 event drew about 7,000 attendees. The 2017 event hosted 70,000 attendees. Celebrity guests have included David Tennant, John Boyega, Stan Lee, Alex Kingston, William Shatner, George Takei and many others.

Since 2014 the National Book Festival has been held at the center.

The Frederick Classic on the Hill women's gymnastics tournament is held at the convention center.

In December 2022, President Biden hosted delegations from 49 African nations at the Convention Center for the United States–Africa Leaders Summit 2022.

From July 9 to 11, 2024, the center hosted the 2024 Washington summit of the North Atlantic Treaty Organization.

Following the NATO summit, U.S. President Joe Biden hosted a solo press conference to assure Democratic politicians, voters, and European allies that he had the energy and leadership to beat Donald Trump in the 2024 presidential election.

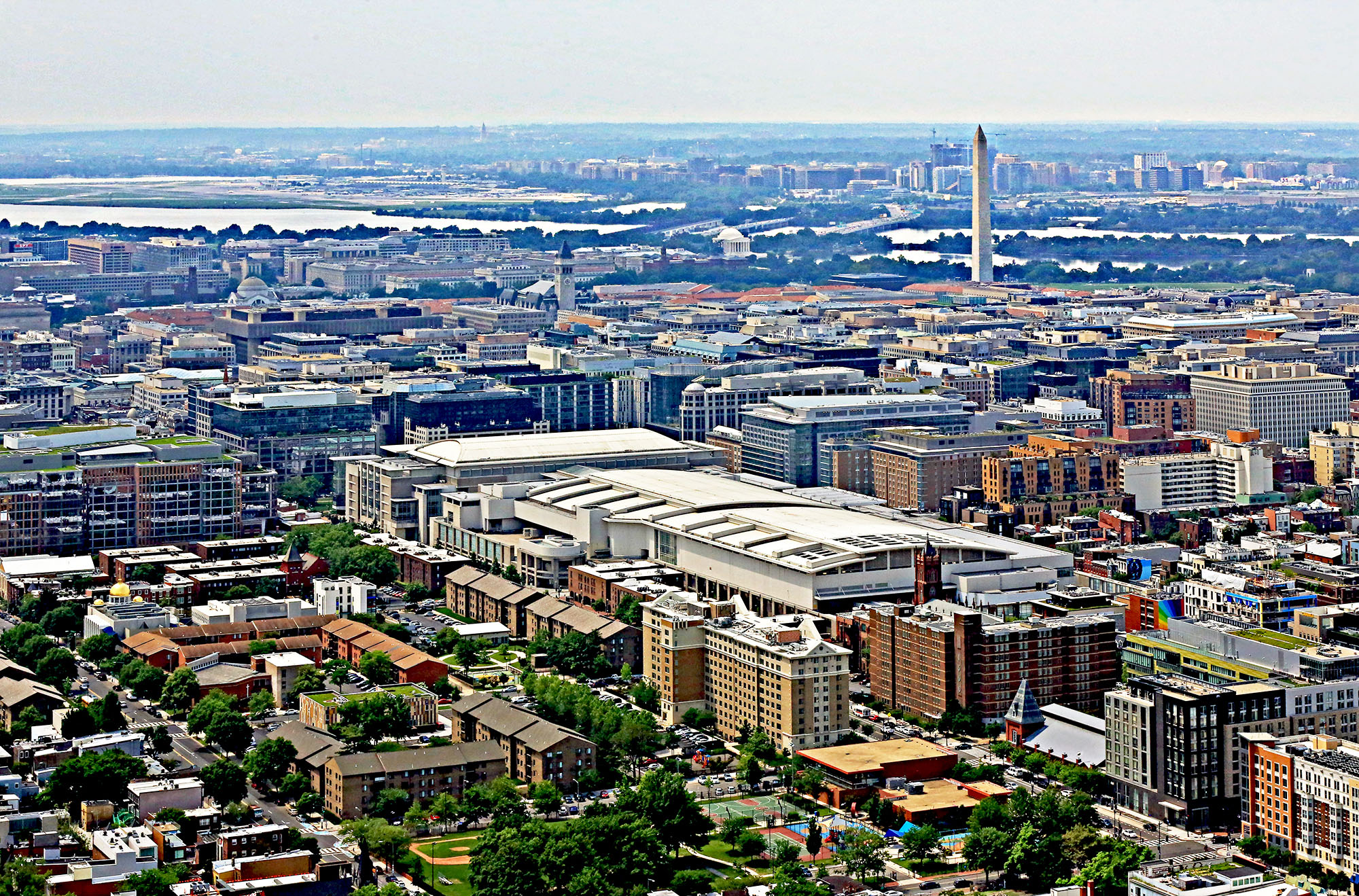
Walter E Washington Convention Center

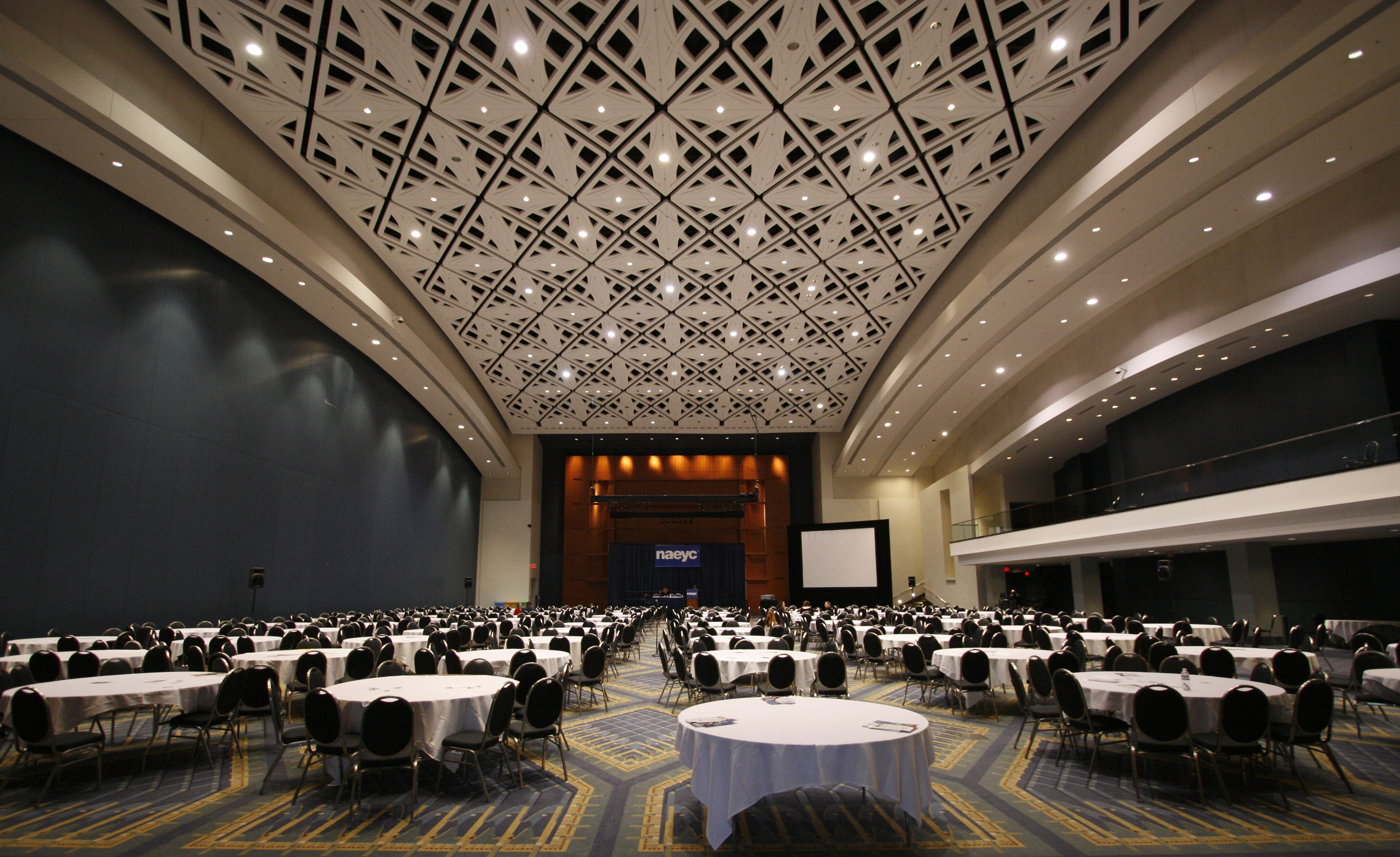
Walter E. Washington Convention Center - Ballroom C

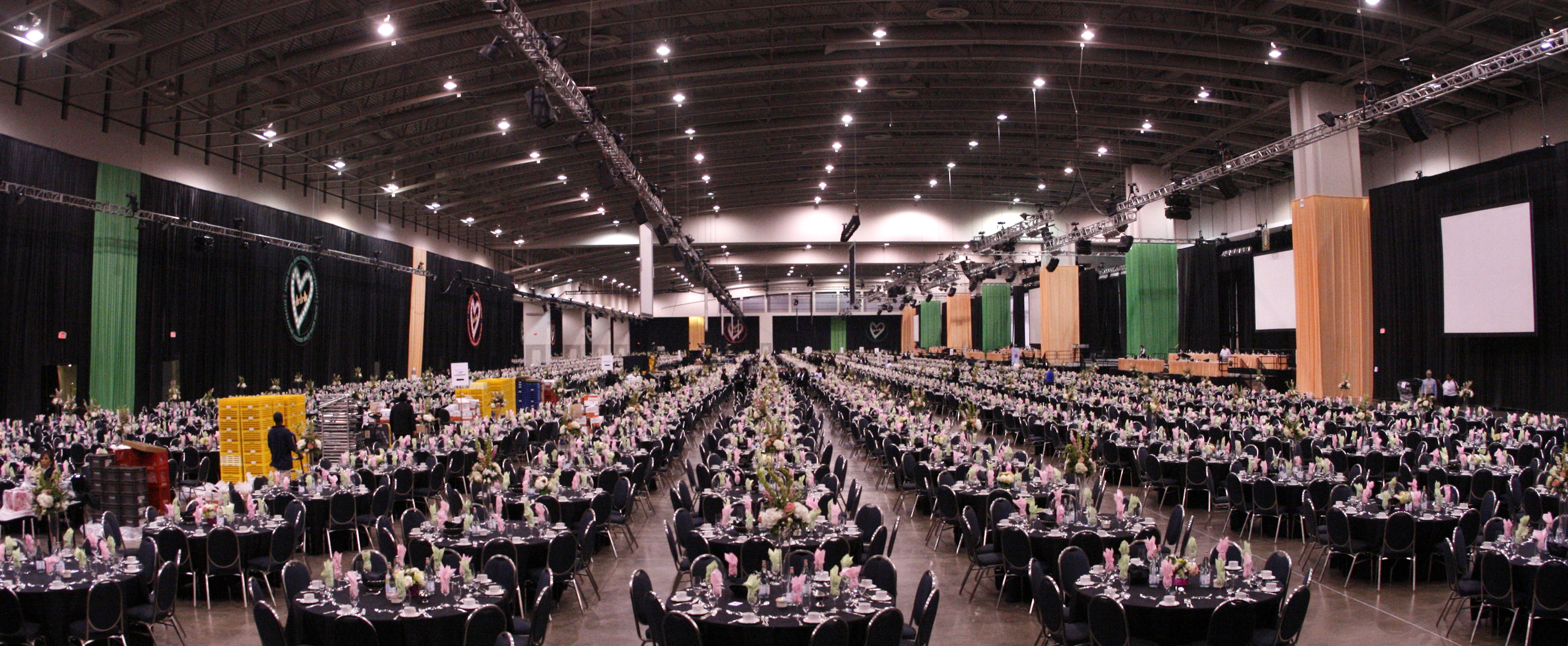
Worlds Largest Sit Down Dinner at Walter E. Washington Convention Center on July 17, 2008

== The old Washington Convention Center ==
The previous Washington Convention Center was located one block southwest at 909 H Street NW, occupying the city block bounded by New York Avenue, 9th Street, H Street and 11th Street. Construction on the center began in 1980, and it opened on December 10, 1982. At 800,000 square feet (74,000 m^{2}), it was the fourth largest facility in the United States at the time. However, during the 1980s and 1990s, numerous larger and more modern facilities were constructed around the country, and by 1997 the Washington Convention Center was only the 30th largest facility.

After being replaced by the new Walter E. Washington Convention Center, the old convention center was imploded at approximately 7:30 a.m. on December 18, 2004.

== See also ==
- Lingua (sculpture)
- List of convention centers in the United States
