= Robert Livingstone (disambiguation) =

Robert Livingstone is a businessman.

Robert Livingstone may also refer to:

- Bob Livingstone (1922–2013), American football player
- Bobby Livingstone, Scottish footballer and manager

== See also ==
- Robert Livingston (disambiguation)
