= Allen Y. Lew =

American city planner (1950–2020)

Allen Yee Lew (September 11, 1950 – June 23, 2020) was a city planning executive that worked in Washington, D.C. and New York City, overseeing the development and renovation of stadiums, convention centers and other public works. He died in 2020 from Coronavirus.

In Washington D.C. he oversaw public works projects under three mayors. He was also the first Asian-American vice chancellor of the City University of New York, where he was an alumni.

== Early life ==
Allen Yee Lew was born on Sept. 11, 1950, in Manhattan to an immigrant father, Fong Young Lew, from Guangzhou, China and a Chinese-American mother, who had been born Helen Yee. His parents owned a dry-cleaning business. He grew up in Hell's Kitchen, Manhattan and Long Island City, Queens. He graduated from Brooklyn Technical High School.

== Career ==
Winning an art contest in elementary school inspired Lew to study design and he went on to earn his Bachelor of Science degree in architecture from the City College of New York. He then received a master's degree in architecture and urban design from Columbia University.

In New York City, Lew served as executive vice president and chief operating officer of the Jacob K. Javits Convention Center from 1983 to 1988. He also served a vice president the real estate developer Rose Associates and as the vice president for capital programs of the New York City Health and Hospitals Corporation.

In 1996, Lew then went to Washington D.C. to lead development of an $850 million city convention center at Mount Vernon Square as acting general manager and chief executive of the Washington Convention Center Authority. It was then the largest public works project in the city's history. After his death, Mount Vernon Place was official renamed Allen Y. Lew Place in 2023 in his honor.

After the convention center was built, Lew then went to serve as chief executive of the D.C. Sports and Entertainment Commission, where he oversaw the renovation of RFK Stadium, which had fallen into disuse after the Washington Redskins departed the city for suburban Maryland in 1997. The stadium was to serve as a temporary home for the city's new Major League Baseball franchise.

== Personal life ==
Lew married Suling Goon, an equity sales manager and research director at an investment bank, in 1979.
