= Robert L. Livingston (died 1979) =

American publisher, political aide, and civil rights administrator

Robert L. Livingston (died on May 27, 1979) was an American publisher, political aide, and civil rights administrator. He was best known as the publisher of More, a 1970s journalism review. He also served as an aide to U.S. Senator Daniel Patrick Moynihan and as a commissioner on the New York City Commission on Human Rights. Following his death, his mother, Mollie Parnis, established the Livingston Awards in his memory.

== Early life and education ==
He was born to Mollie Parnis, a designer, and Leon Livingston, a fashion executive. He earned his bachelor's degree from Yale University in 1954 and his master's degree from Oxford University in 1956. He produced various plays and in 1971, he produced Off Broadway, Conrad Bromberg's "Transfers," with Herman Shumlin. He took over as publisher of More magazine in 1975, when it was facing financial problems.

== Career ==
Livingston worked as the publisher of More, a monthly journalism review based in New York City during the 1970s. He left the magazine after Michael Kramer took over as publisher. He was a member of the finance committee of the National Gay Task Force, and in 1977 he was appointed by Abraham Beame to serve as a commissioner on the New York City Commission on Human Rights. His appointment was on three years term.

In March 1979, he was honored ceremonially as "outstanding leadership in the cause of human rights for all citizens, preeminently his courageous and persuasive advocacy of full civil rights for lesbians and gay men" by Ed Koch and Andrew Stein. Other than that, he was also the founder of the New York Political Action Council and the chairperson of the NGTF Fund for Human Dignity Livingston, which was part of the National Gay Task Force.

== Death ==
He died on May 27, 1979, at his home at 180 East 79th Street due to cancer that he had had since last summer.

== Legacy ==
Parnis established the Livingston Award to commemorate him in 1981.
