= Caloosahatchee Manuscripts =

Sculpture designed by Jim Sanborn

Caloosahatchee Manuscripts is the title of a sculpture designed by American artist Jim Sanborn. It is currently located at the Old Post Office Building in Fort Myers, Florida.

== Medium ==
The sculpture is bronze with text cut from a water jet cutter, and a pinpoint light source.
