= Awesome Con =

Annual pop culture convention in Washington DC

- Status: Active
- Genre: Multi-genre
- Venue: Walter E. Washington Convention Center
- Location: Washington, D.C.
- Country: United States
- Inaugurated: April 20, 2013; 13 years ago (as Awesome Con D.C.)
- Attendance: Approximately 60,000 in 2024
- Organizer: LeftField Media
- Filing status: For Profit
- Website: awesome-con.com

Awesome Con is an annual pop culture convention in Washington, D.C. The event takes place in the Walter E. Washington Convention Center.

Awesome Con debuted in 2013 and became one of the largest fan conventions on the East Coast of the United States. The 2013 event drew about 7,000 attendees. The 2024 event hosted 60,000 attendees. Celebrity guests have included David Tennant, John Boyega, Hayden Christensen, Stan Lee, Rosario Dawson, William Shatner, George Takei, and many others.

== History ==
Civil rights activist and Congressman John Lewis attended Awesome Con in 2014. He spoke at a panel about his autobiographical graphic novel "March", which covers his childhood and civil rights activity.

The 2020 convention was canceled due to the COVID-19 pandemic. The event was originally scheduled for Spring 2020 and was rescheduled for December 2020, but was eventually called off completely. Awesome Con returned in August of 2021 with guests Michael J. Fox, Christopher Lloyd, Billy Boyd, Christina Ricci, George Takei, Adam Savage, William Shatner, and more.
