= Edward Scheidt =

American cryptographer (born 1939)

- Born: Edward Michael Scheidt; July 20, 1939; San Bernardino County, California, U.S.
- Education: Tulane University; University of Maryland; George Washington University
- Occupation: Communications security
- Known for: Kryptos
- Spouse: Mary Jane Shope
- Parent(s): Edward Henry Scheidt (1892-1976), Ruth Christine Adema (1911-2001)
- Espionage activity
- Country: United States
- Service branch: Central Intelligence Agency
- Service years: 1963-1989

Edward Michael Scheidt is a retired Chairman of the Central Intelligence Agency (CIA) Cryptographic Center and the designer of the cryptographic systems used in the Kryptos sculpture at CIA Headquarters in Langley, Virginia.

== Early life ==
Scheidt was born July 20, 1939, in San Bernardino County. He graduated in 1957 from Cor Jesu High School in New Orleans and then joined the Army, where he worked in Signals Intelligence.

== CIA ==
In 1963, he was hired as a communications officer for the CIA, in the Office of Communications, which began a 26-year career, after which he retired in December 1989. Scheidt spent 12 years posted overseas, including serving in Vientiane from 1963, Damascus and Tel Aviv from 1966 to 1968, Manila from 1971 to 1973, and Athens from 1978 to 1980.

In 1965, Scheidt was promoted from Foreign Service Staff Class 8 to Class 7.

Most often he used one-time pad paper systems of encryption.

Scheidt received a B.A. in business administration from the University of Maryland in 1970 and an M.S. in telecommunications from George Washington University in 1975. In 1974 he was with the Army Communications Service Group and by 1978 he had reached Foreign Service Reserve Level 6 (Step 4 in November 1978 and Step 5 in February 1980).

Scheidt is best known for his involvement with Kryptos, a sculpture in the CIA courtyard which contains one of the world's most famous unsolved codes. Kryptos was created by Washington, D.C., sculptor Jim Sanborn, who was commissioned by the CIA in the 1980s to create art around their new Headquarters building in 1988. After Sanborn decided he wanted to incorporate some encrypted messages in his artwork, he was teamed with Scheidt, who was in the process of retiring and was called by then-director William H. Webster "The Wizard of Codes". Up until that point, Sanborn had never used encryption or text in his work. Scheidt taught various encryption methods to Sanborn, who chose the exact messages to be encrypted. Of the messages on the sculpture, three have been solved, but the fourth section, 97 or 98 characters at the very bottom, remains uncracked."

In 1991, journalist Bill Gertz referred to Scheidt as the "Deep Throat of Codes" while describing his clandestine meetings with Sanborn. This nickname was later said to have been applied to Scheidt by Webster before being added to Scheidt's bio on the TecSec website by 2015.

== TecSec ==
In the early 1990s, Scheidt noted that encryption, which originated for primarily one-to-one communications, now faced new and substantially different key management requirements in large network or virtual network environments. It was into this technologically dynamic environment that Ed co-founded TecSec Inc., a software encryption company in 1990 in Vienna, Virginia. As of March 2023 he was senior security development executive vice president at Tecsec.

One of their first ventures was to manufacture portable satellite versions of the secure STU-III telephones used by the government. Scheidt manufactured the first model in his home basement workshop, and approximately 500 were in use worldwide by the United States Foreign Service as of 2002. The company also set out to create an encryption design with its key management that could be cited in standards or use components of standards.

In forming TecSec and building the company's large IP library, he anticipated the flexibility and mobility required of 21st Century communication systems with a key management system that is primarily client-based and much less dependent upon a central server. The relative scalability achieved by this approach, together with encryption at the object level, provides enforced role based access and granularity not otherwise available. Ed remains deeply involved in the company's product development and expanding application solutions, just as he is in general management. He holds 36 patents in cryptographic technologies through TecSec from 1993 to 2015.

In February 2010 TecSec filed a lawsuit against several large tech vendors claiming infringement of several patents covering encryption technology. The case concluded in 2019 with Adobe paying no damages.

== Other ==
As of September 2020, Scheidt was vice chair, ANSI X9F for global security standards, Accredited Standards Committee X9, which develops and promotes standards for the US financial services industry. Scheidt is also convenor of ISO TC68/SC2/Working group (WG) 17 for the creation of the digital currency security Technical Specification international standard. WG17 includes representation from various countries and commercial interest. As convenor of WG17, Scheidt represents ISO to ITU for their Fiat digital currency efforts.

In honor of the 100th Anniversary of the Knights of Columbus in the Commonwealth of Virginia, Charter Grand Knight Edward M. Scheidt conceived a symbolic representation known as the Virginia Ecumenical Chalice, which was subsequently presented to and blessed by Pope John Paul II in 2001.

As of 2008, Scheidt was a board member of the National Capital Area Council of the Boy Scouts of America.
