= Lingua (sculpture) =

Coordinates: 38°54′13.29″N 77°1′24.35″W

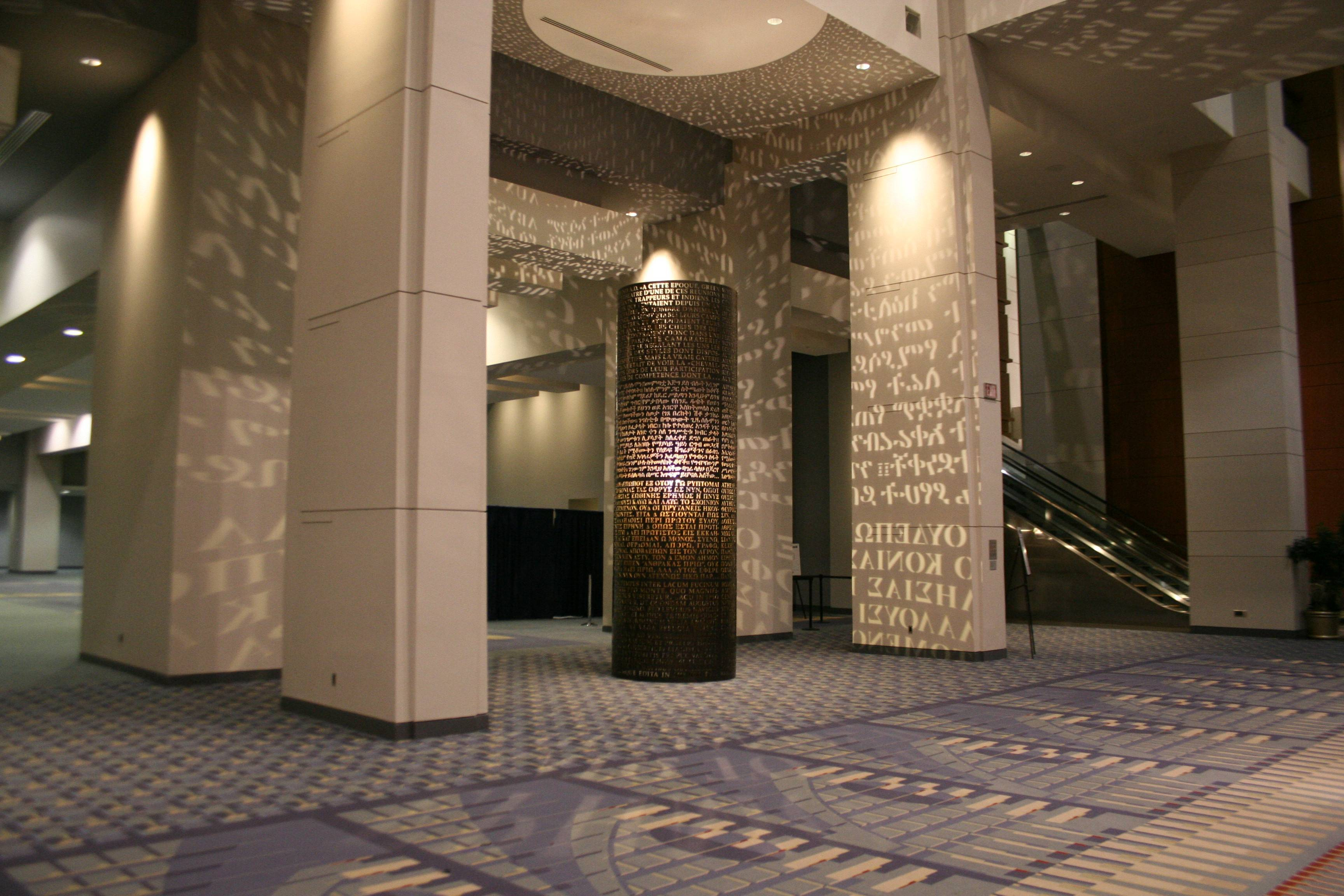
Lingua in Washington DC

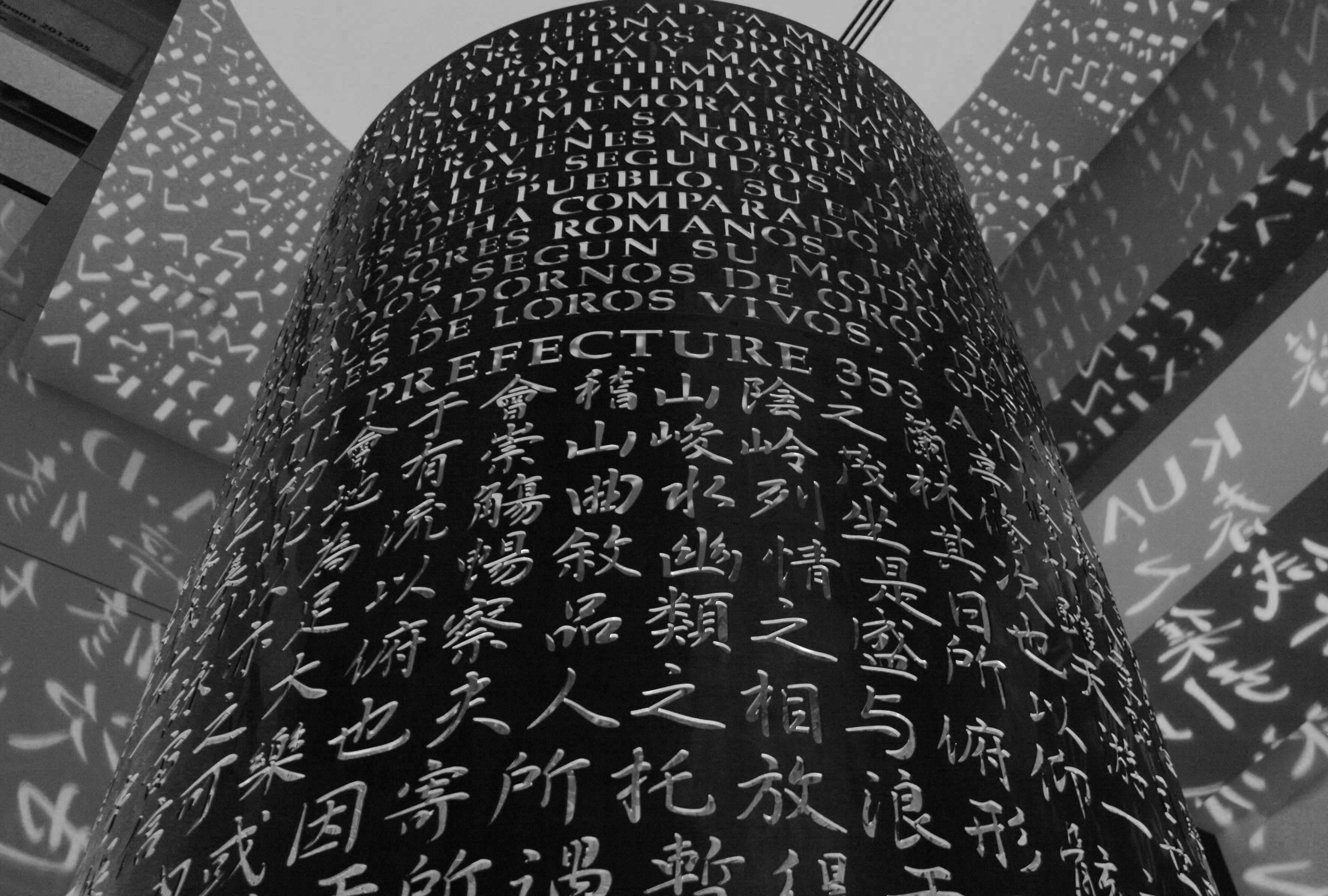
Lingua close-up view

The Lingua is a sculpture by American artist Jim Sanborn located at the Walter E. Washington Convention Center.

== Sculpture ==
Lingua is composed of two 16' tall cylinders, with text cut with a water jet cutter in Russian, Mandarin Chinese, Amharic, French, Spanish, Latin, Greek, and Iroquois. The texts are historical texts from as far back as 1400 BC.

The Russian-language section is a quote from Leo Tolstoy's 1869 novel War and Peace (Volume 3, Part 1, beginning of chapter XXII).

The Chinese-language section is a piece of Chinese calligraphy work Lantingji Xu written by Wang Xizhi.
