= Cyrillic Projector =

Sculpture created by Jim Sanborn

Coordinates: 35.3060°N 80.7295°W

The Cyrillic Projector is a sculpture created by American artist Jim Sanborn in the early 1990s, and purchased by the University of North Carolina at Charlotte in 1997. It is currently installed between the campus's Friday and Fretwell Buildings.

== Related sculptures ==
The encrypted sculpture Cyrillic Projector is part of an encrypted family of three intricate puzzle-sculptures by Sanborn, the other two named Kryptos and Antipodes. The Kryptos sculpture (located at CIA headquarters in Langley, Virginia) has text which is duplicated on Antipodes. Antipodes has two sides — one with the Latin alphabet and one with Cyrillic. The Latin side is similar to Kryptos. The Cyrillic side is similar to the Cyrillic Projector.

== Solution ==
The encrypted text of the Cyrillic Projector was first reportedly solved by Frank Corr in early July 2003, followed by an equivalent decryption by Mike Bales in September of the same year. Both endeavors gave results in the Russian language. The first English translation of the text was led by Elonka Dunin.

The sculpture includes two messages. The first is a Russian text that explains the use of psychological control to develop and maintain potential sources of information. The second is a partial quote about the Soviet dissident, Nobel Peace Prize awarded scientist Sakharov. The text is from a classified KGB memo, detailing concerns that his report at the 1982 Pugwash conference was going to be used by the U.S. for anti-Soviet propaganda purposes.
