= Robert Livingston (Florida politician) =

American politician (1835–1869)

Robert Livingston (1835–1869) was a state legislator in Florida. He was born enslaved in Leon County, Florida and became a carpenter. He represented Leon County in the Florida House of Representatives in 1868.

He was born in Leon County. A resolution honoring him was recorded in the Florida House in January 1869.

== See also ==
- African American officeholders from the end of the Civil War until before 1900
