= Mollie Parnis =

American fashion designer

- Born: Sarah Rosen Parnis; March 18, 1899; New York, New York, U.S.
- Died: July 18, 1992 (aged 93); New York University Hospital, New York, U.S.
- Occupation: Fashion designer
- Known for: Designing clothing for First Ladies
- Spouse: Leon Livingston
- Children: Robert Livingston
- Parents: Abraham Parnis (father); Sarah Rosenstock (mother)

Mollie Parnis (born Sarah Rosen Parnis; March 18, 1899 – July 18, 1992), later Livingston, was an American fashion designer. She belongs to the first generation of American designers to be known to the public by name rather than by affiliation to a department store and is best known for designing clothing worn by many First Ladies, as well as the uniform of the Cadet Nurse Corps in World War II.

She grew up on the Upper West Side of Manhattan and attended the Wadleigh High School and Julia Richman. At the young age of 8, she tutored foreigners in English for under a dollar an hour.

She lived on Park Avenue, and had a weekend home in Katonah, New York.

== Career ==
Parnis was born in New York City to Austrian Jewish parents Abraham Parnis and Sarah Rosenstock. At age 10, she and her younger sister Bessie were temporarily sent to live in an orphanage, likely after her father's death.

Mollie Parnis had relatively informal training as a fashion designer, especially considering the level of commercial success she achieved. During a short stint studying law at Hunter College, Parnis worked in sales for a blouse manufacturer. Because of her keen eye for design and her intuition for amending designs to be more appealing to consumers, she was quickly promoted. In 1933, Parnis and her husband, Leon Livingston, started a company called Parnis Livingston Inc. on Seventh Avenue in the Garment District that sold women's suits and blouses. This business drew from Parnis' design expertise and her husband's experience with fabrics and textiles. In the 1940s she began designing under her name only.

Parnis achieved popularity through her conservative, feminine, flattering designs, which were available in department stores across the United States. In 1966 her business grossed $3 million, demonstrating her commercial success. Her designs were regularly featured in fashion magazines like Vogue, Harpers Bazaar, and Vanity Fair, and several articles in LIFE described her success, proclaiming that "When Mollie Parnis Thinks a Design Will Sell, It Goes." Contributing to the increasing recognition of American fashion designers, Parnis often worked with noted publicist Eleanor Lambert in the Council of Fashion Designers of America and by being included in the International Best-Dressed List in 1967.

=== Patronage of First Ladies ===
Parnis is most remembered for her close relationships and frequent patronage from American First Ladies. Mamie Eisenhower frequently wore dresses and suits by Parnis, including a purple gabardine suit for President Eisenhower's 1957 inauguration and a black and white silk dress when she met Queen Elizabeth at the St. Lawrence Seaway in 1959. She also wore a 'silky purple Molly Parnis dress [with] a Peter Pan collar' to her sixtieth birthday party in 1956. The most publicized event in which Eisenhower wore a Parnis dress was in 1955, when a woman in a receiving line wore the same blue-green shirtwaist dress as the First Lady, an event that could have caused much embarrassment. Parnis is quoted saying, "I do not sell directly to any wearer, nor do I usually make one of a kind; that is what makes this country a great democracy. But I do feel that the First Lady should have something special." Eisenhower and Parnis's dress, Model 448, were featured in a multi-page spread in LIFE titled "Blue-Green on the National Scene." The feature included images of women across the country wearing the dress.

Lady Bird Johnson also frequently wore Parnis' designs because she could wear them in her busy life and "still look like a lady." The two developed a close relationship, and Parnis was often invited to the White House for state dinners and the Johnson's ranch in Texas. Parnis' designs were also included in the 1968 White House Fashion Show, which Lady Bird and her staff organized and is the only fashion show to ever be held in the White House.

Parnis had photographs of the First Ladies wearing her designs with their husbands. She even had a photograph signed by Lyndon B. Johnson, wearing a shirt she had designed for him.

=== Museum collections ===
Museum collections that include Parnis' garments are:

- Texas Fashion Collection, Denton, TX
- Chicago History Museum, Chicago, IL
- LBJ Presidential Library, Austin, TX
- Eisenhower Presidential Library, Abilene, KS
- Metropolitan Museum of Art, Costume Institute, New York City, NY
- Indianapolis Museum of Art, Indianapolis, IN
- Museum of Texas Tech University, Lubbock, TX
