= Critical Assembly =

Critical Assembly is a sculpture by American artist Jim Sanborn which was displayed at the Corcoran Gallery of Art in Washington, D.C. in 2003. It included several elements, some actual and some re-created, which were part of the first project at Los Alamos laboratories to design the first atomic bomb.

== Sculpture ==
Critical Assembly was displayed at the Corcoran Gallery of Art in 2003 during an exhibit entitled "Atomic Time: Pure Science and Seduction." The main part of the sculpture is a three-dimensional representation of components of an atomic bomb. The artwork included a disassembled sphere that had been designed to hold the nuclear payload of plutonium and uranium. Sanborn purchased the blank sphere from prior lab employees who had bought them as surplus after the experiments of the project ceased.

The sculpture was surrounded by black cables which draped underneath eight tables holding different devices used in the research and implementation of the first atomic bomb. The actual cabinet-sized detection equipment used at Los Alamos were also on display. The sounds from Geiger counters could be heard within the room, indicating low levels of radiation coming from four radium wrist watches. On the wall was a blue radium clock dial that was frozen at 5:30 a.m., July 16, 1945, the time of the Trinity blast in Alamogordo, New Mexico. Sanborn himself was born in 1945, in Washington, D.C.

== History ==
For a number of years preceding the unveiling of Critical Assembly, Sanborn made several trips to Los Alamos, New Mexico. This was the site where the Manhattan Project worked on the world's first atomic bomb. With the assistance of retired scientists, hobbyists, and collectors, he obtained actual lab equipment used in the atomic bomb's research. With this equipment he pieced together a "life-size re-creation of a hypothetical atomic lab."

In 2017, the sculpture was permanently installed at the National Museum of Nuclear Science & History in Albuquerque, NM.

== Critical reception ==
Blake Gopnik from The Washington Post wrote that "Sanborn's installation brings us face to face, in the most immediate way imaginable, with what it means to make an atom bomb. That may turn out to be the most pressing issue our species will ever face." The Corcoran Gallery of Art curator Jonathan Binstock called the artwork "a unique brew of historical accuracy and aesthetic license."
