= Robert W. Livingston =

American psychologist and author

- Born: Robert Wayne Livingston; Lexington, Kentucky, U.S.
- Occupations: Academic, author

Academic background
- Education: Tulane University (BA); University of California, Los Angeles (MA); Ohio State University (MA, PhD)

Academic work
- Discipline: Social psychology
- Institutions: Harvard Kennedy School; University of Sussex; Northwestern University; University of Wisconsin–Madison

Robert Wayne Livingston is an American social psychologist, author, and academic. He is a lecturer in public policy at the Harvard Kennedy School and a faculty affiliate of its Center for Public Leadership. He previously served as a professor of organisational behaviour at the University of Sussex, where he founded and directed the Centre for Leadership, Ethics, and Diversity.

== Early life and education ==
Livingston was born in Lexington, Kentucky, and grew up in St. Martin's Village, a historically Black neighborhood in the western part of the city. In his 2025 book Play the Game. Change the Game. Leave the Game, he described the neighborhood as "a cocoon that allowed me to develop my wings while ensconced in the warm embrace of a protective and loving Black community".

He received a Bachelor of Arts degree cum laude from Tulane University in 1993, majoring in Spanish and minoring in Latin American studies. He subsequently completed a Master of Arts degree in Romance literature and linguistics at the University of California, Los Angeles in 1996.

Livingston later studied social psychology at Ohio State University, where he was supported by a National Science Foundation fellowship. He received a Master of Arts degree in social psychology in 1998 and a PhD in social psychology in 2001. His doctoral adviser was social psychologist Marilynn Brewer.

== Academic career ==
Livingston began his academic career as an assistant professor of psychology and Afro-American studies at the University of Wisconsin–Madison. He later joined the Kellogg School of Management at Northwestern University, where he served as an associate professor of organizational behavior.

He subsequently joined the University of Sussex in Brighton, England, where he was a professor and head of the Department of Organisational Behaviour. He also founded and directed the university's Centre for Leadership, Ethics, and Diversity.

Livingston later joined the Harvard Kennedy School as a lecturer in public policy. He is also affiliated with the school's Center for Public Leadership.

== Research ==
Livingston's research examines social perception, race, gender, leadership, and inequality in organizations. His earlier work considered the influence of physical appearance on social judgments, including how facial features and racial cues affect perceptions of individuals.

In research published in 2009 with Nicholas Pearce, Livingston examined the relationship between facial appearance and career outcomes among Black and White chief executive officers of Fortune 500 companies. The study found that baby-faced appearance was associated with higher levels of career success among Black chief executives but lower levels of success among White chief executives. Livingston and Pearce described this pattern as the "Teddy Bear Effect."

Livingston has also studied the intersection of race and gender in leadership evaluations. In work with Ashleigh Shelby Rosette and Ella Washington, he examined how dominant behavior by Black women leaders was perceived in comparison with similar behavior by Black men and White women.

In related research, Rosette and Livingston examined how workplace failure affected evaluations of leaders with multiple subordinate identities. Their work found that Black women leaders faced particularly negative evaluations following perceived failures.

Livingston and Rosette later distinguished stigmatization, subordination, and marginalization as three different forms of social disadvantage. Their work discussed how these processes may uniquely shape the experiences of different groups defined by race, gender, religion, and other social identities.

Livingston developed the PRESS model as a framework for addressing racial inequity and other organizational or social problems. The model consists of five stages: problem awareness, root-cause analysis, empathy, strategy, and sacrifice. The model was presented in a 2020 article in the Harvard Business Review, "How to Promote Racial Equity in the Workplace." The article received the Warren Bennis Prize, which is jointly administered by the Harvard Business Review and the USC Marshall School of Business.

== Books ==
Livingston's first book, The Conversation: How Seeking and Speaking the Truth about Racism Can Radically Transform Individuals and Organizations, was published in 2021. The book applies the PRESS model to discussions of racism and organizational change. Kirkus Reviews gave it a starred review and described it as "a cogent, hopeful contribution to an urgent issue". It was a finalist for the Financial Times and McKinsey Business Book of the Year Award and was nominated for a NAACP Image Award for Outstanding Literary Work – Instructional.

His second book, Play the Game. Change the Game. Leave the Game: Pathways to Black Empowerment, Prosperity, and Joy, was published in 2025. The book discusses Black empowerment, prosperity, and well-being, drawing in part on interviews with Black public figures, scholars, business leaders, and activists. It debuted at number 10 on the USA Today bestseller list on September 17, 2025, and was longlisted for the 2026 Porchlight Business Book Awards in the personal development and human behavior category.

== Honors and awards ==
- Dissertation Award, Society for the Psychological Study of Social Issues, Division 9, American Psychological Association
- Warren Bennis Prize for Best Article on Leadership, Harvard Business Review (2020)
- The Conversation named a Best Book of 2021 by the Financial Times
- The Conversation finalist, Financial Times Business Book of the Year Award (2021)
- Play the Game. Change the Game. Leave the Game. ranked #10 on the USA Today Bestsellers list
- Honorary Doctorate, Cambridge College (2021)
- The Conversation nominated for a 2022 NAACP Image Award for Outstanding Literary Achievement (Instructional)
- Elected Fellow, Society for Personality and Social Psychology (2022)
- Thinkers50 Radar Class of 2022
