= Jim Sanborn =

American sculptor (born 1945)

- Born: Herbert James Sanborn, Jr. November 14, 1945 (age 80); Washington, D.C., United States
- Known for: Sculpture
- Notable work: Kryptos, Critical Assembly
- Partner: Jae Ko
- Website: www.jimsanborn.net

Herbert James Sanborn, Jr. (born November 14, 1945) is an American sculptor. He is best known for creating the encrypted Kryptos sculpture at CIA headquarters in Langley, Virginia.

== Biography ==
Sanborn was born in Washington, D.C.. His father was the head of exhibitions at the Library of Congress, and his mother was a concert pianist and photo researcher. He grew up in Alexandria and Arlington, Virginia, attending Burgundy Farm Country Day School, followed by JEB Stuart High School—both in Fairfax County—and then attended Randolph-Macon College, receiving a degree in paleontology, fine arts, and social anthropology in 1968, followed by a Master of Fine Arts degree in sculpture from the Pratt Institute in 1971. He taught at Montgomery College in Rockville, Maryland, and then for nine years was the artist-in-residence at Glen Echo Park.

== Art ==
Sanborn's artwork has been displayed at the High Museum of Art, the Los Angeles County Museum of Art, the Corcoran Gallery of Art, and the Hirshhorn Museum and Sculpture Garden. He has created sculptural works for the Massachusetts Institute of Technology, the Central Intelligence Agency, and the National Oceanic and Atmospheric Administration. Themes in his work have included "making the invisible visible", with many sculptures focusing on topics such as magnetism, the coriolis effect, secret messages, and mysteries of atomic reactions.

=== Sculptures ===
While in England studying archaeology, Sanborn endeavored to create a structure out of stone to gain a better insight on Romanesque sculptures. From this he has created many works of art that deal with invisible forces. These include the coriolis effect and its use of Newton's laws of motion that govern the motion of an object in an inertial frame of reference. He has also worked on pieces that implemented the Earth's magnetic field using lodestones. Other sculptures have featured the science of cryptography. One of Sanborn's most famous cryptographic works, entitled Kryptos, is featured in Dan Brown's 2009 novel The Lost Symbol. The novel is one of books which includes Robert Langdon, the symbologist.

==== Kryptos ====
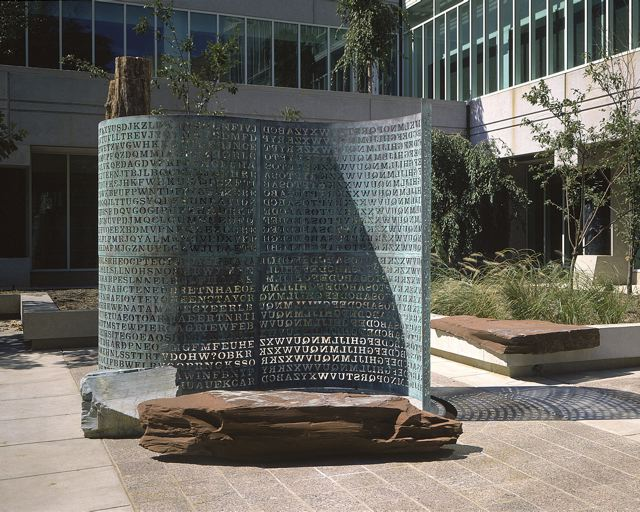
Kryptos at CIA headquarters in Langley, Virginia

Kryptos was the first cryptographic sculpture made by Sanborn. It was presented to the Central Intelligence Agency in Langley, Virginia on November 3, 1990.

The sculpture has been both a puzzle and a mystery for those who hope to crack the cyphered messages contained within the sculpture's 2,000 alphabetic letters. Since Kryptos was erected, three of the four sections have been confirmed to have been solved. No one has yet been able to solve the remaining 97-character message. He has also said that should he die before the sculpture's code is cracked, there will be a "sort of historic record" left to verify the claim.

==== Ex Nexum ====
As part of its 1994–1997 renovations, Sanborn was commissioned to create a sculpture. The sculpture is entitled Ex Nexum; it was installed in 1997 at Little Rock Old US Post Office & Courthouse.

==== Lux ====
Lux was built in 2001 at the Old Post Office Building in Fort Myers, Florida. Both cylinders are made of bronze and they stand as high as 8' with a diameter of 5'. Another work, Caloosahatchee Manuscripts, is in the same location.

=== Exhibits ===
Sanborn has also created works of art that reach into the realms of atomic energy and experimental physics. In Atomic Time: Pure Science and Seduction, he presented a "life-size re-creation of a hypothetical atomic lab." The exhibit featured the sculpture Critical Assembly, a three-dimensional representation of the components of an atomic bomb. The sculpture included a disassembled sphere that had been designed to hold the nuclear payload of plutonium and uranium.

His next exhibit Terrestrial Physics, was to displayed in June 2010 as part of Denver, Colorado's Biennial of the Americas. It included a sculpture that is able to generate a 1 million volt potential difference. Utilizing a recreated Van de Graaff generator, Sanborn created a fully functional particle accelerator capable of creating nuclear fission.

=== Large-scale outdoor projects ===
In addition to designing intricate sculptures and exhibits, Sanborn has also turned some of his large-scale outdoor art into an interactive experience. Coastline located at the National Oceanic and Atmospheric Administration Headquarters in Silver Spring, Maryland, is one such piece. A recreation of a portion of Atlantic coastline, the waves experienced here are transferred in "real time" from a monitoring station at Woods Hole, Massachusetts.

Sanborn designed Indian run park located adjacent to the U.S. Federal Courthouse in Beltsville, Maryland, with inspiration from the Iroquois Nations that inhabited the area nearly 900 years ago. On this site, hundreds of artifacts by the Iroquois have been discovered, and it is estimated that thousands still remain. The artist himself has also "seeded" 10,000 arrowheads within the grounds, allowing visitors the opportunity of taking a piece of this work of art with them. The park, named after the original Indian Run river that once existed there, includes a waterfall and walkway resembling the snaking waterway. Also, located within the park is a bronze cylindrical sculpture written in Onondaga language and "transcribed from the ancient oral tradition of the five Iroquois nations." At night it is illuminated with a pinpoint light that emits its text upon the surrounding environment.

== Literature ==
Sanborn's 2004 book, Atomic Time: Pure Science and Seduction, includes images detailing his exhibit Atomic Time: Pure Science and Seduction inspired by the Manhattan Project.

== Selected works ==
- Kryptos, CIA, 1990. Embedded with four ciphers, it was intended to be a challenge to the employees of the CIA. Presently only three of the four messages have been deciphered.
- Coastline, 1993, an outdoor wave pool sculpture at the National Oceanic and Atmospheric Administration complex in Silver Spring, Maryland.
- Cyrillic Projector, a sculpture installed at the University of North Carolina at Charlotte in 1997.
- A,A, erected in 2004 on the campus of the University of Houston, adjacent to the M.D. Anderson Library.

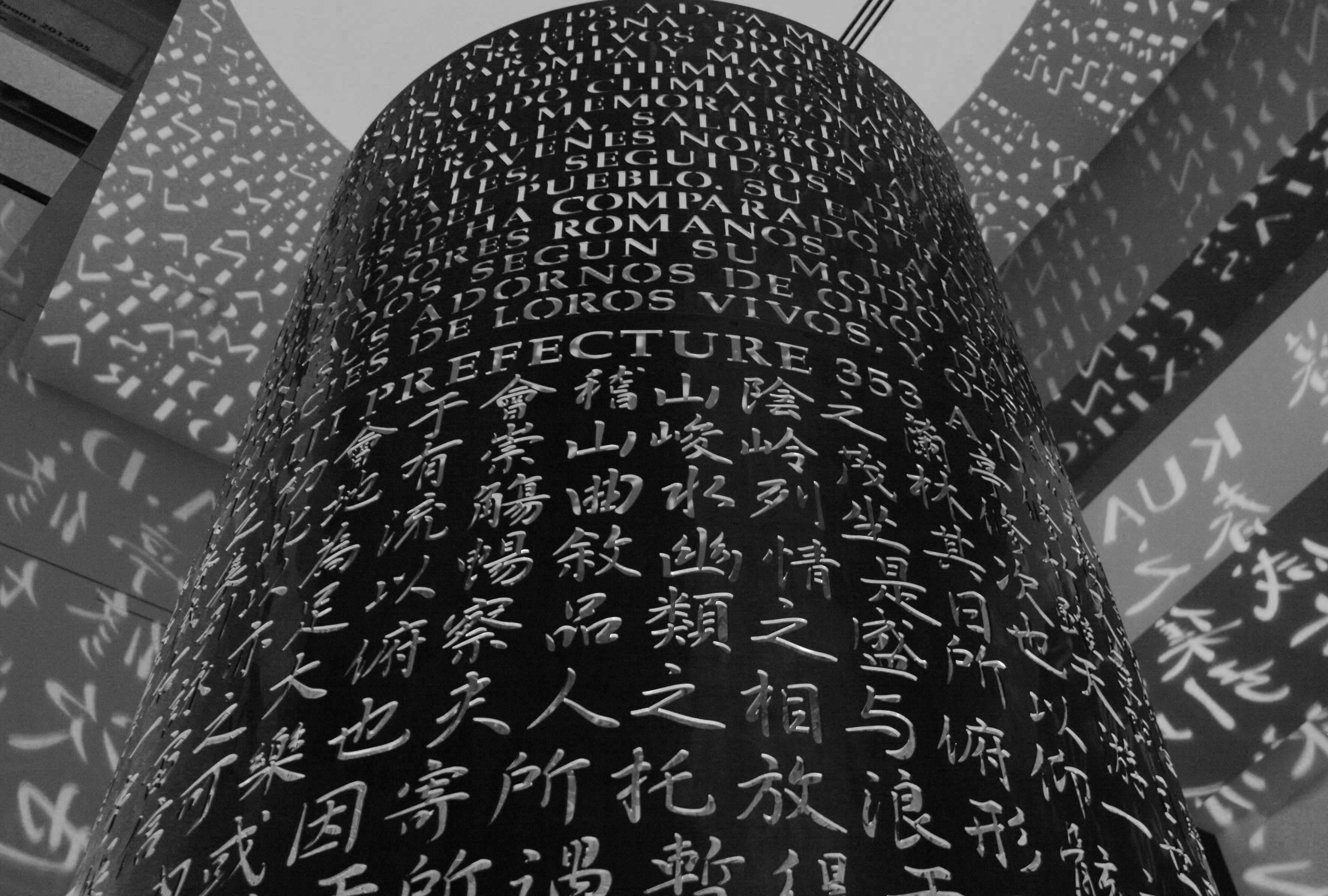
Lingua in Washington DC.

- Lingua located at the Walter E. Washington Convention Center. It contains historical text ranging from 1400 BC to the present day.
- Critical Assembly, 2003, modeled the first atomic bomb and key experiments of the Manhattan Project and was displayed at the Corcoran Gallery of Art.
- Radiance, 2008, Louisiana State University, erected in front of the Center for Energy Studies.
- Terrestrial Physics, 2009, which includes a full-scale working particle accelerator. It premiered in June 2010 as part of Biennial of the Americas.

== Awards and grants ==
- 1982 National Endowment For The Arts Fellowship
- 1983 Kawasaki International Sculpture Symposium, Kawasaki Japan.
- 1984 Virginia Commission On The Arts Fellowship.
- 1986 National Endowment For The Arts Fellowship.
- 1987 Kaoshiung Taiwan International Sculpture Symposium, Kaoshiung Taiwan.
- 1988 Awards In The Visual Arts Grant.
- 1988 Louis Comfort Tiffany Foundation Grant.
- 1990 Art Matters Inc. Grant.
- 1991 Virginia Museum Fellowship.
- 1992 Virginia Commission On the Arts Grant.
- 1992 Pollock-Krasner Foundation Grant.
- 1994 Virginia Commission on The Arts Grant.
- 1997 Sirius Project Residency, Cork Ireland.
