= Old Post Office Building and Customhouse (Little Rock, Arkansas) =

- U.S. National Register of Historic Places
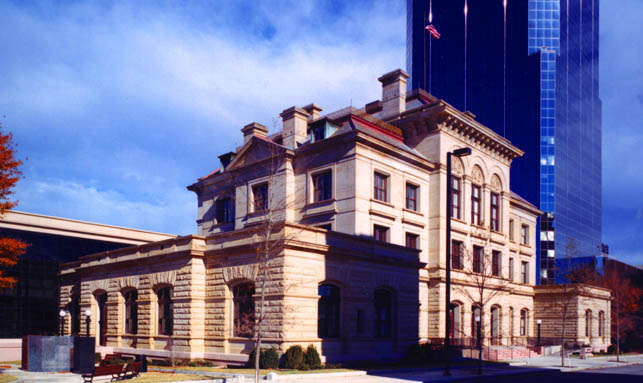
- Old Post Office and Courthouse, June 2003

- Location within Arkansas Location within the United States
- Map showing the location of Old Post Office and Courthouse, Little Rock
- Location: 2nd and Spring Sts., Little Rock, Arkansas
- Coordinates: 34°44′52″N 92°16′24″W
- Built: 1881
- Architectural style: Late 19th And 20th Century Revivals
- NRHP reference No.: 73000388
- Added to NRHP: May 7, 1973

The Little Rock U.S. Post Office and Courthouse, also known as Old Post Office and Courthouse, in Little Rock, Arkansas, is a historic post office, federal office, and courthouse building located at Little Rock in Pulaski County, Arkansas. It is a courthouse for the United States District Court for the Eastern District of Arkansas.

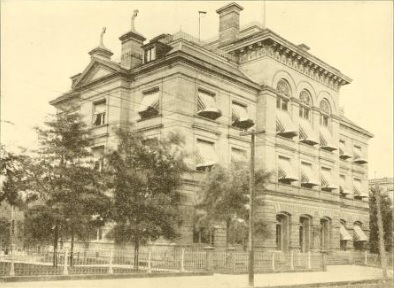
U. S. Courthouse and Post Office, Little Rock, Arkansas

== Building history ==
The Old Post Office and Courthouse was constructed between 1876 and 1881 to accommodate Little Rock's need for various federal services. James B. Hill, supervising architect of the U.S. Treasury Department, designed the building in the Italian Renaissance Revival style. The original architectural plans remain in existence, and may be among the oldest surviving plans in Arkansas.

Originally, the first floor contained postal services, while the second floor consisted of office space for federal agencies including the Collector of Internal Revenue. The U.S. District Court occupied the third and fourth floors with spaces for courtrooms, judges, and juries, as well as the U.S. Marshal's office. As Little Rock continued to grow and the need for federal services increased, the building was enlarged several times. Supervising Architect William Martin Aiken designed a 9,000-square-foot (840 m^{2}) addition that was built to the north of the original building in 1897. It housed a larger mail-sorting space and courtroom. In 1908, Supervising Architect James Knox Taylor designed two additional wings, which wrapped around the east and west sides of the building and totaled 16,000 square feet (1,500 m^{2}), to accommodate postal service needs.

Despite the enlargements, both the postal service and the court vacated the building in 1932 for other facilities in Little Rock; however, federal agencies such as the Armed Forces Examining and Entrance Station continued to occupy it. In 1975, the building was declared surplus federal property, transferred to the Arkansas Commemorative Commission, and renovated for use by the University of Arkansas at Little Rock's William H. Bowen School of Law. In 1992, the law school vacated the property, and the State of Arkansas returned it to the federal government. The U.S. General Services Administration (GSA) oversaw a renovation of the building from 1994 to 1997, and rear wings were added. The U.S. Bankruptcy Court and U.S. Marshal Service currently occupy the building.

The building is one of the most notable examples of the Italian Renaissance Revival style in Arkansas. It was listed in the National Register of Historic Places in 1973 and was nominated for the 2004–2005 The Office Building of the Year (TOBY) Award in the historical building category by the Building Owners and Managers Association.

== Architecture ==
The Little Rock Post Office and Courthouse is an example of Italian Renaissance Revival architecture, a decorative style of the Victorian era. Although the building has several additions, they are compatible with the original portion and the building remains an excellent example of the style. The original four-story building sits atop a Cabin Creek, Arkansas, sandstone foundation. The base is clad in pink Indiana granite and walls are clad in Berea, Ohio, sandstone on the upper stories. Stone on the first level is rusticated, while the stories above are clad in smooth ashlar, an exterior treatment that is common in classically inspired architecture. When GSA completed the 1994–1997 restoration, broken protruding stones and eroded cornices were carefully patched or replaced using stone from the same quarry as the original. Similarly, Virginia slate covering the roof was meticulously repaired or replaced.

A four-story central pavilion dominates the principal facade. It contains windows in tall, round arches on the upper stories. The arches have carved classical motifs, such as crests, urns, and foliated designs, and are separated by simple pilasters (attached columns). The wide overhanging eaves are supported by ornamental brackets, a characteristic of Italian Renaissance Revival architecture. Iron cresting surrounds the roof, which also contains elaborately capped tall chimneys. The pavilion is flanked by three-story wings that contain windows with segmental-arch openings on the first level. Pediments, another classical feature, are located on the side elevations. A dentil (rectangular block) course tops these wings. Single-story wings added from 1908 to 1910 are rusticated as is the first level of the original building. A modern steel-and-glass addition is located to the rear of the building. Despite the additions, the building's facade remains symmetrical.

The interior contains many ornate, richly finished spaces. A stunning plaster coffered ceiling tops the 23-foot (7.0 m) space of a courtroom in the original portion of the building. Decorative bands and motifs are distinguished by vivid shades of paint, which were commonly used during the Victorian era when the original portion of the building was constructed. When the ceiling was repainted as part of the 1994 to 1997 restoration, meticulous paint analysis revealed that more than 25 different colors were originally used and these were replicated. The courtroom also features articulated segmental arches over large windows separated by pilasters. Historic wood wainscot surrounds the lower portion of the room. A courtroom in the 1897 portion is clad in pink and gray Tennessee marble. The judge's bench is flanked by marble Ionic columns. Most of the original hardware, including brass window pulls and bronze ventilation grilles, remain.

Columns in the main lobby (formerly the postal lobby) are plaster that has been painted to imitate marble. The columns have cast-iron bases and capitols. Floors are covered in terrazzo with gray Tennessee marble borders. Bronze and brass are prominently used in grilles and door hardware. An open-cage elevator from the 1890s has wrought and cast-iron features that have been restored and painted with historically accurate colors. One of the first elevators in Arkansas, it is not operational due to modern safety requirements. An elaborate iron staircase with a painted iron and mahogany handrail has also been restored. The balustrade features both curvilinear and geometric motifs, and a painted rosette is located on the outside of each step. Newell posts contain the same rosette pattern as well as other colorful foliated motifs.

As part of the 1994 to 1997 renovations, GSA commissioned Jim Sanborn to create a work of art for the plaza sidewalk adjacent to the building. Entitled Ex Nexum, the sculpture consists of a text-inscribed serpentine bronze screen flanked by two tall blocks of granite. The work comments upon the changing history of the law which now allows individuals and corporations to survive financial collapse.

== Significant events ==
- 1897: First addition constructed
- 1876–1881: Building constructed
- 1908–1910: Second addition constructed
- 1932 : Federal courts and post office vacate building
- 1973 : Building listed in the National Register of Historic Places
- 1978–1992: Building declared surplus federal inventory and used by the University of Arkansas at Little Rock's William H. Bowen School of Law
- 1992: Building returned to the federal inventory
- 1994–1997: Major renovation, including construction of new rear wing

== Building facts ==
- Location: 300 West 2nd Street
- Architects: James B. Hill; William Martin; Aiken James Knox Taylor; Witsell Evans Rasco and Polk Stanley Saunders & Associates
- Construction Dates: 1876–1881; 1897; 1908–1910; 1994–1997
- Landmark Status: Listed in the National Register of Historic Places
- Architectural Style: Italian Renaissance Revival
- Primary Materials: Sandstone and Granite
- Prominent Features: Central pavilion; Restored open-cage elevator and courtrooms

== See also ==
- National Register of Historic Places listings in Little Rock, Arkansas
- List of United States post offices
