= University of Houston Libraries =

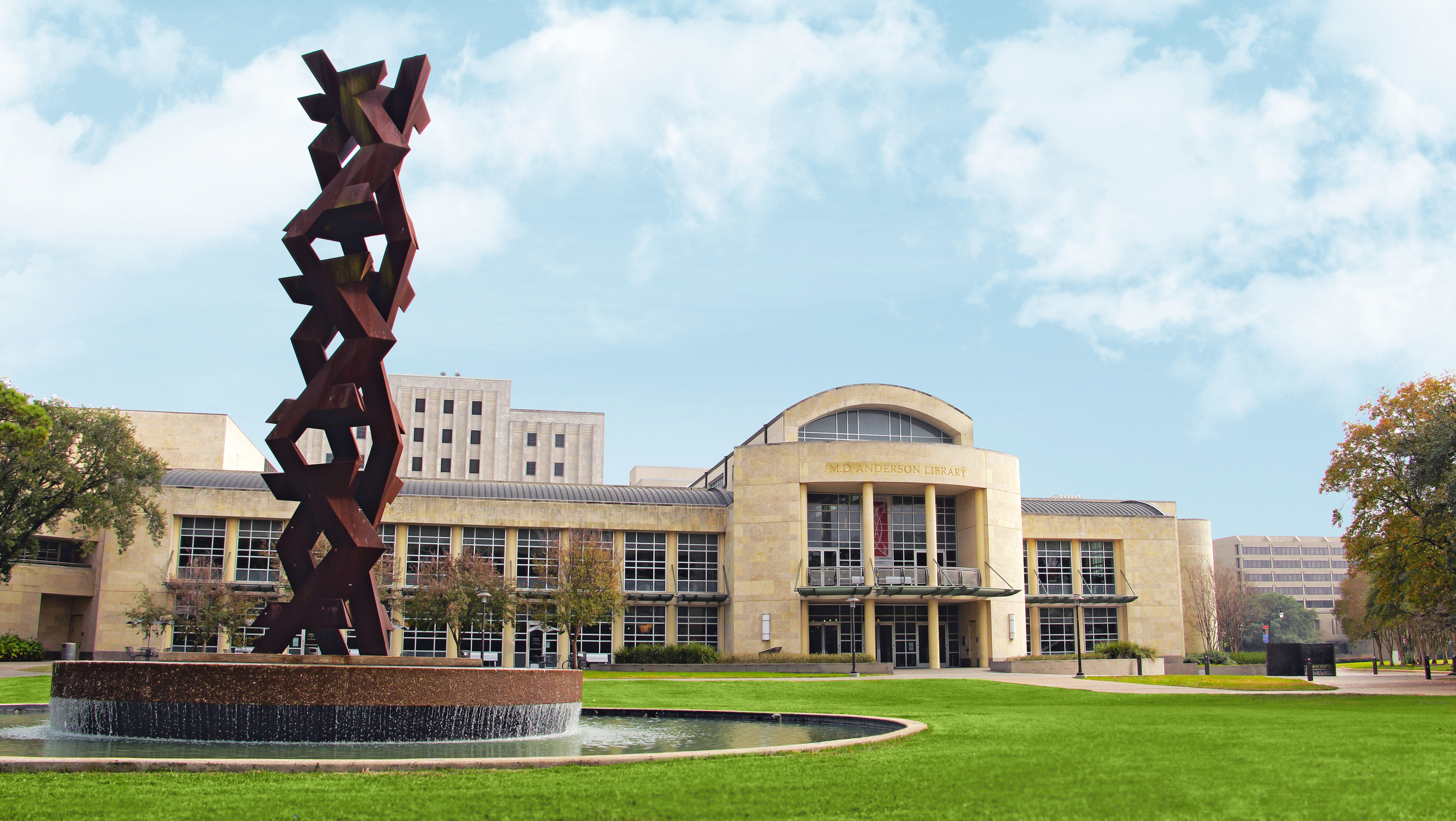
- 29.72100°N 95.34256°W
- Location: Houston, Texas
- Branches: 3

Collection
- Size: 3.2 million volumes, 724,075 e-books, 419 databases, 108,834 e-journal titles

Access and use
- Population served: 46,324 students, 3,760 faculty, UH System students and faculty, and general public

Other information
- Employees: 178
- Website: libraries.uh.edu

The University of Houston Libraries serves University of Houston (UH) students, faculty, staff and the scholarly community. The MD Anderson Library is the general collection library of the University of Houston. The UH Libraries includes three additional locations, all on the UH campus. Two other libraries, the Massad Family Library Research Center (including the Hospitality Industry Archives) and the John O'Quinn Law Library, are managed and maintained by their home colleges. Through a collaboration among libraries, students and faculty of the University of Houston–Clear Lake (UHCL), the University of Houston–Downtown (UHD), and the University of Houston–Victoria have the ability to check out circulating volumes.

== Campus libraries ==
Each individual library serves as a home to specialty collections of the university libraries. The following is a list of libraries on the University of Houston campus:

- MD Anderson Library (general collection)
- William R. Jenkins Architecture, Design, and Art Library
- Music Library
- Health Sciences Library
- Massad Family Library Research Center (Hospitality Library. Includes the Hospitality Industry Archives.)
- John O'Quinn Law Library

== History ==
The original library of the University of Houston was established in 1927 when the school was known as Houston Junior College. With 1,988 volumes, the library was housed as a section of the San Jacinto High School library, where the college shared building space. Ruth Wikoff was the school's first professional librarian. At the request of Wikoff, President Edison Oberholtzer relocated the library to its own space by converting the high school's music room.

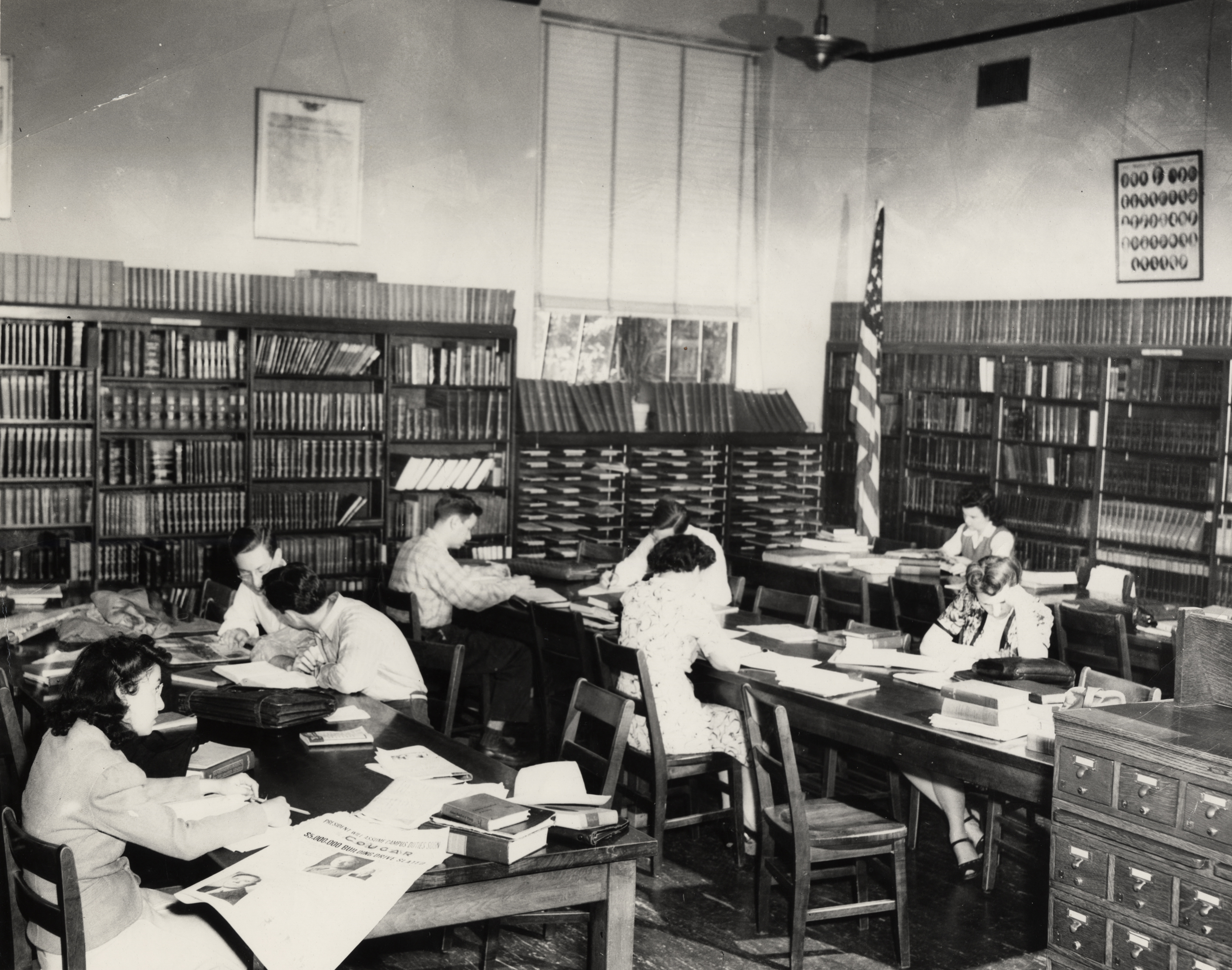
The library at the Roy G. Cullen Building in 1945, one of the main library's early homes

After Houston Junior College became the University of Houston in 1934, and moved to its current location in 1939, the library was housed in the Roy G. Cullen building; UH's first permanent building. Although originally having only three staff members, the library continued to grow by continually annexing more rooms in the building. In 1940, the library had over 12,200 volumes, and by 1951, the library had 50,000. This same year, the library, with several benefactors' help and the M.D. Anderson Foundation, was able to build the M.D. Anderson Memorial Library as a new location. Hugh Roy Cullen and Leopold Meyer donated enough money to add 6,000 more volumes to the library before it was moved into the new building. Four years later, the library's volumes reached 145,000, and expenditures were $200,000.

The university then expanded the library services by creating the University of Houston Libraries system. The Weston A. Pettey Optometry Library began as a reading room in 1952 when the College of Optometry opened. In 1967, the Pharmacy Library was established in the Lamar Fleming building on-campus to primarily serve the university's College of Pharmacy. However, in 2010, the Pharmacy library was closed and its collections integrated in the main library to allow the College of Pharmacy to reclaim the space. In the Summer of 2016, the print collection of books and bound journals located at the Weston A. Pettey Optometry Library were moved to the MD Anderson Library to make room for the new Health Sciences Library. Today, there are six branches.

In 1968, an eight-story tower was added to M.D. Anderson Library, and the Brown wing of the library was added in 1977. The most substantial changes to M.D. Anderson Library took place in 2004 when a new wing was added. The new wing was built as a front entrance to the library, along with the John O'Quinn Atrium, and a 24-hour lounge area. The university hired James Sanborn, of Kryptos fame, to build a sculpture for the library. The sculpture, entitled A,A, was erected in front of the library in June 2004.
