= Andersen Library (University of Wisconsin Whitewater) =

Coordinates: 42.842921°N 88.744791°W

- Location: 800 West Main Street; Whitewater, Wisconsin, US
- Established: 1953

Collection
- Size: More than 1 million items

Other information
- Director: Paul Waelchli
- Website: library.uww.edu

The Harold Andersen Library (also referred to as Andersen Library or HAL) is the university library of the University of Wisconsin–Whitewater. The building was named after Harold Gilbert Andersen, and ground breaking and construction for the building began on April 9, 1951.

== Creation and dedication ==
Andersen Library is the second oldest building on the University of Wisconsin- Whitewater campus, and was named in honor of Harold Gilbert Andersen. Andersen was the president of the First Citizens State Bank in Whitewater, Wisconsin, and represented the Whitewater State Teachers College on the Board of Regents from 1947 to 1960, as well as a 1917 graduate of Whitewater Normal School. Andersen was a main proprietor in convincing the Board of Regents to create a new building at Whitewater, and as a result Whitewater became the first college in the University of Wisconsin system to have a dedicated Library building.

The ground breaking for the new $725,000 building began at April 9, 1951. On February 25, 1953, faculty and students manually carried 41,000 volumes into the new building. The original building now houses the Instructional, Communication and Information Technology offices, Andersen Computing Lab, and the Center for Students with Disabilities. The library is now located in the south wing of the building, which was built in 1966 and expanded in 1970. Further renovations were done in 1989 and 1995.

== Functions and services ==
The Andersen Library provides resources and services for the students, faculty, and staff of the University of Wisconsin-Whitewater, including providing a variety of study spaces, equipment, scholarly resources, research instruction and assistance.

=== Circulation services ===
The Circulation Department is responsible for day-to-day maintenance of the library's physical collections, check-out of the diverse items in the collections, enforcement of access policies (such as loan periods and overdue fines), reservations of group study rooms, and managing course reserves and resource sharing (interlibrary loan) services.

Check-out of library materials is done at the Circulation Desk, which is located near the entrance/exit on the buildings' second (main) floor. Check-out requires a current UW-Whitewater ID, while visiting patrons from other campuses of the University of Wisconsin system are allowed to use their current "home" ID. Residents who are not part of UW-Whitewater or the UW System may purchase a Community Borrower Card in order to check out materials.

Andersen Library provides UW-Whitewater students and staff with access to the materials of other libraries either from other UW schools (UW Request]) or other libraries not associated with the UW system via ILLiad.

In addition, the library provides access to the wireless internet and a variety of equipment with the possibility of overnight check-out of laptops.

=== Reference Services ===
Instruction and assistance in research is provided by the Reference & Instruction Department using basic and/or specialized research tools. Formal instruction is provided to classes upon request of faculty and may include topics such as using library catalogs or "discovery" tools, print and licensed online resources such as article databases, resources from the Internet such as government information or digital repositories, and citation. Instruction usually is supported by online guides.

Reference librarians offer direct, personal assistance to students, university staff, faculty members and community visitors. Assistance is available at the Reference Desk, but in-person assistance is also available by appointment to meet with a librarian for more in-depth assistance. The Reference Desk is staffed during certain hours. Virtual Ask a Librarian reference services offer assistance via email or chat.

=== Equipment ===
There is a variety of equipment available at the Andersen Library available for anyone with a valid UWW ID. In order to check out items patrons must have a loan agreement on file and should not have an excessive amount of fines on their library account. All equipment provided is available on a first-come, first-served basis and items cannot be renewed or be reserved. In case the item consists of several parts, the item is only considered returned, if all parts have been returned.

Overview of available Equipment:

- Cameras
- Computers
- Tablets & E-readers
- Video Game Equipment
- Adaptive Equipment
- DVD & VHS Equipment
- Miscellaneous Equipment
- Laptop Availability

== Learning spaces ==
The Andersen Library provides an array of study places with both quiet areas and areas where moderate talking is allowed.

=== 1st Floor ===
The lower level of Andersen Library, accessible from within the library via stairs or elevator, contains Special Collections., microforms, bound periodicals, current periodicals, government documents, a library classroom, as well as two collaboratories. One of the collaboratories contains a SMARTBoard, the other has a large monitor. Both may be reserved through Circulation. Special Collections includes the university archives, campus records management, and public records from Jefferson, Rock, and Walworth counties (as part of the Area Research Center Network of the Wisconsin Historical Society. This is a quiet floor.

=== 2nd (Main) Floor ===
The main floor is the "talking floor" where group work, moderate conversation, listening to music (headphones only), sound on computers, and respectful use of cell phones is allowed. A gaming room is available. The Veterans and Service Members Lounge and a campus police substation are located on 2nd floor.

On this floor the library provides group study rooms. They contain whiteboards and wall-mounted monitors.

The collections on 2nd floor include reference collection; current magazines and newspapers; graphic novels; children's books; PreK-12 textbooks and teaching tools; browsing collections of books, DVDs, audio books, CDs and video games; as well as an area dedicated to new items.

==== Food for Thought Café ====
This café is located on the 2nd floor, near the entrance and exit doors and Circulation Desk. Students and staff can buy sandwiches, cookies, soup, soda, coffee, hot chocolate, salads, and more at the Food for Thought Café. There is an area just outside the café for students to eat or drink and a microwave available outside the café. The hours of the café vary, and they are posted on the University of Wisconsin-Whitewater's dining website.

=== Third floor ===
The third floor is a quiet floor and has individual study rooms, a reservable group study room, as well as the Main Collection of books.
