= RR Auction =

American auction house

- Founded: Amherst, New Hampshire, 1976
- Founder: Bob Eaton
- Headquarters: Boston, Massachusetts, United States of America
- Area served: Global
- Key people: Bob Eaton, Bobby Livingston
- Services: Auction House, Art valuation
- Website: www.rrauction.com

RR Auction is an auction house established in 1976 by Bob Eaton. The company headquarters is in Boston with a production office based in Amherst, New Hampshire. The company is known for its monthly auctions of historical documents, manuscripts, autographs, artifacts, sports collectibles, spaceflight memorabilia, presidential items and more. The auction house has developed a worldwide client base and publishes monthly catalogs in print and online via issuu.

== History ==
In 1976, 19-year-old Bob Eaton, who recently graduated from Newton North High School, purchased, with help from his grandfather, $1,800 worth of sports memorabilia. The memorabilia included a Babe Ruth baseball and Red Sox World Series programs. He then proceeded to sell them for ten times his original purchase price. Eaton continued to sell sports cards and signed memorabilia out of his basement afterwards. In 1980, he decided to send out a mailing list of the items he had available for sale—thus founding the company in Newton Centre, Massachusetts.

In the 1990s, Eaton moved to New Hampshire to sell his merchandise. In 1995, RR Auction switched from retail sales to auctioning; Eaton settled in Amherst, New Hampshire, where the company maintains office to this day. At that time, the company was making a niche selling collectible autographs; later adding American history and pop culture-related items in the auctions.

RR Auction launched the option for online bidding in 2004. This has contributed to the growth of the company over the years. In 2009, RR Auction brought in $8 million in annual revenue. In 2010, RR Auction ventured into auctioning space-related items, beginning with a headset worn by astronaut Charlie Duke. The company later became known for selling artifacts of spaceflight history. In 2014, the company opened an auction gallery in a new 1,500 square-foot facility in Boston's North End community after expanding considerably after the launch of their website; the gallery is intended for displaying auction items, as well as for VIP benefits and live auctions.

In 2018, after decades of selling historical documents, artifacts and autographs, RR auction went back to its roots, auctioning more than 650 sports-themed collectibles, in a strictly sports memorabilia auction set on June 14–21 of that year.

In June 2021, RR auction was hired by Jeff Bezos' space company, Blue Origin, to auction a seat in the capsule New Shepard, that went to space on July 20, 2021.

== Notable items and auctions ==
=== Historical ===
- Documents connected with the Alamo, including receipts signed by William Barret Travis and Antonio Lopez de Santa Anna's map, were featured at auction in November 2011. Part of the proceeds were donated to the Children's Bereavement Center of South Texas.
- A pair of Bonnie Parker and Clyde Barrow's guns sold for over $500,000 in September 2012. These guns were carried by the outlaws when they were killed by officers in 1934.
- President John F. Kennedy's 1963 Lincoln Continental convertible sold for $318,000 in October 2013. This convertible was an official vehicle used to transport the First Couple, designated "Limo One", noteworthy as the last automobile to safely carry Kennedy before his assassination in Dallas.
- Over 400 items from the collection of Raleigh DeGeer Amyx, including Abraham Lincoln's eyeglasses, Dwight D. Eisenhower's Rolex watch, and Franklin Delano Roosevelt's cane, were offered at auction in September 2014.
- An original White House plinth sold at auction, salvaged by Joseph Williamson Jr. when Theodore Roosevelt remodeled the White House in 1902.
- A George Washington-signed letter sent to Timothy Pickering (Washington's secretary of state) was sold in January 2017 for over $61,000. The letter was written only one year after George Washington left the office.
- In March 2017 RR Auction managed to sell a partly-printed document signed by Queen Elizabeth I. The document, which carries the crisp signature of Queen Elizabeth at the head was in very good, almost fine condition and was sold for $36,750.
- A Thomas Lynch Jr. (signer of the Declaration of Independence) signature was sold in May 2017 for $24,504.90. The signature was accompanied by a series of documents meant to certify its provenance and authenticity, including a certificate of authenticity from Charles Hamilton dated on September 18, 1995.
- John F. Kennedy's diary was sold at RR Auction in April 2017 for $718,750. That was the diary that John F. Kennedy kept as a Hearst reporter during the summer of 1945 and which included a series of remarkable comments and personal observations regarding notable historical figures of the time.
- In July 2017 RR Auction managed to sell two of Dr. John Warren's amputation kits that he used in the Revolutionary War. Dr. John Warren was one of the founders of Harvard Medical School and worked as a militia volunteer and surgeon. The amputation kits were sold for over $104.000.
- In September 2024, RR Auction announced the discovery of previously unseen footage showing President John F. Kennedy’s motorcade traveling to Parkland Memorial Hospital shortly after the assassination. The 8mm film, recorded by Texas businessman Dale Carpenter Sr., depicts scenes on the Stemmons Freeway, including Secret Service agent Clint Hill positioned on the rear of the presidential limousine. According to RR Auction, the footage is the only known recording of the motorcade on the freeway between Dealey Plaza and the hospital. It was sold at auction on September 28, 2024, for $137,500.

=== Music ===
- A first-issue mono pressing of Sgt. Pepper's Lonely Hearts Club Band signed by all four of the Beatles sold at auction for $175,698 in January 2014.
- Johnny Ramone's personally owned, stage-used red Mosrite guitar sold at auction for $71,875 in January 2015.
- A Wolfgang Amadeus Mozart autograph letter, written in 1786 to his friend the Austrian botanist Nikolaus Joseph von Jacquin, sold at auction for $217,000 in October 2015.
- A Hummer owned and customized by rapper Tupac Shakur, purchased by him just three months before his death, sold for $337,114 in May 2016.
- A handwritten and signed acceptance speech from Prince for the 1993 Brit Awards was sold in March 2017 for $32,129. The speech was read by Kylie Minogue, in acceptance of the award for Best International Artist of that year. The speech was part of a bigger batch of one of a kind items that ranged from $20,000 on an album that did not get released to $25,000 on a jacket.
- In April 2017 a copy of Pink Floyd's album The Dark Side of the Moon signed by the band members was sold at RR Auction for almost $28,000. The album did not include the record, but carried the signatures of Roger Waters, Davis Gilmour, Nick Manson and Richard Wright.
- In early 2017 RR Auction sold a love letter signed by Judy Garland and addressed to Frank Sinatra. The letter actually confirms the rumors about the two having had an affair while Judy Garland was still married. The 1950s love letter was sold for $5,897.15.

=== Space ===
- In June 2010, RR auction held its first auction of space-related items. Included in the 500-item auction is the headset worn by Astronaut Charlie Duke to listen to Neil Armstrong's pronouncement: "Houston, Tranquility Base here. The Eagle has landed."
- September 2011: Alan Shepard's letter to his parents regarding him trying out for the "Man in Space" program, written in 1959, was sold at auction for $106,000.
- November 2014: A 1962 Hasselblad camera body and Zeiss lens that saw use in orbital photo experiments on NASA missions sold at auction.
- April 2015: The first Apollo mission's flight software, a Block II Apollo Guidance computer display and keyboard built by MIT computer scientist Margaret Hamilton, sold at auction.
- October 2015: The only privately owned watch worn on the surface of the Moon, owned and worn by astronaut David Scott on Apollo 15 in 1971, sold for $1.625 million.
- One of the most valuable items sold by RR Auction in 2017 was a rescue arrow decal which was attached to the crew hatch of Apollo 11-flown command module Columbia. The item was estimated at $100,000 and was eventually sold for over $147,000.
- In June 2021, RR auction sold a seat, and the chance to travel into space with Jeff Bezos, in the space capsule, New Shepard. An anonymous bidder won the seat, bidding $28,000,000.
- On October 21, 2022, an Omega Speedmaster Professional chronograph commemorating the Apollo 11 Moon landing was sold for $1,525,563 to an unidentified bidder.

=== Cultural ===
- January 2012: A final letter written by the Titanic's bandleader, 33-year-old Wallace Hartley, sold at auction for $155,000.
- January 2013: A 1970s photograph showing Princess Diana and an unknown man sold for $18,396.
- April 2014: The first email ever sent by an American President, sent by Bill Clinton to astronaut John Glenn in 1998, sold at auction for more than $11,000.
- November 2015: The white 2003 Cadillac Escalade used during the final three seasons of The Sopranos, the interior signed by the late actor James Gandolfini, sold for $119,780.
- A 1924 Chamonix Winter Olympics Official's badge was put up for auction in January 2017 and sold for over $33,000, although the initial estimate was of $25,000. The badge was sold with the original light blue ribbon and it belonged to a figure skating judge.

=== Notable figures ===
- June 2009: An iconic photograph of Albert Einstein sticking out his tongue, signed by the theoretical physicist himself, sold at auction for $74,000.
- 2010: A Charles Darwin signed portrait by Julia Margaret Cameron sold at auction for a record-setting $27,579.
- 2012: An Edgar Allan Poe letter to Sarah Josepha Hale, editor of a literary publication and author of "Mary Had a Little Lamb," sold at auction for $164,000.
- August 2013: A letter written by German businessman Oskar Schindler, who saved nearly 1,200 Jews from Nazi death camps, dated August 22, 1944 and asking permission to move his factory from Kraków, Poland into Czechoslovakia, sold for over $21,000.
- April 2013: Truman Capote's 86-page typed hand-notated manuscript for the 1958 novella Breakfast at Tiffany's sold for over $300,000.
- In 2014, a handwritten John Lennon letter sells for $28,000
- February 2016: A collection of author Mario Puzo's papers, including multiple drafts of The Godfather novel and movie screenplay, sold at auction for $625,000. The 45-box archive was put up for auction by Puzo's children.
- In February 2017, RR Auction sold an autographed picture of Marilyn Monroe. The inscription reads "To Tony, Love & Kisses, Marilyn Monroe." and the photo, which was taken during a press conference for The Prince and the Showgirl was sold for more than $19,000.
- A pay order signed by Isaac Newton issued to "the Accountant General of the South Sea Company," went up for auction in June 2017 and was sold for $53,805.68.
- Al Capone's diamond watch was auctioned off in June 2017 and sold $84,375. The 14 karat white gold and platinum watch was especially made for the infamous gangster as the case bears his initials "AC" out of twenty-three cut diamonds.
- On August 19, 2021, RR Auction sold, various items signed by Steve Jobs. Among that lot was an Apple II instruction manual that sold for $787,484, setting the world record for a Steve Jobs signed item.
- In August 2022, an Apple-1 Computer prototype used by Apple co-founder Steve Jobs in 1976 was sold to an anonymous collector for the amount of $677,196.
- In September 2022, Jennifer Gwyne, put up personal items such as an emerald necklace and a signed birthday card, that were given to him by her former boyfriend, Elon Musk, on auction.
- In the summer of 2023, the gold medal of the famous Soviet figure skater Alexander Zaitsev, received for winning the 1980 Olympics in Lake Placid, was auctioned off. The price was 93 thousand dollars. Zaitsev himself said that he had nothing to do with the sale - after a divorce from his skating partner Irina Rodnina, he was not interested in the fate of his awards.
