= Kryptos =

Encrypted sculpture by American artist Jim Sanborn

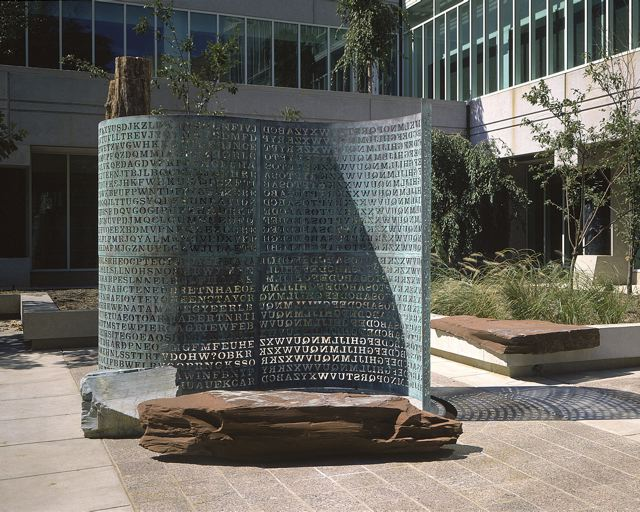
- Artist: Jim Sanborn
- Year: 1990
- Dimensions: 11–12 feet (3.4–3.7 m) × 20 feet (6.1 m)
- Location: George Bush Center for Intelligence, Langley, Virginia, U.S.

Kryptos is a sculpture by the American artist Jim Sanborn located on the grounds of the Central Intelligence Agency (CIA) headquarters, the George Bush Center for Intelligence in Langley, Virginia.

Since its dedication on November 3, 1990, there has been much speculation about the meaning of the four encrypted messages—most using a Vigenère cipher with a keyed alphabet that uses the keyword "KRYPTOS"—it bears. Of these four messages, the first three have been solved, while the fourth message remains one of the most famous unsolved codes in the world. Artist Jim Sanborn has hinted that a fifth coded message will reveal itself after the first four are solved. The sculpture continues to be of interest to cryptanalysts, both amateur and professional, attempting to decode the fourth passage. The artist has so far given four clues to this passage.

== Description ==
Close-up view of part of the text

The sculpture comprises four large copper plates with other elements consisting of water, wood, plants, red and green granite, white quartz, and petrified wood. The most prominent feature of the entire piece is a large vertical S-shaped copper screen resembling a scroll or a piece of paper emerging from a computer printer, half of which consists of encrypted text, that is located in the northwest corner of the New Headquarters Building courtyard, outside of the agency's cafeteria. The characters are all found within the 26 letters of the Latin alphabet, along with question marks, and are cut out of the copper plates. The main sculpture contains four separate enigmatic messages, three of which have been deciphered.

In addition to the main part of the sculpture, Sanborn also placed other pieces of art on the CIA grounds, such as several large granite slabs with sandwiched copper sheets outside the entrance to the New Headquarters Building. Several Morse code messages are found on these copper sheets, and one of the stone slabs has an engraving of a compass rose pointing to a lodestone. The ciphers' increasing "complexity" through the entrance into the courtyard is intended to be as if it "were a fossil". Other elements of Sanborn's installation include a landscaped garden area, a fish pond with opposing wooden benches, a reflecting pool, and other pieces of stone, including a triangle-shaped black stone slab.

The name Kryptos comes from the ancient Greek word for "hidden", and the theme of the sculpture is "intelligence gathering". The cost of building the sculpture in 1988 was US$250,000 (worth ~US$660,000 in 2024).

== Encrypted messages ==
The ciphertext on the left-hand side (as seen from the courtyard) of the main sculpture contains 869 characters in total: 865 letters and 4 question marks. In April 2006, Sanborn released information stating that a letter was omitted from this side of Kryptos "for aesthetic reasons, to keep the sculpture visually balanced". There are also three misspelled words in the plaintext of the deciphered first three passages, which Sanborn has claimed was intentional, and three letters ("YAR") near the beginning of the bottom half of the left side are the only characters on the sculpture in superscript.

The right-hand side of the sculpture comprises a keyed Vigenère encryption tableau, consisting of 867 letters. One of the lines of the Vigenère tableau has an extra character (L). Bauer, Link, and Molle suggest that this may be a reference to the Hill cipher as an encryption method for the fourth passage of the sculpture, as with that extra L, the letters HILL appear consecutively down the rightmost column. However, Sanborn omitted the extra letter from the small Kryptos models that he sold.

The encryptions that were ascribed
Left side, as seen from the courtyard (Note: The left-side encryptions are often divided into four sections: K1, K2, K3 and K4.: K1: "EMUFPHZLRFAXYUSDJKZLDKRNSHGNFIVJ YQTQUXQBQVYUVLLTREVJYQTMKYRDMFD" K2: "VFPJUDEEHZWETZYVGWHKKQETGFQJNCE GGWHKK?DQMCPFQZDQMMIAGPFXHQRLG TIMVMZJANQLVKQEDAGDVFRPJUNGEUNA QZGZLECGYUXUEENJTBJLBQCRTBJDFHRR YIZETKZEMVDUFKSJHKFWHKUWQLSZFTI HHDDDUVH?DWKBFUFPWNTDFIYCUQZERE EVLDKFEZMOQQJLTTUGSYQPFEUNLAVIDX FLGGTEZ?FKZBSFDQVGOGIPUFXHHDRKF FHQNTGPUAECNUVPDJMQCLQUMUNEDFQ ELZZVRRGKFFVOEEXBDMVPNFQXEZLGRE DNQFMPNZGLFLPMRJQYALMGNUVPDXVKP DQUMEBEDMHDAFMJGZNUPLGEWJLLAETG" / K3: "ENDYAHROHNLSRHEOCPTEOIBIDYSHNAIA CHTNREYULDSLLSLLNOHSNOSMRWXMNE TPRNGATIHNRARPESLNNELEBLPIIACAE WMTWNDITEENRAHCTENEUDRETNHAEOE TFOLSEDTIWENHAEIOYTEYQHEENCTAYCR EIFTBRSPAMHHEWENATAMATEGYEERLB TEEFOASFIOTUETUAEOTOARMAEERTNRTI BSEDDNIAAHTTMSTEWPIEROAGRIEWFEB AECTDDHILCEIHSITEGOEAOSDDRYDLORIT RKLMLEHAGTDHARDPNEOHMGFMFEUHE ECDMRIPFEIMEHNLSSTTRTVDOHW?" K4: "OBKR UOXOGHULBSOLIFBBWFLRVQQPRNGKSSO TWTQSJQSSEKZZWATJKLUDIAWINFBNYP VTTMZFPKWGDKZXTJCDIGKUHUAUEKCAR")

EMUFPHZLRFAXYUSDJKZLDKRNSHGNFIVJ
YQTQUXQBQVYUVLLTREVJYQTMKYRDMFD
VFPJUDEEHZWETZYVGWHKKQETGFQJNCE
GGWHKK?DQMCPFQZDQMMIAGPFXHQRLG
TIMVMZJANQLVKQEDAGDVFRPJUNGEUNA
QZGZLECGYUXUEENJTBJLBQCRTBJDFHRR
YIZETKZEMVDUFKSJHKFWHKUWQLSZFTI
HHDDDUVH?DWKBFUFPWNTDFIYCUQZERE
EVLDKFEZMOQQJLTTUGSYQPFEUNLAVIDX
FLGGTEZ?FKZBSFDQVGOGIPUFXHHDRKF
FHQNTGPUAECNUVPDJMQCLQUMUNEDFQ
ELZZVRRGKFFVOEEXBDMVPNFQXEZLGRE
DNQFMPNZGLFLPMRJQYALMGNUVPDXVKP
DQUMEBEDMHDAFMJGZNUPLGEWJLLAETG
ENDYAHROHNLSRHEOCPTEOIBIDYSHNAIA
CHTNREYULDSLLSLLNOHSNOSMRWXMNE
TPRNGATIHNRARPESLNNELEBLPIIACAE
WMTWNDITEENRAHCTENEUDRETNHAEOE
TFOLSEDTIWENHAEIOYTEYQHEENCTAYCR
EIFTBRSPAMHHEWENATAMATEGYEERLB
TEEFOASFIOTUETUAEOTOARMAEERTNRTI
BSEDDNIAAHTTMSTEWPIEROAGRIEWFEB
AECTDDHILCEIHSITEGOEAOSDDRYDLORIT
RKLMLEHAGTDHARDPNEOHMGFMFEUHE
ECDMRIPFEIMEHNLSSTTRTVDOHW?OBKR
UOXOGHULBSOLIFBBWFLRVQQPRNGKSSO
TWTQSJQSSEKZZWATJKLUDIAWINFBNYP
VTTMZFPKWGDKZXTJCDIGKUHUAUEKCAR

Right side, as seen from the courtyard

 ABCDEFGHIJKLMNOPQRSTUVWXYZABCD
AKRYPTOSABCDEFGHIJLMNQUVWXZKRYP
BRYPTOSABCDEFGHIJLMNQUVWXZKRYPT
CYPTOSABCDEFGHIJLMNQUVWXZKRYPTO
DPTOSABCDEFGHIJLMNQUVWXZKRYPTOS
ETOSABCDEFGHIJLMNQUVWXZKRYPTOSA
FOSABCDEFGHIJLMNQUVWXZKRYPTOSAB
GSABCDEFGHIJLMNQUVWXZKRYPTOSABC
HABCDEFGHIJLMNQUVWXZKRYPTOSABCD
IBCDEFGHIJLMNQUVWXZKRYPTOSABCDE
JCDEFGHIJLMNQUVWXZKRYPTOSABCDEF
KDEFGHIJLMNQUVWXZKRYPTOSABCDEFG
LEFGHIJLMNQUVWXZKRYPTOSABCDEFGH
MFGHIJLMNQUVWXZKRYPTOSABCDEFGHI
NGHIJLMNQUVWXZKRYPTOSABCDEFGHIJL
OHIJLMNQUVWXZKRYPTOSABCDEFGHIJL
PIJLMNQUVWXZKRYPTOSABCDEFGHIJLM
QJLMNQUVWXZKRYPTOSABCDEFGHIJLMN
RLMNQUVWXZKRYPTOSABCDEFGHIJLMNQ
SMNQUVWXZKRYPTOSABCDEFGHIJLMNQU
TNQUVWXZKRYPTOSABCDEFGHIJLMNQUV
UQUVWXZKRYPTOSABCDEFGHIJLMNQUVW
VUVWXZKRYPTOSABCDEFGHIJLMNQUVWX
WVWXZKRYPTOSABCDEFGHIJLMNQUVWXZ
XWXZKRYPTOSABCDEFGHIJLMNQUVWXZK
YXZKRYPTOSABCDEFGHIJLMNQUVWXZKR
ZZKRYPTOSABCDEFGHIJLMNQUVWXZKRY
 ABCDEFGHIJKLMNOPQRSTUVWXYZABCD

Sanborn worked with a retiring CIA employee named Edward Scheidt to come up with the cryptographic systems used on the sculpture. Edward Scheidt stated that the difficulty of the encryption was around nine out of ten. He said that his intention was for it to be solved in five to ten years. He also said that there was an intentional "change in the methodology" of the encryption. Sanborn also suggested in a 2005 interview that should he die before the entire sculpture is deciphered, he had put in place a method by which a correct solution could be confirmed. In 2020, Sanborn stated that he planned to put the secret to the solution up for auction once he died.

In August 2025, Sanborn announced that the K4 solution as well as a prototype sculpture, encryption tables, and other related ephemera would be auctioned by the firm RR Auction later in the year.

In October 2025, the Kryptos auction was formally posted by RR Auction as part of the sale titled "Decoding History: Kryptos, Enigma and the Rosetta Stone", running from 16 October to 20 November 2025. As part of the same collection, a signed first-edition set of Howard Carter’s The Tomb of Tut-ankh-Amen was listed as running from 16 October to 20 November 2025.

Sanborn had stated that the sculpture contains a riddle within a riddle, which will be solvable only after the four encrypted passages have been deciphered. He has given conflicting information about the sculpture's answer, saying at one time that he gave the complete solution to the then-CIA director William Webster during the dedication ceremony, but later, he also said that he had not given Webster the entire solution. He did, however, confirm that a passage of the plaintext of the second message reads, "Who knows the exact location? Only WW." (Note: "WW" has been speculated to be a reference to William Webster.)

== Solvers ==
The first person to announce publicly that he had solved the first three passages was Jim Gillogly, a computer scientist from southern California, who deciphered these passages using a computer, and revealed his solutions in 1999. After Gillogly's announcement, the CIA revealed that their analyst David Stein had solved the same passages in 1998 using pencil and paper techniques, although at the time of his solution the information was only disseminated within the intelligence community. No public announcement was made until July 1999, although in November 1998 it was revealed that "a CIA analyst working on his own time [had] solved 'the lion's share' of it".

The NSA claimed that some of their employees had solved the same three passages but would not reveal names or dates until March 2000, when it was learned that an NSA team led by Ken Miller, along with Dennis McDaniels and two other unnamed individuals, had solved passages 1–3 in late 1992. In 2013, in response to a Freedom of Information Act request by Elonka Dunin, the NSA released documents that show these attempts to solve the Kryptos puzzle in 1992, following a challenge by Bill Studeman, then Deputy Director of the CIA. The documents show that by June 1993, a small group of NSA cryptanalysts had succeeded in solving the first three passages of the sculpture.

All previous attempts to solve Kryptos found that passage 2 ended with "WESTIDBYROWS". However, in 2005, Nicole Friedrich, a logician from Vancouver, British Columbia, Canada, determined that another possible plaintext was "WESTXLAYERTWO". On April 19, 2006, Sanborn contacted an online community dedicated to the Kryptos puzzle to inform them that he made an error in the sculpture by omitting an S in the ciphertext (an X in the plaintext), and he confirmed that the last passage of the plaintext was "WESTXLAYERTWO", and not "WESTIDBYROWS".

== Solutions ==
The following are the decryptions of passages 1–3 of the sculpture. Blank spaces have been added to the texts for readability, but any misspellings present in the text are included verbatim.

=== Morse code ===
The translations of the International Morse code (sometimes called K0) that are ascribed to the copper slabs when read facing the south: (Note: Sources might write "INTERPRETATIT" as "INTERPRETATIU" or "INTERPRETATIO[N]" due to the presumed dash that is consistent with O in International Morse code. (anonymous) (May 17, 2009). "Kryptos – Beyond K4". Photos by Jim Gillgoly. Morse Code. Archived from the original on December 26, 2015. And the E after "POSITION" is sometimes not present. Wilson. "Morse Code" (TXT). Contributions by Eric Hall. Archived from the original on May 13, 2023.)

E E VIRTUALLY E | E E E E E E INVISIBLE

DIGETAL E E E | INTERPRETATIT

E E SHADOW E E | FORCES E E E E E

LUCID E E E | MEMORY E

T IS YOUR | POSITION E

SOS

RQ

=== Solution of passage 1 ===
- Method: Vigenère
- Keywords: Vigenère alphabet "KRYPTOSABCDEFGHIJLMNQUVWXZ", a pattern found in the right hand panel, and Vigenère key "PALIMPSEST"

BETWEEN SUBTLE SHADING AND THE ABSENCE OF LIGHT LIES THE NUANCE OF IQLUSION

The word IQLUSION was claimed to be an intentional misspelling of ILLUSION by the creator, Jim Sanborn, which is reinforced by how it appears on the original coding charts provided by Sanborn himself.

On line 7, column 26 of the original coding chart, the keyword "PALIMPSEST" is actually misspelled with a C, whereas the word ILLUSION is correctly spelled out above it. When the KRYPTOS Vigenère tableau is used to encode the word ILLUSION into ciphertext with the keyword PALIMPCEST, the combination of the first L in ILLUSION and the C in PALIMPCEST renders a K in the ciphertext, which is how it appears on the original coding chart and is correctly transcribed onto the sculpture. If this particular instance of the keyword did not contain the spelling error, the letter K would encode to W instead. Conversely, if the plaintext word IQLUSION had been encoded with a properly spelled keyword, the resulting ciphertext letter K would accurately reflect what is seen on the sculpture. This form of 'intentional' spelling error has also occurred in passage 2 with the word UNDERGROUND, but in this case the keyword and ciphertext all appear correctly on the coding chart. Whether it was intentional or not, a change occurred during the transcription phase of the ciphertext onto the sculpture.

Due to the previous issue of an omitted S that was later disclosed as error, it is unknown whether these artifacts were intended to be part of the puzzle, meant to simply throw people off, or were errors in the creation process. When Sanborn was questioned about the process, his response was “You could not make any mistake with 1,800 letters. It could not be repaired.” This is compounded by Sanborn's previous statements in 2005, claiming "most of my things are rife with mistakes on purpose."

The keywords PALIMPSEST and ABSCISSA can be anagrammed into "P.S. It's as simple as ABC."

=== Solution of passage 2 ===
- Method: Vigenère
- Keywords: Vigenère alphabet "KRYPTOSABCDEFGHIJLMNQUVWXZ" and Vigenère key "ABSCISSA"

IT WAS TOTALLY INVISIBLE HOWS THAT POSSIBLE ? THEY USED THE EARTHS MAGNETIC FIELD X THE INFORMATION WAS GATHERED AND TRANSMITTED UNDERGRUUND TO AN UNKNOWN LOCATION X DOES LANGLEY KNOW ABOUT THIS ? THEY SHOULD ITS BURIED OUT THERE SOMEWHERE X WHO KNOWS THE EXACT LOCATION ? ONLY WW THIS WAS HIS LAST MESSAGE X THIRTY EIGHT DEGREES FIFTY SEVEN MINUTES SIX POINT FIVE SECONDS NORTH SEVENTY SEVEN DEGREES EIGHT MINUTES FORTY FOUR SECONDS WEST X LAYER TWO

In section 6 of the original coding charts, the plaintext word UNDERGROUND is correctly spelled, and columns 20–27 of the tableau also contain the correct spelling of the keyword "ABSCISSA", with the corresponding letter E in the ciphertext directly under the O. However, when transcribed onto the sculpture, the letter E somehow became an R. When the KRYPTOS Vigenère tableau is used to decode this message, the combination of R in the ciphertext and S in the keyword renders a U in the plaintext. The coordinates mentioned in the plaintext, 38°57′6.5″N 77°8′44″W, have been interpreted using a modern Geodetic datum as indicating a point that is approximately 174 feet (53 meters) southeast of the sculpture.

=== Solution of passage 3 ===
- Method: Transposition
  SLOWLY DESPARATLY SLOWLY THE REMAINS OF PASSAGE DEBRIS THAT ENCUMBERED THE LOWER PART OF THE DOORWAY WAS REMOVED WITH TREMBLING HANDS I MADE A TINY BREACH IN THE UPPER LEFT HAND CORNER AND THEN WIDENING THE HOLE A LITTLE I INSERTED THE CANDLE AND PEERED IN THE HOT AIR ESCAPING FROM THE CHAMBER CAUSED THE FLAME TO FLICKER BUT PRESENTLY DETAILS OF THE ROOM WITHIN EMERGED FROM THE MIST X CAN YOU SEE ANYTHING Q ?

The text is a paraphrased quotation from Howard Carter's account of the opening of the tomb of Tutankhamun on November 26, 1922, as described in his 1923 book The Tomb of Tut-ankh-Amun. Lord Carnarvon anxiously asks him "Can you see anything?" and Carter responds, "Yes, wonderful things." Carter's own account is adapted from his 1922 excavation journal where his response to the question is "Yes, it is wonderful".

== Clues given for passage 4 ==
When commenting in 2006 about his error in passage 2, Sanborn said that the answers to the first three passages contain clues to the fourth passage. In November 2010, Sanborn released a clue, publicly stating that "NYPVTT", the 64th to 69th letters in passage 4, become "BERLIN" after decryption.

Sanborn gave The New York Times another clue in November 2014: the letters "MZFPK", the 70th through 74th letters in passage 4, become "CLOCK" after decryption. The 74th letter is K in both the plaintext and ciphertext, meaning that it is possible for a character to encrypt to itself. Sanborn further stated that in order to solve passage 4, "You'd better delve into that particular clock", but added: "There are several really interesting clocks in Berlin." In 2025, Sanborn confirmed that the plaintext referred to the World Clock.

In an article published on January 29, 2020, by The New York Times, Sanborn gave another clue: at positions 26 to 34, ciphertext "QQPRNGKSS" is the word "NORTHEAST".

In August 2020, Sanborn revealed that the four letters in positions 22 through 25, ciphertext "FLRV", in the plaintext are "EAST". Sanborn commented that he "released this layout to several people as early as April".

=== Auction ===
In an August 2025 letter to The Washington Post, Sanborn announced his plan to auction off the solution for the final passage, writing that he hoped the buyer would keep the fourth passage a secret, offering the following clue: "If they don't then (CLUE) what's the point? . . . Power resides with a secret not without it." He stated that he planned to auction off the solution for the fourth passage on November 20, his 80th birthday. It was auctioned by Boston-based RR Auction and had been expected to fetch a price between $300,000 and $500,000. In the same letter, Sanborn wrote that the decision to sell the solution "has not been an easy one" and acknowledged "many in the Kryptos community will find it upsetting," but, "I no longer have the physical, mental or financial resources" to maintain the code and continue other projects.

In October 2025, the auction was formally posted by RR Auction as part of the sale titled "Decoding History: Kryptos, Enigma and the Rosetta Stone", running from 16 October to 20 November 2025. The catalogue included Sanborn’s Kryptos archive—comprising the K4 solution, a prototype, encryption tables, and related ephemera—alongside a signed first-edition set of Howard Carter’s The Tomb of Tut-ankh-Amen listed in the same catalogue. The Kryptos archive ultimately sold for $962,500 at the conclusion of the auction.

In June 2026, the venture capital firm Paradigm disclosed that it had been the anonymous winning bidder for the archive, which included the unpublished solution to K4. The firm also launched a Kryptos website and a ten-puzzle "capture-the-flag"-style challenge inviting the public to attempt K4, with $1,000 awarded to the first solver of each puzzle.

=== Discovery in the Smithsonian Archives ===
In September 2025, journalists Jarett Kobek and Richard Byrne discovered several documents among papers donated by Jim Sanborn to Smithsonian's Archives of American Art containing scraps of text that, when assembled together, produced what appeared likely to be the full plaintext of K4 (i.e., the "solution" to K4); they submitted this text to Sanborn, who confirmed its accuracy, explaining that he had mistakenly included those scraps in the donated archives while compiling documents during cancer treatment years earlier. Shortly thereafter, Sanborn asked the Smithsonian to seal the relevant files for the next 50 years (until 2075), and they complied.

After consulting with the auction house, Sanborn requested Kobek and Byrne to sign NDAs, which they refused. Kobek and Byrne also allege that lawyers for the auction house contacted them and threatened the two with copyright infringement and interference with contracts, if they were to publicly release the K4 plaintext.

Kobek said he has heard conflicting information about how long the documents had actually been at the Smithsonian before discovery, ranging from 2010 at the earliest to February 2024, or approximately 18 months before the K4 plaintext was discovered. The date for the donation, as currently displayed on the Finding Aid for the Smithsonian site, is 2023.

Kobek and Byrne mentioned sifting through several other examples of Sanborn's work in the Smithsonian archives before stumbling across the K4 plaintext, as during an interview with Wired News in 2005, Sanborn was asked if it was important to look at his other works, before and after Kryptos, to understand Kryptos. His response was "For the student of cryptography it's always helpful to gather as much information as possible when zeroing in on and encoding a system." Kobek claims that in March 2019, a group of select members that attended an annual "Kryptos Dinner" had the opportunity to ask Sanborn directly about submissions regarding K4, claiming that Sanborn at that time said he "did not care" what method someone used to solve it.

In an open letter in August 2025, Sanborn confirmed the existence of K5, which will be revealed after K4 has been solved.

== Related sculptures ==
After producing Kryptos, Sanborn's first cryptographic sculpture, he went on to make several other sculptures with codes, including an "Untitled Kryptos Piece" and Cyrillic Projector, which contain encrypted Russian Cyrillic text that includes an extract from a classified KGB document. The cipher on one side of Sanborn's 1997 sculpture Antipodes repeats part of the text from Kryptos with slight differences.

== In popular culture ==
The dust jacket of the US version of Dan Brown's 2003 novel The Da Vinci Code contains two references to Kryptos—one on the back cover (coordinates printed light red on dark red, vertically next to the blurbs) is a reference to the coordinates mentioned in the plaintext of passage 2, except the degree digit is off by one. When Brown and his publisher were asked about this, they both gave the same reply: "The discrepancy is intentional". The coordinates were part of the first clue of the second The Da Vinci Code WebQuests, with the first answer being Kryptos. The other reference is hidden in the brown "tear" artwork—the upside-down text "Only WW knows" is another reference to the second message on Kryptos. Kryptos was also featured in another of Dan Brown's novels, The Lost Symbol (2009).

A small version of Kryptos appears in the season 5 episode of Alias "S.O.S.". In it, Marshall Flinkman says he has cracked the code just by looking at it during a tour visit to the CIA office. The solution he describes sounds like the solution to the first two parts. It was also mentioned as "Kryptos Donuts" in the sixth episode of The Recruit's Season 1, "I.N.A.S.I.A.L.".

== See also ==
- Copiale cipher
- History of cryptography
- Voynich manuscript
