= Brant Hansen =

American radio personality and author (born 1969)

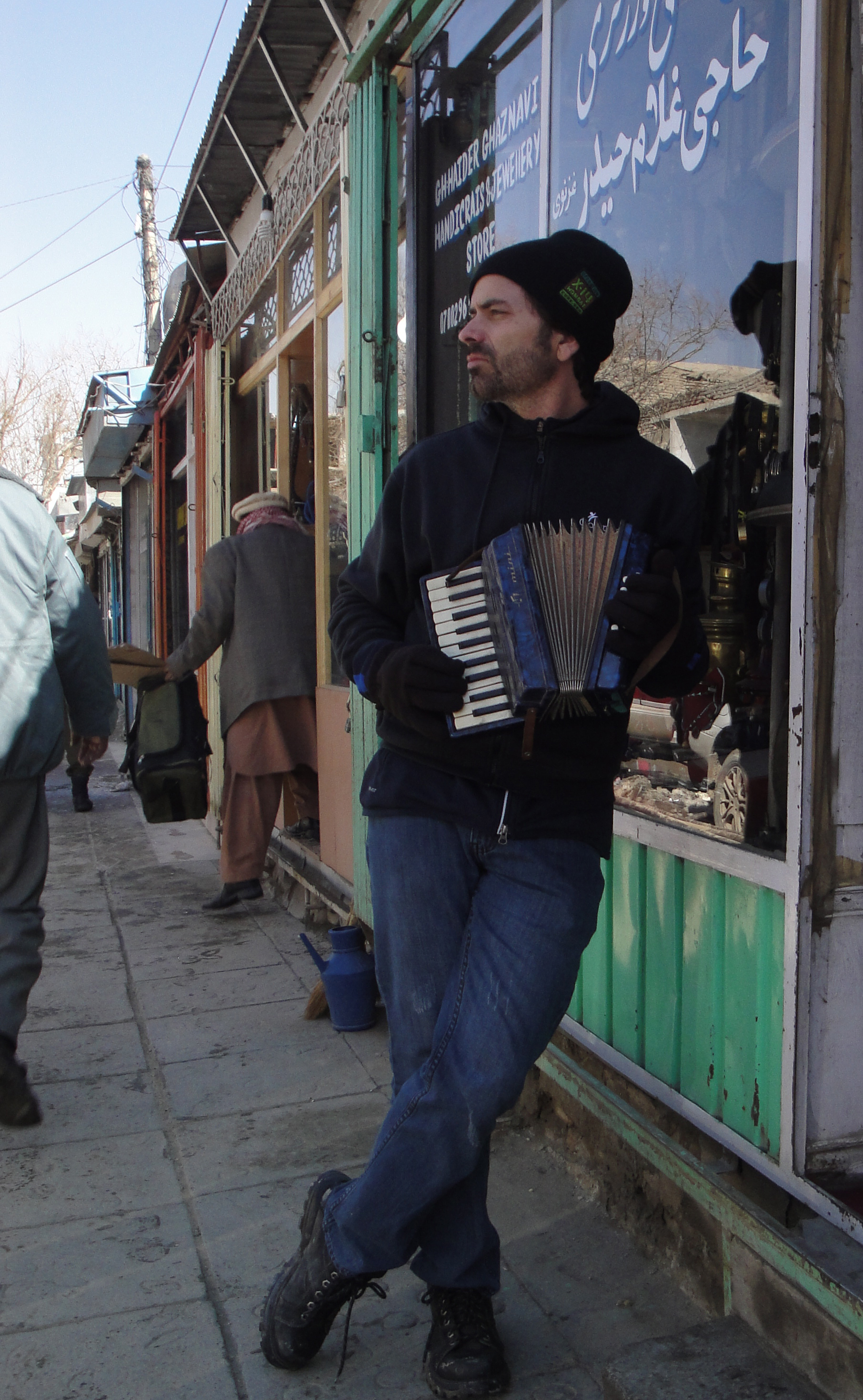
- Brant Hansen with an accordion on Chicken Street in Kabul Afghanistan in 2012
- Born: October 11, 1969 (age 56); Assumption, Illinois
- Education: University of Illinois
- Occupations: Radio host, author
- Website: branthansen.com

Brant Page Hansen (born October 11, 1969) is an American radio personality and author. He has hosted the morning show on the national Christian radio WAY-FM Network and the afternoon show on the national Christian radio network Air1. He has a nationally syndicated radio show carried on over 200 stations in the United States, and is the storyteller for CURE International, a network of charity hospitals and clinics in 30 countries.

== Career ==
=== Radio career ===
Hansen graduated from the University of Illinois school of journalism in 1991. Hansen began his radio career while at the college rock station WPGU. Hansen moved on to be the morning show host for contemporary Christian WBGL-FM in Champaign, Illinois, then moved to Houston, Texas and worked at 89.3FM KSBJ. He was the news director and also an on-air personality. By 2001, Hansen had moved back to Champaign, and was host of The Brant Hansen Show on WDWS 1400 talk radio.

Hansen was the lead singer for the 90s Christian indie band Farewell to Juliet, which released albums including Echoes of Laughter in 1993 and Grace and Dire Circumstances in 1998.

After leaving WDWS, Hansen moved to south Florida in 2003 and joined WAY-FM, where he spent eight years as host of Mornings with Brant. During his time at WAY, he won the Radio and Records Achievement Award for "Personality of the Year" in a Christian format, also winning a Radio Echo Award for "Personality of the Year" from Christian Music Broadcasters in 2008. Hansen also partnered with several international ministries for radio promotions, including Compassion International, World Vision and CURE International. In 2009 and again in 2010, Hansen travelled to Kabul, Afghanistan promoting surgeries performed at the CURE International hospital there. On June 29, 2011, he ended an eight-year run of Mornings With Brant, nationally syndicated by WAY-FM.

Hansen became the afternoon show host for the Air1 radio network on July 19, 2011. Hansen again won the Radio Echo Award for "Personality of the Year" from Christian Music Broadcasters in 2011. During his three years with Air1, he continued his partnership with CURE International, traveling to Afghanistan for a third time in February 2012. In the fall of 2012 and spring of 2013, Air1 partnered with CURE International and BEC Recordings for the "Club Awesome Tour", hosted by Hansen. Each night featured a dance party including Christian artists KJ-52, Manafest and 7eventh Time Down.

In July 2014, Hansen resigned from Air1. His last show aired on Monday, July 7, 2014. In the first independent podcast, he said that he was "in between jobs." The day after his last broadcast on Air1, Hansen's Air1 podcast landed on the US iTunes top 100 podcasts list for the first time, at #74.

In July 2014, he joined the staff of CURE International as "storyteller". He had worked extensively with the charitable organization in the past, helping raise money to provide surgeries for children with treatable conditions. On October 20, 2014, Hansen launched The Brant Hansen Show, a national radio show sponsored by CURE International, and syndicated by Christian FM. As of November 2015, The Brant Hansen Show is syndicated in 32 states, on over 200 radio stations including WAY-FM, Word FM, Shine FM, Liberty University's The Journey FM, and NGEN Radio.

== Publications ==
- Unoffendable: How Just One Change Can Make All of Life Better (Nashville, TN: W Publishing Group, 2014)
- Blessed Are the Misfits: Great News for Believers who are Introverts, Spiritual Strugglers, or Just Feel Like They're Missing Something (Nashville, TN: W Publishing Group, 2017)
- The Truth about Us: The Very Good News about How Very Bad We Are (Grand Rapids, MI: Baker Books, 2020)
- The Men We Need: God's Purpose for the Manly Man, the Avid Indoorsman, or any Man Willing to Show Up (Grand Rapids, MI: Baker Books, 2022)

== Personal life ==
Hansen is a Christian and has been featured on the I Am Second website. He has blogged on multiple sites and maintains a faith-related blog.

Hansen has Asperger syndrome and nystagmus, conditions that have presented him with challenges in social situations. He has stated that he finds these conditions exhausting, but also finds positive aspects to his circumstances. In an interview, he stated, "Let's face it: I'm in radio because I can't be seen. Asperger's makes for real honesty – and that can make arresting radio."

== Awards and nominations ==
=== Radio & Records Industry Achievement Awards ===
Year	Category	Station	Result
2008	Air Personality of the Year (Christian Format)	WAY-FM	Won

=== Christian Music Broadcasters Echo Awards ===
Year	Category	Station	Result
2008	Air Personality of the Year (Markets 26–100)	WAYF/West Palm Beach	Won
2011	Air Personality of the Year (Markets 1-25)	Air1 Radio Network	Won
