= KUHF =

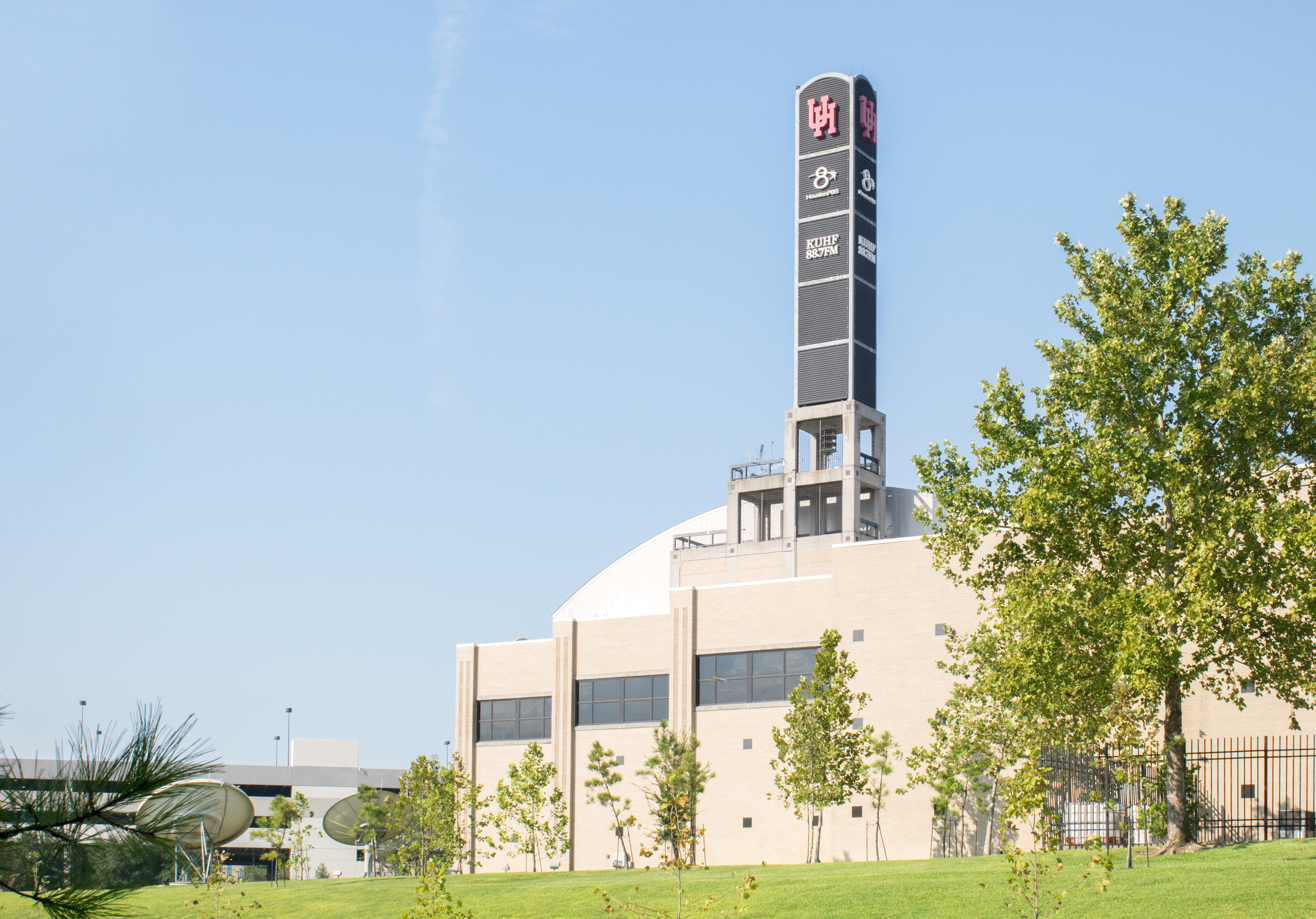
- KUHF's studios at the LeRoy and Lucile Melcher Center for Public Broadcasting
- Houston, Texas; United States
- Broadcast area: Greater Houston
- Frequency: 88.7 MHz (HD Radio)
- Branding: News 88.7

Programming
- Language: English
- Format: Public radio and talk
- Subchannels: HD2: Classical 24; HD3: The Vibe; HD4: Sight into Sound (also on 67 kHz SCA)
- Affiliations: NPR, APM, PRX

Ownership
- Owner: University of Houston; (University of Houston System)
- Sister stations: KUHT

History
- First air date: November 6, 1950
- Former frequencies: 91.3 MHz (1950–1970)
- Call sign meaning: University of Houston FM Radio

Technical information
- Licensing authority: FCC
- Facility ID: 69150
- Class: C
- ERP: 100,000 watts
- HAAT: 524 meters (1,719 ft)
- Transmitter coordinates: 29°34′27″N 95°29′37″W

Links
- Public license information: Public file; LMS
- Webcast: Listen live
- Website: houstonpublicmedia.org

KUHF (88.7 FM, "News 88.7") is a noncommercial radio station licensed to Houston, Texas, United States, and serving Greater Houston. The station is owned by and licensed to the University of Houston System, and is operated by Houston Public Media, also known as Houston Public Radio. KUHF is housed in the LeRoy and Lucile Melcher Center for Public Broadcasting, along with PBS member KUHT (channel 8), on the campus of the University of Houston on Elgin Street. Local productions include The Engines of Our Ingenuity, Houston Matters, Town Square, and Next Question.

== History ==
KUHF first began airing programs on November 6, 1950, at the 91.3 Megahertz frequency. The studios were located in the Ezekiel W. Cullen Building on the University of Houston campus. KUHT co-located with KUHF when the television station debuted in 1953. Broadcasting at 9,600 watts, the station was operated by student volunteers. In 1964, KUHF and KUHT moved to the former KNUZ-TV studios that were vacated by KTRK-TV a few years earlier. This studio would host both stations for the next 35 years, until the move across campus to the current Melcher Center for Public Broadcasting in 2000. The station increased its signal strength to 12,000 watts in 1969.

In 1970, the station began the new decade by switching frequencies to 88.7 Megahertz, in order to reduce interference with KLYX (now KMJQ). The station finally began broadcasting at 100,000 watts in 1979, after receiving a grant from the Corporation for Public Broadcasting. This grant also allowed the station to hire a professional staff, as well as become a National Public Radio member station. KPFT granted a request to relinquish its right to KUHF, to broadcast NPR content.

Between 1979 and March 1986, KUHF's format was NPR news and jazz. In March 1986, local commercial classical music station KLEF changed its format and donated its 12,000+ disc library of music to KUHF, with the proviso that the University of Houston commit KUHF to a format that served Houston's classical music audience, recently disenfranchised by the loss of KLEF. The broadcasting of classical music was explained by citing that the charter of KUHF was to provide music unavailable, otherwise, to Houston. KUHF began airing classical music during the day and late night jazz from 10 pm to 5 am, with NPR news in the morning and afternoon drive time hours. During the summer, former KLEF Operations Manager John Proffitt was hired as the new general manager for KUHF, and he arrived at his new position on August 3. After the next on-air fundraiser in October, which was aimed at NPR, classical and jazz listeners, KUHF eliminated its remaining jazz broadcasting. KUHF GM Proffitt defended eliminating several genres of jazz from Houston radio on the basis that the number of daytime classical listeners far exceeded the overnight number of jazz listeners.

On August 21, 2000, KUHF moved to its current studios in the LeRoy and Lucile Melcher Center for Public Broadcasting on the campus of the University of Houston, where KUHF shares broadcast facilities with public television station KUHT – both owned by and licensed to the University of Houston System – where the complex is located. The previous facility is now in use by the university's Texas Learning and Computation Center.

Until the 2011 creation of all-classical sister station KUHA (see below), the format on FM 88.7 consisted primarily of classical music and news programming from National Public Radio and American Public Media. Since May 2011, 88.7 is exclusively devoted to news and public affairs; to this end, programs such as Fresh Air, Talk of the Nation and The Diane Rehm Show were added to the regular daytime schedule. In addition, KUHF airs many public radio staples, such as Car Talk and A Prairie Home Companion.

In September 2006, to accommodate the growing demand for an all-NPR news and information service, KUHF began broadcasting in HD Radio offering three channels of digital programming in addition to the analog FM: HD channel one offered the same programming as was heard on FM, while HD channel two was a "mirror" of FM/HD-1 by offering classical music during times the other channel played news and informational programming, and vice versa. In this fashion, KUHF HD listeners could receive either NPR news/information or classical music any time of day or night, 24/7. Since KUHA's shutdown in July 2016, KUHF 88.7FM and HD-1 feature NPR news/information exclusively, 24 hours a day, and HD-2 features classical music (exclusively from Classical 24 since 7 November 2013). The HD-2 channel was a simulcast of KUHA from May 2011 until May 2016, when the simulcast broke off in preparation of the sale to the KSBJ Educational Foundation. KUHA began airing delayed repeats of 88.7 HD-2's programming several hours or days after it had aired on 88.7 HD-2. HD Channel 3 carries a mixture of XPoNential Radio, an Adult album alternative station provided by Philadelphia-based public radio station WXPN, and the BBC World Service.

=== Conversion to all-news ===
On August 17, 2010, the University of Houston System announced its intent to purchase the broadcast tower, FM frequency and license of KTRU (91.7 FM) from Rice University. UH then moved all of KUHF's classical music programming to the 91.7 frequency under the call letters KUHA, allowing KUHF to become a full-time NPR news and talk station. (It was originally announced as KUHC; however, those call letters were already in use). The FCC approved the purchase and transfer of license to the University of Houston System on April 15, 2011. (KTRU programming was transferred to a digital subchannel of local Pacifica Radio member station KPFT, and continues under the name Rice Radio.) The new split programming began on May 16, 2011. Non-news entertainment programming, such as Snap Judgment, A Prairie Home Companion and the radio version of America's Test Kitchen, airs on weekends.

Due to a fundraising shortfall, KUHA fired almost all of its on-air talent on 7 November 2013 and replaced nearly all of its locally produced programming with Public Radio International's Classical 24, a nationally syndicated program produced in Minnesota.

On March 3, 2014, Houston Public Radio's KUHF and KUHA, along with KUHT (previously branded as HoustonPBS), were all rebranded into Houston Public Media.

In August 2015, The University of Houston System announced its intention to sell KUHA and move the classical format to the HD2 subcarrier of KUHF and internet streaming only. KUHT's fifth digital subchannel would also continue to simulcast the format. It was announced the following February that KUHA would be sold to the KSBJ Educational Foundation, who announced plans to change the format of KUHA to Christian hip hop music. KUHA ceased broadcasting classical music on July 14 and started stunting with looped announcements informing listeners of KUHA's demise and the continuation of the format on KUHF-HD2 and other digital platforms. The following morning, on July 15, the sale closed and KUHA (which was subsequently rechristened KXNG and is now KHVU) went dark.
