= KVUD =

Simulcasts KHVU
- Bay City, Texas; United States
- Frequency: 89.5 MHz
- Branding: Vida Unida 91.7

Programming
- Language: Spanish
- Format: Christian adult contemporary

Ownership
- Owner: Hope Media Group; (KSBJ Educational Foundation)
- Sister stations: KHVU, KSBJ, KXBJ, KHIH, KEHH

History
- First air date: August 17, 2005
- Former call signs: KZBJ (2003–2021)
- Call sign meaning: "Vida Unida"

Technical information
- Licensing authority: FCC
- Facility ID: 91535
- Class: C3
- ERP: 13,000 watts
- HAAT: 138.2 meters
- Transmitter coordinates: 28°48′0.00″N 96°7′32.00″W

Links
- Public license information: Public file; LMS
- Website: Vida Unida

KVUD (89.5 FM) is a radio station broadcasting a Spanish Christian adult contemporary music format. Licensed to Bay City, Texas, United States, the station is currently owned by the KSBJ Educational Foundation. KVUD is licensed to use HD Radio, but is not currently broadcasting in HD. Its studios are located in Humble. KVUD's transmission site is located northeast of Palacios in extreme southwestern Matagorda County.

== History ==
KSBJ Educational Foundation was granted a license to cover for the facility on August 17, 2005. It was originally licensed as a Class C2 facility with its broadcast tower in the city limits of Bay City, but downgraded to the current C3 classification, with 13 kilowatts ERP, and moved further southwest in Matagorda County in order to accommodate the move of parent station KSBJ into the Houston city limits.

On August 20, 2021, KZBJ's callsign was changed to KVUD. On September 16, 2021, Hope Media Group announced that NGEN Radio would be moved exclusively to digital distribution on its website and app on November 8, at which point a new, undisclosed format would launch on KHVU, KVUD, and KVUJ. On August 31, 2021, Hope Media Group registered the trademark Vida Unida, presumably the new format for these stations. On November 10, the stations flipped to Spanish Christian adult contemporary "Vida Unida".
