= KBEX =

KBEX may refer to:

- KBEX (FM), a defunct radio station (96.1 FM) licensed to serve Dalhart Texas, held the KBEX calls from 2013 until it went silent in 2021.
- KBEX-LP, a defunct low-power television station (channel 6) formerly licensed to serve Amarillo, Texas; see List of radio stations in Texas
- KUBJ, a radio station (89.7 FM) licensed to serve Brenham Texas, held the KBEX calls from 2005-2008
