= KXIT =

KXIT may refer to:

- KXIT (AM), a radio station (1240 AM) licensed to serve Dalhart, Texas, United States
- KBEX (FM), a radio station (96.3 FM) licensed to serve Dalhart, Texas, which held the call sign KXIT-FM from 2011 to 2013
- KBEX-LP, a defunct low-power television station (channel 6) formerly licensed to serve Amarillo, Texas, which held the call sign KXIT-LP from 2007 to 2013
