= WVOX =

Radio station in New Rochelle, New York, United States

Silent
- New Rochelle, New York; United States
- Broadcast area: New York metropolitan area
- Frequency: 1460 kHz

Ownership
- Owner: Jeff Chang (Sale pending to Authencia and Lizchizedek Manning's Omega Vision Network)

History
- First air date: September 9, 1950
- Former call signs: WGNR (1950–1953); WNRC (1953–1958); WWES (1958–1959)
- Call sign meaning: vox, Latin for voice

Technical information
- Licensing authority: FCC
- Facility ID: 28024
- Class: D
- Power: 500 watts (day); 122 watts (night)
- Transmitter coordinates: 40°55′39.4″N 73°46′28.5″W

Links
- Public license information: Public file; LMS

WVOX (1460 AM) is a radio station licensed to New Rochelle, New York and serving the New York metropolitan area. WVOX is owned by Beverly Hills, California-based Chang Media Group, and has its transmitter located in Mount Vernon, New York.

WVOX is presently silent pending technical and programming changes to be implemented by Chang Media, who acquired WVOX in October 2023 in a three-way donation/sale transaction from its former locally-based owner, Whitney Media Group. Under Whitney ownership, WVOX primarily aired locally-produced information and talk, including programs presented by local citizens and interest groups. The station was affiliated with Music of Your Life, which aired overnights, weekends, and in time slots not occupied by a local show. The station's coverage area includes most of Westchester County and adjoining portions of New York City, along with Nassau County on Long Island and northeastern New Jersey.

Further changes to WVOX's operations was expected to be undertaken by Omega Vision Network, a Christian broadcast ministry which in September 2025 announced it would purchase the station from Chang Media Group, pending final approval from the Federal Communications Commission.

== History ==
=== Early years ===
On April 28, 1949, New Rochelle Broadcasting Service, Inc. filed for a construction permit to build a new radio station at 1460 kHz in New Rochelle. The permit was granted on June 22, 1950, and WGNR began broadcasting on September 9, 1950. WGNR-FM 93.5 had already launched in September 1948.

New Rochelle Broadcasting Service, however, went bankrupt in 1952, signing the station off on August 1. After the appointment of a receiver, Radio New Rochelle, Inc., owned by the Iodice Family, acquired the station and changed the call letters to WNRC on both the AM and FM stations. WNRC returned to the air in October 1953; it retained those call letters through a transfer of control to the Daniels family in 1955.

WNRC became WWES-AM-FM on December 10, 1958, as the station was sold to Radio Westchester for $225,000. The Radio Westchester sale made it a sister station to WVIP in Mount Kisco, serving lower Westchester County. On February 26, 1959, however, the station would change its call sign to WVOX, which remains in use as of January 2024.

=== WVOX ===
WVOX joined a radio operation owned by the New York Herald-Tribune newspaper in the early 1960s. By 1962, after John Hay Whitney bought the Herald-Tribune the year before, the paper's radio division included WVOX-AM-FM, WVIP, WGHQ at Kingston and WFYI (now WJDM) in Mineola. With the Herald-Tribune closed, Whitney Communications sold WVOX-AM-FM and WGHQ-AM-FM in 1968 to Hudson-Westchester Radio in an $800,000 acquisition. Hudson-Westchester was led by William O'Shaughnessy, a former account executive with the Herald-Tribune Radio Network who had been WVOX's general manager since 1965.

WVOX evolved into a community-oriented talk radio station, which by 1973 had a reputation for local color and gossip of Westchester County. That year, it moved out of its former studios to new facilities at the station's transmitter site in New Rochelle, known as One Broadcast Forum. O'Shaughnessy hosted a daily talk show on the station for more than 50 years, featuring interviews with U.S. politicians, authors, and entertainers. The Wall Street Journal described WVOX as the "quintessential community radio station in America". In 2005, O'Shaughnessy was one of the first 25 people to be inducted into the new New York State Broadcasters Hall of Fame by the New York State Broadcasters Association. He was honored for his long record as a champion of free speech under the First Amendment.

The programming of WVOX during the 1970s included local news shows that were dedicated to towns in its coverage area, such as Mount Vernon and Pelham. The call-in show "Open Line", which often exceeded its allotted time slot, was also part of the programming lineup. Ethnic and religious blocks were also featured, along with music when the station didn't have a talk show on the air.

Following his departure from WEVD in 2001, Bill Mazer had an afternoon interview program on WVOX (and streamed from WVOX's website), with his son Arnie as producer. Mazer's last show was aired August 3, 2009, ending his tenure at the station and marking his retirement from broadcasting.

=== Pending donation and subsequent sale ===
Owner William O'Shaughnessy died May 28, 2022, at age 84. On August 25, 2023, O'Shaughnessy's estate announced WVOX and its FM translator would be donated to MMTC Broadcasting, a nonprofit that would then transfer the station's license to Chang Media Group. WVOX's FM sister station WVIP was sold several weeks earlier to Hope Media Group, which converted it to a Spanish-language Christian music format under new WNVU call letters on September 1, 2023.

On September 7, 2023, WVOX ended its local programing and ceased operations ahead of the sale. However, about a week later WVOX returned to the air and simulcasted the music programming of noncommercial WJZZ in Montgomery, New York. Upon the FCC's granting approval of the donation/sale transfer on October 26, 2023, the station went silent once again. Under the terms of the sale, Chang Media Group is required to move WVOX's transmitter and studio facilities to a new location, as the O'Shaughnessy family is retaining One Broadcast Forum; Chang will also install a new programming format.

In September 2025, Jeff Chang sold the station to Lizchizedek and Authencia Manning’s Omega Vision Network for $77,000. Chang purchased WVOX’s license in 2023 for $20,000.

== See also ==
- List of community radio stations in the United States
