= KVRK =

KVRK may refer to:

- KVRK (FM), a radio station (88.3 FM) licensed to serve Chickaloon, Alaska, United States; see List of radio stations in Alaska
- KAWA, a radio station (89.7 FM) licensed to serve Sanger, Texas, United States, which held the call sign KVRK from 2004 to 2015
