= Rhythmic contemporary =

American music radio format

Rhythmic contemporary, also known as Rhythmic Top 20, Rhythmic Top 30, Rhythmic Top 40, Rhythmic CHR or rhythmic crossover, is a primarily American music-radio format that includes a mix of EDM, upbeat rhythmic pop, hip-hop and upbeat R&B hits. Rhythmic contemporary never uses hard rock or country in its airplay, but it may occasionally use a reggae, Latin, reggaeton, or an urban contemporary gospel hit. Essentially, the format is a cross between the mainstream radio and urban contemporary radio formats.

== Format history ==
Although some top-40 stations such as CKLW in Windsor, Ontario, made their mark by integrating a large amount of R&B and soul product into their predominantly pop playlists as early as 1967, such stations were still considered mainstream top 40 (a cycle that continues to dominate the current Top 40/CHR chart). It was not until the disco era of the late 1970s that such stations came to be considered as a format of their own as opposed to top-40 or soul. This development was largely spurred by the highly successful "worst-to-first" debut of the disco-based format on WKTU on 92.3 FM in New York City (now WINS-FM) in 1978. That station was classified as disco but actually played a blend of disco, dance music, and pop crossovers. At that time, stations playing strictly R&B tracks were known as "black" or "soul" stations. Stations such as WKTU came to be known as urban contemporary in the early 1980s as the disco era ended. In the 1980s, many urban contemporary stations began to spring up. Most of these leaned more towards R&B than dance music. These urban stations began sounding identical to so-called black stations and by 1985, stations that played strictly R&B product were all known as urban stations. Still, some urban outlets continued adding artists from outside the format onto their playlist. In most cases it was dance and rhythmic pop but in other cases they added a few rock songs. For example, Detroit's successful WDRQ included artists such as Cyndi Lauper, Culture Club and The Romantics in its urban format circa 1984.

But it wasn't until January 11, 1986, that KPWR in Los Angeles, a former struggling adult contemporary outlet, began to make its mark with this genre by adopting this approach. It would be known as crossover because of the musical mix and the avoidance of most rock at the time. Shortly afterward WQHT in New York adopted a similar crossover format and enjoyed similar ratings success. The new breed of crossover stations broke a number of popular artists, including Expose and The Cover Girls, but such artists couldn't reach the top of either the Billboard Hot 100 or Hot Black Singles charts because their airplay was split between a handful of mainstream top-40 and black reporting stations. Billboard magazine thus debuted its first rhythmic top-40 airplay chart, the "Hot Crossover 30," in its February 28, 1987, issue. The Crossover panel's initial lineup of 18 stations included five exclusive Crossover reporters (KPWR, WQHT, WHQT Miami, WMYK Norfolk, and WOCQ Ocean City, MD) as well as 13 stations which also retained their prior CHR or black reporter status (among them WPOW Miami, WHRK Memphis, KMEL San Francisco, WHYT Detroit, WQUE New Orleans, WLUM Milwaukee. and XHRM Tijuana/San Diego). This was the first rhythmic top-40 airplay chart in any radio/records trade magazine. The chart's first number one song was "Lean on Me" by Club Nouveau.

Today, Mega 97ONE in Santa Maria broadcasts such a format.

For years since its inception, the rhythmic name has been a source of confusion among music trades, especially in both Billboard (which used the Rhythmic Top 40 title) and Radio & Records (which use the CHR/rhythmic title for their official charts). In August 2006 Billboard dropped both the "top 40" and "CHR" name from the rhythmic title after its sister publication Billboard Radio Monitor merged with Radio & Records to become the "New" R&R as part of their realignment of format categories. The move also ended confusion among the radio stations who report to their panels, which was modified by the end of 2006 with the inclusion of non-monitored reporters that were holdovers from the "(Old) R&R" days.

Still, over the years since its inception, the genre has grown and evolved in its position between traditional R&B outlets (who claim that the Rhythmic contemporary format does not target or serve the African-American community properly) and the traditional Top 40 hit stations. However, both R&B and mainstream top 40 outlets have taken cues from the Rhythmic contemporary format through the years; as of 2018, the cycle continues to dominate the current Top 40/CHR playlist as more Rhythmic and EDM songs are making their way onto the Mainstream chart.

An offshoot format of rhythmic contemporary is rhythmic adult contemporary, which targets an adult audience with a mix of current rhythmic hits and gold tracks (often termed "Throwbacks") which may date as far back as the 1980s or even the disco era of the 1970s. As with Rhythmic CHR, Rhythmic AC may vary depending on the market as to how much hip-hop and R&B product are included in the playlist; for example, the current WKTU (one of the late 1990s pioneers of the recent crop of Rhythmic AC stations) leans toward pop and dance, while WBQT in Boston is very hip-hop heavy. Internet-only station KVPN Digital 1 in San Francisco is an example of a Rhythmic AC that leans urban with a mix of r&b and deep soulful house vocals, known as an "Urban Chill" format.

Another offshoot is Christian rhythmic contemporary, which features Christian orientated Rhythmic music from such artists as KB, Wande, Tedashii, NF, Lecrae, Jor'Dan Armstrong, Social Club Misfits, and Tori Kelly. Leading radio stations that are Christian rhythmic or have a rhythmic lean include KXBS (Boost Radio) in St. Louis; WYSZ (Yes FM) in Toledo, Ohio; WHMX (Solution FM) in Bangor, Maine; KPUL (Pulse 101.7) in Des Moines, Iowa; and KOAY (Project 88.7) in Boise, Idaho; and Hope Media Group's online station NGEN Radio.

== See also ==
- Rhythmic (chart)
