= KAMT (FM) =

Channing, Texas; United States
- Broadcast area: Amarillo, Texas
- Frequency: 105.1 MHz
- Branding: "Blazin 105"

Programming
- Format: Tejano

Ownership
- Owner: Maria Ceniceros; (Viva Media, L.L.C.)
- Sister stations: KBEX, KQFX

History
- First air date: 2013
- Former call signs: KCNG
- Call sign meaning: Random assignment

Technical information
- Licensing authority: FCC
- Class: C2
- ERP: 33,000 watts
- HAAT: 180 meters (590 ft)
- Transmitter coordinates: 33.739722°N 102.248889°W

Links
- Public license information: Public file; LMS

KAMT (105.1 FM; "Blazin 105") is a Tejano formatted radio station serving Channing, Texas, and Amarillo, Texas. The station is owned by Maria Ceniceros, through licensee Viva Media, LLC. Its transmitter is located south of Channing.

As of April 15, 2017 at 10 p.m., the station was playing country music while stunting. On April 28, 2017, the station was re-branded Blazin 105, Tejano and More. Less than 60 days later, ownership made the decision to switch back to Regional Mexican, leaving staff unaware and unpaid. Previous formats included Spanish Pop and Regional Mexican.
