= KTRU =

Radio station in La Harpe, Kansas

- La Harpe, Kansas; United States
- Broadcast area: Iola, Kansas
- Frequency: 91.9 MHz

Programming
- Language: English
- Format: Christian Contemporary

Ownership
- Owner: St. Macrina Media and Education Society

History
- First air date: 2011
- Former call signs: KFKB (2009–2011)

Technical information
- Licensing authority: FCC
- Facility ID: 174471
- Class: A
- ERP: 750 watts
- HAAT: 66.2 meters (217 ft)
- Transmitter coordinates: 37°57′24.1″N 95°22′15.7″W
- Translators: K253BF (98.5 MHz, Chanute)

Links
- Public license information: Public file; LMS

KTRU (91.9 FM) is an American non-commercial educational radio station licensed to serve the community of La Harpe, Kansas. Established in 2011, this station's broadcast license is held by the St. Macrina Media and Education Society.

== History ==
In October 2007, Grace Public Radio applied to the Federal Communications Commission (FCC) for a construction permit for a new broadcast radio station to serve Girard, Kansas. The FCC granted this permit on October 8, 2008, with a scheduled expiration date of October 8, 2011. The new station was assigned call sign "KFKB" on January 1, 2009.

In August 2010, with the station still under construction, the permit holder applied to change the new station's city of license from Girard to La Harpe, Kansas. The FCC issued a new permit to make this change on April 5, 2011, with a scheduled expiration of October 8, 2011. The station applied for, and was assigned, new call sign "KTRU" by the FCC on May 17, 2011. After construction and testing were completed in October 2011, the station was granted its broadcast license on October 28, 2011. KTRU went silent on September 27, 2018, as Grace prepared to sell the station. Grace then sold the station to the St. Macrina Media and Education Society for $32,000. KTRU returned to the air on September 1, 2019.

The KTRU call letters had previously been associated with the radio station at Rice University in Houston, which had them from its FM debut in 1971 until Rice sold the license in 2011. When Rice got a low-power FM facility in 2015, it adopted the KBLT-LP call letters. With KTRU under St. Macrina ownership, Rice was able to purchase from the right to change KBLT-LP to KTRU-LP in August 2019 for $10,000.

== Programming ==
Under Grace Public Radio, KTRU broadcast a Contemporary Christian format to the greater Iola, Kansas area.
