= KEHH =

KSBJ radio station in Livingston, Texas

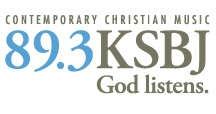
- Livingston, Texas; United States
- Broadcast area: Livingston, Texas; Huntsville, Texas; Lufkin, Texas
- Frequency: 92.3 MHz
- Branding: 89.3 KSBJ

Programming
- Format: Christian adult contemporary
- Affiliations: KSBJ Radio Network

Ownership
- Owner: Hope Media Group
- Sister stations: KSBJ, KXBJ, KWUP, KHVU, KHIH, WNVU, WAY-FM Network

History
- First air date: October 19, 1970 (as KETX-FM at 92.1)
- Former call signs: KETX-FM (October 19, 1970- October 15, 2019)
- Former frequencies: 92.1 MHz (1970–1992)

Technical information
- Licensing authority: FCC
- Facility ID: 52897
- Class: C2
- ERP: 32,000 watts
- HAAT: 185 meters (607 ft)
- Transmitter coordinates: 30°44′18″N 94°55′26″W

Links
- Public license information: Public file; LMS
- Webcast: Listen Live
- Website: www.ksbj.org

KEHH (92.3 FM; 89.3 KSBJ) is a terrestrial American radio station broadcasting a Christian adult contemporary format in full pentacast with sister stations KSBJ Humble, KWUP Navasota, KHIH Liberty, and KXBJ El Campo. Licensed to Livingston, Texas, United States, the station serves the areas of Livingston, Huntsville, and Lufkin, Texas. The station is currently owned by Hope Media Group (formerly KSBJ Educational Foundation).

== History ==
KEHH was the longtime FM sister station to Polk County Broadcasting Company's 1440 KETX, owned by Harold J. Haley, Sr.

Originally proposed to operate from the 1440 KETX tower site, 0.8 miles NNE of Livingston on U.S. Highway 59 in September 1969, Haley was granted a License to Cover the new FM facility by the Federal Communications Commission, operating at 3 kilowatts of power, on frequency channel 221 (92.1 MHz), as KETX-FM, elevated at 145 meters height above average terrain, on October 19, 1970. Donald L. Gulihur was the Chief Engineer for the facility's construction.

KETX-FM would increase power to the current 32 kilowatts ERP, elevated at 185 meters height above average terrain, which included moving one operating channel up to the current 222 (92.3 MHz) on September 16, 1992.

KETX-FM and KETX were owned by Polk County Broadcasting Company until October 8, 2008, when the two facilities, plus the low power television station, were sold to Livingston Telephone, under the subsidiary Telcom Supply, Inc., after the deaths of Hal Sr. & wife Peggy Haley.

The KETX trio of facilities were locally owned and operated until KSBJ purchased this station in July 2019. KETX was next sold by Livingston Telephone to Ken Luck on October 2, 2019, who proceeded to flip the AM, and its newly licensed FM translator, to this facility's former Classic Rock format as "102.3 The Eagle".

KETX-FM changed from its longtime callset to the current KEHH on October 15, 2019.

KETX-LP remains the sole facility still owned and operated by the Livingston Telephone Company's subsidiary, Telcom Supply.
