= KQFX =

KQFX may refer to:

- KQFX (FM), a radio station (104.3 FM) licensed to serve Borger, Texas, United States
- KQFX-LD, a low-power television station (channel 30, virtual 22) licensed to serve Columbia, Missouri, United States
