= WAYG =

WAYG may refer to:

- WAYG-LP, a low-power radio station (104.7 FM) licensed to serve Miami, Florida, United States
- WAYI, a radio station (104.3 FM) licensed to serve Charlestown, Indiana, United States, which held the call sign WAYG in 2014
- WNHG, a radio station (89.7 FM) licensed to serve Grand Rapids, Michigan, United States, which held the call sign WAYG from 1998 to 2013
- WSMR (FM), a radio station (89.1 FM) licensed to serve Sarasota, Florida, which held the call sign WAYG from 1991 to 1996
