= KUHT =

Television station in Houston

- Houston, Texas; United States
- Channels: Digital: 8 (VHF); Virtual: 8
- Branding: Houston Public Media PBS

Programming
- Affiliations: 8.1: PBS; for others, see § Subchannels

Ownership
- Owner: University of Houston; (University of Houston System)
- Sister stations: Radio: KUHF

History
- First air date: May 25, 1953
- Former channel numbers: Analog: 8 (VHF, 1953–2009); Digital: 9 (VHF, 2001–2009)
- Former affiliations: NET (1953–1970)
- Call sign meaning: University of Houston Television

Technical information
- Licensing authority: FCC
- Facility ID: 69269
- ERP: 64.6 kW
- HAAT: 566 m (1,857 ft)
- Transmitter coordinates: 29°34′29″N 95°29′38″W

Links
- Public license information: Public file; LMS
- Website: www.houstonpublicmedia.org

KUHT (channel 8) is a PBS member television station in Houston, Texas, United States. Owned by the University of Houston System, it is sister to NPR member station KUHF (88.7 FM). The two stations share studios and offices in the LeRoy and Lucile Melcher Center for Public Broadcasting on the campus of the University of Houston on Elgin Street; KUHT's transmitter is located near Missouri City, in unincorporated northeastern Fort Bend County. In addition, the station leased some of its studio operations to Tegna-owned CBS affiliate KHOU (channel 11) from August 2017 to February 2019, when the latter's original studios were inundated by Hurricane Harvey.

KUHT also serves as the default PBS member station to the neighboring Beaumont–Port Arthur and Victoria markets (the latter along with KLRN in San Antonio) as they do not have their own PBS station. It is available on cable and satellite providers in both markets, although Lake Charles member station and Louisiana Public Broadcasting outlet KLTL-TV is carried by some cable providers in the extreme eastern areas of the Beaumont–Port Arthur market.

KUHT is notable as the first public television station in the United States.

== History ==
=== Early history ===
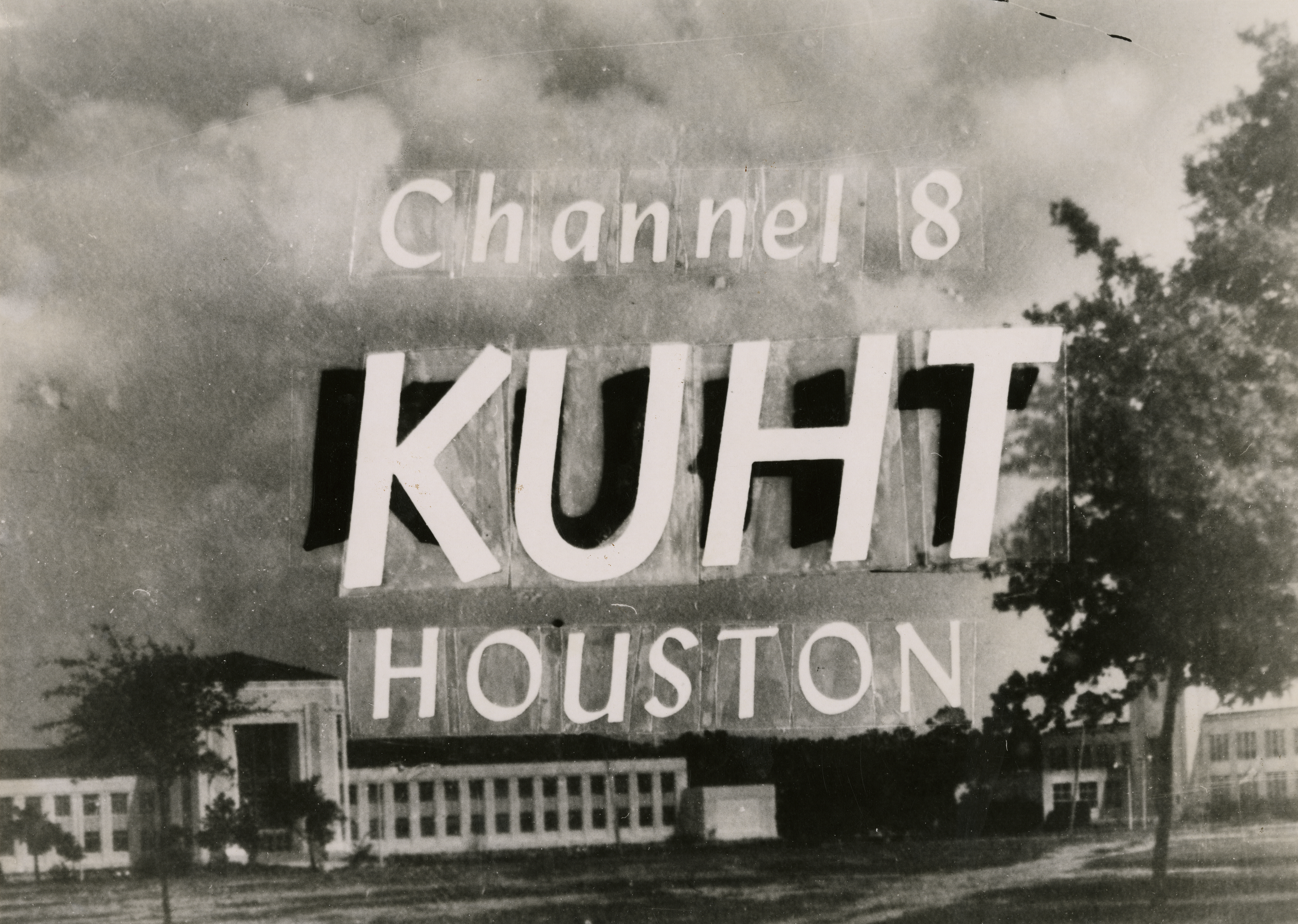
An early station identification.

The station was established by Dr. John C. Schwarzwalder, a professor in the Radio-Television Department at the University of Houston (UH), and Dr. John W. Meaney, an English professor at UH, and was first signed on the air on May 25, 1953, as the first station to broadcast under an educational non-profit license in the United States, and one of the earliest member stations of National Educational Television, which was succeeded by PBS. KUHT, co-located with FM station KUHF, originally operated from the Ezekiel W. Cullen Building on the UH campus. Its dedication ceremonies were broadcast on June 8 of that year. The station's initial cost was an investment of $350,000, and had an annual operating budget of about $110,000. Originally licensed to both UH and the Houston Independent School District, UH became its sole licensee in 1959.

The station also offered the university's first televised college credit classes. Running 13 to 15 hours weekly, these telecasts accounted for 38 percent of the program schedule. Most courses aired at night so that students who worked during the day could watch them. By the mid-1960s, with about one-third of the station's programming devoted to educational programming, more than 100,000 semester hours had been taught on KUHT.

In 1964, KUHT and KUHF moved into new studio facilities in the defunct Texas Television Center located on Cullen Boulevard, which were previously occupied by DuMont Television Network affiliate KNUZ-TV. When KNUZ-TV went dark, ABC affiliate (now owned-and-operated station) KTRK-TV (channel 13) used the facility from KTRK's inception in 1954, until it moved to its current studios on Bissonnet Street in 1961. This studio would host both stations for the next 35 years, until the move across campus to the current Melcher Center for Public Broadcasting in 2000. KUHT purchased a new transmitter that not only enabled the station to broadcast beyond Harris County into its surrounding areas, but also to begin broadcasting in color. Five years later, in 1969, the Association for Community Television was formed to fund KUHT.

=== PBS era ===
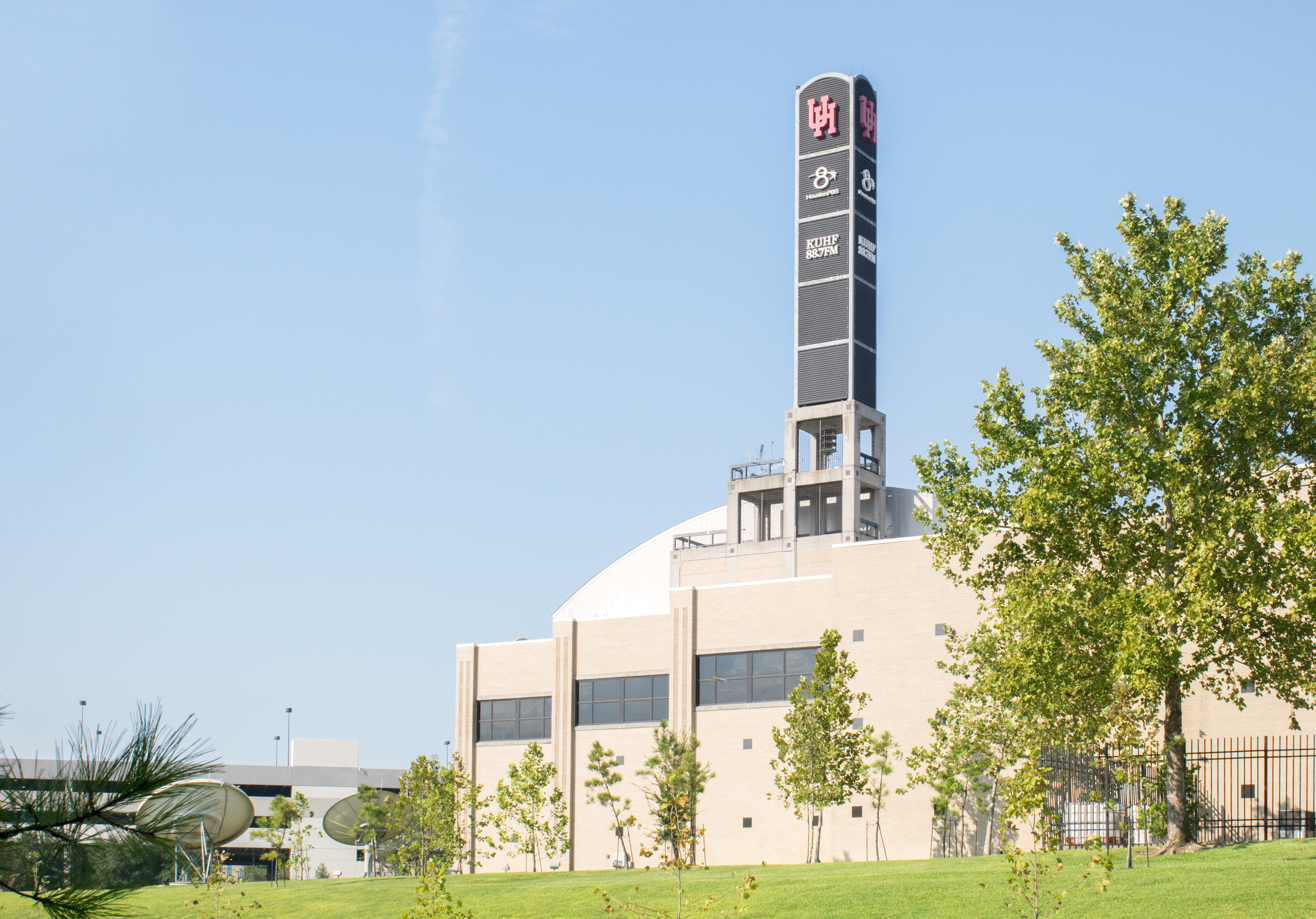
The LeRoy and Lucile Melcher Center for Public Broadcasting where KUHT is housed.

In 1970, the Public Broadcasting Service (PBS), the successor network to National Educational Television, began service, combining televised educational lectures with popular programs such as Sesame Street, NOVA and Masterpiece Theatre that remain PBS staples to this day. The station is also noted in Houston for many technical firsts at the local level. In 1981, KUHT became Houston's first television station to provide closed captioning, and 10 years later, in 1991, it became the first station in Houston to offer Descriptive Video Service audio, and other services for the visually impaired as well as bilingual viewers via a secondary audio program feed.

In 1982, with assistance from KTRK and then-independent station KRIV (channel 26, now a Fox owned-and-operated station), KUHT began operating a new transmitter located near Missouri City – making it one of several television and radio stations that now broadcast from that location. KUHT was known on-air as "Houston Public Television" for many years before adopting the "HoustonPBS" moniker in the early 21st century. From 1993 into the early 2000s, KUHT's logo also did not include the number 8, but used a logo similar to the ones used by Detroit's WTVS and Seattle's KCTS-TV. These stations are members of Lark International, a public television production company, which owns the sunburst-on-square logo; however, they are not related to each other. KUHT's logo during this era was based on the sunburst portion of that logo.

On August 21, 2000, KUHT moved to its current studios in the LeRoy and Lucile Melcher Center for Public Broadcasting on the UH campus, where KUHT shares broadcast facilities with public radio station KUHF—both owned by and licensed to the UH System—where the complex is located. The previous facility is now in use by the university's Texas Learning and Computation Center.

On March 3, 2014, KUHT, along with KUHF and 91.7 KUHA (owned by the university at the time, now Hope Media Group-owned KHVU), were all rebranded into Houston Public Media. The station dropped the "HoustonPBS" name to assume the new name.

In late-August 2017, Tegna-owned CBS affiliate KHOU (channel 11) temporarily moved its news and broadcasting operations to Melcher Center. KHOU's Neartown facility had suffered catastrophic flooding during Hurricane Harvey. On November 16, 2017, KHOU announced it would not return to its former studios; the building would be subsequently demolished in May 2018. The station remained at the Melcher Center until their new facility at 5718 Westheimer Road near Uptown Houston was completed in February 2019.

== Film library ==
KUHT has an archive of almost 600 film reels—some more than 50 years old, along with 5,000 videocassettes—some dating back more than 30 years. However, the archive material is in various states of deterioration, with some films and cassettes already suffering from vinegar syndrome. In September 2010, the Texas State Library and Archives Commission granted the University of Houston $25,000 for film preservation; however, the funding is only enough to transfer 25 films to digital format, with films related to Texas taking top priority.

== Original productions ==
KUHT has produced the following original national productions for PBS:

- Cucina Sicilia (2003–2004) – West 175 Productions
- InnerVIEWS with Ernie Manouse
- Mary Lou's Flip Flop Shop
- Space Station (1999)
- The Story of Jesse H. Jones (2000)
- Weeknight Edition

== Technical information ==
=== Subchannels ===
The station's signal is multiplexed:

Subchannels of KUHT
Subchannel	Res.	Short name	Programming
8.1	1080i	KUHT-HD	PBS
8.2	480i	KUHT8.2	Create
8.3	480i	KUHT8.3	PBS Kids
8.4	480i	KUHT8.4	NHK World
8.5	Audio only	KUHT8.5	Sight into Sound
8.6	480i	KUHT8.6	World Channel
39.3	480i	TheNest	The Nest (KIAH)

Broadcast on behalf of another station

=== Analog-to-digital conversion ===
KUHT's digital signal originally began broadcasting on VHF channel 9 on May 12, 2001. The station ended regular programming on its analog signal, over VHF channel 8, on June 12, 2009, as part of the federally mandated transition from analog to digital television. The station's digital signal relocated from its pre-transition VHF channel 9 to channel 8 for post-transition operations.

In 2009, KUHT filed with the FCC for construction permits to build low-powered digital transmitters in Beaumont (K24KQ, channel 24) and Victoria (K29JI-D, channel 29), in order to provide over-the-air PBS service to both cities. Those two construction permits have expired and KUHT has no plans to attempt the build-outs at this time (2015).
