= KCHN =

- Brookshire, Texas; United States
- Broadcast area: Greater Houston
- Frequency: 1050 kHz

Programming
- Format: South Asian

Ownership
- Owner: Multicultural Broadcasting; (Multicultural Radio Broadcasting Licensee, LLC)

History
- First air date: August 2, 1968
- Former call signs: KPXE (1968–1997)
- Call sign meaning: Chinese

Technical information
- Licensing authority: FCC
- Facility ID: 68124
- Class: D
- Power: 410 watts (days only)
- Transmitter coordinates: 29°52′45″N 96°2′8″W

Links
- Public license information: Public file; LMS
- Website: kchnradio.com/3.html

KCHN (1050 AM) is a radio station licensed to Brookshire, Texas, United States, and serving Greater Houston. Owned by Multicultural Broadcasting, it serves mostly Asian listeners with broadcasts in a mix of Indian, Chinese, Mandarin, Vietnamese and Pakistani languages. Sports programming includes coverage of Houston Rockets games. The station also provides religious programs in Polish.

== History ==
Originally licensed to Liberty, Texas in 1967 as KPXE. In 1990, Trinity River Valley Broadcasting built an FM facility and started on (the current KHIH) as of August 29, 1991, the 24 hour FM sister to KPXE. KPXE was sold to Arthur Liu in 1997, which included the move of the facility to Brookshire, as a station targeting the southwestern and western areas of Houston, which have a significant Asian populace.

Because KCHN shares the same frequency as "clear channel" station XEG-AM in Monterrey, Nuevo León, Mexico; it broadcasts only during the daytime hours.

Kalakkal Kadambam, Kannada Karunji, Andhra Mirchi, and Tamil Mirchi programs are aired from KCHN on Saturdays.

Texas Chinese Radio (德州中文台) program is aired from KCHN on Monday through Friday from 7a.m. to 12p.m.

Texas Chinese Radio (德州中文台) moved from KCHN to its sister station KXYZ in 2017 and on knth?
