= KTRU-LP =

Radio station at Rice University in Houston

Coordinates: 29.7163°N 95.4083°W

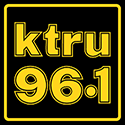
- Houston, Texas; United States
- Broadcast area: Greater Houston
- Frequency: 96.1 MHz
- Branding: ktru 96.1fm

Programming
- Language: English
- Format: Freeform and college radio

Ownership
- Owner: Rice University; (William Marsh Rice University)

History
- Founded: 1967
- First air date: October 2, 2015
- Former call signs: KBLT-LP (2015–2019)
- Call sign meaning: Texas Rice University

Technical information
- Licensing authority: FCC
- Facility ID: 174471
- ERP: 41 watts
- HAAT: 47 meters (154 ft)

Links
- Public license information: LMS
- Webcast: Listen live
- Website: ktru.org

KTRU-LP (96.1 FM, stylized as "ktru") is the college radio station of Rice University, a private university in south-central Houston, Texas, United States.

KTRU-LP broadcasts a freeform-eclectic music format on 96.1 FM; its programming includes modern classical, reggae, indie rock, chopped and screwed, spoken word and local experimental noise bands. During evening hours, the station broadcasts shows geared to particular musical genres and themes. The station is owned by the university, which maintains an FM transmitter atop Rice Stadium, and is managed by its students.

The current KTRU-LP license dates to 2015. However, Rice's first foray into FM radio began in 1971, and radio at the university has a history dating to 1967.

== History ==
=== KTRU at 91.7 ===
The roots of KTRU began in February 1967 in a residential college at Rice, Hanszen College, where several students broadcast music in the Old Section part of the dorm using an unlicensed 2-watt AM station. The students used the call sign KHCR (Hanszen College radio) and the wiring of a buzzer system. The next fall, the station transformed into an AM carrier current station with wires running through the steam tunnel system connecting the dormitories to a studio located in the basement of the Rice Memorial Center using the call sign KOWL, a nod to the Rice University mascot.

The station moved to FM after a license was granted by the FCC to the Rice University Board of Governors. Since KOWL was already in use at the time, KTRU was chosen as a substitute. KTRU began operations in 1971 with a transmitter located in Sid Richardson College. Initially broadcasting at 10 watts, the students engineered an increase to 340 watts in April 1974 and 650 watts in October 1980. The broadcast day also increased from the initial evening-only hours to 10 to 12 hours a day on weekdays and most of the weekend. In 1981, KTRU expanded its broadcast hours to 24 hours per day. In 1987, a major expansion of the student center was completed, and KTRU's studios were relocated to the 2nd floor of the Ley Student Center.

In 1991, KTRU's transmitter was moved to the north of Houston, increased in power to 50,000 watts and was presented with an operating endowment by Mike Stude, the owner of Houston-area radio station KRTS (now KROI) and an heir of the founders of Brown & Root. This move enabled Stude's KRTS to increase from 3,000 watts to 50,000 watts and improved its own coverage without interfering with KTRU's signal on the second adjacent channel. While KTRU gained a significant increase in overall coverage area, the signal was weakened tremendously around the Rice campus. This led to the request and subsequent grant of a low-power translator broadcasting from the top of Rice Stadium on 91.5 MHz in 1999, in order to restore a strong signal around the entirety of the campus.

In 1997, a university committee released a report recommending expanding coverage of university programs to 12 hours of the broadcast day, the hiring of professional staff, and increasing marketing of the station; this is in addition to studio expansion and technology upgrades. At the recommendation of the committee, a professional General Manager was hired in 1998 with the Station Manager still staffed by a student volunteer.

In 2000, university administrators threatened to withhold financing and other resources KTRU received through student fees unless the station increased the broadcast air time devoted specifically to Rice University sports. As a result, KTRU more than doubled the number of sports games it broadcast per week. On November 30, 2000, student volunteers entered the station to host their weekly punk show. The volunteers found that their slot had been preempted by a sports game without prior notice; they were expected to operate the board during the broadcast. The DJs protested by playing punk rock music concurrently with the game during its last hour. A university administrator called the station manager and demanded that he discipline the DJs. When the station manager refused, the university administration responded by physically locking students out of the station and replacing its programming with a satellite feed from the World Radio Network. The administration cited the station's by-laws which gives the university president ultimate authority over the station. Students protested the shut-down, including a silent protest outside the University Board of Governors meeting. The station shutdown and protests received coverage in the press, and students submitted a petition in support of the student-run station with over 700 signatures. The lockout lasted 8 days before the station was returned to student control with joint oversight from the university administration.

=== Sale of 91.7 and move online ===
On August 17, 2010, Rice University announced that it had been in negotiations to sell KTRU's broadcast tower, FM frequency and license to the University of Houston System in order for 91.7 to become a full-time classical music and fine arts programming station, relieving KUHF from all music programming and allowing it to become a full-time news station. The new station at 91.7, KUHA (since resold and now KHVU), would be operated as a not-for-profit outlet, with listener support funding the new classical music home. The FCC approved the sale and granted the transfer of license to the University of Houston System on April 15, 2011.

On February 14, 2011, Pacifica Radio's KPFT (90.1 FM) began broadcasting KTRU's programming on its HD2 channel.

KTRU ceased broadcasting on 91.7 FM at 6 a.m. on April 28, 2011.

In the aftermath of the sale to the University of Houston, KTRU's programming continued to be broadcast, through an agreement with station owner Pacifica, in a digital-only format as the HD2 subchannel of 90.1 KPFT.

=== Return to the air ===
KTRU returned to an over-the-air FM broadcast in Houston when it acquired a construction permit to build a 41-watt low-power FM at 96.1 MHz, licensed as KBLT-LP, and signing on October 2, 2015. Concurrent with the launch of KBLT-LP, Pacifica removed KTRU programming from its HD2 subchannel. The current signal has a coverage radius of 5 miles (8.0 km) from Rice Stadium, covering southwest Houston within the Interstate 610 loop. As a result, the station relies heavily on online streaming to reach listeners outside of its limited broadcast range.

=== Call letters ===
The KTRU call letters, used by Rice FM radio from 1971 to 2011, had been claimed on May 17, 2011 by a new radio station owned by Grace Public Radio in La Harpe, Kansas (near Iola), after Rice abandoned them in the sale to the University of Houston. Grace Public Radio made it clear there was no desire to share the call sign with the university, for the new low-power facility to use; therefore, Rice accepted a random call sign given to the new facility by the Federal Communications Commission. There was no meaning behind the KBLT-LP call sign this facility initially used to legally broadcast.

In early 2019, the Kansas station was sold to new ownership who were more receptive in allowing Rice to reclaim use of the KTRU call letters. On August 21, 2019, Rice University acquired the right, through purchase, to once again utilize the KTRU calls as KTRU-LP; the $10,000 cost was fully funded by an anonymous donor. (The full-powered KTRU facility remains in Kansas.)

The station has promoted and sponsored independent and local music through sponsoring shows at local venues and on its university campus. The station organizes a Rice battle of the bands every year as well as an annual outdoor show featuring local and touring bands.

== Notable station alumni ==
- Rob Sides, music industry executive who worked for Warner Brothers, Electra, WEA, Giant and Revolution Records
- Stan Barber, significant contributor to Network News Transfer Protocol, and chair of the Texas IPv6 Task Force
- John Doerr, venture capitalist with Kleiner, Perkins, Caufield & Byers
- Kyle Henry, film director and editor whose work has premiered at Sundance Film Festival and the Cannes Film Festival
- Scott Hochberg, representative to Texas House District 137 since 2003 and co-founder of Logitek Audio
- Tim Holy, Ph.D., neurobiologist at Washington University School of Medicine and NIH Pioneer Awardee
- Ray Isle, Wine Editor at Food & Wine
- Sarah L. Keller, Ph.D. Professor of Chemistry and Associate Dean of Research at the University of Washington and winner of numerous awards including the 2010 Avanti Young Investigator Award, and the NSF CAREER Award her work in cell membrane lipids.
- Bruce Mast, former mayor of Albany, California
- Michele Wucker, executive director of the World Policy Institute and 2007 Guggenheim Awardee
- Richard Baraniuk, C. Sidney Burrus Professor of Electrical and Computer Engineering at Rice University, the founder and Director of the open education initiative OpenStax (formerly called Connexions), and the founder and Director of the learning science and education research infrastructure SafeInsights

== In popular culture ==
- In Jonathan Franzen's Strong Motion, protagonist Louis Holland attends Rice University where he is station manager of KTRU. He also has a brief affair with a female KTRU DJ.
