= WAYH =

Harvest, Alabama; United States
- Broadcast area: Huntsville, Alabama
- Frequency: 88.1 MHz
- Branding: 88.1 Way-FM

Programming
- Format: Christian adult contemporary

Ownership
- Owner: WAY-FM Network; (Hope Media Group)

History
- First air date: March 2003
- Call sign meaning: "Way Huntsville"

Technical information
- Licensing authority: FCC
- Facility ID: 61509
- Class: C3
- ERP: 3,500 watts
- HAAT: 204 meters (669 ft)
- Transmitter coordinates: 34°49′08″N 86°44′19″W
- Translator: (see below)

Links
- Public license information: Public file; LMS
- Webcast: Listen Live
- Website: wayfm.com

WAYH (88.1 FM, "Way FM") is a non-commercial educational radio station licensed to serve Harvest, Alabama, United States. The station serves the greater Huntsville / Decatur area and is owned and operated by the WAY-FM Network. WAYH broadcasts a youth-oriented Christian adult contemporary music format. The station's programming is also carried by broadcast translators, including one serving downtown Florence at 99.5 FM.

== History ==
This station received its original construction permit from the Federal Communications Commission on April 16, 2002. The new station was assigned the call letters WAYH by the FCC on April 24, 2002. WAYH received its license to cover from the FCC on March 11, 2003.

== Personalities ==
Notable local on-air personalities include morning show host Jack Davis. Davis also serves as operations manager for the station. Other notable weekday personalities include morning show co-host Wendy, midday host Jeff Connell, and afternoon host Donna Cruz. The syndicated Total Axxess program from Nashville, Tennessee, airs on weekday evenings.

== Community involvement ==
The station operates an outreach program called "Christmas Prayers" to help needy families in the Tennessee Valley during the Christmas holiday season. The program, started in December 2003, accepts e-mailed nominations by co-workers, neighbors, or relatives of the families.

== Awards and honors ==
In March 2007, WAYH program director Ace McKay was named as a finalist for the Echo Award for Program Director of the Year (Markets 101+) by the Christian Music Broadcasters.

== Translators ==
Call sign	Frequency	City of license	FID	ERP (W)	Class	FCC info
W243EP	96.5 FM	Madison, Alabama	72701	250	D	LMS
W254AA	98.7 FM	Colbert Heights, Alabama	72698	10	D	LMS
W258AE	99.5 FM	Florence, Alabama	58436	27	D	LMS
W297AP	107.3 FM	Golden Springs, Alabama	141192	10	D	LMS
