= KZIP =

- Amarillo, Texas; United States
- Broadcast area: Amarillo area
- Frequency: 1310 kHz
- Branding: La Caliente

Programming
- Format: Regional Mexican

Ownership
- Owner: Christian Ministries of the Valley, Inc.

History
- First air date: September 15, 1955

Technical information
- Licensing authority: FCC
- Facility ID: 16415
- Class: D
- Power: 1,000 watts day 88 watts night
- Transmitter coordinates: 35°11′02″N 101°58′11″W
- Translator: (92.7 MHz) K224EF (Amarillo)

Links
- Public license information: Public file; LMS
- Webcast: Listen live
- Website: www.hpr.network/texas

KZIP (1310 AM) is a radio station broadcasting a Regional Mexican format. Licensed to Amarillo, Texas, United States, the station serves the Amarillo area. The station is currently owned by Christian Ministries of the Valley, Inc.

On April 17, 2017, KZIP changed their format to regional Mexican, branded as "La Caliente" (format moved from KQFX 104.3 Borger, which began stunting).

== FM translator ==
In addition to the main station on 1310 kHz, KZIP is relayed by an FM translator in order to widen its broadcasts area and to provide listeners with stereo high fidelity sound.

Broadcast translator for KZIP
Call sign	Frequency	City of license	FID	ERP (W)	Class	FCC info
K224EF	92.7 FM	Amarillo, Texas	142021	250	D	LMS
