= WAYI =

Charlestown, Indiana; United States
- Broadcast area: Louisville, Kentucky
- Frequency: 104.3 MHz
- Branding: WAY-FM 104.3/105.9

Programming
- Format: Christian adult contemporary

Ownership
- Owner: WAY-FM Network; (Hope Media Group)
- Sister stations: WAYK

History
- Former call signs: WLVX (1996–1998); WBLO (1998–2003); WEGK (2003–2005); WLRX (2005–2007); WAYI (2007–2010); WWPW (2010–2012); WLUE-FM (2012–2014); WAYG (2014)
- Call sign meaning: WAY-FM Indiana

Technical information
- Licensing authority: FCC
- Facility ID: 76595
- Class: A
- ERP: 3,000 watts
- HAAT: 100 meters
- Transmitter coordinates: 38°28′55″N 85°37′33″W

Links
- Public license information: Public file; LMS
- Webcast: Listen Live
- Website: wayfm.com

WAYI (104.3 FM) is an American Christian adult contemporary radio station. The station is licensed to Charlestown, Indiana, serving the Louisville, Kentucky, radio market. The station is owned by WAY-FM Network

== History ==
The station was owned by Radio One when it was rhythmic contemporary WBLO, and switched its format in 2005 to classic country music. In 2007, Radio One sold the station to the WAY-FM Network, a Christian broadcaster and took the call letters WAYI. The station used to be a simulcast of WESI, 105.1 FM, but up until 2010 it had simulcast with WRVI.

On March 31, 2010, Radio Multi-Media, a group headed by Rene Moore (formerly of the 1980s singing duo Rene & Angela) began leasing the station, changing the format to urban contemporary and the call sign to WWPW. WWPW also added the syndicated Rickey Smiley in morning drive.

Radio-Multi-Media filed for bankruptcy in December 2011 and ceased operation of the station. Way Media applied for Special Temporary Authority with the U.S. Federal Communications Commission to take the station dark for several weeks until they were able to provide a programming feed to the transmitter site.

On February 1, 2012, the station returned to the air with a news/talk format, simulcasting WNDA 1570 AM New Albany, Indiana, under new call sign WLUE-FM.

On February 15, 2012, WLUE-FM changed its format to a 1980s-based adult contemporary format branded as "Louie 104.3". On January 31, 2014, WLUE-FM's format and lease expired and its programming returned to the Way-FM format. The company that was leasing the station was exercising an option to buy WLUE-FM from Way-FM but decided for financial reasons not to acquire the outlet and has no plans to bring the AC format back or look for another signal.

On February 3, 2014, WLUE-FM changed its format to contemporary Christian, branded as "Way FM" under new call sign WAYG. On May 8, 2014, the call sign was again changed back to WAYI.
