= KFWA =

- Weldona, Colorado; United States
- Broadcast area: Fort Morgan, Colorado
- Frequency: 103.1 MHz

Programming
- Format: Christian adult contemporary

Ownership
- Owner: WAY-FM Network; (Hope Media Group)

History
- Former call signs: KAVD (1997–2010); KLBO (2010–2011)
- Call sign meaning: Fort Morgan/Way

Technical information
- Licensing authority: FCC
- Facility ID: 79249
- Class: C1
- ERP: 25,000 watts
- HAAT: 46.3 meters
- Transmitter coordinates: 40°14′44″N 103°55′29.3″W

Links
- Public license information: Public file; LMS

KFWA (103.1 FM) is a radio station licensed to Weldona, Colorado.

== History ==
It originally was an oldies station, calling itself "Oldies 103.1". It later flipped to a simulcast of KAGM, a former country station in Strasburg.

In 2011, the station was acquired by Way-FM Media, and carries the WAY-FM Network's Christian adult contemporary format.
