= KXBJ =

- El Campo, Texas; United States
- Broadcast area: Greater Houston
- Frequency: 96.9 MHz
- Branding: 96.9 KSBJ

Programming
- Language: English
- Format: Christian adult contemporary

Ownership
- Owner: Hope Media Group
- Sister stations: KSBJ, KHVU, KHIH, KEHH, WNVU, WAY-FM Network

History
- First air date: November 22, 1968 (as KULP-FM)
- Former call signs: KXGJ (4/3/2012-4/17/2012); KNTE-FM (2007–2012); KIOX-FM (1990; 1991-2007); KXGC-FM (1990); KULP-FM (1968–1990)
- Call sign meaning: Variation of sister station KSBJ

Technical information
- Licensing authority: FCC
- Facility ID: 36507
- Class: C0
- ERP: 100,000 watts
- HAAT: 450 m (1,476 ft)
- Transmitter coordinates: 28°53′22″N 96°21′41″W
- Translator: 99.1 K256DJ (Victoria)
- Repeaters: KSBJ Humble; KEHH Livingston; KHIH Liberty; KWUP Navasota

Links
- Public license information: Public file; LMS
- Website: ksbj.org

KXBJ (96.9 FM) is a radio station licensed to El Campo, Texas, United States, serving the Texas Gulf coast area. The station is currently owned by Hope Media Group (formerly KSBJ Educational Foundation).

The station simulcasts Christian adult contemporary music from KSBJ whose studios are in Humble, Texas. It is part of a pentacast with 4 other full power FM stations, all of which are owned by the Foundation. The studio is located in Humble, and the transmitter is located west of Blessing.

== History ==
KXBJ was granted its License to Cover on November 22, 1968, as KULP-FM, having originally been proposed by local El Campo businessman Louis "Culp" Krueger and his partners, under the name Wharton County Broadcasting, who also owned 1390 KULP. 96.9 was the original FM sister to 1390 and the first FM station licensed in Wharton County. KULP-FM was licensed with an ERP of 26.8 kilowatts, with a transmit site located one mile north of Downtown El Campo. The original studio location was at 515 East Jackson Street, which still serves as the studio location for the KULP (AM) facility to this day.

The construction permit for KULP-FM remained under the ownership of Wharton County Broadcasting until 1967 when the FCC granted an application to reassign the FM facility permit and the licensed AM facility to Bar-B Broadcasting, which was led by Fred Barbee, who was also the owner of the El Campo Leader-News newspaper. For many years, KULP, KULP-FM, & the Leader-News were cross-owned by Barbee and superserved El Campo and the surrounding Wharton County rural areas with local news, weather, farm reports, high school sports, and country music on the radio dial.

The station was assigned the callsign KIOX-FM on November 15, 1990 before quickly switching to KXGC-FM two weeks later on December 1, 1990. The change to KXGC-FM would prove to be short-lived as the station reverted to KIOX-FM on February 4, 1991. The facility would then carry on the calls originally assigned to 1270 AM in 1957, which itself was lost for the neighboring town of Bay City in an illegal relocation of the facility to Sugarland, Texas by then owner Chameleon Radio Corporation, in an attempt to serve the Houston area with leased brokered programming on 1270 as KFCC in 2002, leaving KULP as the lone AM facility licensed to the town.

With the switch to KIOX-FM, it remained a country station, locally operated in El Campo, and now using the branding of "X 97". The station would continue to hold the heritage call letters even after the sale to Liberman Broadcasting, resulting in the station changing to a Spanish-language format. KIOX-FM was finally retired on December 13, 2007, becoming KNTE-FM in order to match the calls with the "El Norte" format that Liberman had implemented on 96.9. The heritage KIOX call set was quickly resurrected by LaGrange Broadcasting Corporation on January 4, 2008, for their own Country station licensed to Edna, which also serves El Campo and Wharton County. KIOX-FM continues to reside at 96.1 FM, currently owned by Mark Porter of Globecom Media.

On January 18, 2012 the sale of the station from Liberman Broadcasting to the KSBJ Educational Foundation was announced, and the FCC approved the sale on February 28, 2012. The sale closed on April 13, 2012, with the station becoming the sister to KSBJ in Humble. KSBJ Educational Foundation requested the current call set, and it was granted by the FCC 4 days later on April 17.
