= WAYK =

Coordinates: 38.174°N 85.914°W

- Valley Station, Kentucky; United States
- Broadcast area: Louisville metropolitan area
- Frequency: 105.9 MHz
- Branding: WAY-FM 105.9/104.3

Programming
- Format: Christian contemporary
- Network: WAY-FM Network

Ownership
- Owner: WAY-FM Network; (Hope Media Group)
- Sister stations: WAYI

History
- First air date: September 1, 1993
- Former call signs: WVSL (1991–1993); WQNF (1993–1995); WXNU (1995–1997); WHTE (1997); WRVI (1997–2010); WAYI (2010–2011); WSYI (2011–2013)
- Call sign meaning: WAY-FM Kentucky

Technical information
- Licensing authority: FCC
- Facility ID: 50764
- Class: A
- ERP: 500 watts
- HAAT: 155 meters (509 ft)

Links
- Public license information: Public file; LMS
- Webcast: Listen live
- Website: wayfm.com/louisville/onair/

WAYK (105.9 FM) is a non-commercial radio station licensed to Valley Station, Kentucky, United States, serving the Louisville metropolitan area as an owned-and-operated station of the WAY-FM Network. WAY-FM is also heard on WAYI (104.3 FM) in nearby Charlestown, Indiana.

== History ==
It was assigned the call letters WVSL in 1991, while it was still a construction permit. The station was built and began testing its signal in the spring of 1993. The station officially signed on the air on September 1, 1993. It had an active rock format as "QMF Too," in reference to then-sister station WQMF (105.9 changed to the WQNF call letters).

In July 1995, the station shifted to modern rock, rebranded as "Q105.9", and changed call sign to WXNU in December 1995. The station would be sold to Cox Radio in the summer of 1995. On September 13, 1996, it flipped to Modern AC as "Hits 105.9", and later took the call sign WHTE. This was short-lived; in August 1997, WRVI, its rock adult contemporary format, and "River" branding moved from 94.7 FM to 105.9. The format would later shift to all-80s hits.

In August 1999, the station was sold to Salem Communications, the largest owner of Christian radio stations. It flipped to Contemporary Christian music, while retaining the "River" branding. On May 2, 2011, WSYI rebranded as "Shine 105.9".

In 2008, WSYI was bought by Way-FM for $3 million. The station changed its call sign to the current WAYK on December 19, 2013. The call letters refer to "Way-FM Kentucky," the branding for the Christian Adult Contemporary format airing on WAYK.
