= KXIT (AM) =

- Dalhart, Texas; United States
- Frequency: 1240 kHz
- Branding: 94.5 The Pulse

Programming
- Format: Classic rock

Ownership
- Owner: Rogco Family I, LLC
- Sister stations: KBEX, KXDJ

History
- First air date: 1946

Technical information
- Licensing authority: FCC
- Facility ID: 15300
- Class: C
- Power: 1,000 watts (unlimited)
- Transmitter coordinates: 36°05′45″N 102°30′38″W
- Translator: 94.5 K233BY (Dalhart)

Links
- Public license information: Public file; LMS
- Webcast: Listen Live
- Website: kxit.com

KXIT (1240 AM) is a radio station licensed to serve Dalhart, Texas. The station is owned by Rogco Family, I, LLC. KXIT changed programming from the country music format to a variety of 1960s, 1970s, and 1980s classic rock. The station was assigned the KXIT call letters by the Federal Communications Commission.

KXIT broadcasts from local schools to support students. Programs aired include: UIL, Halloween stories, pep rallies, open house and many other programs. KXIT also broadcasts throughout the year special events. Some examples include, the Veterans Day parade, XIT Rodeo Reunion, the Elks Lodge dances, Dalhart Fire Department annual fundraiser, and the XIT Rangers.
