= KHIH =

KSBJ radio station in Liberty, Texas

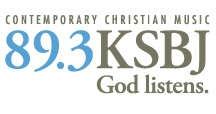
- Liberty, Texas; United States
- Broadcast area: Greater Houston; Golden Triangle
- Frequency: 99.9 MHz
- Branding: 89.3 KSBJ

Programming
- Language: English
- Format: Christian adult contemporary
- Affiliations: KSBJ

Ownership
- Owner: Hope Media Group
- Sister stations: KSBJ, KHVU, KXBJ, KEHH

History
- First air date: September 20, 1980; 45 years ago (as KSHN)
- Former call signs: KSHN (1980–2019)

Technical information
- Licensing authority: FCC
- Facility ID: 68125
- Class: C2
- ERP: 26,000 watts
- HAAT: 207 m (679 ft)
- Transmitter coordinates: 30°3′5″N 94°31′37″W

Links
- Public license information: Public file; LMS
- Webcast: Listen Live
- Website: ksbj.org

KHIH (99.9 FM) is an American terrestrial radio station based in Liberty, Texas. It serves part of the Golden Triangle and is owned by Hope Media Group (formerly KSBJ Educational Foundation). The station is part of a pentacast with 4 other owned and operated Christian adult contemporary facilities branded as "89.3 KSBJ", which relays the primary KSBJ in Humble, Texas.

Previous to the acquisition by KSBJ, KHIH operated as KSHN (branded as "Shine All 9"), featuring a full service format, programmed with adult contemporary, classic country, and oldies music. KSHN, and its AM predecessor 1050 KPXE, superserved the Liberty-Dayton area for over 50 years, having been continuously owned by Bill Buchanan since 1977.

KSHN was famously known for airing high school sports programming for both Liberty and Dayton High School Varsity athletics, and when both towns had varsity games scheduled simultaneously, KSHN split the audio of the station, running the Liberty game on the left audio channel, while the Dayton game was run on the right channel. KSHN was the only station in the area that split their audio in this manner.

KSHN's last day of over the air operation was July 1, 2019. The last 2 songs played were "Theme from A Summer Place" by Percy Faith and his Orchestra followed by "Java" by Al Hirt. The previous full service format remains available online at KSHN.com, the former website associated with this facility. The station's studios are located on Wilson Rd. in Humble, with its transmitter located in Devers, Texas.
