= KAWA =

Radio station in Sanger, Texas

- Sanger, Texas; United States
- Broadcast area: Dallas–Fort Worth metroplex; Sherman–Denison metropolitan area
- Frequency: 89.7 MHz (HD Radio)
- Branding: 89.7 WAY-FM

Programming
- Format: Christian adult contemporary
- Subchannels: HD2: Vida Unida (Spanish Christian); HD3: Worship 24/7 (Christian worship); HD4: Hindi Christian

Ownership
- Owner: WAY-FM Network; (Hope Media Group)

History
- First air date: 1999
- Former call signs: KBJV (1998–1999); KTPW (1999–2004); KVRK (2004–2015)
- Call sign meaning: Contains WA for "Way"

Technical information
- Licensing authority: FCC
- Facility ID: 76285
- Class: C
- ERP: 95,000 watts
- HAAT: 572 meters (1,877 ft)
- Transmitter coordinates: 33°33′37″N 96°57′34″W

Links
- Public license information: Public file; LMS
- Webcast: Listen Live
- Website: wayfm.com HD2: vidaunida.com HD3: worship247.com

KAWA (89.7 MHz) is an American Christian adult contemporary music formatted radio station located near Dallas, Texas. It is a WAY-FM Network owned and operated station through Hope Media Group (a non-profit entity). As a non-profit under previous ownership of Research Educational Foundation, Inc., it annually hosted two fund-raising drives to remain on the air. It broadcasts at 95,000 watts from a tower in Sanger, Texas.

== History ==
After a two-year stay in Florida, Eldred and Raye Nell Thomas returned to the Dallas area and decided to start a Christian radio station. Through other business interests, Mr. Thomas learned of KVTT, now KKXT, an existing station that operated as an extension of Elkins Institute, a broadcasting training facility. With retirement looming, Bill Elkins, the founder and president of the Elkins Institute, wanted to find someone to continue with the station he had operated since 1950. In March 1976, Mr. Thomas became the president of Research Educational Foundation, Inc. and General Manager of KVTT. (Eldred and Raye Nell Thomas are now both deceased and KVTT's FM 91.7 frequency was sold to local public broadcaster KERA in 2009.)

In 1994, KVTT applied to the Federal Communications Commission (FCC) to begin broadcasting a full-time Christian rock station for the Dallas/Fort Worth Metroplex. Around the same time, 1995, the station began to target the area youth with their music programming in the evenings with "Power Mix" on weeknights, "Youth Wake" (later "Lighthouse 21") on Saturday nights and Spin 180 on Sunday nights. "Lighthouse 21" also ran a TV show on KSTR 52 in Dallas.

It took over four years for the application to be processed and granted by the FCC. On January 18, 1999, a license was granted to broadcast at 14,000 watts as KTPW and transmit from a tower north of the Dallas/Fort Worth Metroplex in Sanger, Texas. The new station began broadcasting on July 27, 1999.

In 2004 REF Inc. released its responsibility to KVTT and became responsible only for Power FM. The KVRK call letters were established on June 14, 2004. Power FM also had a TV show on JCTV called FM..

Previous Power FM ident used until 2015.

In May 2015, WAY-FM announced plans to acquire the station. The said acquisition was completed effective on September 16, 2016, at a purchase price of $2 million. The call sign was changed to KAWA on September 24, 2015, and a slight format change from Christian Rock to CCM was made. The previous "Power FM" format is still available to stream live through its internet presence and their app.

As of late September 2016, KAWA holds a construction permit to increase power from 14,000 to 45,000 watts and an application to further increase to 90,000 watts.

== Signal ==
Unlike most of the area's FM stations like competitor KLTY, which transmit their signals from Cedar Hill, KAWA transmits its signal from an area West of Collinsville. Therefore, KAWA's signal is much stronger in the Northern parts of the Dallas/Fort Worth metroplex including Dallas, Denton, and McKinney as well as the cities of Decatur, Gainesville, Sherman, and Bonham, to as far North as Ardmore and Durant, Oklahoma, but is considerably weaker in Fort Worth and areas south of Dallas.
