= KNUZ-TV =

- Houston, Texas; United States
- Channels: Analog: 39 (UHF)

Programming
- Affiliations: DuMont

Ownership
- Owner: KNUZ Television Company
- Sister stations: KNUZ

History
- First air date: October 22, 1953
- Last air date: June 25, 1954 (Note: The construction permit remained in force, was sold in 1965, and was used to launch KHTV on January 6, 1967.)

KNUZ-TV (channel 39) was a television station in Houston, Texas, United States, affiliated with the DuMont Television Network. It signed on the air on October 22, 1953, as Houston's third television station (four, including KGUL-TV channel 11 in Galveston) and first ultra high frequency (UHF) outlet; it closed on June 25, 1954, after having lost money its entire existence and competing with two existing commercial very high frequency (VHF) outlets. KNUZ-TV's studios and transmitter were located at 4343 Cullen Boulevard in the Texas Television Center on the University of Houston campus.

== History ==
On September 11, 1952, radio station KNUZ filed with the Federal Communications Commission (FCC) for a construction permit to build a television station on channel 39 in Houston, which was granted on January 7, 1953. As part of promotional activities, the station set up a temporary UHF transmitter for what was billed as "the first public UHF transmission in Texas", a demonstration at the downtown Houston Joske's store.

In May 1953, groundbreaking was held on KNUZ-TV's studios, which would be located at 4343 Cullen Boulevard in the Texas Television Center on the campus of the University of Houston; channel 39 would share the tower of the university's KUHT. The Television Center was designed to accommodate other stations: the construction permit for KXYZ-TV on channel 29 also specified the site. Programs began October 22, 1953, after a test pattern was sent out starting on the 11th. However, some broadcasts were made during the test period: the first broadcast of a Houston high school game, between Austin and Pasadena, on September 15 and a DuMont boxing telecast two days later. After the initial launch, however, the station had to go off the air and wait for the antenna to be properly mounted on the tower, which took a week. At the outset, in addition to network programming, KNUZ-TV aired a local cooking show and shopping program, as well as the sports programs. By December, the majority of its lineup consisted of local fare. The station even produced a remote telecast direct from HMS Sheffield when it was in Houston in March 1954.

As an early UHF station in the days before the All-Channel Receiver Act, like others, channel 39 was hindered by the fact that many televisions of the day did not receive UHF stations without tuning strips or converters fitted. The station claimed that 45,000 sets were converted by November 1953 and that 77,000 had converted by May 1954, but that was little comfort to the parents of a girl who sung on a channel 39 program; they had to drive to a television showroom to watch their daughter perform.

Despite boasting that business was up and more people were buying UHF-equipped television sets, not all was well at channel 39. On May 20, 1954, the station filed a protest with the FCC. It claimed that, in allowing KGUL-TV (channel 11) in Galveston to move to a site that also provided coverage of Houston, the commission was "starving" KNUZ-TV, which "undoubtedly" would have been Houston's CBS affiliate otherwise. The VHF station responded by claiming that channel 39 sought to "minimize the amount of television service to Houstonians".

The station went dark on June 25, 1954, making it the 15th UHF station to close; station president Max Jacobs noted that the business had continually run at a loss. He also cited an inability to obtain enough network programming to secure national advertising accounts. While the station said it would analyze the prospects of returning to the air on a limited basis if it could secure enough advertising, the University of Houston then proceeded to lease the studio facility and equipment to upstart ABC affiliate KTRK-TV (channel 13) in order to expedite its debut, which took place that November. The studios were used by KTRK-TV until that station moved to its current studio on Bissonnet Street in 1961; after being briefly used as a NASA computer center, the studios were then occupied by KUHT in 1964, a move foreseen when the joint facility proposal was agreed between KNUZ and the university. The station remained there for more than 35 years; in 2000, it relocated across campus to the current LeRoy and Lucile Melcher Center for Public Broadcasting. The building was then adapted for use by UH as a clinical research facility for audiology and psychological research.

KNUZ-TV remained an active construction permit for more than a decade after its closure and was never deleted or surrendered. In 1955, Supreme Broadcasting Company of New Orleans proposed to revive the station as part of an expansion plan, in association with the manager of KNUZ radio. It was one of 29 such construction permits that had once operated or had never been built to which the FCC sent letters in November 1964, asking them to activate the channel again or have it stripped so other companies could apply for the allocation. That December, KNUZ radio analyzed whether it should reactivate the channel. In May 1965, a controlling 80-percent interest in the KNUZ Television Company was sold to WKY Television System of Oklahoma City, which began making its own plans for construction. This application was granted in October 1965. In the year that followed, the call letters were changed to KHTV; new facilities were commissioned including studios on Westpark Drive and a transmitter at the tower used by KPRC-TV and KHOU; and channel 39 returned to the air as KHTV on January 6, 1967.
