= KUBJ =

- Brenham, Texas; United States
- Frequency: 89.7 MHz
- Branding: 89.3 KSBJ

Programming
- Format: Christian adult contemporary
- Network: KSBJ

Ownership
- Owner: Hope Media Group
- Sister stations: KSBJ, KHVU

History
- First air date: 2005
- Former call signs: KBEX (2005–2008)

Technical information
- Licensing authority: FCC
- Facility ID: 85796
- Class: C2
- ERP: 17,500 watts
- HAAT: 124.0 meters (406.8 ft)
- Transmitter coordinates: 30°3′17.00″N 96°30′26.00″W

Links
- Public license information: Public file; LMS
- Website: ksbj.org

KUBJ (89.7 FM) is a radio station licensed to serve Brenham, Texas, United States. It is owned by and simulcasts KSBJ in the Houston area.

== History ==
The American Family Association received the original construction permit for this station from the Federal Communications Commission on September 26, 2005. The new station was assigned the call sign KBEX by the FCC on October 10, 2005. Prior to the sign on of this station, KBEX had been used as a common stock call sign for fictional TV and radio stations in film, radio and television productions.

In December 2006, the American Family Association reached an agreement to sell KBEX to the Educational Media Foundation as part of an 18-station deal valued at a total of $2.5 million. The deal was approved by the FCC on February 7, 2007, and the transaction was consummated on March 23, 2007. Less than one month later, in April 2007, the Educational Media Foundation, reached an agreement to sell KBEX to the KSBJ Educational Foundation. The deal was approved by the FCC on November 1, 2007, and the transaction was consummated on December 12, 2007.

KUBJ received its license to cover from the FCC on September 18, 2008. On September 19, 2008, the call sign was changed to the current KUBJ.

On July 2, 2012, KSBJ switched KUBJ, along the three other facilities, from the main KSBJ Contemporary Christian format to their secondary "NGEN Radio" programming, after purchasing then 96.9 KNTE in El Campo from Liberman Broadcasting. The Brenham transmitter later switched back to the main KSBJ programming.
