= NGEN Radio =

American Christian hip-hop and pop station

- Country: United States
- Broadcast area: Houston, Texas
- Headquarters: Humble, Texas

Ownership
- Owner: Hope Media Group

History
- Launch date: November 18, 2010 (14 years ago)

Links
- Webcast: Listen Live
- Website: ngenradio.com

NGEN Radio (stands for Now Generation Radio) is a Christian hip-hop and pop station based in Houston, Texas. NGEN plays artists like NF, Lecrae, Tori Kelly, Twenty One Pilots, Andy Mineo, Needtobreathe, KB, Gawvi, Bizzle and TobyMac, with remixes of Contemporary Christian artists.

NGEN is a sister station of 89.3 KSBJ, a contemporary Christian station. On February 24, 2016, the KSBJ Educational Foundation (now Hope Media Group) announced it was purchasing KUHA, formerly a classical music station, from the University of Houston for $10 million. This gave NGEN a city-grade analog FM signal for the first time. KUHA went dark on July 15, 2016, in preparation for NGEN's launch on 91.7, while changing its call sign to KXNG. KXNG eventually launched the format on August 8, 2016. In 2021, Hope Media Group announced that the NGEN programming would become exclusive to digital platforms, with NGEN's stations adopting a new Spanish Christian AC format, branded as Vida Unida.

On June 27, 2022, Hope Media Group announced that it will combine NGEN Radio and Way Now on July 15.

== Final Stations ==
- KHVU (91.7 FM) Houston
  - K226AE (93.1 FM) College Station
  - K217GB (91.3 FM) Houston near Rice University
- KVUD (89.5 FM) Bay City
- KVUJ (91.1 FM) Lake Jackson
- KWUP (92.5 FM HD2) Navasota
  - K259AH (99.7 FM) Brenham
