= KBEX (FM) =

- Dalhart, Texas; United States
- Broadcast area: Amarillo, Texas
- Frequency: 96.1 MHz
- Branding: La Poderosa 96.1

Programming
- Format: Regional Mexican

Ownership
- Owner: Viva Media, LLC; (Maria Ceniceros)
- Sister stations: KAMT, KQFX

History
- First air date: 1966 (as KXIT-FM)
- Former call signs: KXIT-FM (1966–2008); KIXK (2008–2010); KPPC (2010–2011); KXIT-FM (2011–2013)

Technical information
- Licensing authority: FCC
- Facility ID: 74311
- Class: C1
- ERP: 100,000 watts
- HAAT: 235 meters (771 ft)
- Transmitter coordinates: 35°44′16.8″N 102°15′40.9″W

Links
- Public license information: Public file; LMS
- Webcast: Listen Live
- Website: lapoderosa961.com

KBEX (96.1 FM) is a radio station broadcasting a Regional Mexican format. Licensed to Dalhart, Texas, United States, it serves the Amarillo metropolitan area. The station is owned by Maria Ceniceros, through licensee Viva Media, LLC. Its studios are located in Amarillo, and its transmitter is northeast of Channing, Texas.

The station was assigned the KBEX call letters by the Federal Communications Commission on February 20, 2013. KBEX is the second station to use the KBEX call sign. Prior to 2005, KBEX was typically used as a stock call sign for fictional TV and radio stations in film, radio and television productions until the sign-on of KBEX in Brenham, Texas (which held the calls until 2008), that year.
