= WNVU (FM) =

Radio station in New Rochelle, New York

- New Rochelle, New York; United States
- Broadcast area: New York metropolitan area
- Frequency: 93.5 MHz (HD Radio)
- Branding: Vida Unida

Programming
- Language: Spanish
- Format: Spanish Christian radio
- Subchannels: HD2: WayFM Network (Contemporary Christian) HD3:Worship 24/7 (Gospel) HD4: Religious Talk (Russian)

Ownership
- Owner: Hope Media Group

History
- First air date: September 13, 1948; 78 years ago
- Former call signs: WGNR-FM (1948–1953); WNRC-FM (1953–1958); WWES-FM (1958–1959); WVOX-FM (1959–1977); WRTN (1977–2006); WVIP-FM (2006); WVIP (2006–2023)
- Call sign meaning: New York Vida Unida

Technical information
- Licensing authority: FCC
- Facility ID: 28023
- Class: A
- ERP: 1,750 watts
- HAAT: 132 meters (433 ft)
- Transmitter coordinates: 40°52′48.4″N 73°52′38.5″W

Links
- Public license information: Public file; LMS
- Webcast: Listen live
- Website: vidaunida.com HD2:https://wayfm.com/?reload=true

WNVU (93.5 FM) is a non-commercial radio station licensed to New Rochelle, New York, and serving the New York metropolitan area. WNVU is owned by the Houston, Texas–based non-profit Hope Media Group, and broadcasts a Spanish Christian radio format known as Vida Unida. The network features Christian music along with Christian talk and teaching programs.

WNVU is a Class A station with an effective radiated power (ERP) of 1,750 watts. WNVU's transmitter is located on the campus of Montefiore Medical Center in the New York City borough of the Bronx. It shares its tower with Fordham University-owned WFUV (the tower's primary tenant) and another religious station, VCY America-owned WVBN.

== History ==
=== WGNR-FM, WNRC-FM, WWES-FM ===
For much of its history, 93.5 was the sister station to WVOX (1460 AM). The station signed on the air on September 13, 1948. Its original call sign was WGNR-FM, owned by the New Rochelle Broadcasting Service, Inc. The FM station was followed two years later by the launch of WGNR (AM).

New Rochelle Broadcasting Service, however, went bankrupt in 1952. The stations went dark on August 1. After the appointment of a receiver, Radio New Rochelle, Inc., owned by the Iodice Family, acquired the stations and changed 93.5 FM's call letters to WNRC-FM. FM 93.5 returned to the air in October 1953. It retained that call sign through a transfer of control to the Daniels family in 1955.

WNRC-FM became WWES-FM on December 10, 1958, as both stations were sold to Radio Westchester for $225,000. The Radio Westchester sale made it a sister to the original WVIP (1310 AM, now WRVP) in Mount Kisco, in Northern Westchester County.

=== WVOX-FM, WRTN and WVIP ===
On February 26, 1959, the station switched its call letters to WVOX-FM. WVOX-AM-FM joined a growing radio operation owned by the New York Herald-Tribune newspaper. By 1962, after John Hay Whitney bought the Herald-Tribune the year before, the paper's radio division included WVOX-AM-FM, WVIP, WGHQ in Kingston and WFYI (now WJDM) in Mineola. With the shutdown of the Herald-Tribune, Whitney Communications sold WVOX-AM-FM and WGHQ-AM-FM in 1968 to Hudson-Westchester Radio for $800,000. Hudson-Westchester was led by William O'Shaughnessy, a former account executive with the Herald-Tribune Radio Network who had been WVOX's general manager since 1965.

Under O'Shaughnessy's ownership, the WVOX stations simulcast a community-oriented talk format, inviting local civic leaders, elected officials and local volunteers to do shows on the stations. In 1973, WVOX-AM-FM moved into modern facilities in New Rochelle, known as One Broadcast Forum. WVOX-FM ended the simulcast with WVOX (AM) around 1977, changing its call sign to WRTN and adopting an adult standards format, playing pop classics from the 1950s, '60s and '70s. Some evenings, it experimented with active rock and heavy metal music.

The station changed its call sign to WVIP in 2006 (flip-flopping with WRTN for a two-month period between August and October 2006). The station also ended the adult standards/rock music hybrid and began airing a brokered format primarily consisting of music and informational programming for the local Afro-Caribbean community.

=== Sale to Hope Media Group ===
Whitney Global Media (parent of Hudson-Westchester Radio) owner William O'Shaughnessy died on May 28, 2022. On July 3, 2023, his estate announced that WVIP would be sold to the Houston-based Hope Media Group (formerly known as WAY-FM), a nonprofit Christian radio broadcaster. Hope Media later announced that it would install its Spanish-language music network Vida Unida on the station upon its takeover.

The sale announcement was met with both shock and disappointment among WVIP's Caribbean programmers and audience. Two months later, it was announced that WVOX would be divested in a donation sale. The move ended the O'Shaughnessy family's involvement in radio after nearly six decades.

The sale of 93.5 FM was approved by the Federal Communications Commission (FCC) in mid-August 2023. The deal was consummated on August 31, 2023. Hope Media began operating the station on September 1, 2023, carrying its Spanish Christian network. The call sign was change to WNVU to represent New York Vida Unida.
