= KHVU =

Christian contemporary hit radio station in Houston

- Houston, Texas; United States
- Broadcast area: Greater Houston
- Frequency: 91.7 MHz (HD Radio)
- Branding: Vida Unida 91.7

Programming
- Languages: Analog/HD1: Spanish; HD2: English; HD3: Igbo; HD4: Malayalam
- Format: Christian adult contemporary
- Subchannels: HD2: Contemporary worship music (Worship 24/7); HD3: Christian; HD4: Christian

Ownership
- Owner: Hope Media Group
- Sister stations: KSBJ, KEHH, KHIH, KXBJ, KUBJ, WNVU, WAY-FM Network

History
- First air date: May 20, 1971
- Former call signs: KTRU (1971–2011); KUHA (2011–2016); KXNG (2016–2021)
- Call sign meaning: "Houston Vida Unida"

Technical information
- Licensing authority: FCC
- Facility ID: 72685
- Class: C2
- ERP: 50,000 watts (analog); 4,000 watts (digital)
- HAAT: 150 meters (490 ft)
- Transmitter coordinates: 30°3′54″N 95°16′10″W
- Translator: See § Translators
- Repeaters: 91.1 KVUJ (Lake Jackson); 89.5 KVUD (Bay City)

Links
- Public license information: Public file; LMS
- Website: www.vidaunida.com

KHVU (91.7 FM, "Vida Unida 91.7") is a non-commercial radio station licensed to Houston, Texas, United States, serving Greater Houston. Owned by Hope Media Group, it airs a Spanish-language Christian adult contemporary format, with studios on Treble Drive in Humble, Texas, near Bush Intercontinental Airport, and the transmitter is located off Sorters McClellan Road in Porter.

The 91.7 frequency was established by Rice University as student-run KTRU. Rice sold the station in 2010 to the University of Houston, which ran it as classical music outlet KUHA. Due to chronic lack of listener support, UH sold it to KSBJ, which first installed a Christian hip-hop format, before later changing the station to its current Spanish Christian programming.

== History ==
=== Rice University ===
On May 20, 1971, the station first signed on as KTRU, operated by Rice University. Studios were located in Sid Richardson College on the Rice campus. Initially broadcasting at 10 watts, the students engineered an increase to 340 watts in April 1974 and 650 watts in October 1980.

The broadcast day also increased from the initial evening-only hours to 10 to 12 hours a day on weekdays and most of the weekend. In 1981, the station expanded its broadcast hours to 24 hours per day. In 1987, a major expansion of the student center was completed and the station's studios were relocated to the 2nd floor of the Ley Student Center.

In 1991, the station's transmitter was moved to the north of Houston, increasing in power to 50,000 watts. The station was presented with an operating endowment by Mike Stude, the owner of Houston-area radio station 92.1 KRTS (now KROI) and an heir of the founders of Brown & Root. This move enabled Stude's station, which aired classical music, to increase from 3,000 watts to 50,000 watts without interfering with KTRU's signal.

=== Classical music - University of Houston ===
On August 17, 2010, the University of Houston announced its intent to purchase KTRU's tower, frequency and license from Rice. That would give the university the ownership of two Houston FM stations. The university's main FM signal, KUHF 88.7 MHz, would go from a mix of news and classical music to all news and information. The 91.7 frequency would give classical music and fine arts programming a full-time outlet, with the proposed call sign KUHA. The FCC approved the purchase and transfer of license to the University of Houston System on April 15, 2011. At 6:00 AM on April 28, 2011, KTRU went dark.

KUHA began broadcasting May 16, 2011. The student-run KTRU programming was transferred to the HD2 subchannel of local Pacifica Radio member station 90.1 KPFT. KPFT dropped KTRU on its HD2 subchannel in October 2015, when KTRU programming began broadcasting on 96.1 KBLT-LP (now KTRU-LP), which presently broadcasts Rice University student programming.

KUHA debuted in 2011 with a distinctive classical sound. Unlike most stations airing the format, hosts selected their own playlists from the 50,000 classical music CD library owned by the station, one of the largest in the world. Because of this freedom, each live classical program on the station had its own unique flavor.

KUHA struggled to raise enough money to pay for its staff and facilities. In an effort to remain solvant, on November 7, 2013, KUHA fired nearly all its announcers and staff. The station replaced nearly all of its locally produced programming with Public Radio International's "Classical 24," a nationally syndicated classical music service produced in Minnesota. It also began airing nationally distributed public radio programs dealing with classical music, such as From the Top, Performance Today and Pipedreams (which features organ music).

KUHA was the flagship radio home of the Houston Symphony. Its broadcasts were heard on Wednesday evenings on KUHA when in season. When the classical format moved to KUHF-HD2, the agreement with the Houston Symphony remained in place and its broadcasts are now heard on KUHF-HD2.

On March 3, 2014, Houston Public Radio's KUHA and KUHF, along with Houston PBS television station KUHT Channel 8, were all rebranded as "Houston Public Media."

=== KSBJ ownership ===
KUHA's fundraising and financial picture did not improve, despite the staff cuts. On August 20, 2015, the University of Houston System announced its intention to sell KUHA, after which the classical music format would only be heard on KUHF's HD2 subchannel and online streaming platforms, as well as a fifth subchannel of television station KUHT. The sale was approved by the UH System Board of Regents.

On February 24, 2016, the university announced that the station was being sold for $10 million to the KSBJ Educational Foundation, which planned to flip the station to NGEN Radio—a Christian hip-hop format that began online in 2010—upon taking control. With the impending sale, KUHA dropped almost all references to the 91.7 frequency in May and rebranded itself as Houston Public Media Classical, running advertisements for the digital streams of the format to redirect listeners.

On May 20, 2016, the license reassignment for KUHA was granted by the Federal Communications Commission. With the ownership change, plans were made to change the station's call letters when the hand-off took place.

On July 1, 2016, KUHA announced that it would cease broadcasting on July 15. KSBJ planned for NGEN programming to begin broadcasting on 91.7 on August 8. On July 14, KUHA ended regular programming. It began airing prerecorded announcements that the station had ceased broadcasting and redirected listeners to the digital streams. The 91.3 translator, which was included in the sale to KSBJ, went dark.

At 9 o'clock the following morning, KSBJ's purchase of KUHA closed. Consequently, at that time the station stopped airing its prerecorded announcements and signed off. KSBJ said it would replace the old transmitter that had been used since 1990 with a brand-new transmitter. KSBJ also announced that the call letters would be changed to KXNG. The translator, 91.3 K217GB, also stopped broadcasting dead air and went silent that day.

KXNG returned to the air two weeks later on August 1, 2016, stunting with a varied playlist of secular dance music under the branding K-Dance. The following Friday, the K217GB translator returned to the air rebroadcasting KXNG and the dance music stunt. Unlike KXNG, K217GB's transmitter was not replaced or modified.

At 6:00 AM on August 8, 2016, the stunting ended, and the NGEN Radio format made its debut with a launch party that was simulcast on KSBJ. During its time on the air, 91.7 NGEN Radio utilized a live and local lineup: "Marcus In The Morning" in AM drive time, the "Mid-Day Show with NeallyTime W/ Neal Hopson," the "Afternoon Show with Brant Hansen," "RaJan Monroe @Night" and the "Brant Hansen Show" in late nights.

On July 13, 2021, KYBJ's callsign was changed to KVUJ. On August 20, 2021, KXNG's callsign was changed to KHVU and KZBJ's callsign was changed to KVUD.

On September 16, 2021, Hope Media Group announced that NGEN Radio would be moved exclusively to digital distribution on its website and app on November 8, at which point a new, undisclosed format would launch on KHVU. On November 1, 2021, Hope Media Group announced that a Spanish-language Christian adult contemporary format targeting Hispanic Americans, branded as Vida Unida, would replace the NGEN format on KHVU and all of its other stations broadcasting the format. The NGEN format ceased broadcasting on KHVU on November 8, at which point the station began airing messages both redirecting NGEN's listeners to digital platforms and promoting the upcoming Vida Unida format, which debuted at 6:00 AM on November 10.

== Translators and rebroadcasters ==
Included in the purchase of KTRU was an FM translator that improved reception in the area near the campus of Rice University. The translator has been relocated off-campus after the sale and moved to an adjacent frequency. This translator was also included in the sale to KSBJ.

During its ownership by the University of Houston, the translator rebroadcast KUHF-HD2, which simulcast KUHA. Upon the completion of the sale to KSBJ, the translator reverted to rebroadcasting the 91.7 feed.

On August 8, 2016, KXNG added a second translator, K258BZ, with both translators relaying the main KXNG signal; this was sold off in 2019. Since then, KHVU has added K226AE, allowing its programming to be heard over the air in College Station, Texas.

Two further KSBJ-owned stations, KVUD (89.5 FM) in Bay City and KVUJ (formerly KYBJ, 91.1 FM) in Lake Jackson, also simulcast Vida Unida. It is also rebroadcast on K259AH (99.7 FM) in Brenham.

Broadcast translators for KHVU
Call sign	Frequency	City of license	FID	ERP (W)	HAAT	Class	FCC info	Notes
K217GB	91.3 FM	Houston, Texas	93168	99	57 m (187 ft)	D	LMS	First air date: October 10, 2000 (19 years ago) as K218DA at 91.5
K226AE	93.1 FM	College Station, Texas	65772	250	82 m (269 ft)	D	LMS	First air date: September 20, 1993
K259AH	99.7 FM	Brenham, Texas	65768	115	123 m (404 ft)	D	LMS	
