= KQFX (FM) =

Radio station in Borger–Amarillo, Texas

Simulcast of KBEX
- Borger, Texas; United States
- Broadcast area: Amarillo area
- Frequency: 104.3 MHz
- Branding: La Poderosa 96.1 & 104.3

Programming
- Format: Regional Mexican

Ownership
- Owner: Viva Media, LLC

History
- First air date: March 1975 (as KBBB-FM)
- Former call signs: KBBB-FM (1975–1979); KDKQ (1979–1984); KDXR (1984–1992)

Technical information
- Licensing authority: FCC
- Facility ID: 61033
- Class: C1
- ERP: 100,000 watts
- HAAT: 175 meters (574 ft)
- Transmitter coordinates: 35°25′34.1″N 101°36′48.6″W

Links
- Public license information: Public file; LMS
- Webcast: Listen live
- Website: lapoderosa961.com

KQFX (104.3 FM) is a radio station licensed to Borger, Texas, United States. The station serves the Amarillo, Texas, area. The station is currently owned by Viva Media LLC

== History ==
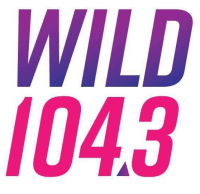
Logo as Wild 104.3

KQFX began broadcasting as KBBB-FM in 1975 and changed to KDKQ on January 2, 1979. On December 1, 1984, the station changed its call sign to KDXR, then again on April 13, 1992, to the current KQFX.

On April 15, 2017, with the announced sale of KQFX from Tejas Broadcasting to Viva Media, the station's La Caliente format moved to KZIP, and the station began stunting with a series of random formats. On May 1, 2017, the station flipped to a rhythmic-leaning hot adult contemporary format as Wild 104.3, with a focus on current music and recurrent "party hits" from the 1990s and 2000s. Tommy the Hacker moved from KXSS-FM to host the station's new morning show.

On July 31, 2018, KQFX flipped back to a regional Mexican format as La Poderosa 96.1 & 104.3, in simulcast with KBEX. The flip, however, occurred during a live remote by Tommy the Hacker and morning co-host Angel Dee, promoting a sock donation drive at a local Salvation Army branch. The hosts were caught off-guard by the flip, which they were informed of via text messages.
