= KSBJ =

Radio station in Humble–Houston, Texas

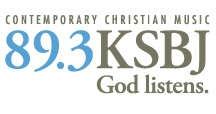
- Humble, Texas; United States
- Broadcast area: Greater Houston
- Frequency: 89.3 MHz (HD Radio)
- Branding: 89.3 KSBJ

Programming
- Languages: English; HD2: Urdu; HD3: Vietnamese; HD4: Thai
- Format: Christian adult contemporary
- Subchannels: HD2: Christian; HD3: Christian; HD4: Christian

Ownership
- Owner: Hope Media Group
- Sister stations: KEHH, KHIH, KXBJ, KHVU, KUBJ, WNVU, WAY-FM Network

History
- First air date: July 8, 1982
- Former frequencies: 88.1 MHz (1982–1987)
- Call sign meaning: "Keep something better Jesus"

Technical information
- Licensing authority: FCC
- Facility ID: 35590
- Class: C1
- ERP: 87,000 watts
- HAAT: 159.6 meters (524 ft)
- Transmitter coordinates: 29°53′15.3″N 95°31′22.5″W
- Translator: KXBJ: 99.1 K256DJ (Victoria)
- Repeaters: 89.7 KUBJ (Brenham); 92.3 KEHH (Livingston); 92.5 KWUP (Navasota); 96.9 KXBJ (El Campo); 99.9 KHIH (Liberty)

Links
- Public license information: Public file; LMS
- Website: ksbj.org

KSBJ (89.3 FM) is a non-commercial radio station licensed to Humble, Texas, United States, broadcasting to the Greater Houston area. Owned and operated by Hope Media Group, formerly KSBJ Educational Foundation, it features a Christian adult contemporary format.

KSBJ is a non-profit ministry supported by listeners and is led by a diverse board of directors from across the greater Houston area. KSBJ can be heard online at KSBJ.org, through the KSBJ app, on 89.3 FM (Greater Houston Area), 96.9 FM (South/West of Houston), 99.9 (Beaumont/Liberty), 92.3 (Livingston), 92.5 (Navasota/College Station), 89.7 (Brenham) and 99.9 (Victoria).

KSBJ Educational Foundation also operates NGEN Radio, which is an online-exclusive Christian hip-hop and pop format, and the Spanish-language Vida Unida Christian AC format, which originates from sister station KHVU.

== History ==
KSBJ's original ownership group, Something Better Educational Foundation, had started as a group protesting the 1979 sale of Christian station KFMK (now KBXX) and its switch from the format. As part of an agreement to drop their protest, the sellers of KFMK helped the group obtain a non-commercial frequency, donated the KFMK music library to them, and assisted with legal, technical and engineering issues.

KSBJ signed on the air July 8, 1982, with Buddy Holiday at the helm. The first song was Dallas Holm's song "Rise Again," both as a sign of a completed blessing (the same song was played as KFMK's final song as a Christian station), and in celebration of God's work continuing in Houston. KSBJ originally operated at 88.1 MHz, but changed frequency to the current 89.3 MHz in 1987, as a part of a frequency switch with then KFTG in Santa Fe.

Over the years, KSBJ has expanded its ministry exponentially. It first acquired low power translators in order to cover more potential listeners in areas outside of the main KSBJ signal range, then acquired full power facilities, beginning with KIOX-FM in El Campo.

On September 1, 2017, KSBJ filed a minor modification to move the signal from its longtime transmission site near Splendora, Texas to its current site in North Houston. The ERP was lowered from the maximum 100 kilowatts to the current 87 kilowatts, as well as a decrease in height above average terrain. While this greatly improved the signal in Houston itself, as well as the immediate suburbs in Harris County, KSBJ was all but lost in areas such as Livingston, Beaumont, and Huntsville, Texas. This was remedied with the purchase of KETX-FM and KSHN during the summer of 2019, returning KSBJ programming to areas lost in the move of the main signal, plus areas that KSBJ had little to no previous reach.

In 2020, KSBJ launched the website Hope on Demand.
