= WayFM Network =

American contemporary Christian music radio network

WayFM
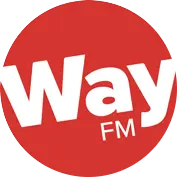
- Type: Radio network
- Country: United States

Programming
- Format: Christian adult contemporary

History
- Launch date: October 9, 1987

Links
- Webcast: Listen Live
- Website: wayfm.com

The WayFM Network is a national, non-profit radio broadcasting network in the United States, primarily playing Christian adult contemporary music. While WayFM is based in Colorado Springs, Colorado, it operates stations in 12 states (as of May 2018), with content creation and programming originating in Franklin, Tennessee.

== History ==
=== Origins in Fort Myers ===
WAY Media, Inc. was founded in 1987 by Bob Augsburg. The non-profit corporation began as a single FM radio station in Fort Myers, Florida.

In the early 1980s, Bob and Felice Augsburg were residing in Fort Myers, where Bob was working as the program director at WSOR, a Christian radio station formatted for older adults. Bob and Felice have said that they "were compelled by the burden to see a younger audience reached and Bob began producing a Saturday evening broadcast geared for youth". This program, which aired on WSOR, became the springboard for Christian rock concerts in the area and the impetus for a 24/7 station with this type of format.

Much discussion with local parents and business people led to a non-profit Florida corporation and an application filed with the Federal Communications Commission (FCC) for an unused FM frequency.

On December 24, 1986, the group received its permit for the construction of a new non-commercial FM station in Fort Myers, WAYJ. On October 9, 1987, WAYJ, broadcasting as "WAY-FM", signed on the air.

=== Growth ===
By 1993, four WAY-FM radio stations were on the air—including Fort Myers; Sarasota, Florida (WAYG); Nashville, Tennessee (WAYM); and West Palm Beach, Florida (WAYF). The Sarasota station never generated sufficient listener support among Sarasota's older population and closed in 1996.

In the mid-1990s, WAY-FM stations, beginning with WAYF in West Palm Beach, began to sponsor and organize large Christian music concerts and day-long music festivals. Within a few years, Nashville and Fort Myers also began to sponsor major Christian music events.

After several years of planning, in 1996, WAY-FM began the Christian Hit Radio Satellite Network (CHRSN). The network was designed to help other stations who desired to reach the youth and young adults of their respective communities but lacked the manpower or resources to operate a station on their own. On August 27, 1996, WAY-FM also launched its official website, complete with downloadable singles and music videos.

=== Corporate office established ===
In 2001, WAY-FM Media Group established a corporate office in Colorado Springs, Colorado, where Bob Augsburg, the president and founder now lives. Dusty Rhodes, former station manager of WAYF, joined Augsburg in Colorado as chief operating officer and is now the ministry's senior vice president.

In 2005, Dar Ringling joined the ministry as chief financial officer while Lloyd Parker, formerly general manager of the K-Love and Air1 radio networks, became the chief operating officer.

In 2012, WAY-FM shifted from its long time Christian CHR format to a Christian adult contemporary format, along with shifting their audience from 18- to 34-year-olds, to older adults (25–54), thus growing up with its original audience more or less. Since 2013 WAY-FM, via flagship station WAYM in Nashville, is a Christian AC reporter to the Nielsen BDS service, and became a monitored reporter to Mediabase's Christian AC panel in April 2015.

In July 2013, WAY-FM ceased providing programming to non-owned stations via satellite, with the exception of the network morning show, The Wally Show. In 2017, The Wally Show also left syndication.

In May 2015, WAY-FM announced plans to acquire KVRK in North Texas. The station's call letters were changed to KAWA, and it now broadcasts the national WAY-FM format. Its former Power FM programming became an online music channel, app, and community of Christian rock fans managed by WAY-FM Media Group.

=== New CEO ===
In August 2017, founder Bob Augsburg officially retired from his position as CEO. Bob remains on the board of directors and is still involved in the ministry. John Scaggs was chosen as the new CEO.

=== Merger with Hope Media Group ===
On January 26, 2022; it was announced that Way Media Group would merge with Hope Media Group based out of Houston, Texas. Hope Media Group owns and operates heritage Christian AC station KSBJ 89.3, and Spanish Christian AC sister KHVU 91.7 (Vida Unida), along with internet radio station NGEN Radio which features a pop and hip-hop leaning Christian CHR format.

== Current reach ==
At this time, WAY-FM owns and operates 23 full power FM radio stations. WAY-FM also owns 38 translator stations. WAY-FM is also heard online and offers two online exclusive streams. NGEN radio streaming Christian pop and hip-hop and Way Loud streaming Christian active/alternative rock.

== Station list ==
=== Alabama ===
Call sign	Frequency	City of license	FID	ERP (W)	HAAT	Class	FCC info
WAYU	91.1 FM	Steele, Alabama	173825	150	230 m (755 ft)	A	LMS
WAYH	88.1 FM	Harvest, Alabama	61509	3,500	204 m (669 ft)	C3	LMS
W297AP	107.3 FM	Anniston, Alabama	141192	10	222 m (728 ft)	D	LMS
W220ED	91.9 FM	Auburn, Alabama	148356	19	49 m (161 ft)	D	LMS
W210CA	89.9 FM	Birmingham, Alabama	141129	10	349.1 m (1,145 ft)	D	LMS
W258AE	99.5 FM	Florence, Alabama	58436	27	73.4 m (241 ft)	D	LMS
W256CD	99.1 FM	Fultondale, Alabama	153894	130	0 m (0 ft)	D	LMS
W258AU	99.5 FM	Huntsville, Alabama	141160	120	387 m (1,270 ft)	D	LMS
W259BS	99.7 FM	Montgomery, Alabama	141115	10	0 m (0 ft)	D	LMS
W272CO	102.3 FM	Montgomery, Alabama	90253	250	192 m (630 ft)	D	LMS
W292EI	106.3 FM	Warrior, Alabama	141132	250	0 m (0 ft)	D	LMS

=== California ===
Call sign	Frequency	City of license	FID	ERP (W)	HAAT	Class	FCC info
KDMV	96.5 FM	Citrus Heights, California	96349	750	567 m (1,860 ft)	A	LMS
KVXN	102.9 FM	Sacramento, California	131561	1,700	84.4 m (277 ft)	C3	LMS

=== Colorado ===
Call sign	Frequency	City of license	FID	ERP (W)	HAAT	Class	FCC info
KBWA	89.1 FM	Brush, Colorado	91420	1,500	44.2 m (145 ft)	A	LMS
KXWA	101.9 FM	Centennial, Colorado	70822	9,500	163 m (535 ft)	C3	LMS
KCWA	93.9 FM	Loveland, Colorado	9761	580	319 m (1,047 ft)	A	LMS
KRWA	90.9 FM	Rye, Colorado	87409	10,000	34.6 m (114 ft)	C3	LMS
KJWA	89.7 FM	Trinidad, Colorado	87410	160	241 m (791 ft)	A	LMS
KFWA	103.1 FM	Weldona, Colorado	79249	6,800	46.3 m (152 ft)	C3	LMS
K257FO	99.3 FM	Colorado Springs, Colorado	140178	72	651 m (2,136 ft)	D	LMS
K230BO	93.9 FM	Monument, Colorado	140364	250	148 m (486 ft)	D	LMS
K299AO	107.7 FM	Sterling, Colorado	139945	75	110.4 m (362 ft)	D	LMS

=== Florida ===
Call sign	Frequency	City of license	FID	ERP (W)	HAAT	Class	FCC info
WAYP	88.3 FM	Marianna, Florida	40082	70,000	105 m (344 ft)	C1	LMS
WAYJ	89.5 FM	Naples, Florida	59831	100,000	94.1 m (309 ft)	C1	LMS
WAYF	88.1 FM	West Palm Beach, Florida	61507	50,000	321 m (1,053 ft)	C1	LMS
W263BI	100.5 FM	Fort Myers, Florida	143063	250	320.8 m (1,052 ft)	D	LMS
W295DC	106.9 FM	Panama City, Florida	140054	15	11 m (36 ft)	D	LMS
W258BC	99.5 FM	Perkins, Florida	144622	250	93.2 m (306 ft)	D	LMS
W244BD	96.7 FM	Stuart, Florida	85974	800	42 m (138 ft)	D	LMS
W239CG	95.7 FM	Tallahassee, Florida	144620	10	0 m (0 ft)	D	LMS
W212CG	90.3 FM	West Palm Beach, Florida	123364	250	0 m (0 ft)	D	LMS

=== Georgia ===
Call sign	Frequency	City of license	FID	ERP (W)	HAAT	Class	FCC info
WAYT	88.1 FM	Thomasville, Georgia	61193	17,000	392 m (1,286 ft)	C1	LMS
W212AR	90.3 FM	Lindale, Georgia	64263	10	217 m (712 ft)	D	LMS

=== Indiana ===
Call sign	Frequency	City of license	FID	ERP (W)	HAAT	Class	FCC info
WAYI	104.3 FM	Charlestown, Indiana	76595	3,000	100 m (328 ft)	A	LMS
WJWA	91.5 FM	Evansville, Indiana	69106	6,100	151 m (495 ft)	B1	LMS
W220DV	91.9 FM	Evansville, Indiana	141109	250	248.2 m (814 ft)	D	LMS
W261CW	100.1 FM	Evansville, Indiana	141110	43	0 m (0 ft)	D	LMS

=== Kansas ===
Call sign	Frequency	City of license	FID	ERP (W)	HAAT	Class	FCC info
KYWA	90.7 FM	Wichita, Kansas	48537	53,000	144 m (472 ft)	C1	LMS

=== Kentucky ===
Call sign	Frequency	City of license	FID	ERP (W)	HAAT	Class	FCC info
WAYD	88.1 FM	Auburn, Kentucky	93017	1,000	113 m (371 ft)	A	LMS
WAYK	105.9 FM	Valley Station, Kentucky	50764	1,250	155 m (509 ft)	A	LMS
W212BZ	90.3 FM	Brentwood, Kentucky	140468	19	87.2 m (286 ft)	D	LMS
W201DD	88.1 FM	Central City, Kentucky	147296	27	58.9 m (193 ft)	D	LMS
W221EU	91.5 FM	Central City, Kentucky	141101	120	0 m (0 ft)	D	LMS
W291BZ	106.1 FM	Murray, Kentucky	142671	27	81.4 m (267 ft)	D	LMS
W217BP	91.3 FM	Owensboro, Kentucky	140460	15	87.4 m (287 ft)	D	LMS

=== Oregon ===
Call sign	Frequency	City of license	FID	ERP (W)	HAAT	Class	FCC info
KKWA	96.3 FM	West Linn, Oregon	13581	1,350	386 m (1,266 ft)	C3	LMS

=== South Carolina ===
Call sign	Frequency	City of license	FID	ERP (W)	HAAT	Class	FCC info
WAYA-FM	100.9 FM	Ridgeville, South Carolina	25374	13,000	91 m (299 ft)	C3	LMS
W267BK	101.3 FM	Mount Pleasant, South Carolina	149547	250	201.5 m (661 ft)	D	LMS

=== Tennessee ===
Call sign	Frequency	City of license	FID	ERP (W)	HAAT	Class	FCC info
WAYQ	88.3 FM	Clarksville, Tennessee	83853	14,000	227 m (745 ft)	C2	LMS
WAYW	89.9 FM	New Johnsonville, Tennessee	91932	500	97 m (318 ft)	A	LMS
WAYM	88.7 FM	Spring Hill, Tennessee	58421	5,000	330 m (1,083 ft)	C2	LMS
W215BH	90.9 FM	Chattanooga, Tennessee	94111	10	361 m (1,184 ft)	D	LMS
W284AE	104.7 FM	Chattanooga, Tennessee	58443	250	219 m (719 ft)	D	LMS
W207CI	89.3 FM	Cleveland, Tennessee	58444	13	123.1 m (404 ft)	D	LMS
W257BX	99.3 FM	Columbia, Tennessee	140706	60	54.4 m (178 ft)	D	LMS
W213BT	90.5 FM	Cookeville, Tennessee	64257	10	134.5 m (441 ft)	D	LMS
W210CD	89.9 FM	Hendersonville, Tennessee	64258	250	316 m (1,037 ft)	D	LMS
W207CQ	89.3 FM	Jackson, Tennessee	140689	10	108 m (354 ft)	D	LMS

=== Texas ===
Call sign	Frequency	City of license	FID	ERP (W)	HAAT	Class	FCC info
KAWA	89.7 FM	Sanger, Texas	76285	95,000	572 m (1,877 ft)	C	LMS

=== Washington ===
Call sign	Frequency	City of license	FID	ERP (W)	HAAT	Class	FCC info
K218FL	91.5 FM	Spokane, Washington	106445	26	0 m (0 ft)	D	LMS
K235CU	94.9 FM	Longview, Washington	140432	20	0 m (0 ft)	D	LMS
