= List of FM radio stations in the United States by call sign (initial letters KA–KC) =

This is a list of FM radio stations in the United States having call signs beginning with the letters KA through KC. Low-power FM radio stations, those with designations such as KAAD-LP, have not been included in this list.

== KA-- ==
| Callsign | Frequency | City of license |
|---|---|---|
| KAAC | 99.7 FM | Utqiavik, Alaska |
| KAAI | 98.5 FM | Palisade, Colorado |
| KAAK | 98.9 FM | Great Falls, Montana |
| KAAN-FM | 95.5 FM | Bethany, Missouri |
| KAAQ | 105.9 FM | Alliance, Nebraska |
| KAAR | 92.5 FM | Butte, Montana |
| KAAT | 103.1 FM | Oakhurst, California |
| KAAZ-FM | 106.7 FM | Spanish Fork, Utah |
| KABA | 90.3 FM | Louise, Texas |
| KABD | 107.7 FM | Ipswich, South Dakota |
| KABF | 88.3 FM | Little Rock, Arkansas |
| KABG | 98.5 FM | Los Alamos, New Mexico |
| KABQ-FM | 95.1 FM | Corrales, New Mexico |
| KABR | 107.5 FM | Alamo Community, New Mexico |
| KABU | 90.7 FM | Fort Totten, North Dakota |
| KABW | 95.1 FM | Baird, Texas |
| KABX-FM | 97.5 FM | Merced, California |
| KABZ | 103.7 FM | Little Rock, Arkansas |
| KACC | 89.7 FM | Alvin, Texas |
| KACE | 98.3 FM | Beatty, Nevada |
| KACG | 100.3 FM | Goldfield, Nevada |
| KACI-FM | 93.5 FM | The Dalles, Oregon |
| KACL | 98.7 FM | Bismarck, North Dakota |
| KACO | 98.5 FM | Apache, Oklahoma |
| KACP | 103.1 FM | Pahrump, Nevada |
| KACQ | 101.9 FM | Lometa, Texas |
| KACS | 90.5 FM | Chehalis, Washington |
| KACT-FM | 105.5 FM | Andrews, Texas |
| KACU | 89.5 FM | Abilene, Texas |
| KACV-FM | 89.9 FM | Amarillo, Texas |
| KACW | 91.3 FM | South Bend, Washington |
| KACY | 102.5 FM | Arkansas City, Kansas |
| KACZ | 96.3 FM | Riley, Kansas |
| KADA-FM | 99.3 FM | Ada, Oklahoma |
| KADD | 93.5 FM | Logandale, Nevada |
| KADI-FM | 99.5 FM | Republic, Missouri |
| KADL | 102.9 FM | Imperial, Nebraska |
| KADQ-FM | 98.3 FM | Evanston, Wyoming |
| KADU | 90.1 FM | Hibbing, Minnesota |
| KADV | 89.1 FM | Garberville, California |
| KAEB | 91.9 FM | Sand Point, Alaska |
| KAEH | 100.9 FM | Beaumont, California |
| KAER | 89.3 FM | Mesquite, Nevada |
| KAFC | 93.7 FM | Anchorage, Alaska |
| KAFE | 104.3 FM | Bellingham, Washington |
| KAFF-FM | 92.9 FM | Flagstaff, Arizona |
| KAFH | 91.5 FM | Great Falls, Montana |
| KAFM | 88.1 FM | Grand Junction, Colorado |
| KAFR | 88.3 FM | Willis, Texas |
| KAFX-FM | 95.5 FM | Diboll, Texas |
| KAFZ | 99.7 FM | Ash Fork, Arizona |
| KAGB | 99.1 FM | Waimea, Hawaii |
| KAGG | 96.1 FM | Madisonville, Texas |
| KAGH-FM | 104.9 FM | Crossett, Arkansas |
| KAGJ | 88.9 FM | Ephraim, Utah |
| KAGL | 93.3 FM | El Dorado, Arkansas |
| KAGO-FM | 94.9 FM | Altamont, Oregon |
| KAGP | 89.1 FM | Greenwood, Texas |
| KAGT | 90.5 FM | Abilene, Texas |
| KAGU | 88.7 FM | Spokane, Washington |
| KAHE | 95.5 FM | Dodge City, Kansas |
| KAHL-FM | 105.9 FM | Hondo, Texas |
| KAHM | 102.1 FM | Prescott, Arizona |
| KAHR | 96.7 FM | Poplar Bluff, Missouri |
| KAHU | 91.3 FM | Pahala, Hawaii |
| KAIB | 89.5 FM | Shafter, California |
| KAIC | 88.9 FM | Tucson, Arizona |
| KAIG | 89.9 FM | Dodge City, Kansas |
| KAIH | 89.3 FM | Lake Havasu City, Arizona |
| KAIK | 88.5 FM | Rockaway Beach, Oregon |
| KAIM-FM | 95.5 FM | Honolulu, Hawaii |
| KAIO | 90.5 FM | Idaho Falls, Idaho |
| KAIP | 88.9 FM | Wapello, Iowa |
| KAIQ | 95.5 FM | Wolfforth, Texas |
| KAIR-FM | 93.7 FM | Horton, Kansas |
| KAIS | 90.3 FM | Salem, Oregon |
| KAIV | 92.7 FM | Thousand Oaks, California |
| KAIW | 88.9 FM | Saratoga, Wyoming |
| KAIX | 88.3 FM | Casper, Wyoming |
| KAIZ | 105.5 FM | Avondale, Arizona |
| KAJA | 97.3 FM | San Antonio, Texas |
| KAJC | 90.1 FM | Salem, Oregon |
| KAJE | 107.3 FM | Ingleside, Texas |
| KAJK | 96.3 FM | Susanville, California |
| KAJM | 104.3 FM | Camp Verde, Arizona |
| KAJN-FM | 102.9 FM | Crowley, Louisiana |
| KAJT | 88.7 FM | Ada, Oklahoma |
| KAJX | 91.5 FM | Aspen, Colorado |
| KAKA | 88.5 FM | Salina, Kansas |
| KAKD | 104.9 FM | Dillingham, Alaska |
| KAKI | 88.1 FM | Juneau, Alaska |
| KAKJ | 105.3 FM | Marianna, Arkansas |
| KAKL | 88.5 FM | Anchorage, Alaska |
| KAKN | 100.9 FM | Naknek, Alaska |
| KAKO | 91.3 FM | Ada, Oklahoma |
| KAKP | 101.3 FM | Pasco, Washington |
| KAKQ-FM | 101.1 FM | Fairbanks, Alaska |
| KAKR | 103.7 FM | Akron, Colorado |
| KAKS | 99.5 FM | Goshen, Arkansas |
| KAKT | 105.1 FM | Phoenix, Oregon |
| KAKV | 88.9 FM | El Dorado, Arkansas |
| KAKX | 89.3 FM | Mendocino, California |
| KALA | 88.5 FM | Davenport, Iowa |
| KALC | 105.9 FM | Denver, Colorado |
| KALD | 91.9 FM | Caldwell, Texas |
| KALF | 95.7 FM | Red Bluff, California |
| KALG | 98.1 FM | Kaltag, Alaska |
| KALI-FM | 106.3 FM | Santa Ana, California |
| KALK | 97.7 FM | Winfield, Texas |
| KALN | 102.5 FM | Dexter, New Mexico |
| KALP | 92.7 FM | Alpine, Texas |
| KALQ-FM | 93.5 FM | Alamosa, Colorado |
| KALR | 91.5 FM | Hot Springs, Arkansas |
| KALS | 97.1 FM | Kalispell, Montana |
| KALT-FM | 106.5 FM | Alturas, California |
| KALU | 89.3 FM | Langston, Oklahoma |
| KALV-FM | 101.5 FM | Phoenix, Arizona |
| KALW | 91.7 FM | San Francisco, California |
| KALX | 90.7 FM | Berkeley, California |
| KALZ | 96.7 FM | Fowler, California |
| KAMA-FM | 104.9 FM | Deer Park, Texas |
| KAMB | 101.5 FM | Merced, California |
| KAMC-FM | 90.7 FM | Soldotna, Alaska |
| KAMD-FM | 97.1 FM | Camden, Arkansas |
| KAMJ | 93.9 FM | Gosnell, Arkansas |
| KAML-FM | 97.3 FM | Gillette, Wyoming |
| KAMO-FM | 94.3 FM | Rogers, Arkansas |
| KAMS | 95.1 FM | Mammoth Spring, Arkansas |
| KAMT | 105.1 FM | Channing, Texas |
| KAMU-FM | 90.9 FM | College Station, Texas |
| KAMV | 107.1 FM | Benbrook, Texas |
| KAMX | 94.7 FM | Luling, Texas |
| KAMY | 90.1 FM | Lubbock, Texas |
| KAMZ | 103.5 FM | Tahoka, Texas |
| KANH | 89.7 FM | Emporia, Kansas |
| KANJ | 91.1 FM | Giddings, Texas |
| KANL | 90.7 FM | Baker, Oregon |
| KANM | 90.3 FM | Grants, New Mexico |
| KANO | 89.1 FM | Hilo, Hawaii |
| KANP | 91.3 FM | Ashton, Idaho |
| KANQ | 90.3 FM | Chanute, Kansas |
| KANR | 91.9 FM | Santa Rosa, New Mexico |
| KANS | 96.1 FM | Emporia, Kansas |
| KANT | 104.1 FM | Guernsey, Wyoming |
| KANU | 91.5 FM | Lawrence, Kansas |
| KANV | 91.3 FM | Olsburg, Kansas |
| KANW | 89.1 FM | Albuquerque, New Mexico |
| KANX | 91.1 FM | Sheridan, Arkansas |
| KANY | 107.3 FM | Cosmopolis, Washington |
| KANZ | 91.1 FM | Garden City, Kansas |
| KAOC | 105.1 FM | Cavalier, North Dakota |
| KAOG | 90.5 FM | Jonesboro, Arkansas |
| KAOI-FM | 95.1 FM | Wailuku, Hawaii |
| KAOR | 91.1 FM | Vermillion, South Dakota |
| KAOS | 89.3 FM | Olympia, Washington |
| KAOW | 88.9 FM | Fort Smith, Arkansas |
| KAOX | 107.9 FM | Shelley, Idaho |
| KAOY | 101.5 FM | Kealakekua, Hawaii |
| KAPA | 100.3 FM | Hilo, Hawaii |
| KAPB-FM | 97.7 FM | Marksville, Louisiana |
| KAPC | 91.3 FM | Butte, Montana |
| KAPI | 88.3 FM | Ruston, Louisiana |
| KAPL-FM | 99.5 FM | Rock Island, Washington |
| KAPM | 91.7 FM | Alexandria, Louisiana |
| KAPN | 107.3 FM | Caldwell, Texas |
| KAPW | 99.3 FM | White Oak, Texas |
| KAQA | 91.9 FM | Kilauea, Hawaii |
| KAQD | 91.3 FM | Abilene, Texas |
| KAQF | 91.1 FM | Clovis, New Mexico |
| KARA | 99.1 FM | Williams, California |
| KARB | 98.3 FM | Price, Utah |
| KARF | 91.9 FM | Independence, Kansas |
| KARG | 91.7 FM | Poteau, Oklahoma |
| KARH | 104.3 FM | Fouke, Arkansas |
| KARJ | 92.1 FM | Escondido, California |
| KARL | 105.1 FM | Tracy, Minnesota |
| KARM | 89.7 FM | Visalia, California |
| KARN-FM | 102.9 FM | Sheridan, Arkansas |
| KARO | 98.7 FM | Nyssa, Oregon |
| KARP-FM | 106.9 FM | Dassel, Minnesota |
| KARQ | 88.5 FM | San Luis Obispo, California |
| KARS-FM | 102.9 FM | Laramie, Wyoming |
| KARU | 88.9 FM | Cache, Oklahoma |
| KARV-FM | 101.3 FM | Ola, Arkansas |
| KARW | 97.9 FM | Salinas, California |
| KARX | 107.1 FM | Canyon, Texas |
| KARY-FM | 100.9 FM | Grandview, Washington |
| KARZ | 94.7 FM | Springfield, Minnesota |
| KASB | 89.9 FM | Bellevue, Washington |
| KASD | 90.3 FM | Rapid City, South Dakota |
| KASE-FM | 100.7 FM | Austin, Texas |
| KASF | 90.9 FM | Alamosa, Colorado |
| KASH-FM | 107.5 FM | Anchorage, Alaska |
| KASK | 91.5 FM | Fairfield, California |
| KASR | 99.3 FM | Atkins, Arkansas |
| KASS | 106.9 FM | Casper, Wyoming |
| KASU | 91.9 FM | Jonesboro, Arkansas |
| KATB | 89.3 FM | Anchorage, Alaska |
| KATC-FM | 95.1 FM | Colorado Springs, Colorado |
| KATF | 92.9 FM | Dubuque, Iowa |
| KATG | 88.1 FM | Elkhart, Texas |
| KATI | 94.3 FM | California, Missouri |
| KATJ-FM | 100.7 FM | Victorville, California |
| KATK-FM | 92.1 FM | Carlsbad, New Mexico |
| KATM | 103.3 FM | Modesto, California |
| KATO-FM | 93.1 FM | New Ulm, Minnesota |
| KATP | 101.9 FM | Amarillo, Texas |
| KATQ-FM | 100.1 FM | Plentywood, Montana |
| KATR-FM | 98.3 FM | Otis, Colorado |
| KATS | 94.5 FM | Yakima, Washington |
| KATT | 100.5 FM | Oklahoma City, Oklahoma |
| KATW | 101.5 FM | Lewiston, Idaho |
| KATX | 97.7 FM | Eastland, Texas |
| KATY-FM | 101.3 FM | Riverside, California |
| KATZ-FM | 100.3 FM | Bridgeton, Missouri |
| KAUC | 89.7 FM | West Clarkston, Washington |
| KAUD | 90.5 FM | Mexico, Missouri |
| KAUF | 89.9 FM | Kennett, Missouri |
| KAUJ | 100.9 FM | Grafton, North Dakota |
| KAUK | 91.7 FM | Juneau, Alaska |
| KAUM | 107.1 FM | Colorado City, Texas |
| KAUR | 89.1 FM | Sioux Falls, South Dakota |
| KAUS-FM | 99.9 FM | Austin, Minnesota |
| KAVB | 98.7 FM | Hawthorne, Nevada |
| KAVE | 88.5 FM | Oakridge, Oregon |
| KAVK | 89.3 FM | Many, Louisiana |
| KAVM | 105.1 FM | Cold Bay, Alaska |
| KAVO | 90.9 FM | Pampa, Texas |
| KAVW | 90.7 FM | Amarillo, Texas |
| KAVX | 91.9 FM | Lufkin, Texas |
| KAVY | 89.1 FM | McCall, Idaho |
| KAWA | 89.7 FM | Sanger, Texas |
| KAWC-FM | 88.9 FM | Yuma, Arizona |
| KAWF | 88.5 FM | Selma, California |
| KAWJ | 94.5 FM | Coarsegold, California |
| KAWK | 88.3 FM | Coalinga, California |
| KAWN | 91.3 FM | Winslow, Arizona |
| KAWO | 104.3 FM | Boise, Idaho |
| KAWP | 88.9 FM | Parker, Arizona |
| KAWR | 98.7 FM | Reliance, Wyoming |
| KAWS | 89.1 FM | Marsing–Murphy, Idaho |
| KAWV | 88.3 FM | Alice, Texas |
| KAWX | 89.3 FM | Mena, Arkansas |
| KAWZ | 89.9 FM | Twin Falls, Idaho |
| KAXA | 103.7 FM | Mountain Home, Texas |
| KAXE | 91.7 FM | Grand Rapids, Minnesota |
| KAXG | 89.7 FM | Gillette, Wyoming |
| KAXL | 88.3 FM | Greenacres, California |
| KAXM | 90.1 FM | Nacogdoches, Texas |
| KAXR | 91.3 FM | Arkansas City, Kansas |
| KAXV | 91.9 FM | Bastrop, Louisiana |
| KAYA | 91.3 FM | Hubbard, Nebraska |
| KAYB | 88.1 FM | Sunnyside, Washington |
| KAYC | 91.1 FM | Durant, Oklahoma |
| KAYD-FM | 101.7 FM | Silsbee, Texas |
| KAYE-FM | 90.7 FM | Tonkawa, Oklahoma |
| KAYH | 89.3 FM | Fayetteville, Arkansas |
| KAYK | 88.5 FM | Victoria, Texas |
| KAYL-FM | 101.7 FM | Storm Lake, Iowa |
| KAYM | 90.5 FM | Weatherford, Oklahoma |
| KAYO | 100.9 FM | Wasilla, Alaska |
| KAYP | 89.9 FM | Burlington, Iowa |
| KAYQ | 97.1 FM | Warsaw, Missouri |
| KAYT | 88.1 FM | Jena, Louisiana |
| KAYV | 97.1 FM | Crested Butte, Colorado |
| KAYW | 98.1 FM | Meeker, Colorado |
| KAYX | 92.5 FM | Richmond, Missouri |
| KAZC | 89.3 FM | Dickson, Oklahoma |
| KAZE | 106.9 FM | Ore City, Texas |
| KAZI | 88.7 FM | Austin, Texas |
| KAZK | 89.7 FM | Willcox, Arizona |
| KAZR | 103.3 FM | Pella, Iowa |
| KAZU | 90.3 FM | Pacific Grove, California |
| KAZY | 93.7 FM | Cheyenne, Wyoming |

== KB-- ==
| Callsign | Frequency | City of license |
|---|---|---|
| KBAA | 103.3 FM | Grass Valley, California |
| KBAC | 98.1 FM | Las Vegas, New Mexico |
| KBAH | 90.5 FM | Plainview, Texas |
| KBAI | 91.5 FM | Bloomfield, Missouri |
| KBAJ | 105.5 FM | Deer River, Minnesota |
| KBAN | 91.5 FM | De Ridder, Louisiana |
| KBAP | 88.1 FM | Batesville, Arkansas |
| KBAQ | 89.5 FM | Phoenix, Arizona |
| KBAR-FM | 100.9 FM | Victoria, Texas |
| KBAT | 99.9 FM | Monahans, Texas |
| KBAY | 94.5 FM | Gilroy, California |
| KBAZ | 96.3 FM | Hamilton, Montana |
| KBBB | 102.5 FM | Bay City, Texas |
| KBBC | 99.7 FM | Tishomingo, Oklahoma |
| KBBD | 103.9 FM | Spokane, Washington |
| KBBF | 89.1 FM | Calistoga, California |
| KBBG | 88.1 FM | Waterloo, Iowa |
| KBBK | 107.3 FM | Lincoln, Nebraska |
| KBBL | 106.3 FM | Cazadero, California |
| KBBM | 100.1 FM | Jefferson City, Missouri |
| KBBN-FM | 95.3 FM | Broken Bow, Nebraska |
| KBBO-FM | 92.1 FM | Houston, Alaska |
| KBBQ-FM | 102.7 FM | Van Buren, Arkansas |
| KBBT | 98.5 FM | Schertz, Texas |
| KBBU | 93.9 FM | Modesto, California |
| KBBX-FM | 97.7 FM | Nebraska City, Nebraska |
| KBBY-FM | 95.1 FM | Ventura, California |
| KBBZ | 98.5 FM | Kalispell, Montana |
| KBCE | 102.3 FM | Boyce, Louisiana |
| KBCK | 95.9 FM | Columbia Falls, Montana |
| KBCM | 88.3 FM | Blytheville, Arkansas |
| KBCN-FM | 104.3 FM | Marshall, Arkansas |
| KBCO | 97.3 FM | Boulder, Colorado |
| KBCQ-FM | 97.1 FM | Roswell, New Mexico |
| KBCR-FM | 96.9 FM | Steamboat Springs, Colorado |
| KBCS | 91.3 FM | Bellevue, Washington |
| KBCU | 88.1 FM | North Newton, Kansas |
| KBCX | 91.5 FM | Big Spring, Texas |
| KBCY | 99.7 FM | Tye, Texas |
| KBCZ | 89.3 FM | Boulder Creek, California |
| KBDA | 89.7 FM | Great Bend, Kansas |
| KBDB-FM | 96.7 FM | Forks, Washington |
| KBDC | 88.5 FM | Mason City, Iowa |
| KBDD | 91.9 FM | Winfield, Kansas |
| KBDE | 89.9 FM | Temple, Texas |
| KBDG | 90.9 FM | Turlock, California |
| KBDN | 96.5 FM | Bandon, Oregon |
| KBDO | 91.7 FM | Des Arc, Arkansas |
| KBDR | 100.5 FM | Mirando City, Texas |
| KBDS | 103.9 FM | Taft, California |
| KBDV | 92.7 FM | Leesville, Louisiana |
| KBDX | 92.7 FM | Blanding, Utah |
| KBDY | 102.1 FM | Hanna, Wyoming |
| KBDZ | 93.1 FM | Perryville, Missouri |
| KBEA-FM | 99.7 FM | Muscatine, Iowa |
| KBEB | 92.5 FM | Sacramento, California |
| KBEE | 98.7 FM | Salt Lake City, Utah |
| KBEF | 104.5 FM | Gibsland, Louisiana |
| KBEI | 90.5 FM | Brush, Colorado |
| KBEK | 95.5 FM | Mora, Minnesota |
| KBEL-FM | 96.7 FM | Idabel, Oklahoma |
| KBEM-FM | 88.5 FM | Minneapolis, Minnesota |
| KBEN-FM | 103.3 FM | Cowley, Wyoming |
| KBEQ-FM | 104.3 FM | Kansas City, Missouri |
| KBER | 101.1 FM | Ogden, Utah |
| KBES | 89.5 FM | Ceres, California |
| KBEU | 92.7 FM | Bearden, Arkansas |
| KBEV-FM | 98.3 FM | Dillon, Montana |
| KBEW-FM | 98.1 FM | Blue Earth, Minnesota |
| KBEX | 96.1 FM | Dalhart, Texas |
| KBEY | 103.9 FM | Burnet, Texas |
| KBFB | 97.9 FM | Dallas, Texas |
| KBFC | 93.5 FM | Forrest City, Arkansas |
| KBFF | 95.5 FM | Portland, Oregon |
| KBFM | 104.1 FM | Edinburg, Texas |
| KBFO | 106.7 FM | Aberdeen, South Dakota |
| KBFP-FM | 105.3 FM | Delano, California |
| KBFT | 89.9 FM | Nett Lake, Minnesota |
| KBFX | 100.5 FM | Anchorage, Alaska |
| KBGA | 89.9 FM | Missoula, Montana |
| KBGB | 105.7 FM | Magness, Arkansas |
| KBGE | 94.9 FM | Cannon Beach, Oregon |
| KBGL | 106.9 FM | Larned, Kansas |
| KBGM | 91.1 FM | Park Hills, Missouri |
| KBGO | 95.7 FM | Waco, Texas |
| KBGT | 93.3 FM | Buffalo Gap, Texas |
| KBGX | 105.3 FM | Keaau, Hawaii |
| KBGY | 107.5 FM | Faribault, Minnesota |
| KBGZ | 103.9 FM | Spring Creek, Nevada |
| KBHE-FM | 89.3 FM | Rapid City, South Dakota |
| KBHH | 95.3 FM | Kerman, California |
| KBHI | 107.1 FM | Miner, Missouri |
| KBHJ | 97.3 FM | Blythe, California |
| KBHL | 103.9 FM | Osakis, Minnesota |
| KBHN | 89.7 FM | Booneville, Arkansas |
| KBHP | 101.1 FM | Bemidji, Minnesota |
| KBHR | 93.3 FM | Big Bear City, California |
| KBHU-FM | 89.1 FM | Spearfish, South Dakota |
| KBHW | 99.5 FM | International Falls, Minnesota |
| KBHZ | 91.9 FM | Willmar, Minnesota |
| KBIA | 91.3 FM | Columbia, Missouri |
| KBIC | 105.7 FM | Raymondville, Texas |
| KBIE | 103.1 FM | Auburn, Nebraska |
| KBIG | 104.3 FM | Los Angeles |
| KBIJ | 99.5 FM | Guymon, Oklahoma |
| KBIK | 102.9 FM | Independence, Kansas |
| KBIL | 89.7 FM | Park City, Montana |
| KBIM-FM | 94.9 FM | Roswell, New Mexico |
| KBIO | 89.7 FM | Natchitoches, Louisiana |
| KBIQ | 102.7 FM | Manitou Springs, Colorado |
| KBIU | 103.3 FM | Lake Charles, Louisiana |
| KBJF | 90.5 FM | Nephi, Utah |
| KBJQ | 88.3 FM | Bronson, Kansas |
| KBJS | 90.3 FM | Jacksonville, Texas |
| KBJX | 103.5 FM | Mertzon, Texas |
| KBKB-FM | 101.7 FM | Fort Madison, Iowa |
| KBKC | 90.1 FM | Moberly, Missouri |
| KBKG | 93.5 FM | Corning, Arkansas |
| KBKK | 105.5 FM | Ball, Louisiana |
| KBKL | 107.9 FM | Grand Junction, Colorado |
| KBKN | 91.3 FM | Lamesa, Texas |
| KBKO | 88.3 FM | Kodiak, Alaska |
| KBKR-FM | 95.3 FM | Baker, Oregon |
| KBKS-FM | 106.1 FM | Tacoma, Washington |
| KBKV | 88.7 FM | Breckenridge, Colorado |
| KBKY | 94.1 FM | Merced, California |
| KBKZ | 96.5 FM | Raton, New Mexico |
| KBLB | 93.3 FM | Nisswa, Minnesota |
| KBLC | 91.5 FM | Fredericksburg, Texas |
| KBLD | 91.7 FM | Kennewick, Washington |
| KBLL | 99.5 FM | Helena, Montana |
| KBLO | 102.3 FM | Corcoran, California |
| KBLP | 105.1 FM | Lindsay, Oklahoma |
| KBLQ-FM | 92.9 FM | Logan, Utah |
| KBLS | 102.5 FM | Fort Riley North, Kansas |
| KBLV | 88.7 FM | Tehachapi, California |
| KBLW | 90.1 FM | Billings, Montana |
| KBLX-FM | 102.9 FM | Berkeley, California |
| KBLY | 100.5 FM | Newcastle, Texas |
| KBLZ | 102.7 FM | Winona, Texas |
| KBMC | 102.1 FM | Bozeman, Montana |
| KBMD | 88.5 FM | Marble Falls, Texas |
| KBMG | 106.3 FM | Evanston, Wyoming |
| KBMH | 90.3 FM | Holbrook, Arizona |
| KBMJ | 89.5 FM | Heber Springs, Arkansas |
| KBMK | 88.3 FM | Bismarck, North Dakota |
| KBMM | 89.5 FM | Odessa, Texas |
| KBMP | 90.5 FM | Enterprise, Kansas |
| KBMQ | 88.7 FM | Monroe, Louisiana |
| KBMV-FM | 107.1 FM | Birch Tree, Missouri |
| KBMW-FM | 92.7 FM | Breckenridge, Minnesota |
| KBMX | 107.7 FM | Proctor, Minnesota |
| KBNA-FM | 97.5 FM | El Paso, Texas |
| KBNJ | 91.7 FM | Corpus Christi, Texas |
| KBNL | 89.9 FM | Laredo, Texas |
| KBNR | 88.3 FM | Brownsville, Texas |
| KBNU | 93.9 FM | Uvalde, Texas |
| KBNV | 90.1 FM | Fayetteville, Arkansas |
| KBNW-FM | 107.1 FM | Deer Park, Washington |
| KBNX | 97.9 FM | Bangs, Texas |
| KBOA-FM | 105.5 FM | Piggott, Arkansas |
| KBOB-FM | 97.1 FM | Haven, Kansas |
| KBOC | 98.3 FM | Bridgeport, Texas |
| KBOD | 99.7 FM | Gainesville, Missouri |
| KBOE-FM | 104.9 FM | Oskaloosa, Iowa |
| KBOI-FM | 93.1 FM | New Plymouth, Idaho |
| KBOM | 88.7 FM | Socorro, New Mexico |
| KBON | 101.1 FM | Mamou, Louisiana |
| KBOO | 90.7 FM | Portland, Oregon |
| KBOQ | 100.9 FM | Lima, Montana |
| KBOS-FM | 94.9 FM | Tulare, California |
| KBOT | 104.1 FM | Pelican Rapids, Minnesota |
| KBOU | 95.9 FM | Tok, Alaska |
| KBOX | 104.1 FM | Lompoc, California |
| KBOY-FM | 95.7 FM | Medford, Oregon |
| KBOZ-FM | 99.9 FM | Bozeman, Montana |
| KBPA | 103.5 FM | Austin, Texas |
| KBPG | 89.5 FM | Montevideo, Minnesota |
| KBPI | 107.9 FM | Fort Collins, Colorado |
| KBPL | 107.9 FM | Pueblo, Colorado |
| KBPN | 88.3 FM | Brainerd, Minnesota |
| KBPR | 90.7 FM | Brainerd, Minnesota |
| KBPU | 88.7 FM | De Queen, Arkansas |
| KBPW | 88.1 FM | Hampton, Arkansas |
| KBPY | 107.7 FM | Hay Springs, Nebraska |
| KBQB | 92.7 FM | Chico, California |
| KBQC | 88.5 FM | Independence, Kansas |
| KBQF | 104.3 FM | McFarland, California |
| KBQI | 107.9 FM | Albuquerque, New Mexico |
| KBQL | 92.7 FM | Las Vegas, New Mexico |
| KBQQ | 103.9 FM | Smiley, Texas |
| KBRA | 95.9 FM | Freer, Texas |
| KBRB-FM | 92.7 FM | Ainsworth, Nebraska |
| KBRG | 100.3 FM | San Jose, California |
| KBRI | 104.1 FM | Clarendon, Arkansas |
| KBRJ | 104.1 FM | Anchorage, Alaska |
| KBRK-FM | 93.7 FM | Brookings, South Dakota |
| KBRQ | 102.5 FM | Hillsboro, Texas |
| KBRS | 106.9 FM | Belle Rose, Louisiana |
| KBRW-FM | 91.9 FM | Barrow, Alaska |
| KBRX-FM | 102.9 FM | O'Neill, Nebraska |
| KBRY | 92.3 FM | Sargent, Nebraska |
| KBRZ-FM | 89.3 FM | Victoria, Texas |
| KBSA | 90.9 FM | El Dorado, Arkansas |
| KBSB | 89.7 FM | Bemidji, Minnesota |
| KBSC | 91.9 | Cambridge, Idaho |
| KBSG | 90.1 FM | Raymond, Washington |
| KBSJ | 91.3 FM | Jackpot, Nevada |
| KBSK | 89.9 FM | McCall, Idaho |
| KBSM | 91.7 FM | McCall, Idaho |
| KBSO | 94.7 FM | Corpus Christi, Texas |
| KBSQ | 90.7 FM | McCall, Idaho |
| KBSS | 91.1 FM | Sun Valley, Idaho |
| KBST-FM | 95.7 FM | Big Spring, Texas |
| KBSU | 90.3 FM | Boise, Idaho |
| KBSW | 91.7 FM | Twin Falls, Idaho |
| KBSX | 91.5 FM | Boise, Idaho |
| KBSY | 88.5 FM | Burley, Idaho |
| KBTA-FM | 99.5 FM | Batesville, Arkansas |
| KBTD | 89.1 FM | Freer, Texas |
| KBTE | 104.9 FM | Tulia, Texas |
| KBTG | 88.3 FM | Buffalo, Wyoming |
| KBTK | 97.1 FM | Kachina Village, Arizona |
| KBTL | 88.1 FM | El Dorado, Kansas |
| KBTN-FM | 99.7 FM | Neosho, Missouri |
| KBTO | 101.9 FM | Bottineau, North Dakota |
| KBTP | 101.1 FM | Mertzon, Texas |
| KBTQ | 96.1 FM | Harlingen, Texas |
| KBTS | 94.3 FM | Big Spring, Texas |
| KBTT | 103.7 FM | Haughton, Louisiana |
| KBTW | 104.5 FM | Lenwood, California |
| KBUA | 94.3 FM | San Fernando, California |
| KBUB | 90.3 FM | Brownwood, Texas |
| KBUC | 102.1 FM | Raymondville, Texas |
| KBUE | 105.5 FM | Long Beach, California |
| KBUG | 100.9 FM | Big Spring, Texas |
| KBUK | 104.9 FM | La Grange, Texas |
| KBUL-FM | 98.1 FM | Carson City, Nevada |
| KBUN-FM | 104.5 FM | Blackduck, Minnesota |
| KBUQ | 91.9 FM | Buckland, Alaska |
| KBUS | 101.9 FM | Paris, Texas |
| KBUT | 90.3 FM | Crested Butte, Colorado |
| KBUW | 90.5 FM | Buffalo, Wyoming |
| KBUX | 96.5 FM | Quartzsite, Arizona |
| KBUZ | 90.3 FM | Topeka, Kansas |
| KBVA | 106.5 FM | Bella Vista, Arkansas |
| KBVB | 95.1 FM | Barnesville, Minnesota |
| KBVC | 104.1 FM | Buena Vista, Colorado |
| KBVD | 88.9 FM | Alturas, California |
| KBVM | 88.3 FM | Portland, Oregon |
| KBVP | 104.3 FM | Olney, Texas |
| KBVR | 88.7 FM | Corvallis, Oregon |
| KBVU-FM | 97.5 FM | Alta, Iowa |
| KBWA | 89.1 FM | Brush, Colorado |
| KBWC | 91.1 FM | Marshall, Texas |
| KBWE | 91.9 FM | Burley, Idaho |
| KBWS-FM | 102.9 FM | Sisseton, South Dakota |
| KBWW | 88.3 FM | Broken Bow, Oklahoma |
| KBXB | 97.9 FM | Sikeston, Missouri |
| KBXE | 90.5 FM | Bagley, Minnesota |
| KBXI | 92.5 FM | Park City, Montana |
| KBXL | 94.1 FM | Caldwell, Idaho |
| KBXR | 102.3 FM | Columbia, Missouri |
| KBXT | 101.9 FM | Wixon Valley, Texas |
| KBXX | 97.9 FM | Houston, Texas |
| KBYA | 89.9 FM | Afton, Wyoming |
| KBYB | 101.7 FM | Hope, Arkansas |
| KBYC | 104.5 FM | Markham, Texas |
| KBYI | 94.3 FM | Rexburg, Idaho |
| KBYN | 95.9 FM | Arnold, California |
| KBYO-FM | 92.7 FM | Farmerville, Louisiana |
| KBYR-FM | 91.5 FM | Rexburg, Idaho |
| KBYS | 88.3 FM | Lake Charles, Louisiana |
| KBYU-FM | 89.1 FM | Provo, Utah |
| KBYZ | 96.5 FM | Bismarck, North Dakota |
| KBZD | 99.7 FM | Amarillo, Texas |
| KBZE | 105.9 FM | Berwick, Louisiana |
| KBZI | 106.1 FM | Mooreland, Oklahoma |
| KBZM | 104.7 FM | Big Sky, Montana |
| KBZN | 97.9 FM | Ogden, Utah |
| KBZQ | 99.5 FM | Lawton, Oklahoma |
| KBZS | 106.3 FM | Wichita Falls, Texas |
| KBZT | 94.9 FM | San Diego, California |
| KBZU | 106.7 FM | Benton, Arkansas |

== KC-- ==
| Callsign | Frequency | City of license |
|---|---|---|
| KCAC | 89.5 FM | Camden, Arkansas |
| KCAD | 99.1 FM | Dickinson, North Dakota |
| KCAF-FM | 92.1 FM | Kenedy, Texas |
| KCAI | 89.3 FM | Linden, California |
| KCAJ-FM | 102.1 FM | Roseau, Minnesota |
| KCAL-FM | 96.7 FM | Redlands, California |
| KCAM-FM | 88.7 FM | Glennallen, Alaska |
| KCAQ | 95.9 FM | Camarillo, California |
| KCAR-FM | 104.3 FM | Baxter Springs, Kansas |
| KCAS | 91.5 FM | McCook, Texas |
| KCAV | 90.3 FM | Marshall, Arkansas |
| KCAW | 104.7 FM | Sitka, Alaska |
| KCAZ | 99.5 FM | Rough Rock, Arizona |
| KCBI-FM | 90.9 FM | Dallas, Texas |
| KCBJ | 90.7 FM | Jamestown, North Dakota |
| KCBK | 91.5 FM | Frederick, Oklahoma |
| KCBN | 102.5 FM | Whitesboro, Texas |
| KCBP | 95.5 FM | Westley, California |
| KCBS-FM | 93.1 FM | Los Angeles |
| KCBW | 104.5 FM | Grandin, Missouri |
| KCBX | 90.1 FM | San Luis Obispo, California |
| KCCD | 90.3 FM | Moorhead, Minnesota |
| KCCK-FM | 88.3 FM | Cedar Rapids, Iowa |
| KCCL | 101.5 FM | Woodland, California |
| KCCM-FM | 91.1 FM | Moorhead, Minnesota |
| KCCN-FM | 100.3 FM | Honolulu, Hawaii |
| KCCR-FM | 104.5 FM | Blunt, South Dakota |
| KCCS | 91.7 FM | Starkville, Colorado |
| KCCU | 89.3 FM | Lawton, Oklahoma |
| KCCV-FM | 92.3 FM | Olathe, Kansas |
| KCCY-FM | 96.9 FM | Pueblo, Colorado |
| KCDA | 103.1 FM | Post Falls, Idaho |
| KCDC | 102.5 FM | Loma, Colorado |
| KCDD | 103.7 FM | Hamlin, Texas |
| KCDQ | 95.3 FM | Douglas, Arizona |
| KCDU | 101.7 FM | Carmel, California |
| KCDV | 100.9 FM | Cordova, Alaska |
| KCDX | 103.1 FM | Florence, Arizona |
| KCDY | 104.1 FM | Carlsbad, New Mexico |
| KCDZ | 107.7 FM | Twentynine Palms, California |
| KCEA | 89.1 FM | Atherton, California |
| KCEC-FM | 104.5 FM | Wellton, Arizona |
| KCED | 91.3 FM | Centralia, Washington |
| KCEF | 93.3 FM | Chefornak, Alaska |
| KCEI | 90.1 FM | Red River, New Mexico |
| KCEL | 96.1 FM | Mojave, California |
| KCEP | 88.1 FM | Las Vegas, Nevada |
| KCEU | 89.7 FM | Price, Utah |
| KCEZ | 102.1 FM | Los Molinos, California |
| KCFA | 106.1 FM | Arnold, California |
| KCFB | 91.5 FM | Saint Cloud, Minnesota |
| KCFD | 88.1 FM | Crawford, Nebraska |
| KCFH | 89.1 FM | Two Harbors, California |
| KCFN | 91.1 FM | Wichita, Kansas |
| KCFP | 91.9 FM | Pueblo, Colorado |
| KCFR-FM | 90.1 FM | Denver, Colorado |
| KCFV | 89.5 FM | Ferguson, Missouri |
| KCFX | 101.1 FM | Harrisonville, Missouri |
| KCFY | 88.1 FM | Yuma, Arizona |
| KCGB-FM | 105.5 FM | Hood River, Oregon |
| KCGC | 94.5 FM | Merino, Colorado |
| KCGK | 104.1 FM | Lutesville, Missouri |
| KCGL | 104.1 FM | Powell, Wyoming |
| KCGM | 95.7 FM | Scobey, Montana |
| KCGN-FM | 101.5 FM | Ortonville, Minnesota |
| KCGQ-FM | 99.3 FM | Gordonville, Missouri |
| KCGR | 90.5 FM | Oran, Missouri |
| KCGS-FM | 88.1 FM | Marshall, Arkansas |
| KCGY | 95.1 FM | Laramie, Wyoming |
| KCHA-FM | 95.9 FM | Charles City, Iowa |
| KCHE-FM | 92.1 FM | Cherokee, Iowa |
| KCHG | 88.9 FM | Cedar City, Utah |
| KCHH | 95.5 FM | Worden, Montana |
| KCHI-FM | 102.5 FM | Chillicothe, Missouri |
| KCHK-FM | 95.5 FM | New Prague, Minnesota |
| KCHO | 91.7 FM | Chico, California |
| KCHQ | 100.1 FM | Soda Springs, Idaho |
| KCHR-FM | 107.3 FM | Cotton Plant, Arkansas |
| KCHT | 99.7 FM | Childress, Texas |
| KCHW | 102.7 FM | Chewelah, Washington |
| KCHX | 106.7 FM | Midland, Texas |
| KCHZ | 95.7 FM | Ottawa, Kansas |
| KCIC | 88.5 FM | Grand Junction, Colorado |
| KCIE | 90.5 FM | Dulce, New Mexico |
| KCIF | 90.3 FM | Hilo, Hawaii |
| KCII-FM | 106.1 FM | Washington, Iowa |
| KCIL | 96.7 FM | Morgan City, Louisiana |
| KCIN | 94.9 FM | Cedar City, Utah |
| KCIR | 90.7 FM | Twin Falls, Idaho |
| KCIV | 99.9 FM | Mount Bullion, California |
| KCIX | 105.9 FM | Garden City, Idaho |
| KCJA | 89.5 FM | Conway, Iowa |
| KCJC | 102.3 FM | Dardanelle, Arkansas |
| KCJH | 89.1 FM | Livingston, California |
| KCJK | 105.1 FM | Garden City, Missouri |
| KCJX | 88.9 FM | Carbondale, Colorado |
| KCJZ | 105.3 FM | Cambria, California |
| KCKB | 104.1 FM | Moran, Texas |
| KCKC | 102.1 FM | Kansas City, Missouri |
| KCKD | 90.7 FM | Garapan, Northern Marianas Islands |
| KCKE | 90.3 FM | Chillicothe, Missouri |
| KCKF | 91.9 FM | Cuba, Missouri |
| KCKH | 95.9 FM | Mansfield, Missouri |
| KCKJ | 89.5 FM | Sarcoxie, Missouri |
| KCKL | 95.9 FM | Malakoff, Texas |
| KCKO | 107.9 FM | Rio Rico, Arizona |
| KCKP | 100.9 FM | Laurie, Missouri |
| KCKR | 91.9 FM | Church Point, Louisiana |
| KCKT | 88.5 FM | Crockett, Texas |
| KCKV | 91.9 FM | Kirksville, Missouri |
| KCKZ | 103.5 FM | Huntsville, Missouri |
| KCLB-FM | 93.7 FM | Coachella, California |
| KCLC | 89.1 FM | St. Charles, Missouri |
| KCLD-FM | 104.7 FM | Saint Cloud, Minnesota |
| KCLH | 94.7 FM | Caledonia, Minnesota |
| KCLI-FM | 99.3 FM | Cordell, Oklahoma |
| KCLK-FM | 94.1 FM | Clarkston, Washington |
| KCLL | 100.1 FM | San Angelo, Texas |
| KCLM | 89.7 FM | Santa Maria, California |
| KCLP | 101.1 FM | Luverne, Minnesota |
| KCLQ | 107.9 FM | Lebanon, Missouri |
| KCLR-FM | 99.3 FM | Boonville, Missouri |
| KCLS | 101.5 FM | Leeds, Utah |
| KCLT | 104.9 FM | West Helena, Arkansas |
| KCLU-FM | 88.3 FM | Thousand Oaks, California |
| KCLV-FM | 99.1 FM | Clovis, New Mexico |
| KCLY | 100.9 FM | Clay Center, Kansas |
| KCLZ | 95.5 FM | Twentynine Palms, California |
| KCMB | 104.7 FM | Baker, Oregon |
| KCMC-FM | 94.3 FM | Viola, Arkansas |
| KCMD | 99.3 FM | Grants Pass, Oregon |
| KCME | 88.7 FM | Manitou Springs, Colorado |
| KCMF | 89.7 FM | Fergus Falls, Minnesota |
| KCMH | 91.5 FM | Mountain Home, Arkansas |
| KCMI | 97.1 FM | Terrytown, Nebraska |
| KCML | 99.9 FM | Saint Joseph, Minnesota |
| KCMM | 99.1 FM | Belgrade, Montana |
| KCMO-FM | 94.9 FM | Shawnee, Kansas/Kansas City, Missouri |
| KCMP | 89.3 FM | Northfield, Minnesota |
| KCMQ | 96.7 FM | Columbia, Missouri |
| KCMR | 97.9 FM | Mason City, Iowa |
| KCMS | 105.3 FM | Edmonds, Washington |
| KCMT | 92.1 FM | Green Valley, Arizona |
| KCMX-FM | 101.9 FM | Ashland, Oregon |
| KCMZ | 105.5 FM | Ozona, Texas |
| KCNA | 102.7 FM | Cave Junction, Oregon |
| KCNB | 94.7 FM | Chadron, Nebraska |
| KCND | 90.5 FM | Bismarck, North Dakota |
| KCNE-FM | 91.9 FM | Chadron, Nebraska |
| KCNL | 105.9 FM | Quartzsite, Arizona |
| KCNN | 97.7 FM | Benson, Arizona |
| KCNO | 94.5 FM | Alturas, California |
| KCNP | 89.5 FM | Ada, Oklahoma |
| KCNQ | 102.5 FM | Kernville, California |
| KCNT | 88.1 FM | Hastings, Nebraska |
| KCNU | 103.9 FM | Silver City, Idaho |
| KCNV | 89.7 FM | Las Vegas, Nevada |
| KCNY | 107.1 FM | Greenbrier, Arkansas |
| KCOB-FM | 95.9 FM | Newton, Iowa |
| KCOL-FM | 92.5 FM | Groves, Texas |
| KCON | 92.7 FM | Vilonia, Arkansas |
| KCOQ | 98.9 FM | Steamboat Springs, Colorado |
| KCOT | 96.3 FM | Cotulla, Texas |
| KCOU | 88.1 FM | Columbia, Missouri |
| KCOZ | 91.7 FM | Point Lookout, Missouri |
| KCPB-FM | 90.9 FM | Warrenton, Oregon |
| KCPC | 88.3 FM | Camino, California |
| KCPI | 94.9 FM | Albert Lea, Minnesota |
| KCPL | 90.5 FM | Astoria, Oregon |
| KCPR | 91.3 FM | San Luis Obispo, California |
| KCQQ | 106.5 FM | Davenport, Iowa |
| KCRB-FM | 88.5 FM | Bemidji, Minnesota |
| KCRE-FM | 94.3 FM | Crescent City, California |
| KCRF-FM | 96.7 FM | Lincoln City, Oregon |
| KCRH | 89.9 FM | Hayward, California |
| KCRI | 89.3 FM | Indio, California |
| KCRK-FM | 92.1 FM | Colville, Washington |
| KCRL | 90.3 FM | Sunrise Beach, Missouri |
| KCRR | 97.7 FM | Grundy Center, Iowa |
| KCRS-FM | 103.3 FM | Midland, Texas |
| KCRT-FM | 92.5 FM | Trinidad, Colorado |
| KCRU | 89.1 FM | Oxnard, California |
| KCRV-FM | 105.1 FM | Caruthersville, Missouri |
| KCRW | 89.9 FM | Santa Monica, California |
| KCRX-FM | 102.3 FM | Seaside, Oregon |
| KCRY | 88.1 FM | Mojave, California |
| KCRZ | 104.9 FM | Tipton, California |
| KCSB-FM | 91.9 FM | Santa Barbara, California |
| KCSC-FM | 95.9 FM | Woodward, Oklahoma |
| KCSD | 90.9 FM | Sioux Falls, South Dakota |
| KCSE | 90.7 FM | Lamar, Colorado |
| KCSH | 88.9 FM | Ellensburg, Washington |
| KCSI | 95.3 FM | Villisca, Iowa |
| KCSM | 91.1 FM | San Mateo, California |
| KCSN | 88.5 FM | Northridge, California |
| KCSP-FM | 90.3 FM | Casper, Wyoming |
| KCSS | 91.9 FM | Turlock, California |
| KCST-FM | 106.9 FM | Florence, Oregon |
| KCSU-FM | 90.5 FM | Fort Collins, Colorado |
| KCSY | 106.3 FM | Twisp, Washington |
| KCTI-FM | 88.1 FM | Gonzales, Texas |
| KCTN | 100.1 FM | Garnavillo, Iowa |
| KCTR | 102.9 FM | Billings, Montana |
| KCTT-FM | 101.7 FM | Yellville, Arkansas |
| KCTX-FM | 96.1 FM | Childress, Texas |
| KCTZ | 90.3 FM | San Lucas, California |
| KCUA | 92.5 FM | Maeser, Utah |
| KCUK | 88.1 FM | Chevak, Alaska |
| KCUR-FM | 89.3 FM | Kansas City, Missouri |
| KCVC | 90.1 FM | Cherry Valley, Arkansas |
| KCVG | 89.9 FM | Hastings, Nebraska |
| KCVI | 101.5 FM | Blackfoot, Idaho |
| KCVJ | 100.3 FM | Osceola, Missouri |
| KCVK | 107.7 FM | Otterville, Missouri |
| KCVM | 93.5 FM | Hudson, Iowa |
| KCVN | 104.5 FM | Cozad, Nebraska |
| KCVO-FM | 91.7 FM | Camdenton, Missouri |
| KCVP | 88.3 FM | Pierre, South Dakota |
| KCVQ | 89.7 FM | Knob Noster, Missouri |
| KCVR-FM | 98.9 FM | Columbia, California |
| KCVS | 91.7 FM | Salina, Kansas |
| KCVT | 92.5 FM | Silver Lake, Kansas |
| KCVW | 94.3 FM | Kingman, Kansas |
| KCVX | 91.7 FM | Salem, Missouri |
| KCVY | 89.9 FM | Cabool, Missouri |
| KCVZ | 92.1 FM | Dixon, Missouri |
| KCWA | 93.9 FM | Loveland, Colorado |
| KCWB | 92.1 FM | Byron, Wyoming |
| KCWC-FM | 88.1 FM | Riverton, Wyoming |
| KCWD | 96.1 FM | Harrison, Arkansas |
| KCWN | 99.9 FM | New Sharon, Iowa |
| KCWR | 107.1 FM | Bakersfield, California |
| KCWU | 88.1 FM | Ellensburg, Washington |
| KCXR | 100.3 FM | Taft, Oklahoma |
| KCXX | 103.9 FM | Comanche, Texas |
| KCXY | 95.3 FM | East Camden, Arkansas |
| KCYA | 97.7 FM | Rolling Hills, Wyoming |
| KCYE | 102.7 FM | Boulder City, Nevada |
| KCYN | 97.1 FM | Moab, Utah |
| KCYS | 96.5 FM | Seaside, Oregon |
| KCYY | 100.3 FM | San Antonio, Texas |
| KCYZ | 105.1 FM | Ames, Iowa |
| KCZE | 95.1 FM | New Hampton, Iowa |
| KCZO | 92.1 FM | Carrizo Springs, Texas |
| KCZQ | 102.3 FM | Cresco, Iowa |
| KCZY | 107.3 FM | Crownpoint, New Mexico |

== See also ==
- North American call sign
