= 91.9 FM =

FM radio frequency

The following radio stations broadcast on FM frequency 91.9 MHz:

== Argentina ==
- Alternativa in Plottier, Neuquén
- Bunker in Santa Clara del Mar, Buenos Aires
- Class in Sáenz Peña, Buenos Aires
- Cristo la Solucion in Alberdi, Buenos Aires
- del Centro in Chivilcoy, Buenos Aires
- Digital in Córdoba
- Directa in Resistencia, Chaco
- El Fortín in San Miguel de Tucumán, Tucumán
- Factory in Reconquista, Santa Fe
- Fantástico in Buenos Aires
- Fuego in Remedios de Escalada, Buenos Aires
- Impacto in Colón, Entre Ríos
- La Torre in Buenos Aires
- Mantra in Buenos Aires
- Metro Rosario in Rosario, Santa Fe
- Milenium in Villa Constitución, Santa Fe
- Oasis in Salliquelo, Buenos Aires
- Play24 in Río Grande, Tierra del Fuego
- Radio de noticias in Santa Fe de la Vera Cruz, Santa Fe
- Radio María in La Quiaca, Jujuy
- Radio María in Puerto Deseado, Santa Cruz
- Radio María in Jáchal, San Juan
- ROTECO in General Rodríguez, Buenos Aires
- Sarmiento in Bowen, Mendoza
- Viva in Comodoro Rivadavia, Chubut

== Australia ==
- 4SEE in Sunshine Coast, Queensland
- 91.9 Fresh FM in Gladstone, Queensland
- 5ADL in Adelaide, South Australia
- 3BDG in Bendigo, Victoria
- MTM FM in Coonamble, NSW

== Canada (Channel 220) ==
- CBCC-FM in Hearst, Ontario
- CBEW-FM-1 in Leamington, Ontario
- CBF-FM-9 in Mont-Laurier, Quebec
- CBJ-FM-1 in Chibougamau, Quebec
- CBKF-FM-4 in Bellegarde, Saskatchewan
- CBNE-FM in Port aux Basques, Newfoundland and Labrador
- CBOB-FM in Brockville, Ontario
- CBON-FM-28 in Chapleau, Ontario
- CBUV-FM in Fort St. James, British Columbia
- CBYZ-FM in Vavenby, British Columbia
- CHIN-1-FM in Toronto, Ontario
- CHNV-FM-1 in Crawford Bay, British Columbia
- CIDE-FM in Sioux Lookout, Ontario
- CIDE-FM-1 in Bearskin Lake, Ontario
- CIDE-FM-2 in Big Trout Lake, Ontario
- CIDE-FM-3 in Cat Lake, Ontario
- CIDE-FM-4 in Deer Lake, Ontario
- CIDE-FM-5 in Fort Severn, Ontario
- CIDE-FM-6 in Kasabonika, Ontario
- CIDE-FM-7 in Kingfisher Lake, Ontario
- CIDE-FM-8 in Lac Seul/Kejick Bay, Ontario
- CIDE-FM-9 in Muskrat Dam, Ontario
- CIDE-FM-10 in North Spirit Lake, Ontario
- CIDE-FM-11 in Osnaburgh, Ontario
- CIDE-FM-12 in Pikangikum, Ontario
- CIDE-FM-13 in Poplar Hill, Ontario
- CIDE-FM-14 in Sachigo Lake, Ontario
- CIDE-FM-15 in Sandy Lake, Ontario
- CIDE-FM-16 in Slate Falls, Ontario
- CIDE-FM-17 in Wapekeka, Ontario
- CIDE-FM-18 in Weagamow Lake, Ontario
- CIDE-FM-19 in Wunnummin Lake, Ontario
- CIDE-FM-20 in Webequie First Nation, Ontario
- CIDE-FM-21 in Keewaywin First Nation, Ontario
- CJEC-FM in Quebec City, Quebec
- CJLR-FM-2 in Denare Beach/Creighton, Saskatchewan
- CKLX-FM in Montreal, Quebec
- CKLY-FM in Lindsay, Ontario
- CKNI-FM in Moncton, New Brunswick
- CKVI-FM in Kingston, Ontario
- VF2040 in Wollaston Lake, Saskatchewan
- VF2200 in Winfield, British Columbia
- VF2588 in Swift Current, Saskatchewan

== China ==
- Beijing Public Service Radio in Beijing

== India ==
- 91.9 Sarthak FM in Bhubaneswar & Rourkela, Odisha, India
- 91.9 Radio Mango in Cochin, India.
- Indigo 91.9 FM in Bangalore (Karnataka) and Goa, India
- Radio City (alternative frequency) in Agra (UP), Bareilly (UP), Varanasi (UP), Gorakhpur (UP), Hisar (HR), Karnal (HR), Madurai (TN), Ranchi (JH), Udaipur (RJ) and Jalandhar (PB)
- 91.9 Friends FM

== Japan ==
- JOUF in Osaka

== Korea, Republic of ==
- HLKV-FM in Seoul

== Malaysia ==
- Ai FM in Kota Kinabalu, Sabah
- Red FM in Kuching, Sarawak

== Mexico ==
- XHBL-FM in Culiacán, Sinaloa
- XHEC-FM in Sabinas, Coahuila
- XHESP-FM in Guadalajara, Jalisco
- XHHPL-FM in Huajuapan de León, Oaxaca
- XHJJM-FM in Jojutla, Morelos
- XHMET-FM in Temozon, Yucatán
- XHPHOP-FM in Hopelchén, Campeche
- XHRLM-FM in Ciudad Mante, Tamulipas
- XHSCBP-FM in Ciudad Altamirano, Guerrero
- XHSCBY-FM in Jacala de Ledezma, Hidalgo
- XHSCEF-FM in Santa Clara del Cobre, Salvador Escalante, Michoacán
- XHSS-FM in San Luis Potosí, San Luis Potosí
- XHUASM-FM in Matehuala, San Luis Potosí
- XHVJL-FM in Puerto Vallarta, Jalisco
- XHYA-FM in Irapuato, Guanajuato

== Philippines ==
- 91.9 The Bomb FM in Cavite City, Cavite
- DWBL-FM in San Fernando, Pampanga
- DWCH in Batangas City
- DWZO in Olongapo City
- DYKS-FM in Bacolod City
- DXEC (now DXFO) in Cagayan De Oro City
- DZYS in Baguio City
- DWLV-FM in Naga City
- DXCK in General Santos City
- DXMD in Pagadian City
- DWSG in Sorsogon City
- DXNM in Tagum City
- DXPM in Digos City
- DXWM in Mati City, Davao Oriental
- DXPE in Kidapawan City

== United States (Channel 220) ==
- KAEB in Sand Point, Alaska
- KALD in Caldwell, Texas
- KANR in Santa Rosa, New Mexico
- KAQA in Kilauea, Hawaii
- KASU in Jonesboro, Arkansas
- KAVX in Lufkin, Texas
- KAXV in Bastrop, Louisiana
- KBDD in Winfield, Kansas
- KBHZ in Willmar, Minnesota
- KBRW in Barrow, Alaska
- KBSC in Cambridge, Idaho
- KBUQ in Buckland, Alaska
- KBWE in Burley, Idaho
- KCFP in Pueblo, Colorado
- KCKF in Cuba, Missouri
- KCKR in Church Point, Louisiana
- KCKV in Kirksville, Missouri
- KCNE in Chadron, Nebraska
- KCSB in Santa Barbara, California
- KCSS (FM) in Turlock, California
- KDLL in Kenai, Alaska
- KDNA in Yakima, Washington
- KDNE in Crete, Nebraska
- KDPO in Port Orford, Oregon
- KDRG in Deering, Alaska
- KDSU in Fargo, North Dakota
- KDUR in Durango, Colorado
- KELC in Hawthorne, Nevada
- KESY (FM) in Baker City, Oregon
- KEYP in Price, Utah
- KGLT in Bozeman, Montana
- KGNR in John Day, Oregon
- KHCJ in Jefferson, Texas
- KHKL in Laytonville, California
- KHLR in Harrison, Arkansas
- KHPO in Port o'Connor, Texas
- KHSR in Crescent City, California
- KIAM in North Nenana, Alaska
- KIAN in Kiana, Alaska
- KIEA in Selawik, Alaska
- KJAL in McAlester, Oklahoma
- KJGS in Aurora, Nebraska
- KJLG in Emporia, Kansas
- KJNR in Bethel, Alaska
- KJOL-FM in Montrose, Colorado
- KLDD in McCloud, California
- KLLR in Dripping Springs, Texas
- KLVR in Middletown, California
- KLWD in Gillette, Wyoming
- KLXV in Glenwood Springs, Colorado
- KMEO in Mertzon, Texas
- KMRL in Buras, Louisiana
- KMUN in Astoria, Oregon
- KNUN in Toksook Bay, Alaska
- KOFW in Deltana, Alaska
- KOHN in Sells, Arizona
- KOLD-FM in Cold Bay, Alaska
- KONQ in Dodge City, Kansas
- KORI in Noorvik, Alaska
- KOUA in Ada, Oklahoma
- KPBW in Brewster, Washington
- KPFC in Callisburg, Texas
- KPGA (FM) in Morton, Texas
- KPMA-FM in Archer City, Texas
- KPMD in Evanston, Wyoming
- KPSV-FM in Tulare, California
- KPTZ in Port Townsend, Washington
- KPUW in Alpine, Wyoming
- KQNY in Quincy, California
- KQOH in Marshfield, Missouri
- KQPA-FM in Paris, Texas
- KQSD in Lowry, South Dakota
- KQVK in Kivalina, Alaska
- KRAR in Espanola, New Mexico
- KRRE in Las Vegas, New Mexico
- KRTY in Great Bend, Kansas
- KRVM in Eugene, Oregon
- KSDA in Agat, Guam
- KSDB in Manhattan, Kansas
- KSFC in Spokane, Washington
- KSOI in Murray, Iowa
- KSPB in Pebble Beach, California
- KSRD in Saint Joseph, Missouri
- KSSU in Durant, Oklahoma
- KTCC in Colby, Kansas
- KTDV in State Center, Iowa
- KTML in South Fork, Colorado
- KTMV in Mountain Village, Alaska
- KTOG in Togiak, Alaska
- KTRU in La Harpe, Kansas
- KUDU in Tok, Alaska
- KUFN in Hamilton, Montana
- KUHB in Saint Paul, Alaska
- KUUK in Noatak, Alaska
- KUWR in Laramie, Wyoming
- KVCR (FM) in San Bernardino, California
- KVIR in Dolan Springs, Arizona
- KVJC in Globe, Arizona
- KWJC in Liberty, Missouri
- KWQX in Perryville, Arkansas
- KWRV in Sun Valley, Idaho
- KWSC in Wayne, Nebraska
- KWSO in Warm Springs, Oregon
- KWTD in Ridgecrest, California
- KXBR in International Falls, Minnesota
- KXFR in Socorro, New Mexico
- KXRI in Amarillo, Texas
- KXRJ in Russellville, Arkansas
- KYKT in Yakutat, Alaska
- KYRM in Yuma, Arizona
- KYUP in Scammon Bay, Alaska
- KZGC-FM in Garden City, Kansas
- KZNC in Red Dog Mine Port, Alaska
- KZOW in Forest City, Iowa
- KZRF-FM in Sulphur Springs, Texas
- WAAE in New Bern, North Carolina
- WAIC in Springfield, Massachusetts
- WAPX in Clarksville, Tennessee
- WARD in New Paris, Ohio
- WASW in Waycross, Georgia
- WAUM in Duck Hill, Mississippi
- WAYL in Saint Augustine, Florida
- WBHZ in Elkins, West Virginia
- WBPR in Worcester, Massachusetts
- WCAL in California, Pennsylvania
- WCEL in Plattsburgh, New York
- WCFM in Williamstown, Massachusetts
- WCLK in Atlanta, Georgia
- WCMK in Putney, Vermont
- WDPW in Greenville, Michigan
- WDRT in Viroqua, Wisconsin
- WDSV in Greenville, Mississippi
- WEMI in Appleton, Wisconsin
- WEVQ in Littleton, New Hampshire
- WFPB in Falmouth, Massachusetts
- WFPK in Louisville, Kentucky
- WFSS in Fayetteville, North Carolina
- WFWM in Frostburg, Maryland
- WGBQ in Lynchburg, Tennessee
- WGCP in Cadillac, Michigan
- WGDE in Defiance, Ohio
- WGIB in Birmingham, Alabama
- WGRN-LP in Columbus, Ohio
- WGTS in Takoma Park, Maryland
- WHDD-FM in Sharon, Connecticut
- WHDI in Sister Bay, Wisconsin
- WHGN in Crystal River, Florida
- WHKU in Proctorville, Ohio
- WHOJ in Terre Haute, Indiana
- WHRE in Eastville, Virginia
- WHRT-FM in Cokesbury, South Carolina
- WHVM in Owego, New York
- WINH in Hinckley, Minnesota
- WINO in Watkins Glen, New York
- WITT (FM) in Zionsville, Indiana
- WJCH in Joliet, Illinois
- WJEF in Lafayette, Indiana
- WJIF in Opp, Alabama
- WKCO in Gambier, Ohio
- WKJA in Brunswick, Ohio
- WKVH in Monticello, Florida
- WKWJ in Key West, Florida
- WLBL in Wausau, Wisconsin
- WLFS in Port Wentworth, Georgia
- WLJS in Jacksonville, Alabama
- WLKP in Belpre, Ohio
- WMBV in Dixons Mills, Alabama
- WMEB in Orono, Maine
- WMJC in Richland, Michigan
- WMKL in Hammocks, Florida
- WMMH in Houtzdale, Pennsylvania
- WMTU in Houghton, Michigan
- WMYE in Fort Myers, Florida
- WNGN (FM) in Argyle, New York
- WNRN-FM in Charlottesville, Virginia
- WORW in Port Huron, Michigan
- WOUH in Chillicothe, Ohio
- WOWL in Burnsville, Mississippi
- WOZQ in Northampton, Massachusetts
- WPHP in Wheeling, West Virginia
- WQKO in Howe, Indiana
- WRCM in Wingate, North Carolina
- WRVN in Utica, New York
- WSCF-FM in Vero Beach, Florida
- WSHR in Lake Ronkonkoma, New York
- WSIU (FM) in Carbondale, Illinois
- WSLX in New Canaan, Connecticut
- WSMJ in North Wildwood, New Jersey
- WSMO in Mount Forest, Michigan
- WTCS-LP in Chattanooga, Tennessee
- WTIR in Brighton Reservation, Florida
- WUIS in Springfield, Illinois
- WUMB in Boston, Massachusetts
- WUOT in Knoxville, Tennessee
- WVGS in Statesboro, Georgia
- WVME in Meadville, Pennsylvania
- WVSE in Christiansted, U.S. Virgin Islands
- WVSH in Huntington, Indiana
- WVTR in Marion, Virginia
- WWOS-FM in St. George, South Carolina
- WWRA in Clinton, Louisiana
- WXHM in Middletown, Delaware
- WXMF in Marion, Ohio
- WXPJ in Hackettstown, New Jersey
- WXPW in Wausau, Wisconsin
- WYFO in Lakeland, Florida
- WYFP in Harpswell, Maine
- WYTL in Wyomissing, Pennsylvania
- WZRG in Kulpmont, Pennsylvania
