= KBRW =

KBRW may refer to:

- KBRW (AM), a radio station (680 AM) licensed to Barrow, Alaska, United States
- KBRW-FM, a radio station (91.9 FM) licensed to Barrow, Alaska, United States
