= KCRT =

KCRT may refer to:

- KCRT (AM), a radio station (1240 AM) licensed to Trinidad, Colorado, United States
- KCRT-FM, a radio station (92.5 FM) licensed to Trinidad, Colorado, United States
- Z.M. Jack Stell Field (ICAO code KCRT) in Crossett, Arkansas, United States
