= KBCR =

KBCR may refer to:

- KBCR-FM, a radio station (96.9 FM) licensed to Steamboat Springs, Colorado, United States
- KKSB, a radio station (1230 AM) licensed to Steamboat Springs, Colorado, which held the call sign KBCR until 1995 and from 1996 to 2015
- KBCR, the Kolkata Metro station code for Behala Chowrasta metro station, West Bengal, India
