= KCSS =

KCSS may refer to:

- KCSS (FM), a radio station (91.9 FM) licensed to Turlock, California, United States
- King City Secondary School, a high school in King City, Ontario, Canada
- Knight Commander or Knight Commander with Star of the Order of St. Sylvester
