= KCXX =

KCXX may refer to:

- KCXX (FM), a radio station (103.9 FM) licensed to serve Comanche, Texas, United States
- KHTI, a radio station (103.9 FM) licensed to serve Lake Arrowhead, California, United States, which held the call sign KCXX from 1995 to 2015
