= WMEB =

WMEB may refer to:

- WMEB-FM, a radio station (91.9 FM) licensed to serve Orono, Maine, United States
- WMEB-TV, a television station (channel 22, virtual 12) licensed to serve Orono
