= KBTP =

KBTP may refer to:

- Pittsburgh-Butler Regional Airport (ICAO code KBTP)
- KBTP (FM), a radio station (101.1 FM) licensed to serve Mertzon, Texas, United States
