= KBJX =

KBJX may refer to:

- KBJX (FM), a radio station (103.5 FM) licensed to serve Mertzon, Texas, United States
- KGTM, a radio station (98.1 FM) licensed to serve Shelley, Idaho, United States, which held the call sign KBJX from 1998 to 2012
