= KCKB =

KCKB may refer to:

- North Central West Virginia Airport (ICAO code KCKB)
- KCKB (FM), a radio station (104.1 FM) licensed to serve Moran, Texas, United States
