= KBGE =

KBGE may refer to:

- KBGE (FM), a radio station (94.9 FM) licensed to serve Cannon Beach, Oregon, United States
- KDOK, a radio station (1240 AM) licensed to serve Kilgore, Texas, United States, which held the call sign KBGE from 1999 to 2009
- KWPX-TV, a television station (channel 33) licensed to serve Bellevue, Washington, United States, which held the call sign from 1987 to 1998
- Decatur County Industrial Air Park (ICAO code KBGE)
