= KBCW =

KBCW may refer to:

- KJAL, a radio station (91.9 FM) licensed to serve McAlester, Oklahoma, United States, which held the call sign KBCW-FM from 2006 to 2023
- KPYX, a television station (channel 28, virtual 44) licensed to serve San Francisco, California, United States, which held the call sign KBCW from 2006 to 2023
