= KWBY =

KWBY may refer to:

- KWBY (AM), a radio station (940 AM) licensed to serve Woodburn, Oregon, United States
- KWBY-FM, a radio station (98.5 FM) licensed to serve Ranger, Texas, United States
