= KCNN =

KCNN may refer to:

- KCNN (FM), a radio station (97.7 FM) licensed to serve Benson, Arizona, United States
- KGFK (AM), a radio station (1590 AM) licensed to serve Grand Forks, North Dakota, United States, which held the call sign KCNN from 1986 to 2011
- KLSD, a radio station (1360 AM) licensed to serve San Diego, California, United States, which held call sign KCNN from 1982 to 1983
