= KCGC =

KCGC may refer to:

- KCGC (FM), a radio station (94.5 FM) licensed to serve Merino, Colorado, United States
- KRFD (FM), a radio station (100.1 FM) licensed to serve Fleming, Colorado, which held the call sign KCGC from 2014 to 2015
- KAWJ, a radio station (94.5 FM) licensed to serve Coarsegold, California, United States, which held the call sign KCGC from 2007 to 2011
- Crystal River Airport (ICAO code KCGC)
