= KCUB =

KCUB may refer to:

- KCUB (AM), a radio station (1290 AM) licensed to Tucson, Arizona, United States
- KWBY-FM, a radio station (98.5 FM) licensed to Ranger, Texas, United States, which held the call signs KCUB or KCUB-FM from 1990 to 2011
- Jim Hamilton – L.B. Owens Airport (ICAO code KCUB)
