= KCBZ =

KCBZ may refer to:

- KCBZ-LD, a low-power television station (channel 36, virtual 41) licensed to serve Casper, Wyoming, United States
- KBGE (FM), a radio station (94.9 FM) licensed to serve Cannon Beach, Oregon, United States, which held the call sign KCBZ from 1995 to 2010
