= XHVJL-FM =

Radio station in Puerto Vallarta, Jalisco, Mexico

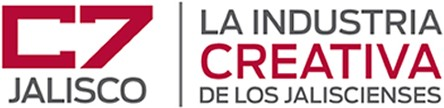
- Puerto Vallarta, Jalisco; Mexico
- Frequency: 91.9 FM
- Branding: C7 Jalisco

Programming
- Format: Public radio

Ownership
- Owner: Government of the State of Jalisco

History
- First air date: 1994
- Call sign meaning: Vallarta JaLisco

Technical information
- Licensing authority: CRT
- Class: B
- ERP: 50 kW
- HAAT: −212.73 m (−697.9 ft)
- Transmitter coordinates: 20°39′09″N 105°14′08″W

Links
- Website: c7jalisco.com

XHVJL-FM is a radio station on 91.9 FM in Puerto Vallarta, Jalisco, Mexico. It is part of the C7 state network of Jalisco with its own local programming.

== History ==
XHVJL was most recently permitted in 1999, but it was put on air in 1994.

It is the sister to XEJLV-AM 1080, which was put on the air at the same time but no longer appears in IFT tables.
