= KYRM =

Spanish-language religious radio station in Yuma, Arizona

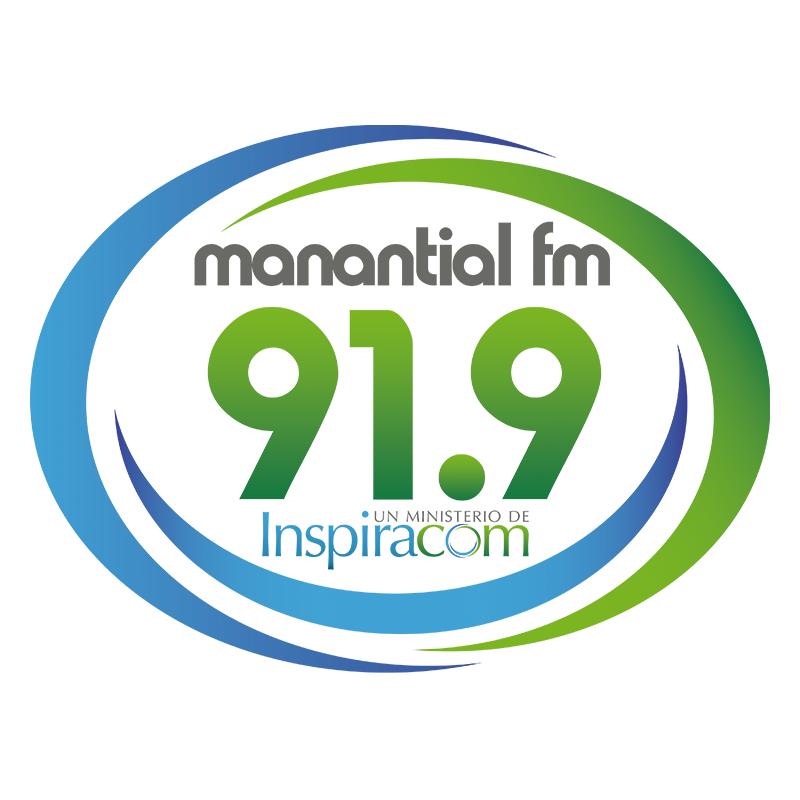
- Yuma, Arizona; United States
- Broadcast area: Yuma, Arizona
- Frequency: 91.9 MHz

Programming
- Format: Spanish Religious

Ownership
- Owner: World Radio Network, Inc.

Technical information
- Licensing authority: FCC
- Facility ID: 73760
- Class: B
- ERP: 6,300 watts
- HAAT: 407 meters (1,335 ft)
- Transmitter coordinates: 33°3′18″N 114°49′37″W

Links
- Public license information: Public file; LMS
- Website: www.manantialyuma.org

KYRM (91.9 FM) is a radio station broadcasting a Spanish Religious format. Licensed to Yuma, Arizona, United States, it serves the Yuma area. The station is owned by World Radio Network, Inc..
