= XHSCBP-FM =

Community radio station in Ciudad Altamirano, Guerrero, Mexico

Ciudad Altamirano, Guerrero; Mexico
- Frequency: 91.9 FM
- Branding: Altamix

Programming
- Format: Community radio

Ownership
- Owner: Altamiradio Comunicaciones, A.C.

History
- First air date: October 2018
- Call sign meaning: (templated callsign)

Technical information
- Class: A
- ERP: 2.87 kW
- HAAT: -67.2 m
- Transmitter coordinates: 18°20′48.56″N 100°39′27.86″W

Links
- Webcast: Listen live
- Website: altamix919fm.com

XHSCBP-FM is a community radio station on 91.9 FM in Ciudad Altamirano, Guerrero. The station is owned by the civil association Altamiradio Comunicaciones, A.C.

== History ==
Altamiradio Comunicaciones filed for a community station on May 13, 2016. The station was awarded on April 11, 2018.
