= XHEC-FM =

Radio station in Sabinas, Coahuila

- Sabinas, Coahuila; Mexico
- Frequency: 91.9 MHz
- Branding: La Más Buena

Programming
- Format: Regional Mexican

Ownership
- Owner: Grupo M; (Organización Radiofónica del Norte, S.A. de C.V.)

History
- First air date: October 14, 1970 (concession)
- Call sign meaning: Jesús Fernando Elizondo Cedillo (original concessionaire)

Technical information
- Licensing authority: CRT
- Class: C1
- ERP: 50 kW
- HAAT: 34.7 m (114 ft)

Links
- Website: www.lamasbuenanotivision.com.mx

XHEC-FM is a radio station in Sabinas, Coahuila. Broadcasting on 91.9 FM, XHEC is owned by Grupo M and carries a Regional Mexican format known as La Más Buena.

== History ==
The station's concession was awarded in 1970 to Jesús Fernando Elizondo Cedillo. The concession was sold to Organización Radiofónica del Norte, S.A. de C.V. in 1996.
