= KBLY =

Christian radio station in Texas

- Newcastle, Texas; United States
- Frequency: 100.5 MHz
- Branding: Y100.5FM

Programming
- Format: Christian

Ownership
- Owner: Positive Radio Network, LLC

History
- First air date: December 11, 2016

Technical information
- Licensing authority: FCC
- Facility ID: 198777
- Class: A
- ERP: 4,500 watts
- HAAT: 115 meters (377 ft)
- Transmitter coordinates: 33°6′1.42″N 98°38′46.22″W

Links
- Public license information: Public file; LMS
- Webcast: Listen live
- Website: https://www.positiveradio.net/

KBLY (100.5 FM) is a radio station licensed to Newcastle, Texas broadcasting a new Christian radio format containing both Contemporary Christian Praise and Country Gospel music. The station is owned by Positive Radio Network, LLC and has offices and a studio in Graham, Texas.

== History ==
KBLY came on the air early in December 2016 playing ad-free Christmas music. On December 26, 2016 KBLY flipped to its full-time format of Contemporary Christian Praise and Country Gospel. In 2018, the station was sold to Positive Radio Network, LLC, along with the permit for KCKB, for $87,000. The sale price represented forgiveness of an outstanding debt owed to Positive Radio Network by previous owners Two Way Communications, LLC; the sale was consummated on January 3, 2019.

== Programming ==
KBLY plays a mix of music, long-form talk, and public service programs.

=== Music ===
The music format, a mix of Contemporary Christian Praise and Country Gospel, is new to the Christian Radio industry and could be likened to a secular Bob or Jack FM format popular in larger Media market.

=== Long-form talk and public service programs ===
KBLY provides air-time to several churches within its listening area, as well as rebroadcasting the radio show Pathway to Victory with Robert Jefress.

=== Sports ===
KBLY also provides seasonal sports to its listening area; including the Texas Rangers and Dallas Cowboys.
