= KQNY =

- Quincy, California; United States
- Frequency: 91.9 MHz
- Branding: KQNY 91.9 FM

Programming
- Format: Variety
- Affiliations: National Federation of Community Broadcasters

Ownership
- Owner: Plumas Community Radio

History
- First air date: 2010

Technical information
- Licensing authority: FCC
- Facility ID: 172610
- Class: A
- ERP: 2,700 watts
- HAAT: −342 metres (−1,122 ft)
- Transmitter coordinates: 39°56′15″N 120°56′49″W

Links
- Public license information: Public file; LMS
- Webcast: Listen Live
- Website: Official Website

KQNY (91.9 FM) is a community radio licensed to serve Quincy, California. The station is owned by Plumas Community Radio and airs a variety format.

The station was assigned the KQNY call letters by the Federal Communications Commission on October 17, 2008.
