= WOZQ =

- Northampton, Massachusetts; United States
- Broadcast area: Pioneer Valley
- Frequency: 91.9 MHz

Programming
- Format: College

Ownership
- Owner: Smith College; (Trustees of the Smith College)

History
- First air date: 1982

Technical information
- Licensing authority: FCC
- Facility ID: 68226
- Class: A
- ERP: 200 watts (horiz.); 175 watts (vert.)
- HAAT: −35 meters (−115 ft)
- Transmitter coordinates: 42°19′13″N 72°38′14″W

Links
- Public license information: Public file; LMS
- Webcast: Listen Live
- Website: WOZQ Online

WOZQ (91.9 FM) is a radio station licensed to serve Northampton, Massachusetts. The station is owned by Smith College and licensed to the Trustees of the Smith College. It airs a college radio format.

The station was assigned the WOZQ call letters by the Federal Communications Commission on November 9, 1981. The station also streams their broadcasts online and publishes archived shows.
