= DWSG =

Radyo Natin Sorsogon (DWSG)
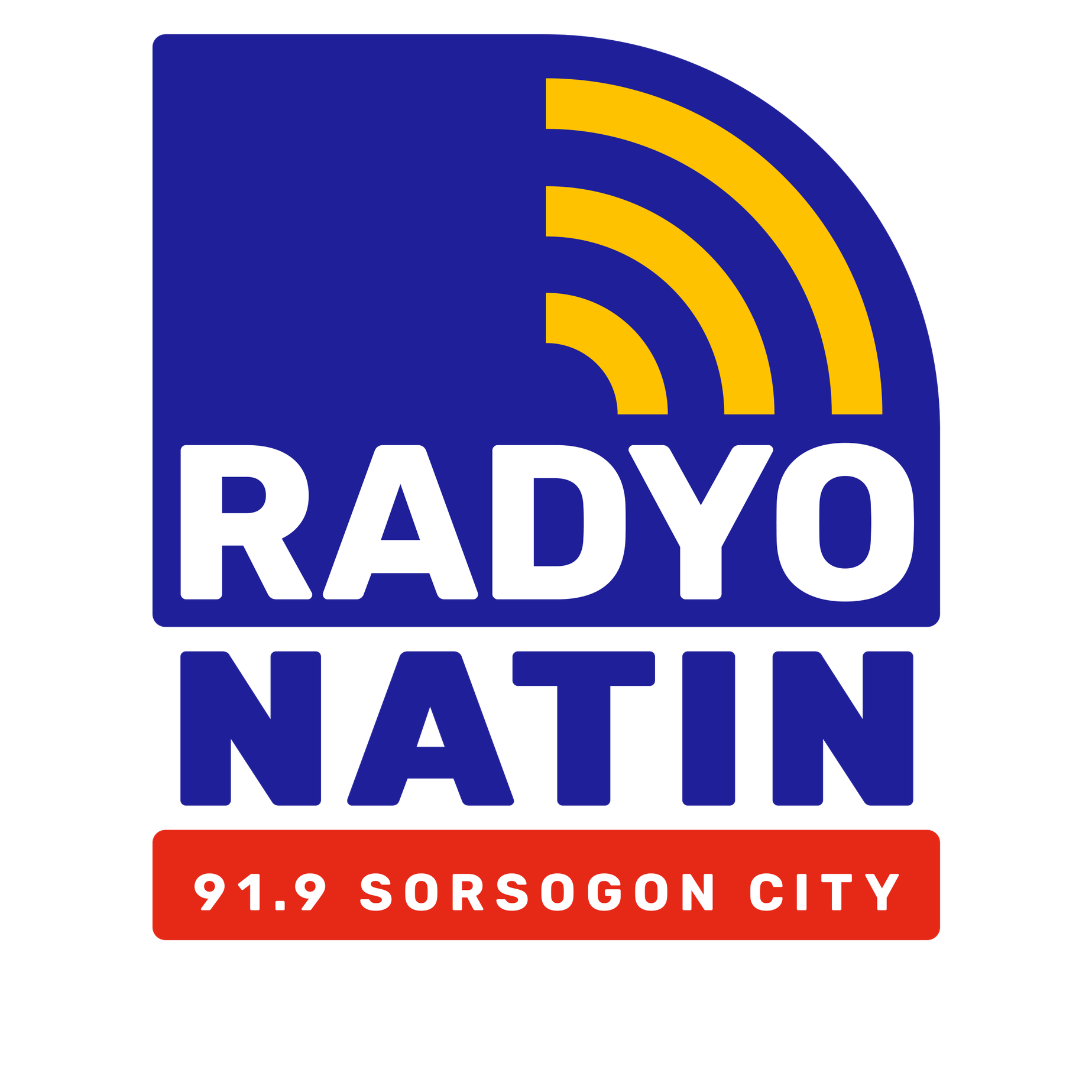
- Sorsogon City; Philippines
- Broadcast area: Sorsogon and surrounding areas
- Frequency: 91.9 MHz
- Branding: 91.9 Radyo Natin

Programming
- Languages: Bicolano, Filipino
- Format: Community radio
- Network: Radyo Natin Network

Ownership
- Owner: MBC Media Group

History
- Call sign meaning: Sorsogon

Technical information
- Licensing authority: NTC
- Class: C, D, E
- Power: 5,000 watts

Links
- Webcast: Listen Live

DWSG (91.9 FM), broadcasting as 91.9 Radyo Natin, is a radio station owned and operated by MBC Media Group. Its studios and transmitter are located on the 2nd Floor of the Roda Building, Maharlika Highway, Brgy. Pangpang, Sorsogon City.
