= KAJX =

Radio station in Aspen, Colorado

Coordinates: 39.197°N 106.804°W

Aspen Public Radio (KAJX)
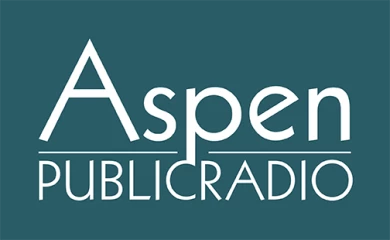
- Aspen, Colorado; United States
- Frequency: 91.5 MHz

Programming
- Format: News/Talk
- Affiliations: NPR

Ownership
- Owner: Aspen Public Radio; (Roaring Fork Public Radio Inc.)

History
- Founded: 1981
- First air date: July 7, 1987

Technical information
- Licensing authority: FCC
- Facility ID: 3009
- Class: A
- ERP: 380 watts
- HAAT: -301 meters
- Translators: K216BF 91.1 Aspen; K207DT 89.3 Basalt; K215AC 90.9 Snowmass Village

Links
- Public license information: Public file; LMS
- Webcast: Listen live; MP3 (Mono); AAC (Stereo)
- Website: aspenpublicradio.org

KCJX
- KCJX
- Carbondale, Colorado; United States
- Frequency: 88.9 MHz

Technical information
- Facility ID: 85785
- Class: C1
- ERP: 4,000 watts
- HAAT: 775 meters (2,543 ft)

Links
- Public license information: Public file; LMS

KAJX (91.5 FM) and KCJX (88.9 FM) are radio stations simulcasting a majority NPR news format with an afternoon Classical Music block during the summer months. The stations are licensed to Roaring Fork Public Radio, Inc. (DBA as Aspen Public Radio) in Aspen, Colorado (KAJX) and Carbondale, Colorado (KCJX). Headquartered inside Suite 134 of the Red Brick Center for the Arts on East Hallam Street in downtown Aspen, the non-commercial station is governed by a board of directors. It serves Roaring Fork, Crystal, Fryingpan, and Eagle River valleys in the state of Colorado.

The station is overseen by Roaring Fork Public Radio, Inc., a 501(c)(3) corporation. The station was founded as Roaring Fork Public Radio Translator, Inc., in 1981 by Isaiah (Sy) Coleman. From 1981 to 1987, the station served as a repeater station for Wyoming Public Radio. After being granted a full-service construction permit in 1985, KAJX became its own station on July 7, 1987; the first local program was founder Coleman ordering a pizza. In 2002 the FCC granted Roaring Fork Public Radio (Aspen Public Radio) its second license, KCJX, Carbondale. KAJX, Aspen, and KCJX, Carbondale, broadcast the same stream.

Aspen Public Radio provides local news broadcasts and reporting each weekday as well as national news and cultural affairs programming from National Public Radio, Public Radio International, American Public Media, PRX, and the BBC.
