= WWRA =

- Clinton, Louisiana; United States
- Broadcast area: Baton Rouge, Louisiana
- Frequency: 91.9 (MHz)
- Branding: "Radio Amor"

Programming
- Format: Spanish language Christian

Ownership
- Owner: Victory Harvest Church

History
- First air date: 2008

Technical information
- Licensing authority: FCC
- Facility ID: 170022
- Class: C3
- ERP: 25,000 watts
- HAAT: 81 meters
- Transmitter coordinates: 30.81686°N 90.81178°W

Links
- Public license information: Public file; LMS
- Webcast: https://ss.redradios.net:8021/stream
- Website: https://www.radioamor919fm.org

WWRA, a.k.a. Radio Amor, is a Spanish language Christian music station aimed at the growing Spanish speaking community around Baton Rouge, Louisiana. The station's initial broadcast license was filed on October 15, 2007, and was granted a Construction permit on December 20, 2007. The station was granted a full non-commercial license on December 11, 2008.
