= WVSE =

- Christiansted, U.S. Virgin Islands; United States
- Broadcast area: US Virgin Islands
- Frequency: 91.9 MHz
- Branding: Latino 91.9

Programming
- Format: Spanish variety format

Ownership
- Owner: Jose J. Martinez Velilla; (Crucian Educational Non-Profit Group)

History
- First air date: January 4, 2011
- Former call signs: WPPD (2011-2012)

Technical information
- Licensing authority: FCC
- Facility ID: 176578
- Class: B
- ERP: 10,000 watts
- HAAT: 238 meters
- Transmitter coordinates: 17°44′51″N 64°50′11″W

Links
- Public license information: Public file; LMS
- Website: Papilove Radio

WVSE (91.9 FM) is a radio station broadcasting a Spanish variety format. Licensed to Christiansted, U.S. Virgin Islands, the station is currently owned by Jose J. Martinez Velilla, under licensee Crucian Educational Non-Profit Group.
