= KBRW (AM) =

Coordinates: 71°15′22.5″N 156°31′44.5″W

- Utqiaġvik, Alaska; United States
- Broadcast area: Alaska Bush
- Frequency: 680 kHz
- Branding: KBRW-AM

Programming
- Format: Public radio Public Affairs; Popular music Religious

Ownership
- Owner: Silakkuagvik Communications, Inc.
- Sister stations: KBRW-FM

History
- First air date: December 22, 1975
- Call sign meaning: BaRroW (city's former name)

Technical information
- Licensing authority: FCC
- Facility ID: 60375
- Class: A (Clear channel)
- Power: 10,000 watts

Links
- Public license information: Public file; LMS
- Webcast: Listen Live
- Website: www.kbrw.org

KBRW (680 AM) is a non-commercial radio station in Utqiaġvik, Alaska, broadcasting with 10,000 watts of power from a non-directional antenna. KBRW is a Class A station broadcasting on the clear-channel frequency of 680 AM. The station airs public radio programming from the National Public Radio and Native Voice One networks. KBRW also airs some locally originated programming, as well as native affairs, popular music and religious programs. KBRW is a pretty common AM station among Finnish and other Nordic DX listeners during winter time as the station is located by the Arctic Ocean and is relatively close to Nordic countries.

Licensee Silakkuagvik Communications, Inc. also operates KBRW-FM at 91.9 FM, which airs a different programming schedule from this station.

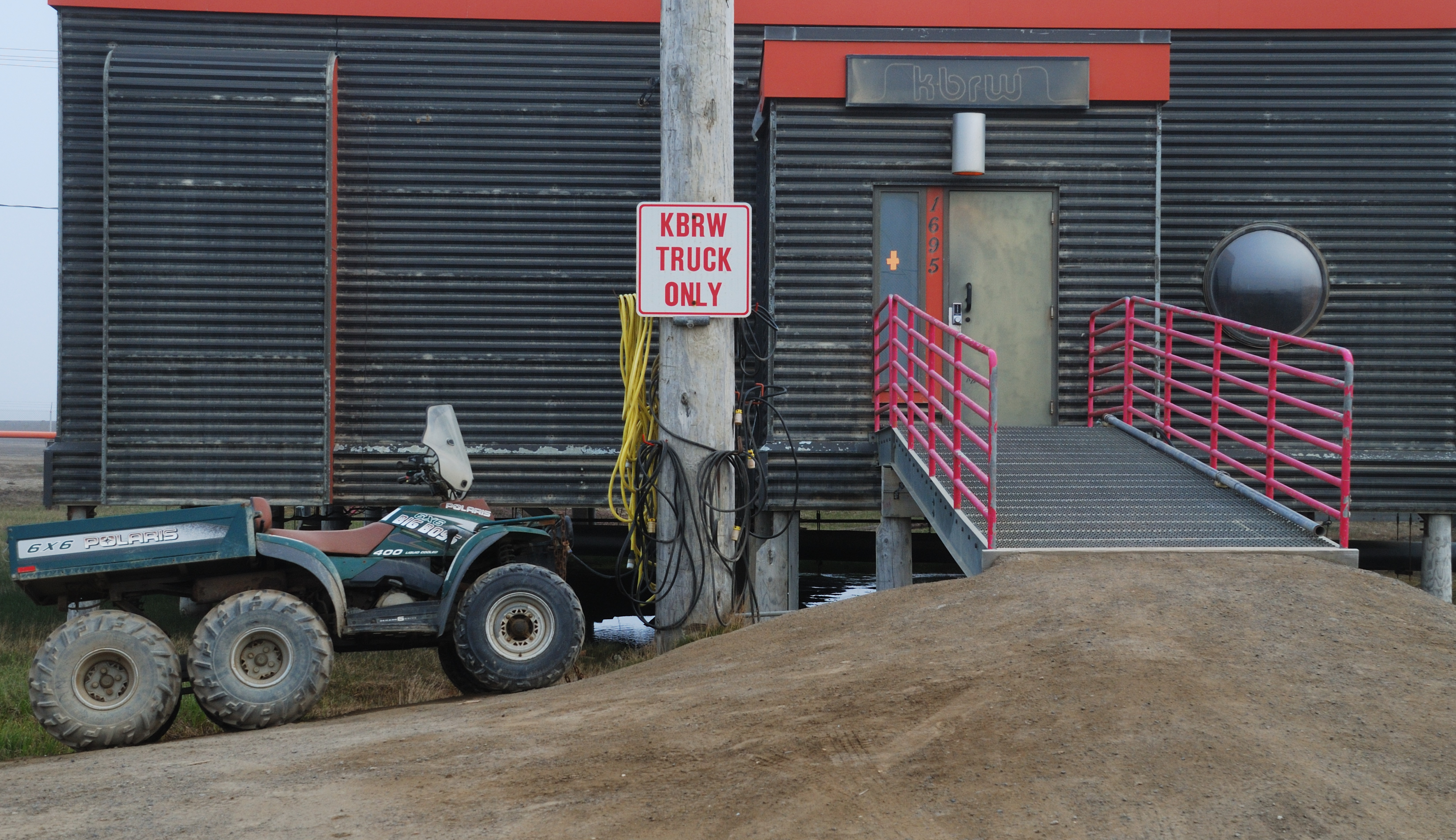
The station's studios in Barrow.

The KBRW broadcast stream on the Internet (www.kbrw.org and www.kbrwradio.org) is believed to be the northernmost source for broadcast streaming audio on Earth.

Earl Finkler, a longtime station staffer, became known beyond Barrow as an interviewer and commentator. His commentaries were aired on multiple public radio networks, and also appeared in the Arctic Sounder newspaper. He remains well known for his association with KBRW even after retiring to his home state of Wisconsin.

As early as January 1979, KBRW was the northernmost affiliate of the weekly chart show, American Top 40 with Casey Kasem, which is no longer heard on KBRW. KBRW's format is a variety of public radio, public and native affairs, religious programming, and popular music.

== Translators ==
Broadcast translators for KBRW
Call sign	Frequency	City of license	FID	ERP (W)	Class	FCC info
K201AG	88.1 FM	Nuiqsut, Alaska	60379	200	D	LMS
K201AH	88.1 FM	Kaktovik, Alaska	60378	39 horizontal	D	LMS
K201AV	88.1 FM	Point Lay, Alaska	60380	48 horizontal	D	LMS
K268AA	101.5 FM	Point Hope, Alaska	60373	17 horizontal	D	LMS
K268AB	101.5 FM	Anaktuvuk Pass, Alaska	60376	18 horizontal	D	LMS

== History ==
The station began broadcasting in December 22, 1975 on 680 AM with 1,000 watts. Smaller FM signals were added in 1988. The AM signal was upgraded to 10,000 watts in 1996. Shortly after the upgrade, a fire took the station off the air for several weeks. Thanks to the FM transmitters, broadcasting continued near the villages, while a new transmitter was installed to serve the outlying areas.
