= KPTZ =

Educational radio station in Washington state, U.S.

- Port Townsend, Washington; United States
- Broadcast area: Northwest Washington
- Frequency: 91.9 MHz

Programming
- Format: Free-form radio

Ownership
- Owner: Radio Port Townsend

Technical information
- Licensing authority: FCC
- Facility ID: 172517
- Class: A
- ERP: 1,950 watts
- HAAT: 108 meters
- Transmitter coordinates: 48°7′57.1″N 122°49′31.4″W

Links
- Public license information: Public file; LMS
- Website: www.kptz.org

KPTZ (91.9 FM) is a non-commercial educational radio station licensed to Port Townsend, Washington. KPTZ is on the air 24 hours a day, broadcasting a mix of locally originated programming featuring area people, art, activities and news. The station, owned by Radio Port Townsend, serves the Northwest Washington area..
