= KBKZ =

- Raton, New Mexico; United States
- Broadcast area: Colfax County
- Frequency: 96.5 MHz
- Branding: "Coyote Country 96.5"

Programming
- Format: Country
- Affiliations: ABC News Radio

Ownership
- Owner: Phillips Broadcasting Company, Inc.; (Phillips Broadcasting Company, Inc)
- Sister stations: KCRT-FM, KCRT-AM

History
- First air date: 2001

Technical information
- Licensing authority: FCC
- Facility ID: 78993
- Class: C2
- ERP: 5,400 watts
- HAAT: 295 meters (968 ft)
- Transmitter coordinates: 36°59′33″N 104°28′24″W
- Repeater: 100.9 K265EM (Trinidad)

Links
- Public license information: Public file; LMS
- Webcast: Listen live
- Website: kbkzradio.com

KBKZ (96.5 FM, "Coyote Country 96.5") is a radio station broadcasting a country music format. Licensed to Raton, New Mexico, United States, the station is currently owned by Phillips Broadcasting Company, Inc. and features programming from ABC News Radio.

== History ==
The Federal Communications Commission issued a construction permit for the station to David F. Phillips on November 23, 1998. The station was issued the KBKZ call sign on January 8, 1999. On February 12, 2001, the station's license was assigned by David Phillips to the current owner, Phillips Broadcasting. The station received its license to cover on March 20, 2001.
