= KQOH =

- Marshfield, Missouri; United States
- Frequency: 91.9 MHz
- Branding: The Journey

Programming
- Format: Religious

Ownership
- Owner: Catholic Radio Network, Inc.

History
- Former call signs: KNLM (1997–2013)

Technical information
- Licensing authority: FCC
- Facility ID: 76946
- Class: A
- ERP: 1,750 watts
- HAAT: 76.0 meters (249.3 ft)
- Transmitter coordinates: 37°19′1.00″N 92°57′51.00″W

Links
- Public license information: Public file; LMS
- Website: Official website

KQOH (91.9 FM) is a radio station broadcasting a Religious format. Licensed to Marshfield, Missouri, United States, the station is currently owned by Catholic Radio Network, Inc.
