= WDSV =

- Greenville, Mississippi; United States
- Broadcast area: Washington County, Mississippi
- Frequency: 91.9 MHz
- Branding: 91.9 WDSV

Programming
- Format: Community radio
- Affiliations: Pacifica Radio Network

Ownership
- Owner: Delta Foundation, Inc.

History
- Call sign meaning: Delta Sounds and Voices

Technical information
- Licensing authority: FCC
- Facility ID: 175995
- Class: A
- ERP: 1,500 watts
- HAAT: 105 metres (344 ft)
- Transmitter coordinates: 33°24′21″N 90°59′30″W

Links
- Public license information: Public file; LMS
- Website: wdsv919.org

WDSV (91.9 FM) is a radio station licensed to serve the community of Greenville, Mississippi. The station is owned by Delta Foundation, Inc., and airs a community radio format.

The station was assigned the WDSV call letters by the Federal Communications Commission on December 22, 2008.
