= KACS =

- Chehalis, Washington; United States
- Broadcast area: Olympia, Washington
- Frequency: 90.5 MHz
- Branding: Family Friendly Radio

Programming
- Format: Christian Radio

Ownership
- Owner: Chehalis Valley Educational Foundation

History
- First air date: August 18, 1993

Technical information
- Licensing authority: FCC
- Facility ID: 10685
- Class: C2
- ERP: 700 watts
- HAAT: 697 meters (2,287 ft)
- Transmitter coordinates: 46°58′22.4″N 123°08′22.1″W
- Translators: (88.3 MHz) K202ER (Astoria, OR); 97.9 K250BB (Packwood); 102.3 K272EP (Chehalis); 106.5 K293AY (Enumclaw); 106.9 K295BO (Aberdeen)
- Repeater: 91.3 KACW (South Bend)

Links
- Public license information: Public file; LMS
- Webcast: Listen Live
- Website: kacs.org

KACS (90.5 FM) is the main station signal of a local listener-supported non-commercial independent radio network broadcasting a Christian format. Licensed to Chehalis, Washington, United States, it serves the Olympia area. As of 2025, the network is currently owned by Chehalis Valley Educational Foundation.

== Translators ==
In addition to the main station, KACS is relayed by KACW 91.3 in South Bend, Washington, and by KBSG 90.1 in Raymond, Washington, as well as additional translators to widen its broadcast area.

Call sign	Frequency	City of license	FID	ERP (W)	Class	FCC info
KACW	91.3 FM	South Bend, Washington	173182	225	A	LMS
K250BB	97.9 FM	Packwood, Washington	37181	41 vertical	D	LMS
K272EP	102.3 FM	Chehalis, Washington	142657	205	D	LMS
K293AY	106.5 FM	Enumclaw, Washington	155196	10	D	LMS
K295BO	106.9 FM	Aberdeen, Washington	24918	125 horizontal	D	LMS
