= KATX =

Eastland, Texas; United States
- Broadcast area: Eastland/Ranger, Texas
- Frequency: 97.7 MHz

Programming
- Language: English
- Format: Classic hits
- Affiliations: Westwood One

Ownership
- Owner: Terry Slavens; (For the Love of the Game Broadcasting, LLC)
- Sister stations: KWBY-FM

History
- First air date: 1987 (as KEAS-FM)
- Former call signs: KEAS-FM (1987–2000)
- Call sign meaning: K-All-TeXas

Technical information
- Licensing authority: FCC
- Facility ID: 71352
- Class: A
- ERP: 3,000 watts
- HAAT: 62 meters (203 ft)
- Transmitter coordinates: 32°23′47″N 98°46′26″W

Links
- Public license information: Public file; LMS
- Webcast: Listen Live
- Website: katxradio.com

KATX (97.7 FM) is an American radio station with a classic hits format licensed to and serving the area around Eastland, Texas. The station's broadcast license is currently held by Terry Slavens, through licensee For the Love of the Game Broadcasting, LLC.

KATX celebrated 25 years as an FM broadcast station in 2013. The license for 97.7 FM was established in January 1988 and launched playing Top 40 Country with a mix of traditional country, local news, sports, community events and the "Bargain Box".

KATX is staffed by general manager Terry Slavens, news and senior broadcaster Mike Cockburn, Operations Manager Stace Gaddy and Blakeney French Hodges.

The station is a former affiliate of the Dallas Cowboys radio network.
