= KKSB =

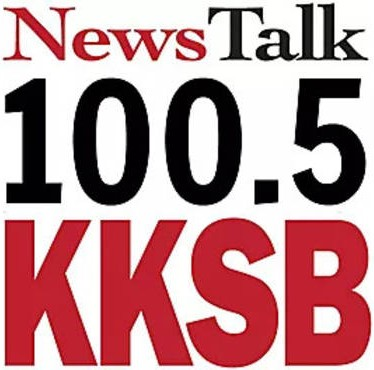
- Steamboat Springs, Colorado; United States
- Frequency: 1230 kHz
- Branding: NewsTalk 100.5

Programming
- Format: News/Talk

Ownership
- Owner: Don Tlapek; (Blizzard Broadcasting LLC)
- Sister stations: KBCR-FM

History
- First air date: April, 1977 (as KBCR)
- Former call signs: KBCR (1977–1995); KSBT (1995–1996); KBCR (1996–2015); KBWZ (2015–2017); KCOQ (2017–2018); KTYV (6/1/2018-6/11/2018)

Technical information
- Licensing authority: FCC
- Facility ID: 63191
- Class: C
- Power: 1,000 watts unlimited
- Transmitter coordinates: 40°29′19″N 106°50′57″W
- Translators: (99.5 MHz) K258DK (Steamboat Springs); 100.5 K263AC (Canyon Valley)

Links
- Public license information: Public file; LMS
- Website: www.steamboatradio.com/stations/kksb/

KKSB is a radio station licensed and broadcasting to Steamboat Springs, Colorado, on 1230 kHz AM. The station airs a news/talk format and is currently owned by Don Tlapek, through licensee Blizzard Broadcasting LLC.

== History ==
The station went on the air in 1977. On November 15, 1996, the station changed its call sign from KSBT to KBCR. On January 13, 2015, the call sign was changed from KBCR to KBWZ, and on October 24, 2017, from KBWZ to KCOQ. On June 1, 2018, the station changed its call sign to KTYV. On June 11, 2018, KTYV changed their call sign to KKSB and changed their format to news/talk on June 18.
