= KAKN =

Coordinates: 58°44′33″N 156°58′39″W

- Naknek, Alaska; United States
- Broadcast area: Alaska Bush
- Frequency: 100.9 (MHz)
- Branding: Victory Radio

Programming
- Format: Religious

Ownership
- Owner: Bay Broadcasting

Technical information
- Licensing authority: FCC
- Class: A
- ERP: 3,000 watts
- HAAT: 91 meters
- Repeaters: KAKD (104.9 MHz, Dillingham)

Links
- Public license information: Public file; LMS

KAKN is a commercial Christian radio station airing Contemporary Christian music and Southern gospel music, along with Christian Talk Shows in Naknek, Alaska, broadcasting on 100.9 FM.

== Translators ==
In addition to the main station, KAKN is relayed by an additional two translators to widen its broadcast area.

Call sign	Frequency	City of license	FID	ERP (W)	Class	FCC info
K280FE	103.9 FM	Egegik, Alaska	138011	100	D	LMS
K275AW	102.9 FM	Manokotak, Alaska	141256	100	D	LMS

KAKN is also simulcast in Dillingham, Alaska on sister station KAKD and in Igiugig, Alaska on KIGI (104.9 MHz).
