= KBNX =

Simulcast with KCXX Comanche
- Bangs, Texas; United States
- Broadcast area: Bangs, Texas; Brownwood, Texas; Coleman, Texas
- Frequencies: 97.9 MHz; 103.9 MHz (KCXX)
- Branding: 97.9 & 103.9 Sunny FM

Programming
- Language: English
- Format: Classic hits

Ownership
- Owner: William W. McCutchen III

History
- First air date: 2016

Technical information
- Licensing authority: FCC
- Facility ID: 191503
- Class: A
- ERP: 1200 watts
- HAAT: 111.2 meters
- Transmitter coordinates: 31.7238°N 99.0978°W

Links
- Public license information: Public file; LMS
- Website: Official Facebook Page

KBNX (97.9 FM, "97.9 & 103.9 Sunny FM") is a radio station with a classic hits music format owned by William W. McCutchen III. It is licensed to Bangs, Texas.
