= WMEB-FM =

Radio station in Orono, Maine

- Orono, Maine; United States
- Broadcast area: Penobscot County, Maine
- Frequency: 91.9 FM

Programming
- Format: College radio

Ownership
- Owner: University of Maine

History
- First air date: October 1, 1962
- Call sign meaning: "Maine Educational Broadcasting"

Technical information
- Licensing authority: FCC
- Facility ID: 69267
- Class: B1
- ERP: 10,000 watts
- HAAT: 52 meters (171 ft)
- Transmitter coordinates: 44.919°N 68.666°W

Links
- Public license information: Public file; LMS

WMEB-FM is a non-commercial radio station owned and operated by the University of Maine, broadcasting on 91.9 FM from its campus in Orono and a transmitter located in Old Town. The station is run by university students and programs an alternative rock music format.

== History ==
=== Early years ===
In October 1961, the University of Maine (UMO) applied for a construction permit to build a new FM station in Orono, which would broadcast with an effective radiated power of 375 watts; this was granted by the Federal Communications Commission (FCC) on January 10, 1962. Going on the air as WMEB-FM from studios in Stevens Hall, the station began broadcasts on October 1, 1962.

WMEB-FM represented the third generation of broadcasting at UMO. The first station on the campus, WGBX, broadcast from 1926 to 1928 and featured programming mostly presented by faculty. In 1953, after three years of technical and funding setbacks, WORO, a carrier current station, was established, but this proved impractical to maintain as more students and faculty lived off campus. The format, typical of 1960s college radio stations, featured a mix of talk and music shows; in 1964, the music played on WMEB-FM consisted of an hour of easy listening programming and three hours a day of classical music, supplemented by an hour of campus and local news. In 1968, WMEB-FM broadcast a 15-week radio course, "Understanding Music", from the university's continuing education division.

=== Increasing student involvement ===
The University of Maine started a second radio station on September 14, 1970: WMEH, the first transmitter in today's Maine Public Radio network. The introduction of a public radio service led to the specialization of WMEB as a student-run station. In 1971, it began overnight broadcasting on the weekends, and all but two of its programs that fall were student-produced. Alongside a steady expansion of the station's broadcasting hours and of the Stevens Hall studios came a weekend block of progressive rock music, which was starting to displace the existing easy listening programming.

In the second half of the 1970s, WMEB-FM was hit by financial woes. The university's department of broadcasting and the student senate both thought the other should be primarily responsible for funding the station. In October 1979, students staged an 86-hour "Beggar's Banquet" radiothon to raise money for station operations. The "Banquet" was not even the only marathon broadcast that WMEB aired that semester: in December, one disc jockey pulled a 100-hour shift that raised more than $5,000 for starving Cambodians. In the late 1970s, the station also had trouble keeping itself on the right side of the law: in the days when radio stations needed licensed operators, a shortage of them caused the station to be in violation of FCC rules for 15 hours a week. A report in The Maine Campus, the student newspaper at UMO, was sent to the FCC, leading to a surprise inspection of the station, a reprimand and a temporary cutback in broadcasting. In the 1980s and 1990s, WMEB organized a college hockey rankings poll, having taken it over from WDOM at Providence College in Rhode Island.

By the 1990s, WMEB was firmly established as an alternative music outlet with specialty programming in other genres. During the alternative music blocks, DJs played music from three different colored bins, featuring new releases and local artists; moderately successful songs; and popular mainstream artists in the alternative genre. In 1995, the station shut down for five days and removed one student DJ who was dismissed for making provocative racist and homophobic remarks.

=== Transmitter relocations and power increase ===
The original 1962 transmitter was replaced in 1997, at a time when there was concern for the station's future because the University of Maine had dropped its broadcasting major. However, despite already having moved the transmitter, university laboratories were receiving interference from the station; signal leakage into Bennett Hall caused frequency measuring equipment in physics labs to be unable to pick up any other signals. The next year, to rectify the interference issue, WMEB moved to a new and taller tower, which came alongside a slight power increase. The studios moved from the East Annex, where they had been moved initially on a temporary basis in 1981, to the Student Union in 2003.

In 2009, the station boosted its power to 10,000 watts from a new transmitter site at the university-owned Witter Farm in Old Town; the increase filled coverage gaps in Bangor and extended coverage. The station suffered a fire at its transmitter site in January 2018, which would keep the station off the air for more than three months until it returned at reduced power in April.

== See also ==
- Campus radio
- List of college radio stations in the United States
