= WJIF =

- Opp, Alabama; United States
- Broadcast area: Enterprise, Alabama
- Frequency: 91.9 MHz

Programming
- Format: Religious

Ownership
- Owner: Opp Educational Broadcasting Foundation

History
- First air date: 1986
- Call sign meaning: Where Joy Is Found

Technical information
- Licensing authority: FCC
- Facility ID: 50392
- Class: A
- ERP: 380 watts
- HAAT: 50 meters (164 feet)
- Transmitter coordinates: 31°15′50″N 86°13′26″W

Links
- Public license information: Public file; LMS
- Webcast: Shoutcast

WJIF (91.9 FM) is a radio station licensed to serve Opp, Alabama, United States. The station is owned by Opp Educational Broadcasting Foundation.

WJIF broadcasts a religious radio format.

In September 2009, WJIF was fined $19,000 by the FCC for failing to maintain EAS equipment and conduct tests of the emergency system, as well as for failing to reply to the commission.

== History ==
This station received its original construction permit from the Federal Communications Commission on March 25, 1985. The new station was assigned the call letters WJIF by the FCC on July 1, 1985. WJIF received its license to cover from the FCC on August 17, 1987.
