= KCRT (AM) =

- Trinidad, Colorado; United States
- Broadcast area: Las Animas County
- Frequency: 1240 kHz
- Branding: My 99.3

Programming
- Format: Adult hits
- Affiliations: ABC News Radio

Ownership
- Owner: Phillips Broadcasting, Inc.; (Phillips)
- Sister stations: KCRT-FM, KBKZ

History
- First air date: 1946
- Call sign meaning: Corley Radio Trinidad

Technical information
- Licensing authority: FCC
- Facility ID: 52475
- Class: C
- Power: 250 watts (unlimited)
- Transmitter coordinates: 37°08′45″N 104°30′42″W
- Translator: 99.3 K257FE (Trinidad)

Links
- Public license information: Public file; LMS
- Webcast: Listen live
- Website: kcrtradio.com

KCRT (1240 AM, "My 99.3") is a radio station broadcasting a variety hits format. Licensed to Trinidad, Colorado, United States, the station is currently owned by Phillips Broadcasting, Inc. and features programming from ABC News Radio.

== History ==
On March 3, 2017, KCRT changed their format from classic country to variety hits, branded as "My 99.3".
