= KJAL =

Radio station in Tafuna, American Samoa (2002–2014)

- Tafuna, American Samoa; American Samoa
- Broadcast area: American Samoa
- Frequency: 585 kHz

Programming
- Format: Defunct (formerly religious)

Ownership
- Owner: Asia Pacific Media Ministries; (District Council of the Assemblies of God in American Samoa)

History
- First air date: 2002
- Last air date: February 1, 2014
- Former call signs: WDJD

Technical information
- Facility ID: 129125
- Class: B
- Power: 5,000 watts (unlimited)
- Transmitter coordinates: 14°21′28″S 170°46′36″W

KJAL (585 AM) was a radio station broadcasting a religious radio format. Licensed to Tafuna, American Samoa, it served the American Samoa area. The station was owned by Asia Pacific Media Ministries and licensed to the District Council of the Assemblies of God in American Samoa.

The station signed on in 2002 as WDJD but was forced by the FCC to change to a "K" callsign to conform with most other U.S.-licensed radio stations located in the Pacific. The station was assigned the KJAL call letters by the Federal Communications Commission on September 12, 2002.

The station had filed an application with the FCC to change its licensed broadcast frequency from 585 kHz to 630 kHz.

The station's license was cancelled by the FCC on February 1, 2014, for failure to file an application for license renewal.
