= KCKB (FM) =

Radio station in Moran, Texas

Coordinates: 32.541389°N 99.057778°W

- Moran, Texas; United States
- Broadcast area: Breckenridge, Texas; Eastland, Texas; Albany, Texas
- Frequency: 104.1 MHz

Programming
- Format: Christian/Talk radio
- Affiliations: Rangers Radio Network

Ownership
- Owner: Positive Radio Network, LLC
- Sister stations: KBLY

History
- First air date: February 1, 2019

Technical information
- Licensing authority: FCC
- Facility ID: 198776
- Class: C3
- ERP: 25,000 watts
- HAAT: 78 meters (256 ft)

Links
- Public license information: Public file; LMS
- Webcast: Listen live
- Website: https://www.positiveradio.net/

KCKB (104.1 MHz) is a radio station licensed to Moran, Texas. The station airs a Christian format, along with secular conservative talk programs. It is owned by Positive Radio Network, LLC. It is an affiliate of the Rangers Radio Network.

== History ==
The construction permit for KCKB was granted February 28, 2017 and was held by Brazos TV, Inc. The permit was sold later that year to Two Way Communications for $10,000. In 2018, the permit for KCKB was sold to Positive Radio Network, LLC, along with KBLY, for $87,000. The station began broadcasting on February 1, 2019.
