= KBCR-FM =

- Steamboat Springs, Colorado; United States
- Frequency: 96.9 MHz
- Branding: Big Country Radio

Programming
- Format: Country
- Affiliations: ABC Radio

Ownership
- Owner: Don Tlapek; (Blizzard Broadcasting LLC)
- Sister stations: KKSB

History
- First air date: 1974
- Former call signs: KBCR-FM (1974–1981); KSBT (1981–1995)
- Call sign meaning: Big Country Radio

Technical information
- Licensing authority: FCC
- Facility ID: 63190
- Class: C2
- ERP: 27,500 watts
- HAAT: 203 meters
- Transmitter coordinates: 40°27′43″N 106°50′57″W

Links
- Public license information: Public file; LMS
- Website: kbcr.com

KBCR-FM (96.9 FM, "Big Country Radio") is a radio station licensed and broadcasting to Steamboat Springs, Colorado, USA. The station broadcasts a country music format and is currently owned by Don Tlapek, through licensee Blizzard Broadcasting LLC.

== History ==
The station went on the air as KBCR-FM in 1974. On August 17, 1981, the station changed its call sign to KSBT. It reverted to the KBCR-FM calls on May 15, 1995.

== Awards and honors ==
In 2007, KBCR's music director, Debbie Duncan, was recognized by New Music Weekly magazine as the Country Music Director of the Year at the New Music Awards.
