= KCGC (FM) =

Radio station in Merino–Sterling, Colorado

Coordinates: 40°31′57.0″N 103°7′23.8″W

- Merino, Colorado; United States
- Broadcast area: Sterling, Colorado
- Frequency: 94.5 MHz
- Branding: The Ranch

Programming
- Format: Country music

Ownership
- Owner: Northeast Colorado Broadcasting, LLC

History
- Former call signs: KRGQ (2008–2009); KBNX (2009); KRFD (2009–2015)

Technical information
- Licensing authority: FCC
- Facility ID: 164299
- Class: C3
- ERP: 15,000 watts
- HAAT: 124 meters (407 ft)

Links
- Public license information: Public file; LMS
- Website: 945theranch.com

KCGC (94.5 FM) is a radio station licensed to Merino, Colorado. The station broadcasts a country music format and is owned by Northeast Colorado Broadcasting, LLC.
