= KOTZ =

Coordinates: 66°50′19.6″N 162°34′15.1″W

- Kotzebue, Alaska; United States
- Broadcast area: Alaska Bush
- Frequencies: 720 kHz (HD Radio)
- Branding: KOTZ

Programming
- Format: Variety
- Affiliations: NPR; Alaska Public Media

Ownership
- Owner: Kotzebue Broadcasting, Inc.
- Sister stations: KINU-FM

Technical information
- Licensing authority: FCC
- Class: A
- Power: 10,000 watts
- Repeater: 89.9 KINU

Links
- Public license information: Public file; LMS
- Webcast: Listen Live
- Website: www.kotz.org

KOTZ is a non-commercial radio station in Kotzebue, Alaska, broadcasting on 720 AM.

== Translators ==
Broadcast translators for KOTZ
Call sign	Frequency	City of license	FID	ERP (W)	Class	FCC info
KBUQ	91.9 FM	Buckland, Alaska	180899	10 vertical	D	LMS
KDRG	91.9 FM	Deering, Alaska	180900	10 vertical	D	LMS
KIAN	91.9 FM	Kiana, Alaska	180910	10 vertical	D	LMS
KIEA	91.9 FM	Selawik, Alaska	180909	10 vertical	D	LMS
KQVK	91.9 FM	Kivalina, Alaska	180889	10 vertical	D	LMS
KUUK	91.9 FM	Noatak, Alaska	180838	10 vertical	D	LMS
KZNC	91.9 FM	Red Dog Mine, Alaska	180952	10 vertical	D	LMS
KZNR	91.1 FM	Red Dog Mine, Alaska	180911	10 horizontal	D	LMS
K203AP	88.5 FM	Ambler, Alaska	35437	17 horizontal	D	LMS
K204AS	88.7 FM	Shungnak, Alaska	35441	18 horizontal	D	LMS
K205BC	88.9 FM	Kobuk, Alaska	35439	17 horizontal	D	LMS
