= KBTP (FM) =

- Mertzon, Texas; United States
- Broadcast area: San Angelo, Texas; Concho Valley
- Frequency: 101.1 MHz
- Branding: 101.1 The Bull

Programming
- Format: Country

Ownership
- Owner: Waco Entertainment Group, LLC
- Sister stations: KBJX

History
- First air date: 2016

Technical information
- Licensing authority: FCC
- Facility ID: 198734
- Class: C2
- ERP: 11,000 watts
- HAAT: 200 meters (660 ft)
- Transmitter coordinates: 31°25′16.60″N 100°32′37.30″W

Links
- Public license information: Public file; LMS
- Webcast: Listen live

KBTP (101.1 FM, "The Bull") is a country music formatted broadcast radio station. The station is licensed to Mertzon, Texas and serves San Angelo and the Concho Valley in Texas. KBTP is owned and operated by Waco Entertainment Group, LLC.
