= KSDP (AM) =

- Sand Point, Alaska; United States
- Broadcast area: Aleutians East
- Frequency: 830 kHz
- Branding: KSDP Radio

Programming
- Format: Public Radio; Full Service
- Affiliations: Alaska Public Radio Network; National Public Radio

Ownership
- Owner: Aleutian Peninsula Broadcasting, Inc.

History
- First air date: 1983
- Call sign meaning: Sand Point

Technical information
- Licensing authority: FCC
- Facility ID: 943
- Class: B
- Power: 1,000 watts (unlimited)
- Transmitter coordinates: 55°20′58″N 160°28′21.2″W

Links
- Public license information: Public file; LMS
- Webcast: Listen live
- Website: KSDP Online

KSDP is a Public Radio and Full Service formatted broadcast radio station licensed to Sand Point, Alaska, serving Aleutians East. KSDP is owned and operated by Aleutian Peninsula Broadcasting, Inc.

Call sign	Frequency	City of license	FID	ERP (W)	HAAT	Class	FCC info
K201DA	88.1 FM	King Cove, Alaska	16933	250 vertical	12 m (39 ft)	D	LMS
