= KASU =

Radio station at Arkansas State University

- Jonesboro, Arkansas; United States
- Frequency: 91.9 MHz
- Branding: 91.9 KASU

Programming
- Format: Public radio
- Affiliations: NPR, APM

Ownership
- Owner: Arkansas State University

History
- First air date: May 17, 1957
- Call sign meaning: Arkansas State University

Technical information
- Licensing authority: FCC
- Facility ID: 2785
- Class: C1
- ERP: 100,000 watts
- HAAT: 210 meters (690 ft)
- Transmitter coordinates: 35°53′27″N 90°40′26″W

Links
- Public license information: Public file; LMS
- Webcast: Listen live
- Website: kasu.org

KASU (91.9 FM) is a non-commercial radio station licensed to Jonesboro, Arkansas, United States, and owned by Arkansas State University. Established in 1957, the station serves parts of northeastern Arkansas, southeastern Missouri and western Tennessee.

On March 28, 2020, an EF3 tornado directly struck Jonesboro destroying the transmitter site for the station.

== Emergency Alert System ==
KASU is the primary source of messages distributed through the Emergency Alert System in northeast Arkansas. KAIT relays KASU’s signal for tests and KJNB-CD relays KASU’s signal for actual emergencies.
