= KBJX (FM) =

- Mertzon, Texas; United States
- Broadcast area: San Angelo, Texas
- Frequency: 103.5 MHz
- Branding: 103.5 Jack FM

Programming
- Format: Adult hits

Ownership
- Owner: William W. McCutchen, III
- Sister stations: KBTP

History
- First air date: September 28, 2016
- Call sign meaning: Jack FM

Technical information
- Licensing authority: FCC
- Facility ID: 191504
- Class: C2
- ERP: 25,000 watts
- HAAT: 212.7 meters (698 ft)
- Transmitter coordinates: 31°16′40.70″N 100°51′43.40″W

Links
- Public license information: Public file; LMS
- Webcast: Listen live

KBJX is an adult hits formatted broadcast radio station. The station is licensed to Mertzon, Texas, and serves San Angelo in Texas. KBJX is owned and operated by William W. McCutchen, III.
