= KWBY-FM =

- Ranger, Texas; United States
- Broadcast area: Brownwood, Texas
- Frequency: 98.5 MHz
- Branding: 98.5 KWBY Country

Programming
- Format: Country
- Affiliations: Westwood One

Ownership
- Owner: Terry Slavens; (For the Love of the Game Broadcasting, LLC)
- Sister stations: KATX

History
- First air date: 1990 (as KCUB-FM)
- Former call signs: KVQC (1989–1990); KCUB (2/1990-6/1990); KCUB-FM (1990–2011); KWBY-FM (2011–2012); KLQM (2012–2013)

Technical information
- Licensing authority: FCC
- Facility ID: 53961
- Class: A
- ERP: 5,800 watts
- HAAT: 102 meters (335 ft)
- Transmitter coordinates: 32°20′48″N 98°42′50″W

Links
- Public license information: Public file; LMS
- Webcast: Listen live
- Website: kwbyradio.com

KWBY-FM (98.5 MHz) is a radio station licensed to Ranger, Texas, United States. The station serves the Eastland, Erath and Comanche County areas. The station is currently owned by Terry Slavens, through licensee For the Love of the Game Broadcasting, LLC. Studios are located in Dublin, TX, and the transmitter site is southeast of Eastland, near Lake Leon in Eastland County.

The station plays a country music format provided by Westwood One and plays Texas State Network content.

== History ==
The station was assigned the call letters KVQC on October 31, 1989. On February 6, 1990, the station changed its call sign to KCUB, on June 21, 1990 to KCUB-FM, on May 9, 2011 to KWBY-FM, on October 11, 2012 to KLQM, and on February 19, 2013 to the current KWBY-FM.

On January 1, 2018 KWBY-FM changed their format from classic rock to country.
