= KAVX =

- Lufkin, Texas; United States
- Frequency: 91.9 MHz

Programming
- Format: Religious

Ownership
- Owner: Lufkin Educational Broadcasting Foundation

History
- First air date: 1998
- Call sign meaning: A Voice to X (Christ)

Technical information
- Licensing authority: FCC
- Facility ID: 82087
- Class: C2
- ERP: 23,000 watts
- HAAT: 222 meters (728 ft)
- Transmitter coordinates: 31°22′08″N 94°38′45″W

Links
- Public license information: Public file; LMS
- Website: kavx.org

KAVX (91.9 FM) is a radio station licensed to Lufkin, Texas, United States. The station is owned by Lufkin Educational Broadcasting Foundation.

KAVX broadcasts a religious radio format.

The station was assigned the KAVX call sign by the Federal Communications Commission on June 27, 1997.
