= KBWE =

- Burley, Idaho; United States
- Frequency: 91.9 MHz
- Branding: Voz Latina KBWE 91.9 FM

Programming
- Format: Spanish/English community radio

Ownership
- Owner: Tu Voz, Inc.

History
- First air date: May 18, 2011

Technical information
- Licensing authority: FCC
- Facility ID: 173150
- Class: A
- ERP: 4,900 watts
- HAAT: 12 metres (39 ft)
- Transmitter coordinates: 42°33′31.7″N 113°44′53.1″W

Links
- Public license information: Public file; LMS
- Website: kbwe.org

KBWE (91.9 FM, "Voz Latina KBWE 91.9 FM") is a radio station licensed to serve the community of Burley, Idaho. The station is owned by Tu Voz, Inc., and airs a bilingual Spanish/English community radio format.

The station was assigned the KBWE call letters by the Federal Communications Commission on May 18, 2011.
