= KCNN (FM) =

KCFL (Formerly KCNN, KAVV)
- Benson, Arizona; United States
- Broadcast area: Cochise County; Pima County
- Frequency: 97.7 MHz (HD Radio)
- Branding: Cool Country 97.7

Programming
- Format: Country
- Subchannels: HD2: Oldies "Cool FM" Classic Hits
- Affiliations: Fox News Radio

Ownership
- Owner: CoolFM Live LLC; (CoolFM Live LLC)

History
- First air date: April 1983
- Former call signs: KAVV (1979–2022) also KCNN
- Call sign meaning: "Cool Country" named after Coolfmlive Social Media to match brand.

Technical information
- Licensing authority: FCC
- Facility ID: 63338
- Class: C3
- ERP: 25,000 watts
- HAAT: 45 meters (148 ft)
- Transmitter coordinates: 31°59′29″N 110°10′21″W
- Translator: 104.1 K281CC (Benson)

Links
- Public license information: (Formerly KCNN, KAVV) Public file; LMS
- Website: https://coolfmonline.com/ coolfmonline.com] (HD2)

KCFL (97.7 FM) is a country music formatted broadcast radio station licensed to Benson, Arizona, serving western Cochise County and eastern Pima County. KCFL is owned and operated by licensee CoolFM Live LLC.

== History ==
A construction permit for a new radio station in Benson was issued in December 1977, with the callsign being awarded in 1979. After several time extensions, KAVV came to air in April 1983.

Founder of KAVV, Paul Lotsof died August 2022; his estate would then begin the process of selling the stations in his Stereo 97, Inc. company, including KAVV, which would be sold to Redrock Media Group LLC, who relaunched the station, shifting from the obscure classic country format KAVV to one with more modern country music, now Legendary Country rebranding as "Canyon Country 97.7" under new call-sign KCNN. Redrock Media has received FCC approval for a class upgrade to C-3 25kW and also a Construction Permit allowing a booster FM transmitter to serve the Tucson market. Nielsen has ranked KCNN as number one in several key Cochise County demographics.

In early 2024 Redrock acquired KDAP and KAPR Douglas, Arizona. The Food City Plaza on West Fry in Sierra Vista Arizona houses store front studios for the KCNN operation. The Federal Communications Commission issued the call sign change effective January 26, 2023.
