= KCXX (FM) =

Coordinates: 31.8981°N 98.5994°W

KCXX-FM
Simulcast with KBNX Bangs
- Comanche, Texas; United States
- Broadcast area: Comanche, Texas
- Frequency: 103.9 MHz
- Branding: 97.9 & 103.9 Sunny FM

Programming
- Language: English
- Format: Classic hits

Ownership
- Owner: William W. McCutchen III

History
- First air date: 2016

Technical information
- Licensing authority: FCC
- Facility ID: 191506
- Class: A
- ERP: 350 watts
- HAAT: 5 meters

Links
- Public license information: Public file; LMS
- Website: Official Facebook Page

KCXX-FM (103.9 FM, "97.9 & 103.9 Sunny FM") is a radio station with a classic hits music format. Owned by William W. McCutchen III, it is licensed to Comanche, Texas.
