= KCKR =

- Church Point, Louisiana; United States
- Broadcast area: Lafayette, Louisiana
- Frequency: 91.9 MHz
- Branding: SonLife Radio Network

Programming
- Format: Religious

Ownership
- Owner: Jimmy Swaggart Ministries; (Family Worship Center Church, Inc.)

Technical information
- Licensing authority: FCC
- Facility ID: 83852
- Class: C3
- ERP: 12,500 watts
- HAAT: 141.9 meters (466 ft)
- Transmitter coordinates: 30°19′47″N 92°05′06″W

Links
- Public license information: Public file; LMS
- Website: sonlifetv.com

KCKR (91.9 FM) is a radio station broadcasting a religious format. Licensed to Church Point, Louisiana, United States, the station serves the Lafayette area. The station is currently owned by Family Worship Center Church, Inc.

== History ==
The station was assigned the call letters KCKR on October 23, 1996. On September 8, 2005, the station changed its call sign to the current KCKR. On March 27, 2007, the station was sold to Family Worship Center Church, Inc.
