= KCKV =

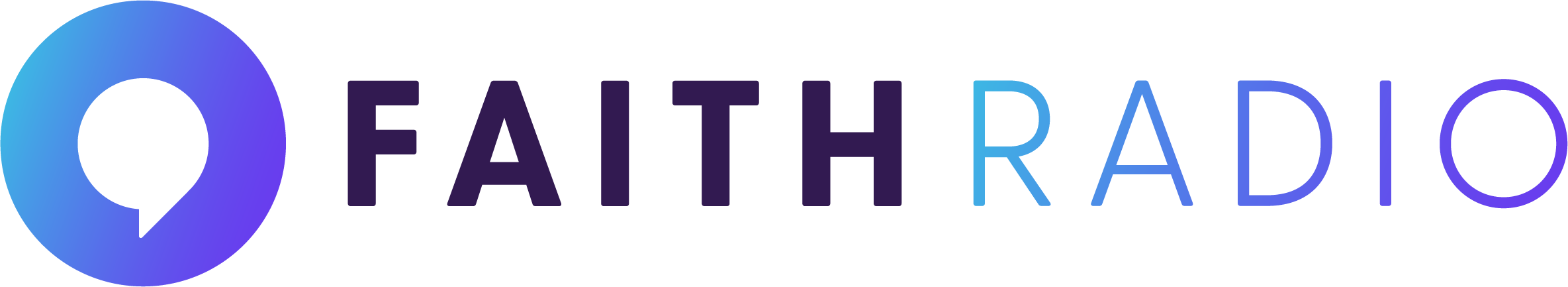
- Kirksville, Missouri; United States
- Frequency: 91.9 MHz
- Branding: Faith 91.9 FM

Programming
- Format: Christian radio

Ownership
- Owner: University of Northwestern – St. Paul

Technical information
- Licensing authority: FCC
- Facility ID: 87796
- Class: A
- ERP: 1,000 watts
- HAAT: 94 meters (308 ft)
- Transmitter coordinates: 40°13′46″N 92°32′36″W

Links
- Public license information: Public file; LMS
- Webcast: Listen live
- Website: myfaithradio.com

KCKV (91.9 FM) is a radio station broadcasting a Christian radio format, licensed to Kirksville, Missouri, United States. The station is currently owned by the University of Northwestern – St. Paul.
