= KBDD =

Coordinates: 37.382222°N 96.955556°W

- Winfield, Kansas; United States
- Broadcast area: Wichita metropolitan area
- Frequency: 91.9 MHz
- Branding: SonLife Radio

Programming
- Format: Christian radio
- Affiliations: SonLife Radio Network

Ownership
- Owner: Family Worship Center Church, Inc.

History
- First air date: 2000

Technical information
- Licensing authority: FCC
- Facility ID: 86319
- Class: C2
- ERP: 48,000 Watts
- HAAT: 150 meters (490 ft)

Links
- Public license information: Public file; LMS
- Webcast: Listen live
- Website: http://sonlifetv.com/

KBDD (91.9 MHz) is a Christian radio station licensed to Winfield, Kansas, and serving the Wichita metropolitan area. KBDD is owned and operated by Family Worship Center Church, Inc.

== History ==
The station began broadcasting in 2000, and was owned by the American Family Association. It was an affiliate of American Family Radio. In 2004, the station was sold to Family Worship Center Church for $1,150,000.
