= KBHL =

- Osakis, Minnesota; United States
- Broadcast area: Central Minnesota, Eastern SD, Southeastern ND, Minneapolis–Saint Paul
- Frequency: 103.9 MHz
- Branding: Praisefm

Programming
- Language: English
- Format: Worship music

Ownership
- Owner: Christian Heritage Broadcasting/North Central University

History
- First air date: 1985

Technical information
- Licensing authority: FCC
- Class: A
- ERP: 6,000 watts
- HAAT: 100 meters
- Transmitter coordinates: 45°50′23.9″N 95°5′57.1″W

Links
- Public license information: Public file; LMS
- Webcast: Listen Live!
- Website: http://www.praisefm.org

KBHL (103.9 FM, "praisefm") is a Contemporary Christian Music radio station in Osakis, Minnesota, United States, owned by Christian Heritage Broadcasting.

== Satellite and translator stations ==
Praisefm is rebroadcast on the following stations:

Call sign	Frequency	City of license	Facility ID	Class	ERP (W)	Height (m (ft))	Transmitter coordinates
KNOF	95.3 FM	Saint Paul, Minnesota	59624	A	900 (horizontal); 820 (vertical)	258 m (846 ft)	44°58′33.9″N 93°16′20.8″W
KCGN-FM	101.5 FM	Ortonville, Minnesota	8060	C	100,000	300 m (980 ft)	45°22′28.9″N 97°2′21.3″W
KBHZ	91.9 FM	Willmar, Minnesota	11043	C3	25,000	100 m (330 ft)	45°0′39.9″N 94°53′57″W

Praisefm is also heard on these translators:

Call sign	Frequency	City of license	FID	FCC info	Notes
K212FH	90.3 FM	Balaton, Minnesota	106648	LMS	Relays KBHL

== Africa ==
praisefm is partnered with Spirit FM, a network of five stations in Africa: three in Ghana, and two in Uganda. The Uganda stations also reach into the war-torn nation of Sudan to the north. There is another station in the process of being built in Sudan. praisefm contributes programming specially produced for broadcast on Spirit FM.

== History ==
=== Twin Cities signal ===
In 2008, praisefm began broadcasting its station on 95.3 MHz KNOF in the Twin Cities forming a partnership with North Central University. The studio is located on the campus of North Central University in downtown Minneapolis in the former Comm Arts building.

Selby Gospel Broadcasting Corporation eventually sold KNOF to Praise Broadcasting by June 2014.

In 2015, praisefm was approached by Northern Lights Broadcasting with a proposal to purchase KNOF. This purchase would allow praisefm to transfer their signal from 95.3FM to KTWN's 96.3 HD2, and increase their signal coverage to a greater portion of the Twin Cities area. On January 4, 2016, PraiseFM transferred their signal from KNOF 95.3 to KTWN 96.3 HD2. The sale to the Pohlad family (who also own the Minnesota Twins) netted praisefm nearly $8 million.

In 2019, KBHL rebranded as "PraiseLive" with no change in format. After the Pohlads sold their stations to the Educational Media Foundation in 2021, "PraiseLive" moved from KQGO 96.3 HD2 back to KNOF.

In 2025, "PraiseLive" returned to the name praisefm.
