= KCRT-FM =

- Trinidad, Colorado; United States
- Broadcast area: San Luis, Colorado
- Frequency: 92.5 MHz
- Branding: 92.5 The Mountain

Programming
- Format: Classic rock
- Affiliations: ABC News Radio

Ownership
- Owner: Phillips Broadcasting, Inc.
- Sister stations: KCRT, KBKZ

History
- First air date: 1977

Technical information
- Licensing authority: FCC
- Facility ID: 52478
- Class: C1
- ERP: 50,000 watts
- HAAT: 311 meters
- Transmitter coordinates: 36°59′33″N 104°28′24″W
- Translators: 92.9 K225AZ (Alamosa); 97.1 K246BP (Eagle Nest, New Mexico); 99.7 K259CJ (Raton, New Mexico); 100.3 K262BK (Trinidad); 106.7 K294BO (Monte Vista)

Links
- Public license information: Public file; LMS
- Webcast: Listen Live
- Website: KCRT-FM Online

KCRT-FM (92.5 MHz, "The Mountain") is a radio station broadcasting a classic rock music format. Licensed to Trinidad, Colorado, United States, the station is currently owned by Phillips Broadcasting, Inc.

As of September 28, 2020, KCRT-FM has added translator K294BO, broadcasting from Monte Vista, CO on 106.7 MHz. The FCC web site has not been updated to reflect this change as of September 28, 2020.
