= KBRW-FM =

Coordinates: 71°17′20″N 156°45′31″W

- Utqiaġvik, Alaska; United States
- Broadcast area: Alaska Bush
- Frequency: 91.9 MHz (HD Radio)
- Branding: KBRW

Programming
- Format: Public radio Public Affairs; Popular music Religious
- Affiliations: NPR; WFMT

Ownership
- Owner: Silakkuagvik Communications
- Sister stations: KBRW

History
- First air date: September 1, 1996
- Call sign meaning: BaRroW (city's former name)

Technical information
- Licensing authority: FCC
- Facility ID: 60382
- Class: A
- ERP: 890 watts
- HAAT: 22 meters (72 ft)

Links
- Public license information: Public file; LMS
- Webcast: Listen Live
- Website: kbrw.org

KBRW-FM is a non-commercial radio station in Utqiaġvik, Alaska, broadcasting on 91.9 MHz FM, and is located at 1695 Okpik Street, in a building that also contains studios for KBRW/680. The FM station airs public radio programming from the National Public Radio and WFMT networks. KBRW-FM also airs locally originated programming.

KBRW-FM broadcasts in stereo from a single transmitter and antenna located in Barrow, Alaska, and does not employ translator/relay stations or internet streaming.

KBRW-FM is licensed to broadcast in the HD (hybrid) format.

KBRW's format is a variety of public radio, public and native affairs, religious programming, and popular music.

== Gallery ==
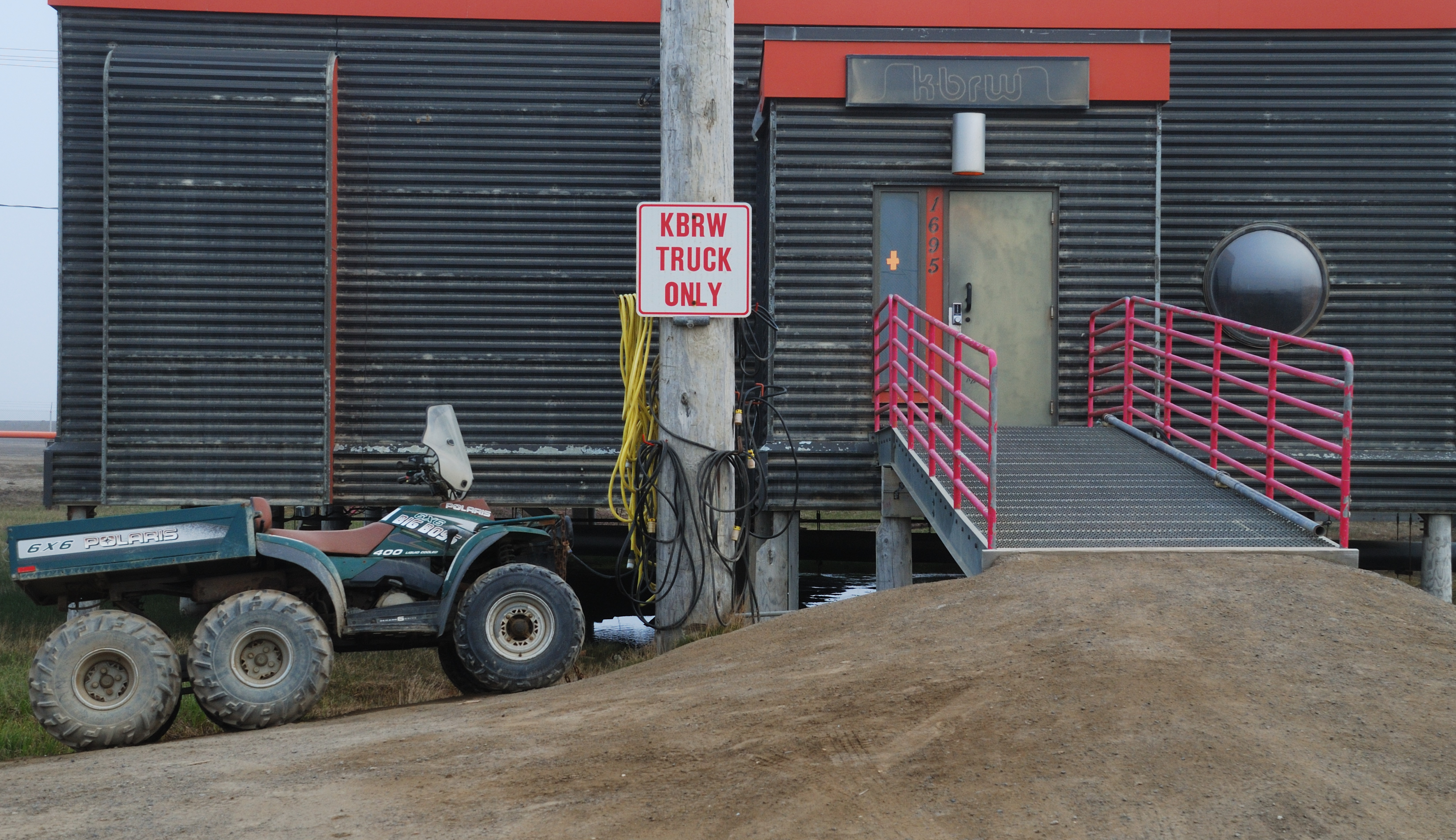
The station's studios in Barrow

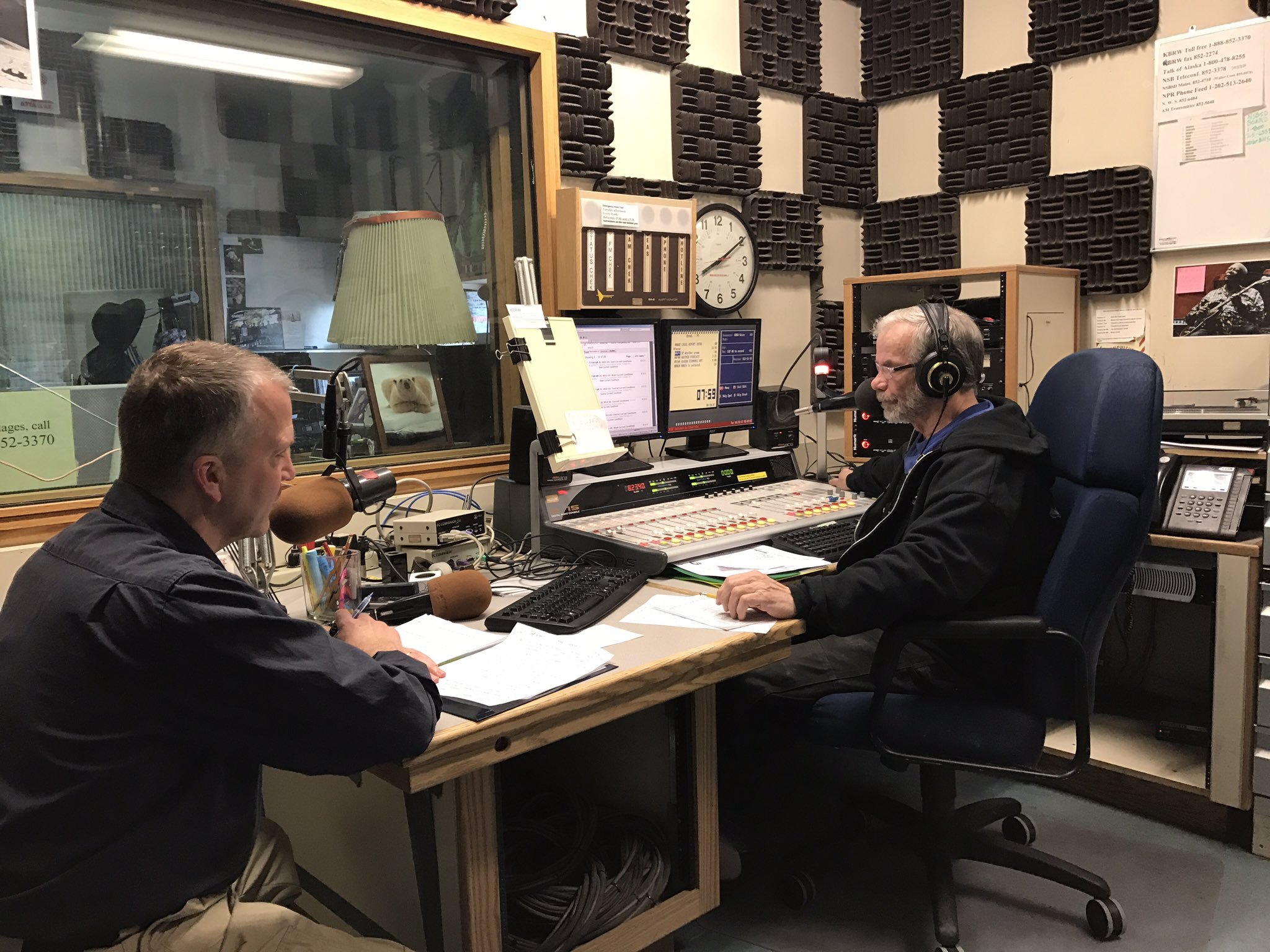
Senator Dan Sullivan in the studio at KBRW in 2017
