= KCSS (FM) =

Coordinates: 37.5263°N 120.8580°W

- Turlock, California; United States
- Broadcast area: Turlock, California
- Frequency: 91.9 (MHz)
- Branding: KCSS

Programming
- Format: Alternative rock

Ownership
- Owner: CSU Stanislaus

History
- First air date: 1975
- Call sign meaning: California State Stanislaus

Technical information
- Licensing authority: FCC
- Facility ID: 8368
- Class: A
- ERP: 6,000 watts
- HAAT: 32 meters

Links
- Public license information: Public file; LMS
- Webcast: Listen Live
- Website: www.kcss.net

KCSS (91.9 FM) is a student-run non-commercial educational radio station licensed to Turlock, California. The station, owned by California State University, Stanislaus, airs an Alternative music format.

== See also ==
- College radio
- List of college radio stations in the United States
