= KBGE (FM) =

- Cannon Beach, Oregon; United States
- Broadcast area: North Oregon Coast
- Frequency: 94.9 MHz
- Branding: 94.9 The Bridge

Programming
- Format: Adult Alternative

Ownership
- Owner: Boomer and Dawn Barbosa; (Captain Barbosa Media, LLC)

History
- First air date: 1997 (as KCBZ at 96.5)
- Former call signs: KCBZ (1995–2010); KQCB-FM (2010–2015)
- Former frequencies: 96.5 MHz (1997–2006)
- Call sign meaning: K BridGE

Technical information
- Licensing authority: FCC
- Facility ID: 8540
- Class: C3
- ERP: 7,000 watts horiz 1,200 watts vert
- HAAT: 92 meters (302 ft)
- Transmitter coordinates: 45°57′8″N 123°56′14″W
- Repeater: 94.9 KBGE-FM1 (Astoria)

Links
- Public license information: Public file; LMS
- Webcast: Listen Live
- Website: 949thebridge.com

KBGE (94.9 FM) is an American radio station licensed to Cannon Beach, Oregon, United States. The station is currently owned by Boomer and Dawn Barbosa, through licensee Captain Barbosa Media, LLC.

== History ==
On September 17, 2002, the station was sold to Entercom Portland License. On July 12, 2004, the station was sold to Alc Communications and on January 6, 2005, the station was sold to Calcomm Stations Oregon.

On November 5, 2010, KCBZ changed their call letters to KQCB-FM.

Calcom Stations Oregon sold KQCB-FM to Mark and Mickie Evans' SpinLogic Enterprises, Inc. for $170,000; the sale closed on January 15, 2015.

On February 2, 2015, KQCB-FM rebranded as "94.9 The Bridge" and changed their call letters to KBGE.

Effective May 7, 2019, SpinLogic Enterprises sold KBGE to Captain Barbosa Media, LLC for $140,000. Boomer Barbosa is best known as long time radio personality in Sacramento, CA

94-9 The Bridge (KBGE) consistently places as the #1 commercial radio station in the "Best of the North Coast" voting

== On Air Lineup ==
6am-Noon: Boomer Barbosa Noon-4pm: T-LUBS (Troll that Lives Under the Bridge Studios) 4pm-9pm: Colleen Holdar
