= Ark-La-Tex =

- Region
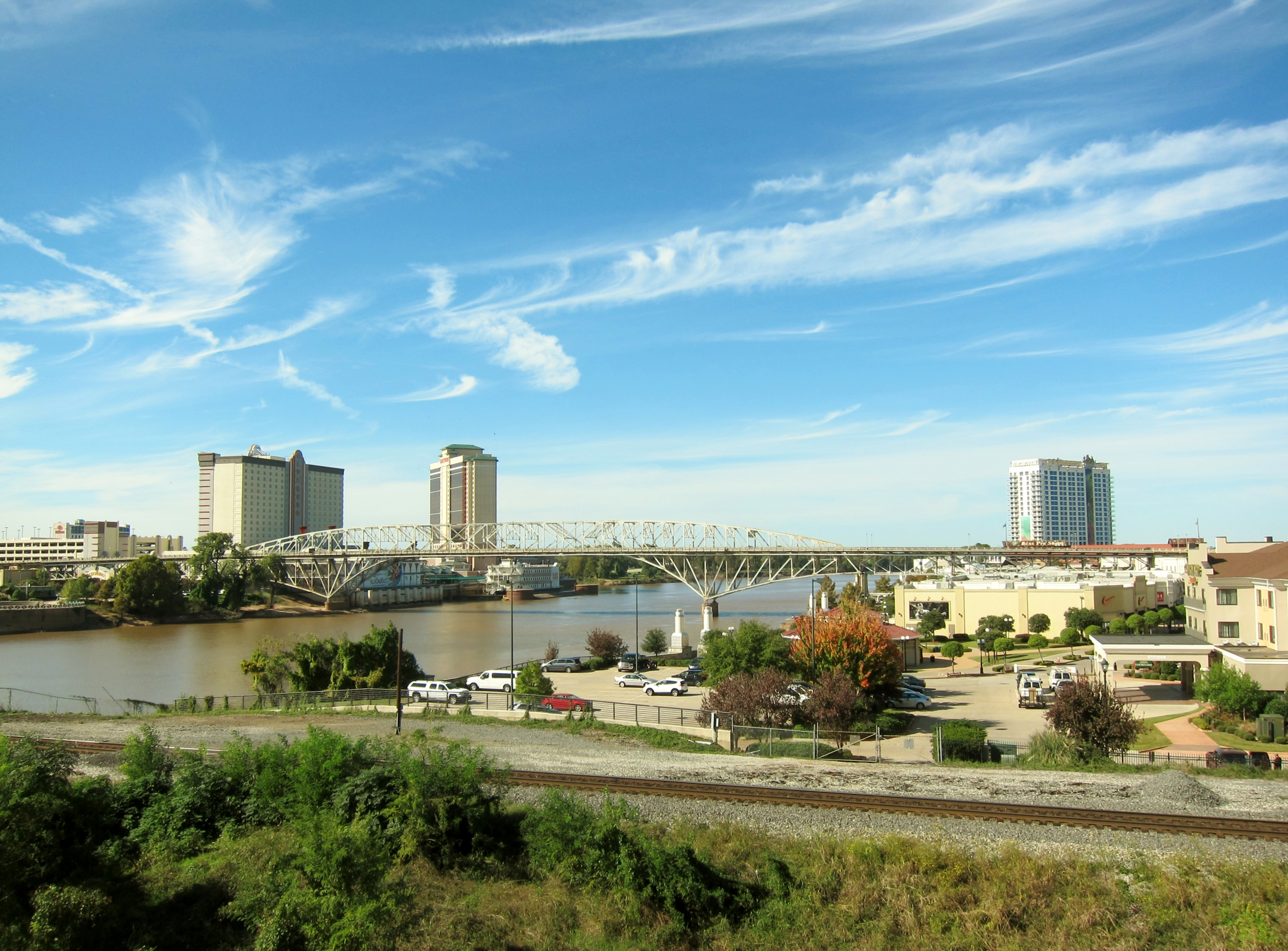
- Downtown Shreveport, Louisiana, in 2015

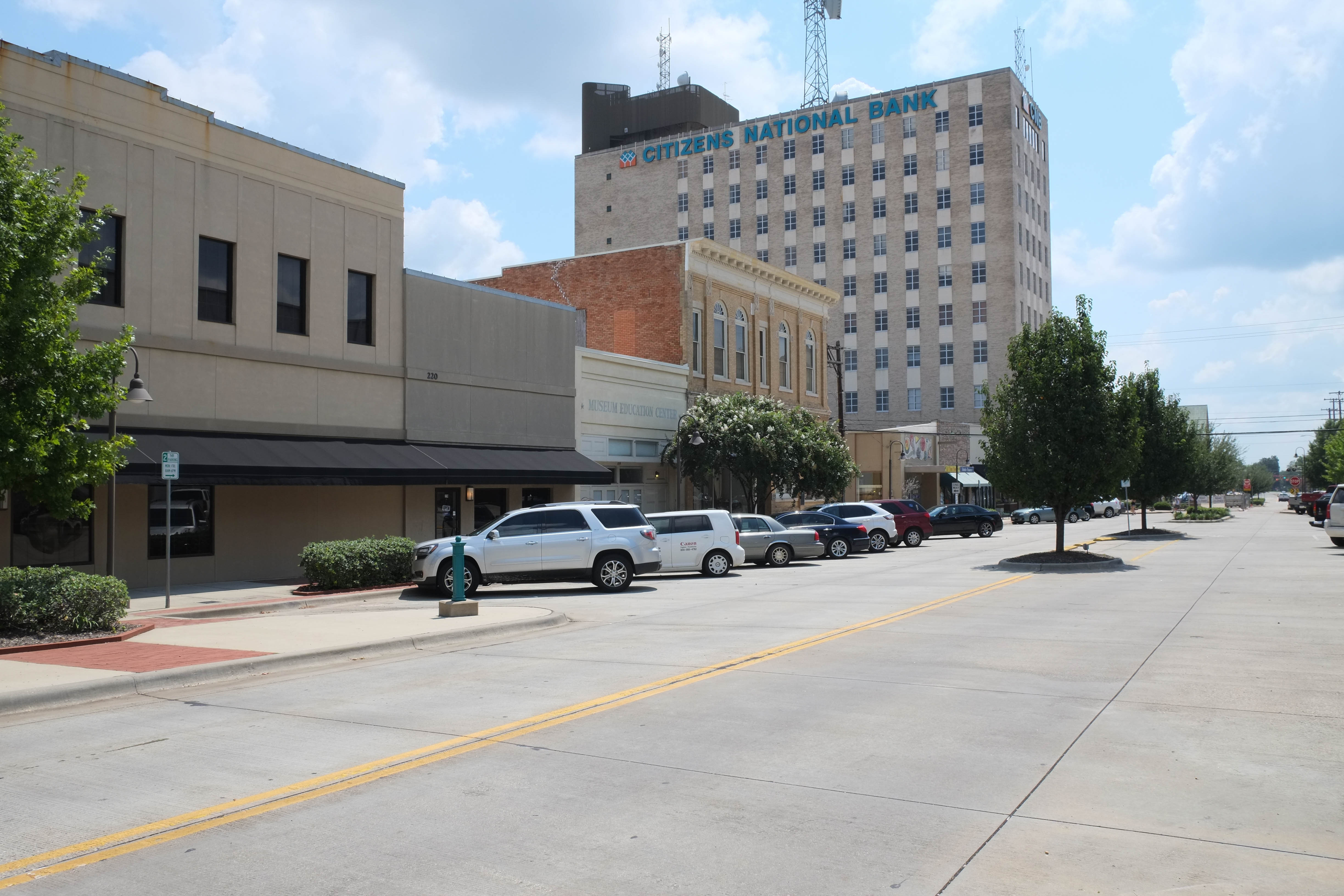
- Downtown Longview, Texas, in 2016

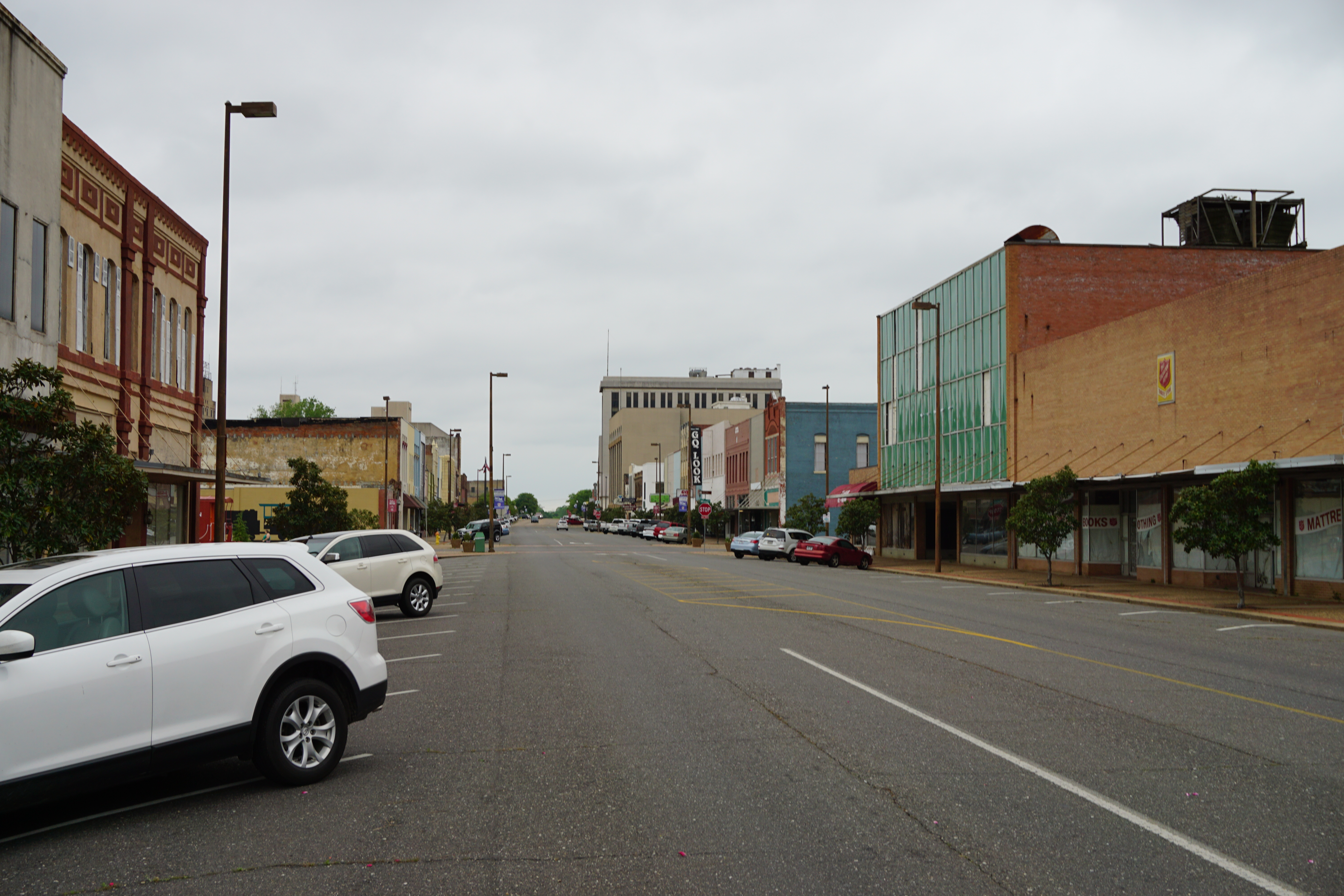
- Broad Street in Texarkana, Arkansas, in 2016
- Country: United States
- State: Arkansas; Louisiana; Oklahoma; Texas
- Principal cities: Shreveport; Bossier City; Longview; Texarkana; Nacogdoches; Marshall; Ruston; El Dorado; Natchitoches; Idabel

Population (2020)
  - Total: 1,469,860
- Time zone: UTC−6 (CST)
  - Summer (DST): UTC−5 (CDT)
- Area codes: 318, 430 and 903, 870, 580

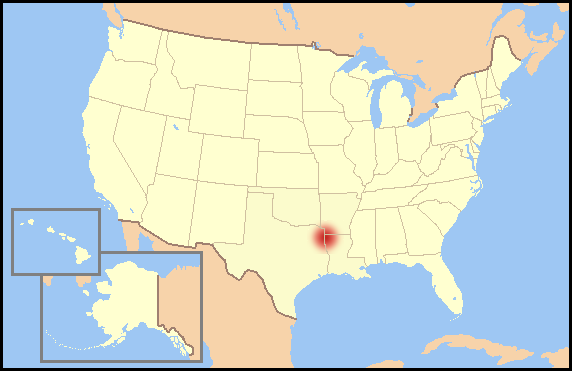
Map of the Ark-La-Tex region

The Ark-La-Tex (a portmanteau of the abbreviations for Arkansas, Louisiana, and Texas; also stylized as Arklatex or ArkLaTex) is a socioeconomic region where the Southern U.S. states of Arkansas, Oklahoma, Louisiana, and Texas join. The region contains portions of Northwest Louisiana, Northeast Texas, and South Arkansas, as well as Oklahoma's southeasternmost county, McCurtain County (part of Choctaw Country).

The population of the 40-county core region as of 2020 is 1,469,860 people, down from 1,515,056 in 2010. (Note: The population of the Ark-La-Tex is calculated by tallying the population of the counties within the socioeconomic tri-state region.) Shreveport, Louisiana, with 187,593 people in 2020, is the largest city, economic and geographic center of the region, and principal hub for both the Shreveport–Bossier City metropolitan area and Northwestern Louisiana. Longview, Texas, with a population of 81,683 people in 2020, is the second-largest city, as well as a principal city of the Tyler–Longview metropolitan conurbation and Greater Longview metropolitan area. The twin cities of Texarkana, Texas, and Texarkana, Arkansas, are the fourth- and sixth-largest cities, respectively, but collectively make up the region's third-largest metropolitan area (with a combined population exceeding 140,000 residents) as the center of the Texarkana metropolitan area encompassing Miller County, Arkansas, and Bowie County, Texas. Other cities in the Ark-La-Tex with 20,000 or more residents include Bossier City, Louisiana; Nacogdoches, Texas; Marshall, Texas; and Ruston, Louisiana.

The counties in the area's western section are largely part of the East Texas region (except for McCurtain County, Oklahoma, which is part of the Choctaw Country tourist region) and mainly encompass the Tyler–Longview–Lufkin–Nacogdoches television market area, while the counties and parishes in the eastern half of the region are included in the Shreveport–Texarkana television market. However, some Arkansas counties—under certain, looser definitions of the Ark-La-Tex region—in northwesternmost areas of the southwestern section of the state are included in the Little Rock viewing area.

== Etymology ==
Although use of the term to refer to the tri-state region dates back to the early 1900s, the name "Ark-La-Tex" was popularized regionally by a Shreveport Chamber of Commerce promotional campaign developed in 1932–33 to increase tourism in the area.

The campaign, dubbing the area as "The Land of Arklatex", was based on the idea that "the interests of all the people in the Tri-state area of South Arkansas, North Louisiana and East Texas are practically identical in matters pertaining to agriculture, industry, commerce and trade, and education." The region is alternatively, although seldom in most media and promotional parlance, referred to as "Arklatexoma" or "Ark-La-Texoma", which more inclusively encompasses McCurtain County and other parts of extreme Southeastern Oklahoma that lie along the Red River.

== Geography ==
The Ark-La-Tex covers over 14,000 square miles (36,000 km^{2}) across the four-state area; if the Ark-La-Tex were a U.S. state, it would be larger than Maryland. Most of the Ark-La-Tex is located in the Piney Woods, an ecoregion of dense forests of mixed deciduous and conifer flora. The forests are periodically punctuated by sloughs and bayous that are linked to larger bodies of water such as Caddo Lake or the Red River. Three of the four National Forests located within the Piney Woods of East Texas are wholly or partially within the Ark-La-Tex boundaries: Angelina National Forest (spanning Angelina, Nacogdoches, San Augustine and Jasper Counties), Sabine National Forest (near Hemphill) and Davy Crockett National Forest (between Lufkin and Crockett).

The Red River is the principal mainstem waterway in the region, exiting from the eastern end of Lake Texoma and running generally east along the Oklahoma–Texas border towards Southwestern Arkansas (entering it near the state line between Little River County, Arkansas, and Bowie County, Texas) before turning southward northeast of Texarkana (in so doing, forming the eastern border of Miller County) and passing into Northwestern Louisiana. The bordering Louisiana cities of Shreveport and Bossier City were developed along the river bank; its span within the Ark-La-Tex ends in Natchitoches Parish, Louisiana (where the Red River spans to the adjacent northwest of the parish's namesake county seat), at its intersection with Grant and Rapides Parishes.

=== Definition ===
As with all vernacular regions, the Ark-La-Tex has no official boundaries or status and is defined differently by various sources. Most definitions of the Ark-La-Tex delineate the region as encompassing 40 parishes and counties, and most weather radars suggest a 40-county or -parish area.

==== Louisiana (13 parishes) ====
- Bienville
- Bossier
- Caddo
- Claiborne
- DeSoto
- Jackson
- Lincoln
- Natchitoches
- Red River
- Sabine
- Union
- Webster
- Winn

==== Arkansas (10 counties) ====
- Columbia
- Hempstead
- Howard
- Lafayette
- Little River
- Miller
- Nevada
- Ouachita
- Sevier
- Union

==== Oklahoma (one county) ====
- McCurtain

==== Texas (16 counties) ====
- Bowie
- Camp
- Cass
- Gregg
- Harrison
- Marion
- Morris
- Nacogdoches
- Panola
- Red River
- Rusk
- Sabine
- San Augustine
- Shelby
- Titus
- Upshur

Alternate definitions can include eight additional Texas counties (Lamar, Delta, Hopkins, Franklin, Wood, Smith, Cherokee, and Angelina), include the Monroe, Louisiana metropolitan area and Ouachita Parish, Louisiana (which is considered part of the Ark-La-Miss region), exclude the counties encompassing the El Dorado, Arkansas micropolitan area, or exclude McCurtain County, Oklahoma. McCurtain County is usually included in the region's areal definition, primarily for media distribution purposes, even though the Oklahoma Department of Tourism and Recreation formally defines it as being part of its Choctaw Country tourism region. Another alternate definition is solely the vicinity of the Ark-La-Tex region's three principal cities, Shreveport, Longview, and Texarkana.

=== Climate ===
The Ark-La-Tex is situated in a humid subtropical climate (Köppen climate classification Cfa) typical of the Southeastern United States, albeit occasionally interrupted by intrusions of cold air during the winter months. Rainfall is abundant, with the normal annual precipitation averaging over 51 inches (1.3 m) in some areas (such as Shreveport), with monthly averages ranging from less than three inches (76 mm) in August to more than five inches (130 mm) in June. Portions of East Texas within the region receive more rainfall, 35 to 60 inches (890 to 1,520 mm), than the rest of the state. Due to the flat topography of some areas and the prominence of smaller waterways that are prone to backwater flooding from the Red River, communities occasionally experience severe flooding events. A notable occurrence of severe flooding occurred in March 2016, after torrential rains caused a rapid rise of many local waterways, displacing upwards of 3,500 people from their homes across Caddo and Bossier parishes and adjacent areas of Northwest Louisiana that lie along the Red River. Freezing rain and ice storms occasionally occur during the winter months.

Severe thunderstorms with heavy rain, hail, damaging winds and tornadoes occur in the area during the spring and summer months, although severe weather can also occur during the winter months. The region is in the western section of the "Dixie Alley" tornado climatology region, where tornadogenesis is most often attributed by high precipitation supercell thunderstorms—within which tornadoes are often partially or fully wrapped in curtains of heavy rain, impairing them from being seen by storm spotters and chasers, law enforcement, and the public—due to an increase of moisture from proximity to the nearby Gulf of Mexico. Some areas of the region, such as Bossier City, average a slightly above normal rate of tornadoes when compared to the national average. The winter months are normally mild; Shreveport, in particular, averages 35 days of freezing or below-freezing temperatures per year. Ice and sleet storms occasionally occur during this timeframe. The summer months are hot and humid, with high to very high relative average humidity, often as a result of moisture being advected from the Gulf of Mexico; in Shreveport, maximum temperatures exceed 90 °F (32 °C) an average of 91 days per year.

The National Weather Service operates a Weather Forecast Office in Shreveport, which provides local weather forecasts and warnings, watches and advisories for hazardous weather conditions for 39 counties and parishes within the greater Ark-La-Tex region.

== Communities ==
=== Largest cities ===
List of cities with over 3,500 people (in 2020):

==== Louisiana ====
City	Parish	Population
Blanchard	Caddo	3,538
Bossier City	Bossier	62,701
Eastwood	Bossier	4,390
Grambling	Lincoln	5,239
Haughton	Bossier	4,539
Jonesboro	Jackson	4,106
Mansfield	DeSoto	4,714
Minden	Webster	11,928
Natchitoches	Natchitoches	18,039
Red Chute	Bossier	7,065
Ruston	Lincoln	22,166
Shreveport	Caddo, Bossier	187,593
Springhill	Webster	4,801
Winnfield	Winn	4,153

==== Texas ====
City	County	Population
Atlanta	Cass	5,433
Carthage	Panola	6,569
Center	Shelby	5,221
Gilmer	Upshur	4,843
Gladewater	Gregg, Upshur	6,134
Hallsville	Harrison	4,277
Henderson	Rusk	13,271
Kilgore	Gregg, Rusk	13,376
Longview	Gregg, Harrison	105,184
Marshall	Harrison	55,446
Mount Pleasant	Titus	16,047
Nacogdoches	Nacogdoches	32,147
Nash	Bowie	3,814
New Boston	Bowie	4,612
Pittsburg	Camp	4,335
Texarkana	Bowie	60,113
Wake Village	Bowie	5,945
White Oak	Gregg	6,225

==== Arkansas ====
City	County	Population
Ashdown	Little River	4,261
Camden	Ouachita	10,612
De Queen	Sevier	6,105
El Dorado	Union	17,755
Hope	Hempstead	8,952
Magnolia	Columbia	11,162
Nashville	Howard	4,153
Texarkana	Miller	29,387

==== Oklahoma ====
City	County	Population
Broken Bow	McCurtain	4,228
Idabel	McCurtain	6,961

=== Metropolitan and micropolitan areas ===
==== Metropolitan statistical areas ====
MSA	Primary city/cities	State(s)	Counties or parishes	Total area	Population (2023)
Shreveport–Bossier City metropolitan area	Shreveport; Bossier City; Mansfield	Louisiana	Bossier; Caddo; DeSoto	2,699 sq mi (6,990 km^{2})	383,295
Greater Longview metropolitan area	Longview	Texas	Gregg; Harrison; Rusk; Upshur	1,807 sq mi (4,680 km^{2})	705,231
Greater Texarkana metropolitan area	Texarkana, AR; Texarkana, TX	Texas; Arkansas	Bowie, TX; Little River, AR; Miller, AR	2,125 sq mi (5,500 km^{2})	145,907

==== Micropolitan statistical areas ====
μSA	Primary city/cities	State(s)	Counties or parishes	Total area	Population (2023)
Nacogdoches, TX Micropolitan Statistical Area	Nacogdoches	Texas	Nacogdoches	981 sq mi (2,540 km^{2})	65,375
Mount Pleasant, TX Micropolitan Statistical Area	Mount Pleasant	Texas	Camp; Morris; Titus	888 sq mi (2,300 km^{2})	56,423
Ruston, LA Micropolitan Statistical Area	Ruston; Grambling	Louisiana	Lincoln	472 sq mi (1,220 km^{2})	47,962
El Dorado, AR Micropolitan Statistical Area	El Dorado	Arkansas	Union	1,055 sq mi (2,730 km^{2})	37,397
Natchitoches, LA Micropolitan Statistical Area	Natchitoches	Louisiana	Natchitoches	1,299 sq mi (3,360 km^{2})	36,291
Minden, LA Micropolitan Statistical Area	Minden	Louisiana	Webster	615 sq mi (1,590 km^{2})	35,238
Camden, AR Micropolitan Statistical Area	Camden	Arkansas	Calhoun; Ouachita	1,372 sq mi (3,550 km^{2})	26,434
Magnolia, AR Micropolitan Statistical Area	Magnolia	Arkansas	Columbia	767 sq mi (1,990 km^{2})	22,150

== Culture ==
The culture of the Ark-La-Tex region, and especially its music, shows a mixture of influences from the related, but distinct, cultures of its surrounding states. The music of the area is marked by country and blues sounds typical of the music of the Southern United States, the Western music of Texas, and the well-documented music of New Orleans and Acadiana in Louisiana. The area had a significant role in the development of country and rock-and-roll music, beginning in the 1940s. On March 1, 1948, Shreveport radio station KWKH launched a country music variety show called the Ark-La-Tex Jubilee, followed a month later by the long-running and influential Louisiana Hayride program. Hayride director Horace Logan and regular performer Webb Pierce started a music publishing company called Ark-La-Tex Music. Drummer Brian Blade, a Shreveport native, included a song entitled "Ark.La.Tex." on his 2014 album Landmarks, exploring the mixture of musical influences in his home region.

== Education ==
=== Colleges and universities ===
The region contains Stephen F. Austin State University in Nacogdoches, part of the University of Texas System, and Louisiana Tech University, a public research university in Ruston, which are the largest public institutions of higher education in the Ark-La-Tex. Named after Stephen F. Austin, who led the second and most successful colonization of the region that would become the state of Texas through the migration of 300 families from other parts of the United States in 1825, the former of the two major universities was founded as a teachers' college in 1923 as a result of legislation authored by State Senator Wilfred Roy Cousins, Sr. Louisiana Tech opened in 1894 (as the Industrial Institute and College of Louisiana) to provide educational subjects pertaining to the arts and sciences for the development of an industrial economy in Louisiana post-Reconstruction. In the 1960s the school (then named Louisiana Polytechnic Institute) became desegregated, and allowed integrated classes with white and black students; after it achieved criteria of a research university under the leadership of President F. Jay Taylor, the university officially adopted its current name in 1970. Louisiana Tech also operates a satellite campus in Shreveport as well as classes at the Academic Success Center and Barksdale Air Force Base Instructional Site in Bossier City, and at the CenturyLink corporate headquarters in Monroe. Ruston is also home to a branch campus of Monroe-based Louisiana Delta Community College.

The Shreveport–Bossier City area is home to several colleges; among them, the Methodist-affiliated Centenary College of Louisiana (originally founded in the East Feliciana Parish town of Jackson in 1825, eventually relocating to Shreveport in 1908), Louisiana Baptist University and Theological Seminary (founded in 1973), Louisiana State University Health Sciences Center Shreveport (opened in 1969 as the only medical school in northern Louisiana) and one of the largest nursing schools in northern Louisiana, the Northwestern State University College of Nursing (opened in 1949) as well as satellite campuses of Louisiana State University (opened as a two-year institution in 1967, and expanded into a four-year college in 1972), Southern University (opened in 1967 with a two-year associate's degree program). Longview, Texas, is home to LeTourneau University, a private, four-year Christian university founded by R.G. LeTourneau in 1946, originally as LeTourneau Technical Institute. Inclusively, Tyler, Texas is also home to satellite higher education campuses through the University of Texas System by way of the University of Texas at Tyler (opened in 1971 as Tyler State College) and the University of Texas Health Center at Tyler (opened in 1947 as the East Texas Tuberculosis Sanitarium and chartered into The University of Texas System in 1977 by the system's Board of Regents) as well as one of two independent institutions, Tyler Junior College (opened in 1926).

The Texarkana metropolitan area is home to Texas A&M University–Texarkana, a four-year satellite branch of the Texas A&M University System (founded as an upper-level extension college of East Texas State University in 1971), and Texarkana College (a public community college formed in 1927 as a branch of the Texarkana Independent School District and separated into an independent institution via a public vote in 1941). Arkadelphia is home to two liberal arts institutions: Henderson State University (founded in 1890 as Arkadelphia Methodist College), which is the only member of the Council of Public Liberal Arts Colleges based in Arkansas and announced plans to join the Arkansas State University System in October 2019, and Ouachita Baptist University, a private, Baptist college affiliated with the Arkansas Baptist State Convention (opened in 1886).

The area also houses several historically black colleges and universities (HBCU). The largest of these, Grambling State University, located in the namesake Lincoln Parish town of Grambling (four miles [6.4 km] west of the Louisiana Tech University campus), was founded in 1901 as the Colored Industrial and Agricultural School. The university was created out of the desire of African-American farmers in rural areas of northern Louisiana to educate other black residents in that section of the state; it moved to its present location in 1905 (as the North Louisiana Agricultural and Industrial School) and became a state junior college (renamed the Louisiana Negro Normal and Industrial Institute) by 1928, when it began offering two-year professional certificates and diplomas to graduates. Grambling received accreditation by the Southern Association of Colleges and Schools (SACS) in 1949. Other HBCUs in the region include Texas College in Tyler (opened in 1894), Jarvis Christian University in Hawkins (a Christian-based HBCU founded in 1912), and Wiley College in Marshall (a private liberal arts college founded in 1873 by Methodist Episcopal Church Bishop Isaac Wiley and certified in 1882 by the Freedman's Aid Society, which is one of the oldest predominantly black colleges west of the Mississippi River).

== Media ==
=== Newspapers ===
- Athens Daily Review – Athens (Daily, except Sundays and Mondays)
- Bossier Press-Tribune – Bossier City (Bi-weekly)
- Coushatta Citizen - Coushatta (Daily/Morning)
- The Daily Sentinel – Nacogdoches (Daily/Morning)
- Longview News-Journal – Longview (Daily)
- Lufkin Daily News – Lufkin (Daily)
- Marshall News Messenger – Marshall (Daily/Morning)
- McCurtain County Gazette – Idabel (Daily/Morning)
- Natchitoches Times – Natchitoches (Daily/Morning)
- Ruston Daily Leader – Ruston (Daily, except Saturdays)
- Texarkana Gazette – Texarkana, AR (Daily/Morning)
- The Times – Shreveport (Daily/Morning)
- Tyler Morning Telegraph – Tyler (Daily/Morning)

=== TV ===
==== Shreveport/Texarkana (Northwest Louisiana and Southwest Arkansas) ====
- KTAL-TV (channel 6) – Texarkana/Shreveport/Marshall (NBC affiliate)
- KMSS-TV (channel 33) – Shreveport/Texarkana (Fox affiliate)
- KSHV-TV (channel 45) – Shreveport/Texarkana (MyNetworkTV affiliate)
- KPXJ (channel 21) – Minden/Shreveport/Texarkana (CW affiliate)
- KSLA (channel 12) – Shreveport/Texarkana/Bossier City/Marshall/Natchitoches (CBS affiliate)
- KTBS-TV (channel 3) – Shreveport/Texarkana (ABC affiliate)
- KLTS (channel 24) – Shreveport (PBS member station; Louisiana Public Broadcasting satellite)
- KETG (channel 9) – Arkadelphia (PBS member station; Arkansas PBS satellite)

==== El Dorado/Monroe (South Central Arkansas and North Central Louisiana) ====
- KNOE-TV (channel 8) – El Dorado/Monroe/Ruston (CBS & ABC affiliate)
- KTVE (channel 10) – El Dorado/Monroe/Ruston (NBC affiliate)

==== Tyler/Lufkin (East Texas) ====
- KLTV (channel 7) – Tyler/Longview (ABC affiliate)
- KYTX (channel 19) – Nacogdoches/Lufkin/Tyler/Longview/Jacksonville (CBS affiliate)
- KFXK (channel 51) – Longview/Tyler (Fox affiliate)
- KCEB (channel 54) – Longview/Tyler (beIN Sports Xtra Español affiliate)
- KETK-TV (channel 56) – Jacksonville/Tyler/Longview (NBC affiliate)
- KTRE (channel 9) – Lufkin/Nacogdoches (ABC affiliate; semi-satellite of KLTV)

=== Radio ===
==== AM stations ====
===== Arkansas =====
- KVRC (1240; "Fox Sports Arkansas") – Arkadelphia (Sports/Fox Sports Radio)
- KDMS (1290) – El Dorado (Gospel)
- KELD (1400; "The Fan") – El Dorado (Sports/Fox Sports Radio)

===== Louisiana =====
- KEEL (710) / K2689GO (101.7 FM, repeater; "KEEL 101.7 FM & 710 AM") – Shreveport/Bossier City/Texarkana/Marshall/Natchitoches (News/talk)
- KRRP (950; "Praise 950") – Coushatta/Natchitoches (Urban contemporary gospel)
- KOKA (980) / K227CY (93.3, repeater; "KOKA 980 AM, 93.3 FM") – Shreveport/Bossier City/Marshall (Urban contemporary gospel)
- KBCL (1070; "Praise 1070") – Bossier City/Shreveport (Christian talk)
- KWKH (1130; "1130 The Tiger") – Shreveport/Bossier City (Sports radio/Fox Sports Radio)
- KASO (1240) – Minden/Shreveport/Bossier City (Classic hits)
- KSYB (1300; "1300 AM KSYB") – Shreveport/Bossier City (Gospel)
- KNCB (1320) / K281CY (104.1; "ESPN Shreveport") – Vivian/Shreveport/Bossier City (Sports)
- KRMD (1340; "The Ticket") – Shreveport/Bossier City / K264AS (100.7 FM, repeater) – Mooringsport (Sports talk)
- KNOC (1450) / K240EY (95.9, repeater; "95.9 The Bounce") – Natchitoches/Fairview Alpha (Gold-based rhythmic hot adult contemporary), licensed canceled on January 26, 2026
- KTKC (1460 AM; "Red de Radio Amistad") – Springhill (Spanish Christian)
- KIOU (1480) – Shreveport/Bossier City (Christian radio)
- KRUS (1490) / K242DA (96.3, repeater; "Hitz 96.3") – Ruston/Grambling (Urban contemporary)

===== Texas =====
- KTBB (600) – Tyler/Longview / KTBB-FM (97.5) – Troup (News/talk)
- KCMC (740) / K300DW (107.9 FM, repeater; "107.9 The Fan") – Texarkana, TX (Sports/CBS Sports Radio)
- KSFA (860; "News Talk 860") – Lufkin/Nacodgdoches (News/talk)
- KTFS (940) / K290CP (105.9 FM, repeater) – Texarkana, TX (Gospel)
- KSST (1230 AM) – Sulphur Springs (Oldies)
- KDOK (1240; "All Hit Radio K-DOK") – Kilgore/Longview/Marshall (Classic Hits)
- KZHN (1250; "1250 The Texan") – Paris (Classic country)
- KSML (1260; "NBC Sports Radio 1260") – Lufkin/Nacodgdoches (Sports/NBC Sports Radio)
- KIVY (1290) – Crockett/Lufkin/Nacodgdoches (Adult standards)
- KGLD (1330 AM; "The Light") – Tyler/Longview (Gospel)
- KRBA (1340 AM) – Lufkin/Nacodgdoches (News/talk/variety)
- KHDY (1350; "K-Car") – Clarksville (Classic Country)
- KFRO (1370) – Longview/Marshall (Talk)
- KKTK (1400) / K246CR (97.1 FM, repeater; "Fox Sports 1400 AM") – Texarkana, TX (Sports/Fox Sports Radio)
- KEES (1430) – Gladewater/Longview/Marshall (Black gospel)
- KMHT (1450; "ESPN Radio 1450") – Marshall/Longview (Sports/ESPN Radio)
- KWRD (1470) / K253CE (98.5; "1470 AM / 98.5 FM KWRD") – Henderson/Longview/Marshall (Country)
- KPLT (1490; "Classic Country KPLT") – Paris (Classic country)
- KYZS (1490) / K239CB (95.7, repeater; "ESPN East Texas 95.7") – Tyler (Sports/ESPN Radio)

===== Oklahoma =====
- KBEL (1240; "Talk 1240") – Idabel (News/talk)

==== FM stations ====
===== Arkansas =====
- KBSA (90.9; "Red River Radio") – El Dorado (NPR/Public Radio International)
- KAGL (93.3; "The Eagle") – El Dorado (Classic rock)
- KMJI (93.3; "Majic 93-3") – Ashdown/Texarkana, AR (Urban Contemporary)
- KMRX (96.1; "Big 96.1") – El Dorado (Classic hits)
- KMLK (98.7; "The Heart and Soul 98.7") – El Dorado (Urban Adult Contemporary)
- KDEL-FM (100.9; "Fox Sports Arkansas") – Arkadelphia (Sports/Fox Sports Radio)
- KIXB (103.3; "KIX 103") – El Dorado (Country)
- KPGG (103.9) – Ashdown/Texarkana, AR / KHDY-FM (98.5 FM; "98.5 & 103.9 The Pig") – Clarksville (Classic country)
- KTOY (104.7; "Jammin 104.7") – Texarkana, AR (Urban Adult Contemporary)
- KYGL (106.3; "Eagle 106.3") – Texarkana, AR (Classic rock)
- KTFS-FM (107.1; "News Talk 107.1 KTFS") – Texarkana, AR (News/talk)

===== Louisiana =====
- KVSE (89.1; "Miracle 89.1") – Blanchard/Shreveport/Bossier City (Contemporary Christian)
- KLPI (89.1) – Ruston (College-leading Alternative rock)
- KBIO (89.7; "Radio Maria") – Natchitoches (Christian radio)
- KDAQ (89.9; "Red River Radio") – Shreveport (NPR/Public Radio International)
- KNWD (91.7; "The Demon") – Natchitoches (College-leading Alternative rock)
- KVCL-FM (92.1) - Winnfield (Country)
- KJVC (92.7) – Mansfield (Classic Country)
- KXKS-FM (93.7; "Kiss Country") – Shreveport/Bossier City/Minden/Marshall (Country)
- KRUF (94.5; "K94.5") – Shreveport/Bossier City/Marshall/Minden (Top 40 CHR)
- KSBH-HD1 (94.9; "94.9 The River") – Coushatta/Natchitoches/Fairview Alpha (Country), licensed canceled on January 26, 2026
  - Relays HD2 / K222AO (92.3 FM, repeater; "92.3 The Fox") (Classic hits), licensed canceled on January 26, 2026
- KLKL (95.7; "The River 95.7") – Minden/Shreveport/Bossier City/Marshall (Classic hits)
- KVKI-FM (96.5) – Shreveport/Bossier City/Marshall/Minden (Adult contemporary)
- KQHN (97.3; "Q 97.3") – Waskom/Shreveport/Bossier City/Marshall/Minden (Hot Adult Contemporary)
- KDBH-FM (97.5; "Country Legends 97.5") – Natchitoches/Fairview Alpha/Coushatta (Classic Country)
- KTAL-FM (98.1; "98 Rocks") – Texarkana/Shreveport/Bossier City (Classic Rock)
- KPCH (99.3; "The Peach 99.3") – Ruston/Grambling (Classic hits)
- KMJJ-FM (99.7) – Shreveport/Bossier City/Marshall/Minden (Urban Contemporary)
- KZBL (100.7) – Natchitoches/Fairview Alpha (Oldies)
- KBNF-LP (101.3) – Ruston/Grambling (High school-leading '80s Classic hits)
- KDKS-FM (102.1; "KDKS Hot 102 Jams") – Blanchard/Shreveport/Bossier City (Urban adult contemporary)
- KVMA-FM (102.9; "Magic 102.9") – Shreveport/Bossier City/Marshall/Minden (Soul/R&B Oldies-leaning Urban Adult Contemporary)
- KBTT (103.7; "Tha Beat") - Haughton/Shreveport/Bossier City (Mainstream Urban)
- KNCB-FM (105.3; "Hot Country 105.3") – Vivian (Country)
- KWLV (107.1) - Many/Natchitoches/Mansfield (Country)
- KXKZ (107.5; "Z107.5") – Ruston/Grambling/Natchitoches/Winnfield (Country)

===== Texas =====
- KLDN (88.9; "Red River Radio") – Lufkin/Nacodgdoches (NPR/Public Radio International)
- KVNE (89.5) / KGLY (91.3; "Encouragement FM") – Tyler/Longview (Contemporary Christian)
- KAXM (90.1; "Your East Texas Alternative") – Nacodgdoches/Lufkin (College radio)
- KSWP (90.9) – Lufkin/Nacodgdoches (Contemporary Christian)
- KBWC (91.1) – Marshall/Longview (College-leading Urban contemporary)
- KTXK (91.5) – Texarkana, TX (NPR)
- KAVX (91.9) – Lufkin/Nacodgdoches (Christian talk)
- KRWR (92.1; "92.1 The Team FM") – Tyler/Longview (Sports/Fox Sports Radio)
- KDPM (92.3) – Marshall/Longview (silent)
- KXXE (92.5) – San Augustine/Lufkin/Nacodgdoches (Country)
- KTYL-FM (93.1; "Mix 93.1") – Tyler/Longview (Hot Adult Contemporary)
- KOYN (93.9) – Paris (Country)
- KTRG (94.1; "ESPN Texarkana") – Hooks/Texarkana, TX (Sports)
- KVLL (94.7; "My 94.7") – Wells/Lufkin/Nacodgdoches (Adult contemporary)
- KEWL (95.1; "The Rewind on 95.1") – New Boston/Texarkana, TX (Classic hits)
- KAFX-FM (95.5; "KFOX 95.5") – Diboll/Lufkin (Top 40 CHR)
- KITX (95.5; "K 95.5") – Paris (Country)
- KPWW (95.9; "Power 95-9") – Hooks/Texarkana, TX (Top 40 CHR)
- KSCH (95.9 FM) – Sulphur Springs / KSCN (96.9 FM, repeater) – Pittsburg (Country)
- KKTX-FM (96.1; "Classic Rock 96.1") – Kilgore/Tyler/Longview/Marshall (Classic rock)
- KOYE (96.7; "La Invasora 96.7") – Frankston/Lufkin/Nacodgdoches (Regional Mexican)
- KLVH (97.1; "K-Love") – Cleveland/Lufkin/Nacodgdoches (Contemporary Christian)
- KGFZ (97.7; "Z-97.7") – Burke/Lufkin/Nacodgdoches (Urban contemporary)
- KALK (97.7 FM; "K-Lake 97.7") – Winfield/Paris (Classic hits)
- KLOW (98.9 FM; "Trumpet Radio 98.9") – Reno/Paris (Contemporary Christian)
- KTUX (98.9; "Highway 98.9") – Carthage/Shreveport/Bossier City/Marshall (Classic Rock)
- KAPW (99.3; "Mega 99.3") – White Oak/Longview/Marshall (Regional Mexican)
- KNRB (100.1) – Atlanta (Contemporary Christian)
- KRMD-FM (101.1) – Oil City/Shreveport/Bossier City (Country)
- KYBI (100.1; "Y100") – Lufkin/Nacodgdoches (Country)
- KTYK (100.7; "Red River Radio") – Overton/Tyler/Longview (NPR/Public Radio International)
- KNUE (101.5) – Tyler (Spanish Christian)
- KBYB (101.7) – Hope / K257FY (99.3, repeater; "101.7 Hot FM") – Texarkana, TX (Country)
- KBUS (101.9; "101.9 The Bus") – Paris (Classic rock)
- KSML-FM (101.9; "Super Mix 101.9") – Huntington/Lufkin (Regional Mexican)
- KLFZ (102.3; "Fun Radio") – Jacksonville/Tyler/Longview (Top 40)
- KKYR-FM (102.5; "Kicker 102.5") – Texarkana, TX (Country)
- KBLZ (102.7; "The Blaze") – Winona/Tyler (Urban Contemporary)
- KJCS (103.3; "103 The Bull") – Nacodgdoches/Lufkin (Classic country)
- KZRB (103.5) – New Boston/Texarkana, TX (Urban Contemporary)
- KMHT-FM (103.9; "103.9 Classic Country") – Marshall/Longview (Classic country)
- KKUS (104.1; "The Ranch") – Tyler/Longview (Classic country)
- KFYN-FM (104.3; "The River") – Detroit (Traditional/Red Dirt Country)
- KYKS (105.1; "Kicks 105") – Lufkin/Nacodgdoches (Country)
- KYKX (105.7) – Longview/Tyler (Country)
- KOOI (106.5; "Jack 106.5") – Jacksonville/Tyler/Longview (Variety hits)
- KISX (107.3; "Hot1073Jamz") – Whitehouse/Tyler (Urban Adult Contemporary)
- KPLT-FM (107.7 FM; "Mix 107.7") – Paris (Mainstream Top 40)
- KTBQ (107.7; "Q107") – Nacodgdoches/Lufkin (Classic rock)

===== Oklahoma =====
- KBWW (88.3; "The Gospel Station") – Broken Bow (Southern Gospel)
- KYHD (94.7; "HD 94.7") – Valliant (News/talk)
- KBEL-FM (96.7) – Idabel (Country)
- KQIB (102.9; "Q102.9") – Idabel (Hot Adult Contemporary)
- KIBE (104.9; "Mountaineer Radio") – Broken Bow (Variety)
- KKBI (106.1; "Best Country 106") – Broken Bow (Country music)

== Transportation ==
=== Airports ===
Shreveport Regional Airport (IATA: SHV; ICAO: KSHV), located off Hollywood Avenue in southwestern Shreveport, is the region's primary commercial airport. Established in 1952, Shreveport Regional is served by Allegiant Air (with flights to McCarran International Airport in Las Vegas and Orlando Sanford International Airport), American Airlines (to Dallas/Fort Worth International Airport), Delta Air Lines (to Hartsfield–Jackson Atlanta International Airport), GLO Airlines (to Louis Armstrong New Orleans International Airport), and United Airlines (as United Express, to George Bush Intercontinental Airport in Houston and Denver International Airport). Shreveport Downtown Airport (IATA: DTN; ICAO: KDTN), built in 1931 and located north of downtown Shreveport along the Red River, is the city's general aviation airport and also serves as a reliever airport for Shreveport Regional Airport, itself built to replace the Downtown Airport as Shreveport's main commercial airport due to the limited growth that could be made to that facility due to its close proximity of the Red River.

General and limited commercial aviation is additionally available at several smaller airfields in the Ark-La-Tex; Tyler Pounds Regional Airport (IATA: TYR; ICAO: KTYR), a city-owned public use airport in Tyler; offers service to and from Dallas/Fort Worth International and, on a seasonal basis, Denver International, respectively, via American Eagle and Frontier Airlines. East Texas Regional Airport (IATA: GGG; ICAO: KGGG), located nine miles (14 km) south of Longview, is used for general aviation and military training but also provides connector service to Dallas/Fort Worth International Airport via American Airlines and American Eagle. Texarkana Regional Airport (IATA: TXK; ICAO: KTXK), a city-owned public use facility located 3.4 miles (5.5 km) northeast of Texarkana, Arkansas's central business district, mainly provides general aviation travel but is also served by American Eagle. Exclusively general aviation service is provided by Angelina County Airport (IATA: LFK; ICAO: KLFK), located 8.05 miles (12.96 km) southwest of downtown Lufkin; A.L. Mangham Jr. Regional Airport (IATA: OCH; ICAO: KOCH), located one mile (1.6 km) outside Loop 224 northwest of TX State Highway 7; and Natchitoches Regional Airport (ICAO: KIER), located 2.3 miles (3.7 km) south of downtown Natchitoches.

=== Major highways ===
The Ark-La-Tex is an integral point on the United States Interstate Network, with three major interstate highways—Interstate 20, Interstate 30, and Interstate 49—servicing the region, connecting five of the region's largest cities, Tyler, Longview, Marshall, Shreveport and Bossier City. Interstates 20 and 49—the latter of which has its northern terminus at the intersection of the former of the two Interstates—bisect Shreveport, intersecting with I-220 and LA Highway 3132 (which both serve as bypass routes connecting the northern and southern parts of Shreveport) on the city's west side, with U.S. 171 in downtown Shreveport, and with I-220 in central Bossier Parish (north of Barksdale Air Force Base, at which point it begins sharing an overlap with U.S. 71 as it traverses eastward towards Monroe).

The region is a point within the planned extension of the otherwise presently disjointed Interstate 69. A branch of the Interstate (I-369) presently runs north on U.S. 59 within Texas from Tenaha to Texarkana, where the span will eventually connect to Interstates 30 and 49. In response to widespread opposition from environmental groups and property rights activists, the Texas Department of Transportation (TxDOT) announced in June 2008 that it would complete I-69 through upgrades to the existing spans of U.S. 59, U.S. 77 and U.S. 281 to Interstate standards through rural areas, with bypasses around urban centers along the route, which will be financed through private sector investment. An approximately 350-mile (560 km) portion of the I-69 extension to extend from south of Clarksdale, Mississippi, to the Louisiana/Texas state line will be built as a new-terrain route that parallels existing U.S. and state highways in some areas. One of the current segments, SIU 16, covers areas of East Texas to the northeast of Nacogdoches, extending until it terminates at U.S. 171 near Stonewall. Another segment, SIU 15, continues over the southern and eastern sections of Shreveport, crossing I-49 and ending at I-20 near Haughton. The third existing segment, SIU 14, extends northeast from I-20 to US 82 near El Dorado, Arkansas.

==== Interstates ====
- Interstate 20
- Interstate 30
- Interstate 49
- Interstate 69 (Future)
- Interstate 220 (Louisiana)
- Interstate 369 (Texas)

==== U.S. Routes ====
- U.S. Route 59
- U.S. Route 63
- U.S. Route 67
- U.S. Route 69
- U.S. Route 70
- U.S. Route 71
- U.S. Route 79
  - U.S. Route 79 Business
- U.S. Route 80
- U.S. Route 82
  - U.S. Route 82 Business
- U.S. Route 84
- U.S. Route 167
- U.S. Route 171
- U.S. Route 175
- U.S. Route 259
- U.S. Route 270
- U.S. Route 271
  - U.S. Route 271 Business
- U.S. Route 278
- U.S. Route 287
- U.S. Route 371

==== Texas highways ====
===== State highways =====
- TX State Highway 7
- TX State Highway 8
- TX State Highway 11
- TX State Highway 19
- TX State Highway 21
- TX State Highway 24
- TX State Highway 31
- TX State Highway 37
- TX State Highway 42
- TX State Highway 43
- TX State Highway 49
- TX State Highway 57
- TX State Highway 63
- TX State Highway 64
- TX State Highway 77
- TX State Highway 93
- TX State Highway 94
- TX State Highway 98
- TX State Highway 103
- TX State Highway 110
- TX State Highway 135
- TX State Highway 147
- TX State Highway 149
- TX State Highway 154
- TX State Highway 155
- TX State Highway 182
- TX State Highway 204
- TX State Highway 294
- TX State Highway 300
- TX State Highway 315
- TX State Highway 322
- TX State Highway 323
- TX State Highway 338

===== State highway loops =====
- Loop 49
- TX Loop 151
- TX Loop 224
- TX Loop 281
- TX Loop 286
- TX Loop 301
- TX Loop 304
- TX Loop 323
- TX Loop 390
- TX Loop 485

==== Louisiana state highways ====
- LA Highway 1
- LA Highway 2
- LA Highway 3
- LA Highway 4
- LA Highway 5
- LA Highway 6
- LA Highway 9
- LA Highway 33
- LA Highway 34
- LA Highway 72
- LA Highway 118
- LA Highway 126
- LA Highway 127
- LA Highway 156
- LA Highway 173
- LA Highway 174
- LA Highway 471
- LA Highway 480
- LA Highway 499
- LA Highway 500
- LA Highway 501
- LA Highway 505
- LA Highway 526
- LA Highway 1228
- LA Highway 3014
- LA Highway 3049
- LA Highway 3132
- LA Highway 3136
- LA Highway 3194
- LA Highway 3249
- LA Highway 3276
- LA Highway 3278
- LA Highway 3280

==== Arkansas state highways ====
- AR Highway 4
- AR Highway 7
- AR Highway 8
- AR Highway 9
- AR Highway 15
- AR Highway 19
- AR Highway 24
- AR Highway 26
- AR Highway 27
- AR Highway 29
- AR Highway 32
- AR Highway 41
- AR Highway 51
- AR Highway 53
- AR Highway 84
- AR Highway 88
- AR Highway 98
- AR Highway 108
- AR Highway 129
- AR Highway 134
- AR Highway 151
- AR Highway 160
- AR Highway 196
- AR Highway 237
- AR Highway 245
- AR Highway 296
- AR Highway 355
- AR Highway 549
- AR Highway 874

==== Oklahoma state highways ====
- OK State Highway 3
- OK State Highway 4
- OK State Highway 37
- OK State Highway 87
- OK State Highway 98

=== River transportation ===
River transportation is available through two inland multi-modal transportation and distribution centers along the Red River: the 2,300-acre (3.6 sq mi) Port of Caddo-Bossier, located at the head of navigation on the J. Bennett Johnston Waterway (4 miles [6.4 km] south of Shreveport on LA Highway 1), and the 700-acre (1.1 sq mi) Natchitoches Parish Port, located on Louisiana Highways 6 and 486 (U.S. 71/U.S. 84) in Campti, Louisiana on the only slack water port on the Red River. The Port of Caddo-Bossier began loading its first cargo in 1995, and has (as of 2019) received more than nine million tons of barge freight and over eight million tons of rail freight. The port—which houses more than 17 freight and shipping companies—links the Ark-La-Tex to domestic and international markets via the Mississippi River, and the Gulf Intracoastal Waterway. Bossier City hosts three riverboat casino gambling resorts along the east bank of the Red River: Margaritaville Resort Casino, Horseshoe Bossier City, and Boomtown Bossier City.

== Notable people ==
- David Abner
- Trace Adkins
- Duane Allen
- Maya Angelou
- Oscar P. Austin
- Donna Axum
- Sylura Barron
- Buster Benton
- Raymond Berry
- Brian Blade
- Dan Blocker
- Terry Bradshaw
- Lou Brock
- Kix Brooks
- Willie Brown
- Dez Bryant
- Jerry Bywaters
- Earl Campbell
- Glen Campbell
- Burrell Cannon
- Claire Lee Chennault
- William Childress
- John Chisum
- Kate Chopin
- Van Cliburn
- Bill Clinton
- Johnnie L. Cochran
- Bessie Coleman
- Gary B.B. Coleman
- Barbara Smith Conrad
- Floyd Cramer
- David Crowder
- Bruce M. Davis
- Jimmie Davis
- Clint Dempsey
- Chi Chi DeVayne
- Sandy Duncan
- James Farmer
- Kelli Finglass
- George Foreman
- Lefty Frizzell
- Dannie Flesher
- Lane Frost
- Euell Gibbons
- Johnny Gimble
- Kevin Griffin
- John Wesley Hardin
- Cas Haley
- Robert Harling
- Charlaine Harris
- James Pinckney Henderson
- Don Henley
- Robert Hilburn
- James Stephen "Big Jim" Hogg
- William H. Holland
- Johnny Horton
- Mike Huckabee
- William Humphrey
- Lamar Hunt
- Alphonso Jackson
- Claudia Alta "Lady Bird" Johnson
- Scott Joplin
- Henderson Jordan
- Mitchell Kendall
- Freddie King
- Ben Kweller
- Alan Ladd
- Miranda Lambert
- Joe R. Lansdale
- Tracy Lawrence
- Huddie "Lead Belly" Ledbetter
- Opal Lee
- Jared Leto
- Shannon Leto
- Marguerite Littman
- Horace Logan
- Joshua Logan
- Huey Long
- Patrick Mahomes
- Jeff Mangum
- Johnny Mathis
- Robert N. McClelland
- Sarah McClendon
- Matthew McConaughey
- William Johnson McDonald
- Neal McCoy
- Don Meredith
- Mary Miles Minter
- Craig Monroe
- Bill Moyers
- Kacey Musgraves
- Margie Neal
- Huey P. Newton
- Ne-Yo
- John Osteen
- Wright Patman
- Ross Perot
- Lonnie "Bo" Pilgrim
- Anita Pointer
- Parker Posey
- Ray Price
- Kevin Rahm
- Homer P. Rainey
- Collin Raye
- Jim Reeves
- Tex Ritter
- Phil Robertson
- Eddie Robinson
- Bobby Rush
- Robert Schneider
- Billy Sims
- Shangela
- Kenny Wayne Shepherd
- Allan Shivers
- Tommie Smith
- Sissy Spacek
- Gene Stallings
- Hal Sutton
- Bettye Swann
- B. J. Thomas
- Billy Bob Thornton
- J.D. Tippet
- David Toms
- Jeremiah Trotter
- Tommy Tuberville
- Aaron Thibeaux "T-Bone" Walker
- Walter Prescott Webb
- Forest Whitaker
- Hank Williams, Jr.
- John Edward Williams
- Richard Williams
- Romeo M. Williams
- Victoria Williams
- Wallace Willis
- Dooley Wilson
- Lee Ann Womack
- Andrea Yates
- Faron Young
