= KNCB =

KNCB may refer to:

- KNCB (AM), a radio station (1320 AM) licensed to Vivian, Louisiana, United States
- KNCB-FM, a radio station (105.3 FM) licensed to Vivian, Louisiana, United States
- Koninklijke Nederlandse Cricket Bond (Royal Netherlands Cricket Board), the federation of all Dutch cricket clubs
