= KTFS =

KTFS may refer to:

- KTFS (AM), a radio station (940 AM) licensed to Texarkana, Texas, United States
- KTFS-FM, a radio station (107.1 FM) licensed to Texarkana, Arkansas, United States
- KCMC (AM), a radio station (740 AM) licensed to serve Texarkana, Texas, which held the call sign KTFS from 2014 to 2017

== See also ==
- KTF (disambiguation)
