= KIMP =

Radio station in Mount Pleasant, Texas

- Mount Pleasant, Texas; United States
- Broadcast area: Sulphur Springs, Texas, Paris, Texas
- Frequency: 960 kHz
- Branding: La Super K

Programming
- Format: Regional Mexican

Ownership
- Owner: East Texas Broadcasting, Inc.
- Sister stations: KOYN; KPLT; KSCH

History
- Call sign meaning: La Super K in Mount Pleasant

Technical information
- Licensing authority: FCC
- Facility ID: 29915
- Class: D
- Power: 1,000 watts day; 75 watts night
- Transmitter coordinates: 33°9′54.00″N 95°0′27.00″W
- Translator: See § Translator

Links
- Public license information: Public file; LMS
- Website: easttexasradio.com/stations/kimp-960am/

KIMP (960 AM) is a terrestrial American radio station, paired with an FM translator, and broadcasting a Regional Mexican format. Licensed to Mount Pleasant, Texas, United States, the station is owned by East Texas Broadcasting, Inc.

== Translator ==
Broadcast translator for KIMP
Call sign	Frequency	City of license	FID	ERP (W)	Class	FCC info
K282AM	104.3 FM	Mt. Pleasant, Texas	156992	250	D	LMS
