= KHDY =

KHDY may refer to:

- KHDY (AM), a radio station (1350 AM) licensed to serve Clarksville, Texas, United States
- KHDY-FM, a radio station (98.5 FM) licensed to serve Clarksville, Texas
