= KCMC =

KCMC may refer to:

- KCMC (AM), a radio station (740 AM) licensed to serve Texarkana, Texas, United States
- KCMC-FM, a radio station (94.3 FM) licensed to serve Viola, Arkansas, United States
- KTFS (AM), a radio station (940 AM) licensed to serve Texarkana, Texas, which held the call sign KCMC from 2014 to 2017
