= KPLT =

KPLT may refer to:

- KPLT (AM), a radio station (1490 AM) licensed to Paris, Texas, United States
- KPLT-FM, a radio station (107.7 FM) licensed to Paris, Texas, United States
