= Kbel =

Kbel or KBEL may refer to:

== Places in the Czech Republic ==
- Kbel (Kolín District), a municipality and village in the Central Bohemian Region
- Kbel (Plzeň-South District), a municipality and village in the Plzeň Region
- Kbel, a village and part of Benátky nad Jizerou in the Central Bohemian Region

== Radio stations in the United States ==
- KBEL (AM), a radio station of Oklahoma
- KBEL-FM, a radio station of Oklahoma
