= KSCN =

KSCN may refer to:

- KSCN (FM), a radio station (96.9 FM) licensed to Pittsburg, Texas, United States
- KSCN-TV, a television station (channel 22) licensed to Los Angeles, California, United States
- Potassium thiocyanate, a chemical compound with the molecular formula KSCN
