= KPJC =

KPJC may refer to:

- KPJC-LD, a low-power television station (channel 11, virtual 12) licensed to serve San Francisco, California, United States
- KSLM (AM), a radio station (1220 AM) licensed to serve Salem, Oregon, United States, which held the call sign KPJC from 2007 to 2018
- KZHN, a radio station (1250 AM) licensed to serve Paris, Texas, United States, which held the call sign KPJC from 1999 to 2005
- Zelienople Municipal Airport (ICAO code KPJC), an airport in Pennsylvania, United States
