= KACW =

KACW may refer to:

- KACW (FM), a radio station (91.3 FM) licensed to serve South Bend, Washington, United States
- KOOS, a radio station (107.3 FM) licensed to serve North Bend, Oregon, United States, which held the call sign KACW from 1990 to 2007
- KPLT-FM, a radio station (107.7 FM) licensed to serve Paris, Texas, United States, which held the call sign KACW until 1980
