= KPGG =

Radio station in Ashdown, Arkansas

- Ashdown, Arkansas; United States
- Broadcast area: Texarkana
- Frequency: 103.9 MHz
- Branding: 103.9 The Pig

Programming
- Format: Classic Country

Ownership
- Owner: American Media Investments, Inc.
- Sister stations: KHDY, KEWL-FM, KHDY-FM

History
- First air date: May 19, 1972 (as KMLA-FM)
- Former call signs: KMLA-FM (1972–1990); KTFS-FM (1990–1991); KHSP-FM (1991–1997); KOWS (1997–1998); KHSP-FM (1998–2000); KOWS (2000–2002)
- Call sign meaning: Sounds like "Pig"

Technical information
- Licensing authority: FCC
- Facility ID: 4438
- Class: A
- ERP: 5,100 watts
- HAAT: 108 meters (354 ft)
- Transmitter coordinates: 33°36′6″N 94°4′38″W

Links
- Public license information: Public file; LMS
- Website: amiradiogroup.com/103-9thepig

KPGG (103.9 FM, "Real Rock 103.9 The Pig") is a radio station broadcasting an Classic Country music format. Licensed to Ashdown, Arkansas, United States, it serves the Texarkana area. The station is currently owned by American Media Investments, Inc. Studios are located on College Drive in Texarkana, Texas and its transmitter is in Ogden, Arkansas.

Broadcast personalities include Michael B, Doug Davis, Fabienne Thrash, Brad Ford, and "Milam". Additional weekly programming on the station includes the "Wake Up Call" with Michael B & Doug Davis, Fabe's Lunchtime Requests, "Roots of Country" with Doug Davis, "Sunday's Kind of Country", and "God's Country", featuring gospel music by classic country artists.

== Format change ==
=== Rebranding as "The Pig" ===
On February 4, 2019, KPGG rebranded as "98.5 & 103.9 The Pig", adding a simulcast on KHDY-FM 98.5 FM Clarksville, Texas). The station later dropped the simulcast on January 4, 2021.
