= KTTY =

Radio station in New Boston, Texas

Coordinates: 33.466778°N 94.463528°W

- New Boston, Texas; United States
- Broadcast area: Texarkana, Texas–Arkansas
- Frequency: 105.1 MHz
- Branding: Hits 105

Programming
- Format: Classic hits

Ownership
- Owner: Cliff Dumas; (BTC USA Holdings Management Inc.)
- Sister stations: KBYB, KCMC, KTFS, KTFS-FM, KTOY

History
- First air date: 2009
- Call sign meaning: Kitty (referring to former "Cat Country" branding)

Technical information
- Licensing authority: FCC
- Facility ID: 165971
- Class: A
- ERP: 4,300 watts
- HAAT: 118 meters (387 ft)
- Repeaters: 107.1 KTFS-HD2 (Texarkana, Arkansas)

Links
- Public license information: Public file; LMS
- Webcast: Listen Live
- Website: hits105fm.com

KTTY (105.1 FM) is a radio station licensed to New Boston, Texas, and serving the Texarkana region. Owned by Cliff Dumas, through licensee BTC USA Holdings Management Inc., it broadcasts a classic hits format branded as “Hits 105” and is also simulcast on KTFS-FM HD2. Its studios are located on Olive in Texarkana, Texas just one block west of the Texas/Arkansas state line and its transmitter is in New Boston.

== History ==
KTTY originally operated as a country music station, branded as Cat Country 105.1, under the ownership of Towers Investment Trust. The station went silent in June 2012, and was sold in November 2012 to Texarkana Radio Center. On April 19, 2013, the station returned to air as classic hits Hits 105, also simulcasting on KCMC and the FM translator K288FI.

On January 24, 2017, KTTY announced that it would no longer play music by Madonna, in response to remarks she made during a speech at the Women's March on Washington on January 20, 2017. KTTY's general manager stated that their decision was "not a matter of politics", but "a matter of patriotism", because "it just feels wrong to us to be playing Madonna songs and paying her royalties when the artist has shown un-American sentiments."

Previous logo

On January 22, 2019, KTTY changed its format from classic hits to country, simulcasting KBYB 101.7 FM Hope, AR.

On March 28, 2024 KTTY changed back to classic hits, once again simulcasting on translator K288FI.
