= KBUS =

Radio station in Paris, Texas

- Paris, Texas; United States
- Frequency: 101.9 MHz
- Branding: 101.9 KBUS

Programming
- Format: Classic rock

Ownership
- Owner: East Texas Broadcasting, Inc.
- Sister stations: KALK, KPLT, KPLT-FM, KSCH

History
- First air date: June 3, 1985 (at 103.9)
- Former frequencies: 103.9 MHz (1985–1988)

Technical information
- Licensing authority: FCC
- Facility ID: 71408
- Class: C2
- ERP: 50,000 watts
- HAAT: 150 meters
- Transmitter coordinates: 33°44′54.00″N 95°24′52.00″W

Links
- Public license information: Public file; LMS
- Webcast: Listen Live
- Website: easttexasradio.com/stations/kbus-101-9/

KBUS (101.9 FM) is a radio station broadcasting a classic rock format. Licensed to Paris, Texas, United States, the station serves the Paris area. The station is currently owned by East Texas Broadcasting, Inc. Darren Trip serves as Morning Drive host from 6am - 10am. All other day-parts feature programming from Westwood One.

== History ==
KBUS signed on the air on June 3, 1985 and became the 5th radio station to sign-on in Paris as "K-BUS". When KBUS started to sign-on the air, the station started broadcasting on 103.9 FM and first aired an adult contemporary format. It moved to its present 101.9 FM frequency in 1988. Throughout its earlier years, KBUS shares its building with its sister-station 1250 AM KPRE, a country AM station and was previously part of ABC News Radio.

On September 9, 1991, Lamar County Broadcasters Incorporated who owned both KBUS and KGDD (formerly KPRE) was sold to Charles Webster of Webster Broadcasting Incorporated. By 1994, KBUS changed its format to the current Classic Rock format.

== Former programming ==
During its earlier years, KBUS was an affiliate of the Associated Press. However, during parts of the late 1980s and into the 1990s, KBUS formerly has its own "Solid-Gold Saturday Night" program with a mix of Oldies in its playlist.
