= Romeo M. Williams =

American civil rights attorney

Romeo Marcus Williams (June 4, 1919 – August 16, 1960) was an American civil rights attorney who organized large-scale student protests against segregation in Marshall, Texas. He was also a junior partner of Dallas, Texas civil rights attorney, William J. Durham, who served as lead counsel on two landmark U.S. Supreme Court cases, Sweatt v. Painter (with famed civil rights attorneys Robert L. Carter and future U.S. Supreme Court Associate Justice Thurgood Marshall), and Smith v. Allwright.

Williams was also a U.S. Army Air Force officer and trained fighter pilot with the 332nd Fighter Group, best known as the Tuskegee Airmen.

== Early life, family ==
Williams was born on June 4, 1919, in Marshall, Texas's predominantly African American Sunny South neighborhood. He was the son of Milton Williams Sr., owner of the Peoples Funeral Home, a funeral establishment founded in 1923 and have been located across the street from the historically black college and university Bishop College. Williams was also the son of Josie P. Campbell Williams, East Texas's first African American female funeral director. Williams Sr and his wife also founded six other funeral homes as well as the Peoples Funeral Service Insurance Company.

Williams had two siblings: Milton Williams Jr. and Joseph Williams. After Milton's Sr.'s death in 1966 and Josie's death in 1975, Milton Williams Jr. ran the family's funeral business until his death in 1992. William's Jr.'s son, Milton Williams III, a U.S. Air Force Captain and missile crew commander, ran the family business until his death in 2014. Milton Williams III's wife, Julia Frilot Williams, manages the business with her daughter Kelli.

In 1933, Williams completed Marshall Public Schools' grade school, and enrolled at H. B. Pemberton High School. An exceptional student, Williams played saxophone in the school's band, and played on the American football and baseball teams.

Williams attend Prairie View A&M College (now Prairie View A&M University). After one year there, Williams transferred to Bishop College, where he graduated on May 23, 1941, with a Bachelor of Science Degree. On February 13, 1939, Williams was initiated as a member of Omega Psi Phi fraternity.

Though he briefly worked at his family's funeral business after graduating from Bishop College, Williams set his sights on becoming a fighter pilot after the Japanese attacked Pearl Harbor on December 7, 1941.

On June 10, 1951, Williams married Edith Arbuckle Williams in Dallas, Texas, honeymooning in New Orleans, Louisiana.

== Military career ==
In 1942, he became the first African American in East Texas youth to pass the U.S. Army Air Corps entrance exam. On December 13, 1942, he graduated as a member of the Single Engine Section Cadet Class SE-42-K, receiving his wings and commission as a 2nd Lieutenant. Despite not engaging in combat during World War II, he transported various aircraft across the United States.

On September 15, 1945, he was honorably discharged with the rank of 1st Lieutenant.

== Post-Military, Career as Civil Rights Attorney ==
After his discharge he planned to attend law school. However, at the time, no schools in Texas admitted African Americans.

Nonetheless, Williams moved to St. Louis, Missouri to attend the now-defunct Lincoln University School of Law, graduating with a juris doctor on June 6, 1949. Soon after, Williams became a junior partner at the Dallas, Texas law firm of William J. Durham, a prominent civil rights attorney who served as co-lead counsel on two landmark U.S. Supreme Court cases, Sweatt v. Painter (with famed civil rights attorneys Robert L. Carter and future U.S. Supreme Court Associate Justice Thurgood Marshall), and Smith v. Allwright. During his seven-year legal career in Dallas, Williams co-founded on May 4, 1952, the Barristers' Club (later renamed the "J. L. Turner Legal Association"), an African American bar association. Co-founders included C.W. Asberry, L.A. Bedford, C.B. Bunkley Jr., W.J. Durham, Kenneth F. Holbert, D.H. Mason, Robert Rlce, L. Clayton River, U. Simpson Tate, and J.L. Turner Jr. The associated met monthly to discuss tactics to combat discrimination inside and outside the legal profession. As a result of these Williams and his fellow attorneys' activism and legal prowess, the NAACP, in the early 1950s, located its southwest regional office to Dallas.

In 1956, Williams moved back to Marshall, Texas to establish his own civil rights law practice next door to his family's funeral home.

Between March and August 1960, Williams helped organized large student courthouse marches and sit-ins of F. W. Woolworth and bus station lunch counters. At the courthouse, firemen used water hoses on many students, arresting students on charges of unlawful assembly.

== Death, Desegregation in Marshall, Texas ==
On August 16, 1960, Williams defended students in Marshall, Texas who were arrested while participating in civil rights sit-ins and demonstrations. While driving two student clients, Mae Etta Johnson and Bernice Halley, back to their boarding house, a railroad switching engine struck Williams' automobile, immediately killing Williams and Johnson and permanently injuring Halley.

Williams' family funeral home held Williams' funeral at Marshall's New Bethel Baptist Church. Bishop College President Milton K. Curry performed the eulogy. Williams was interred on his family's plot at Powder Mill Cemetery in Marshall.

On December 14, 1960, Court of Criminal Appeals of Texas reversed and dismissed all convictions against the students. Soon after, Marshall desegregated all public facilities.
