= KOYN =

Radio station in Paris, Texas

- Paris, Texas; United States
- Frequency: 93.9 MHz
- Branding: 93.9 KOYN

Programming
- Format: Country music
- Affiliations: ABC Radio

Ownership
- Owner: East Texas Broadcasting, Inc.
- Sister stations: KIMP; KSCH

History
- First air date: December 8, 1987; 38 years ago (as KSMP)
- Former call signs: KSMP (1987–1988)

Technical information
- Licensing authority: FCC
- Facility ID: 7992
- Class: C2
- ERP: 50,000 watts
- HAAT: 150.0 meters
- Transmitter coordinates: 33°49′36.00″N 95°27′49.00″W

Links
- Public license information: Public file; LMS
- Website: easttexasradio.com/stations/koyn-93-9/

KOYN (93.9 FM) is a radio station broadcasting a country music format. Licensed to Paris, Texas, United States, the station is owned by East Texas Broadcasting, Inc. and features programming from ABC Radio.

== History ==
The station went on the air as KSMP on December 8, 1987. On June 9, 1988, the station changed its call sign to the current KOYN.

== Air Staff ==
"The Caffeinated Country Morning Show with Ivy Lee" is on-air 6am to 10am Monday to Friday.
