= KTF (disambiguation) =

KTF a may refer to:

- KTF, or Korea Telecom Freetel
- Kokoda Track Foundation
- Takaka Aerodrome IATA code
- Khalistan Tiger Force, a pro-Khalistan (Sikh separatist) militant group in India

== See also ==
- KTFS (disambiguation)
