= Dan Flores =

American writer and historian

- Born: Dan Louie Flores; October 19, 1948 (age 78); Vivian, Caddo Parish; Louisiana, United States
- Education: Northwestern State University; Texas A&M University
- Occupations: Writer, Historian; Professor Emeritus at the University of Montana
- Years active: 1980–present
- Spouses: Susan I. Flores (m. 1972; div. 1978) Sara Dant (m. 2014)

Dan Louie Flores (born October 19, 1948) is an American writer and historian who specializes in cultural and environmental studies of the American West. He held the A.B. Hammond Chair in Western History at the University of Montana in Missoula, Montana until he retired in May 2014.

== Background ==
Dan Flores is a writer who lives in the Galisteo Valley outside Santa Fe, New Mexico, and is A. B. Hammond Professor Emeritus of Western History at the University of Montana-Missoula. Flores was born in Vivian in Caddo Parish in northwestern Louisiana and grew up in nearby Rodessa. During the 1970s, he received his MA in history from Northwestern State University in Natchitoches, Louisiana, and his Ph.D. in 1978 from Texas A&M University in College Station, Texas, where he studied under Professor Herbert H. Lang. He began his academic career at Texas Tech University in Lubbock, where he taught from 1978 to 1992, spent a year at the University of Wyoming in 1986, and then relocated to the University of Montana, where he held the A.B. Hammond Chair in Western History from 1992 until he retired in May 2014.

Flores appeared in the 2023 Ken Burns documentary The American Buffalo.

== Works ==
=== Books ===
Flores is the author of thirteen books.

- Jefferson & Southwestern Exploration (Norman: University of Oklahoma Press, 1984; paperback edition, 1986)
- Journal of an Indian Trader: Anthony Glass and the Texas Trading Frontier, 1790-1810 (College Station: Texas A&M University Press, 1985; paperback edition, 1998)
- Canyon Visions: Photographs and Pastels of the Texas Plains, with Amy Winton, foreword by Larry McMurtry (Lubbock: Texas Tech University Press, 1989; paperback edition, 1989)
- Caprock Canyonlands: Journeys into the Heart of the Southern Plains (Austin and London: University of Texas Press, 1990; paperback edition, 1997)
- The Mississippi Kite: Portrait of a Southern Hawk, with Eric Bolen (Austin: University of Texas Press, 1993)
- Horizontal Yellow: Nature and History in the Near Southwest (Albuquerque: University of New Mexico Press, 1999; paperback edition, 1999)
- Southern Counterpart to Lewis & Clark: The Freeman & Custis Expedition of 1806 (Norman: University of Oklahoma Press, Red River Books paperback, 2nd edition, 2002)
- The Natural West: Environmental History in the Great Plains and Rocky Mountains (Norman: University of Oklahoma Press, 2001; paperback edition, 2003)
- Caprock Canyonlands: Journeys into the Heart of the Southern Plains, 20th Anniversary Edition (College Station: Texas A&M University Press, 2010)
- Visions of the Big Sky: Painting and Photographing the Northern Rocky Mountain West (Norman: University of Oklahoma Press, 2010)
- American Serengeti: The Last Big Animals of the Great Plains (Lawrence: University Press of Kansas, 2016)
- Coyote America: A Natural and Supernatural History (New York: Basic/Perseus, 2016)
- Wild New World: The Epic Story of Animals and People in America (New York: W.W. Norton, 2022).

== Awards and honors ==
Flores' work has received numerous accolades and awards including:

- Stubbendieck Great Plains Distinguished Book Prize, 2017, Winner, for American Serengeti
- Society of American Historians Member, elected 2017.
- 2017 Sigurd F. Olson Nature Writing Award Winner for Coyote America
- Best Non-Fiction Book, 2017 Wrangler Award Winner, Western Heritage Association and National Cowboy Museum, for American Serengeti
- PEN 2017 E.O. Wilson Literary Science Writing Award Finalist for Coyote America: A Natural and Supernatural History
- Best Western Historical NonFiction, 2017, Finalist, Western Writers of America Spur Award, for American Serengeti

== Critical reception ==
Flores' Wild New World has drawn praise as "An outstanding addition to the literature on the ecological history of America." For his Coyote America, Publishers Weekly commended "Flores’s mix of edification and entertainment" as "a welcome antidote to a creature so often viewed with fear." While Thomas Andrews acknowledges “Flores’s longstanding expertise in the environmental history of the American West” and commends his “boundless respect, thoughtfulness, and good humor” in writing Coyote America. Historian Elliott West has called Flores "one of the most respected environmental historians of his generation" and William Kittredge concurs, stating that Flores belongs in "the ranks of first-string Western American writers." "Engaging and provocative," "personal, passionate, and scholarly," Flores' work draws broad praise, including from author William deBuys, who calls Horizontal Yellow "one of the best books about place you'll ever read.".

== Archives ==
Dan Flores' archives, research papers, and extensive photographs are housed in the Conservation Collection of the Western History and Genealogy Division of the Denver Public Library.
