= KNBB =

- Dubach, Louisiana; United States
- Broadcast area: Ruston micropolitan area
- Frequency: 97.7 MHz
- Branding: Sportstalk 97.7

Programming
- Language: English
- Format: Sports
- Network: Fox Sports Radio
- Affiliations: Louisiana Tech Bulldogs and Lady Techsters; LSU Tigers

Ownership
- Owner: Red Peach Radio; (Red Peach LLC)
- Sister stations: KPCH, KXKZ, KRUS

History
- First air date: June 4, 1984
- Former call signs: KPCH (1984–2006)

Technical information
- Licensing authority: FCC
- Facility ID: 5065
- Class: C2
- ERP: 50,000 watts
- HAAT: 141.4 meters (464 ft)
- Transmitter coordinates: 32°28′53″N 92°40′34″W

Links
- Public license information: Public file; LMS
- Webcast: Listen live
- Website: www.redpeachlive.com/sportstalk977

KNBB (97.7 FM) is a broadcast radio station in the United States. Licensed to Dubach, Louisiana, the station serves the Ruston, Louisiana area with a sports format branded Sportstalk 97.7. The station's broadcast license is held by Red Peach LLC.

The station was founded by William W. Brown in 1984 as KPCH and broadcast with adult contemporary, easy listening, and oldies music formats in its early history. Brown sold KPCH in 2003 for $1.5 million to Communications Capital Managers. In 2007, the original KPCH switched its call sign and format with sports station KNBB. The new KNBB became the local home of the ESPN Radio network and Louisiana Tech University sports. In 2017, KNBB changed its national network affiliation to Fox Sports Radio.

== History ==
=== As KPCH (1984–2006) ===
Founded by William W. Brown, the station first signed on as KPCH on June 4, 1984. It was officially licensed on September 24, 1984 to Dubach, Louisiana. KPCH was originally a music station; the 1987 Broadcasting Yearbook listed its format as adult contemporary. In 1988, KPCH became an easy listening station. By 1992, KPCH added oldies and five hours a week of gospel music. The following year, KPCH changed to a full time 1950s to 1970s oldies format branded "K-Peach 97FM".

Beginning around 2000, KPCH began broadcasting LSU Tigers football games; the affiliation remains active as of 2024.

In April 2003, Communications Capital Managers LLC purchased KPCH from Brown for $1.5 million. Communications Capital rebranded KPCH as "The Peach 97.7".

=== As KNBB (2007–present) ===
KPCH swapped formats and call signs with 99.3 KNBB on January 1, 2007. Branded "ESPN 97.7", the new KNBB changed from oldies to sports, carrying a local afternoon talk show, national programming from ESPN Radio, and Louisiana Tech University sports.

In October 2017, KNBB rebranded as "Sports Talk 97.7" and changed its national network affiliation from ESPN to Fox Sports Radio.

On April 29, 2020, the station went silent due to a thunderstorm knocking down its broadcast tower. The station's programming temporarily moved to sister station 99.3 KPCH. KNBB resumed broadcasting on 97.7 on May 12, 2021.

== Programming ==
KNBB has local sports shows in morning and afternoon drive times; other hours have Fox Sports Radio. On game days, KNBB broadcasts live play-by-play coverage of Louisiana Tech Lady Techsters basketball, Louisiana Tech Bulldogs baseball, and LSU Tigers football. KNBB also carries a weekly talk show with the head coaches of Louisiana Tech football and Louisiana Tech Bulldogs basketball during their teams' seasons.

== Technical information ==
KNBB broadcasts with 50 kilowatts of effective radiated power, both horizontally and vertically. The transmitter site for KNBB is in the Unionville section of city of license Dubach, near the intersection of U.S. Route 167 and State Highway 822. The station studios for KNBB and other Red Peach stations are near downtown Ruston, about two-thirds of a mile east of the Louisiana Tech University campus.
