= KRUS =

- Ruston, Louisiana; United States
- Broadcast area: Ruston-Grambling
- Frequency: 1490 kHz
- Branding: Hitz 96.3

Programming
- Format: Urban contemporary
- Affiliations: Compass Media Networks

Ownership
- Owner: Red Peach Radio; (Red Peach LLC)
- Sister stations: KNBB, KPCH, KXKZ

History
- First air date: December 17, 1947
- Call sign meaning: Ruston

Technical information
- Licensing authority: FCC
- Facility ID: 58272
- Class: C
- Power: 1,000 watts (unlimited)
- Transmitter coordinates: 32°30′48″N 92°39′56″W
- Translator: 96.3 K242DA (Ruston)

Links
- Public license information: Public file; LMS
- Webcast: Listen Live
- Website: www.redpeachlive.com/hitz963/

KRUS (1490 AM, "Hitz 96.3") is an American radio station licensed to Ruston, Louisiana. The station is owned by Red Peach LLC. The station broadcasting a rhythmic-leaning urban contemporary music format. The station transmitter is located in South Ruston and the studio is located in Downtown Ruston.

The station was assigned the KRUS call letters by the Federal Communications Commission on December 17, 1947.

On March 2, 2021, KRUS changed its format from urban gospel to urban contemporary, branded as "Hitz 96.3"
