= KBYB =

- Hope, Arkansas; United States
- Broadcast area: Texarkana area
- Frequency: 101.7 MHz
- Branding: 101.7 Hot FM

Programming
- Format: Country music

Ownership
- Owner: Cliff Dumas; (BTC USA Holdings Management Inc.)
- Sister stations: KCMC, KTFS, KTFS-FM, KTOY, KTTY

History
- First air date: 1984; 42 years ago
- Former call signs: KXAR-FM (1984–2001); KTXO (2001–2003); KJMY (2003–2004)

Technical information
- Licensing authority: FCC
- Facility ID: 33762
- Class: C2
- ERP: 50,000 watts
- HAAT: 150 meters (490 ft)
- Transmitter coordinates: 33°40′46.4″N 93°49′42.6″W
- Translator: 99.3 K257FY (Texarkana, Texas)

Links
- Public license information: Public file; LMS
- Webcast: Listen Live
- Website: 1017hotfm.com

KBYB (101.7 FM, "Hot FM") is a radio station broadcasting a country music format. Licensed to Hope, Arkansas, United States, it serves the Texarkana area. The station is currently owned by Cliff Dumas, through licensee BTC USA Holdings Management Inc. Studios are located on Olive in Texarkana, Texas just one block west of the Texas/Arkansas state line and its transmitter is north of Fulton, Arkansas.

== History ==
On May 28, 2013, KBYB changed its format from adult hits (as "Bob FM") to country, branded as "101.7 Hot FM".

== Translator ==
Broadcast translator for KBYB
Call sign	Frequency	City of license	FID	ERP (W)	HAAT	Class	Transmitter coordinates	FCC info
K257FY	99.3 FM	Texarkana, Texas	156971	250	126 m (413 ft)	D	33°25′45.4″N 94°7′11.7″W	LMS
