= William J. Durham =

American lawyer

William J. Durham (1896–1970) was a resident of Sherman, Texas, for much of his life. He was notable as an African-American attorney and leader in the civil rights movement.

== Biography ==
Born on a farm near Sulphur Springs, Texas, Durham attended Emporia State University in Kansas. After serving in the United States Army in France during World War I, he moved to Sherman where he studied law in the office of a white attorney, Benjamin F. Gafford. Durham was admitted to the bar in 1926 and began practicing law.

Durham spent the rest of his life fighting for equal rights for blacks in Texas, despite a race riot in Sherman in May 1930, where the black business district, including Durham's office, was burned. He became a leader in the Texas NAACP and served as the attorney in more than forty civil rights cases that sought to end segregation throughout Texas.

His most famous case was Sweatt v. Painter (1950) which resulted in the integration of the University of Texas School of Law. Durham and Thurgood Marshall worked closely in crafting this case from quarters in the Durham family home in Sherman.

Durham eventually moved his practice to Dallas, Texas, and practiced law there for many years. When he died on December 22, 1970, he was buried in Greenville Cemetery in Greenville, Texas.
