= KALK =

Radio station in Winfield, Texas

- Winfield, Texas; United States
- Broadcast area: Paris, Texas
- Frequency: 97.7 MHz
- Branding: K-Lake 97.7

Programming
- Format: Classic hits

Ownership
- Owner: East Texas Broadcasting, Inc.
- Sister stations: KBUS, KPLT, KPLT-FM, KSCH

History
- First air date: September 27, 1987
- Former call signs: KLSB (1986–1988); KYKM (1988–1991)
- Call sign meaning: Similar to "lake"

Technical information
- Licensing authority: FCC
- Facility ID: 51689
- Class: C3
- ERP: 22,500 watts
- HAAT: 100 meters (330 ft)
- Transmitter coordinates: 33°11′1.00″N 95°12′32.00″W

Links
- Public license information: Public file; LMS
- Webcast: Listen live
- Website: easttexasradio.com/stations/k-lake-97-7/

KALK (97.7 FM) is a radio station broadcasting a classic hits format. Licensed to Winfield, Texas, United States, the station serves the Paris area. The station is currently owned by East Texas Broadcasting, Inc.

== History ==
The station went on the air as KLSB on September 27, 1987. On October 1, 1988, the station changed its call sign to KYKM, and on January 1, 1991, to the current KALK.

As of October 20, 2011, K-LAKE tweaked its format from adult hits to classic hits.
