= KTRG =

- Hooks, Texas; United States
- Broadcast area: Texarkana, Texas
- Frequency: 94.1 MHz
- Branding: Fox Sports 94.1

Programming
- Format: Sports radio
- Affiliations: Fox Sports Radio

Ownership
- Owner: E Radio Network LLC
- Sister stations: KKTK

History
- First air date: 2012

Technical information
- Licensing authority: FCC
- Facility ID: 183376
- Class: A
- ERP: 2,350 watts
- HAAT: 155.7 meters (511 ft)
- Transmitter coordinates: 33°30′24″N 94°12′25″W

Links
- Public license information: Public file; LMS

KTRG (94.1 FM) is a radio station licensed to Hooks, Texas, serving the Texarkana, Texas area. The station broadcasts a sports format and is owned by E Radio Network LLC. Studios were located along Summerhill Road in northwest Texarkana, and the transmitter was located northwest of Texarkana city limits in Bowie County.

Previous logo
