= KXKZ =

- Ruston, Louisiana; United States
- Broadcast area: Ruston-Grambling
- Frequency: 107.5 MHz
- Branding: Z107.5

Programming
- Language: English
- Format: Country
- Affiliations: United Stations Radio Networks; Westwood One

Ownership
- Owner: Red Peach Radio; (Red Peach LLC)
- Sister stations: KNBB, KPCH, KRUS

History
- First air date: 1993

Technical information
- Licensing authority: FCC
- Facility ID: 58273
- Class: C
- ERP: 100,000 watts
- HAAT: 325 meters (1,066 ft)
- Transmitter coordinates: 32°26′37.00″N 92°42′43.00″W

Links
- Public license information: Public file; LMS
- Webcast: Listen live
- Website: z1075fm.com

KXKZ (107.5 FM, "Z107.5") is an American radio station broadcasting a country music format. Licensed to Ruston, Louisiana, United States, the station serves Ruston, Monroe, and surrounding areas. The station is currently owned by Red Peach LLC. The station transmitter is located in Unincorporated area in Jackson Parish and the studio is located in Downtown Ruston.

In addition to country music the station is the flagship station for Louisiana Tech Bulldogs sports and also broadcast Ruston High School football from 1947-2023.

One of the station's notable personalities is "Mountain Man", a semi-regular on the show Duck Dynasty. He co-hosts "The Patrick and Mountain Man Show" on Monday afternoons from 3-6 PM.
