= KPCH =

Ruston, Louisiana; United States
- Broadcast area: Ruston-Grambling
- Frequency: 99.3 MHz
- Branding: The Peach 99.3

Programming
- Language: English
- Format: Classic hits
- Affiliations: Grambling State Tigers; United Stations Radio Networks

Ownership
- Owner: Red Peach Radio; (Red Peach LLC)
- Sister stations: KNBB, KXKZ, KRUS

History
- First air date: May 1999
- Former call signs: KBDJ (1998–1999); KNBB (1999–2007)
- Call sign meaning: Peach

Technical information
- Licensing authority: FCC
- Facility ID: 5065
- Class: C3
- ERP: 24,500 watts
- HAAT: 101 meters (331 ft)
- Transmitter coordinates: 32°28′53″N 92°40′34″W

Links
- Public license information: Public file; LMS
- Webcast: Listen live
- Website: thepeach993.com

KPCH (99.3 FM, "The Peach") is a broadcast radio station in the United States. Licensed to Ruston, Louisiana, the station broadcasts a classic hits format. Its broadcast license is held by Red Peach LLC.

First signing on as KNBB in 1999, the station originally had an adult contemporary music format from 1999 to 2005 and broadcast Louisiana Tech University baseball and women's basketball. Then from 2005 to 2006, the station had a sports format featuring ESPN Radio, local high school sports, Louisiana Tech baseball, and Grambling State University football. On the first day of 2007, the original KNBB swapped format and call sign with KPCH, and the new KPCH became an oldies station while continuing to broadcast Grambling State football.

== History ==
=== As KNBB (1999–2006) ===
Founded by Ruston Broadcasting in 1998 as KBDJ, the station first signed on as KNBB in May 1999. It was branded "B99.3" and had an adult contemporary music format.

Communications Capital Managers LLC purchased KNBB, KRUS, and KXKZ from Ruston Broadcasting for a combined $2.97 million in August 2001. KNBB added Louisiana Tech University sports to its programming. In the 2001–02 season, KNBB broadcast seven Louisiana Tech Lady Techsters basketball games, followed by three games in 2002–03. For Louisiana Tech Bulldogs baseball, KPCH broadcast 41 games in 2003 and 33 games in 2004. In 2003 and 2004, KNBB broadcast football games for the Cedar Creek School, a Ruston private high school.

In May 2005, KNBB changed to a sports format branded "ESPN Radio 99.3" featuring local sports talk, the ESPN Radio national network, Louisiana Tech baseball, and Grambling State University football.

=== As KPCH (2007–present) ===
On January 1, 2007, KNBB swapped its call sign and format with Dubach station KPCH (97.7). The new KPCH became an oldies station branded "The Peach 99.3". In addition to music, KPCH continued to broadcast local high school sports and Grambling State football.

The former sports programming from KNBB days made a temporary return on KPCH beginning April 29, 2020 after the transmitter for the new KNBB was damaged during a thunderstorm. KPCH's music programming temporarily moved to KOUS-LP in Monroe.

== Programming ==
With local hosts in mornings and evenings, KPCH plays classic hits mostly from the 1970s and 1980s. On Sunday nights, KPCH broadcasts America's Greatest Hits, a program hosted by Scott Shannon nationally syndicated by United Stations Radio Networks. KPCH also broadcasts Grambling State University football games.
