= KKTK =

- Texarkana, Texas; United States
- Broadcast area: Texarkana metropolitan area
- Frequency: 1400 kHz
- Branding: The Buzz

Programming
- Format: News/talk
- Affiliations: Fox News Radio

Ownership
- Owner: E Radio Network LLC
- Sister stations: KTRG

History
- First air date: 1946 (as KTFS)
- Former call signs: KTFS (1946–1988); KMLA (1988–1990); KTFS (1990–1991); KHSP (1991–1998); KOWS (1998–1999); KEWL (1999–2002); KKTK (2002–2005); KEWL (2005–2007)
- Call sign meaning: K-TalK (former branding)

Technical information
- Licensing authority: FCC
- Facility ID: 4439
- Class: C
- Power: 1,000 watts
- Transmitter coordinates: 33°26′34″N 94°3′20″W
- Translator: 97.1 K246CR (Texarkana)

Links
- Public license information: Public file; LMS

KKTK (1400 AM, "The Buzz") is an American radio station broadcasting a news/talk format. Licensed to Texarkana, Texas, United States, it serves the Texarkana metropolitan area. The station, established in 1946, is currently owned by E Radio Network LLC.

The station was reassigned the KKTK call sign by the Federal Communications Commission on February 7, 2007.

On November 8, 2023, Freed AM Corp. and MLS Broadcasting shut down 6 radio stations. E Radio Network, LLC received FCC approval to acquire the stations in an all cash transaction.
