= KTOY =

Radio station in Texarkana, Arkansas

- Texarkana, Arkansas; United States
- Broadcast area: Texarkana area
- Frequency: 104.7 MHz
- Branding: 104.7 KTOY

Programming
- Format: Urban adult contemporary
- Affiliations: Compass Media Networks

Ownership
- Owner: Cliff Dumas; (BTC USA Holdings Management Inc.)
- Sister stations: KBYB, KCMC, KTFS, KTFS-FM, KTTY

History
- First air date: 1992; 34 years ago

Technical information
- Licensing authority: FCC
- Facility ID: 31348
- Class: A
- ERP: 3,100 watts
- HAAT: 138 meters (453 ft)
- Transmitter coordinates: 33°25′45.4″N 94°7′11.7″W

Links
- Public license information: Public file; LMS

KTOY (104.7 FM) is a radio station broadcasting an urban adult contemporary format licensed to Texarkana, Arkansas, United States, and serving the Texarkana area. The station is licensed to BTC USA Holdings Management Inc. Its studios are located on Olive in Texarkana, Texas, just one block west of the Texas–Arkansas state line, and its transmitter is in Wake Village, Texas.

== History ==
On June 16, 1988, Jo-Al Broadcasting, Inc. (named for shareholders Emmie Jo Gamble and her brother-in-law Alcus Davis) filed for a construction permit to build a new radio station on 104.7 MHz in Texarkana, Arkansas. Gamble had been inspired to file after seeing a newspaper article concerning efforts by the Federal Communications Commission to promote women and minority ownership in broadcasting. It was one of three applicants for the frequency, competing with B & H Broadcasting System, Inc., and Dupre' Broadcasting Co. After the three applications were designated for comparative hearing in 1990, the applicants settled, and Jo-Al was granted the frequency.

Gamble, a math teacher, continued teaching while building out the station, which took the call sign KTOY and became the first black-owned station in the state of Arkansas, with the same urban adult contemporary format it still carries. She did not retire from teaching until 2000.

In February 2005, after three years of discussions, Gamble and Davis sold KTOY to Arklatex LLC, which owned four other radio stations in the market. The transaction was described as putting a "jewel" in the company's crown, as KTOY had become the area's top radio station. Eight years later, the stations were sold to Alaska Broadcast Communications, which was 20 percent owned by Richard Burns, for $2.75 million; Burns, an Australian citizen, became the first non-American national to own 100 percent of a United States broadcast station when the FCC approved a first-of-its-kind waiver in 2017, allowing Burns and his wife Sharon to take full ownership of the Frontier Media group.

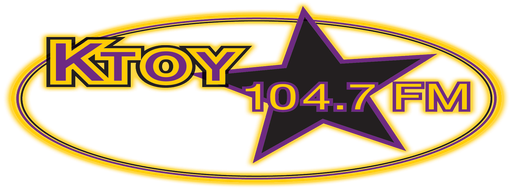
Previous logo

As part of a series of format shifts at the Frontier Media stations in January 2019, KTFS (940 AM) relaunched as "KTOY Gospel", a gospel-formatted brand extension of KTOY. Effective April 28, 2023, Frontier Media sold KTOY to Cliff Dumas's BTC USA Holdings Management Inc. for $60,000.
