= Vivian, Louisiana =

- Town
- Town of Vivian
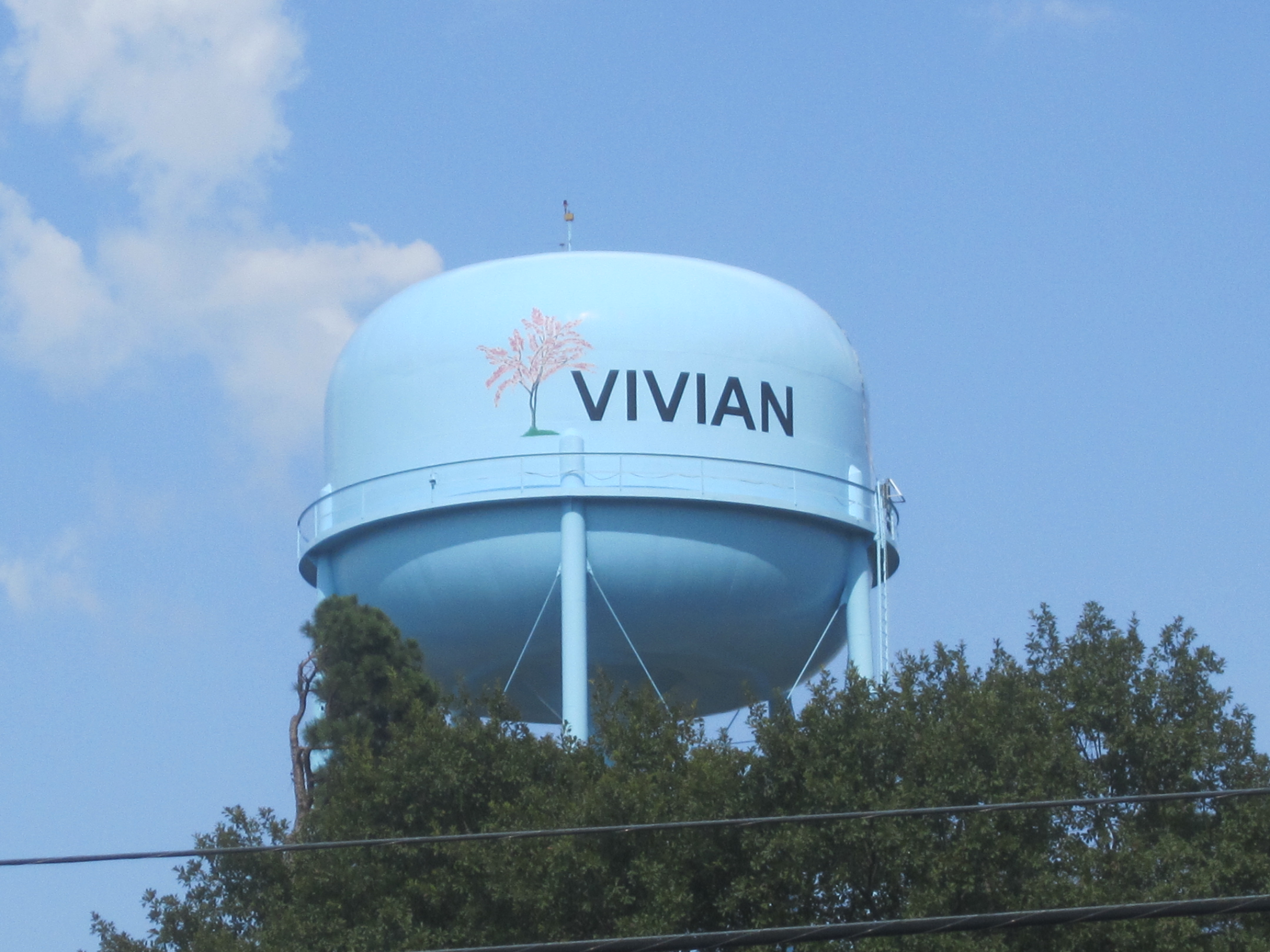
- Vivian water tower

- Location of Vivian in Caddo Parish, Louisiana.

- Location of Louisiana in the United States
- Coordinates: 32°52′16″N 93°59′52″W
- Country: United States
- State: Louisiana
- Parish: Caddo

Area
  - Total: 5.52 sq mi (14.29 km^{2})
  - Land: 5.52 sq mi (14.29 km^{2})
  - Water: 0 sq mi (0.00 km^{2})
- Elevation: 253 ft (77 m)

Population (2020)
  - Total: 3,073
  - Rank: CD: 2nd
  - Density: 557.0/sq mi (215.06/km^{2})
- Time zone: UTC-6 (CST)
  - Summer (DST): UTC-5 (CDT)
- ZIP code: 71082
- Area code: 318
- FIPS code: 22-78890
- GNIS feature ID: 2406806
- Website: townofvivian.us

Vivian is a town in Caddo Parish, Louisiana, United States and is home to the Redbud Festival. The population was 3,073 at the 2020 census. According to 2020 census data, Vivian is now the fourth-largest municipality in Caddo Parish by population (after Blanchard, Greenwood, and Shreveport).

== History ==
Settlement likely began after the construction of the Kansas City Southern Railway through the area in 1898. This caused people to move from their communities on nearby Caddo Lake to be closer to the railroad station. Vivian was incorporated as a town in the same year.

Vivian is locally known for their annual Louisiana Redbud Festival. Originally founded on March 26, 1964, the town claims that it is "one of the longest running festivals in the state of Louisiana".

== Geography ==
Vivian is in northwestern Caddo Parish. Louisiana Highway 1 passes through the center of the town, leading north 11 miles (18 km) to the Texas border at the northwest corner of Louisiana, and south 30 miles (48 km) to Shreveport. LA 2 leads east 7 miles (11 km) to U.S. Route 71 in Hosston.

According to the United States Census Bureau, Vivian has an area of 5.5 square miles (14.2 km^{2}), all land.

== Demographics ==
Historical population
| Census | Pop. | Note | %± |
|---|---|---|---|
| 1910 | 826 | | — |
| 1920 | 1,864 | | 125.7% |
| 1930 | 1,646 | | −11.7% |
| 1940 | 2,460 | | 49.5% |
| 1950 | 2,426 | | −1.4% |
| 1960 | 2,624 | | 8.2% |
| 1970 | 4,046 | | 54.2% |
| 1980 | 4,225 | | 4.4% |
| 1990 | 4,156 | | −1.6% |
| 2000 | 4,031 | | −3.0% |
| 2010 | 3,671 | | −8.9% |
| 2020 | 3,073 | | −16.3% |
| 2025 (est.) | 2,920 | ▼ | −5.0% |
U.S. Decennial Census

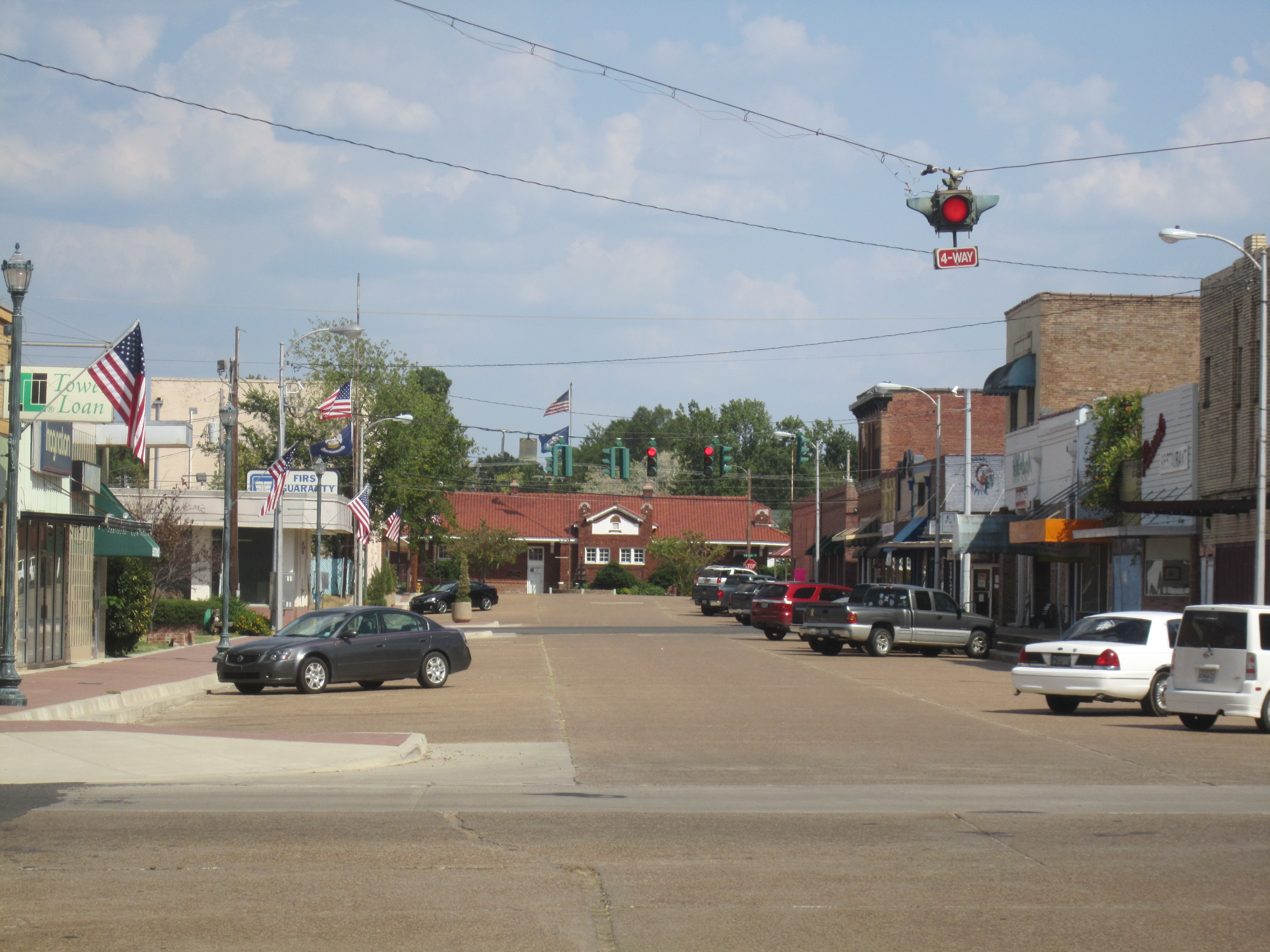
A look at downtown Vivian

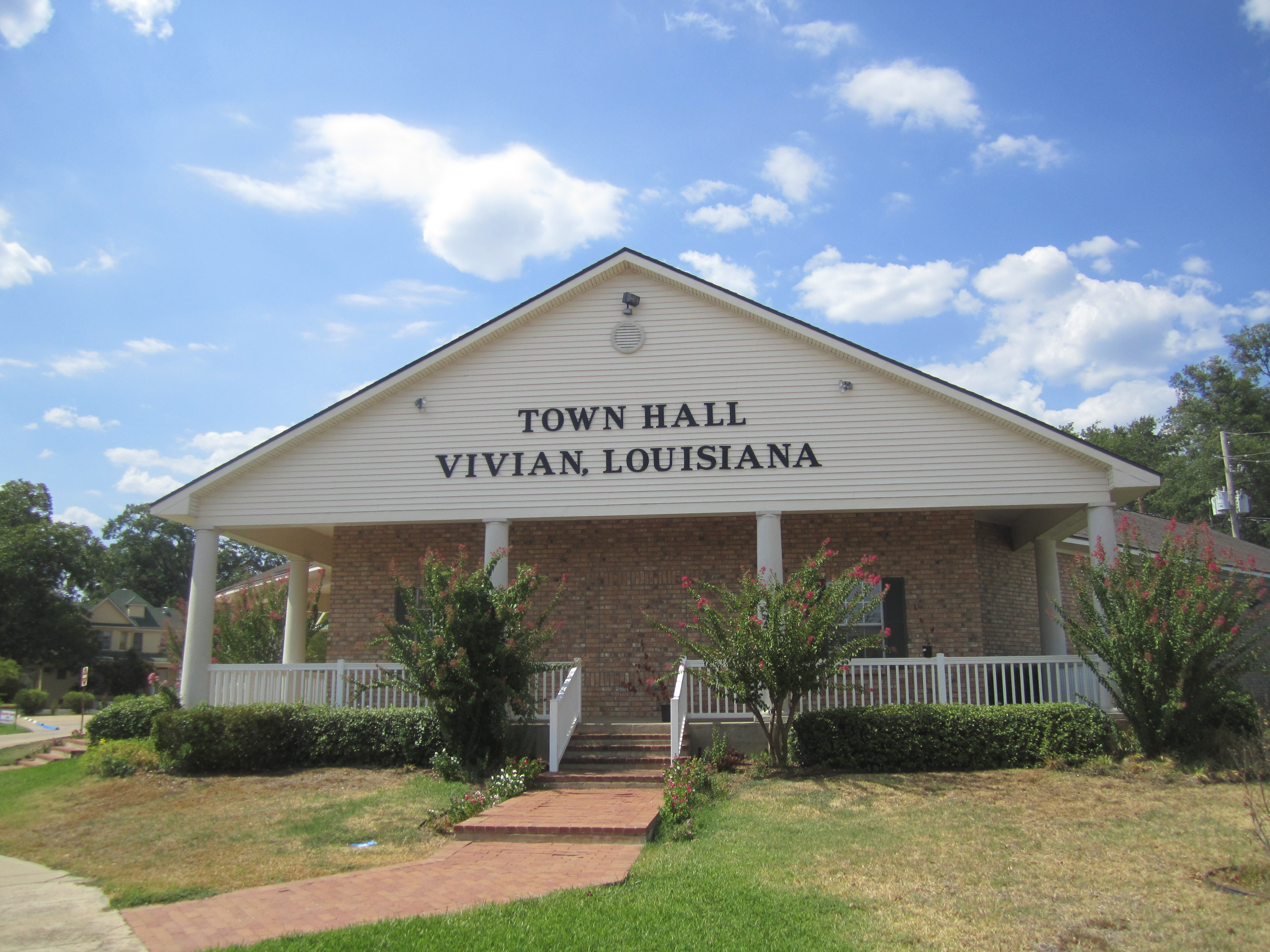
Vivian Town Hall

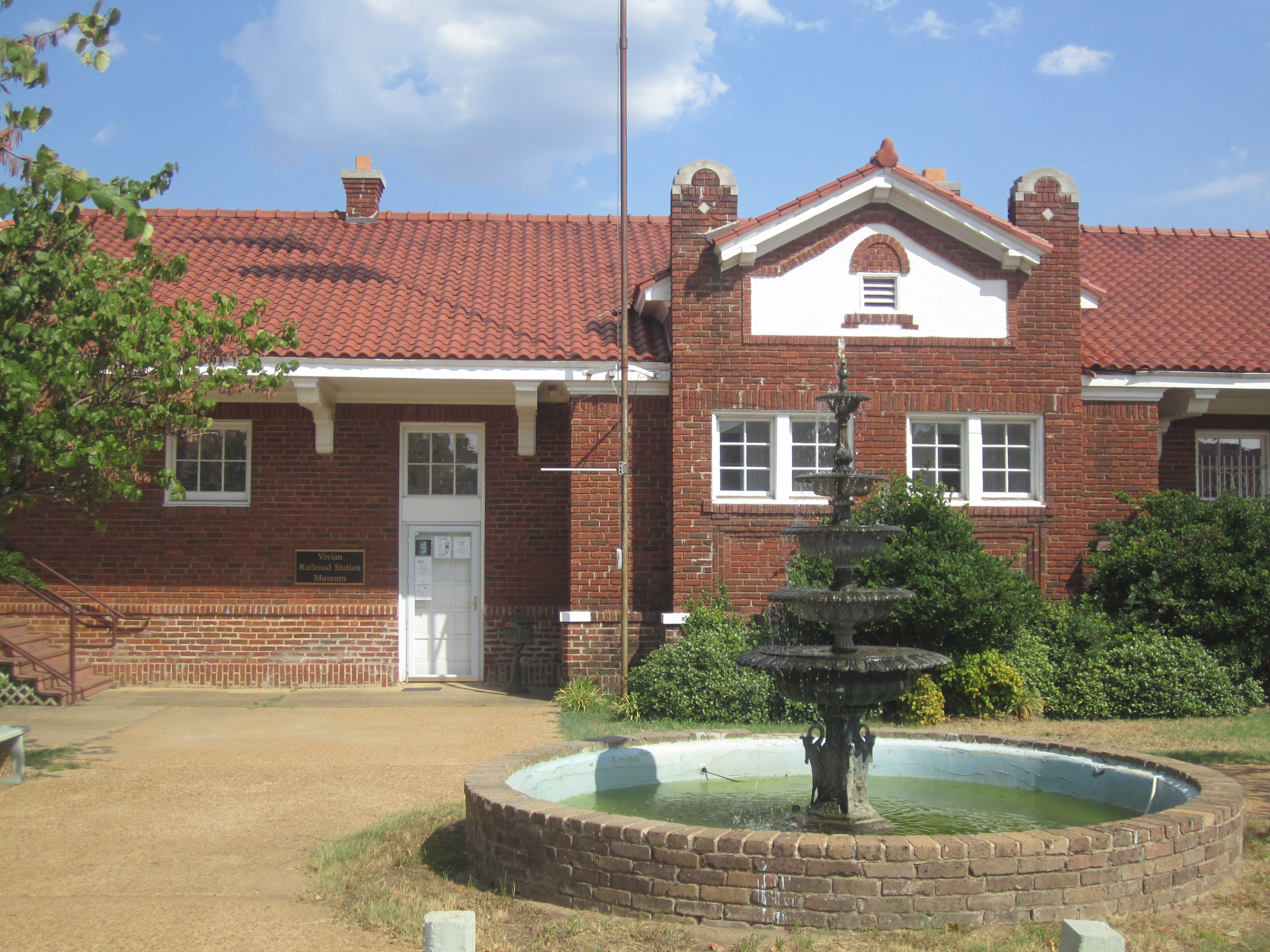
The Vivian Railroad Station Museum is located downtown.

=== 2020 census ===
As of the 2020 census, Vivian had a population of 3,073. The median age was 40.6 years. 23.8% of residents were under the age of 18 and 20.2% of residents were 65 years of age or older. For every 100 females there were 87.7 males, and for every 100 females age 18 and over there were 83.1 males age 18 and over.

0.0% of residents lived in urban areas, while 100.0% lived in rural areas.

There were 1,305 households in Vivian, of which 30.7% had children under the age of 18 living in them. Of all households, 30.1% were married-couple households, 22.4% were households with a male householder and no spouse or partner present, and 41.0% were households with a female householder and no spouse or partner present. About 35.4% of all households were made up of individuals and 17.2% had someone living alone who was 65 years of age or older. There were 1,523 housing units, of which 14.3% were vacant. The homeowner vacancy rate was 3.0% and the rental vacancy rate was 14.5%.

Vivian racial composition as of 2020
| Race | Number | Percentage |
|---|---|---|
| White (non-Hispanic) | 1,541 | 50.15% |
| Black or African American (non-Hispanic) | 1,288 | 41.91% |
| Native American | 14 | 0.46% |
| Asian | 28 | 0.91% |
| Other/Mixed | 142 | 4.62% |
| Hispanic or Latino | 60 | 1.95% |

=== 2000 census ===
As of the census of 2000, there were 4,031 people, 1,569 households, and 1,019 families residing in the town. The population density was 782.1 inhabitants per square mile (302.0/km^{2}). There were 1,812 housing units at an average density of 351.5 per square mile (135.7/km^{2}).

In 2000, the racial makeup of the town was 63.90% White, 34.19% African American, 0.52% Native American, 0.35% Asian, 0.02% from other races, and 1.02% from two or more races. Hispanic or Latino of any race were 0.72% of the population.

There were 1,569 households, out of which 32.3% had children under the age of 18 living with them, 42.2% were married couples living together, 19.4% had a female householder with no husband present, and 35.0% were non-families. 31.7% of all households were made up of individuals, and 17.0% had someone living alone who was 65 years of age or older. The average household size was 2.51 and the average family size was 3.16.

In the town, the population was spread out, with 29.9% under the age of 18, 8.4% from 18 to 24, 23.6% from 25 to 44, 19.9% from 45 to 64, and 18.2% who were 65 years of age or older. The median age was 36 years. For every 100 females, there were 81.7 males. For every 100 females age 18 and over, there were 74.9 males.

At the 2000 census, the median income for a household in the town was $23,800, and the median income for a family was $29,867. Males had a median income of $26,844 versus $17,500 for females. The per capita income for the town was $13,267. About 21.4% of families and 26.2% of the population were below the poverty line, including 42.0% of those under age 18 and 14.6% of those age 65 or over.

== Government ==
The current mayor is Ronnie Festavan.

== Media ==
Caddo Citizen is the newspaper. Radio stations broadcasting from Vivian include KNCB (AM) (1329) classic rock, and KNCB-FM (105.3) classic country.

== Education ==
It is in the Caddo Parish School District.

== Notable people ==
- Dan Flores, historian of the American West, born in Vivian in 1948
- Phil Robertson (1946–2025), inventor of Duck Commander Duck Calls and personality on Duck Dynasty
- Silas Robertson (born 1948), television personality
- Jasper Smith (1905–1992), Vivian lawyer, city attorney, and Louisiana House representative.
- Robert Williams III (1997― ), basketball player for the Portland Trail Blazers

== Filming location ==
Exterior shots of the supermarket in the film The Mist were shot in Vivian in 2007 at Tom's Market, and outdoor scenes for Straw Dogs (2011) were filmed in the downtown region in 2009.
