= KHDY-FM =

Radio station in Clarksville, Texas

- Clarksville, Texas; United States
- Broadcast area: Paris, Texas
- Frequency: 98.5 MHz
- Branding: Classic Rock 98-5

Programming
- Format: Classic rock
- Affiliations: John Boy and Billy

Ownership
- Owner: American Media Investments; (AMI Radio)
- Sister stations: KEWL, KPGG

History
- First air date: 1990 (as KCBZ)
- Former call signs: KCBZ (1988–1993); KGAP (1993–2018)
- Call sign meaning: HowDY 98.5 (previous branding)

Technical information
- Licensing authority: FCC
- Facility ID: 4045
- Class: C2
- ERP: 50,000 watts
- HAAT: 94 meters (308 ft)

Links
- Public license information: Public file; LMS

KHDY-FM (98.5 FM) is a radio station licensed to Clarksville, Texas. KHDY-FM is owned by American Media Investments and airs a classic rock music format.

On February 4, 2019, KHDY-FM rebranded as "98.5 & 103.9 The Pig", simulcasting KPGG 103.9 FM Ashdown, Arkansas.

On January 4, 2021, KHDY split from its simulcast of sister station KPGG and began airing its own separate programming again, flipping from classic country to classic rock as "Classic Rock 98-5".
