= KEWL-FM =

Radio station in New Boston, Texas

- New Boston, Texas; United States
- Broadcast area: Texarkana metropolitan area
- Frequency: 95.1 MHz
- Branding: 95.1 The River

Programming
- Format: Adult contemporary
- Affiliations: ABC Radio

Ownership
- Owner: American Media Investments Inc.
- Sister stations: KPGG-FM

History
- First air date: July 1995
- Former call signs: KBWE (1994–1995) (original FCC assignment but was never used)
- Call sign meaning: Alternate spelling for "Cool"

Technical information
- Licensing authority: FCC
- Facility ID: 38515
- Class: C3
- ERP: 25,000 watts
- HAAT: 99 meters (325 ft)
- Transmitter coordinates: 33°26′15.00″N 94°25′11.00″W

Links
- Public license information: Public file; LMS
- Website: amiradiogroup.com/95-1theriver/

KEWL-FM (95.1 FM) is a radio station broadcasting an adult contemporary format. Licensed to New Boston, Texas, United States, it serves the Texarkana metropolitan area. The station is currently owned by American Media Investments. Its studios are located on College Drive in Texarkana, Texas and its transmitter is in New Boston.

As of October 2010 radio personalities on KEWL-FM include Kelli O'Neil (KOOL Morning Chick), Jordan on middays, Michael B. (with jokes) on afternoons and Stoney to midnight on KOOL Nights. Fabienne Thrash is on Saturday afternoons, followed by Jordan. On Friday, September 4, 2020 over the Labor Day weekend, KEWL-FM changed their format to '90s and 2000s alternative branded as "The River 95.1". In April 2024, KEWL-FM flipped to soft adult contemporary.
