= KBEL (AM) =

- Idabel, Oklahoma; United States
- Frequency: 1240 kHz
- Branding: TALK 1240

Programming
- Format: News/Talk
- Affiliations: SRN News, Premiere, Citadel Broadcasting, Genesis Radio Network, Radio America, Talk Radio Network

Ownership
- Owner: Dave Smulyan; (KBEL Communications, LLC)
- Sister stations: KBEL-FM

History
- First air date: January 1, 1952
- Call sign meaning: IdaBEL (city of license; shared with FM sister station)

Technical information
- Licensing authority: FCC
- Facility ID: 14759
- Class: C
- Power: 1,000 watts unlimited
- Transmitter coordinates: 33°52′54″N 94°49′10″W

Links
- Public license information: Public file; LMS

KBEL (1240 AM) is a radio station broadcasting a news talk format. Licensed to Idabel, Oklahoma, United States, the station is currently owned by Dave Smulyan, through licensee KBEL Communications, LLC. and features programming from SRN Salem Radio Network, Premiere Networks, Citadel Broadcasting, Genesis Communications, Talk Radio Network, Radio America and several others.

== History ==
KBEL-AM was launched January 1, 1952 and was the first radio station in McCurtain County, Oklahoma.

On June 22, 1999, the station's license, along with that of its sister station KBEL-FM, was assigned by Harold E. Cochran to Box Broadcasting.

The licenses of both KBEL and KBEL-FM were assigned by Box Broadcasting to Rod Liechti's Brute Force Radio, LLC. The transaction was consummated on July 30, 2013, for no consideration. Brute Force Radio sold the stations to Dave Smulyan's KBEL Communications, LLC effective October 9, 2018 for $230,000.
