= KNCB-FM =

- Vivian, Louisiana; United States
- Broadcast area: North Caddo Parish
- Frequency: 105.3 MHz
- Branding: Caddo Country 105.3

Programming
- Language: English
- Format: Classic country

Ownership
- Owner: Cass County Radio
- Sister stations: KNCB

History
- Call sign meaning: K North Caddo Broadcasting Company (former owner)

Technical information
- Licensing authority: FCC
- Facility ID: 49155
- Class: A
- ERP: 3,200 watts
- HAAT: 137 meters (449 ft)
- Transmitter coordinates: 32.9317°N 93.9063°W

Links
- Public license information: Public file; LMS
- Webcast: Listen Live
- Website: Caddo Country 105.3

KNCB-FM (105.3 MHz, "Caddo Country 105.3") is an American radio station licensed to Vivian, Louisiana. The station broadcasting a Classic country format. The station is serving in the Shreveport-Bossier City metropolitan area. The station is owned by E Radio Network, LLC. The station studio and transmitter is located in North Vivian.

== History ==
KNCB-FM received its construction permit for 95.7 in 1990. The CP was extended multiple times in the 90s, with the station being moved to 105.3; it received its license to cover in 1997.

In 2012, the station was transferred to Gloria Dowd Herring and Ronald Dowd as co-administrators of Collins's estate. During this time, the KNCB stations encountered serious financial problems and temporarily went silent in order to avoid incurring further losses. In 2014, the KNCB stations were sold to MLS Broadcasting, a business of the Delgiorno family.

Previous logo

On January 27, 2026, KNCB-FM reverted its format from country to classic country, restored branding as "Caddo Country 105.3".
