= KNCB (AM) =

- Vivian, Louisiana; United States
- Broadcast area: Shreveport, Louisiana
- Frequency: 1320 kHz
- Branding: ESPN Shreveport

Programming
- Format: Sports
- Affiliations: ESPN Radio

Ownership
- Owner: E Radio Network, LLC
- Sister stations: KNCB-FM

History
- First air date: May 31, 1966
- Call sign meaning: Former owner North Caddo Broadcasting

Technical information
- Licensing authority: FCC
- Facility ID: 49154
- Class: D
- Power: 5,000 watts (day); 57 watts (night)
- Transmitter coordinates: 32°54′7″N 93°58′58″W
- Translator: 104.1 K281CY (Vivian)

Links
- Public license information: Public file; LMS

KNCB (1320 kHz) is an American radio station licensed to Vivian, Louisiana. The station broadcasting an Sports format. KNCB is owned by E Radio Network, LLC. It is the Shreveport-Texarkana radio home of the Texas Rangers. The station studio and transmitter is located in North Vivian.

== History ==
KNCB was first licensed in 1966, to Alvis Dowd. The station originally operated on 1600 kHz. Upon his death, his widow Ruby June Stinnett Dowd (later Collins), operating as North Caddo Broadcasting, took over the station.

In 1976, KNCB moved to 1320 after trying in the early 1970s to move to 1300.

In 2012, the station was transferred to Gloria Dowd Herring and Ronald Dowd as co-administrators of Collins's estate. During this time, the KNCB stations encountered serious financial problems and requested to operate only on Sundays from 6a.m. to 6p.m. In 2014, the KNCB stations were sold to MLS Broadcasting, a business of the Delgiorno family.

On February 1, 2016, KNCB changed their format from sports to classic hits. (info taken from stationintel.com)

Previous logo
