= KBEL-FM =

- Idabel, Oklahoma; United States
- Frequency: 96.7 MHz
- Branding: KBEL 96.7 FM

Programming
- Format: Country music
- Affiliations: Oklahoma News Network

Ownership
- Owner: Dave Smulyan; (KBEL Communications, LLC)
- Sister stations: KBEL

History
- First air date: 1974 (as KWDG)
- Former call signs: KWDG (1974–1990); KBEL-FM (1990–Present)
- Call sign meaning: K IdaBEL (city of license; shared with AM sister station)

Technical information
- Licensing authority: FCC
- Facility ID: 14758
- Class: C3
- ERP: 25,000 watts
- HAAT: 91 meters (299 ft)
- Transmitter coordinates: 33°52′54″N 94°49′10″W

Links
- Public license information: Public file; LMS
- Webcast: Listen Live
- Website: Official website

KBEL-FM (96.7 FM, is a terrestrial American radio station broadcasting a country music format. Licensed to Idabel, Oklahoma, United States, the station is currently owned by Dave Smulyan through licensee KBEL Communications, LLC and features programming from Westwood One and the Oklahoma News Network.

== History ==
KBEL-FM was originally a 3,000 watt ERP monoaural FM station taking to the airwaves in 1974. The Idabel stations were originally sister stations of radio stations in Mount Pleasant, Texas which is about 85 miles south of Idabel, Oklahoma.

The station changed its call sign on December 12, 1990, from KWDG then a rock station to KBEL-FM to program country music by the new owner Curt Cochran. On June 22, 1999, then-owner Harold E. Cochran assigned the station's license, along with that of its sister station KBEL, to Box Broadcasting.

The licenses of both KBEL-FM and KBEL were assigned by Box Broadcasting to Rod Liechti's Brute Force Radio; the transaction was consummated on July 30, 2013. Brute Force Radio sold the stations to current owner Dave Smulyan of KBEL Communications, LLC effective October 9, 2018 for $230,000.
