= KTFS-FM =

Radio station in Texarkana, Arkansas

- Texarkana, Arkansas; United States
- Broadcast area: Texarkana metropolitan area
- Frequency: 107.1 MHz (HD Radio)
- Branding: The Patriot 107.1

Programming
- Format: Conservative talk radio
- Subchannels: HD2: KTTY simulcast (Classic hits); HD3: Real Country 98.7 (Classic country)

Ownership
- Owner: Cliff Dumas; (BTC USA Holdings Management Inc.)
- Sister stations: KBYB, KCMC, KTFS, KTOY, KTTY

History
- First air date: June 11, 1968; 57 years ago
- Former call signs: KADO-FM (1968–1984); KTWN (1984–1989); KTWN-FM (1989–April 2000); KQIX (April–October 2000); KFYX (October 2000–2011)

Technical information
- Licensing authority: FCC
- Facility ID: 33541
- Class: A
- ERP: 2,900 watts
- HAAT: 146 meters (479 ft)
- Transmitter coordinates: 33°25′45.4″N 94°7′11.6″W
- Translator: See § Translators

Links
- Public license information: Public file; LMS
- Webcast: Listen Live; Listen Live (HD3)
- Website: ktfsradio.com realcountryfm.com (HD3)

KTFS-FM (107.1 MHz) is a radio station broadcasting a conservative talk radio format. Licensed to Texarkana, Arkansas, United States, it serves the Texarkana metropolitan area. The station is currently owned by Bryan Woodruff, Ted Ellis and Cliff Dumas, through BTC USA Holdings Management Inc. Its studios are located on Olive in Texarkana, Texas just one block west of the Texas–Arkansas state line and its transmitter is in Wake Village, Texas.

== History ==
On October 6, 2005, KFYX changed its format from country to CHR as "The Fix".

On January 3, 2011, KFYX changed its format from CHR to talk, branded as "Talk Radio 107.1" and changed its call sign to KTFS-FM.

On January 15, 2015, KTFS-FM changed its format from talk to CHR, branded as "107.1 The Fox".

Former logo

On January 22, 2019, KTFS-FM changed its format from CHR (which moved to KTFS-HD3 and shifted format to hot AC) to conservative talk (which moved from KTFS (AM) 940 AM Texarkana).

== HD Radio ==
- HD1 is a digital simulcast of analog (traditional FM) signal.
- HD2 is a digital simulcast of "Hits 105".

== Translators ==
Call sign	Frequency	City of license	FID	ERP (W)	HAAT	Class	Transmitter coordinates	FCC info	Notes
K254AS	98.7 FM	Texarkana, Texas	150918	220	104 m (341 ft)	D	33°25′45.4″N 94°7′11.7″W	LMS	Relays HD3
K288FI	105.5 FM	Texarkana, Texas	156973	250	89.5 m (294 ft)	D	33°25′45.4″N 94°7′11.7″W	LMS	Relays HD2
