= KCMC (AM) =

Radio station in Texarkana, Texas

- Texarkana, Texas; United States
- Broadcast area: Texarkana metropolitan area
- Frequency: 740 kHz
- Branding: 107.9 The Fan

Programming
- Format: Sports radio
- Affiliations: Infinity Sports Network

Ownership
- Owner: Cliff Dumas; (BTC USA Holdings Management Inc.)
- Sister stations: KBYB, KTFS, KTFS-FM, KTOY, KTTY

History
- First air date: 1930; 96 years ago
- Former call signs: WQDV (1930); WDIX (1930–1932); KCMC (1932–2014); KTFS (2014–2017)

Technical information
- Licensing authority: FCC
- Facility ID: 33729
- Class: D
- Power: 680 watts (day); 68 watts (night)
- Transmitter coordinates: 33°24′30.00″N 94°2′47.00″W
- Translator: 107.9 K300DW (Texarkana)

Links
- Public license information: Public file; LMS
- Webcast: Listen live
- Website: www.thefan1079.com

KCMC (740 kHz) is an AM radio station licensed to Texarkana, Texas, United States. It serves the Texarkana metropolitan area. The station is currently owned by Cliff Dumas, through licensee BTC USA Holdings Management Inc. Studios are located on Olive Street, just west of the border with Arkansas. The station is an affiliate of the Dallas Cowboys radio network.

The transmitter site is on De Loach Street in the Texarkana city limits also west of the Arkansas border. 740 AM is a Canadian clear-channel frequency, on which CFZM in Toronto, Ontario is the dominant Class A station. KCMC must reduce power during nighttime hours in order to protect the nighttime skywave signal of CFZM.

== History ==
The station was first authorized in 1930 as WQDV in Tupelo, Mississippi. Later that year, the call sign was changed to WDIX. In early 1932, the call sign was changed to KCMC. Clyde E. Palmer purchased the station as a sister outlet to his Texarkana Gazette newspaper. It was Texarkana, Arkansas' first radio station. KCMC operated on 1420 kHz with 100 watts of power.

Disk jockey Barney Cannon (1955–2009), an authority on Country music who spent a quarter century with KWKH in Shreveport, once worked at KCMC.

On January 15, 2015, the then-KTFS changed formats to talk, branded as "Talk Radio 740".

On July 1, 2017, KTFS went silent. On November 28, 2017, KTFS's call sign was changed back to KCMC. A news release on the KTOY website said that KCMC could return to the air from a new facility at some time in the future.

On January 22, 2019, KCMC returned to the air with conservative talk, simulcasting KTFS-FM 107.1 Texarkana, AR.

Previous logo before network rebranding

In mid-October 2019, KCMC dropped its simulcast with KTFS-FM and changed its format to sports, branded as "107.9 The Fan".

== Translator ==
Broadcast translator for KCMC
Call sign	Frequency	City of license	FID	ERP (W)	HAAT	Class	Transmitter coordinates	FCC info
K300DW	107.9 FM	Texarkana, Texas	202065	230	99 m (325 ft)	D	33°25′45.4″N 94°7′11.7″W	LMS
