= KHDY (AM) =

- Clarksville, Texas; United States
- Broadcast area: Paris, Texas
- Frequency: 1350 kHz
- Branding: K-Car

Programming
- Format: Classic Country
- Affiliations: Jones Radio Network

Ownership
- Owner: American Media Investments Inc.

History
- Former call signs: KCAR (?-2018)

Technical information
- Licensing authority: FCC
- Facility ID: 4046
- Class: D
- Power: 410 watts (day); 65 watts (night)
- Transmitter coordinates: 33°36′47″N 95°01′03″W

Links
- Public license information: Public file; LMS

KHDY (1350 AM) is a radio station broadcasting a Classic Country music format. Licensed to Clarksville, Texas, United States, the station serves the Paris, Texas, area. The station is owned by American Media Investments and features programming from Jones Radio Network.
