= KZHN =

Radio station in Paris, Texas

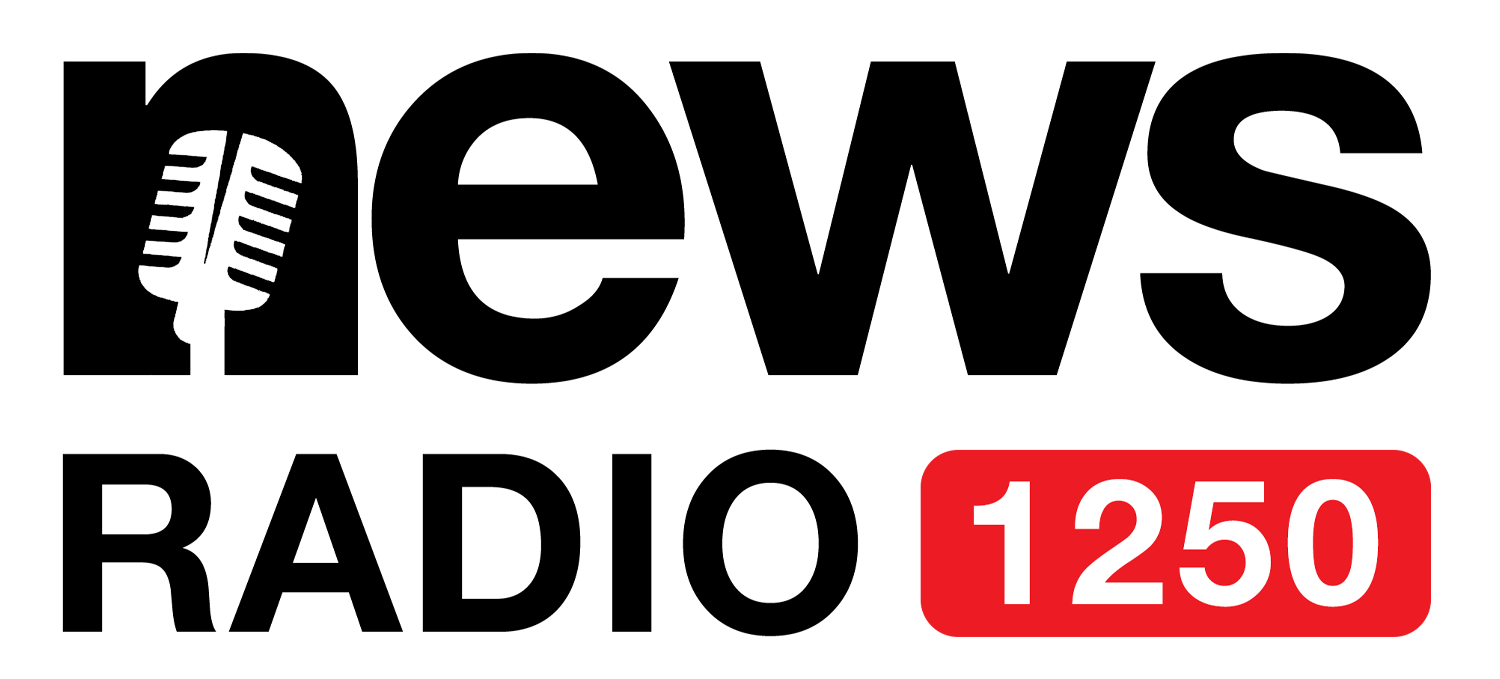
- Paris, Texas; United States
- Frequency: 1250 kHz
- Branding: "News Radio 1250"

Programming
- Format: News/Talk

Ownership
- Owner: Eifel Tower Broadcasting

History
- First air date: 1950
- Former call signs: KPRE (1950–1990); KGDD (1990–1999); KPJC (1999–2005)

Technical information
- Licensing authority: FCC
- Facility ID: 71406
- Class: D
- Power: 500 watts day 95 watts night
- Transmitter coordinates: 33°43′21.00″N 95°32′50.00″W

Links
- Public license information: Public file; LMS
- Website: www.newsradio1250.com

KZHN (1250 AM) is a radio station broadcasting a news/talk radio format. Licensed to Paris, Texas, United States, the station serves the Paris area. The station is currently owned by Larry Ryan D/B/a Eifel Tower Broadcasting.

== History ==
The station went on the air in 1950 as KFTV, and in the late 50s as KPRE through the 80s and later as KGDD on March 1, 1990. On October 1, 1999, the station changed its call sign to KPJC. On October 19, 2005, the station changed its call sign to the current KZHN.
