= KPLT (AM) =

Radio station in Paris, Texas

- Paris, Texas; United States
- Frequency: 1490 kHz
- Branding: The Legend

Programming
- Format: Classic country
- Affiliations: Fox News Radio

Ownership
- Owner: East Texas Broadcasting, Inc.
- Sister stations: KALK, KBUS, KPLT-FM, KSCH

History
- First air date: December 15, 1936

Technical information
- Licensing authority: FCC
- Facility ID: 35483
- Class: C
- Power: 1,000 watts unlimited
- Transmitter coordinates: 33°38′7.00″N 95°33′14.00″W
- Translator: 96.3 K242BC (Paris)

Links
- Public license information: Public file; LMS
- Website: easttexasradio.com/stations/kplt/

KPLT (1490 kHz) is an AM radio station broadcasting a classic country format. Licensed to Paris, Texas, United States, the station serves the Paris area. The station is currently owned by East Texas Broadcasting, Inc. and features programming from Fox News Radio. KPLT simulcasts with translator K242BC on 96.3 FM.

Former logo

== Programming ==
The Talk of Paris hosted by Jerry Anderson broadcasts weekday mornings. All other day-parts feature programming from Westwood One.
