= KPLT-FM =

Radio station in Paris, Texas

- Paris, Texas; United States
- Frequency: 107.7 MHz

Programming
- Format: Hot adult contemporary
- Affiliations: ABC Radio

Ownership
- Owner: East Texas Broadcasting, Inc.
- Sister stations: KALK, KBUS, KPLT, KSCH

History
- First air date: 1966; 60 years ago
- Former call signs: KPLT (1966–1977); KACW (1977–1980); KTXU (1980–1990)

Technical information
- Licensing authority: FCC
- Facility ID: 35484
- Class: C2
- ERP: 50,000 watts
- HAAT: 150.0 meters
- Transmitter coordinates: 33°44′55.00″N 95°24′53.00″W

Links
- Public license information: Public file; LMS
- Webcast: [1]
- Website: easttexasradio.com/stations/mix-107-7/

KPLT-FM (107.7 FM) is a radio station broadcasting a hot adult contemporary format. Licensed to Paris, Texas, United States, the station serves the Paris area. The station is currently owned by East Texas Broadcasting, Inc.

Morning Drive host is Tim Howard in the Morning. Originally an adult contemporary station, it featured day-parts programming from Westwood One until it made the transition to Top 40 in 2016 and now currently is a hot adult contemporary format.

== History ==
The station went on the air as its original KPLT call-letters in 1966. When it signed on, the station began broadcasting on 99.3 FM. Its call-letters changed to KACW in 1977 as a country formatted station. On June 30, 1980, its call-letters and music format was changed to KTXU as an AOR format and was known to be the first radio station in the Paris area to broadcast in stereo, branded as "99 FM". During its earlier years, KTXU is the main station for the Paris Wildcats high-school team. KTXU is also a sister-station to its longtime AM station KPLT. In 1986, KTXU became an adult contemporary formatted station, while its sister-station KPLT-AM continued running a classical music format station including some selected local Paris area high-school games.

On July 17, 1988, KTXU reverted to its original country format simply nicknamed "The Texas Sound". In January 1989, the station moved to its current 107.7 FM frequency. On March 1, 1990, the station changed its call sign back to the former and now current KPLT-FM and its sister AM station changed its format to an adult contemporary format station.

KPLT-FM remains its country format until 1995, when KPLT changed its branding as "Star 107.7" and changed back to its adult contemporary format station. Until 2016, its branding changed to its current "Mix 107.7" branding and changes to mainstream top-40 format. Then sometime in 2024, it changed to a hot adult contemporary format.

Former logo.
