= KTFS (AM) =

Radio station in Texarkana, Texas

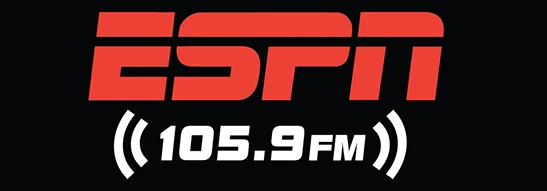
- Texarkana, Texas; United States
- Broadcast area: Texarkana metropolitan area
- Frequency: 940 kHz
- Branding: ESPN 105.9

Programming
- Format: Sports radio
- Affiliations: ESPN Radio

Ownership
- Owner: Cliff Dumas; (BTC USA Holdings Management Inc.)
- Sister stations: KBYB; KCMC; KTFS-FM; KTOY; KTTY

History
- First air date: 1961; 65 years ago
- Former call signs: KADO (1961–1989); KTWN (1989–1996); KTFS (1996–2014); KCMC (2014–2017)

Technical information
- Licensing authority: FCC
- Facility ID: 33542
- Class: D
- Power: 2,500 watts (day); 11 watts (night)
- Transmitter coordinates: 33°24′28.00″N 94°2′45.00″W
- Translator: 105.9 K290CP (Texarkana)

Links
- Public license information: Public file; LMS
- Webcast: Listen live
- Website: localfirstmediagroup.com

KTFS (940 AM) is a radio station broadcasting a sports radio format. Licensed to Texarkana, Texas, United States, it serves the Texarkana metropolitan area. The station is currently owned by Cliff Dumas, through licensee BTC USA Holdings Management Inc.

The studios are located on Olive in Texarkana, just one block west of the Texas–Arkansas state line, and its transmitter is on South State Line Avenue. KTFS broadcasts at a power of 2,500 watts during the day, and 11 watts during the night. This makes KTFS a class D radio station.

== History ==
KTFS was operated from a broadcast facility located on State Line Avenue on the Texarkana, Texas side. During that time the station operated with 250 watts, increasing power to 1,000 watts in 1967. Dave Hall was the News Director and broke the 'Fouke Monster' story, in Fouke, on a Sunday morning via a mobile car phone.

In December 2011, KTFS was taken off the air after vandals committed Vandalism at its broadcasting tower. The station filed for Special Temporary Authority to Remain Silent with the FCC on January 9, 2012, which they honored shortly afterward. However, on December 20, 2012, KTFS returned to the air with a News/Talk format, just two days before the station's license was set to expire. On April 19, 2013, KTFS changed formats to classic hits, simulcasting KTTY. The station's call sign was changed to KCMC on March 21, 2014. KCMC then reverted to the talk format on July 1, 2017, and reverted call signs on November 28.

On January 22, 2019, KTFS changed its format from talk to gospel, branded as "KTOY Gospel 105.9" (simulcast on FM translator K290CP 105.9 FM Texarkana). In 2022, a deal was reached that a Cliff Dumas led group would acquire Frontier Media. In 2023, Local First Media Group, the new name for the owner, acquired KTFS and on November 5, KTFS became Christmas 105.9. On January 4, 2024, KTFS changed its format to sports, branded as "ESPN 105.9", with programming from ESPN Radio.

== Translator ==
Broadcast translator for KTFS
Call sign	Frequency	City of license	FID	ERP (W)	HAAT	Class	Transmitter coordinates	FCC info
K290CP	105.9 FM	Texarkana, Texas	201334	114	48 m (157 ft)	D	33°24′30.4″N 94°2′47.6″W	LMS
