= KSCH =

Radio station in Sulphur Springs, Texas

KSCH and KSCN

KSCH: Sulphur Springs, Texas; KSCN: Pittsburg, Texas; United States
- Broadcast area: Paris, Texas; Mount Pleasant, Texas
- Frequencies: KSCH: 95.9 MHz; KSCN: 96.9 MHz
- Branding: Star Country 95.9 / 96.9

Programming
- Format: Country

Ownership
- Owner: East Texas Broadcasting, Inc.
- Sister stations: KALK, KBUS, KPLT, KPLT-FM

History
- First air date: KSCH: January 23, 1985; KSCN: October 30, 2001
- Former call signs: KSCH: KDXE (1982–1999)

Technical information
- Licensing authority: FCC
- Facility ID: KSCH: 24176; KSCN: 81812
- Class: KSCH: A; KSCN: C3
- ERP: KSCH: 6,000 watts; KSCN: 14,000 watts
- HAAT: KSCH: 87.0 meters (285.4 ft); KSCN: 113.0 meters (370.7 ft)
- Transmitter coordinates: KSCH: 33°9′7.00″N 95°36′12.00″W; KSCN: 33°0′31.00″N 95°4′14.00″W

Links
- Public license information: KSCH: Public file; LMS; KSCN: Public file; LMS
- Webcast: KSCH: Listen live KSCN: Listen live
- Website: Star Country 95.9; Star Country 96.9

KSCH (95.9 FM) and KSCN (96.9 FM) are co-owned and operated radio stations broadcasting a country music format. Licensed to Sulphur Springs and Pittsburg, Texas, respectively, the stations serve Sulphur Springs, Winnsboro, and Mount Pleasant, Texas. The stations are currently owned by East Texas Broadcasting, Inc.

== History ==
The Sulphur Springs license was assigned the call letters KDXE on August 17, 1982. On February 1, 1999, the facility changed its call sign to the current KSCH, corresponding with the assignment of the KSCN calls to the new Pittsburg licensed construction permit for 96.9 MHz.

== Current ==
The station motto of "Today's hits, yesterday's favorites, Star 95.9, 96.9" can be heard many times during the day when listening to KSCH.

Some interactive games are played during the day, such as "Name That TV Theme", and the "Whataburger Song of the Day". Some games are only played on a monthly or weekly basis, such as "Mad Dash for Christmas Cash", "Get Away and Play", and "Live Free For a Month".

On weekdays, J.T. Justice hosts the "Swap Shop", in which listeners sell their used merchandise. The program begins at 8 AM, and continues until they run out of ads.

On Saturday mornings from 8-9 AM, the station airs a NASCAR talk show, which broadcasts from the Texas track.
