= Shreveport–Bossier City metropolitan area =

Shreveport–Bossier City
- Metropolitan statistical area
- Shreveport–Bossier City, LA metropolitan statistical area
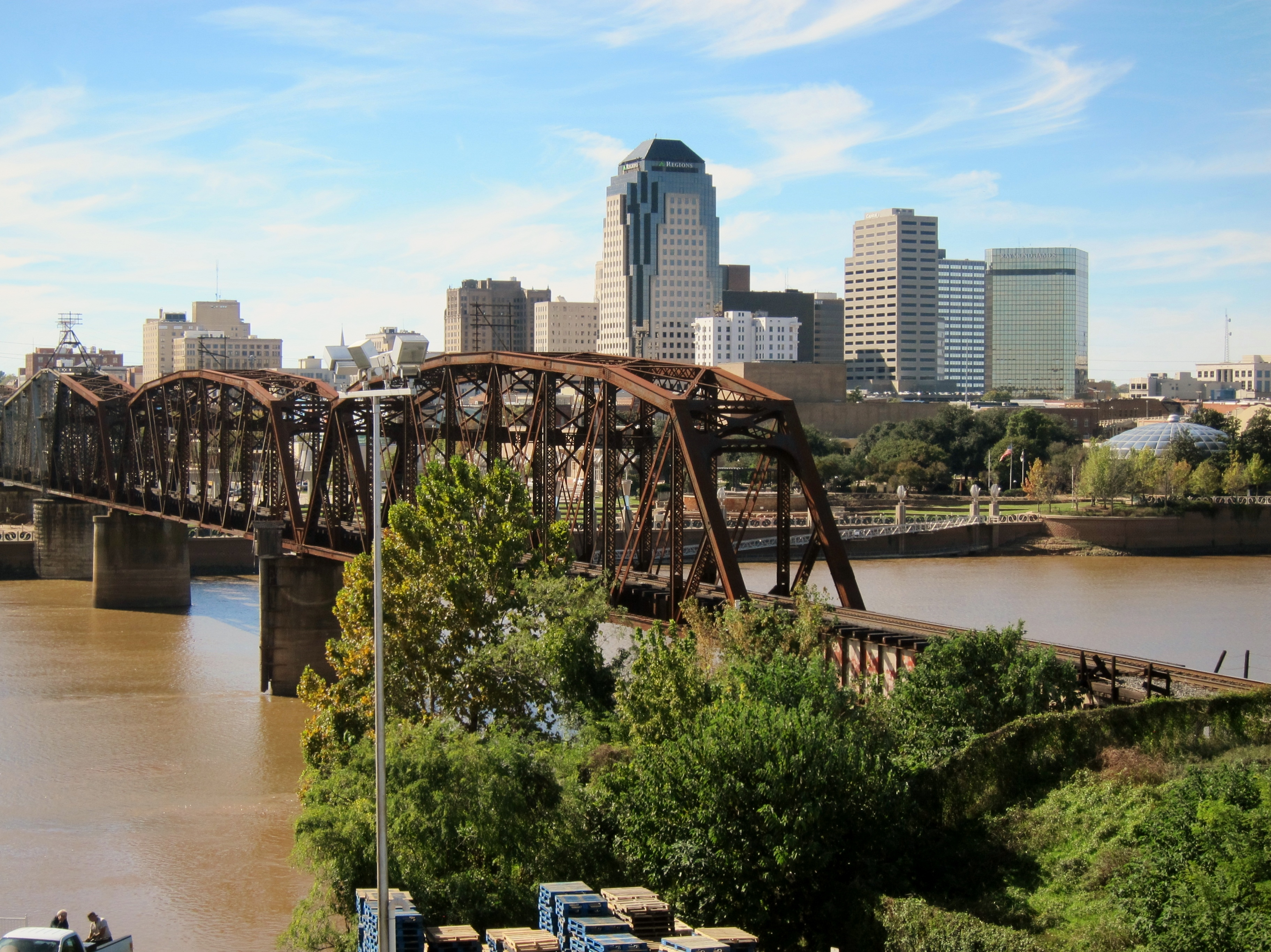
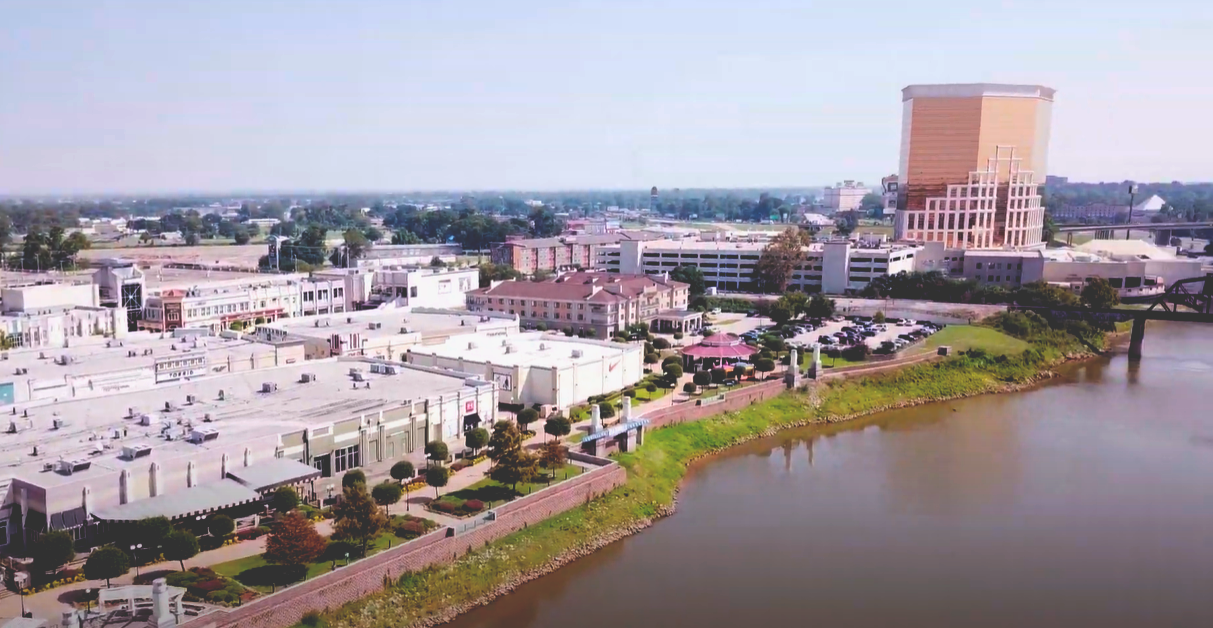
- From top to bottom: Shreveport, Bossier City
Map of Shreveport–Bossier City–Minden, LA CSA
City of Shreveport
Bossier City
Shreveport–Bossier City, LA MSA
Minden, LA µSA
- Country: United States
- State: Louisiana
- Principal communities: List: Shreveport; Bossier City; Greenwood; Mansfield

Area
  - Metro: 2,699 sq mi (6,990 km^{2})

Population (2020)
  - MSA: 393,406 (140th)

GDP
  - Metro: $27.363 billion (2022)
- Time zone: UTC-6 (CST)
  - Summer (DST): UTC-5 (CDT)

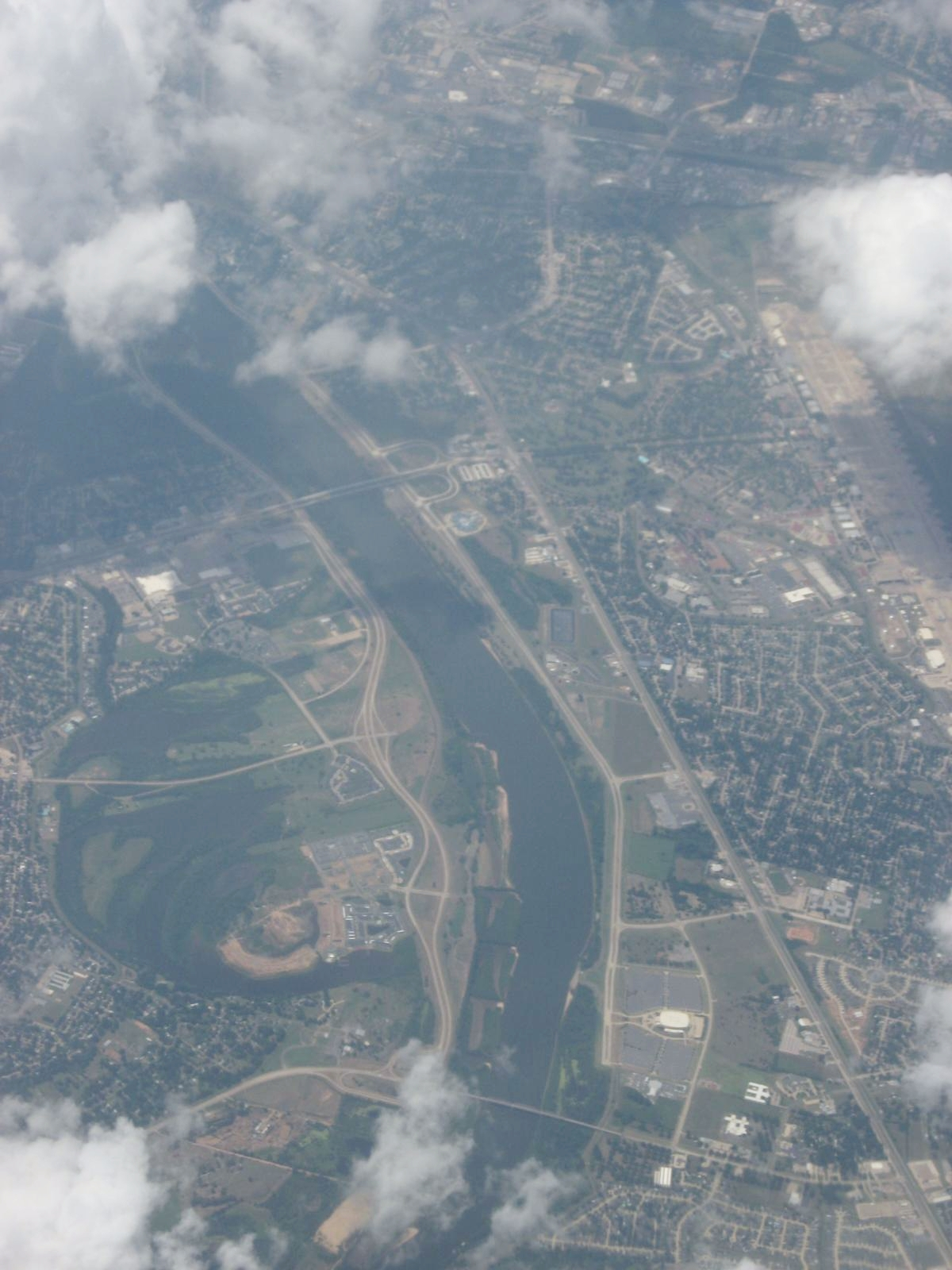
The Red River between Shreveport and Bossier City

The Shreveport–Bossier City metropolitan area, officially designated Shreveport–Bossier City by the U.S. Office of Management and Budget, or simply Greater Shreveport, is a metropolitan statistical area in northwestern Louisiana that covers three parishes: Caddo, Bossier, and DeSoto. At the 2020 United States census, the metropolitan region had a population of 393,406; its American Community Survey population was 397,590 per census estimates. With a 2010 census population of 439,000, it declined to become Louisiana's fourth largest metropolis at 394,706 residents at the 2019 census estimates.

Shreveport–Bossier City is the largest economic and cultural center of North Louisiana and the wider Ark-La-Tex region. The Shreveport–Bossier City metropolitan region comprises the highest concentration of colleges and universities in the Ark-La-Tex. It is part of the I-20 Cyber Corridor linking the area to Ruston, Grambling, and Monroe, Louisiana; Dallas and Tyler, Texas; and Atlanta, Georgia.

Shreveport–Bossier City's metropolitan economy is primarily based on oil and natural gas, manufacturing, casinos, restaurants, commerce, telecommunications, technology, banking, healthcare and medical research, and advertising. The largest companies operating within the metropolitan statistical area are Amazon, Calumet Specialty Products Partners, SWEPCO, AT&T Mobility and Cricket Wireless, Louisiana State University, JPMorgan Chase, Comcast, Regions Financial Corporation, Brookshire Grocery Company, and Walmart. The metropolis is one of the most religious in the United States, Shreveport being one of the top 5 most religious cities in the United States in 2016.

== Geography ==
The Shreveport–Bossier City metropolitan area has a total area a little over 2,699 square miles. The area is slightly larger than the U.S. state of Delaware, and smaller than Connecticut and the U.S. territory of Puerto Rico. The U.S. Office of Management and Budget defines the metropolitan region as covering Caddo, Bossier, and DeSoto parishes. Previously, Webster Parish was considered part of Greater Shreveport; it is now part of the Shreveport–Bossier City–Minden combined statistical area. Communities of the metropolis sit at elevations over 100 feet above sea level making them primary locations for coastal retreat due to rising sea levels.

The Shreveport–Bossier City area is located in the South Central United States, bordering East Texas and South Arkansas. As such, it is within the Piney Woods ecoregion. Its vegetation is classified as temperate forest and grassland. Much of the urbanized area was built on forested land, marshes, swamp, or prairie, remnants of which can still be seen throughout the metropolitan region.

== Communities ==
=== Cities ===
- Shreveport (Principal city)
- Bossier City (Principal city)
- Mansfield (Principal city)

=== Towns ===
- Benton
- Blanchard (suburb)
- Greenwood (suburb)
- Haughton (suburb)
- Keachi
- Logansport
- Oil City
- Plain Dealing
- Stonewall (suburb)
- Vivian
- Mooringsport

=== Villages ===
- Belcher
- Gilliam
- Grand Cane
- Hosston
- Ida
- Longstreet
- Rodessa
- South Mansfield
- Stanley

=== Unincorporated areas ===
==== Census-designated places ====
- Eastwood
- Frierson
- Gloster
- Lakeview
- Red Chute

==== Other communities ====
- Keithville
- Kingston

== Demographics ==
Historical population
Census	Pop.	Note	%±
1850	23,869		—
1860	36,786		54.1%
1870	49,351		34.2%
1880	57,941		17.4%
1890	71,745		23.8%
1900	93,715		30.6%
1910	107,627		14.8%
1920	134,907		25.3%
1930	184,074		36.4%
1940	215,168		16.9%
1950	241,084		12.0%
1960	305,729		26.8%
1970	317,467		3.8%
1980	358,609		13.0%
1990	359,687		0.3%
2000	375,965		4.5%
2010	398,604		6.0%
2020	393,406		−1.3%
U.S. Decennial Census; 1790–1960 1900–1990; 1990–2000 2010–2016

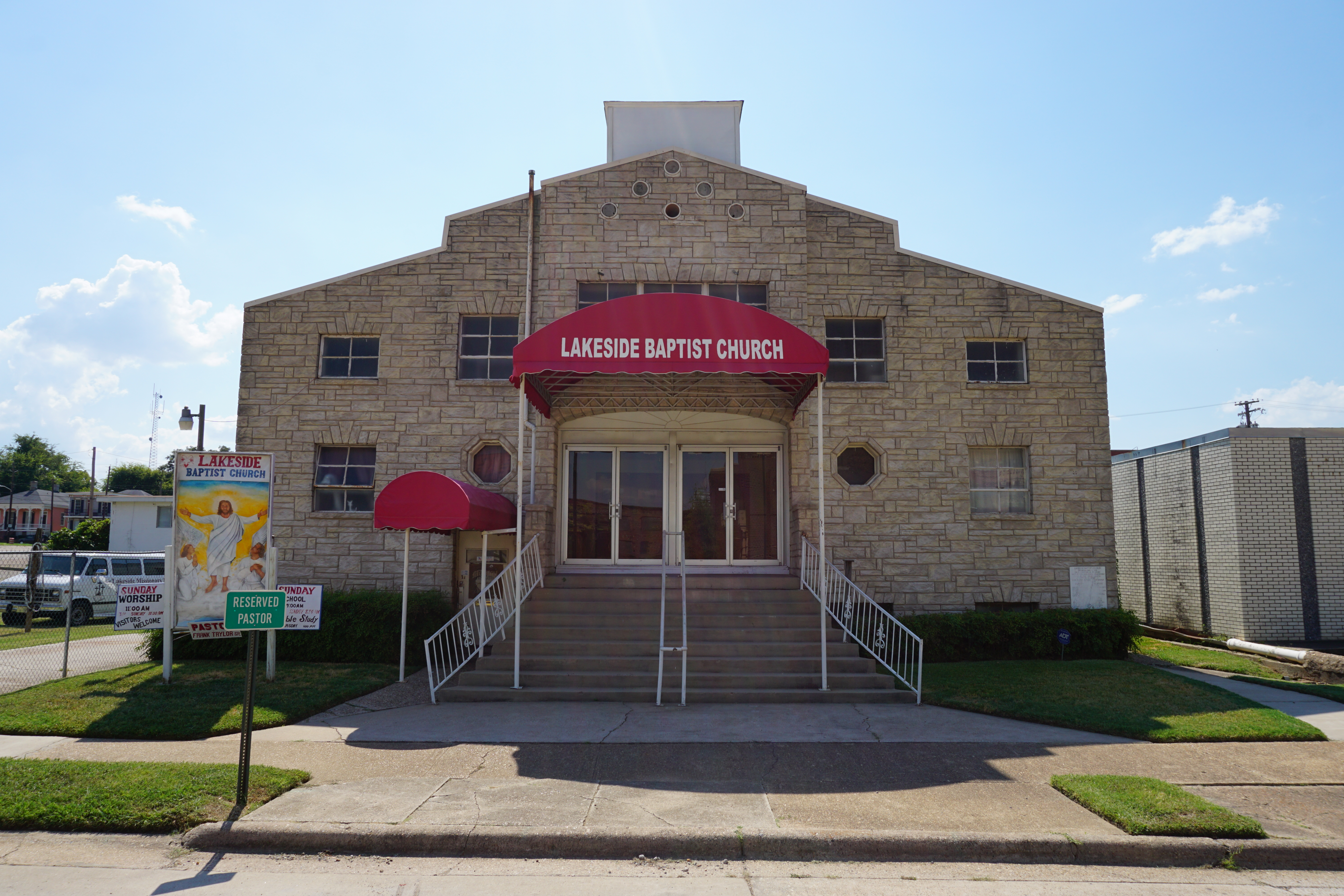
Lakeside Baptist Church in downtown Shreveport, a historic African-American congregation

At the 2010 United States census, there were 557,201 people, 189,000 households, and 139,000 families residing within the metropolitan statistical area; in 2020, the United States census determined it had a population of 393,406. The American Community Survey's 2020 census estimates postulated a rebound of 397,590.

According to census estimates from 2015 to 2020, approximately 156,594 households were in the metropolitan area with an average of 2.5 people per household; 46% of the household were married, and spread among 184,148 housing units of which 85% were occupied. Of the housing units, 63% were owner-occupied and 71% were single-unit detached homes at a median value of $156,900. Residents in the metropolitan statistical area had a median household income of $46,610 and 20.9% of its population lived at or below the poverty line.

According to the 2020 census, the racial and ethnic makeup of Shreveport–Bossier City was 35.6% White, 57.9% African American, 0.1% Native American, 1.88% Asian, 1.4% Pacific Islander, 0.1% from other races, 0.1% from two or more races, and 1.4% Hispanic or Latino of any heritage 3.4%.This demographic makes White citizens the minority group in Shreveport Louisiana. Females make up 54% of the population in Shreveport whereas males only make up 46% of the Shreveport population. This information is all according to the United States Census Bureau.

In 2020 according to Sperling's BestPlaces, roughly 63.5% of Shreveport–Bossier City was religious. According to the Association of Religion Data Archives in 2020, it remained one of the most Christian areas of the United States. Per Sperling's, the largest religion in the metropolitan statistical area is Christianity, followed by Islam, Judaism, and eastern religions including Buddhism, Sikhism, and Hinduism. There is also a growing spiritual but not religious community.

Among Christians, Baptists, Methodists, and Catholics form the largest communities in the metropolitan area. A 2014 study determined the leading Baptist denomination was the Southern Baptist Convention. The United Methodist Church was the largest Methodist body and the Roman Catholic Diocese of Shreveport was the primary Catholic jurisdiction. The same study also named Islam the second-largest religion in the area, with Shreveporter Muslims making up about 14% of Louisiana's total Muslim-affiliated population. In a separate study by the Association of Religion Data Archives for 2020, the Southern Baptists had 111,745 members spread throughout 151 churches in the area; and the United Methodists had 19,114 members in 46 churches. Historically African American Christian denominations including the National Baptist Convention, National Baptist Convention of America, and National Missionary Baptist Convention had 32,132 members altogether.

Parish	Seat	2025 estimate	2020 census	Change	Area	Density
Caddo	Shreveport	224,226	237,848	−5.73%	451 sq mi (1,170 km^{2})	239/sq mi (92/km^{2})
Bossier	Benton	131,867	128,746	+2.42%	468 sq mi (1,210 km^{2})	152/sq mi (59/km^{2})
DeSoto	Mansfield	27,381	26,812	+2.12%	826 sq mi (2,140 km^{2})	31/sq mi (12/km^{2})
Total		383,474	393,406	−2.52%	2,314 sq mi (5,990 km^{2})	142/sq mi (55/km^{2})

== Economy ==
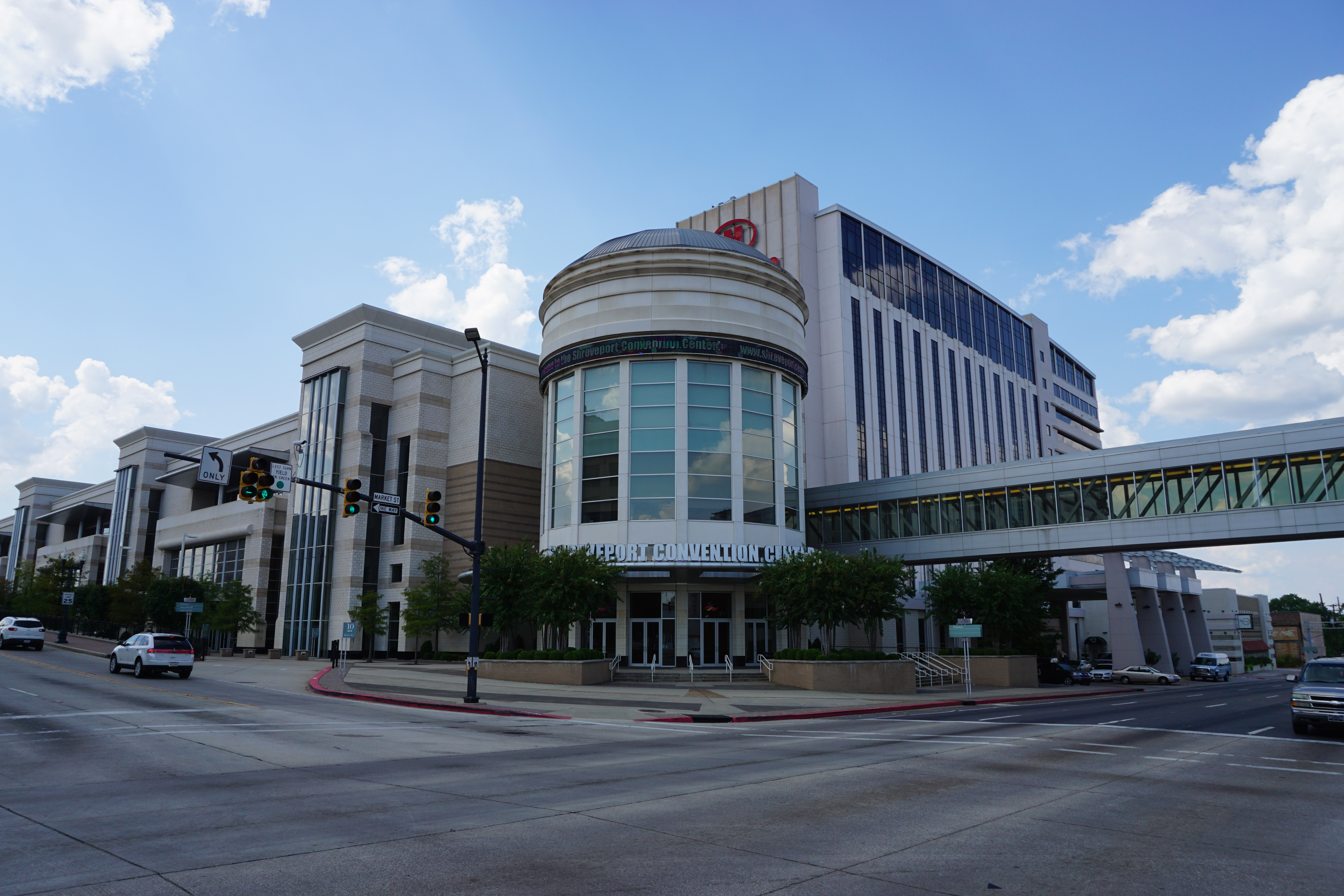
Shreveport Convention Center

Shreveport–Bossier City is the economic and cultural center of Northwest Louisiana and the wider Ark-La-Tex tri-state region. It is also the largest economic metropolitan area in North Louisiana. The area's economic activity is centered in the city of Shreveport, the parish seat of Caddo Parish.

Much of the Shreveport–Bossier City metropolitan area's economy is based on oil and natural gas, manufacturing, casinos, restaurants, and commerce. The city of Shreveport was once a major player in the national oil industry. Standard Oil of Louisiana and United Gas Corporation were headquartered in the city until the 1960s and 1980s. Since the downturn in the oil industry, telecommunications, technology, banking, healthcare and medical research, and advertising have been rising industries since the early 2000s. Filming has also been a prevalent industry in the metropolitan area.

The largest companies operating within the metropolitan area are Amazon, Calumet Specialty Products Partners, SWEPCO, AT&T Mobility and Cricket Wireless, Louisiana State University, JPMorgan Chase, Regions Financial Corporation, Comcast, and Walmart. AT&T, Chase, and Regions have regional offices within Shreveport's downtown area. The Tyler, Texas-based Brookshire Grocery Company operates numerous Super 1 Foods and Brookshire's supermarkets in the area.

From 2013 to 2014, Greater Shreveport had a gross metropolitan product of nearly $23.6 billion and negative growth rate of 5.4 percent. Its gross metropolitan product had been declining since 2011 to a low of $19 billion in 2016. In 2018, its gross metropolitan product rebounded to $23.7 billion. Following statewide economic recovery trends, the Shreveport–Bossier City metropolitan area was expected to gain at least 5,000 jobs by the third quarter of 2021. As of 2021, its gross metropolitan product grew to $24.1 billion.

== Media ==
The principal cities of Shreveport and Bossier City have their own newspapers, The Shreveport Times and Bossier Press-Tribune, respectively. Other major publications in the metropolitan area include The Barksdale Warrior, The Shreveport Sun, Caddo Citizen, SB Magazine, The Forum Newsweekly, City Lights, The Inquisitor and The Shreveport Catalyst.

The central city of Shreveport is home to several radio stations, particularly KWKH and KEEL. The three commercial television outlets for the metropolis are KSLA (CBS), founded in 1954; KTBS-TV (ABC), founded in 1955; and KTAL-TV, which arrived in Shreveport in September 1961 as the NBC station. KTBS was an NBC station, with occasional ABC programs, from 1955 to 1961, when it switched affiliation to ABC. KTAL, formerly known as KCMC of Texarkana, was a CBS outlet prior to conversion to NBC, when it began to cover Shreveport as well as Texarkana.

=== Television ===
Channel	Callsign	Affiliation	Subchannels		Owner
(Virtual/RF)	Callsign	Affiliation	Channel	Programming	Owner
3.1 (28)	KTBS-TV	ABC	3.2 3.3	The Local AccuWeather Channel KTBS 24 Hour News	KTBS, Inc. (Wray Family)
6.1 (15)	KTAL-TV	NBC			Nexstar Media Group
12.1 (17)	KSLA	CBS	12.2 12.3	This TV Bounce TV	Gray Television
21.1 (21)	KPXJ	The CW	21.2	Me-TV	KTBS, Inc.
24.1 (24)	KLTS-TV	PBS	24.2 24.3	PBS KidsCreate	Louisiana Public Broadcasting
33.1 (34)	KMSS-TV	Fox			Marshall Broadcasting Group(operated by Nexstar Media Group)
40	KADO-CD	Religious Ind.			Word of Life Ministries
42	K27NA-D	3ABN			Edge Spectrum, Inc.
45.1 (44)	KSHV-TV	MyNetworkTV			White Knight Broadcasting(operated by Nexstar Media Group)
54	K54CB	Ind.			
59	W59GO	TBN			Trinity Broadcasting Network

=== Radio ===
AM stations

Frequency	Callsign	Nickname	Format	Owner
710	KEEL		News/Talk	Townsquare Media
950	KRRP	Praise 950	Urban contemporary gospel	Maria Hobbs, Administratrix of Estate of Frank Van Dyke Hobb, Southeast Ark-La-Tex
980	KOKA		Black Gospel	Alpha Media
1070	KBCL		Contemporary Christian	Barnabus Center Ministries
1130	KWKH	1130 The Tiger	Sports/Talk	Townsquare Media
1240	KASO		Classic Hits	Greenwood Acres Baptist Church
1300	KSYB		Black Gospel	Amistad Radio Group
1320	KNCB	Sports 1320	Sports	Vivian
1340	KRMD (AM)	100.7 The Ticket	Sports/Talk	Cumulus Media
1450	KNOC	95.9 Kix Country	Classic country	Elite Radio Group, Southeast Ark-La-Tex
1460	KTKC (AM)	Red de Radio Amistad	Spanish Christian	Houston Christian Broadcasters, Inc.
1480	KIOU		Black Gospel	Wilkins Communications
1590	KGAS		Southern Gospel	Hanszen Broadcasting Group

FM stations

Frequency	Callsign	Nickname	Format	Owner
89.9	KDAQ		Classical	Red River Radio
91.3	KSCL		College Rock/Various Genres	Centenary College
92.1	KVFZ		Spanish	Alpha Media
92.1	KVCL		Country	Baldridge-Dumas Communications, Southeast Ark-La-Tex
92.9	KSPH	True Country	Classic country	Houston Christian Broadcasters, Inc.
93.7	KXKS-FM	Kiss Country 93–7	Country	Townsquare Media
94.5	KRUF	K94.5	Top 40	Townsquare Media
94.9	KSBH	94.9 The River	Country	Elite Radio Group, Southeast Ark-La-Tex
95.7	KLKL	The River 95.7	Oldies	Alpha Media
96.5	KVKI	96-5 KVKI	Adult Contemporary	Townsquare Media
97.3	KQHN	Q97.3	Hot Adult Contemporary	Cumulus Media
97.5	KDBH-FM	Country Legends 97.5	Classic country	Baldridge-Dumas Communications, Southeast Ark-La-Tex
98.1	KTAL	98 Rocks	Classic Rock	
98.9	KTUX	Highway 98.9	Classic rock	Townsquare Media
99.7	KMJJ	The Big Station 99.7 KMJJ	Urban Contemporary	Cumulus Media
99.9	KTEZ	Easy 99.9	Adult Contemporary	Baldridge-Dumas Communications, Southeast Ark-La-Tex
100.7	KZBL	Good Time Oldies	Oldies	Baldridge-Dumas Communications, Southeast Ark-La-Tex
101.1	KRMD	101.1 KRMD	Country	Cumulus Media
102.1	KDKS	Hot 102 Jamz	Urban Adult Contemporary	Alpha Media
102.9	KVMA-FM	Magic 102.9	Urban Adult Contemporary	Cumulus Media
103.7	KBTT	103.7 Tha Beat	Mainstream Urban	Alpha Media
104.7	KHMD		Country	Mansfield
105.3	KNCB-FM	Caddo Country 105.3	Classic Country	Vivian
106.5	KLNQ	K-Love	Contemporary Christian	EMF Broadcasting, Southeast Ark-La-Tex
106.7	KYXA	K-Love	Contemporary Christian	EMF Broadcasting
107.1	KWLV		Country	Baldridge-Dumas Communications, Southeast Ark-La-Tex

== Education ==
The Shreveport–Bossier City area is home to several colleges: among them, the Methodist-affiliated Centenary College of Louisiana (originally founded in the East Feliciana Parish town of Jackson in 1825, eventually relocating to Shreveport in 1908), Louisiana Baptist University and Theological Seminary (founded in 1973), Louisiana State University Health Sciences Center Shreveport (opened in 1969 as the only medical school in northern Louisiana) and one of the largest nursing schools in northern Louisiana, the Northwestern State University College of Nursing (opened in 1949) as well as satellite campuses of Louisiana State University (opened as a two-year institution in 1967, and expanded into a four-year college in 1976), and Southern University (opened in 1967 with a two-year associate's degree program).

== Transportation ==
The Shreveport Regional Airport is the major airport for the metropolitan region. Interstate 20 and Interstate 49 are also major highways connecting the metro area to others including the DFW metroplex in Texas and Tyler, Texas.

== See also ==
- Louisiana census statistical areas
- List of census-designated places in Louisiana
- List of cities, towns, and villages in Louisiana
- List of metropolitan areas of Louisiana
