= KTUX =

Radio station in Carthage, Texas

- Carthage, Texas; United States
- Broadcast area: Shreveport–Bossier City metropolitan area
- Frequency: 98.9 MHz
- Branding: Highway 98.9

Programming
- Language: English
- Format: Classic rock
- Affiliations: Compass Media Networks; United Stations Radio Networks

Ownership
- Owner: Townsquare Media; (Townsquare License, LLC)
- Sister stations: KEEL; KRUF; KVKI-FM; KWKH; KXKS-FM

History
- First air date: April 1, 1985

Technical information
- Licensing authority: FCC
- Facility ID: 35688
- Class: C1
- ERP: 100,000 watts
- HAAT: 219 meters (719 ft)
- Transmitter coordinates: 32°23′19″N 94°1′10″W

Links
- Public license information: Public file; LMS
- Webcast: Listen live
- Website: highway989.com

KTUX (98.9 FM) is an American Townsquare Media radio station licensed to Carthage, Texas, and serving the Longview-Marshall-Shreveport area. The station airs a classic rock format, and the studio location is shared with five sister stations in West Shreveport (one mile west of Shreveport Regional Airport), with the transmitter in Greenwood, Louisiana.

== History ==
KTUX began life on April 1, 1985, debuting as a contemporary hit radio station, "Fun Radio Tux 99." The month before Tux 99 officially debuted, the 98.9 frequency began stunting with a loop of the 1966 novelty song by Napoleon XIV "They're Coming to Take Me Away, Ha-Haaa!" The first official song played on Tux 99 was "Let's Go Crazy" by Prince. The KTUX studios were originally located at the transmitter site near Greenwood, LA. The original on-air lineup included Bobby Cook on the AM Drive, Cornstock at Middays, John Steel on the PM Drive, Machine Gun Dave 7pm to midnight, and The Moondog on overnights.

Within the bounds of Top 40 hits, TUX99 occasionally altered the ratios of its playlist through the early 1990s; each of these "format changes" was preceded by a stunting event, with the station playing the Napoleon XIV novelty song on constant repeat for several days. The song was occasionally played on normal rotation as well, acting as a sort of theme song for the station. In its earliest incarnation, with Top 40 jingles, "Tux 99" often took its musical cues from MTV rather than the Billboard charts. For example, "Home Sweet Home" by Mötley Crüe could be heard on "Tux 99." While never released to Top 40 radio, nor available as a 45 RPM single, "Home Sweet Home" spent months in summer 1985 on the top of the MTV charts in the U.S.

In 1986 KTUX moved its studios and most of its operations to Shreveport even though the city of license remained Carthage. Around 1993 the station underwent a drastic format and branding change. This format switch was to a wide-ranging rock format, with modern rock, alternative rock and grunge influences. This format soon yielded to a more traditional album-oriented hard rock format, accompanied by a stunting event which featured Billy Idol's "Rebel Yell" on repeat, in anticipation of the station's new "The Rebel Rocker, 99X" slogan. During the 1990s, KTUX mixed several different rock formats, ranging from AOR to active rock, alternative rock, and even classic rock.

By 1998 KTUX had a strong alternative rock lean. This changed in November 1998, when the station switched to an "All-Led Zeppelin" format as a stunt. The stunt lasted for a week. After which, KTUX was tweaked to a more uniform Active Rock format with the slogan changed to "Real Rock Radio 99X." This change lasted for about a year until Clear Channel acquired the station. In November 1999, the station featured yet another change focusing less on contemporary rock and more on classic rock. The name of the station was changed to "Rock 99." As Clear Channel took over operations, The Bob & Tom Show was added to mornings on KTUX. By fall 2000, KTUX "Rock 99" evolved back to Active Rock. This name lasted only for a few years, in which it was switched back to "99X" in late Summer 2002. Upon returning to the "99X" name, KTUX began to incorporate a more broadly focused Rock format. KTUX evolved back to an aggressive more current-based Active Rock format once again in 2012. About this time, KTUX switched syndicated morning shows from Bob & Tom to Free Beer & Hot Wings. In its final couple years, KTUX toned down its focus on newer music a bit and played many 90s tracks along with some classic rock. The "99X" moniker was dropped on New Years Day 2018. KTUX continued with the same format for a week identifying as "98.9" and teasing the start of the Walton & Johnson Show and a "brand new radio station."

On January 8, 2018, KTUX rebranded as "Highway 98.9". A new Classic Rock format accompanied the addition of perennial market-leading morning show, Walton & Johnson—The Radio Gawds. The station slogan is now "Highway 98.9--Walton & Johnson in the morning and Classic Rock all day".

== On Air Personalities ==
- Mornings – Walton & Johnson 5:30-10 A.M.
- Middays – Jen Austin 10 A.M.-3 P.M.
- Afternoons – Brandon Michael 3 P.M.-7 P.M.
- Evenings – Ultimate Classic Rock with Zach Martin
- Weekends –

Notable Past Personalities

In 2006 and 2007, Nick and Drew were Radio & Records nominees for Best Active Rock Show/Personality. Both Nick and Drew were named Edison Media Research's Top 30 Under 30 in radio.

The station's lineup in the 1980s and early 1990s included morning DJ and Program Director "Shotgun" Ken Shepherd, notable as the father of blues guitarist Kenny Wayne Shepherd.

Weekends were hosted by Robby Robertson, known as "The Jammer"
