= KRMD =

KRMD may refer to:

- KRMD (AM), a radio station (1340 AM) licensed to Shreveport, Louisiana, United States
- KRMD-FM, a radio station (101.1 FM) licensed to Oil City, Louisiana, United States
