= John D. Ewing =

American journalist

John Dunbrack Ewing, Sr.
- Born: February 13, 1892; New Orleans, Louisiana, USA
- Died: May 18, 1952 (aged 60); Shreveport, Caddo Parish, Louisiana, USA
- Occupations: Editor and publisher of the Shreveport Times and the Monroe News-Star-World from 1931 to 1952; owner of radio station KWKH
- Political party: Democrat
- Spouse: Helen Hamilton Gray (married 1919-his death)
- Children: John D. Ewing, Jr., and Helen May Ewing Clay
- Parent(s): Col. Robert W. Ewing and Catherine May Dunbrack Ewing

Notes
- The conservative Ewing was a delegate to the 1940 Democratic National Convention which shattered precedent by nominating Franklin D. Roosevelt to a third term.

John Dunbrack Ewing, Sr. (February 13, 1892 – May 18, 1952), was a Louisiana journalist who served as editor and publisher of both the Shreveport Times and the Monroe News-Star-World (since the Monroe News-Star) from 1931 until his death. He was also affiliated with radio station KWKH in Shreveport, the seat of Caddo Parish in northwestern Louisiana. KWKH was founded in 1922 and named in 1925 for its founder, W. K. Henderson.

In 1927, Ewing and former Shreveport mayor and businessman Andrew Querbes co-chaired a committee of prominent Shreveport citizens that began correspondence with the United States Department of War in Washington D. C. to sell Shreveport as the sight for a planned Army airfield that would serve as an expansion of the Third Attack Group, then located in Galveston, Texas. The group originally proposed land adjacent to Cross Lake but this location was deemed unsuitable by the War Department. Instead, approval was given for unincorporated land located in nearby Bossier Parish, which the City of Shreveport annexed through a municipal bond and donated to the federal government for construction of the facility, now known as Barksdale Air Force Base.
