= KVCL =

KVCL may refer to:

- KVCL-FM, a radio station (92.1 FM) licensed to serve Winnfield, Louisiana, United States
- KVCL (AM), a defunct radio station (1270 AM) formerly licensed to serve Winnfield, Louisiana, United States
