= KBTT =

Radio station in Haughton, Louisiana

Coordinates: 32.553°N 93.582°W

- Haughton, Louisiana; United States
- Broadcast area: Shreveport–Bossier City metropolitan area
- Frequency: 103.7 MHz (HD Radio)
- Branding: 103.7 Tha Beat

Programming
- Language: English
- Format: Mainstream urban

Ownership
- Owner: Connoisseur Media; (Alpha Media Licensee LLC)
- Sister stations: KDKS-FM; KLKL; KOKA; KTAL-FM

History
- First air date: June 8, 1993
- Former call signs: KZWB (1992–1996); KDKS-FM (1996–2000)
- Call sign meaning: "Beat"

Technical information
- Licensing authority: FCC
- Facility ID: 9221
- Class: A
- ERP: 6,000 watts
- HAAT: 100 meters (330 ft)

Links
- Public license information: Public file; LMS
- Webcast: Listen live
- Website: www.kbtt.fm

KBTT (103.7 FM, "103.7 Tha Beat") is an American radio station licensed to Haughton, Louisiana. The station is broadcasting a mainstream urban format. The station serves the Shreveport–Bossier City metropolitan area. KBTT is owned by Connoisseur Media, through licensee Alpha Media Licensee LLC. Its studios are located just north of downtown Shreveport, and the transmitter is in Eastwood, Louisiana.

== History ==
Around the late 1990s to early 2000 KBTT, originally called "K-103 Tha Beat", was launched with a rhythmic contemporary format originally as one of the first competitors to KMJJ. KBTT's sister station KDKS was launched at the same time as an urban contemporary format. But once KDKS turned its format over to urban AC to compete with newcomer KVMA-FM (KMJJ's sister), KBTT tilted its format over to mainstream urban since Shreveport-Bossier City market has a huge African American population to support it as opposed to rhythmic. It is the syndicated home of the Rickey Smiley Morning Show.
