= KVKI-FM =

Radio station in Shreveport, Louisiana

- Shreveport, Louisiana; United States
- Broadcast area: Shreveport–Bossier City metropolitan area
- Frequency: 96.5 MHz
- Branding: 96.5 KVKI

Programming
- Language: English
- Format: Adult contemporary
- Affiliations: Premiere Networks; Westwood One

Ownership
- Owner: Townsquare Media; (Townsquare License, LLC)
- Sister stations: KEEL, KRUF, KTUX, KWKH, KXKS-FM

History
- First air date: May 1959
- Former call signs: KBCL-FM (1959–1975); KEPT (1975–1983)
- Call sign meaning: similar to KVIL

Technical information
- Licensing authority: FCC
- Facility ID: 19560
- Class: C1
- ERP: 100,000 watts
- HAAT: 243 meters (797 ft)
- Transmitter coordinates: 32.594°N 93.861°W

Links
- Public license information: Public file; LMS
- Webcast: Listen live
- Website: 965kvki.com

KVKI-FM (96.5 MHz, "96.5 KVKI") is an American radio station licensed to Shreveport, Louisiana. The station is broadcasting an adult contemporary format, switching to Christmas music for much of November and December. KVKI-FM serves the Shreveport–Bossier City metropolitan area, and is owned by Townsquare Media. Its studios are shared with its other five sister stations in West Shreveport (one mile west of Shreveport Regional Airport), and the transmitter is in Blanchard, Louisiana. The call letters were originally KBCL-FM, and later became religious station KEPT, before the call letters were changed to KVKI to be similar to the call letters of the popular KVIL radio station in Dallas, Texas.

== History ==
96.5 sign-on the air in may of 1959 as, KBCL-FM. an a, easy listening format.
