= KRMD (AM) =

- Shreveport, Louisiana; United States
- Broadcast area: Shreveport-Bossier City
- Frequency: 1340 kHz
- Branding: Lite Rock 100.7

Programming
- Language: English
- Format: Silent (had been Adult Contemporary)

Ownership
- Owner: Cumulus Media; (Cumulus Licensing LLC)
- Sister stations: KMJJ-FM; KQHN; KRMD-FM; KVMA-FM

History
- First air date: November 3, 1926
- Last air date: March 14, 2025
- Former call signs: KRAC (1926–1928)
- Call sign meaning: Robert M. Dean (original owner)

Technical information
- Facility ID: 1305
- Class: C
- Power: 400 watts
- Transmitter coordinates: 32°29′36.5″N 93°45′55.6″W
- Translator: See § Translators

KRMD (1340 AM, "Lite Rock 100.7") was a commercial radio station licensed to Shreveport, Louisiana and serving the Ark-La-Tex region. The station was owned by Cumulus Media and based at the Louisiana Boardwalk in Bossier City, Louisiana. It aired an adult contemporary format, switching to Christmas music for much of November and December. The station's transmitter was just southwest of the I-20/I-49 interchange in Shreveport.

KRMD ceased operations on March 14, 2025. It was one of four silent Cumulus AM stations to surrender their licenses that September.

== History ==
KRMD was originally licensed and put on the air by R. M. Dean; the call sign was derived from his initials. The original license was issued, as KRAC, on November 3, 1926, with an original power of 50 watts. The station was founded by T. B. Lanford of Shreveport. In 1959, Thomas Austin Gresham (1921–2015), a 1946 graduate of Louisiana State University in Baton Rouge who was born in Buenos Aires, Argentina, came to Shreveport to manage KRMD. He was thereafter the executor of the Lanford estate from 1978 until his retirement a decade later. While in Shreveport, Gresham served for a year on the Caddo Parish Selective Service Board and was active in Rotary International and the American Contract Bridge League. Earlier, he had opened radio station KLOU and was the manager and part owner of KAOK, both in Lake Charles, Louisiana. He was a decorated first lieutenant with the 8th Air Force of the United States Army Air Corps in England during World War II. He flew twenty combat missions in B-17 bombers.

Until 2005, KRMD was "1340 The Zone" and was the only all-sports station in the "Ark-La-Tex". In 2005, KRMD changed its format to news/talk, branded as "SuperTalk 1340". Former programming was a mixture of political talk with syndicated hosts Neal Boortz, G. Gordon Liddy, and Bill O'Reilly and sports talk with Tim Brando. As of the 2006 NFL season, KRMD was the local affiliate for the Dallas Cowboys.

On December 17, 2012, KRMD returned to a sports format, branded as "Sports Talk 100.7", using the frequency of its FM translator (K264AS) in its branding. The change was part of Cumulus' rollout of the CBS Sports Radio network on its sports stations. In 2016, KRMD rebranded as "100.7 FM & 1340 AM The Ticket".

On March 9, 2020, Cumulus Media flipped KRMD and K264AS from sports to soft AC, as "Lite Rock 100.7".

KRMD ceased operations on March 14, 2025. It was one of 11 Cumulus stations to close the weekend of March 14, as part of a larger shutdown of underperforming Cumulus stations, and one of four defunct Cumulus stations to surrender their licenses that September. The Federal Communications Commission cancelled the station's license on September 29, 2025. Translator K264AS continues to operate with a simulcast of country music sister station KRMD-FM.

== Translators ==
Broadcast translator for KRMD
Call sign	Frequency	City of license	FID	ERP (W)	HAAT	Class	Transmitter coordinates	FCC info	Notes
K264AS	100.7 FM	Mooringsport, Louisiana	141176	250	148.9 m (489 ft)	D	32°29′36″N 93°45′55″W	LMS	Info located here:
