= Natchitoches Historic District =

Historic district in Louisiana, United States

- U.S. National Register of Historic Places
- U.S. National Historic Landmark District
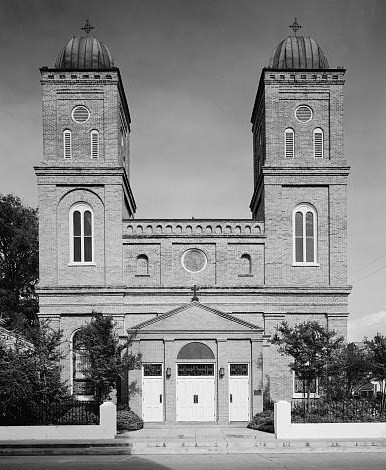
- Church of the Immaculate Conception

- Location within Louisiana Location within the United States
- Location: Natchitoches, Louisiana
- Coordinates: 31.754330°N 93.092108°W
- Area: 280 acres (110 ha)
- Architectural style: Late Victorian, Colonial, Bungalow/craftsman, Queen Anne
- NRHP reference No.: 74000928 (original); 80001740 (increase)

Significant dates
- Added to NRHP: June 5, 1974
- Boundary increase: November 25, 1980
- Designated NHLD: April 16, 1984

Natchitoches Historic District (/ˈnækətɪʃ/ NAK-ə-tish; named after the indigenous people of the area), also known as Natchitoches National Historic Landmark District, is a historic district encompassing the heart of Natchitoches, Louisiana, the oldest permanent European settlement in what is now Louisiana, and the oldest permanent European settlement in the wider geographic area involved in the Louisiana Purchase. It was founded by the French in 1714 and declared a National Historic Landmark in 1984.

== Description and history ==
The city of Natchitoches, when founded, was located on the banks at the head of navigation of the Red River in northern Louisiana, roughly midway between Alexandria and Shreveport. It was founded in 1714 by French explorers, who were seeking to firmly establish French claims to the territory against those of New Spain. As such, it eventually developed into a significant trading center, with goods flowing among the French, Spanish, and area Native American tribes. The city's oldest streets are laid out parallel to the river, and the long-distance road network was expanded after French Louisiana was ceded to Spain in 1763. The city remained an important regional trading center until the second quarter of the 19th century, when the Red River's course shifted eastward, leaving the downtown flanking the old channel, now known as the Cane River. This put an end to major development in the city, and helped preserve much of its 18th-century character.

The historic district extends along both sides of the old river channel, but only includes properties on Williams Street on the east side. It extends for several blocks (as far as Fourth Street) on the west side, between the Keyser Street bridge in the south and Texas Street in the north. It has more than 200 historic structures, including a significant concentration of 18th and early 19th-century buildings built using the French colonial construction technique of bousillage.

Instrumental in the establishment of the district was the historical preservationist Robert DeBlieux, who served as mayor of Natchitoches from 1976-1980.

== Contributing properties ==
- Basilica of the Immaculate Conception, listed as the Church of the Immaculate Conception.

== Media ==
- KDBH-FM - 97.5 - Classic country
- KZBL - 100.7 - Oldies

== See also ==
- List of National Historic Landmarks in Louisiana
- National Register of Historic Places listings in Natchitoches Parish, Louisiana
