= KXKS-FM =

Radio station in Shreveport, Louisiana

- Shreveport, Louisiana; United States
- Broadcast area: Shreveport–Bossier City metropolitan area
- Frequency: 93.7 MHz
- Branding: Kiss Country 93.7

Programming
- Language: English
- Format: Country
- Affiliations: Compass Media Networks

Ownership
- Owner: Townsquare Media; (Townsquare License, LLC)
- Sister stations: KEEL, KRUF, KTUX, KVKI-FM, KWKH

History
- Founded: July 14, 1966
- First air date: May 17, 1968
- Former call signs: KEEL-FM (1968–1972); KMBQ (1972–1986); KITT (1986–2001)
- Call sign meaning: Kiss (station branding)

Technical information
- Licensing authority: FCC
- Facility ID: 46982
- Class: C
- ERP: 100,000 watts
- HAAT: 308 meters (1,010 ft)
- Transmitter coordinates: 32°40′39.00″N 93°55′41.00″W

Links
- Public license information: Public file; LMS
- Webcast: Listen live
- Website: mykisscountry937.com

KXKS-FM (93.7 MHz, "Kiss Country 93.7") is an American country-formatted radio station serving the Shreveport–Bossier City metropolitan area, licensed to Shreveport. A Townsquare Media station, it operates with an ERP of 100 kW from a transmitter in Mooringsport. Its studios are located on Westport Avenue in West Shreveport (one mile west of Shreveport Regional Airport), and are shared with its other five sister stations in the market.

== History ==
=== Attention Misfts! – The launch of KEEL-FM ===
KEEL-FM had its original construction permit issued on July 14, 1966, as the FM counterpart of KEEL, which it has always been co-owned with. In preparation of the new FM station's sign-on "around Jan. 1, 1969", construction began in October 1967 on a new 7,800-square-foot, three-story building in downtown Shreveport to house KEEL and KEEL-FM. The new building represented a $250,000 investment by KEEL's then-owner, Nashville-based LIN Broadcasting, who had acquired the AM station in 1962 and would be the FM station's founding owner. A transmitter was originally located on 937 Stoner Street in the city of Shreveport, operating with 100 kW of power but from a 263-foot tower, a fraction of the height it operates from now.

The station signed on for the first time on May 17, 1968, at 7:00 P.M., coinciding with the opening of the new studio building, which was six months ahead of the originally announced date. The station originally broadcast a MOR format branded as "KEEL-FM Stereo 93.7"; it was described by the station as "bright, happy, exciting and very adult". A series of ads ran in local newspapers, informing potential listeners dissatisfied with other local stations in the area referred to as "misfits" and "the neglected majority", about the arrival of KEEL-FM. The station's permanent license was granted on June 23, 1969. In its early days, KEEL-FM broadcast Tulane Green Wave football games as a complement to the Arkansas Razorbacks games broadcast by KEEL.
