= KRUF =

Radio station in Shreveport, Louisiana

- Shreveport, Louisiana; United States
- Broadcast area: Shreveport–Bossier City metropolitan area
- Frequency: 94.5 MHz
- Branding: K945

Programming
- Language: English
- Format: Contemporary hit radio
- Affiliations: Compass Media Networks; Premiere Networks; The Weather Channel

Ownership
- Owner: Townsquare Media; (Townsquare License, LLC)
- Sister stations: KEEL, KTUX, KVKI-FM, KWKH, KXKS-FM

History
- First air date: November 21, 1948
- Former call signs: KWKH-FM (1948–1973); KROK (1973–1984); KWKH-FM (1984–1996)
- Call sign meaning: "Ruff" (reference to former "Big Dog 94-5" branding)

Technical information
- Licensing authority: FCC
- Facility ID: 60265
- Class: C0
- ERP: 100,000 watts
- HAAT: 334 meters (1,096 ft)
- Transmitter coordinates: 32°40′13.00″N 93°55′59.00″W

Links
- Public license information: Public file; LMS
- Webcast: Listen live
- Website: k945.com

KRUF (94.5 MHz, "K945") is an American radio station licensed to Shreveport, Louisiana. The station is broadcasting a Top 40 (CHR) format. KRUF serves the Shreveport–Bossier City metropolitan area. The station is owned by Townsquare Media. Its studios are shared with its other five sister stations in West Shreveport (one mile west of Shreveport Regional Airport), and the transmitter is in Mooringsport, Louisiana. The call letters before becoming KRUF were KWKH-FM and KROK and had air personalities such as Tim Brando of CBS Sports back in the late 1970s, early 1980s.

== History ==
On November 21, 1948, KWKH-FM went on air. It was operated by International Broadcasting Corporation, which was owned by The Shreveport Times.

On August 12, 1996, KWKH-FM changed its format to Top 40 (CHR), branded first as Big Dog 94-5. On November 1, 1996, the station changed its callsign to KRUF. At the end of the 90s the station started identifying as "K94.5", discontinuing the "Big Dog" moniker by 2000.
