= KDKS-FM =

Radio station in Blanchard, Louisiana

Coordinates: 32°35′57.5″N 93°54′1.7″W

- Blanchard, Louisiana; United States
- Broadcast area: Shreveport–Bossier City metropolitan area
- Frequency: 102.1 MHz (HD Radio)
- Branding: 102.1 KDKS

Programming
- Language: English
- Format: Urban adult contemporary
- Affiliations: Premiere Networks

Ownership
- Owner: Connoisseur Media; (Alpha Media Licensee LLC)
- Sister stations: KBTT; KLKL; KOKA; KTAL-FM

History
- First air date: September 30, 1998
- Former call signs: KRVQ (1998–2000)

Technical information
- Licensing authority: FCC
- Facility ID: 16436
- Class: C3
- ERP: 20,000 watts
- HAAT: 112 meters (367 ft)

Links
- Public license information: Public file; LMS
- Webcast: Listen live
- Website: www.kdks.fm

KDKS-FM (102.1 MHz, "102.1 KDKS") is an American radio station licensed to Blanchard, Louisiana. The station broadcasts an urban adult contemporary format. The station serves the Shreveport–Bossier City metropolitan area. KDKS-FM is owned by Connoisseur Media, through licensee Alpha Media Licensee LLC. Its studios are located just north of downtown Shreveport, and the transmitter is in Blanchard.

== History ==
Around the late 1990s to early 2000s KDKS, originally called "HOT 102", was launched with an urban contemporary format originally as one of the first competitors to challenge KMJJ, and was launched alongside sister station KBTT (then a rhythmic). At first it was an urban AC station until it chose to aim at a more broader 18–49 audience by adding hip hop to the playlist a little later on. When KVMA-FM was launched in 2004, KDKS decided to turn its format back around to urban AC and instead take its newcoming urban rival on, while the owners shifted KBTT from rhythmic to mainstream urban and take on KMJJ from that point. Originally the home of Tom Joyner (moved to KVMA), KDKS is now the syndicated home of Steve Harvey in the mornings.

State Representative Roy A. Burrell of Shreveport is a former talk show host on KDKS.
