= Greenwood, Louisiana =

- Suburban town
- Town of Greenwood
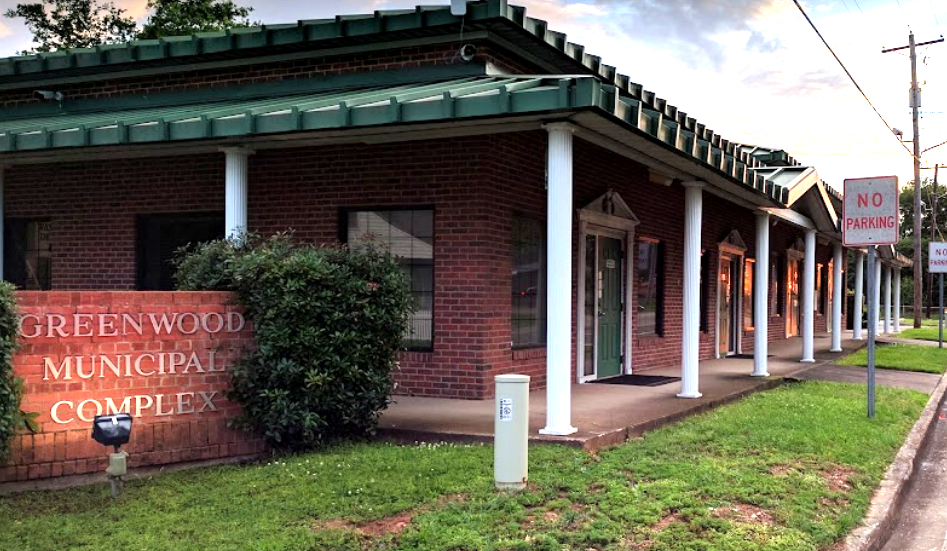
- Greenwood Municipal Complex

- Wordmark
- Motto: Gateway to Louisiana
- Location of Greenwood in Caddo Parish, Louisiana.

- Location of Louisiana in the United States
- Coordinates: 32°26′30″N 93°59′10″W
- Country: United States
- State: Louisiana
- Parish: Caddo
- Founded: 1839

Area
  - Total: 9.01 sq mi (23.34 km^{2})
  - Land: 8.99 sq mi (23.29 km^{2})
  - Water: 0.015 sq mi (0.04 km^{2})
- Elevation: 276 ft (84 m)

Population (2020)
  - Total: 3,166
  - Rank: CD: 3rd
  - Density: 352.0/sq mi (135.91/km^{2})
- Time zone: UTC-6 (CST)
  - Summer (DST): UTC-5 (CDT)
- ZIP code: 71033
- Area code: 318
- FIPS code: 22-31705
- GNIS feature ID: 2406617
- Website: greenwoodla.org

Greenwood is a suburban town in southern Caddo Parish, which is located in the northwest corner of the U.S. state of Louisiana. With a population of 3,166 at the 2020 United States census, it is the third most populous incorporated municipality in Caddo Parish after Shreveport and Blanchard. Part of the Shreveport-Bossier City metropolitan statistical area, it is located 15 miles west of downtown Shreveport.

== History ==
Greenwood was established by European Americans in 1839 after the forced Indian Removal of the Caddo people to Indian Territory (now Oklahoma) west of the Mississippi River.

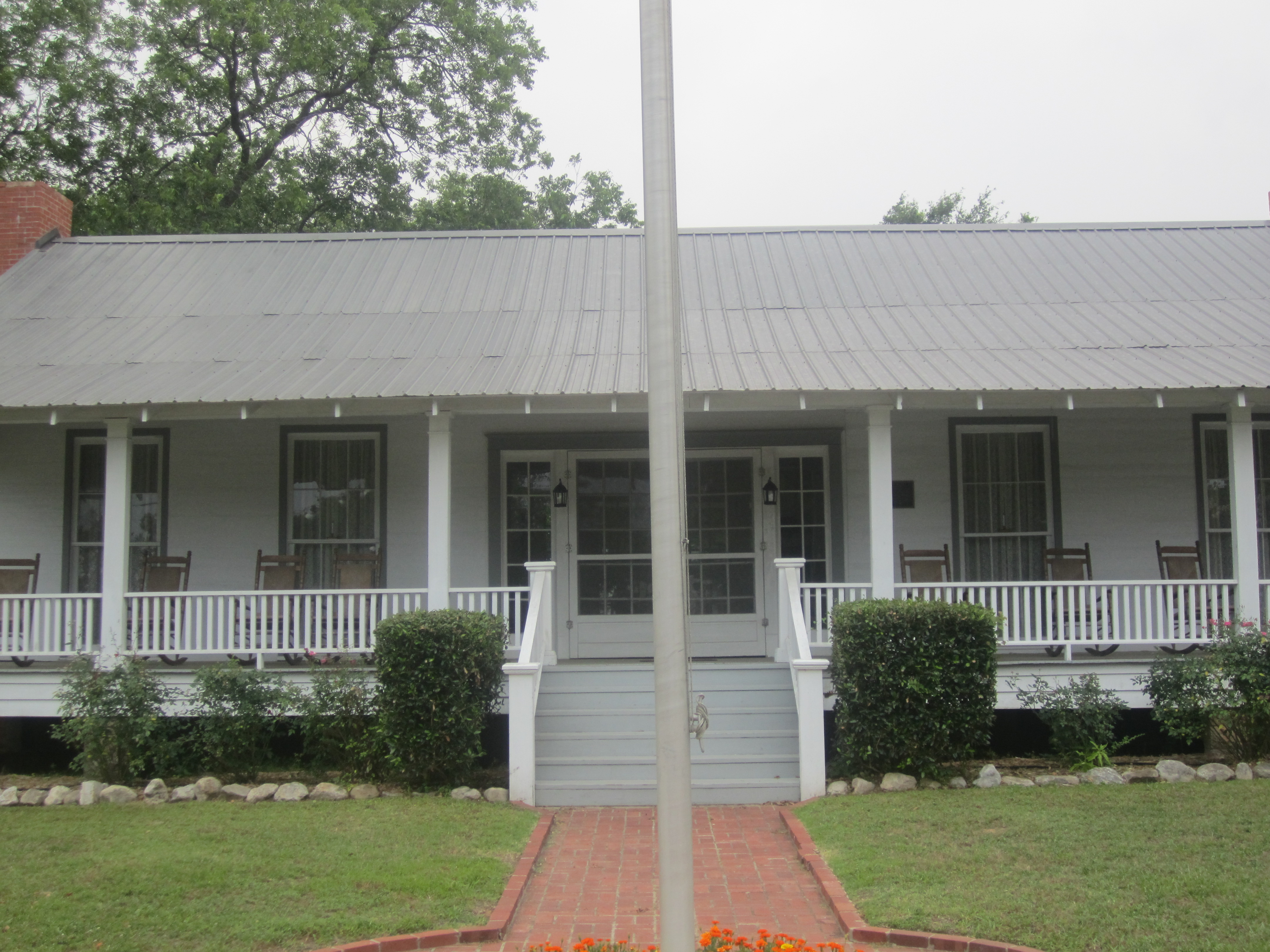
The Dunn House, a hospital for wounded Confederates, now serves as headquarters of the Greenwood Chamber of Commerce

As in the rest of Louisiana, most Black or African Americans were disenfranchised from the turn of the 20th century into the 1960s, and the state was dominated by white Democrats; Caddo Parish Sheriff J. Howell Flournoy, who served a record 26 years in office from 1940 to 1966, was born in Greenwood in 1891 and was part of the political Flournoy dynasty.

Earnest Lampkins (1928–2018), a native of Shreveport, earned a PhD and had a career as a music educator. He taught music at all levels, becoming supervisor of music for Caddo Parish. He founded the Louisiana School of Professions. In 2004, Lampkins was elected as the first black mayor of Greenwood, where he had long been active in the community. Against running for a second term, Lampkins ceased any intentions due to gunshots fired into his house, alongside continued threats and racism.

== Geography ==
Greenwood is located in western Caddo Parish. Greenwood Road (U.S. Routes 80 and 79) is the main route through the center of town. Interstate 20 passes through the northern part of the town, with access from exits 3 and 5. Downtown Shreveport is 15 miles (24 km) to the east, and Waskom, Texas, is 6 miles (10 km) to the west. Carthage, Texas, is 31 miles (50 km) to the southwest down U.S. 79. Greenwood is approximately 165 miles east of Dallas, Texas, and about 290 miles northwest of New Orleans.

According to the United States Census Bureau, Greenwood has a total area of 9.0 square miles (23.3 km^{2}), of which 0.02 square miles (0.04 km^{2}), or 0.19%, is water.

== Demographics ==
Historical population
Census	Pop.	Note	%±
1970	212		—
1980	1,043		392.0%
1990	2,092		100.6%
2000	2,458		17.5%
2010	3,219		31.0%
2020	3,166		−1.6%
2025 (est.)	3,077	▼	−2.8%
U.S. Decennial Census

Since the establishment of Greenwood, its population was overshadowed by the larger and nearby Shreveport to its east, and Waskom, Texas to the west; at the 1970 United States census, the town of Greenwood had a population of 212. In 2020, the U.S. Census Bureau tabulated a population of 3,166, down from the historic high of 3,219 at the 2010 United States census. At the publication of the 2020 census, Greenwood remained the third largest community in Caddo Parish, while Blanchard overtook Vivian as the second-largest.

There were 1,351 households at the 2020 American Community Survey's 5 year estimates program, among which 755 were married-couple households. The average family size was 2.80, and the average household size was 2.34; in 2000, the average household size was 2.55 and the average family size was 3.00. Among its population, 92.3% have attained a high school diploma or higher, and 27.2% of residents attained a bachelor's degree or higher.

In 2000, the median income for a household in the town was $40,408, and the median income for a family was $52,955. Males had a median income of $38,750 versus $26,622 for females. The per capita income for the town was $19,374. About 9.3% of families and 13.3% of the population were below the poverty line, including 19.3% of those under age 18 and 20.9% of those age 65 or over. In 2018, the American Community Survey determined the median income was $60,809; the mean income was $91,984, making Greenwood one of the wealthiest communities within the Shreveport-Bossier City metropolitan area. During the American Community Survey's 2020 census estimates, its median household income was $55,034; the mean income also slightly declined to $86,979.

=== Race and ethnicity ===
Greenwood racial and ethnic composition as of 2020
Race and ethnicity	Number	Percentage
White (non-Hispanic)	1,908	60.27%
Black or African American (non-Hispanic)	859	27.13%
Native American	22	0.69%
Asian	24	0.76%
Other/Mixed	193	6.1%
Hispanic or Latino	160	5.05%

For a majority of Greenwood's history, the town has been predominantly non-Hispanic white, though diversification has broadened the racial and ethnic makeup of the suburban community alongside much of the United States.

According to the 2000 U.S. census, the racial and ethnic makeup of Greenwood was 77.01% White American, 20.63% Black or African American, 0.41% American Indian and Alaska Native, 0.33% Asian, 0.16% Native Hawaiian or other Pacific Islander, 0.45% from other races and ethnicities, and 1.02% from two or more races. Hispanic or Latino Americans of any race were 1.79% of the population. By the 2020 census, its racial and ethnic makeup was 60.27% non-Hispanic white, 27.13% Black or African American, 0.69% American Indian and Alaska Native, 0.76% Asian, 6.1% multiracial or of another race or ethnicity, and 5.05% Hispanic or Latino American of any race. The growing Hispanic or Latino American population reflected nationwide demographic trends following the 2014 to 2019 census estimates and 2020 census.

=== Religion ===
According to Sperling's BestPlaces in 2020, the population of Greenwood has remained primarily Christian. Dominated by Protestantism as most of North and Central Louisiana, Baptists were the largest Christian tradition by adherence. Baptists in Greenwood are mainly served by the Southern Baptist Convention, though the predominantly Black or African American National Baptist Convention of America and National Baptist Convention, USA, Inc. have congregations throughout the area. Following, Methodists and Pentecostals dominated the religious landscape, with Catholic Christians served by the Roman Catholic Diocese of Shreveport.

== Education ==
It is in the Caddo Parish School District.
