= KTHP =

- Hemphill, Texas; United States
- Broadcast area: Lufkin-Nacogdoches
- Frequency: 103.9 MHz
- Branding: KTHP 103.9

Programming
- Format: Classic country
- Affiliations: Westwood One

Ownership
- Owner: BDC Radio; (Baldridge-Dumas Communications, Inc.)
- Sister stations: KWLV, KTEZ, KVCL-FM, KDBH-FM, KZBL, KBDV, KWLA

History
- First air date: 1975
- Call sign meaning: Texas Hemphill

Technical information
- Licensing authority: FCC
- Facility ID: 84879
- Class: A
- ERP: 4,500 watts
- HAAT: 115.0 meters (377.3 ft)
- Transmitter coordinates: 31°25′24.00″N 93°50′30.00″W

Links
- Public license information: Public file; LMS
- Website: KTHP website

KTHP (103.9 MHz, "Classic Country Favorites") is an American radio station broadcasting a classic country music format. Licensed to Hemphill, Texas, United States, the station serves the Lufkin-Nacogdoches area. The station is currently owned by Baldridge-Dumas Communications and features programming from Westwood One.
