= Basilica of the Immaculate Conception (Natchitoches, Louisiana) =

Historic church in Louisiana, United States

- Church of the Immaculate Conception
- U.S. Historic district – Contributing property
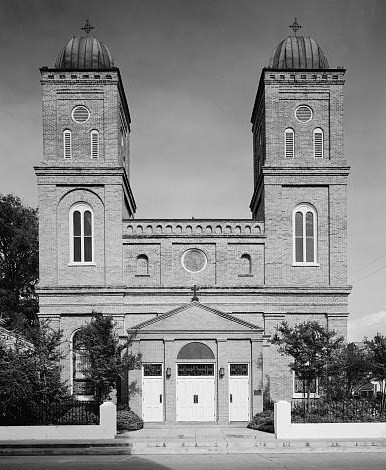
- Basilica of the Immaculate Conception

- Location within Louisiana Location within the United States
- Location: 145 Church St. Natchitoches, Louisiana, USA
- Coordinates: 31°45′40″N 93°05′15″W
- Built: 1857-c. 1900
- Part of: Natchitoches Historic District (ID74000928)
- Added to NRHP: June 05, 1974

The Basilica of the Immaculate Conception is a minor basilica located in Natchitoches, Louisiana, United States. It is also a parish church in the Diocese of Alexandria. The church building is the seventh structure to house the parish and was at one time the cathedral for the Roman Catholic Diocese of Natchitoches. As the Church of the Immaculate Conception it was listed as contributing property in the Natchitoches Historic District on the National Register of Historic Places.

== History ==
The parish was founded in 1728. The first church was built within the walls of Fort St. Jean Baptiste sometime between 1729 and 1733. A second church, called St. John the Baptist, was built by 1738. It was located between the second fort and what is now known as the American Cemetery. A third church, built of stone, was constructed at the same location in 1771. The fourth church was built fourteen years later. Because the town had moved further north it was located at what is now Front and Church Streets. A fifth church was built of brick and measured 50 feet (15 m) wide by 100 feet (30 m) long. Its location is believed to be the site of what is now called Church Street Inn and was destroyed in the Natchitoches fire of 1838. It was replaced by the sixth church, which was completed in the Spring of 1839. It was this church that became the first cathedral for the Diocese of Natchitoches, which was established by Pope Pius IX in 1853.

The present church was begun in 1857, but because of the American Civil War and the period of Reconstruction that followed it was not completed until sometime between 1900 and 1905. The church building ceased being a cathedral on August 6, 1910, when the see city was transferred from Natchitoches to Alexandria. It was listed as a contributing property in the Natchitoches Historic District in 1974. Pope Benedict XVI elevated the church to the status of a minor basilica on February 22, 2009.

== See also ==
- Isle Brevelle
- List of Catholic cathedrals in the United States
- List of cathedrals in the United States
- Natchitoches Parish
- Anne des Cadeaux
- Cane River
- Natchitoches, Louisiana
- Louis Juchereau de St. Denis
