= KRMD-FM =

Radio station in Oil City, Louisiana

- Oil City, Louisiana; United States
- Broadcast area: Shreveport–Bossier City metropolitan area
- Frequency: 101.1 MHz
- Branding: 101.1 KRMD

Programming
- Language: English
- Format: Country
- Affiliations: Westwood One

Ownership
- Owner: Cumulus Media; (Cumulus Licensing LLC)
- Sister stations: KMJJ; KQHN; KVMA-FM

History
- First air date: 1948
- Former call signs: KJKL (1971–1973)
- Call sign meaning: Robert M. Dean (original owner)

Technical information
- Licensing authority: FCC
- Facility ID: 1304
- Class: C0
- ERP: 97,700 watts; MAX: 100,000 watts
- HAAT: 345.7 meters (1,134 ft)
- Transmitter coordinates: 32°41′8.5″N 93°56′0.7″W

Links
- Public license information: Public file; LMS
- Webcast: Listen live
- Website: www.krmd.com

KRMD-FM (101.1 MHz, "101.1 KRMD") is an American contemporary country music formatted radio station licensed to Oil City, Louisiana, United States, and serving the Shreveport–Bossier City metropolitan area. The station is owned by Cumulus Media and based at the Louisiana Boardwalk in Bossier City, with a transmitter based in Mooringsport (with an auxiliary backup transmitter outside downtown Shreveport).

Former studio locations include the Jefferson Building (near downtown Shreveport), the Alexander Avenue building (near Centenary College), and presently the Louisiana Boardwalk in Bossier City.

== History ==
In 1948, KRMD-FM went on air as the FM sister station of KRMD (1340 AM). In 1971, the callsign changed to KJKL, and the station played country music. In 1973, the station reverted to KRMD-FM.

On February 3, 2014, KRMD-FM rebranded as "Nash FM 101.1". Two years later, the station returned to its former "101.1 KRMD" branding.
