= KBEF =

Radio station in Gibsland, Louisiana

- Gibsland, Louisiana; United States
- Frequency: 104.5 MHz
- Branding: "Real Country 104.5"

Programming
- Format: Classic Country
- Affiliations: Local Radio Networks; ABC Radio; Texas Rangers

Ownership
- Owner: Richard Chreene and Marvin Davis; (Minden Broadcasting, LLC)
- Sister stations: KASO

History
- First air date: 2001

Technical information
- Licensing authority: FCC
- Facility ID: 82842
- Class: A
- ERP: 6,000 watts
- HAAT: 100 meters (330 ft)
- Transmitter coordinates: 32°31′59″N 93°11′34″W

Links
- Public license information: Public file; LMS
- Website: Official Website

KBEF (104.5 FM, "Real Country 104.5") is a radio station broadcasting a Classic Country format. Licensed to Gibsland, Louisiana, United States, the station is currently owned by Minden Broadcasting, LLC and features programming from Local Radio Networks.

== History ==
The Federal Communications Commission issued a construction permit for the station on March 9, 1998, to Northstar Enterprises, Inc. The station was assigned the KBEF call sign on May 1, 1998. On September 30, 2000, the permit was assigned by Northstar to the former owners, the Greenwood Acres Baptist Church. The station was granted its license to cover on May 23, 2001.

In 2013, Richard Chreene and Marvin Davis purchased KBEF and its sister station KASO in Minden from Robert and Mary Whitaker, the previous owners. The purchase, at a price of $260,000, was consummated on October 23, 2013.
