= KTAL-FM =

Radio station in Texarkana, Texas

Coordinates: 32.903°N 94.006°W

- Texarkana, Texas; United States
- Broadcast area: Texarkana metropolitan area Shreveport–Bossier City metropolitan area
- Frequency: 98.1 MHz
- Branding: 98 Rocks

Programming
- Language: English
- Format: Classic rock
- Affiliations: New Orleans Saints Radio Network

Ownership
- Owner: Connoisseur Media; (Alpha Media Licensee LLC)
- Sister stations: KBTT; KDKS-FM; KLKL; KOKA

History
- First air date: 1945
- Call sign meaning: Texas, Arkansas, Louisiana

Technical information
- Licensing authority: FCC
- Facility ID: 33728
- Class: C0
- ERP: 100,000 watts
- HAAT: 415 meters (1,362 ft)

Links
- Public license information: Public file; LMS
- Webcast: Listen live
- Website: 98rocks.fm

KTAL-FM (98.1 MHz, "98 Rocks") is an American radio station licensed to Texarkana, Texas, The station is broadcasting a classic rock format. The station serves the Shreveport–Bossier City metropolitan area. KTAL-FM is owned by Connoisseur Media, through licensee Alpha Media Licensee LLC. Its studios are located just north of downtown Shreveport, and the transmitter is in Vivian, Louisiana.

The station is a former sister station of KCMC and KTAL-TV, all of which were owned for many years by WEHCO Media until the company sold its broadcasting assets.

== On-air personalities ==
- Greg The Nukeman Hanson
- Bobby Cook
- Gary Newell
- Lonnie Haskins
