= KQHN =

Radio station in Waskom, Texas

- Waskom, Texas; United States
- Broadcast area: Shreveport–Bossier City metropolitan area
- Frequency: 97.3 MHz
- Branding: Q97.3

Programming
- Language: English
- Format: Hot adult contemporary
- Affiliations: Westwood One

Ownership
- Owner: Cumulus Media; (Cumulus Licensing LLC)
- Sister stations: KMJJ-FM; KRMD-FM; KVMA-FM

History
- First air date: 1968
- Former call signs: KFMV (1968–1983); KVMA-FM (1983–2005); KBED (3/2005-4/2005)
- Former frequencies: 107.9 MHz (1968–2005)

Technical information
- Licensing authority: FCC
- Facility ID: 12414
- Class: C2
- ERP: 42,000 watts
- HAAT: 162.5 meters (533 ft)
- Transmitter coordinates: 32°29′36.5″N 93°45′55.6″W

Links
- Public license information: Public file; LMS
- Webcast: Listen live
- Website: www.q973radio.com

KQHN (97.3 MHz, "Q97.3") is an American hot adult contemporary radio station licensed to Waskom, Texas, and serves the Shreveport–Bossier City metropolitan area.

The station is owned by Cumulus Media and broadcasts from the Louisiana Boardwalk shopping center in Bossier City, Louisiana, along with sister stations KRMD-FM, KMJJ, and KVMA-FM.

The station was assigned the KQHN call letters by the Federal Communications Commission on April 7, 2005.

== History ==
The station was originally licensed to Magnolia, Arkansas, as KFMV on 107.9 MHz.

In 2004, Cumulus Media bought the station and tried to move the station into the Shreveport market, by moving the station's city of license to Oil City, Louisiana. However the station's transmitter on 107.9 MHz from its new location caused interference with air traffic control at Barksdale Air Force Base and was forced off the air by the military and Federal Communications Commission (FCC). Ultimately the station's frequency was moved to 97.3 MHz and the city of license to Waskom, Texas. Although the transmitter is located in Shreveport, the city of license is for Waskom, Texas, and serves the Ark-La-Tex area. The transmitter is located near downtown Shreveport on a landmark non-supported structure nicknamed Eiffel Tower. KQHN-FM transmit facilities are co-located with KVMA-FM, KMJJ-FM, and the KRMD-FM auxiliary site on the former KRMD tower.

When the station relocated to Shreveport and 97.3 in early 2005 under new callsign KQHN, it began testing the new signal with a stunt loop of "Swans Splashdown" by Jean-Jacques Perrey. On April 7, 2005, KQHN changed its format to hot adult contemporary, branded as "Mix 97.3". The first song on Mix was "Better Days" by Goo Goo Dolls.

On April 13, 2012, KQHN changed its format from hot adult contemporary to top 40 (CHR), branded as "i97.3". On September 14, 2017, KQHN reverted its format from top 40 (CHR) to hot adult contemporary, branded as "Q97.3".
