= KWLA =

Coordinates: 31°20′06″N 93°25′58″W

- Anacoco, Louisiana; United States
- Broadcast area: Leesville, Many
- Frequency: 103.1 MHz
- Branding: KWLA 103.1

Programming
- Language: English
- Format: News/Talk

Ownership
- Owner: BDC Radio; (Baldridge-Dumas Communications, Inc.)
- Sister stations: KWLV, KZBL, KTEZ, KDBH-FM, KVCL-FM, KBDV, KTHP

History
- First air date: September 10, 2014; 11 years ago
- Call sign meaning: K West LouisianA

Technical information
- Licensing authority: FCC
- Facility ID: 191486
- Class: C3
- ERP: 25,000 Watts
- HAAT: 100 meters (330 ft)
- Transmitter coordinates: 31° 20' 06" N, 93° 25' 58" W

Links
- Public license information: Public file; LMS
- Webcast: Listen Live
- Website: kwla1031.com

KWLA (103.1 MHz, "KWLA 103.1") is an American radio station licensed to Anacoco, Louisiana and broadcasting to Leesville, Louisiana with a News/Talk format.

== On air ==
- Weekday Schedule
- American Ground Radio - 5 AM-7 AM
- Tedd Dumas - 7 AM-9 AM
- Moon Griffon - 9 AM-11 AM
- Dan Bongino - 11 AM-2 PM
- Sean Hannity - 2 PM-5 PM
- Joe Pags - 5 PM-8 PM
- Tedd Dumas - 8 PM-9 PM
- Ground Zero with Clyde Lewis - 9 PM-12 AM
- Coast to Coast AM - 12 AM-5 AM
