= KASO =

Radio station in Minden, Louisiana

- Minden, Louisiana; United States
- Broadcast area: Shreveport–Bossier City metropolitan area
- Frequency: 1240 kHz
- Branding: AM 1240 KASO

Programming
- Language: English
- Format: Classic hits
- Affiliations: Fox News Radio; Westwood One; Texas Rangers (MLB)

Ownership
- Owner: Richard Chreene and Marvin Davis; (Minden Broadcasting, LLC)
- Sister stations: KBEF

History
- First air date: 1952

Technical information
- Licensing authority: FCC
- Facility ID: 13803
- Class: C
- Power: 1,000 watts unlimited
- Transmitter coordinates: 32°37′50″N 93°16′56″W

Links
- Public license information: Public file; LMS
- Webcast: KASO Stream
- Website: www.kbef.com

KASO (1240 AM) is an American radio station broadcasting a classic hits format. Licensed to Minden, Louisiana, United States, the station serves the Shreveport–Bossier City metropolitan area.

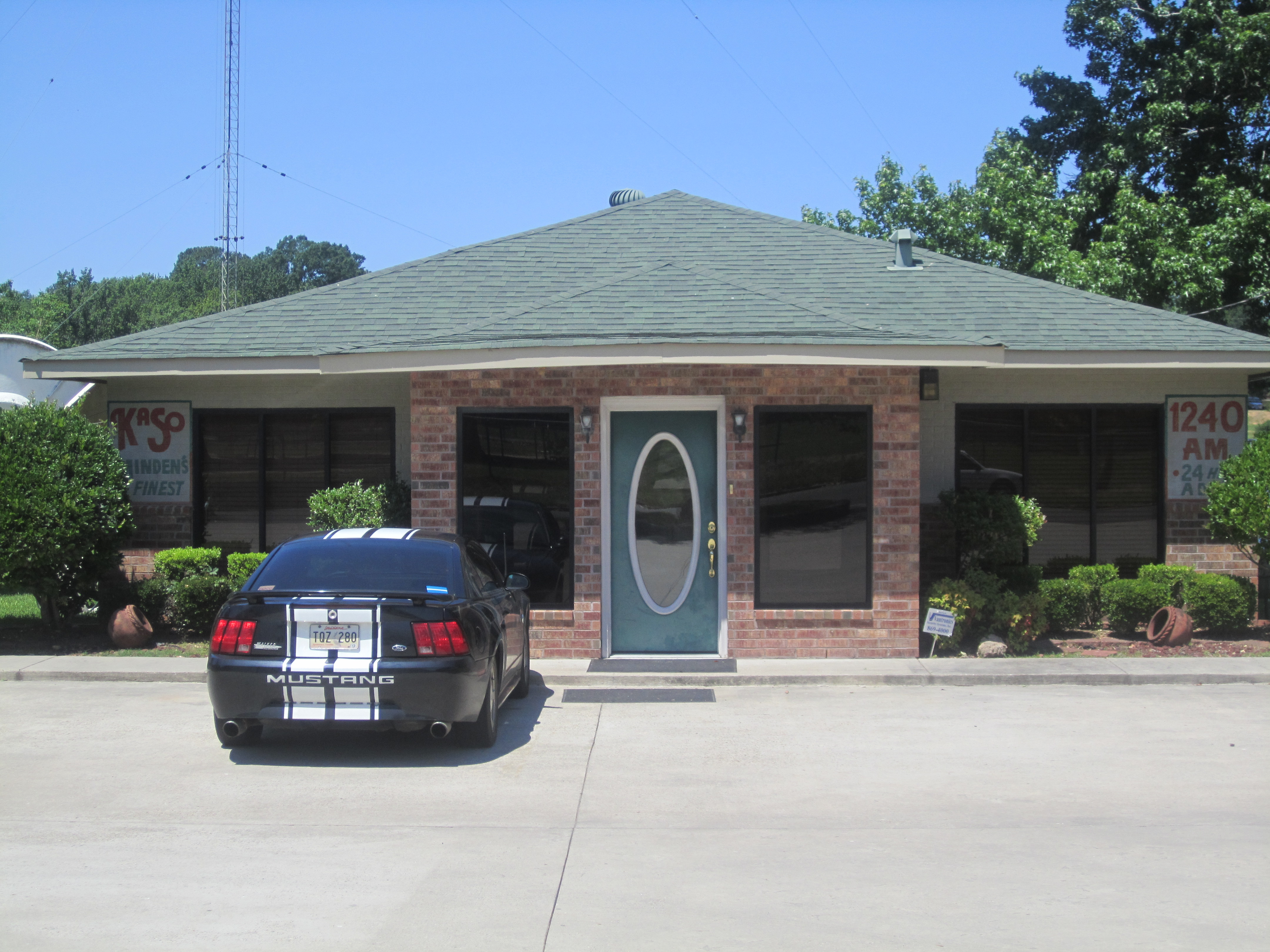
The KASO studio in Minden, Louisiana

For decades, it was owned by Harold Ray "Boe" Cook and Manoah Shadrach "Digger" O'Dell Jr. The two assumed management of KASO in 1961 and 1962, respectively, having come to Minden from Clovis, New Mexico. O'Dell also served four terms on the Webster Parish Police Jury, the parish governing body akin to the county commission in other states. The two were active in community affairs, and O'Dell himself was an accomplished golfer. The station for years stressed local news and offered regular community commentary under the title "Memories of Minden."

In 2013, Richard Chreene and Marvin Davis purchased KASO and sister station KBEF from Robert and Mary Whitaker, the previous owners. The transaction, at a price of $260,000, was consummated on October 23, 2013.

Previous logo
