= KWKH =

Radio station in Shreveport, Louisiana

Coordinates: 32°42′18″N 93°52′55″W

- Shreveport, Louisiana; United States
- Broadcast area: Shreveport–Bossier City metropolitan area
- Frequency: 1130 kHz
- Branding: 1130 The Tiger

Programming
- Language: English
- Format: Sports radio
- Affiliations: Fox Sports Radio

Ownership
- Owner: Townsquare Media; (Townsquare License, LLC)
- Sister stations: KEEL, KRUF, KTUX, KVKI-FM, KXKS-FM

History
- First air date: August 6, 1926
- Call sign meaning: W. K. Henderson (station founder)

Technical information
- Licensing authority: FCC
- Facility ID: 60266
- Class: A
- Power: 50,000 watts
- Translator: 103.3 K277DO (Shreveport)

Links
- Public license information: Public file; LMS
- Webcast: Listen live
- Website: kwkhonline.com

KWKH (1130 AM) is a sports radio station licensed to Shreveport, Louisiana. The 50-kilowatt station broadcasts at 1130 kHz. Formerly owned by Clear Channel Communications and Gap Central Broadcasting, it is now owned by Townsquare Media. KWKH serves the Shreveport–Bossier City metropolitan area. Its studios are shared with its other five sister stations on Westport Avenue in West Shreveport (one mile west of Shreveport Regional Airport), and the transmitter is a three-tower array in Belcher, Louisiana.

KWKH is no longer the local affiliate of the New Orleans Saints, but still broadcast the LSU Tigers (hence its nickname, "1130 The Tiger") as well as Fox Sports Radio. It is a 50,000-watt clear-channel station, one of two in Louisiana; the other being WWL in New Orleans. A single tower is used during the day, providing at least secondary coverage to most of northern Louisiana (as far east as Monroe and as far south as Alexandria, northeastern Texas and southwestern Arkansas. At night, power is fed to all three towers in a directional pattern to protect WBBR in New York City, the other Class A station on 1130 AM. Even with this restriction, KWKH can be heard across much of the central portion of North America at night.

== History ==
KWKH has a colorful history. It was founded by W. K. Henderson, owner of Henderson Iron Works and Supply Company, and native of Bastrop, Louisiana. Henderson signed KWKH on the air from his country estate at Kennonwood, north of Shreveport, in 1926, after selling his earlier venture into radio the year prior, which had also bore the call letters KWKH at the time. Henderson developed a celebrated on-air persona amongst the station's listenership, and a notorious reputation with government regulators. He often sparred with the Federal Radio Commission over his profanity-laced rants against chain stores and the United States government, as well as over his desire to operate the station in the manner he wished, using as much radiated power as he felt necessary. The broadcaster initially enjoyed the patronage of Governor Huey P. Long Jr., whose son, Russell B. Long, was born in 1918, in Shreveport. Ultimately, the outspoken Henderson lost Long's support and his radio license as well.

KWKH's future came into question in 1932, when Henderson filed for personal bankruptcy during the Depression. An article in the trade publication Broadcasting reported that the bankruptcy "may be made an issue at a hearing involving the KWKH license renewal to be held probably in February [1933]". Bowing to this pressure and at the advice of his attorneys, Henderson sold the station in September 1932, to International Broadcasting Corporation, a firm composed of local investors. At that time, KWKH operated nighttime on 850 kHz, the same frequency as WWL in New Orleans, Louisiana. WWL had applied for full-time status, and "a local insurance company" had applied for the 850 kHz frequency in Shreveport. Under this new ownership, KWKH became affiliated with the CBS network in 1934.

On May 28, 1935, the Federal Communications Commission approved transfer of ownership of KWKH to the Times Publishing Company Ltd. of Shreveport. Broadcasting magazine reported, "KWKH is listed as being assigned to 850 kc. with 10,000 watts, but with special authorization to operate on 1100 kc. unlimited time". The company simultaneously became the owner of KWEA in Shreveport, which operated on 1210 kHz with 100 watts (unlimited).

During World War II, KWKH broadcast a musical production, a medley of waltzes, foxtrots, and jazz songs, of the orchestra consisting of prisoners of war from nearby Camp Reston.

In April 1948, KWKH launched the Louisiana Hayride, a live country music show broadcast from the Municipal Auditorium in Shreveport. The successful show helped launch the careers of a number of important music artists. In the mid-1950s, KWKH was the first major radio station to feature the music of Elvis Presley on the Louisiana Hayride. Horace Logan, long-term KWKH Program Manager and originator of the "Hayride", and Frank Page introduced Presley on Hayride. The station carried games for the Shreveport Steamer during the 1974 World Football League season. Larry King was the color commentator for the Steamer games.

International Broadcasting Corporation sold KWKH in 1977, and the station's music format was changed to strictly country. Prior to the sale, KWKH maintained a full-service format – airing a variety of music, news, sports, farm reports, and other locally-produced programming.

On May 31, 2012, KWKH changed its format to sports, branded as The Tiger.

KWKH is a Federal Primary Entry Point station for the National Public Warning System and a Louisiana State Relay of the Emergency Alert System, and is in charge of The Shreveport Area EAS operations.

== Notable contributors ==
- Tom Rowland, former employee who became mayor of Cleveland, Tennessee
