= KLKL =

Radio station in Minden, Louisiana

Coordinates: 32°33′16.5″N 93°31′47.6″W

- Minden, Louisiana; United States
- Broadcast area: Shreveport–Bossier City metropolitan area
- Frequency: 95.7 MHz
- Branding: The River 95.7

Programming
- Language: English
- Format: Classic hits
- Affiliations: Dallas Cowboys Radio Network

Ownership
- Owner: Connoisseur Media; (Alpha Media Licensee LLC)
- Sister stations: KBTT; KDKS-FM; KOKA; KTAL-FM

History
- First air date: 1978

Technical information
- Licensing authority: FCC
- Facility ID: 13802
- Class: C2
- ERP: 50,000 watts
- HAAT: 143 meters (469 ft)

Links
- Public license information: Public file; LMS
- Webcast: Listen live
- Website: www.klkl.fm

KLKL (95.7 MHz, "The River 95.7") is an American radio station licensed to Minden, Louisiana. The station is broadcasting a classic hits format. The station serves the Shreveport–Bossier City metropolitan area. KLKL is owned by Connoisseur Media, through licensee Alpha Media Licensee LLC. Its studios are located just north of downtown Shreveport, and the transmitter is in Haughton, Louisiana.
