= KEEL =

Radio station in Shreveport, Louisiana

- Shreveport, Louisiana; United States
- Broadcast area: Shreveport–Bossier City metropolitan area
- Frequency: 710 kHz
- Branding: 101.7 FM & 710 KEEL

Programming
- Language: English
- Format: News/Talk
- Network: Fox News Radio
- Affiliations: Compass Media Networks; Premiere Networks; Radio America; Westwood One; Louisiana Tech athletics Dallas Cowboys Radio Network

Ownership
- Owner: Townsquare Media; (Townsquare License, LLC)
- Sister stations: KRUF, KTUX, KVKI-FM, KWKH, KXKS-FM

History
- First air date: May 19, 1922
- Former call signs: WDAN (1922); WGAQ (1922); KWKH (1925–1926); KSBA (1926–1929); KTBS (1929–1957)
- Call sign meaning: Pronounced Keel, part of a boat's hull

Technical information
- Licensing authority: FCC
- Facility ID: 46983
- Class: B
- Power: 50,000 watts (day); 5,000 watts (night)
- Transmitter coordinates: 32°41′00″N 93°51′33″W
- Translator: 101.7 K269GO (Shreveport)

Links
- Public license information: Public file; LMS
- Webcast: Listen live
- Website: 710keel.com

KEEL (710 AM, "101.7 FM & 710 KEEL") is a commercial radio station broadcasting a news/talk radio format. Licensed to Shreveport, Louisiana, it serves the Shreveport–Bossier City metropolitan area. The station is owned by Townsquare Media, sharing studios with five sister stations in West Shreveport, one mile west of Shreveport Regional Airport. Fox News updates are carried at the top of every hour.

By day, KEEL is powered at 50,000 watts, the maximum for commercial AM stations in the U.S. But because 710 AM is a clear channel frequency reserved for Class A stations WOR New York City and KIRO Seattle, KEEL must reduce power at night to 5,000 watts to avoid interference. It also uses a directional antenna at all times, with a four-tower array in the daytime and a six-tower array at night. The transmitter is on Haygood Road, near Interstate 49 in Dixie. Programming is also heard on 250-watt FM translator K269GO at 101.7 MHz.

== Programming ==
Weekdays on KEEL begin with The KEEL Morning Show with Mike Martindale and Erin McCarty. They're followed by The Moon Griffon Show, heard across Louisiana and based at KPEL-FM Lafayette. The rest of the schedule is nationally syndicated conservative talk programs: The Clay Travis and Buck Sexton Show, The Sean Hannity Show, The Mark Levin Show, The Dana Loesch Show, Coast to Coast AM with George Noory and This Morning, America's First News with Gordon Deal.

Weekends feature specialty shows on money, health, technology, home repair, guns, food and drink. Weekend programs include The Kim Komando Show, In The Garden with Ron Wilson, The Weekend with Michael Brown, Tom Gresham's Gun Talk and At Home with Gary Sullivan. Most hours begin with an update from Fox News Radio.

During the college football season, KEEL carries Louisiana Tech Bulldogs football games. Other Louisiana Tech teams are also heard. During the NFL season, KEEL also runs Dallas Cowboys football games.

== History ==
=== Early years ===
KEEL is among the oldest radio stations in Louisiana. Its original call sign was WDAN. It was licensed on May 19, 1922, to W.G. Patterson and Glenwood Radio Corporation, a Shreveport radio equipment dealer. The first broadcasts were made from Centenary College in Shreveport using a 10-watt transmitter. By July of the same year Patterson and his associates moved the station to a new location, increased power to 50 watts, and was assigned the call letters WGAQ. Local businessman W.K. Henderson became involved with the station, eventually gaining a controlling interest. In January 1925, Henderson relocated the transmitter site to his estate at Kennonwood, north of Shreveport. The station's call sign was changed to KWKH (not to be confused with the present-day KWKH, a separate station later started by Henderson in 1926 after he had sold interest in the former WGAQ). On August 14, 1926, W. G. Patterson and associates organized the Shreveport Broadcasting Association, purchasing the interest of W.K. Henderson in the station, and changing the call letters to KSBA. The station changed ownership again in 1929, and the call sign was changed to KTBS.

As KTBS, the station joined the NBC Red Network's Southwest group February 28, 1932, becoming the 88th station affiliated with NBC. It carried NBC's dramas, comedies, news and sports during the "Golden Age of Radio." At that time, KTBS was owned by Tristate Broadcasting System Inc. and broadcast on 1450 kHz with 1,000 watts of power. KTBS launched a television station, KTBS-TV (channel 3) in 1955, which remains under local ownership.

=== Gordon McLendon ===
KTBS sold its radio operations to the McLendon Group in 1957. The call letters were changed to the current KEEL, and the NBC affiliation was dropped. The sale brought a complete makeover of the station into a Top 40 format, in line with Gordon McLendon's other stations such as KLIF in Dallas and KILT in Houston.

KEEL enjoyed much improved ratings during this time. McLendon used contests, give-aways, jingles and public events to create excitement for the station's targeted youthful listeners.

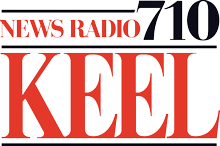
Logo before translator sign on

=== Marie Gifford Wright ===
A native of Cordell in Washita County in western Oklahoma, Marie Gifford (1917–2004), later Marie Wright, launched a career in radio in the 1940s in Oklahoma City. In 1945, she relocated to Shreveport and became the first woman manager of a local radio station. In 1962, she was named general manager of KEEL and KMBQ (formerly KEEL-FM, now KXKS-FM). From 1965 to 1975, she was vice president of LIN Broadcasting. When the company became the expanded and reorganized Multi-Media Broadcasting, with newspaper and television holdings as well as radio, Gifford continued in the vice presidency from 1975 to 1980.

In 1970, Gifford became the first woman to run for mayor of Shreveport. She campaigned on a platform of downtown revitalization and civil rights. She was defeated in the Democratic primary by municipal utilities commissioner Calhoun Allen, who then prevailed in the general election over the Republican mayoral choice, Edward Leo "Ed" McGuire Jr. (1914–1983), a Massachusetts native and a member of the Caddo Parish School Board.

In 1988, Wright was named recipient of the "Women Who Have Made a Difference" award. Former State Senator Virginia Shehee, who served with Wright on the boards of the Shreveport Symphony and the Strand Theatre, said that Wright's fight for equality had a major impact in Shreveport.

In 1979, Gifford married Harold Arthur Wright (1907–2012), an entrepreneur originally from Moultrie County in central Illinois, who owned the former Whatleys, Wills, and Wright appliance centers in Shreveport, Monroe, and Jackson, Mississippi.

=== Switch to MOR and Talk ===
In 1975, KEEL was acquired by Multimedia, Inc. By the late 1970s, many radio listeners were tuning to FM stations for hit music. This had an impact on KEEL. Multimedia moved the station to a full service radio format of middle of the road (MOR) music, news and sports. It became an affiliate of the ABC Information Radio Network.

Then as music listening all but ended on AM radio, KEEL eliminated the remaining music shows and switched to talk radio. It was acquired by Jacor Communications in 1998. In 2007, Jacor was merged into Clear Channel Communications, the forerunner to today's iHeartRadio. The Shreveport stations owned by iHeart were later spun off to Townsquare Media.

== See also ==
- List of initial AM-band station grants in the United States
