= KOKA =

Radio station in Shreveport, Louisiana

- Shreveport, Louisiana; United States
- Broadcast area: Shreveport–Bossier City metropolitan area
- Frequency: 980 kHz
- Branding: KOKA 980 AM, 93.3 FM

Programming
- Language: English
- Format: Urban gospel

Ownership
- Owner: Connoisseur Media; (Alpha Media Licensee LLC)
- Sister stations: KBTT; KDKS-FM; KLKL; KTAL-FM

History
- First air date: 1950
- Former call signs: KCIJ (1950–1957); KZEA (1957–1958); KOKA (1958–1962); KREB (1962–1963); KCIJ (1963–1989); KIOU (1989)

Technical information
- Licensing authority: FCC
- Facility ID: 9222
- Class: D
- Power: 5,000 watts (day); 79 watts (night)
- Transmitter coordinates: 32°31′34.5″N 93°49′19.6″W
- Translator: 93.3 K227CY (Shreveport)

Links
- Public license information: Public file; LMS
- Webcast: Listen live
- Website: www.koka.am

KOKA (980 kHz, "KOKA 980 AM, 93.3 FM") is an American radio station licensed to Shreveport, Louisiana. The station is broadcasting an urban gospel format. The station serves the Shreveport–Bossier City metropolitan area. The station is owned by Connoisseur Media, through licensee Alpha Media Licensee LLC. Its studios are located just north of downtown Shreveport, and the transmitter is north of Cross Lake.

== History ==
Former blues and gospel singer-songwriter Eddy Giles was a DJ at the station for 40 years. He was a gospel announcer, program director and music director.

== Notable personalities ==
- Barbara Norton, politician
