= KMJJ-FM =

Radio station in Shreveport, Louisiana

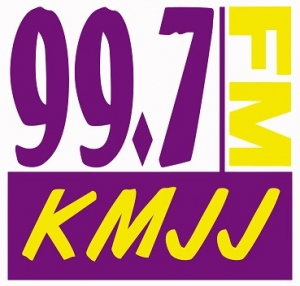
- Shreveport, Louisiana; United States
- Broadcast area: Shreveport–Bossier City metropolitan area
- Frequency: 99.7 MHz (HD Radio)
- Branding: 99.7 KMJJ

Programming
- Language: English
- Format: Urban contemporary
- Affiliations: Premiere Networks

Ownership
- Owner: Cumulus Media; (Cumulus Licensing LLC)
- Sister stations: KRMD-FM; KVMA-FM; KQHN

History
- First air date: 1978
- Former call signs: KCOZ (1978–1988)
- Former frequencies: 100.1 MHz (1978–1993)
- Call sign meaning: "Majic" (former branding)

Technical information
- Licensing authority: FCC
- Facility ID: 63929
- Class: C2
- ERP: 23,500 watts
- HAAT: 162.6 meters (533 ft)
- Transmitter coordinates: 32°29′36.5″N 93°45′55.6″W

Links
- Public license information: Public file; LMS
- Webcast: Listen live
- Website: www.997kmjj.com

KMJJ-FM (99.7 MHz, "99.7 KMJJ") is an American radio station with an urban contemporary format broadcasting in the Shreveport–Bossier City metropolitan area. The station is owned by Cumulus Media and is headquartered at the Louisiana Boardwalk shopping center in Bossier City, Louisiana. The station's transmitter is southwest of the I-20/I-49 interchange in Shreveport, on a Landmark non-supported structure, locally nicknamed "Eiffel Tower". It is co-located with those of KMJJ-FM and KQHN, as well as the KRMD-FM auxiliary transmitter.

== History ==
KMJJ was originally known as Majic FM 100 then on 100.1 FM debuting an urban format on August 1, 1988, flipping from easy listening KCOZ. It has been a heritage urban-formatted station since in the Shreveport-Bossier City. In April 1993 KMJJ moved to 99.7 FM and upgraded to 50,000 watts. In the years since it has gained competition from KDKS and KBTT; it gained format companionship in 2004 when KVMA-FM took to the air. Since January 2008, KMJJ is the syndicated home of Big Boy's Neighborhood, replacing the Doug Banks Morning Show.
