= KIOU =

Radio station in Shreveport, Louisiana

- Shreveport, Louisiana; United States
- Broadcast area: Shreveport–Bossier City metropolitan area
- Frequency: 1480 kHz

Programming
- Language: English
- Format: Christian radio

Ownership
- Owner: Capital City Radio Corporation

History
- First air date: August 26, 1954
- Former call signs: KLMB (1984–1988); KOKA (1988–1989)

Technical information
- Licensing authority: FCC
- Facility ID: 33714
- Class: D
- Power: 1,000 watts (day); 129 watts (night)
- Transmitter coordinates: 32°34′18″N 93°44′39″W
- Translator: 94.9 K235CQ (Shreveport)

Links
- Public license information: Public file; LMS
- Webcast: KIOU 1480 Listen live KIOU 94.7 Listen live
- Website: KIOU 1480 Online; KIOU 94.7 Online

KIOU (1480 kHz) is an American radio station broadcasting a Christian radio format. Licensed to Shreveport, Louisiana, the station serves the Shreveport–Bossier City metropolitan area. The station is currently owned by Capital City Radio Corporation.

== History ==
KIOU was first licensed on August 26, 1954 as KJOE. The station was assigned the callsign KLMB on December 1, 1984. On September 2, 1988, the station changed its callsign to KOKA and again on October 6, 1989 to KIOU.
