= KBDV =

Radio station in Leesville, Louisiana

- Leesville, Louisiana; United States
- Broadcast area: Leesville, DeRidder and surrounding areas
- Frequency: 92.7 MHz (HD Radio)
- Branding: Eagle 92.7

Programming
- Format: Adult contemporary
- Affiliations: Westwood One

Ownership
- Owner: BDC Radio; (Baldridge-Dumas Communications, Inc.)
- Sister stations: KDBH-FM, KVCL-FM, KZBL, KTHP, KTEZ, KWLV, KWLA

History
- First air date: January 14, 2008
- Call sign meaning: Baldridge-Dumas n Leesville

Technical information
- Licensing authority: FCC
- Facility ID: 170938
- Class: A
- ERP: 6,000 watts
- HAAT: 100 meters (330 ft)
- Transmitter coordinates: 31°7′7″N 93°11′12″W

Links
- Public license information: Public file; LMS
- Website: bdcradio.com

KBDV (92.7 MHz, "Eagle 92.7") is an American radio station broadcasting an adult contemporary music format. Licensed to Leesville, Louisiana, United States, the station is currently owned by Baldridge-Dumas Communications, Inc.

== History ==
The Federal Communications Commission issued a construction permit for the station on May 18, 2007. The station was assigned the KBDV call sign on January 14, 2008, and received its license to cover on September 18, 2008.
