= W. K. Henderson =

American broadcaster

- Born: August 6, 1880; Bastrop, Louisiana
- Died: May 28, 1945 (aged 64); Shreveport, Louisiana
- Other names: "Old Man" Henderson, "Mistah Will" Henderson
- Education: St. Edward's University
- Occupations: Businessman, radio personality
- Spouse: Josie Carter

William Kennon Henderson Jr. (August 6, 1880 – May 28, 1945) was an American businessman and radio personality. He broadcast on, owned, and operated the Northern Louisiana radio station KWKH from 1925 to 1933.

== Early life ==
W. K. Henderson was born in Bastrop, Louisiana to parents William Kennon Henderson Sr. and Mamie Jamison. His family moved to Jefferson, Texas and he was educated at St. Edward's University in Austin. In 1896, they moved to Shreveport, Louisiana, where Henderson Sr. owned the Henderson Iron Works and Supply Company. When W. K. Henderson Sr. died in 1918, Henderson Jr. became the owner of the company.

During World War I, Henderson befriended Huey Long, who came to represent Henderson is business affairs. He was one of Long's earliest benefactors, donating $10,000 to Long's unsuccessful 1924 campaign for governor of Louisiana.

== Career ==
In 1924, Henderson purchased the controlling share in W. G. Patterson's Shreveport radio station WGAQ. In 1925, he built a transmitter and radio studio at his estate of Kennonwood, 18 miles north of Shreveport and changed the call sign of WGAQ to KWKH, based on his own initials. In 1926, he sold the station license back to a group including W. G. Patterson. He started a new station, keeping the call sign KWKH.

Henderson could be considered an early disc jockey who played records upon request by listeners. KWKH grew popular because of the music request system and also Henderson's rustic broadcasting style. His raspy voice earned him the nickname "Old Man" Henderson.

In 1927, Henderson broadcast KWKH at a power of three kilowatts, far more than the one kilowatt power allocated by the Federal Radio Commission to KWKH, greatly increasing the coverage of the station throughout the central United States. The Federal Radio Commission never prosecuted Henderson for this violation.

=== Anti-chain-store activism ===
In October 1929, KWKH broadcast a speech by Shreveport banker Philip Lieber in which he blamed chain stores for putting local retailers out of business. Henderson was clearly swayed by the speech and Henderson's broadcasts on KWKH became entirely focused on opposing chain stores.

Henderson created an organization called the Merchants' Minute Men Association, composed of local independent store owners. Despite the expensive dues of $12, by September 1930 there were 32,000 nationwide members of the Minute Men. A national convention was held in Shreveport in October 1930, with Henderson's friend Governor Huey Long in attendance.

=== Bankruptcy ===
During the Great Depression, Henderson's businesses failed. The Henderson Iron Works and Supply Co. was placed under receivership and in November 1932 Henderson filed for personal bankruptcy, listing liabilities of $1,381,596. On September 25, 1932, Henderson sold his shares of KWKH for $50,000.
