= KDBH-FM =

Radio station in Natchitoches, Louisiana

- Natchitoches, Louisiana; United States
- Broadcast area: Natchitoches, Louisiana; Fairview Alpha, Louisiana
- Frequency: 97.5 MHz
- Branding: Country Legends 97.5

Programming
- Language: English
- Format: Classic country

Ownership
- Owner: BDC Radio; (Baldridge-Dumas Communications, Inc.)
- Sister stations: KZBL, KWLV, KTEZ, KVCL-FM, KTHP, KBDV, KWLA

History
- Former call signs: KNOC-FM (1965–1971)

Technical information
- Licensing authority: FCC
- Facility ID: 8519
- Class: A
- ERP: 6,000 watts
- HAAT: 67 meters (220 ft)
- Transmitter coordinates: 31°48′17″N 93°01′27″W

Links
- Public license information: Public file; LMS
- Website: KDBH Online

KDBH-FM (97.5 FM, "Country Legends 97.5") is an American radio station broadcasting a classic country music format. Licensed to Natchitoches, Louisiana, United States, the station serves Natchitoches Parish and surrounding areas from a studio located in Natchitoches. The station is owned by Baldridge-Dumas Communications, Inc. The station broadcasts using the Westwood One Classic Country format.

== History ==
KNOC-FM went on the air in 1965. It broadcast with 3,000 watts at 97.7 MHz and was owned by the Natchitoches Broadcasting Company. The station became KDBH-FM on October 1, 1971.

In 2001, the station was approved for a power increase to 25,000 watts, with a frequency change to 97.3 MHz. It stayed until an agreement was made with Cumulus Media, to downgrade coverage once again to a class A station with 6,000 watts and move to 97.5 MHz, to allow for the positioning of station KQHN FM on 97.3 MHz in the Shreveport, Louisiana radio market; KQHN had been ordered in January 2005 to relocate from 107.9 MHz due to interference to navigational equipment at Barksdale Air Force Base. In 2015, KDBH-FM returned to an upgraded Class C3 facility on 97.5.

On May 1, 2017, KDBH-FM changed its format to classic country, branded as "Country Legends 97.5".
