= KTEZ =

- Zwolle, Louisiana; United States
- Broadcast area: Sabine Parish; Natchitoches Parish
- Frequency: 99.9 MHz
- Branding: Easy 99.9

Programming
- Language: English
- Format: Adult contemporary
- Affiliations: Westwood One

Ownership
- Owner: Baldridge-Dumas Communications, Inc.
- Sister stations: KWLV, KVCL-FM, KTHP, KBDV, KDBH-FM, KZBL, KWLA

History
- First air date: 1990; 36 years ago
- Former call signs: KGRI (04/10/1998-05/07/2002)
- Call sign meaning: K-T-Easy-Zwolle

Technical information
- Licensing authority: FCC
- Facility ID: 86142
- Class: A
- ERP: 6,000 watts
- HAAT: 100 meters (330 ft)
- Transmitter coordinates: 31°39′17.00″N 93°29′4.00″W

Links
- Public license information: Public file; LMS
- Website: bdcradio.com

KTEZ (99.9 MHz, "Easy 99.9") is an American radio station broadcasting an adult contemporary music format. Licensed to Zwolle, Louisiana, United States, the station is currently owned by Baldridge-Dumas Communications, Inc. and features programming from Westwood One.

The call letters KTEZ were formerly assigned to 101.1 FM Lubbock Texas, now KONE FM, from 1974 to 2001.
