= KWLV =

- Many, Louisiana; United States
- Broadcast area: Sabine Parish; Natchitoches, Louisiana
- Frequency: 107.1 MHz
- Branding: 107.1 KWLV

Programming
- Language: English
- Format: Country
- Affiliations: Westwood One

Ownership
- Owner: Baldridge-Dumas Communications, Inc.
- Sister stations: KZBL, KDBH-FM, KTEZ, KVCL-FM, KTHP, KWLA, KBDV

History
- First air date: November 1978

Technical information
- Licensing authority: FCC
- Facility ID: 73236
- Class: C3
- ERP: 25,000 watts
- HAAT: 77 meters (253 ft)
- Transmitter coordinates: 31°36′27.00″N 93°24′05.00″W

Links
- Public license information: Public file; LMS
- Webcast: Listen live
- Website: KWLV website

KWLV (107.1 MHz, "107.1 KWLV") is an American radio station broadcasting a country music format. Licensed to Many, Louisiana, United States, the station serves Sabine Parish and surrounding areas from a studio located in Many, Louisiana. The station is currently owned by Baldridge-Dumas Communications, Inc .

== History ==
According to the station's website, the station was started in November 1978.
