= KZBL =

Radio station in Natchitoches, Louisiana

- Natchitoches, Louisiana; United States
- Broadcast area: Natchitoches Parish
- Frequency: 100.7 MHz
- Branding: 100.7 KZBL

Programming
- Language: English
- Format: Oldies
- Affiliations: Westwood One

Ownership
- Owner: BDC Radio; (Baldridge-Dumas Communications, Inc.)
- Sister stations: KDBH-FM, KWLV, KTEZ, KTHP, KVCL-FM, KBDV, KWLA

History
- First air date: 1986

Technical information
- Licensing authority: FCC
- Facility ID: 7824
- Class: C3
- ERP: 25,000 watts
- HAAT: 84 meters (276 ft)
- Transmitter coordinates: 31°48′17.00″N 93°01′27.00″W

Links
- Public license information: Public file; LMS
- Website: kzblradio.com

KZBL (100.7 MHz, "100.7 KZBL") is an American radio station broadcasting an oldies music format. Licensed to Natchitoches, Louisiana, United States, the station serves Natchitoches Parish and surrounding areas from a studio located in Downtown Natchitoches and its transmitter is in Clarence. The station is owned by Baldridge-Dumas Communications, Inc.

== Website ==
KZBL's website, www.kzblradio.com, was established in May, 2010. It offers local weather conditions, world, state, and local news, events, and sports. KZBL also offers live streaming audio of its programming, which began in October 2010. KZBL's website also promotes its sister station, KDBH 97.5 FM.

== History ==
KZBL started in 1986 as a 3,000 watt station near where it is located today. The station upgraded in power to its present 25,000 watts in 1999 before being sold to its current owners. The station applied for and received an allowance to move up the tower 9 meters (from 75 to 84 meters) in 2002 to help in coverage area.
