= Bert Sperling =

American writer

Bert T. Sperling
- Born: Brooklyn, New York
- Education: B.S. Engineering
- Alma mater: Oregon State University
- Occupations: Author; Demographer; Software Programmer; Public Speaker; Consultant
- Writing career
- Notable works: "Cities Ranked & Rated" "Best Places to Raise Your Family"
- Website: www.bertsperling.com

Bertrand T. Sperling was born in 1950 in Brooklyn, New York. He is an author and researcher. His books and studies on quality of life in America have made him "an internationally recognized expert in cities."

== Work ==
=== Studies ===
Sperling is commissioned to carry out demographic studies which highlight a particular aspect of American life. Past studies have included "Funnest Cities to Live", "Best Cities for Singles", "Best Cities to Retire", and "Best Cities for Women’s Health".

=== Books ===
In 2004, Sperling released the 832-page Cities Ranked and Rated, co-authored by Peter Sander and published by John Wiley and Sons. Sperling and Sander appeared on The Today Show in support of the book.

The 864-page Second Edition of Cities Ranked and Rated was published in 2007.

The 464-page Best Places to Raise Your Family was released in 2006 and again co-authored by Sander.

=== Bestplaces.net ===
Sperling's interactive "Places, U.S.A." computer program evolved into the Sperling's BestPlaces (BestPlaces.net) website. Using quarterly-updated statistics from dozens of sources, the site is a free resource for people across the country seeking to relocate. The site is also used as a recreational learning tool and academic reference.

== In popular culture ==
Sperling has been a guest on the Today Show and featured in The New York Times. The results of his studies have been mentioned in "The Simpsons" animated TV show, "The Tonight Show", as well as in clues in the popular trivia game show "Jeopardy!"

== Controversy ==
The Simpsons episode "They Saved Lisa’s Brain" (Season 10, Episode 22) generated controversy for its mention of East St. Louis, Illinois as America's least livable city.

In the episode, Comic Book Guy announces that Springfield is 299th on a list of the United States' 300 most livable cities. East St. Louis is in last place. A journalist for a "local East St Louis [news]paper" noticed this, and called writer Matt Selman to ask him why they were "taking a shot at East St Louis." Selman jokingly replied: "because it's a crack-ridden slum." The Simpsons staff received several angry letters from East St Louis' residents, demanding an apology.

== Career ==
Sperling founded Dataccount in the early 1980s, a company specializing in model-specific software for the emerging laptop market. For example, he entered the United States Tax Code into programmable calculators, which were then used by tax professionals for estate planning.

Sperling was quoted in the May 7, 1984 issue of InfoWorld magazine for this expertise on portable computer programming. InfoWorld also turned to Sperling for his insight on the downfall of early laptop manufacturer Gavilan Computer in the magazine's December 3, 1984 issue.

Sperling started Fast Forward, Inc. in 1984 and wrote an interactive software program called "Places USA." It was the first application of its kind, allowing users to weigh their own criteria for what kind of lifestyle, amenities and demographic features were important for them. It then used these criteria and weightings to produce a list of the user's ideal place to live, from a pool of the 300 largest metropolitan areas (MSA's) in the U.S.

An article featuring the "Places USA" program appeared in the newspaper USA Today. In 1987 the editors of Money Magazine discovered his work and they commissioned him to compile their "Best Cities" lists. He continued to author these Money lists for nearly 20 years.

Sperling served as a consultant to author William G. Zikmund in the writing of the 1989 book Exploring Marketing Research.

The "Places USA" software application continued to be used by researchers as late as 1996, when William Seavey cited the program in his book Moving to Small Town America.

== Quotes about Sperling ==
Richard Florida, professor at University of Toronto and head of the Rotman School of Management Martin Prosperity Institute said, "you need information based on life stage, job and a cluster and bundle of amenities, such as schools, health care, culture," adding that Sperling "tends to be good at assessing most, if not all, of that."

Thomas Wetzel, president of the Retirement Living Information Center in Redding, Connecticut believes the BestPlaces.net website is "the only one that does the comparisons people are looking for."

== Data Sources ==
For the Bestplaces.net website, as well as the rankings in his books and media studies, Sperling uses a wide variety of data sources. Most of this data is public domain and compiled by government organizations, providing objectivity and third-party accountability.

Sources include the U.S. Census Bureau, the FBI, the Centers for Disease Control and Prevention, the Bureau of Labor Statistics, the National Oceanic and Atmospheric Administration, and the U.S. Department of Health and Human Services.

== Personal life ==
Sperling lived in Brooklyn for about a year following his birth. He grew up in San Diego, Oslo, Norway, Key West, Florida, and Carmel, California.

He graduated from Oregon State University in 1974 with a degree in engineering. He was recently featured in an article in his alma mater's alumni magazine.
