= KVMA-FM =

Radio station in Shreveport, Louisiana

- Shreveport, Louisiana; United States
- Broadcast area: Shreveport–Bossier City metropolitan area
- Frequency: 102.9 MHz (HD Radio)
- Branding: Magic 102.9

Programming
- Language: English
- Format: Urban adult contemporary
- Affiliations: Compass Media Networks; Premiere Networks

Ownership
- Owner: Cumulus Media; (Cumulus Licensing LLC)
- Sister stations: KMJJ-FM; KQHN; KRMD-FM

History
- First air date: 2000
- Former call signs: KBED (1998–2005)
- Call sign meaning: "Voice of Magnolia" (in reference to original city of license, Magnolia, Arkansas)

Technical information
- Licensing authority: FCC
- Facility ID: 53030
- Class: C2
- ERP: 42,000 watts
- HAAT: 163 meters (535 ft)
- Transmitter coordinates: 32°29′36.5″N 93°45′55.6″W

Links
- Public license information: Public file; LMS
- Webcast: Listen liveListen live (via iHeartRadio)
- Website: www.magic1029fm.com

KVMA-FM (102.9 MHz, "Magic 102.9") is an American urban adult contemporary formatted radio station licensed to Shreveport, Louisiana, United States, and serving the Shreveport–Bossier City metropolitan area. The station is owned by Cumulus Media and based at the Louisiana Boardwalk in Bossier City.

KVMA-FM was purchased in 2004 from Magnolia, Arkansas, and relocated to the Shreveport Market on 107.9 MHz with Cumulus Broadcasting. In 2005, a short discussion between the Federal Communications Commission (FCC), Barksdale Air Force Base and Cumulus Broadcasting over the interference of 107.9 and the B52 Aircraft, the FCC shut down the 107.9 frequency in the Shreveport/Bossier area. Cumulus Broadcasting relocated KVMA-FM's format to 102.9, replacing KBED-FM (Mix 102.9 FM). KVMA-FM picked up the syndication rights to the Dede In The Morning. It is also the home of The D.L. Hughley Show in the afternoons, and The Sweat Hotel at nights. KBED-FM is now KQHN and was relicensed to 97.3 and serves the Ark-La-Tex area.

KVMA-FM's transmitter facilities are located near Downtown Shreveport on a Landmark non-supported structure, locally nicknamed "Eiffel Tower". It is co-located with those of KMJJ-FM and KQHN, as well as the KRMD-FM auxiliary transmitter.
