= KVCL-FM =

- Winnfield, Louisiana; United States
- Broadcast area: Winn Parish, Louisiana
- Frequency: 92.1 MHz
- Branding: Hometown Radio

Programming
- Format: Country

Ownership
- Owner: Baldridge-Dumas Communications, Inc.
- Sister stations: KDBH-FM, KTHP, KZBL, KBDV, KTEZ, KWLV, KWLA

History
- Call sign meaning: Kilowatt Voice Central Louisiana

Technical information
- Licensing authority: FCC
- Facility ID: 26233
- Class: A
- ERP: 6,000 watts
- HAAT: 64 meters (210 ft)
- Transmitter coordinates: 31.94850°N 92.62708°W

Links
- Public license information: Public file; LMS
- Webcast: Listen live
- Website: kvclradio.com

KVCL-FM (92.1 MHz, Hometown Radio) is an American radio station licensed to Winnfield, Louisiana. The station broadcasts a country music format and is owned by Baldridge-Dumas Communications, Inc. The station transmitter and studio is located in Winnfield.
