= Louisiana Boardwalk =

Coordinates: 32.5190°N 93.7407°W

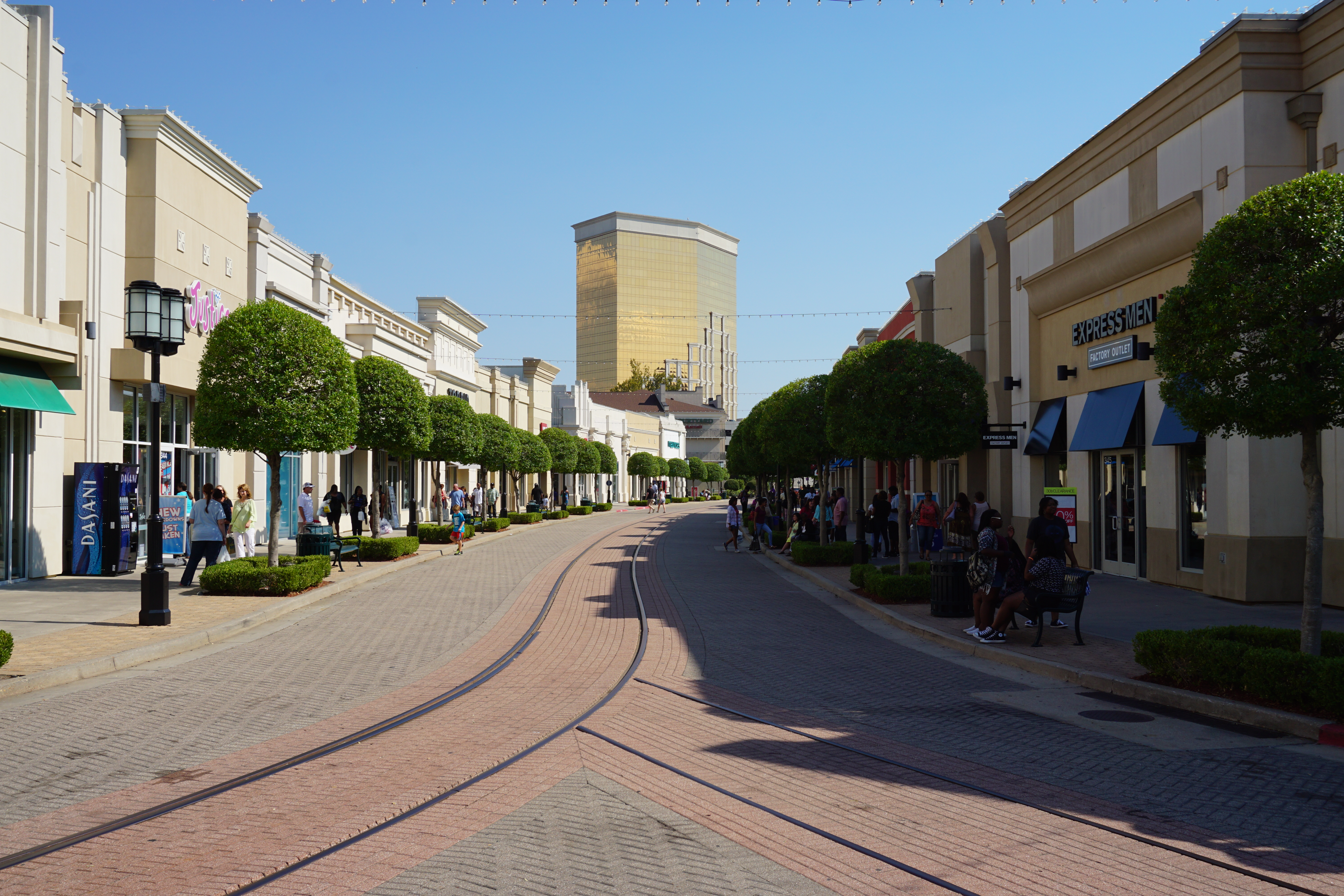
- Location: 540 Boardwalk Boulevard, Bossier, Louisiana - LA 71111
- Opened: May 2005 (21 years ago)
- Developer: Urban Retail
- Owner: Urban Retail
- Num. of stores: 52
- Floor area: 500,000 square feet (46,000 m^{2})
- Website: louisianaboardwalk.com

The Louisiana Boardwalk Outlets is an outdoor shopping center combining retail shopping, restaurants, and entertainment. It is located in Bossier City, Louisiana, between the Horseshoe Bossier City and Margaritaville Resort Casino. It is one of the largest outlet malls in Louisiana.

Tenants at the 500,000 square foot (51,000 m^{2}) complex, which opened in May 2005, include Regal Cinemas, Cumulus Broadcasting Studios, Bass Pro Shops, Banana Republic, Justice, and Build-A-Bear Workshop. In addition, there are outlet stores owned by Haggar. There are more than fifty outlet stores, retail stores, restaurants and IMAX.

On March 30, 2008, Louisiana Boardwalk put a curfew in effect. No one under 16 is allowed after 8 p.m. unless accompanied by a parent or guardian.

Louisiana Boardwalk provides a sales tax refund on purchases up to $500 in cash and over $500 by check. Some recent store openings include Under Armour, Rocket Fizz, Express, Pepper Palace and Dollar Tree. The property boasts some of the best restaurants in the area including Hooters, Joe's Crab Shack, Fuddruckers, Sushiko, Saltgrass Steakhouse and IHOP.

After the COVID-19 crisis, customer attendance levels dropped significantly and stores began closing. As of May 2023, many tenants have closed their doors, Nike being the most notable one.
