= Shreveport Regional Airport =

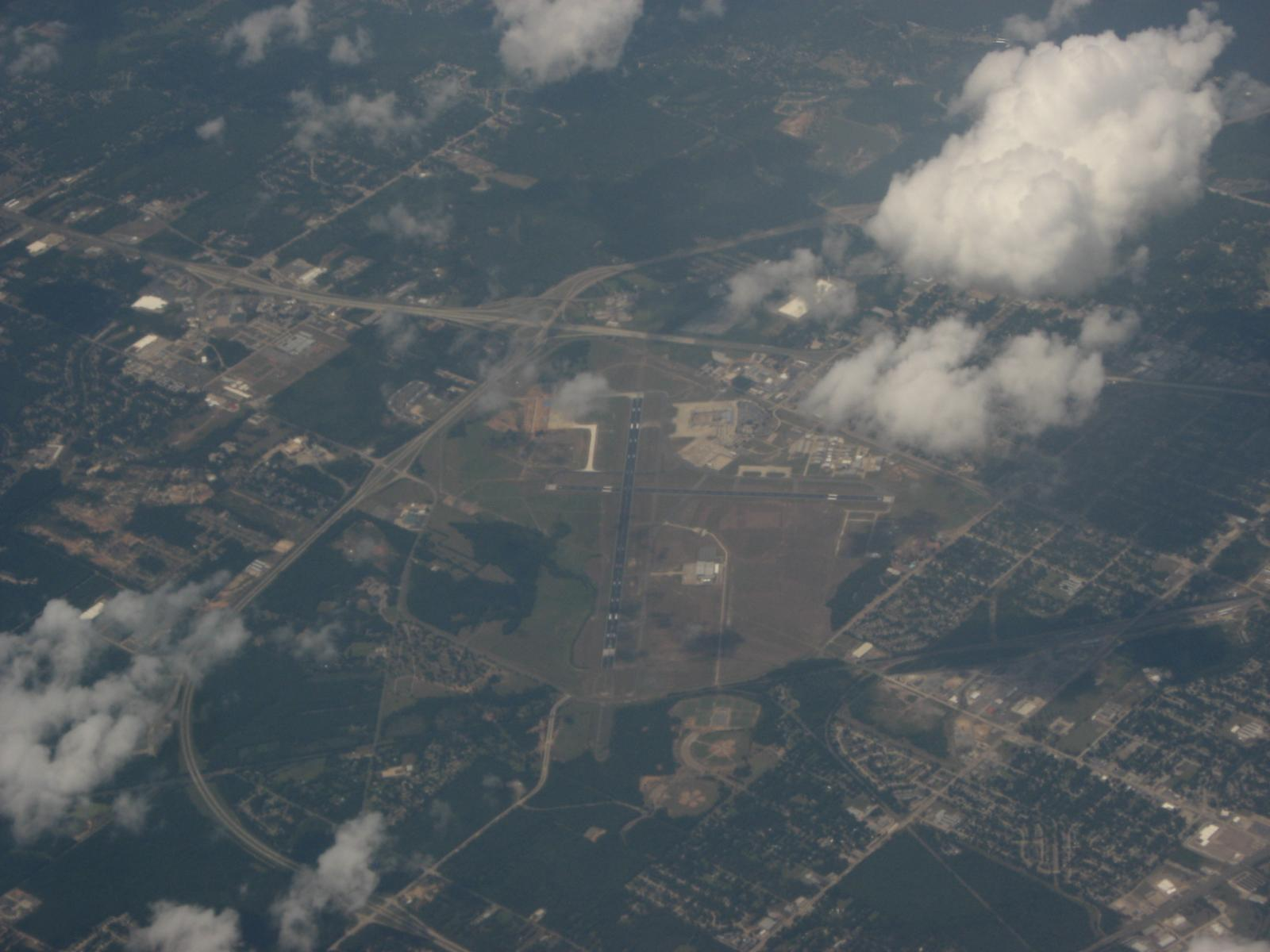
- IATA: SHV; ICAO: KSHV; FAA LID: SHV

Summary
- Airport type: Public
- Owner: City of Shreveport
- Operator: Shreveport Airport Authority
- Serves: Shreveport and Bossier City
- Location: Shreveport, Louisiana
- Elevation AMSL: 258 ft (79 m)
- Coordinates: 32°26′48″N 093°49′32″W
- Website: flyshreveport.com

Maps
- FAA airport diagram
- Interactive map of Shreveport Regional Airport

Runways
Direction	Length		Surface
Direction	ft	m	Surface
14/32	8,348	2,544	Asphalt
6/24	7,002	2,134	Asphalt

Statistics (2025)
- Total Passengers: 800,135
- Total cargo (pounds): 45,928,642 (2015)
- Based aircraft (2021): 62
- Airport operations: 32,387
- Source: Federal Aviation Administration, Shreveport Airport Authority, Airport IQ 5010

Shreveport Regional Airport (IATA: SHV, ICAO: KSHV, FAA LID: SHV) is a public use airport in Shreveport, Louisiana, United States. It is operated by the Shreveport Airport Authority which is chartered by the City of Shreveport. The airport is located four nautical miles (7 km) southwest of its central business district.

The airport's runways and terminal are visible to traffic along Interstate 20, a main east–west corridor of the Southern United States. Shreveport Regional was designed to replace the Shreveport Downtown Airport, which limited growth due to its close proximity of the Red River.

The airport had 800,135 passengers in calendar year 2025. According to the FAA's National Plan of Integrated Airport Systems, it is a primary commercial service airport.

The FAA classifies Shreveport Regional Airport as a "Small Hub" airport. For the 2018 calendar year, Shreveport Regional Airport ranked just under Mobile Regional Airport (Mobile, Alabama) and Augusta Regional Airport (Augusta, Georgia) and just above Grand Canyon National Park Airport (Grand Canyon, Arizona) and Aspen-Pitkin County Airport (Aspen, Colorado) in total enplanements.

== History ==
Historically, Shreveport was served by a number of airlines operating mainline jet service. Delta Air Lines was a major player at the airport for many years as Shreveport was a "focus city" and mini-hub for this air carrier. According to the February 1, 1976, edition of the Official Airline Guide (OAG), Delta was operating thirty-three (33) flights a day with Boeing 727-200 and McDonnell Douglas DC-9-30 jetliners from Shreveport. The December 15, 1979, Delta timetable lists ten (10) daily direct, no change of plane and nonstop jet services to Atlanta as well as daily nonstop jet flights to Dallas/Fort Worth, Houston, Little Rock, Birmingham, AL, Jackson, MS, Memphis, New Orleans, and Baton Rouge. This Delta timetable also lists one-stop, no change of plane direct jet service from Shreveport to New York–La Guardia Airport, Los Angeles, San Francisco, National (now known as Reagan National) Airport in Washington, D.C., Phoenix, Denver, Chicago, and St. Louis. Delta later operated Boeing 737 and McDonnell Douglas MD-80 jetliners from the airport as well. Northwest Airlines flew Douglas DC-9 jets nonstop to Memphis. Trans World Airlines (TWA) served the airport as well with Douglas DC-9 jet service to St. Louis. Other airlines that previously served Shreveport included the original Braniff International flying British Aircraft Corporation BAC One-Eleven jets followed by Boeing 727-200 jetliners nonstop to New Orleans and Fort Smith, AR, and also direct to Kansas City, Tulsa, Chicago and Minneapolis/St Paul. The original Frontier Airlines (1950-1986) also served Shreveport and operated Boeing 737-200 jetliners nonstop to Dallas/Fort Worth with direct, one-stop service to Denver. In the late 1970s Texas International Airlines serviced Shreveport with daily flights between Dallas and Texarkana using Convair 600 aircraft. In later years, American Airlines flew Boeing 727-200 and McDonnell Douglas MD-80 jet service nonstop to Dallas/Fort Worth while Continental Airlines operated Douglas DC-9 jets on nonstop flights to Houston. Now defunct Royale Airlines, a regional airline, was based at the Shreveport Regional Airport from 1962 until 1989. It served 23 cities in Louisiana, Texas, Mississippi and Florida using Embraer EMB-110 Bandeirante, Beechcraft Model 99, Short 330, Grumman Gulfstream I and de Havilland Canada DHC-6 Twin Otter turboprops as well as Douglas DC-9-10 jetliners.

== Facilities and aircraft ==
Shreveport Regional Airport covers an area of 1,625 acres (658 ha) at an elevation of 258 feet (79 m) above mean sea level. It has two asphalt paved runways: 14/32 is 8,348 by 200 feet (2,544 x 61 m) and 6/24 is 7,002 by 150 feet (2,134 × 46 m). The airport is located off Hollywood Avenue with access to Interstate 20. Shreveport Public Works Commissioner H. Lane Mitchell was a major figure in campaigning to have the airport located on Hollywood Ave.

In 2009, the airport opened a $30 million cargo terminal, which serves as an anchor for the Aero Park Industrial Park. Cargo tenants include United Parcel Service, FedEx, Integrated Airline Solutions, USA Jet, and Empire Airlines.

In 2018, the TSA security checkpoint was consolidated into a single location, allowing passengers to visit both concourses without having to go through screening. The airport is also an alternate destination for American Airlines flights that cannot land at Dallas-Fort Worth Int'l and United Airlines that cannot land at Houston Intercontinental Airport due to bad weather. In June 2017, regional feeder ExpressJet Airlines closed their Shreveport-based Embraer regional jet aircraft maintenance hangar.

In 2018, Western Global Airlines created a consolidated maintenance center at Shreveport Regional to serve its growing fleet of 16 Boeing 747 and McDonnell-Douglas MD-11 aircraft. The airline moved into the former Expressjet facilities. The airline cited Shreveport's central location as the reason for the airport being selected. The facility took in its first Boeing 747 on August 17, 2018.

In 2024, new restaurants and retail option began opening. Former local favorite Mexican restaurant Tacomania Cantina and national brand Coffee Bean & Tea Leaf opened in the TSA Checkpoint Atrium. Notini's Italian and a smaller Coffee Bean & Tea Leaf location opened on Concourse B across from Gate 5. A Great Raft Tap Room and a Coffee Bean & Tea Leaf location are located on Concourse C across from Gate 3. A new retail store, the 318 Forum Travel Shop, opened in the TSA Checkpoint Atrium, and features Louisiana themed gift items, snacks, drinks, and grab-and-go food options.

== Airlines and destinations ==
Currently, most airline services from Shreveport are flown with regional jet aircraft with the exception of flights operated by Allegiant Air which are operated with Airbus A320 Family jetliners. Delta Connection flies nonstop to Atlanta with Canadair CRJ-700 and CRJ-900 regional jets on behalf of Delta. American Eagle operating on behalf of American Airlines began flying four daily nonstop flights with Embraer E175 and Canadair CRJ 700 and CRJ 900 regional jet aircraft featuring first class and coach cabin service to Dallas/Fort Worth (DFW). American Eagle also operates Embraer ERJ-145 regional jets to DFW and CRJ-700 aircraft to Charlotte. United Express flights to Denver (DEN) are operated with ERJ-175 aircraft and flights to Houston (IAH) are operated with ERJ-145 aircraft.

=== Passenger ===
Airlines	Destinations
Allegiant Air	Gulf Shores (begins May 20, 2027), Las Vegas, Orlando/Sanford
American Eagle	Charlotte, Dallas/Fort Worth
Delta Connection	Atlanta
United Express	Chicago–O'Hare, Denver, Houston–Intercontinental

=== Destinations map ===
Destinations map (passenger service)
Destinations
Red = Year-round destination
Green = Seasonal destination
Blue = Future destination

== Statistics ==
=== Annual traffic ===
Annual passenger travel (enplanements + deplanements) at SHV, 2009–present:

Year	Enplanements	Deplanements	Total passenger travel	Gain/loss
2009	254,737	252,716	507,453	Unavailable
2010	253,616	251,910	505,526	-0.38%
2011	280,046	277,153	557,199	+10.22%
2012	290,200	278,414	568,614	+2.05%
2013	292,986	292,820	585,806	+2.15%
2014	318,513	315,397	633,910	+8.31%
2015	305,061	307,506	612,567	-3.45%
2016	287,978	286,357	574,335	-5.45%
2017	291,447	279,730	561,177	-1.88%
2018	315,803	313,506	629,309	+12.14%
2019	345,718	337,780	683,497	+8.61%
2020	160,793	159,427	320,220	-53.15%
2021	255,414	248,907	504,321	+57.49%
2022	281,976	277,057	559,033	+10.85%
2023	317,076	310,662	627,738	+12.29%
2024	362,959	352,574	715,533	+13.99%
2025	403,535	396,600	800,135	+11.82%

=== Top destinations ===
Busiest domestic non-stop routes from SHV (August 2025 – July 2026)
Rank	City	Passengers	Airlines
1	Dallas/Fort Worth, Texas	109,460	American
2	Atlanta, Georgia	97,070	Delta
3	Houston, Texas	70,870	United
4	Charlotte, North Carolina	42,440	American
5	Denver, Colorado	27,020	United
6	Las Vegas, Nevada	13,980	Allegiant
7	Destin/Fort Walton Beach, Florida	3,560	Allegiant
8	Orlando/Sanford, Florida	3,180	Allegiant
9	Nashville, Tennessee	2,800	Allegiant

== Airport operations and services ==
For the 12-month period ending December 31, 2021, the airport had 32,563 aircraft operations, an average of 89 per day: 25% air taxi, 37% general aviation, 30% air carrier and 8% military. At that time there were 62 aircraft based at this airport: 22 single-engine, 14 multi-engine, 24 jet and 2 helicopter.

Based aircraft (as of December 31, 2021)
Type	Fleet
Single engine (SE)	22
Multi-engine (ME)	14
Jet (J)	24
Total fixed wing (SE + ME + J)	60
Helicopters	2
Gliders	0
Military	0

=== Ground transportation service ===
The Shreveport Regional Airport has many options for transportation to and from the airport.

SPORTRAN, Shreveport-Bossier's public bus system, operates bus service between Shreveport Regional Airport and various locations in Shreveport. Bus routes 7, 13, and 108 serve the airport. The service has been free since 2022.

== The arts and the airport ==
=== Art at the Airport (Artport) ===
In 1990, the Airport Beautification Committee began a campaign to bring art and media to the Shreveport Regional Airport. Paintings, photographs, and projects by local school children decorate the lobby, hallways, and terminals of the airport. Officially known as Artport, the campaign declares itself "the only revolving public art display located in an airport setting in America, Artport features artwork from over 100 local and regional artists".

The Airport Beautification Committee hosts an annual gala-style event at the Shreveport Regional Airport showcasing local artists and raising funds for the program.

=== Louisiana film industry ===
Since Hurricane Katrina devastated much of New Orleans and south Louisiana in 2005, Shreveport has been home to the booming film industry in Louisiana. With production companies shooting films all over north Louisiana, the Shreveport Regional has seen growth in flights, passengers, air cargo operations, and even filming at the airport itself.

Requests can be made to film at the Shreveport Regional Airport. The airport boasts that it is "a proud supporter of the Shreveport-Bossier Film Industry" and that it has "a reputation for making production easy, with full support and streamlined paperwork".

The following is a list of productions shot at either Shreveport Regional or Shreveport Downtown airports:

Productions shot at Shreveport Regional Airport or Shreveport Downtown Airport
Project	Type	Year	Network
Billy the Exterminator	TV series	2009–2012	A&E
Harold & Kumar Escape from Guantanamo Bay	Movie	2008	New Line Cinema
My Mom's New Boyfriend	Movie	2008	Millennium Films
Leaves of Grass	Movie	2009	Millennium Films
Sordid Lives: The Series	TV series	2008	Logo
Thief	TV mini-series	2006	FX
W.	Movie	2008	Lionsgate
Welcome Home, Roscoe Jenkins	Movie	2008	Universal Pictures

== Accidents and incidents ==
On January 10, 1954, a Grumman G-73 Mallard operated by Union Producing Comp crashed 10 miles southeast of Shreveport airport during approach due to ice accumulation on the wings. Both crew members and all ten passengers were killed.

== See also ==
- List of airports in Louisiana
