= List of FM radio stations in the United States by call sign (initial letters KT–KV) =

This is a list of FM radio stations in the United States having call signs beginning with the letters KT through KV. Low-power FM radio stations, those with designations such as KTAH-LP, have not been included in this list.

== KT-- ==
Callsign	Frequency	City of license
KTAA	90.7 FM	Big Sandy, Texas
KTAD-FM	89.9 FM	Sterling, Colorado
KTAG	97.9 FM	Cody, Wyoming
KTAI	91.1 FM	Kingsville, Texas
KTAK	93.9 FM	Riverton, Wyoming
KTAL-FM	98.1 FM	Texarkana, Texas
KTAO	101.9 FM	Taos, New Mexico
KTAR-FM	92.3 FM	Glendale, Arizona
KTAW	89.3 FM	Walsenburg, Colorado
KTBB-FM	97.5 FM	Troup, Texas
KTBG	90.9 FM	Warrensburg, Missouri
KTBH-FM	102.7 FM	Kurtistown, Hawaii
KTBJ	89.3 FM	Festus, Missouri
KTBQ	107.7 FM	Nacogdoches, Texas
KTBT	92.1 FM	Broken Arrow, Oklahoma
KTBX	98.1 FM	Tubac, Arizona
KTBZ-FM	94.5 FM	Houston, Texas
KTCB	89.5 FM	Tillamook, Oregon
KTCC	91.9 FM	Colby, Kansas
KTCE	92.1 FM	Payson, Utah
KTCF	89.5 FM	Dolores, Colorado
KTCG	104.1 FM	Sanger, Texas
KTCH	104.9 FM	Emerson, Nebraska
KTCK-FM	96.7 FM	Flower Mound, Texas
KTCL	93.3 FM	Wheat Ridge, Colorado
KTCM	97.3 FM	Madison, Missouri
KTCN	88.3 FM	Acton, California
KTCO	98.9 FM	Duluth, Minnesota
KTCS-FM	99.9 FM	Fort Smith, Arkansas
KTCU-FM	88.7 FM	Fort Worth, Texas
KTCV	88.1 FM	Kennewick, Washington
KTCX	102.5 FM	Beaumont, Texas
KTCY	105.3 FM	Menard, Texas
KTCZ-FM	97.1 FM	Minneapolis, Minnesota
KTDA	91.7 FM	Dalhart, Texas
KTDB	89.7 FM	Ramah, New Mexico
KTDD	104.9 FM	Eatonville, Washington
KTDE	100.5 FM	Gualala, California
KTDH	89.3 FM	Dalhart, Texas
KTDL	90.7 FM	Trinidad, Colorado
KTDR	96.3 FM	Del Rio, Texas
KTDV	91.9 FM	State Center, Iowa
KTDX	89.3 FM	Laramie, Wyoming
KTDY	99.9 FM	Lafayette, Louisiana
KTDZ	103.9 FM	College, Alaska
KTEA	103.5 FM	Cambria, California
KTEC	89.5 FM	Klamath Falls, Oregon
KTED	100.5 FM	Evansville, Wyoming
KTEE	94.9 FM	North Bend, Oregon
KTEG	104.1 FM	Santa Fe, New Mexico
KTEP	88.5 FM	El Paso, Texas
KTEQ-FM	91.3 FM	Rapid City, South Dakota
KTEX	100.3 FM	Mercedes, Texas
KTEZ	99.9 FM	Zwolle, Louisiana
KTFC	103.3 FM	Sioux City, Iowa
KTFG	102.9 FM	Sioux Rapids, Iowa
KTFM	94.1 FM	Floresville, Texas
KTFR	100.5 FM	Chelsea, Oklahoma
KTFS-FM	107.1 FM	Texarkana, Arkansas
KTFW-FM	92.1 FM	Glen Rose, Texas
KTFX-FM	101.7 FM	Warner, Oklahoma
KTFY	88.1 FM	Buhl, Idaho
KTFZ	88.1 FM	Thompson Falls, Montana
KTGA	99.3 FM	Saratoga, Wyoming
KTGL	92.9 FM	Beatrice, Nebraska
KTGR-FM	100.5 FM	Fulton, Missouri
KTGS	88.3 FM	Tishomingo, Oklahoma
KTGT	88.3 FM	Thief River Falls, Minnesota
KTGV	106.3 FM	Oracle, Arizona
KTGW	91.7 FM	Fruitland, New Mexico
KTGX	106.1 FM	Owasso, Oklahoma
KTHC	95.1 FM	Sidney, Montana
KTHF	89.9 FM	Hammon, Oklahoma
KTHI	107.1 FM	Caldwell, Idaho
KTHK	105.5 FM	Idaho Falls, Idaho
KTHL	89.3 FM	Altus, Oklahoma
KTHM (FM)	94.1 FM	Waynoka, Oklahoma
KTHN	92.1 FM	La Junta, Colorado
KTHP	103.9 FM	Hemphill, Texas
KTHQ	92.5 FM	Eagar, Arizona
KTHR	107.3 FM	Wichita, Kansas
KTHS-FM	107.1 FM	Berryville, Arkansas
KTHU	100.7 FM	Corning, California
KTHX-FM	94.5 FM	Sun Valley, Nevada
KTIC-FM	107.9 FM	West Point, Nebraska
KTIG	102.7 FM	Pequot Lakes, Minnesota
KTIJ	106.9 FM	Elk City, Oklahoma
KTIL-FM	95.9 FM	Bay City, Oregon
KTIM	89.1 FM	Ellinger, Texas
KTIS-FM	98.5 FM	Minneapolis, Minnesota
KTJC	91.1 FM	Kelso, Washington
KTJJ	98.5 FM	Farmington, Missouri
KTJK	101.7 FM	Hawley, Texas
KTJM	98.5 FM	Port Arthur, Texas
KTJZ	97.5 FM	Tallulah, Louisiana
KTKB-FM	101.9 FM	Agana, Guam
KTKE	101.5 FM	Truckee, California
KTKF	89.5 FM	Tok, Alaska
KTKL	88.5 FM	Stigler, Oklahoma
KTKO	105.7 FM	Beeville, Texas
KTKS	95.1 FM	Versailles, Missouri
KTKU	105.1 FM	Juneau, Alaska
KTKX	106.7 FM	Terrell Hills, Texas
KTLB	105.9 FM	Twin Lakes, Iowa
KTLC	89.1 FM	Canon City, Colorado
KTLF	90.5 FM	Colorado Springs, Colorado
KTLH	107.9 FM	Hallsville, Texas
KTLI	99.1 FM	El Dorado, Kansas
KTLK-FM	104.9 FM	Columbia, Illinois
KTLN	90.5 FM	Thibodaux, Louisiana
KTLO-FM	97.9 FM	Mountain Home, Arkansas
KTLS-FM	106.5 FM	Holdenville, Oklahoma
KTLT	98.1 FM	Anson, Texas
KTLW	88.9 FM	Lancaster, California
KTLX	91.3 FM	Columbus, Nebraska
KTLZ	89.9 FM	Cuero, Texas
KTMC-FM	105.1 FM	McAlester, Oklahoma
KTME	89.5 FM	Reliance, Wyoming
KTMG	99.1 FM	Prescott, Arizona
KTMH	89.9 FM	Montrose, Colorado
KTMK	91.1 FM	Tillamook, Oregon
KTML	91.9 FM	South Fork, Colorado
KTMN	97.9 FM	Cloudcroft, New Mexico
KTMO	106.5 FM	New Madrid, Missouri
KTMQ	103.3 FM	Temecula, California
KTMT-FM	93.7 FM	Medford, Oregon
KTMU	88.7 FM	Muenster, Texas
KTMV	91.9 FM	Mountain Village, Alaska
KTMX	104.9 FM	York, Nebraska
KTMY	107.1 FM	Coon Rapids, Minnesota
KTNA	88.9 FM	Talkeetna, Alaska
KTND	93.5 FM	Aspen, Colorado
KTNE-FM	91.1 FM	Alliance, Nebraska
KTNG	97.3 FM	Connerville, Oklahoma
KTNN-FM	101.5 FM	Tohatchi, New Mexico
KTNT	102.5 FM	Eufaula, Oklahoma
KTNX	103.9 FM	Arcadia, Missouri
KTNY	101.7 FM	Libby, Montana
KTOC-FM	104.9 FM	Jonesboro, Louisiana
KTOG	91.9 FM	Togiak, Alaska
KTOH	99.9 FM	Kalaheo, Hawaii
KTOL	90.9 FM	Leadville, Colorado
KTOM-FM	92.7 FM	Marina, California
KTOO	104.3 FM	Juneau, Alaska
KTOP-FM	102.9 FM	Saint Marys, Kansas
KTOR	99.7 FM	Gerber, California
KTOT	89.5 FM	Spearman, Texas
KTOY	104.7 FM	Texarkana, Arkansas
KTOZ-FM	95.5 FM	Pleasant Hope, Missouri
KTPB	98.1 FM	Altheimer, Arkansas
KTPD	89.3 FM	Del Rio, Texas
KTPF	91.3 FM	Salida, Colorado
KTPG	99.3 FM	Paragould, Arkansas
KTPH	91.7 FM	Tonopah, Nevada
KTPI-FM	97.7 FM	Mojave, California
KTPK	106.9 FM	Topeka, Kansas
KTPL	88.3 FM	Pueblo, Colorado
KTPO	106.7 FM	Kootenai, Idaho
KTPR	89.9 FM	Stanton, Texas
KTPS	89.7 FM	Pagosa Springs, Colorado
KTPZ	92.7 FM	Hazelton, Idaho
KTQM-FM	99.9 FM	Clovis, New Mexico
KTQQ	88.1 FM	Elko, Nevada
KTQR	88.7 FM	Forks, Washington
KTQX	90.1 FM	Bakersfield, California
KTRA-FM	102.1 FM	Farmington, New Mexico
KTRF-FM	94.1 FM	Red Lake Falls, Minnesota
KTRG	94.1 FM	Hooks, Texas
KTRI	93.5 FM	Royal City, Washington
KTRL	90.5 FM	Stephenville, Texas
KTRM	88.7 FM	Kirksville, Missouri
KTRN	104.5 FM	White Hall, Arkansas
KTRQ	102.3 FM	Colt, Arkansas
KTRR	102.5 FM	Loveland, Colorado
KTRS-FM	104.7 FM	Casper, Wyoming
KTRT	97.5 FM	Winthrop, Washington
KTRU	91.9 FM	La Harpe, Kansas
KTRX	92.7 FM	Dickson, Oklahoma
KTRZ	105.5 FM	Taos, New Mexico
KTSC-FM	89.5 FM	Pueblo, Colorado
KTSD-FM	91.1 FM	Reliance, South Dakota
KTSE-FM	97.1 FM	Patterson, California
KTSG	91.7 FM	Steamboat Springs, Colorado
KTSL	101.9 FM	Medical Lake, Washington
KTSM-FM	99.9 FM	El Paso, Texas
KTSN-FM	88.9 FM	Blowout, Texas
KTSO	100.9 FM	Sapulpa, Oklahoma
KTSR	92.1 FM	De Quincy, Louisiana
KTST	101.9 FM	Oklahoma City, Oklahoma
KTSU	90.9 FM	Houston, Texas
KTSW	89.9 FM	San Marcos, Texas
KTSY	89.5 FM	Caldwell, Idaho
KTTG	96.3 FM	Mena, Arkansas
KTTI	95.1 FM	Yuma, Arizona
KTTK	90.7 FM	Lebanon, Missouri
KTTN-FM	92.3 FM	Trenton, Missouri
KTTR-FM	99.7 FM	St. James, Missouri
KTTS-FM	94.7 FM	Springfield, Missouri
KTTU-FM	97.3 FM	New Deal, Texas
KTTX	106.1 FM	Brenham, Texas
KTTY	105.1 FM	New Boston, Texas
KTTZ-FM	89.1 FM	Lubbock, Texas
KTUA	88.1 FM	Coweta, Oklahoma
KTUF	93.7 FM	Kirksville, Missouri
KTUG	105.1 FM	Hudson, Wyoming
KTUH	90.1 FM	Honolulu, Hawaii
KTUI-FM	102.1 FM	Sullivan, Missouri
KTUM	107.1 FM	Tatum, New Mexico
KTUN	94.5 FM	New Castle, Colorado
KTUP	98.3 FM	Dallas, Oregon
KTUT	98.9 FM	Crowell, Texas
KTUX	98.9 FM	Carthage, Texas
KTUY	101.7 FM	Togiak, Alaska
KTUZ-FM	106.7 FM	Okarche, Oklahoma
KTVR-FM	90.3 FM	La Grande, Oregon
KTWA	92.7 FM	Ottumwa, Iowa
KTWB	92.5 FM	Sioux Falls, South Dakota
KTWD	103.5 FM	Wallace, Idaho
KTWF	95.5 FM	Scotland, Texas
KTWJ	90.9 FM	Moffit–Lincoln, North Dakota
KTWL	105.3 FM	Hempstead, Texas
KTWP	91.1 FM	Twisp, Washington
KTWS	98.3 FM	Bend, Oregon
KTWV	94.7 FM	Los Angeles
KTWY	97.1 FM	Shoshoni, Wyoming
KTXB	89.7 FM	Beaumont, Texas
KTXG	90.5 FM	Greenville, Texas
KTXI	90.1 FM	Ingram, Texas
KTXJ-FM	102.7 FM	Jasper, Texas
KTXK	91.5 FM	Texarkana, Texas
KTXM	99.9 FM	Hallettsville, Texas
KTXN-FM	98.7 FM	Victoria, Texas
KTXO	94.7 FM	Goldsmith, Texas
KTXP	91.5 FM	Bushland, Texas
KTXR	98.7 FM	Springfield, Missouri
KTXT-FM	88.1 FM	Lubbock, Texas
KTXX-FM	104.9 FM	Bee Cave, Texas
KTXY	106.9 FM	Jefferson City, Missouri
KTYC	88.5 FM	Nashville, Arkansas
KTYD	99.9 FM	Santa Barbara, California
KTYK	100.7 FM	Overton, Texas
KTYL-FM	93.1 FM	Tyler, Texas
KTYR	89.7 FM	Trinity, Texas
KTYU	99.1 FM	Tanana, Alaska
KTYV	105.7 FM	Steamboat Springs, Colorado
KTZA	92.9 FM	Artesia, New Mexico
KTZU	94.9 FM	Velva, North Dakota

== KU-- ==
Callsign	Frequency	City of license
KUAC	89.9 FM	Fairbanks, Alaska
KUAD-FM	99.1 FM	Windsor, Colorado
KUAF	91.3 FM	Fayetteville, Arkansas
KUAL-FM	103.5 FM	Brainerd, Minnesota
KUAM-FM	93.9 FM	Agana, Guam
KUAO	88.7 FM	North Ogden, Utah
KUAP	89.7 FM	Pine Bluff, Arkansas
KUAR	89.1 FM	Little Rock, Arkansas
KUAS-FM	88.9 FM	Sierra Vista, Arizona
KUAT-FM	90.5 FM	Tucson, Arizona
KUAZ-FM	89.1 FM	Tucson, Arizona
KUBB	96.3 FM	Mariposa, California
KUBJ	89.7 FM	Brenham, Texas
KUBL-FM	93.3 FM	Salt Lake City, Utah
KUBO	88.7 FM	Calexico, California
KUBQ	98.7 FM	La Grande, Oregon
KUBS	91.5 FM	Newport, Washington
KUBT	93.9 FM	Honolulu, Hawaii
KUCA	91.3 FM	Conway, Arkansas
KUCB	89.7 FM	Unalaska, Alaska
KUCC	88.1 FM	Clarkston, Washington
KUCD	101.9 FM	Pearl City, Hawaii
KUCI	88.9 FM	Irvine, California
KUCO	90.1 FM	Edmond, Oklahoma
KUCR	88.3 FM	Riverside, California
KUCV	91.1 FM	Lincoln, Nebraska
KUDA	89.9 FM	Bonneville, Wyoming
KUDD	105.1 FM	American Fork, Utah
KUDI	88.7 FM	Choteau, Montana
KUDL	106.5 FM	Sacramento, California
KUDU	91.9 FM	Tok, Alaska
KUDV	106.9 FM	Bloomfield, Iowa
KUER-FM	90.1 FM	Salt Lake City, Utah
KUEU	90.5 FM	Logan, Utah
KUEZ	104.1 FM	Fallon, Nevada
KUFA	104.3 FM	Hebronville, Texas
KUFL	90.5 FM	Libby, Montana
KUFM	89.1 FM	Missoula, Montana
KUFN	91.9 FM	Hamilton, Montana
KUFR	91.7 FM	Salt Lake City, Utah
KUFW	106.3 FM	Kingsburg, California
KUFX	98.5 FM	San Jose, California
KUGO	102.5 FM	Grand Canyon Village, Arizona
KUGS	89.3 FM	Bellingham, Washington
KUHB-FM	91.9 FM	Saint Paul, Alaska
KUHC	91.5 FM	Stratford, Texas
KUHF	88.7 FM	Houston, Texas
KUHM	91.7 FM	Helena, Montana
KUHN	88.9 FM	Golden Meadow, Louisiana
KUHU	88.1 FM	Monticello, Utah
KUIC	95.3 FM	Vacaville, California
KUIM	96.1 FM	Bethel, Alaska
KUIT	93.3 FM	Goodnews Bay, Alaska
KUJ-FM	99.1 FM	Burbank, Washington
KUJJ	95.5 FM	McCall, Idaho
KUJZ	95.3 FM	Creswell, Oregon
KUKA	105.9 FM	Driscoll, Texas
KUKI-FM	103.3 FM	Ukiah, California
KUKL	89.9 FM	Kalispell, Montana
KUKN	105.5 FM	Longview, Washington
KUKU-FM	100.3 FM	Willow Springs, Missouri
KUKV	90.9 FM	Vernal, Utah
KUKY	95.9 FM	Wellton, Arizona
KULH	105.9 FM	Wheeling, Missouri
KULL	100.7 FM	Abilene, Texas
KULM-FM	98.3 FM	Columbus, Texas
KULO	94.3 FM	Alexandria, Minnesota
KULV	97.1 FM	Ukiah, California
KUMA-FM	92.1 FM	Pilot Rock, Oregon
KUMB	89.7 FM	Hollywood, Mississippi
KUMD	90.9 FM	Deer Lodge, Montana
KUMM	89.7 FM	Morris, Minnesota
KUMR	104.5 FM	Doolittle, Missouri
KUMS	89.7 FM	White Sulphur Springs, Montana
KUMT	107.9 FM	Randolph, Utah
KUMU-FM	94.7 FM	Honolulu, Hawaii
KUMW	91.7 FM	Dillon, Montana
KUMX	106.7 FM	North Fort Polk, Louisiana
KUNA-FM	96.7 FM	La Quinta, California
KUNC	91.5 FM	Greeley, Colorado
KUND-FM	89.3 FM	Grand Forks, North Dakota
KUNI	90.9 FM	Cedar Falls, Iowa
KUNK	92.7 FM	Mendocino, California
KUNM	89.9 FM	Albuquerque, New Mexico
KUNQ	99.3 FM	Houston, Missouri
KUNR	88.7 FM	Reno, Nevada
KUNV	91.5 FM	Las Vegas, Nevada
KUOI-FM	89.3 FM	Moscow, Idaho
KUOL	94.5 FM	Elko, Nevada
KUOM-FM	106.5 FM	Saint Louis Park, Minnesota
KUOO	103.9 FM	Spirit Lake, Iowa
KUOP	91.3 FM	Stockton, California
KUOR-FM	89.1 FM	Redlands, California
KUOU	89.3 FM	Roosevelt, Utah
KUOW-FM	94.9 FM	Seattle, Washington
KUPD	97.9 FM	Tempe, Arizona
KUPH	96.9 FM	Mountain View, Missouri
KUPI-FM	99.1 FM	Rexburg, Idaho
KUPL	98.7 FM	Portland, Oregon
KUPS	90.1 FM	Tacoma, Washington
KUPY	99.9 FM	Sugar City, Idaho
KUQL	98.3 FM	Ethan, South Dakota
KUQQ	102.1 FM	Milford, Iowa
KUQU	93.9 FM	Enoch, Utah
KURB	98.5 FM	Little Rock, Arkansas
KURE	88.5 FM	Ames, Iowa
KURL	93.3 FM	Billings, Montana
KURM-FM	100.3 FM	Gravette, Arkansas
KURR	103.1 FM	Hildale, Utah
KURT	93.7 FM	Prineville, Oregon
KURU	89.1 FM	Silver City, New Mexico
KURY-FM	95.3 FM	Brookings, Oregon
KUSB	103.3 FM	Hazelton, North Dakota
KUSC	91.5 FM	Los Angeles
KUSD	89.7 FM	Vermillion, South Dakota
KUSJ	105.5 FM	Harker Heights, Texas
KUSK	88.5 FM	Vernal, Utah
KUSL	89.3 FM	Richfield, Utah
KUSN	98.1 FM	Dearing, Kansas
KUSO	92.7 FM	Albion, Nebraska
KUSQ	95.1 FM	Worthington, Minnesota
KUSR	89.5 FM	Logan, Utah
KUST	88.7 FM	Moab, Utah
KUSU-FM	91.5 FM	Logan, Utah
KUSW	88.1 FM	Flora Vista, New Mexico
KUT	90.5 FM	Austin, Texas
KUTC	95.7 FM	Gunnison, Utah
KUTE	90.1 FM	Ignacio, Colorado
KUTM	92.7 FM	Kerman, California
KUTN	96.7 FM	Levan, Utah
KUTQ	102.3 FM	La Verkin, Utah
KUTT	99.5 FM	Fairbury, Nebraska
KUTU	91.3 FM	Santa Clara, Utah
KUTX	98.9 FM	Leander, Texas
KUUB	88.3 FM	Salt Lake City, Utah
KUUK	91.9 FM	Noatak, Alaska
KUUL	101.3 FM	East Moline, Illinois
KUUT	89.7 FM	Farmington, New Mexico
KUUU	92.5 FM	South Jordan, Utah
KUUZ	95.9 FM	Lake Village, Arkansas
KUVA	102.3 FM	Uvalde, Texas
KUVO	89.3 FM	Denver, Colorado
KUWA	91.3 FM	Afton, Wyoming
KUWC	91.3 FM	Casper, Wyoming
KUWD	91.5 FM	Sundance, Wyoming
KUWE	89.7 FM	Evanston, Wyoming
KUWG	90.9 FM	Gillette, Wyoming
KUWI	89.9 FM	Rawlins, Wyoming
KUWJ	90.3 FM	Jackson, Wyoming
KUWK	88.7 FM	Kaycee, Wyoming
KUWL	90.1 FM	Laramie, Wyoming
KUWN	90.5 FM	Newcastle, Wyoming
KUWP	90.1 FM	Powell, Wyoming
KUWR	91.9 FM	Laramie, Wyoming
KUWS	91.3 FM	Superior, Wisconsin
KUWT	91.3 FM	Thermopolis, Wyoming
KUWV	90.7 FM	Lingle, Wyoming
KUWW	90.9 FM	Fort Washakie, Wyoming
KUWX	90.9 FM	Pinedale, Wyoming
KUWY	88.5 FM	Laramie, Wyoming
KUWZ	90.5 FM	Rock Springs, Wyoming
KUXO	88.5 FM	Marfa, Texas
KUXU	88.5 FM	Monroe, Utah
KUXX	105.7 FM	Jackson, Minnesota
KUYI	88.1 FM	Hotevilla, Arizona
KUYY	100.1 FM	Emmetsburg, Iowa
KUZN	105.9 FM	Centerville, Texas
KUZY	93.3 FM	Nunum Iqua, Alaska
KUZZ-FM	107.9 FM	Bakersfield, California

== KV-- ==
Callsign	Frequency	City of license
KVAB	102.9 FM	Clarkston, Washington
KVAK-FM	93.3 FM	Valdez, Alaska
KVAM	88.1 FM	Cheyenne, Wyoming
KVAR	93.7 FM	Pine Ridge, South Dakota
KVAS-FM	103.9 FM	Ilwaco, Washington
KVAY	105.7 FM	Lamar, Colorado
KVAZ	91.5 FM	Henryetta, Oklahoma
KVBH	107.5 FM	San Antonio, Texas
KVBL	103.1 FM	Union, Oregon
KVCC	88.5 FM	Tucson, Arizona
KVCE	92.7 FM	Slaton, Texas
KVCF	90.5 FM	Freeman, South Dakota
KVCH	88.7 FM	Huron, South Dakota
KVCI	89.7 FM	Montezuma, Iowa
KVCK-FM	92.7 FM	Wolf Point, Montana
KVCL-FM	92.1 FM	Winnfield, Louisiana
KVCM	103.1 FM	Helena, Montana
KVCN	106.7 FM	Los Alamos, New Mexico
KVCO	88.3 FM	Concordia, Kansas
KVCP	88.3 FM	Phoenix, Arizona
KVCR	91.9 FM	San Bernardino, California
KVCS	89.1 FM	Spring Valley, Minnesota
KVCX	101.5 FM	Gregory, South Dakota
KVCY	104.7 FM	Fort Scott, Kansas
KVDG	90.9 FM	Midland, Texas
KVDI	99.3 FM	Huxley, Iowa
KVDM	88.1 FM	Hays, Kansas
KVDP	89.1 FM	Dry Prong, Louisiana
KVDR	94.7 FM	Brackettville, Texas
KVDT	103.3 FM	Allen, Texas
KVDU	104.1 FM	Houma, Louisiana
KVED	88.1 FM	Vernon, Texas
KVEG	97.5 FM	Mesquite, Nevada
KVER	91.1 FM	El Paso, Texas
KVET-FM	98.1 FM	Austin, Texas
KVFE	88.5 FM	Del Rio, Texas
KVFL	89.1 FM	Pierre, South Dakota
KVFM	91.3 FM	Beeville, Texas
KVFX	94.5 FM	Logan, Utah
KVFZ	92.1 FM	Benton, Louisiana
KVGB-FM	104.3 FM	Great Bend, Kansas
KVGK	93.1 FM	Las Vegas, Nevada
KVGL	105.7 FM	Manderson, Wyoming
KVGQ	106.9 FM	Overton, Nevada
KVGR	94.3 FM	Kiana, Alaska
KVGS	107.9 FM	Meadview, Arizona
KVHI	88.7 FM	Raymondville, Texas
KVHL	91.7 FM	Llano, Texas
KVHR	91.5 FM	Van Horn, Texas
KVHS	90.5 FM	Concord, California
KVHT	106.3 FM	Vermillion, South Dakota
KVHU	95.3 FM	Judsonia, Arkansas
KVIC	104.7 FM	Victoria, Texas
KVID	88.5 FM	Mesquite, Nevada
KVIK	104.7 FM	Decorah, Iowa
KVIL	103.7 FM	Highland Park-Dallas, Texas
KVIP-FM	98.1 FM	Redding, California
KVIR	91.9 FM	Dolan Springs, Arizona
KVIT	88.7 FM	Chandler, Arizona
KVIX	89.3 FM	Port Angeles, Washington
KVJC	91.9 FM	Globe, Arizona
KVJM	103.1 FM	Hearne, Texas
KVJS	88.1 FM	Arroyo, Texas
KVKI-FM	96.5 FM	Shreveport, Louisiana
KVKL	91.1 FM	Las Vegas, Nevada
KVKR	88.7 FM	Pine Ridge, South Dakota
KVLA-FM	90.3 FM	Coachella, California
KVLB	90.5 FM	Bend, Oregon
KVLC	101.1 FM	Hatch, New Mexico
KVLD	91.7 FM	Norfolk, Nebraska
KVLE-FM	102.3 FM	Gunnison, Colorado
KVLK	89.5 FM	Milan, New Mexico
KVLL-FM	94.7 FM	Wells, Texas
KVLM	104.7 FM	Tarzan, Texas
KVLO	101.7 FM	Humnoke, Arkansas
KVLP	91.7 FM	Tucumcari, New Mexico
KVLQ	90.1 FM	La Pine, Oregon
KVLR	92.5 FM	Sunset Valley, Texas
KVLT	88.5 FM	Temple, Texas
KVLU	91.3 FM	Beaumont, Texas
KVLW	88.1 FM	Waco, Texas
KVLX	103.9 FM	Franklin, Texas
KVLY	107.9 FM	Edinburg, Texas
KVMA-FM	102.9 FM	Shreveport, Louisiana
KVMG	88.9 FM	Raton, New Mexico
KVMK	100.9 FM	Wheelock, Texas
KVMN	89.9 FM	Cave City, Arkansas
KVMO	104.3 FM	Vandalia, Missouri
KVMR	89.5 FM	Nevada City, California
KVMT	89.1 FM	Montrose, Colorado
KVMV	96.9 FM	Mcallen, Texas
KVMX-FM	92.1 FM	Placerville, California
KVMZ	99.1 FM	Waldo, Arkansas
KVNA-FM	100.1 FM	Flagstaff, Arizona
KVNC	90.9 FM	Minturn, Colorado
KVNE	89.5 FM	Tyler, Texas
KVNF	90.9 FM	Paonia, Colorado
KVNG	91.1 FM	Eloy, Arizona
KVNO	90.7 FM	Omaha, Nebraska
KVNV	89.1 FM	Sun Valley, Nevada
KVOD	88.1 FM	Lakewood, Colorado
KVOE-FM	101.7 FM	Emporia, Kansas
KVOK-FM	101.1 FM	Kodiak, Alaska
KVOM-FM	101.7 FM	Morrilton, Arkansas
KVOO-FM	98.5 FM	Tulsa, Oklahoma
KVOQ	102.3 FM	Greenwood Village, Colorado
KVOU-FM	104.9 FM	Uvalde, Texas
KVOV	90.5 FM	Carbondale, Colorado
KVOX-FM	99.9 FM	Moorhead, Minnesota
KVPC	97.9 FM	Rapid City, South Dakota
KVPH	104.3 FM	North Las Vegas, Nevada
KVPI-FM	92.5 FM	Ville Platte, Louisiana
KVPM	95.7 FM	Arvin, California
KVPP	88.9 FM	Pago Pago, American Samoa
KVPR	89.3 FM	Fresno, California
KVPW	97.7 FM	Mecca, California
KVQI	88.5 FM	Vail, Colorado
KVRA	89.3 FM	Sisters, Oregon
KVRD-FM	105.7 FM	Cottonwood, Arizona
KVRE	92.9 FM	Hot Springs Village, Arkansas
KVRF	89.5 FM	Sutton, Alaska
KVRG	89.7 FM	Chillicothe, Texas
KVRH-FM	92.3 FM	Salida, Colorado
KVRK	88.3 FM	Chickaloon, Alaska
KVRO	98.1 FM	Stillwater, Oklahoma
KVRP-FM	97.1 FM	Haskell, Texas
KVRS	90.3 FM	Lawton, Oklahoma
KVRT	90.7 FM	Victoria, Texas
KVRV	97.7 FM	Monte Rio, California
KVRW	107.3 FM	Lawton, Oklahoma
KVRX	91.7 FM	Austin, Texas
KVSC	88.1 FM	Saint Cloud, Minnesota
KVSE	89.1 FM	Blanchard, Louisiana
KVSF-FM	101.5 FM	Pecos, New Mexico
KVSJ-FM	89.5 FM	Tracy, California
KVSP	103.5 FM	Anadarko, Oklahoma
KVSR	90.7 FM	Kirksville, Missouri
KVSS	102.7 FM	Papillion, Nebraska
KVST	99.7 FM	Huntsville, Texas
KVSU	106.3 FM	Desert Hills, Arizona
KVSV-FM	105.5 FM	Beloit, Kansas
KVTI	90.9 FM	Tacoma, Washington
KVTY	105.1 FM	Lewiston, Idaho
KVUD	89.5 FM	Bay City, Texas
KVUH	88.5 FM	Laytonville, California
KVUJ	91.1 FM	Lake Jackson, Texas
KVUT	99.7 FM	Cuney, Texas
KVUU	99.9 FM	Pueblo, Colorado
KVUW	102.3 FM	Wendover, Nevada
KVVA-FM	107.1 FM	Apache Junction, Arizona
KVVF	105.7 FM	Santa Clara, California
KVVL	97.1 FM	Maryville, Missouri
KVVP	105.7 FM	Leesville, Louisiana
KVVR	97.9 FM	Dutton, Montana
KVVS	105.5 FM	Rosamond, California
KVVZ	100.7 FM	San Rafael, California
KVWC-FM	103.1 FM	Vernon, Texas
KVWE	102.9 FM	Amarillo, Texas
KVWF	100.5 FM	Augusta, Kansas
KVWG-FM	95.3 FM	Dilley, Texas
KVXO	88.3 FM	Fort Collins, Colorado
KVYA	91.5 FM	Cedarville, California
KVYB	106.3 FM	Oak View, California
KVYN	99.3 FM	Saint Helena, California

== See also ==
- North American call sign
