= KTMU =

- Muenster, Texas; United States
- Frequency: 88.7 MHz

Programming
- Format: Southern Gospel

Ownership
- Owner: Randall Christy; (South Central Oklahoma Christian Broadcasting Inc.)
- Sister stations: KCBK, KIMY, KOSG, KTGS, KVAZ, KZBS, KBWW, WRCC, KOKN

Technical information
- Licensing authority: FCC
- Facility ID: 174356
- Class: A
- ERP: 500 watts
- HAAT: 21 meters (69 ft)
- Transmitter coordinates: 33°43′32″N 97°28′26″W

Links
- Public license information: Public file; LMS
- Webcast: Listen Live
- Website: thegospelstation.com

KTMU (88.7 FM, "The Gospel Station") is an American non-commercial educational radio station licensed to serve the community of Muenster, Texas. The station's broadcast license is held by Randall Christy's South Central Oklahoma Christian Broadcasting Inc.

== Programming ==
KTMU broadcasts a Southern Gospel music format as an affiliate of the Gospel Station Network.

== History ==
In October 2007, 1 A Chord, Inc., applied to the Federal Communications Commission (FCC) for a construction permit for a new broadcast radio station to serve Muenster, Texas. The FCC granted this permit on December 12, 2008, with a scheduled expiration date of December 12, 2011. The new station was assigned call sign "KTMU" on February 6, 2009. After construction and testing were completed, the station was granted its broadcast license on January 6, 2012.

In February 2012, license holder 1 A Chord, Inc., applied to the FCC to transfer the KTMU license to Randall Christy's South Central Oklahoma Christian Broadcasting, Inc., in exchange for $1,000. The Commission approved the transfer on April 25, 2012, and the sale was consummated on December 1, 2012.
