= KSUW =

Coordinates: 44°37′23.5″N 107°7′5.4″W

- Sheridan, Wyoming; United States
- Frequency: 91.3 MHz (HD Radio)
- Branding: Wyoming Public Radio

Programming
- Format: Wyoming Public Radio
- Subchannels: HD2: Classical
- Affiliations: Wyoming Public Radio, NPR

Ownership
- Owner: University of Wyoming; (University of Wyoming)

History
- First air date: 1997

Technical information
- Licensing authority: FCC
- Facility ID: 82438
- Class: C1
- ERP: 20,000 watts
- HAAT: 363.9 meters (1,194 ft)

Links
- Public license information: Public file; LMS
- Webcast: Stream
- Website: wyomingpublicmedia.org

KSUW (91.3 FM) is a radio station licensed to Sheridan, Wyoming, United States. The station is owned by the University of Wyoming, and is an affiliate of Wyoming Public Radio (WPR), airing a format consisting of news, jazz, adult album alternative and classical music originating from KUWR in Laramie, Wyoming. The station's tower is located southwest of Sheridan in the Bighorn Mountains. The station moved to Red Grade in August 2019, increasing power to 20,000 watts, with a better height than its previous location south of Sheridan.
