= KSYE =

KSYE may refer to:

- KSYE (FM), a defunct radio station (88.3 FM) formerly licensed to serve Carter, Oklahoma, United States
- KCBK, a radio station (91.5 FM) licensed to serve Frederick, Oklahoma, which held the call sign KSYE from 1985 to 2014
