= Kvar =

Kvar or KVAR may refer to:

- Kvar, a character from the video game Tales of Symphonia
- Kilovolt-amperes reactive, thousand Volt-ampere reactive, a unit of reactive power
- KVAR (FM), a radio station (93.7 FM) licensed to Pine Ridge, South Dakota
- KPNX, a television station (Channel 12) licensed to Mesa, Arizona, which formerly used the call sign KVAR
- Kvar, the number 4 in the constructed language Esperanto
