= Wyoming Public Media =

Public broadcaster

Wyoming Public Media is a public broadcaster and is part of the University of Wyoming in Laramie. The organization operates several services: Wyoming Public Radio, Classical Wyoming, Jazz Wyoming, Wyoming Sounds, and wyomingpublicmedia.org. Wyoming Public Media does not operate the Wyoming PBS public television station.

Wyoming Public Media teaches the history and sounds of the state of Wyoming.
