= KROK (FM) =

- Fort Johnson South, Louisiana; United States
- Broadcast area: Leesville, DeRidder and surrounding areas
- Frequency: 95.7 MHz
- Branding: Channel 95.7

Programming
- Format: Adult album alternative

Ownership
- Owner: West Central Broadcasting Co., Inc.
- Sister stations: KUMX, KVVP

History
- First air date: February 22, 2003 (as KNUF)
- Former call signs: KNUF (2/2003-3/2003)
- Call sign meaning: K RO(c)K - Name alluding to the format

Technical information
- Licensing authority: FCC
- Facility ID: 77184
- Class: C3
- ERP: 25,000 watts
- HAAT: 89.7 meters
- Transmitter coordinates: 31°03′05.00″N 93°16′41.00″W

Links
- Public license information: Public file; LMS
- Webcast: Listen Live
- Website: krok.com

KROK (95.7 FM) is a radio station broadcasting an adult album alternative music format. Licensed to Fort Johnson South, Louisiana, United States, the station serves the area surrounding Fort Johnson and Vernon parish and surrounding areas. The station is currently owned by West Central Broadcasting Co., Inc.

The station is one of only four adult album alternative stations in Louisiana. The other three are University run KSLU in Hammond, KYMK in Maurice, and WXDR-LP in New Orleans.

It's an affiliate of the syndicated weekly Pink Floyd program "Floydian Slip."
