= Wyoming Public Radio =

Public radio network in Wyoming

- Laramie, Wyoming; United States
- Broadcast area: State of Wyoming

Programming
- Format: Public radio
- Affiliations: NPR, PRX, BBC

Ownership
- Owner: University of Wyoming

History
- First air date: September 14, 1966

Technical information
- Licensing authority: FCC

Links
- Public license information: Public Radio Public file; LMS
- Webcast: Listen live
- Website: wyomingpublicmedia.org
- For technical information, see § Stations.

Wyoming Public Radio (WPR) is the statewide public radio network in Wyoming, and is licensed to the University of Wyoming in Laramie, Wyoming, United States, with headquarters inside the basement of Knight Hall on the UW campus on East University Avenue (at the corner of South 12th Street and Ivinson Avenue) in Laramie.

== Programming and operation ==
Although licensed to the university, the network does not produce student-derived programming. Twice a year, in the fall and in the spring, the station conducts pledge drives, which is where a majority of its budget comes from. From the UW campus in Laramie, the network produces local news and music programming, mostly consisting of jazz, classical and adult album alternative music. The network also airs a variety of syndicated programs from National Public Radio, Public Radio Exchange, Native Voice One, and American Public Media. Some NPR, PRX, and BBC World Service programming includes Morning Edition, All Things Considered, BBC World Service, and many others.

Wyoming Public Radio also produces Classical Wyoming, a 24-hour classical format. It is available as an analog radio service in Laramie, Rock Springs, and Lander. It is also available on HD-2 throughout the state. WPR is the only public radio network produced in Wyoming. Other public radio networks and stations (including Yellowstone Public Radio, KUER-FM, KUNC, and KUVO) also reach into parts of the state.

== History ==
Wyoming Public Radio was founded in 1966, and the station's format is similar to that of many other American public radio stations. The station can trace its roots back to KFBU, Wyoming's first radio station, which broadcast from St. Matthew's Cathedral in Laramie. KFBU was put on air by Warner N. Crosby, an engineering student at the University of Wyoming. He held a second-grade commercial license for radio, which, at the time, was required to broadcast. The station went on air with 10 watts on October 3, 1922. In 1923, the station was upgraded to 25 watts and more power later on. The station had a turbulent history but was often received at far distances. It was transferred to the university in early 1929, and the call sign changed to KWYO. Due to a lack of available funding, KWYO was deleted in September 1929.

On September 28, 1938, broadcasts from the university were picked up via wire to be aired across the NBC Radio Network. In 1957, the university's Engineering Department began "University Radio." On January 1, 1965, KTWO, Wyoming's oldest commercial radio station, donated a board to the university to use for on air broadcasts. The station's first affiliate, KUWR, received its license in 1966 and went on air for the fall semester. KUWR-FM broadcast from the student union. In 1966, then University President John King encouraged the station to be used for sports broadcasts. KUWR was Wyoming's second FM radio station, and was initially 10 watts, on 91.5 MHz. The station moved to 91.9 and increased power to 50,000 watts in April 1977. It was at that time that the studios were moved to Knight Hall where they remain today.

In the late 1970s, KUWR began to pick up programming from National Public Radio, including All Things Considered. In the 1980s, network staples like Morning Edition and A Prairie Home Companion were added to the lineup. In the mid-1980s, translators of KUWR were put on air in Casper, and Aspen, Colorado. Demand for the radio network began to grow statewide, along with construction permits for new stations. KUWR's translator in Casper was limited to 10 watts, and the signal was unreliable due to wind issues. It was thought that a state-wide network could be built in 10 years.

Wyoming Public Radio has continued to add stations to improve coverage throughout the state.

In September 2016, Wyoming Public Radio launched a fourth radio service named Wyoming Sounds. Wyoming Sounds is a rock-based format with emphasis on singer-songwriters and a wide variety of styles, including acoustic, folk, blues, soul, reggae, world, and Americana music. It is carried as an analog radio service in Laramie, Torrington, Lander, Riverton, and Worland. It is also available on HD-3 channels throughout the state. Its website is wyomingsounds.org.

The network celebrated its 55th year of broadcasting in 2021 with a slideshow of where the network started and how it grew.

== Stations ==
Call sign	Frequency	City of license	State	Facility ID	ERP W	Height m (ft)	Class	Transmitter coordinates
KUWA	91.3 FM (Note: Transmits in HD Radio, and has station name of WPR -FM)	Afton	Wyoming	83869	400	−95 m (−312 ft)	A	42°51′2.00″N 110°58′46″W
KBUW	90.5 FM	Buffalo	Wyoming	88434	430	−60 m (−200 ft)	A	44°20′50″N 106°43′25″W
KUWC	91.3 FM	Casper	Wyoming	82539	530	544 m (1,785 ft)	C3	42°44′26″N 106°21′34″W
KDUW	91.7 FM	Douglas	Wyoming	92622	450	95 m (312 ft)	A	42°43′24″N 105°18′21″W
KUWE	89.7 FM	Evanston	Wyoming	173678	2,000	403.6 m (1,324 ft)	C2	41°21′14″N 110°54′38″W
KUWW	90.9 FM	Fort Washakie	Wyoming	174336	8,000	151 m (495 ft)	C3	42°54′27″N 108°44′50″W
KUWG	90.9 FM	Gillette	Wyoming	82478	450	126 m (413 ft)	A	44°12′34″N 105°28′4″W
KUWJ	90.3 FM	Jackson	Wyoming	69061	3,000	337 m (1,106 ft)	C2	43°27′40″N 110°45′9″W
KUWK	88.7 FM	Kaycee	Wyoming	173684	1,600	98.5 m (323 ft)	A	43°53′41″N 106°40′48″W
KUWR (Note: Flagship station)	91.9 FM	Laramie	Wyoming	69131	100,000	335 m (1,099 ft)	C0	41°18′36″N 105°27′17″W
KUWV	90.7 FM	Lingle	Wyoming	177173	14,000	96.1 m (315 ft)	C3	42°20′02.80″N 104°09′56″W
KUWN	90.5 FM	Newcastle	Wyoming	83868	400	62 m (203 ft)	A	43°49′57″N 104°13′8″W
KUWX	90.9 FM	Pinedale	Wyoming	92820	450	134 m (440 ft)	A	42°50′40″N 109°55′24″W
KUWP	90.1 FM	Powell	Wyoming	92308	430	495 m (1,624 ft)	C3	44°35′14″N 108°51′8″W
KUWI	89.9 FM	Rawlins	Wyoming	173682	2,000	300.6 m (986 ft)	C3	41°40′46″N 107°14′8″W
KUWZ	90.5 FM	Rock Springs	Wyoming	69285	35,000	512 m (1,680 ft)	C0	41°25′39″N 109°07′17″W
KAIW	88.9 FM	Saratoga	Wyoming	93001	580	996.3 m (3,269 ft)	C2	41°37′49.1″N 106°32′0.9″W
KSUW	91.3 FM	Sheridan	Wyoming	82438	20,000	363.9 m (1,194 ft)	C1	44°36′9″N 106°55′51″W
KUWD	91.5 FM	Sundance	Wyoming	92621	430	485 m (1,591 ft)	C3	44°28′35″N 104°26′54″W
KUWT	91.3 FM	Thermopolis	Wyoming	92816	2,000	598 m (1,962 ft)	C2	43°26′16″N 107°59′48″W
KEUW	89.9 FM	Torrington	Wyoming	173683	6,000	3.7 m (12 ft)	A	42°04′35″N 104°11′28″W

Notes

Broadcast translators
Call sign	Frequency (MHz)	City of license	State	Facility ID	Rebroadcasts
K219LW	91.7	Driggs	Idaho	91526	KUWR
K217BP	91.3	Dubois	Wyoming	69276	KUWR
K298CH	107.5	Mountain View	Wyoming	27136	KUWZ
K206AJ	89.1	Sinclair	Wyoming	8735	KUWR
K298AY	107.5	Wheatland	Wyoming	157083	KUWR
K227BB	93.3	Worland	Wyoming	139565	KUWT

=== Wyoming Sounds ===
Wyoming Public Media operates an adult album alternative network branded Wyoming Sounds.

Two of the transmitters in this network, KTWY and KXWY, were previously commercial licenses held by Cochise Broadcasting, which only broadcast periodically to maintain their licenses. In 2017, the FCC entered into a consent decree with Cochise by which it surrendered these stations, KWWY (in the Classical Wyoming network), and other stations for donation to other entities. KNWT operated independently from 2009 to 2017 as a service of Northwest College in Powell.

Call sign	Frequency	City of license	State	Facility ID	ERP W	Height m (ft)	Class	Transmitter coordinates
KNWT	89.1 FM	Cody	Wyoming	172695	16,500	483 m (1,585 ft)	C1	44°34′29.5″N 108°49′32.6″W
KTWY	97.1 FM	Shoshoni	Wyoming	166052	2,200	606 m (1,988 ft)	C1	43°26′16″N 107°59′46″W
KXWY	103.1 FM	Hudson	Wyoming	176944	30,000	175.6 m (576 ft)	C2	42°54′28″N 108°44′49.1″W

Broadcast translators of Wyoming Sounds
Call sign	Frequency (MHz)	City of license	State	Facility ID
K247BC	97.3	Jackson	Wyoming	158404
K278CM	103.5	Laramie	Wyoming	36554
K206AJ	89.1	Sinclair	Wyoming	8735
K208FY	89.5	Torrington	Wyoming	24665
K231BW	94.1	Worland	Wyoming	139569

=== Classical Wyoming ===
Three stations air their own programming, consisting mostly of classical music:

Call sign	Frequency	City of license	State	Facility ID	ERP W	Height m (ft)	Class	Transmitter coordinates
KUWY	88.5 FM	Laramie	Wyoming	91583	135	298 m (978 ft)	A	41°18′36″N 105°27′17″W
KZUW	88.5 FM	Reliance	Wyoming	176944	260	472.3 m (1,550 ft)	A	41°25′39″N 109°7′17″W
KWWY	106.5 FM	Shoshoni	Wyoming	166053	2,200	606 m (1,988 ft)	C1	43°26′16″N 107°59′46″W

Broadcast translators of Classical Wyoming
Call sign	Frequency (MHz)	City of license	State	Facility ID	Rebroadcasts
K240EK	95.9	Jackson	Wyoming	158303	KUWJ-HD2
K220GP	91.9	Lander	Wyoming	69240	KUWY

=== KUWL ===
KUWL airs its own programming, consisting mostly of jazz music:

Call sign	Frequency	City of license	State	Facility ID	ERP W	Height m (ft)	Class	Transmitter coordinates
KUWL	90.1 FM	Laramie	Wyoming	91563	110	295 m (968 ft)	A	41°18′36″N 105°27′17″W

Broadcast translators of KUWL
Call sign	Frequency (MHz)	City of license	State	Facility ID
K213EZ	90.5	Riverton	Wyoming	69240

Some of the affiliates are broadcasting digitally via HD Radio, with a subchannel consisting of full-time classical music, mostly from the Classical 24 network.

== See also ==
- Wyoming Public Television
