= Paula Losoya Taylor =

Mexican-American town founder

Paula Losoya Taylor (died July 17, 1902) was one of the founders of San Felipe Del Rio (later Del Rio) in Texas. Her hacienda in Del Rio became a major employer in the region, for workers in farming and ranching.

It was also an important gathering spot for worship, discussion, and more. Taylor donated land to create a Catholic cemetery, a fort, and schools in Del Rio.

== Biography ==
She was born Paula Losoya de Rivera in Guerrero, Tamaulipas. She married an Anglo-American, James H. Taylor.

Between 1860 and 1870, Losoya de Rivera and her husband; her sister, Refugio, and brother-in-law moved from Rio Grande City into the countryside. The Taylor couple had at least one child.

In 1862, Losoya Taylor built the first hacienda in Del Rio. Taylor and her sister quickly arranged to cultivate the land of their hacienda right away, hiring workers from Las Zapas. Their hiring of Mexican workers attracted migrants from Mexico into the San Felipe area of Del Rio. Taylor and her husband developed the first acequias in the area, the first of which was called Acequia Madre.

On April 4, 1876, her husband, James, died. He left her his possessions. Some sources indicate that she married again in December 1876, to a man who may have been known as Charles Rivers or Rivera.

On the estate, the two sisters and Taylor's family continued to work and thrive. She helped raise some of her relatives' children. The two sisters arranged to have Catholic priests from Eagle Pass say mass for workers at the estate, and many residents of San Feilipe Del Rio also attended. Catholic residents attended mass at her hacienda until 1895, when the church established Sacred Heart in Del Rio.

The hacienda also operated local industry: a sugarcane mill, flour mill, a cotton gin, and a Mexican-style candy factory. The remains of the hacienda are still known locally as the Rivers Home.

Because of discrimination, Mexican people in the area were prevented from burying their dead at the Anglo-American cemetery, restricted to Protestants. The American cemetery did not allow them. In 1884, Taylor donated four acres of her land to create a cemetery for Mexican people.

The land she donated was at the top of the hill: marked by a cross, it already had five burials. This area later became known as Cemeterio Viejo Loma de la Cruz.

Taylor also donated 60 acres of her land to build a fort for defense of the town. She donated more land to build area schools.

== Legacy and honors ==
Taylor died on July 17, 1902. In 1976, La Hacienda was published, which described the history of Del Rio and featured Taylor's estate. Taylor is depicted in a mural at Moore Park in Del Rio. A Texas Historical Marker is located at her hacienda and was erected in 1982.
