= KDRN =

Spanish-language radio station in Del Rio, Texas, United States

- Del Rio, Texas; United States
- Frequency: 1230 kHz
- Branding: La Unica 1230 AM

Programming
- Format: Spanish variety

Ownership
- Owner: Jorge and Ana Suday; (Suday Investment Group Inc)
- Sister stations: KDLK-FM

History
- First air date: 1947
- Former call signs: KDLK (1947–1986, 1995–1999); KLKE (1986–1995); KTJK (1999–2012); KLTO (2012–2018)

Technical information
- Licensing authority: FCC
- Facility ID: 22119
- Class: C
- Power: 860 watts
- Transmitter coordinates: 29.4293°N 100.9051°W

Links
- Public license information: Public file; LMS
- Webcast: Listen live
- Website: kdrndelrio.com

KDRN 1230 AM is a radio station licensed to Del Rio, Texas. The station broadcasts a Spanish Variety format and is owned by Jorge and Ana Suday, through licensee Suday Investment Group Inc.
