= KZBS =

- Granite, Oklahoma; United States
- Broadcast area: Altus, Oklahoma
- Frequency: 104.3 MHz

Programming
- Format: Regional Mexican

Ownership
- Owner: BCVision

Technical information
- Licensing authority: FCC
- Facility ID: 166022
- Class: C3
- ERP: 1,700 watts
- HAAT: 277.0 meters
- Transmitter coordinates: 34°58′39″N 99°24′35″W

Links
- Public license information: Public file; LMS

KZBS (104.3 FM) is a radio station licensed to Granite, Oklahoma, United States. The station is currently owned by BCVision. and broadcasts a Regional Mexican format.

== History ==
This station was assigned call sign KZBS on April 1, 2008. Those letters had been assigned during the 1980s to what is now KYIS in Oklahoma City. From 2008 to 2019 the station was an affiliate of The Gospel Station Network.
