= KNWT =

- Cody, Wyoming; United States
- Broadcast area: Bighorn Basin
- Frequency: 89.1 MHz
- Branding: Wyoming Sounds

Programming
- Format: Adult album alternative
- Network: Wyoming Public Radio

Ownership
- Owner: University of Wyoming

History
- First air date: November 17, 2010
- Call sign meaning: Northwest Trappers, in reference to Northwest College

Technical information
- Licensing authority: FCC
- Facility ID: 172695
- Class: C1
- ERP: 16,500 watts
- HAAT: 483 meters (1,585 ft)
- Transmitter coordinates: 44°34′29.5″N 108°49′32.6″W

Links
- Public license information: Public file; LMS
- Webcast: Listen Live
- Website: http://wyomingsounds.com/

KNWT (89.1 FM) is a U.S. radio station broadcasting an adult album alternative format from the Wyoming Sounds network of Wyoming Public Radio. It is licensed to Cody, Wyoming, United States, and serves the entire Bighorn Basin area. The station is currently owned by the University of Wyoming.

The call sign reflects its original owner and history, having been built and operated by Northwest College in Powell. After the closure of the college's broadcasting program and a tower lease dispute, the license was transferred to Wyoming Public Radio.

== History ==
On July 6, 2009, the Federal Communications Commission (FCC) granted a construction permit to Northwest College for a new noncommercial educational radio station. Programming began on November 17, 2010, after obtaining FCC approval; studios were located in the Nelson Performing Arts Center on the campus, while the transmitter was on Cedar Mountain near the city of license, Cody. In conjunction with the opening of the station, renovations were made to the college's recording studios, including one located just off the auditorium that enabled KNWT to broadcast performances held there. Known as Trapper Radio, the station aired a college radio format with programming and news produced by local students.

In 2016, due to budget cuts, Northwest College ended its radio/TV broadcasting program. However, KNWT continued to operate. In 2017, a dispute erupted between Northwest College and Legend Towers, Inc., a sister company to the local Legend Communications radio stations which owned the Cedar Mountain tower on which KNWT's antenna was located. Legend alleged its lease required the college to pay annually, whereas the college desired to pay monthly. Legend wrote the college a letter, stating it was out of compliance with the terms of its lease, and demanded it pay the three remaining years of its lease up front. When administrators asked for more detail, Legend responded by disconnecting the power, taking KNWT off the air on July 17, 2017.

As Northwest College no longer had a tower lease or an active program to run KNWT, it entered into negotiations to donate the facility to Wyoming Public Radio. In February 2018, the license donation was consummated, with most of the sound equipment installed in the college's studios transferred to the music program. WPR relocated the facility to its existing site in the McCullough Peaks and returned KNWT to operation in July 2018 with its Wyoming Sounds service.
