= KDLK-FM =

Radio station in Del Rio, Texas

- Del Rio, Texas; United States
- Broadcast area: Del Rio
- Frequency: 94.1 MHz
- Branding: 94.1 KDLK

Programming
- Format: Country music

Ownership
- Owner: Suday Investment Group Inc
- Sister stations: KDRN

History
- First air date: August 15, 1966
- Former call signs: KLKE (1979–1986)
- Former frequencies: 94.3 MHz (to 2002)

Technical information
- Licensing authority: FCC
- Facility ID: 22118
- Class: C3
- ERP: 7,200 watts
- HAAT: 84.0 meters (275.6 ft)
- Transmitter coordinates: 29°25′45″N 100°54′17″W

Links
- Public license information: Public file; LMS

KDLK-FM (94.1 FM) is a radio station licensed to Del Rio, Texas, United States. The station serves the Del Rio area. The station is owned by Suday Investment Group Inc.

== History ==
On February 5, 1965, Queen City Broadcasting Company applied to build a new FM radio station in Del Rio at 94.3 MHz. The Federal Communications Commission approved the application on November 22, 1965, and KDLK-FM signed on August 15, 1966, a separately programmed outlet from KDLK (1230 AM). KDLK-AM-FM was sold in 1968 to Western Plains Broadcasting Corporation, headed by Gerald R. Mazur, for $185,000. Rodney Robertson acquired Western Plains in 1972; he moved the KDLK stations into a new house and outfitted the FM with stereo capability for the first time. KDLK-FM programmed a country music format, complementing the Top 40 sound of the AM frequency.

Forum Broadcasting acquired KDLK-AM-FM in 1976 for $165,000. The call letters for the FM station were changed to KLKE on June 4, 1979; the two stations exchanged call letters in 1986, making 94.3 FM KDLK-FM again. KDLK-FM moved to 94.1 MHz in 2002.

After more than 40 years of ownership, Forum sold its Del Rio stations in 2018 to Suday Investment Group, led by Jorge Suday, for $440,000. The sale was consummated on April 4, 2019.
