= KIMY =

Radio station in Watonga–Oklahoma City, Oklahoma

- Watonga, Oklahoma; United States
- Broadcast area: Oklahoma City, Oklahoma
- Frequency: 93.9 MHz

Programming
- Format: Southern Gospel

Ownership
- Owner: South Central Oklahoma Christian Broadcasting, Inc.
- Sister stations: KTGS, KVAZ, KOSG, KCBK, KBWW

History
- Call sign meaning: reference to former branding

Technical information
- Licensing authority: FCC
- Facility ID: 69913
- Class: A
- ERP: 6,000 watts
- HAAT: 99 meters (325 ft)
- Transmitter coordinates: 35°54′19.10″N 98°23′13.30″W

Links
- Public license information: Public file; LMS
- Webcast: Listen Live
- Website: thegospelstation.com

KIMY (93.9 FM) is a radio station licensed to Watonga, Oklahoma, United States. The station is currently owned by South Central Oklahoma Christian Broadcasting, Inc.

KIMY broadcasts a southern gospel format to the Oklahoma City, Oklahoma, area.

== History ==
This station was assigned call sign KIMY on December 14, 1987. Went on the air for The Gospel Station in January 2004.
