= KVFE =

Radio station in Del Rio, Texas

- Del Rio, Texas; United States
- Broadcast area: Del Rio, Texas
- Frequency: 88.5 MHz

Programming
- Format: Contemporary Christian music

Ownership
- Owner: Inspiracom; (World Radio Network, Inc.)

History
- First air date: January 2, 2014

Technical information
- Licensing authority: FCC
- Facility ID: 93013
- Class: C2
- ERP: 50,000 watts
- HAAT: 74 meters (243 ft)
- Transmitter coordinates: 29°21′54″N 100°51′18″W

Links
- Public license information: Public file; LMS
- Website: kvfe.org

KVFE (88.5 FM) is a radio station broadcasting a Christian format. It is licensed to Del Rio, Texas. The station is currently owned by World Radio Network, Inc.

The KVFE transmitter was turned on January 2, 2014, giving Inspiracom coverage of all border cities except San Diego/Tijuana. The application had been made in 1999, but a construction permit was not awarded until 2011, a timeline typical on the US-Mexico border.

== FM translators ==
The following FM translator is authorized to rebroadcast KVFE.

Call sign	Frequency	City of license	FID	ERP (W)	HAAT	FCC info
K236BL	95.1 FM	Del Rio, Texas	141067	26	52 m (171 ft)	LMS
