= KVVP =

- Leesville, Louisiana; United States
- Broadcast area: Leesville, Deridder, Fort Johnson
- Frequency: 105.7 MHz
- Branding: Today's Country 105.7

Programming
- Format: Country
- Affiliations: AP News

Ownership
- Owner: Stannard Broadcasting Inc.
- Sister stations: KROK, KUMX

Technical information
- Licensing authority: FCC
- Facility ID: 62277
- Class: C3
- ERP: 25,000 watts
- HAAT: 137 meters
- Transmitter coordinates: 31°00′19.00″N 93°16′42.00″W

Links
- Public license information: Public file; LMS
- Webcast: Listen Live
- Website: todayscountry1057.com

KVVP (105.7 FM, "Today's Country 105.7") is an American radio station broadcasting a country music format. Licensed to Leesville, Louisiana, United States, the station serves the area surrounding Vernon Parish and surrounding areas in West Central Louisiana. The station is currently owned by Stannard Broadcasting Inc.
