= KOSG =

Radio station in Pawhuska, Oklahoma

- Pawhuska, Oklahoma; United States
- Frequency: 103.9 MHz

Programming
- Format: Southern Gospel

Ownership
- Owner: South Central Oklahoma Christian Broadcasting, Inc.
- Sister stations: KTGS, KVAZ, KIMY, KBWW, KCBK

Technical information
- Licensing authority: FCC
- Facility ID: 56088
- Class: A
- ERP: 6,000 watts
- HAAT: 100.0 meters
- Transmitter coordinates: 36°44′56.00″N 96°17′51.00″W

Links
- Public license information: Public file; LMS
- Webcast: Listen Live
- Website: thegospelstation.com

KOSG (103.9 FM) is a radio station licensed to Pawhuska, Oklahoma, United States. The station is currently owned by South Central Oklahoma Christian Broadcasting, Inc.

== History ==
The allotment that would become KOSG 103.9 started at 104.9 as KMYB. KMYB 104.9 was known as "Y-104" and ran a satellite oldies format. It was owned by the Davel Broadcast Group and was only on for a few years. It went silent and the license was eventually lost. The 104.9 frequency remained allocated to Pawhuska, though other stations on and near 104.9 upgraded and necessitated the vacant Pawhuska allotment to move to 103.9.

This station was assigned call sign KTGP on April 1, 1996, which ran a satellite country format. This station was assigned call sign KBVL on November 9, 1998, which ran oldies and AC formats during its tenure. This station was assigned call sign KOSG on January 15, 2007. It was a classic rock station on December 31, 2008 at midnight on January 1, 2009 it was changed to Southern Gospel.
