= KUYY =

Coordinates: 43°07′24″N 94°51′28″W

- Emmetsburg, Iowa; United States
- Broadcast area: Spencer, Iowa (Iowa Great Lakes)
- Frequency: 100.1 MHz
- Branding: Y100.1

Programming
- Format: Adult top 40

Ownership
- Owner: Community First Broadcasting, LLC
- Sister stations: KUQQ, KUOO

Technical information
- Licensing authority: FCC
- Facility ID: 29724
- Class: C3
- ERP: 16,000 watts
- HAAT: 125 meters (410 ft)

Links
- Public license information: Public file; LMS
- Website: y100-fm.com

KUYY is a radio station airing an adult top 40 format licensed to Emmetsburg, Iowa, broadcasting on 100.1 FM. Branded "Y100.1", the station serves the areas of Spencer, Iowa, Estherville, Iowa, and the Iowa Great Lakes and is owned by Community First Broadcasting, LLC. KUYY is sister stations with KUOO and KUQQ. The station studios are in Spencer.
