= Del Rio, Texas =

City in the United States

- City
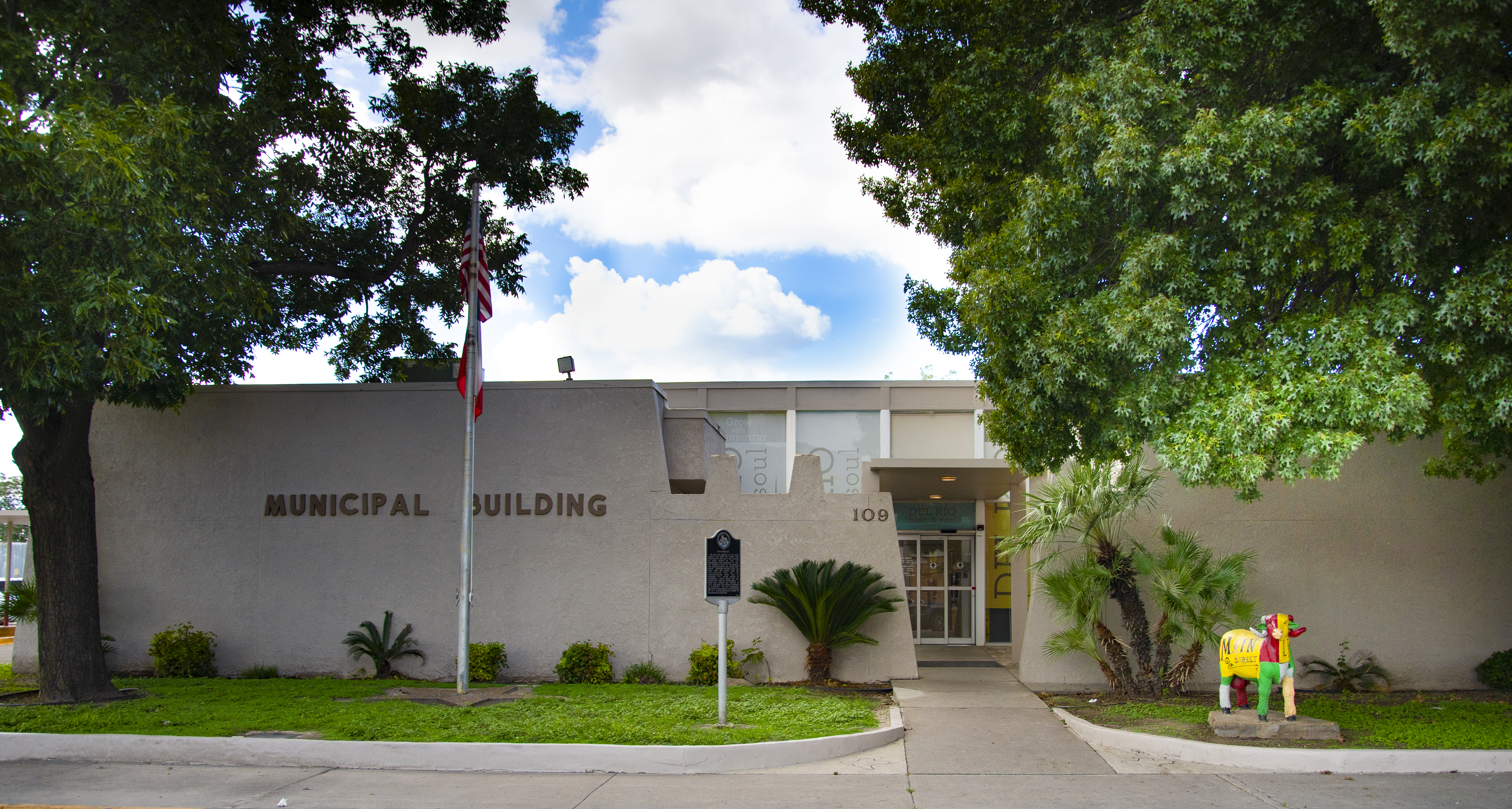
- City Hall

- Logo

- Location of Del Rio, Texas
- Coordinates: 29°22′15″N 100°52′48″W
- Country: United States
- State: Texas
- County: Val Verde

Government
  - Type: Council-Manager

Area
  - Total: 20.51 sq mi (53.12 km^{2})
  - Land: 20.44 sq mi (52.94 km^{2})
  - Water: 0.069 sq mi (0.18 km^{2})
- Elevation: 984 ft (300 m)

Population (2020)
  - Total: 34,673
  - Density: 1,749.6/sq mi (675.53/km^{2})
- Time zone: UTC−6 (CST)
  - Summer (DST): UTC−5 (CST)
- ZIP code: 78840-78843, 78847
- Area code: 830
- FIPS code: 48-19792
- GNIS feature ID: 2410316
- Website: CityOfDelRio.com

Del Rio (in Spanish, Del Río, "from the river") is a city in and the county seat of Val Verde County in southwestern Texas, United States. As of 2020, Del Rio had a population of 34,673. Del Rio is nicknamed the “Paris of the Rio Grande.”

== History ==
The Spanish established a small settlement south of the Rio Grande in present-day Mexico, and some Spanish colonists settled on the north side of the Rio Grande as early as the 18th century.

The United States acquired the territory following the Mexican War, and after the American Civil War, Paula Losoya Taylor in 1862 was the first Anglo American to build a hacienda in the area.

San Felipe Springs, about 8 mi (13 km) east of the Rio Grande on the U.S. side of the border, has historically produced 90×10^{6} US gal (340,000 m^{3}) of water a day. This was critical to the arid region. Developers acquired several thousand acres of land adjacent to the springs, and to San Felipe Creek formed by the springs, from the state of Texas in exchange for building a canal system to irrigate the area.

The developers sold tracts of land surrounding the canals to recover their investment and show a profit. The initial investors (William C. Adams, Joseph M. Hudson, John P. Grove, Donald Jackson, John Perry, Joseph Ney, Randolph Pafford, A. O. Strickland, and James H Taylor) formed the San Felipe Agricultural, Manufacturing, and Irrigation Company in 1868. The organization completed construction of a network of irrigation canals in 1871 to support agriculture. Residents referred to the slowly developing town as San Felipe Del Rio. Local lore among the Tejanos said the name came from early Spanish explorers, who offered a mass at the site on St. Philip's Day, 1635.

In 1883, local residents requested a post office be established. The United States Postal Department shortened "San Felipe del Rio" to "Del Rio" to avoid confusion with San Felipe de Austin. In 1885, Val Verde County was organized, and Del Rio was designated as the county seat. The City of Del Rio was incorporated on November 15, 1911.

The San Felipe community was started by the Arteaga family. Arteaga Street and Arteaga Park are named after them. Together, the communities are still part of a rural region.

Ranchers and farmers recruited Mexican workers during the early decades of the 20th century, especially during World War II, when so many American men were at war. After the war, the government withdrew visas and deported workers, including some who were citizens, as well as children born here.

Like many border communities, Del Rio has been affected in the early 21st century by migrants arriving from Mexico and Central and South America. Migrants from the Caribbean have also crossed the border here.

In September 2021, about 30,000 Haitian migrants crossed the border at Del Rio. The United States Border Patrol moved many to a camp underneath the Del Río–Ciudad Acuña International Bridge. The squalid conditions in the camp attracted widespread national attention.

== Geography ==
According to the United States Census Bureau, the city has a total area of 52.3 km^{2} (20.2 sq mi), of which 52.2 km^{2} (20.2 sq mi) are land and 0.1 km^{2} (0.039 sq mi), or 0.24%, is covered by water.

Del Rio lies on the northwestern edges of the Tamaulipan mezquital, also called the South Texas brush country. It is also near the southwestern corner of the Edwards Plateau, which is the western fringe of the famous, oak savanna-covered Texas Hill Country; that area is dotted with numerous small springs; one of these is the San Felipe Springs, which provides a constant flow of water to San Felipe Creek. The creek supplied fresh water for drinking and irrigation to early settlers of Del Rio, and the springs are still the town's water supply.

The Del Rio region, to just west of the Pecos River, has a mix of desert shrub and steppe vegetation depending on soil type, with the gray-leafed cenizo (Leucophyllum spp.), several different acacias, cacti, and grama grasses dominant members of local flora. The terrain is mostly level, but some areas are dissected with substantial canyons and drainages, though none of the upland areas are elevated enough to be considered mountains.

=== Climate ===
Del Rio experiences a hot semiarid climate (Köppen BSh) with mild winters and hot, humid summers. High dewpoint temperatures occur during much of the warmer months, due to the terrain and prevailing surface winds from the southeast. In the spring and fall seasons, severe thunderstorms often build on the Serranías del Burro to the distant west of Del Rio, occasionally affecting Del Rio and uplands to the north. This occurs due to the uplift of moisture from the Gulf of Mexico that is channeled along the Rio Grande, combined with intense heating of lowland areas or frontal and dryline activity. Temperatures peak in late summer and then quickly drop during autumn.

Climate data for Del Rio International Airport, Texas (1991–2020 normals, (Note: Mean monthly maxima and minima (i.e. the highest and lowest temperature readings during an entire month or year) calculated based on data at said location from 1991 to 2020.) extremes 1905–present)
Month	Jan	Feb	Mar	Apr	May	Jun	Jul	Aug	Sep	Oct	Nov	Dec	Year
Record high °F (°C)	92 (33)	99 (37)	103 (39)	107 (42)	112 (44)	115 (46)	112 (44)	113 (45)	110 (43)	106 (41)	96 (36)	91 (33)	115 (46)
Mean maximum °F (°C)	81.4 (27.4)	87.4 (30.8)	92.1 (33.4)	97.9 (36.6)	102.0 (38.9)	103.3 (39.6)	104.4 (40.2)	104.1 (40.1)	100.2 (37.9)	94.6 (34.8)	85.4 (29.7)	80.0 (26.7)	106.9 (41.6)
Mean daily maximum °F (°C)	67.5 (19.7)	72.7 (22.6)	80.1 (26.7)	87.0 (30.6)	93.1 (33.9)	98.4 (36.9)	100.4 (38.0)	101.0 (38.3)	93.8 (34.3)	85.6 (29.8)	74.8 (23.8)	67.8 (19.9)	85.2 (29.5)
Daily mean °F (°C)	55.6 (13.1)	60.5 (15.8)	68.1 (20.1)	74.9 (23.8)	82.1 (27.8)	87.7 (30.9)	89.5 (31.9)	89.9 (32.2)	83.5 (28.6)	74.8 (23.8)	63.7 (17.6)	56.1 (13.4)	73.9 (23.3)
Mean daily minimum °F (°C)	43.6 (6.4)	48.4 (9.1)	56.1 (13.4)	62.8 (17.1)	71.1 (21.7)	77.0 (25.0)	78.7 (25.9)	78.8 (26.0)	73.3 (22.9)	64.1 (17.8)	52.5 (11.4)	44.3 (6.8)	62.6 (17.0)
Mean minimum °F (°C)	26.9 (−2.8)	29.8 (−1.2)	35.2 (1.8)	43.8 (6.6)	55.0 (12.8)	67.0 (19.4)	70.4 (21.3)	70.5 (21.4)	58.2 (14.6)	42.8 (6.0)	33.1 (0.6)	27.4 (−2.6)	24.4 (−4.2)
Record low °F (°C)	12 (−11)	11 (−12)	19 (−7)	33 (1)	45 (7)	49 (9)	63 (17)	60 (16)	43 (6)	28 (−2)	17 (−8)	10 (−12)	10 (−12)
Average precipitation inches (mm)	0.61 (15)	0.63 (16)	1.18 (30)	1.50 (38)	3.06 (78)	2.32 (59)	1.48 (38)	2.69 (68)	2.63 (67)	2.08 (53)	0.91 (23)	0.70 (18)	19.79 (503)
Average snowfall inches (cm)	0.0 (0.0)	0.1 (0.25)	0.0 (0.0)	0.0 (0.0)	0.0 (0.0)	0.0 (0.0)	0.0 (0.0)	0.0 (0.0)	0.0 (0.0)	0.0 (0.0)	0.0 (0.0)	0.0 (0.0)	0.1 (0.25)
Average precipitation days (≥ 0.01 in)	3.9	4.5	5.0	5.0	7.0	5.2	3.7	4.2	5.9	5.5	4.4	4.4	58.7
Average snowy days (≥ 0.1 in)	0.0	0.1	0.0	0.0	0.0	0.0	0.0	0.0	0.0	0.0	0.0	0.0	0.1
Source 1: NOAA
Source 2: National Weather Service

== Demographics ==
Historical population
Census	Pop.	Note	%±
1880	50		—
1890	1,980		3,860.0%
1900	2,098		6.0%
1910	5,688		171.1%
1920	10,589		86.2%
1930	11,693		10.4%
1940	13,343		14.1%
1950	14,211		6.5%
1960	18,612		31.0%
1970	21,330		14.6%
1980	30,034		40.8%
1990	30,705		2.2%
2000	33,867		10.3%
2010	35,591		5.1%
2020	34,673		−2.6%
U.S. Decennial Census

=== 2020 census ===
As of the 2020 census, Del Rio had a population of 34,673, 11,648 households, and 8,898 families residing in the city.

The median age was 35.3 years; 26.6% of residents were under 18 and 16.0% were 65 or older. For every 100 females, there were 98.0 males, and for every 100 females 18 and over, there were 96.6 males 18 and over.

Almost all of the residents lived in urban areas, while 0.9% lived in rural areas.

Of the 11,648 households in Del Rio, 38.4% had children under 18 living in them, 48.2% were married-couple households, 17.0% were households with a male householder and no spouse or partner present, and 30.0% were households with a female householder and no spouse or partner present. About 23.5% of all households were made up of individuals, and 11.5% had someone living alone who was 65 years of age or older.

The city had 13,041 housing units, of which 10.7% were vacant. The homeowner vacancy rate was 1.4% and the rental vacancy rate was 8.8%.

Racial composition as of the 2020 census
Race	Number	Percent
White	15,264	44.0%
Black or African American	481	1.4%
American Indian and Alaska Native	246	0.7%
Asian	267	0.8%
Native Hawaiian and other Pacific Islander	33	0.1%
Some other race	5,965	17.2%
Two or more races	12,417	35.8%
Hispanic or Latino (of any race)	29,074	83.9%

=== 2000 census ===
As of the 2000 census, 33,867 people, 10,778 households, and 8,514 families resided in the city. The population density was 2,194.0 inhabitants per square mile (847.1/km^{2}). The 11,895 housing units averaged a density of 770.6 per square mile (297.5/km^{2}). The racial makeup of the city was 13.05% White American, 7.21% African American, 0.70% Native American, 0.49% Asian, 0.06% Pacific Islander, 17.79% from other races, and 2.68% from two or more races. Hispanics or Latinos of any race were 81.04% of the population.

Of the 10,778 households, 42.0% had children under 18 living with them, 59.3% were married couples living together, 15.8% had a female householder with no husband present, and 21.0% were not families. About 18.7% of all households were made up of individuals, and 8.4% had someone living alone who was 65 or older. The average household size was 3.09, and the average family size was 3.56.

In the city, the population was distributed as 31.7% under 18, 8.8% from 18 to 24, 27.6% from 25 to 44, 20.2% from 45 to 64, and 11.7% who were 65 or older. The median age was 32 years. For every 100 females, there were 94.0 males. For every 100 females 18 and over, there were 89.6 males.

The median income in the city for a household was $27,387 and for a family was $30,788. Males had a median income of $27,255 versus $17,460 for females. The per capita income for the city was $12,199. About 22.9% of families and 27.0% of the population were below the poverty line, including 35.8% of those under 18 and 26.4% of those 65 or over.

=== Micropolitan area ===
Del Rio is the principal city of the Del Rio micropolitan statistical area, which includes all of Val Verde County; the micropolitan area had an estimated population over 50,000 in 2007. Located across from Del Rio, in the Mexican state of Coahuila, is the city of Ciudad Acuña, with a city population of 201,161.

== Economy ==
=== Laughlin Air Force Base ===
In 1942, the Army Air Corps opened Laughlin Field 9 mi (14 km) east of Del Rio, as a training base for the Martin B-26, but the base was deactivated in 1945. As the Cold War pressures built, along with new border-control issues, Laughlin Field was rebuilt and renamed Laughlin Air Force Base and was again used as a home for flight training. Laughlin plays a large part in the Del Rio community as the area's largest employer. Today, Laughlin Air Force Base is the largest pilot-training base in the Air Force.

=== Val Verde Correctional Facility ===
The GEO Group, a private correctional facility corporation based in Boca Raton, Florida, manages the Val Verde Correctional Facility in Del Rio. It has a contract to house offenders for the county, U.S. Marshals Service (male/female) prisoners, and U.S. Customs and Border Protection detainees. The facility opened in 2001 with 688 beds. In 2007, the facility was expanded to its current capacity of 1,400 beds. It is one of the major employers in the Del Rio area and meets standards required by state and federal guidelines.

== Arts and culture ==
Some of the earliest surviving cultural artefacts in the region are various pictographs found in local caverns in and near the town. Some of these pictographs date back 4,200 years, when the people of precontact cultures in the region created pictographs in the caverns of the Lower Pecos Canyonlands Archeological District, a proposed National Historic Landmark. The pictographs are preserved in part by the Shumla Archaeological Research and Education Center, a local group that documents the pictographs, and creates educational material about them.

The Whitehead Memorial Museum carries on the history of the culture created in Del Rio. It also includes mementos of Judge Roy Bean.

The Laughlin Heritage Museum Foundation educates the public about the importance of air power in sustaining the national security of the United States, and to preserve the heritage of Laughlin Air Force Base.

Del Rio is home to the oldest continuously running winery in Texas, the Val Verde Winery. The winery was established in 1883 by Italian immigrant Frank Qualia. He brought with him his family tradition of winemaking. Today, the winery is operated by third-generation vintner Thomas Qualia.

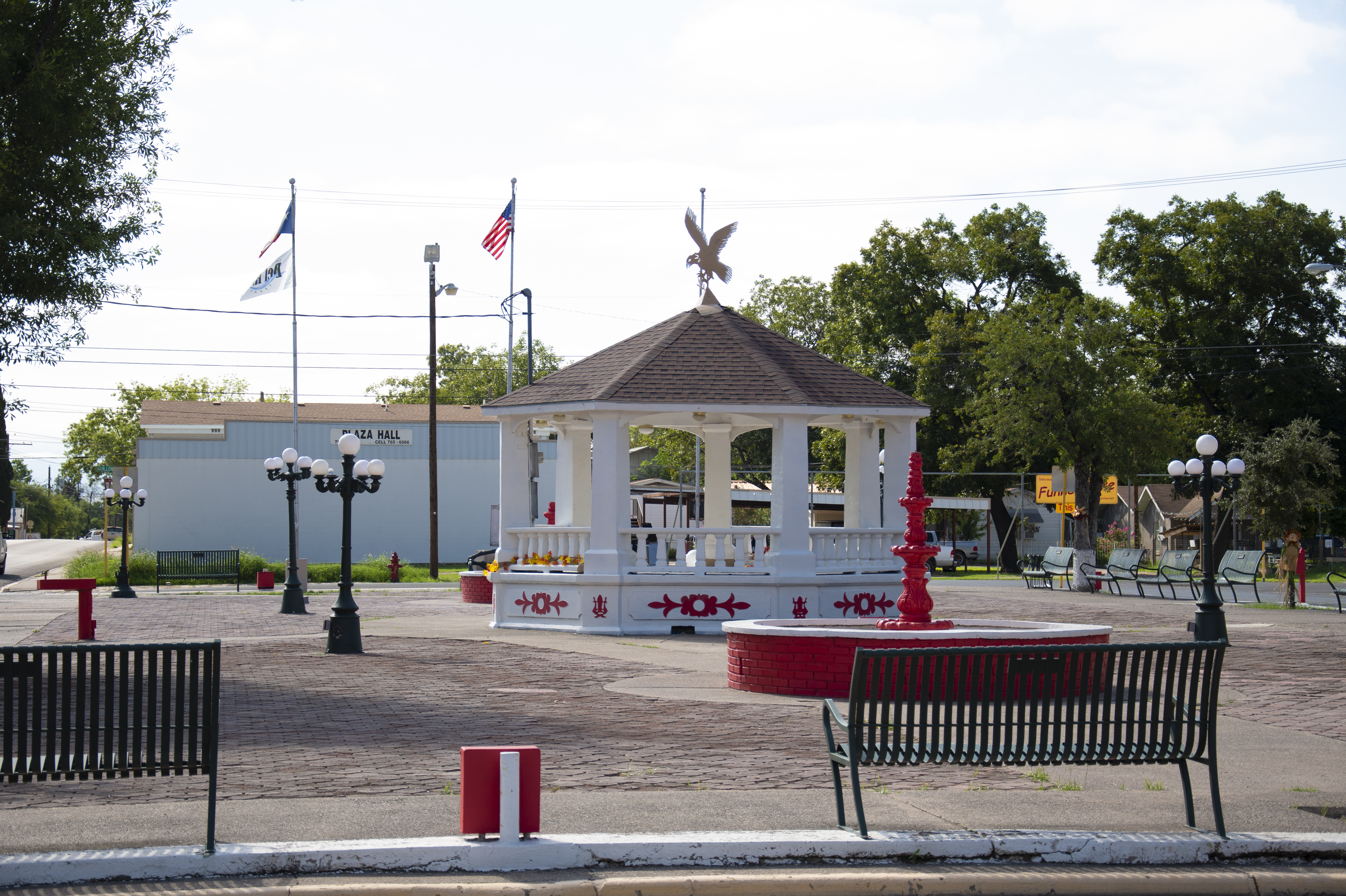
Brown Plaza in Del Rio

A cultural melting pot, Del Rio is home to people of a mix of ethnic and racial backgrounds, including Hispanic, black Seminole, mestizo, and Tejano.

Del Rio offers a variety of Southwestern cuisines, including Tex-Mex, steakhouses, barbecue, authentic Mexican food, and pan dulce or Mexican pastries.

The Upstagers have been performing award-winning live theater in Del Rio since 1977.

The Casa de la Cultural is a nonprofit organization that has provided community-focused outlets for the youth and adults in Del Rio for over 40 years. It offers a revolving variety of classes based on the educational and cultural needs of the community, such as: Ballet Folklórico, guitar, singing, knitting, pottery, art camps, Latino aerobics, and literacy classes. In the early 2000s, the Casa de la Cultura began Noches Musicales, a live summer music festival with food vendors and live music. The Casa de la Cultura celebrated its 14th annual Live Music Festival in June 2021.

The Del Rio Council for the Arts provides affordable arts and education and entertainment to the community and its surrounding areas.

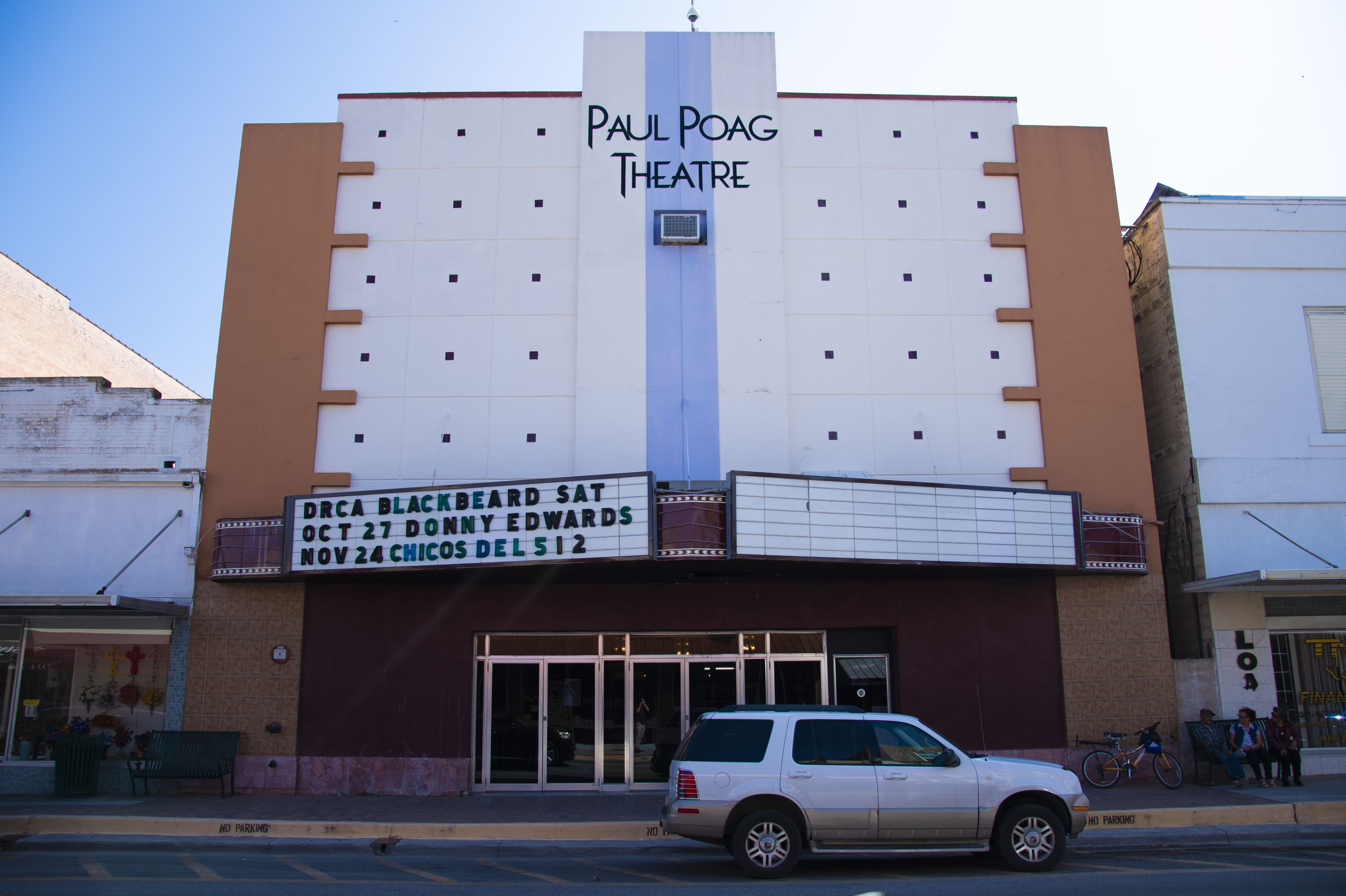
Paul Poag Theatre

Del Rio is home to the annual event of the George Paul Memorial Bull Riding, which is the oldest such stand-alone event in the world.

Some of the most notable celebrations in the community include: Cinco de Mayo, the July 4th Independence Day City-Wide Celebration, 16 de Septiembre, Fiesta de Amistad, and the Fiesta of Flight Air Show. Del Rio held its first ever Pride event in June 2019.

Del Rio is home to consulates of Guatemala and Mexico.

The area is home to various religious groups including: Christian, Baptist, Catholic, Episcopal, Evangelical, Lutheran, Methodist, Non-Denominational, Pentecostal, Presbyterian, Spirit-Filled, Judaism, Seventh-Day Adventist, and many more.

== Education ==
The city is served by the San Felipe Del Rio Consolidated Independent School District. About 10,450 students are enrolled and 637 teachers are employed at 14 campuses throughout the district. Del Rio is also home to Del Rio Heritage Academy High School, and Premier High School, two charter schools.

=== Higher education ===
Two four-year universities have campuses in Del Rio: Sul Ross State University and Park University.

Southwest Texas Junior College, a two-year community college, has a campus in Del Rio.

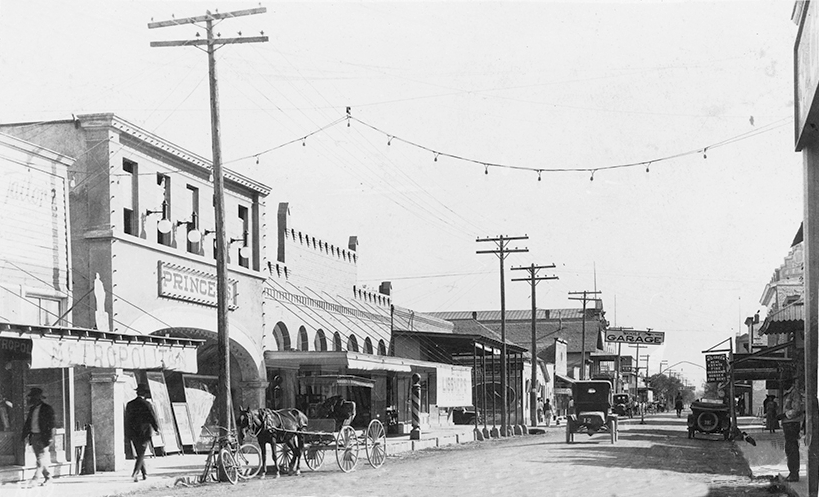
Main Street, circa 1910-1930

== Media ==
=== Print ===
The Del Rio News-Herald was a daily newspaper published in Del Rio, covering Val Verde County, and was owned by Southern Newspapers Inc. The newspaper had a daily circulation of 10,400 and a Sunday circulation of 13,500. After disruption and losses during the first year of the COVID-19 pandemic, the newspaper closed in November 2020.

=== Radio ===
Multiple radio stations are licensed to the area in and around Del Rio, including KDLK-FM, KTDR, KVFE, KWMC, KDRN, KTPD, and KDLI.

In 2014, KVFE, a Christian station owned by Inspiracom, was launched to fill one of the ministry's remaining gaps on the US–Mexico border.

In 2016, Texas Public Radio opened a transmitter in Del Rio.

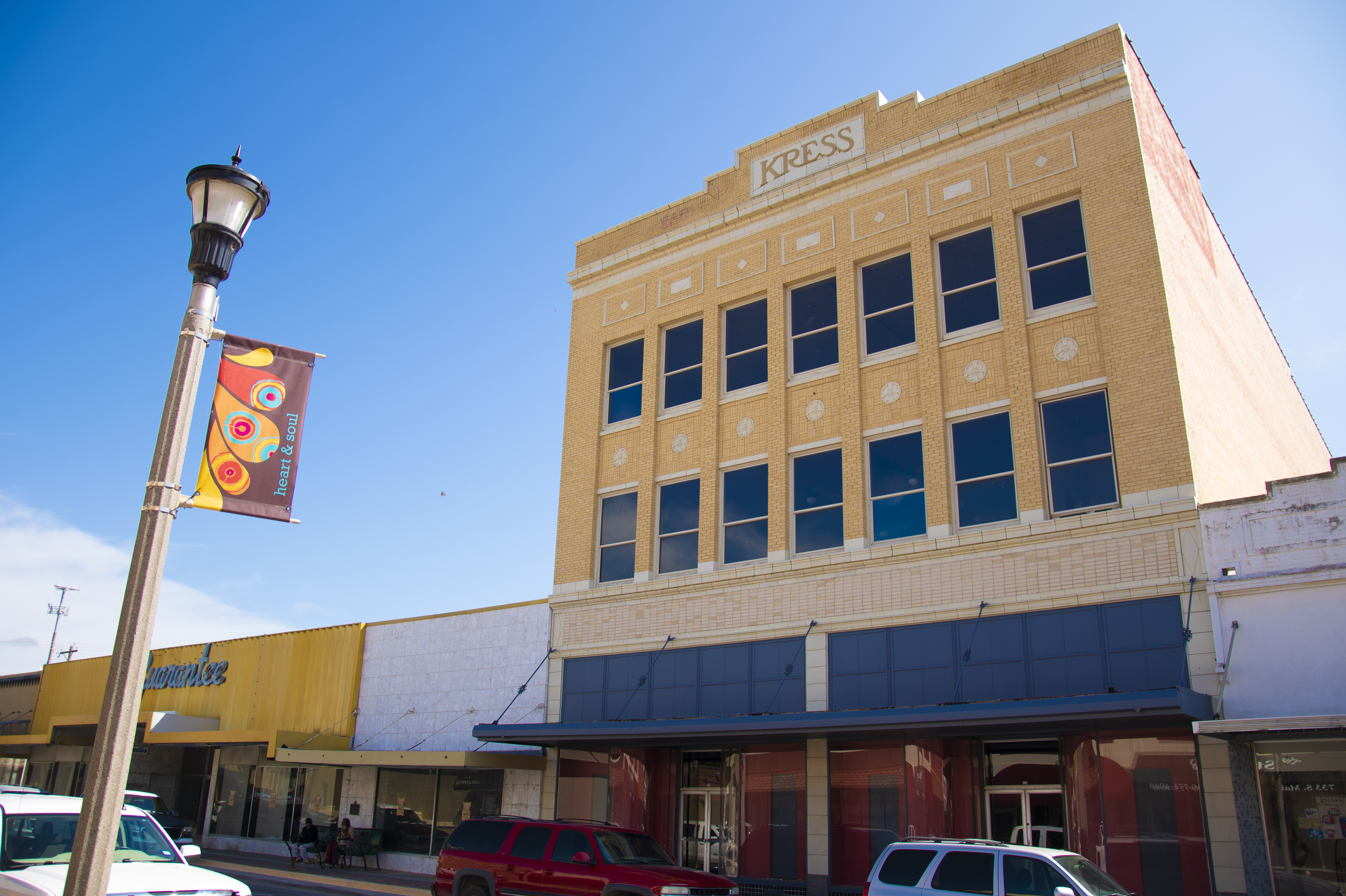
Kress Building

=== Digital ===
In 2020, The 830 Times launched. It is a local news website covering Del Rio and the wider region of Southwest Texas.

== Infrastructure ==
=== Transportation ===
Del Rio International Airport (FlyDRT) serves the city and surrounding area. American Airlines has operated flights twice daily between Del Rio and Dallas/Fort Worth International Airport in the past. The route is currently served by two cargo airlines. On January 5, 2023, the City of Del Rio announced that American Airlines was to terminate service to DRT effective April 3, 2023, leaving the area without scheduled air passenger service.

Transportation services to the citizens of Del Rio is provided by the City of Del Río Transportation Department.

Amtrak provides passenger rail service to Del Rio Station through its combined Sunset Limited/Texas Eagle service. Trains serve the station thrice-weekly in each direction, with direct service to Los Angeles, San Antonio, New Orleans, Chicago, and points in between.

=== Major highways ===
- US 90 connects with Alpine, Marfa, and Van Horn to the west and Uvalde and San Antonio to the east.
- US 277 connects with San Angelo to the north and Crystal City and Laredo (via US 83 south) to the southeast.
- US 377 crosses sparsely populated West Texas through several small towns before eventually reaching Fort Worth.
- Loop 79 in Val Verde County and Del Rio, known as a Super Two Loop, opened for traffic in mid-May 2012. It connects with US 90, US 277, and US 377; Loop 79 is part of the Ports to Plain Corridor Infrastructure and the future I-27 that extends from Laredo to Raton, New Mexico.
- Spur 239
- Spur 297

== Notable people ==
- Jessica Alba (born 1981), actress, was a resident when her father was stationed at Laughlin AFB.
- Consuelo González Amezcua (1903–1975), outsider artist and poet
- William Beckmann (born 1995), country music singer-songwriter
- Lance Blanks (1966–2023), NBA player
- Larvell Blanks (born 1950), MLB infielder
- Sid Blanks (1941–2021), halfback for the Houston Oilers and Boston Patriots
- John R. Brinkley (1885–1942), quack doctor and radio pioneer
- Radney Foster (born 1959), country music singer-songwriter
- Bob Gruber (born 1958), retired offensive tackle in the NFL and USFL
- Todd Hays (born 1969), bobsledder who won the silver medal at the 2002 Winter Olympics
- Cory James (born 1993), NFL football player for the Oakland Raiders
- Jay Kerr (born 1948), actor who has appeared in various movies and television series
- Jack Mayfield (born 1990), an American MLB infielder
- Shawn Michaels (born 1965), a professional wrestler
- Evelyn Peirce (1907–1960), actress
- Jeremy Silman (1954–2023), chess player
- Jerry Edwin Smith (born 1946), judge of the United States Court of Appeals for the Fifth Circuit
- Byron Velvick (born 1964), professional fisherman and reality show contestant
- Hoke Hayden "Hooks" Warner (1894–1947), MLB player for the Chicago Cubs and Pittsburgh Pirates
