= KUWL =

Jazz radio station licensed to Laramie, Wyoming, US

- Laramie, Wyoming; United States
- Broadcast area: Laramie, Wyoming
- Frequency: 90.1 MHz
- Branding: Jazz Wyoming

Programming
- Format: Jazz

Ownership
- Owner: University of Wyoming
- Sister stations: KUWR, KUWY

History
- First air date: 2008

Technical information
- Licensing authority: FCC
- Facility ID: 91563
- Class: A
- ERP: 110 watts
- HAAT: 295 meters (968 ft)
- Transmitter coordinates: 41°18′36″N 105°27′17″W

Links
- Public license information: Public file; LMS
- Webcast: Listen live
- Website: wyomingpublicmedia.org

KUWL (90.1 FM) is a radio station licensed to Laramie, Wyoming, United States, featuring a jazz format. The station is part of Wyoming Public Radio, a division of Wyoming Public Media. It serves the Laramie area and is currently owned by University of Wyoming. KUWL broadcasts 24 hours a day, seven days a week, is commercial-free, and offers NPR News updates hourly. The station plays the music of both new and established artists and offers live streaming on its website.

== See also ==
- List of jazz radio stations in the United States
