= KUMX =

- Fort Johnson North, Louisiana; United States
- Broadcast area: Leesville, Louisiana, DeRidder and surrounding areas
- Frequency: 106.7 MHz
- Branding: Mix 106.7

Programming
- Format: Adult contemporary

Ownership
- Owner: West Central Broadcasting Inc
- Sister stations: KROK, KVVP

History
- First air date: 1995 (as KCIJ)
- Former call signs: KCIJ (1995–2002)
- Call sign meaning: K U MiX - Name alluding to the format

Technical information
- Licensing authority: FCC
- Facility ID: 57668
- Class: A
- ERP: 6,000 watts
- HAAT: 96 meters
- Transmitter coordinates: 31°03′05.00″N 93°16′41.00″W

Links
- Public license information: Public file; LMS
- Webcast: Listen Live
- Website: kumxfm.com

KUMX (106.7 FM) is an American radio station broadcasting an adult contemporary format. Licensed to Fort Johnson North, Louisiana, United States, the station serves the area surrounding Fort Johnson and Vernon parish and surrounding areas. The station is currently owned by West Central Broadcasting

== History ==
This station originally was assigned a Construction permit in 1988, but apparently due to delays and such did not get fully licensed until 1995. West Central Broadcasting Co., Inc., purchased the station in 2002.
