= KUQQ =

Coordinates: 43°24′20″N 95°05′01″W

- Milford, Iowa; United States
- Broadcast area: Okoboji, Iowa
- Frequency: 102.1 MHz
- Branding: Q102

Programming
- Format: Classic rock

Ownership
- Owner: Community First Broadcasting, LLC

History
- First air date: 1996

Technical information
- Licensing authority: FCC
- Facility ID: 60002
- Class: C2
- ERP: 50,000 watts
- HAAT: 128 meters (420 ft)

Links
- Public license information: Public file; LMS
- Webcast: Listen live
- Website: kuqqfm.com

KUQQ is a radio station airing a classic rock format licensed to Milford, Iowa, broadcasting on 102.1 FM. It is branded as "Q102, Okoboji's Best Rock". The station serves the areas of Okoboji, Iowa, Spencer, Iowa, Worthington, Minnesota, and Estherville, Iowa, and is owned by Community First Broadcasting, LLC. The station studios are in Spirit Lake with sister stations KUOO and KUYY.
