= KUWW =

- Fort Washakie, Wyoming; United States
- Frequency: 90.9 MHz
- Branding: Wyoming Public Radio

Programming
- Format: Public radio, classical, jazz and AAA
- Affiliations: Wyoming Public Radio, NPR

Ownership
- Owner: University of Wyoming

History
- Former call signs: KFTW (2008–2012)

Technical information
- Licensing authority: FCC
- Facility ID: 174336
- Class: C3
- ERP: 8,000 watts
- HAAT: 151 meters (495 ft)
- Transmitter coordinates: 42°54′27″N 108°44′50″W

Links
- Public license information: Public file; LMS
- Webcast: Listen live
- Website: wyomingpublicmedia.org

KUWW (90.9 FM) is a radio station licensed to Fort Washakie, Wyoming, United States. The station is currently owned by the University of Wyoming and is an affiliate of Wyoming Public Radio.
