= KBWW =

- Broken Bow, Oklahoma; United States
- Broadcast area: Idabel, Oklahoma
- Frequency: 88.3 MHz
- Branding: The Gospel Station

Programming
- Format: Southern Gospel
- Affiliations: KTGS, KVAZ, KIMY, KOSG, WRCC, KCBK

Ownership
- Owner: Golden Baptist Church

Technical information
- Licensing authority: FCC
- Facility ID: 177112
- Class: C3
- ERP: 3,400 watts
- HAAT: 210 meters (690 ft)
- Transmitter coordinates: 34°12′31.40″N 94°46′58.80″W

Links
- Public license information: Public file; LMS
- Webcast: live
- Website: https://thegospelstation.com

KBWW (88.3 FM, "The Gospel Station") is an American radio station broadcasting a southern gospel format. Licensed to Broken Bow, Oklahoma, the station is owned by the Golden Baptist Church.

== History ==
This station was assigned call sign KBWW on February 6, 2009. Went on the air in October 2011. The Paris, TX station went on the air in June 2007.

== Translators ==
Broadcast translator for KBWW
Call sign	Frequency	City of license	FID	ERP (W)	HAAT	Class	FCC info
K274BA	(102.7 MHz) FM	Paris, Texas	156963	250	86 m (282 ft)	D	LMS
