= KUOO =

- Spirit Lake, Iowa; United States
- Broadcast area: Iowa Great Lakes Area
- Frequency: 103.9 MHz
- Branding: FM 104 Campus Radio

Programming
- Format: Adult contemporary
- Affiliations: Fox News Radio

Ownership
- Owner: Community First Broadcasting
- Sister stations: KUQQ, KUYY

History
- First air date: April 1, 1985
- Call sign meaning: University of OkobOji

Technical information
- Licensing authority: FCC
- Facility ID: 8502
- Class: C2
- ERP: 50,000 Watts
- HAAT: 150 meters
- Transmitter coordinates: 43°24′20″N 95°05′01″W

Links
- Public license information: Public file; LMS
- Webcast: Listen Live
- Website: kuooradio.com

KUOO (103.9 FM) is a radio station that broadcasts an adult contemporary format. Licensed to Spirit Lake, Iowa, United States, it serves the Iowa Great Lakes Area. KUOO is owned by Community First Broadcasting (as of January 1, 2010). The station shares a studio location with sister station KUQQ in Spirit Lake.

== Founding and Early History ==
KUOO was founded in the early 1980s by Paul Hedberg, owner of several radio stations in southern Minnesota and northern Iowa (including KBEW, KQAD, KEEZ, KLSS, and KRIB). Hedberg recounts the impetus for KUOO in his autobiography, The Time of My Life: "Dickinson County, Iowa, had a resident population of 16,000 but during summer months that ballooned to 34,000 – and to as many as 80,000 on weekends. With this in mind, I filed an application with the FCC in the summer of 1983 for a construction permit to operate a new station on 103.9 MHz."

A competing application with the FCC, coupled with difficulties finding a tower location that would satisfy the FAA, delayed the construction of KUOO for roughly two years. Hedberg recalls the process that led to the station's name: "I came up with two ideas for call letters: KIGL (for “Iowa Great Lakes”) and KUOO (for “University of Okoboji”), based on the idea of Herman and Emil Richter, who owned The Three Sons clothing store in Milford. The brothers had built a cottage industry selling all sorts of clothing and novelties with the seal of their fictitious University." Hedberg settled on KUOO, and organized the station as the Campus Radio Company.

KUOO leveraged this connection with this non-existent university in its earliest advertising packages: "The idea was to solicit local businesses to be part of the Kickoff Team of the Fighting Phantoms at the University of Okoboji, and they would be major sponsors for our coverage of the annual football game between the University of Okoboji and Notre Dame each September 31st," accompanied by "jingles that tied in to the theme, [that used] cheerleader IDs in cadence with our call letters: “K-U-O-O…OK-O-BO-JI!!” The prevailing gimmick of “On-Campus Radio” originating from this spurious “Blue Water Alma Mater” proved a great success.
