= KUWR =

Wyoming Public Radio station in Laramie, Wyoming

- Laramie, Wyoming; United States
- Broadcast area: Laramie, Wyoming; Cheyenne, Wyoming
- Frequency: 91.9 MHz (HD Radio)
- Branding: Wyoming Public Radio

Programming
- Format: Public radio
- Subchannels: HD2: Classical music
- Affiliations: Wyoming Public Radio, NPR

Ownership
- Owner: University of Wyoming; (University of Wyoming)
- Sister stations: KUWL, KUWY

History
- First air date: 1966

Technical information
- Licensing authority: FCC
- Facility ID: 69131
- Class: C0
- ERP: 100,000 watts
- HAAT: 335 meters (1,099 ft)
- Transmitter coordinates: 41°18′36″N 105°27′17″W
- Translators: 90.9 K215FF (Rock Springs); 94.3 K232CU (Green River); 103.5 K278CM (Laramie)

Links
- Public license information: Public file; LMS
- Webcast: Listen live
- Website: wyomingpublicmedia.org

KUWR (91.9 FM) is a radio station licensed to Laramie, Wyoming, United States. Owned by the University of Wyoming, it is the flagship of Wyoming Public Radio (WPR), airing a format consisting of news, jazz, adult album alternative and classical music. The station's tower is located east of Laramie on Pilot Hill.

== History ==
KUWR received its license in 1966, and went on air for the fall semester. The station broadcast from the student union. In 1966, then University President John King encouraged the station to be used for sports broadcasts. KUWR was Wyoming's second FM radio station, and was initially 10 watts, on 91.5 MHz. The station moved to 91.9 and increased power to 50,000 watts in April 1977. It was at that time that the studios were moved to Knight Hall where they remain today.

In the late 1970s, KUWR began to pick up programming from National Public Radio, including All Things Considered. In the 1980s, network staples like Morning Edition and A Prairie Home Companion were added to the lineup. In the mid-1980s, translators of KUWR were put on air in Casper, and Aspen, Colorado. Demand for the radio network began to grow statewide, along with construction permits for new stations. KUWR's translator in Casper was limited to 10 watts, and the signal was unreliable due to wind issues. It was thought that a state-wide network could be built in 10 years.
