= KUWY =

- Laramie, Wyoming; United States
- Broadcast area: Laramie, Wyoming
- Frequency: 88.5 MHz
- Branding: Classical Wyoming

Programming
- Format: Classical
- Affiliations: University of Wyoming, National Public Radio

Ownership
- Owner: University of Wyoming
- Sister stations: KUWR, KUWL

History
- First air date: 2008

Technical information
- Licensing authority: FCC
- Facility ID: 91583
- Class: A
- ERP: 135 watts
- HAAT: 298 meters (978 ft)
- Transmitter coordinates: 41°18′36″N 105°27′17″W

Links
- Public license information: Public file; LMS
- Webcast: Stream
- Website: wyomingpublicmedia.org

KUWY (88.5 FM) is a classical music radio station licensed to Laramie, Wyoming, United States. The station is currently owned by the University of Wyoming.
