= KCBK =

Radio station in Frederick–Lawton, Oklahoma

- Frederick, Oklahoma; United States
- Broadcast area: Lawton, Oklahoma; Wichita Falls, Texas
- Frequency: 91.5 MHz

Programming
- Format: Southern gospel
- Affiliations: The Gospel Station Network

Ownership
- Owner: South Central Oklahoma Christian Broadcasting, Inc.
- Sister stations: KTGS, KIMY, KVAZ, KOSG, KBWW,

History
- First air date: July 1992
- Former call signs: KSYE (1992–2014)

Technical information
- Licensing authority: FCC
- Facility ID: 14520
- Class: C1
- ERP: 100,000 watts
- HAAT: 155 meters (509 ft)
- Transmitter coordinates: 34°21′52.30″N 98°50′05.20″W

Links
- Public license information: Public file; LMS
- Webcast: Listen live
- Website: thegospelstation.com

KCBK is a Southern Gospel station licensed to Frederick, Oklahoma, broadcasting on 91.5 FM. The station serves the areas of Lawton, Oklahoma, and Wichita Falls, Texas, and is owned by South Central Oklahoma Christian Broadcasting, Inc.

== History ==
The station began broadcasting in July 1992, and held the call sign KSYE. KSYE was owned by Criswell College and aired Christian music, as well as Christian talk and teaching shows such as Back to the Bible with Woodrow Kroll, Insight for Living with Chuck Swindoll, Revive Our Hearts with Nancy Leigh DeMoss, and Turning Point with David Jeremiah. In 2010, Criswell College's radio stations were transferred to First Dallas Media as part of the school's separation from the First Baptist Church of Dallas.

In 2014, the station's call sign was changed to KCBK. In August 2018, the station was sold to South Central Oklahoma Christian Broadcasting for $250,000, and it began airing a southern gospel format as an affiliate of The Gospel Station Network.
