= KVAR (FM) =

- Pine Ridge, South Dakota; United States
- Frequency: 93.7 MHz
- Branding: Alley Cat 93

Programming
- Format: Classic rock

Ownership
- Owner: Alleycat Communications

History
- First air date: 2008

Technical information
- Licensing authority: FCC
- Facility ID: 164093
- Class: C3
- ERP: 12,000 watts
- HAAT: 146 meters (479 ft)
- Transmitter coordinates: 42°49′47″N 102°39′8″W
- Repeaters: KCFD (88.1 MHz, Crawford, NE); KVKR (88.7 MHz, Pine Ridge)

Links
- Public license information: Public file; LMS

KVAR (93.7 FM, "Alley Cat 93") is a non-commercial educational radio station broadcasting a classic rock music format. Licensed to serve the community of Pine Ridge, South Dakota, United States, the station is currently owned by Alleycat Communications.

== History ==
The Federal Communications Commission issued a construction permit for the station on August 4, 2005. The station was assigned the KVAR call sign on August 29, 2005, and received its license to cover on September 23, 2008.

Attesting that it had aired no paid commercials since it was licensed and that it had arranged a partnership with a local college, KVAR applied in November 2008 to become a non-commercial educational station. The FCC granted this request on December 18, 2008.
