= KVAZ =

- Henryetta, Oklahoma; United States
- Frequency: 91.5 MHz

Programming
- Format: Southern Gospel

Ownership
- Owner: South Central Oklahoma Christian Broadcasting, Inc.
- Sister stations: KIMY, KOSG, KTGS, KBWW, KCBK

History
- First air date: February 27, 1985; 40 years ago

Technical information
- Licensing authority: FCC
- Facility ID: 26970
- Class: C3
- ERP: 7,800 watts
- HAAT: 172 meters (564 ft)
- Transmitter coordinates: 35°32′53.00″N 95°58′14.00″W

Links
- Public license information: Public file; LMS
- Webcast: Listen Live
- Website: thegospelstation.com

KVAZ (91.5 FM) is a non-commercial, listener-supported radio station licensed to Henryetta, Oklahoma. It is owned by South Central Oklahoma Christian Broadcasting, Inc. It airs a Southern gospel format with some Christian talk and teaching programs.

== History ==
This station was assigned call sign KVAZ on February 27, 1985. Went on the air with The Gospel Station in July 2005.
