= KTGS =

Radio station in Tishomingo–Ada, Oklahoma

- Tishomingo, Oklahoma; United States
- Broadcast area: Tishomingo, Oklahoma
- Frequency: 88.3 MHz (HD Radio via KWFF-HD4)
- Branding: "The Gospel Station"

Programming
- Format: Southern Gospel

Ownership
- Owner: Randall Christy; (South Central Oklahoma Christian Broadcasting, Inc.)
- Sister stations: KVAZ, KIMY, KOSG, KBWW, KCBK

History
- Former call signs: KAZC (December 9, 1997-November 1, 2008)
- Call sign meaning: "The Gospel Station"

Technical information
- Licensing authority: FCC
- Facility ID: 85337
- Class: C2
- ERP: 5,500 watts
- HAAT: 281.0 meters (921.9 ft)
- Transmitter coordinates: 34°21′34″N 96°33′34″W

Links
- Public license information: Public file; LMS
- Webcast: Listen Live
- Website: thegospelstation.com

KTGS (The Gospel Station Network) (88.3 FM) is a radio station in Ada, Oklahoma; licensed to nearby Tishomingo. The station is currently owned by local pastor Randall Christy and his company, South Central Oklahoma Christian Broadcasting.

The flagship of The Gospel Station network, KTGS broadcasts a southern gospel format.

They play southern gospel music from artists like The Gaither Vocal Band, Karen Peck & New River, Ernie Haase & Signature Sound, Triumphant Quartet, The Crabb Family, Greater Vision, Jeff & Sheri Easter, The Kingsmen, The Nelons, The Isaacs, plus they play lots of classic songs and artists such as The Hinsons, The Happy Goodmans, The Cathedrals, and more.

== Stations ==
In addition to KTGS, The Gospel Station Network airs on 9 additional full powered stations and 6 low powered translators. The bulk of its network is located in Oklahoma, and spreads across portions of the Tulsa, Oklahoma City, and Lawton markets. With stations that also cover Wichita Falls, Paris, and Amarillo, Texas.

Call sign	Frequency	City of license	State	Facility ID	Class	ERP (W)	FCC info
KBWW	88.3 FM	Broken Bow	Oklahoma	177112	C3	3,400	FCC (KBWW)
KWFF-HD4	99.7-4 FM (HD)	Mustang	Oklahoma	37123	C2	47,000 (analog)	FCC (KWFF)
KCBK	91.5 FM	Frederick	Oklahoma	14520	C1	100,000	FCC (KCBK)
KVAZ	91.5 FM	Henryetta	Oklahoma	26970	C3	7,800	FCC (KVAZ)
KOSG	103.9 FM	Pawhuska	Oklahoma	56088	A	6,000	FCC (KOSG)
KIMY	93.9 FM	Watonga	Oklahoma	69913	A	6,000	FCC (KIMY)
WRCC	88.3 FM	Dibrell	Tennessee	176989	A	85	FCC (WRCC)
KBZD-HD4	99.7-4 FM (HD)	Amarillo	Texas	33449	C3	22,000 (analog)	FCC (KBZD)

=== Low powered translators ===
Call sign	Frequency	City of license	FID	ERP (W)	Class	FCC info
K286BB	105.1 FM	Ada, Oklahoma	150396	75	D	LMS
K261CR	100.1 FM	Chickasha, Oklahoma	142416	250	D	LMS
K297BB	107.3 FM	Edmond, Oklahoma	156917	190	D	LMS
K268BR	101.5 FM	Oklahoma City, Oklahoma	139288	99	D	LMS
K274BA	102.7 FM	Paris, Texas	156963	250	D	LMS
K284BH	104.7 FM	Amarillo, Texas	142022	99	D	LMS

K261CR/K297BB/K268BR rebroadcasts KWFF-HD4. K284BH rebroadcasts KBZD-HD4.

== History ==
This station was assigned call sign KAZC on December 8, 1997, changing to KTGS on November 1, 2008.

Here is a timeline:

December 1998

Our FIRST station was in Ada, OK KTGS 89.9 (later changed to 89.5FM)

Summer 2000

Began online streaming

July 2002

KTGS 88.3 FM Tishomingo, OK

January 2004

KIMY 93.9 FM Watonga, OK

July 2005

KVAZ 91.5 FM Henryetta, OK

June 2007

K274BA 102.7 FM Paris, TX

September 2007

K286BB 105.1 FM Ada, OK

2008

K286BR 101.5 FM OKC, OK

December 2009

KOSG 103.9 FM Bartlesville, OK

2010

K297BB 107.3 FM Edmond, OK

January 2011

WRCC 88.3 FM Dibrell, TN

Summer 2011

App for Apple devices was created

October 2011

KBWW 88.3 FM Broken Bow, OK

Fall 2013

App for Android phones was built

Fall 2016

Apple CarPlay and Android Auto Added

August 2018

KCBK 91.5 FM Wichita Falls, TX (Frederick, OK)

Fall 2018

Began broadcasting on Alexa

January 2019

K261CR 100.1 FM Chickasha, OK

January 2021

K284BH 104.7 FM/KBZD-HD4 99.7 FM Amarillo, TX

November 2022

ROKU streaming for Smart TVs was added

December 2022

KWFF-HD4 99.7 FM OKC, OK

December 2023

Apple TV, Fire TV, Google TV, & Android TV was added

The timeline is in a new magazine called 25 Years of The Gospel Station Network Concerts & Events 2024.
