= 102.3 FM =

FM radio frequency

The following radio stations broadcast on FM frequency 102.3 MHz:

== Argentina ==
- Aspen in Buenos Aires
- LRI732 Shock in Carcarañá, Santa Fe

== Australia ==
- ABC Classic in Canberra, Australian Capital Territory
- 5ADD in Adelaide, South Australia
- 2ROX in Port Macquarie, New South Wales
- 3RBA in Ballarat, Victoria

== Canada (Channel 272) ==
- CBAF-FM-1 in Saint John, New Brunswick
- CBCI-FM in Fort Albany, Ontario
- CBCY-FM in Haileybury, Ontario
- CBE-1-FM in Windsor, Ontario
- CBMX-FM in St-August-Saguenay, Quebec
- CBON-FM-29 in Marathon, Ontario
- CBYA-FM in Aiyansh, British Columbia
- CHSN-FM in Estevan, Saskatchewan
- CHST-FM in London, Ontario
- CIAK-FM in Lytton, British Columbia
- CIGB-FM in Trois-Rivieres, Quebec
- CINQ-FM in Montreal, Quebec
- CJNR-FM in Windsor, Ontario
- CJNS-FM in Meadow Lake, Saskatchewan
- CKJJ-FM in Belleville, Ontario
- CKNO-FM in Edmonton, Alberta
- CKRX-FM in Fort Nelson, British Columbia
- CKWV-FM in Nanaimo, British Columbia
- CKXG-FM in Grand Falls-Windsor, Newfoundland and Labrador
- CKY-FM in Winnipeg, Manitoba
- VF2378 in Campbell Road, British Columbia
- VF2454 in Muskey River Mine, Alberta
- VF7044 in Musselwhite Mine Site, Ontario

== China ==
- CNR Cross-Strait Radio in Fuzhou, Putian and east of Quanzhou
- CNR Music Radio in Daqing
- CNR The Voice of China in Jinzhou

== France ==
- Oui FM at Paris

== Indonesia ==
- Hijrah Radio in Batam and Singapore

== Malaysia ==
- Melaka FM in Malacca and Northern Johor
- My in Kota Bharu, Kelantan
- Raaga in Alor Setar, Kedah, Perlis & Penang
- TraXX FM in Brunei & Limbang, Sarawak

== Mexico ==
- XHAGE-FM in Acapulco, Guerrero
- XHANU-FM in Autlán de Navarro, Jalisco
- XHCCAB-FM in Cabo San Lucas, Baja California Sur
- XHCSBR-FM in Ixtlán del Río, Nayarit
- XHCST-FM in Castaños, Coahuila
- XHFEL-FM in San Felipe de Jesús, Sonora
- XHGEC-FM in Ciudad Acuña, Coahuila
- XHIPM-FM in Mérida, Yucatán
- XHMW-FM in Nuevo Laredo, Tamaulipas
- XHOO-FM in Guanajuato, Guanajuato
- XHPEEN-FM in Sabinas, Coahuila
- XHSCDQ-FM in Guadalajara, Jalisco
- XHSCJH-FM in Axochiapan, Morelos
- XHSIBX-FM in San Andrés Chicahuaxtla, Putla Villa De Guerrero Municipality, Oaxaca
- XHSMC-FM in Sierra Mojada, Coahuila
- XHSPP-FM in San Pedro Pochutla, Oaxaca
- XHTSC-FM in Cananea, Sonora

== Philippines ==
- DZYB in Baguio City
- Care FM in Mamburao, Occidental Mindoro
- DZRT in Puerto Princesa City
- DWKV in Lipa City
- DWLC in Lemery, Batangas
- DZGN in Sorsogon City
- DYBC in Bacolod City
- DYRD-FM in Tagbilaran City
- DYCT-FM in Tacloban City
- DXIX-FM in Iligan City
- DXCG in Tagum City
- DXCJ in General Santos City
- DXNS-FM in Butuan City
- DXDS in Tandag City

== Sierra Leone ==
- Capital Radio in Bo

== Spain ==
- XORadio in Murcia

== Taiwan ==
- Transfer CNR Cross-Strait Radio in Matsu

== United Kingdom ==
- Clyde 1 in Rothesay
- Downtown Radio in Ballymena
- Greatest Hits Radio Scottish Borders & North Northumberland in Berwick-upon-Tweed
- Greatest Hits Radio Sussex in Littlehampton
- Heart North West in Windermere
- Heart South in Bournemouth, Poole, Christchurch and Weymouth
- Nevis Radio in Skye and Mallaig

== United States (Channel 272) ==
- KANB-LP in Kalispell, Montana
- KBCE in Boyce, Louisiana
- KBLO in Corcoran, California
- KBXR in Columbia, Missouri
- KCCP-LP in South Padre Island, Texas
- KCJC in Dardanelle, Arkansas
- KCRX-FM in Seaside, Oregon
- KCZQ in Cresco, Iowa
- KDEX-FM in Dexter, Missouri
- KDOE in Antlers, Oklahoma
- KDUT in Randolph, Utah
- KEDU-LP in Ruidoso, New Mexico
- KEHK in Brownsville, Oregon
- KGDA-LP in Fort Smith, Arkansas
- KHNS in Haines, Alaska
- KHWA in Weed, California
- KICR in Coeur D'alene, Idaho
- KJJJ in Laughlin, Nevada
- KJLH in Compton, California
- KJSN in Modesto, California
- KKPN in Rockport, Texas
- KKQQ in Volga, South Dakota
- KKYC in Clovis, New Mexico
- KLFZ in Jacksonville, Texas
- KOWY in Dayton, Wyoming
- KOZQ-FM in Waynesville, Missouri
- KPEZ in Austin, Texas
- KPNY in Alliance, Nebraska
- KQEW in Fordyce, Arkansas
- KQNU in Onawa, Iowa
- KRCQ in Detroit Lakes, Minnesota
- KRHQ in Indio, California
- KRMG-FM in Sand Springs, Oklahoma
- KRNY in Kearney, Nebraska
- KSAQ in Charlotte, Texas
- KSJH-LP in Hart, Texas
- KSPK-FM in Walsenburg, Colorado
- KSSQ-LP in Siloam Springs, Arkansas
- KTRQ in Colt, Arkansas
- KUTQ in La Verkin, Utah
- KUVA in Uvalde, Texas
- KVLE in Gunnison, Colorado
- KVOQ in Greenwood Village, Colorado
- KVUW in Wendover, Nevada
- KWDQ in Woodward, Oklahoma
- KWFS in Wichita Falls, Texas
- KWRL in La Grande, Oregon
- KWRQ in Clifton, Arizona
- KWXM in Simsboro, Louisiana
- KXGE in Dubuque, Iowa
- KXYL-FM in Coleman, Texas
- KYOE in Point Arena, California
- KYYT in Goldendale, Washington
- KZRN in Hettinger, North Dakota
- KZXY in Apple Valley, California
- WAKC in Concord, New Hampshire
- WAMI in Opp, Alabama
- WAUH in Wautoma, Wisconsin
- WBAB in Babylon, New York
- WBGN (FM) in Munfordville, Kentucky
- WBQE-LP in Brooklyn, New York
- WBSC-LP in Bamberg, South Carolina
- WBTO-FM in Petersburg, Indiana
- WBTQ in Weston, West Virginia
- WCAT in Carlisle, Pennsylvania
- WCBK-FM in Martinsville, Indiana
- WCXX in Madawaska, Maine
- WDNP-LP in Dover, Ohio
- WDXC in Pound, Virginia
- WEBQ-FM in Eldorado, Illinois
- WEKL in Augusta, Georgia
- WELR in Roanoke, Alabama
- WEXI-LP in Hallandale, Florida
- WFOX in Saint Andrews, South Carolina
- WFVL in Lumberton, North Carolina
- WFXN in Galion, Ohio
- WGBJ in Auburn, Indiana
- WGCM-FM in Gulfport, Mississippi
- WGGG-LP in Ossipee, New Hampshire
- WGOW in Soddy-Daisy, Tennessee
- WGRT in Port Huron, Michigan
- WGSP in Pageland, South Carolina
- WGTX-FM in Truro, Massachusetts
- WGYS-LP in Dixfield, Maine
- WHIV-LP in New Orleans, Louisiana
- WHKB in Houghton, Michigan
- WHTL in Whitehall, Wisconsin
- WHUK in Crozet, Virginia
- WKBR-LP in Town of Highlands, New York
- WKJO in Smithfield, North Carolina
- WKJT in Teutopolis, Illinois
- WKKF in Ballston Spa, New York
- WKLN in Wilmington, Ohio
- WKZF in Morton, Illinois
- WKZR in Milledgeville, Georgia
- WLHM in Logansport, Indiana
- WLKQ in Buford, Georgia
- WLLK in Somerset, Kentucky
- WLMZ-FM in Pittston, Pennsylvania
- WMBX in Jensen Beach, Florida
- WMIO in Cabo Rojo, Puerto Rico
- WMMJ in Bethesda, Maryland
- WMOS in Stonington, Connecticut
- WMQV-LP in Kissimmee, Florida
- WMTD in Hinton, West Virginia
- WNJD in Cape May, New Jersey
- WPOS in Holland, Ohio
- WPTM in Roanoke Rapids, North Carolina
- WQHZ in Erie, Pennsylvania
- WQTC-FM in Manitowoc, Wisconsin
- WQTU in Rome, Georgia
- WRMJ in Aledo, Illinois
- WSIZ-FM in Jacksonville, Georgia
- WSKK in Ripley, Mississippi
- WSUS in Franklin, New Jersey
- WTHN in Sault Sainte Marie, Michigan
- WTPJ-LP in York, South Carolina
- WUBU in New Carlisle, Indiana
- WVOR in Canandaigua, New York
- WVRQ in Viroqua, Wisconsin
- WWLD in Cairo, Georgia
- WWMP in Grand Isle, Vermont
- WWMY in Beech Mountain, North Carolina
- WWQB in Westwood, Kentucky
- WWSL in Philadelphia, Mississippi
- WXLC in Waukegan, Illinois
- WXMA in Louisville, Kentucky
- WXUS in Dunnellon, Florida
- WXXS in Lancaster, New Hampshire
- WYBR in Big Rapids, Michigan
- WYCA in Crete, Illinois
- WYOT in Rochelle, Illinois
- WZDQ in Humboldt, Tennessee
