= WBTO =

WBTO may refer to:

- WBTO (AM), a defunct radio station (1600 AM) licensed to Linton, Indiana, United States
- WBTO-FM, a radio station (102.3 FM) licensed to Petersburg, Indiana, United States
