= Pioneer Regional School Corporation =

School district in Indiana

Pioneer Regional School Corporation is a school corporation located in Royal Center in Indiana, United States.

The district extends into White County.

== General information ==
The Pioneer Regional School Corporation consists of five townships, four of which are in Cass County (Boone, Harrison, Jefferson, and Noble), and one which is in White County-Cass township. The corporation covers 153 square miles (400 km^{2}) and includes the communities of Lucerne, Headlee, Lake Cicott, and Royal Center.

The two schools encompassed in the Regional School Corporation are Pioneer Elementary School, serving grades K–6, and Pioneer Junior – Senior High School, serving grades 7–12. The school mascot is a black panther, and the school anthem is "Mighty Panthers".

== School history ==
The organization of the Pioneer Regional School Corporation was brought about by the Reorganization Act of Indiana of 1959. This act required that all schools within the state of Indiana be organized into single-unit school corporations of at least one thousand students in attendance.

The only existing and occupied building eliminated during the reorganization process was the school at Lucerne, which was closed in 1966 when the junior-senior high school building was completed and occupied. The corporation also has one elementary building, which, along with the junior-senior high school, is located in Royal Center.

Pioneer School Corporation was originally known as Royal Center High School, and its mascot was a bulldog.

The organizational meeting for the board of trustees was called by Chalmer Condon, then superintendent of Cass County Schools, on January 2, 1963. The members of the first board of trustees of the Pioneer Regional School Corporation were Paul Harrison, president; H.W. Roller, vice president; Roger Ide, secretary; Harold Wilson, treasurer; and Donald Heiny, assistant secretary. The corporation's first superintendent was Ralph L. Kelly, who served until January 20, 1968.
