= WVRQ =

WVRQ may refer to:

- WVRQ-FM, a radio station (102.3 FM) licensed to Viroqua, Wisconsin, United States
- WVRQ (AM), a radio station (1360 AM) licensed to Viroqua, Wisconsin, United States
