= Tradio =

Radio advertisement program

Tradio is a type of phone-in radio program formatted to provide a venue for listeners to freely advertise items they have to sell or trade. The concept is analogous to classified ads in local newspapers and most prevalent in the south and midwest. "Tradio" is a portmanteau of "trade" and "radio". The format is also often called Swap Shop; Buy, Sell, or Trade; Biz Baz; or Trading Post.

== Format ==
In most tradio programs, listeners can call in to the show and advertise, for free, items they are selling, or request items to purchase from other listeners The caller then provides a phone number so that other listeners can contact the person for further information. Since the increased prevalence of e-mail and other electronic media, most stations permit the sending in of items to sell via e-mail or fax, though due to regular and/or identity theft concerns some stations will assign a code number to anonymize the transaction and keep identifying information off the air. Most stations also permit listeners to send lists of items through postal mail. Tradio programs are particularly associated with the full service format; tradio was commonly found on Independent Local Radio in the UK when it used a similar format (up to around 1990).

There are usually some limits to what can be bought and sold through tradio programs. Most stations stipulate that only individuals, and no businesses, may use the tradio service, since the financial security of these small stations usually relies on the advertising dollars from these businesses. Federal regulations prohibit the sale of firearms through these services; real estate is also usually not allowed on tradio programs. Restrictions on the sale of automobiles varies from station to station.

The name "tradio" does not apply to any one particular program or franchise; there are no national, international or syndicated tradio programs or intellectual properties.

== Popularity ==
Typically tradio and similar programs are only heard on small, rural stations; KDKA in Pittsburgh, Pennsylvania is the largest market with a tradio program, airing weekly on Saturday afternoons. A similarly styled program titled Wheelin' and Dealin' with Dave Ramos also airs during the weekends on WTAM in Cleveland, Ohio (but is not in a regular timeslot). In smaller markets, tradio programs can air daily.

Various Tradio programs have been the target of prank phone calling by The Howard Stern Show's Richard Christy and Sal Governale.

== List of stations with tradio programs ==
- KCTN/100.1: Garnavillo, Iowa
- KECO/96.5: Elk City, Oklahoma
- KEDU-LP/102.3: Ruidoso, New Mexico
- KDKA/1020: Pittsburgh, Pennsylvania
- KOFO/1220: Ottawa, Kansas
- KSRM/920: Soldotna, Alaska
- KTRF/1230: Thief River Falls, Minnesota
- WCJW/1140: Warsaw, New York
- WGAA/1340: Cedartown, Georgia
- WKNG/1060: Tallapoosa, Georgia
- WLVL/1370: Lockport, New York
- WSKV-FM/104.9: Stanton, Kentucky
- WTAB/1370: Tabor City, North Carolina
- WTAM/1100: Cleveland, Ohio
- WYXI/1390: Athens, Tennessee
- WCHE/95.3: West Chester, Pennsylvania
- WRIL/106.3: Pineville, Kentucky
