= Jefferson Township, Cass County, Indiana =

Jefferson Township
- Township
- Location of Jefferson Township in Cass County
- Coordinates: 40°46′44″N 86°31′30″W
- Country: United States
- State: Indiana
- County: Cass

Government
  - Type: Indiana township

Area
  - Total: 36.10 sq mi (93.51 km^{2})
  - Land: 35.76 sq mi (92.62 km^{2})
  - Water: 0.34 sq mi (0.89 km^{2})
- Elevation: 709 ft (216 m)

Population (2020)
  - Total: 1,297
  - Density: 36.27/sq mi (14.00/km^{2})
- FIPS code: 18-37890
- GNIS feature ID: 453481

Jefferson Township is one of fourteen townships in Cass County, Indiana. As of the 2020 census, its population was 1,297 (down from 1,452 at 2010) and contained 580 housing units.

== History ==
Jefferson Township was organized in 1831. It was named for Thomas Jefferson, third President of the United States.

== Geography ==
Jefferson Township covers an area of 36.1 square miles (93 km^{2}); 0.35 square miles (0.91 km^{2}) (0.97 percent) of this is water. Lake Cicott is in this township.

=== Unincorporated towns ===
- Lake Cicott

=== Adjacent townships ===
- Boone (north)
- Harrison (northeast)
- Noble (east)
- Clinton (southeast)
- Liberty Township, Carroll County (south)
- Adams Township, Carroll County (southwest)
- Jackson Township, White County (west)
- Cass Township, White County (northwest)

=== Major highways ===
- U.S. Route 24

=== Cemeteries ===
The township contains two cemeteries: Davis and Zion. Davis Cemetery is located a mile east of Burnettsville and a half mile east of the White County-Cass county line, and is commonly referred to as the Davis Cemetery Burnettsville in obituaries. It was also known as the Winegardner Cemetery.
