= Cass Township, White County, Indiana =

Cass Township
- Township
- Location in White County
- Coordinates: 40°52′11″N 86°38′20″W
- Country: United States
- State: Indiana
- County: White

Government
  - Type: Indiana township

Area
  - Total: 36.19 sq mi (93.7 km^{2})
  - Land: 36.19 sq mi (93.7 km^{2})
  - Water: 0 sq mi (0 km^{2}) 0%
- Elevation: 696 ft (212 m)

Population (2020)
  - Total: 583
  - Density: 16.1/sq mi (6.22/km^{2})
- ZIP codes: 46978, 46985, 47926, 47950, 47960
- GNIS feature ID: 453169

Cass Township is one of twelve townships in White County, Indiana, United States. As of the 2020 census, its population was 583 and it contained 211 housing units.

Cass Township was established in 1848. The township was named for Gen. Lewis Cass, Governor of Michigan Territory.

Historical population
Census	Pop.	Note	%±
1890	893		—
1900	1,215		36.1%
1910	946		−22.1%
1920	871		−7.9%
1930	596		−31.6%
1940	772		29.5%
1950	651		−15.7%
1960	632		−2.9%
1970	614		−2.8%
1980	570		−7.2%
1990	569		−0.2%
2000	590		3.7%
2010	585		−0.8%
2020	583		−0.3%
Source: US Decennial Census

== Geography ==
According to the 2010 census, the township has a total area of 36.19 square miles (93.7 km^{2}), all land.

=== Unincorporated towns ===
- Headlee at 40.897818°N 86.658621°W

(This list is based on USGS data and may include former settlements.)

=== Adjacent townships ===
- Indian Creek Township, Pulaski County (north)
- Van Buren Township, Pulaski County (northeast)
- Boone Township, Cass County (east)
- Jefferson Township, Cass County (southeast)
- Jackson Township (south)
- Lincoln Township (south)
- Liberty Township (west)

=== Cemeteries ===
The township contains Bell Center Cemetery.

== School districts ==
- Pioneer Regional School Corporation
- Twin Lakes School Corporation

== Political districts ==
- Indiana's 2nd congressional district
- State House District 16
- State Senate District 07
