= WHZR =

Coordinates: 40°48′43″N 86°21′56″W

- Royal Center, Indiana; United States
- Broadcast area: Logansport, Indiana; Peru, Indiana
- Frequency: 103.7 MHz
- Branding: Hoosier Country 103.7

Programming
- Format: Country music

Ownership
- Owner: James Allan Schliemann; (Iron Horse Broadcasting, LLC)
- Sister stations: WSAL, WLHM

Technical information
- Licensing authority: FCC
- Facility ID: 7820
- Class: A
- ERP: 6,000 watts
- HAAT: 100 meters (330 ft)

Links
- Public license information: Public file; LMS
- Website: indianasbestradio.com

WHZR 103.7 FM is a radio station broadcasting a country music format. Licensed to Royal Center, Indiana, the station serves the areas of Logansport, Indiana and Peru, Indiana, and is owned by James Allan Schliemann, through licensee Iron Horse Broadcasting, LLC. Hoosier Country's most popular shows include Lunch With Lowe, weekdays from 11 a.m.- 1 p.m...an all request country music show featuring songs 25 years of age and newer. The Roots of Hoosier Country hosted by Dale Lowe is an all request show from 6-11 a.m. on Saturday mornings, it features songs of the classical era of country music.
