= Harrison Township, Cass County, Indiana =

Harrison Township
- Township
- Location of Harrison Township in Cass County
- Coordinates: 40°51′58″N 86°24′18″W
- Country: United States
- State: Indiana
- County: Cass

Government
  - Type: Indiana township

Area
  - Total: 35.49 sq mi (91.93 km^{2})
  - Land: 35.49 sq mi (91.93 km^{2})
  - Water: 0 sq mi (0 km^{2})
- Elevation: 797 ft (243 m)

Population (2020)
  - Total: 747
  - Density: 21.0/sq mi (8.13/km^{2})
- FIPS code: 18-31666
- GNIS feature ID: 453380

Harrison Township is one of fourteen townships in Cass County, Indiana. As of the 2020 census, its population was 747 (down from 802 at 2010) and it contained 323 housing units.

== History ==
Harrison Township was organized in 1836. It was named for William Henry Harrison, who had served as Governor of the Indiana Territory, congressman, senator, and who would afterward serve as the ninth President of the United States.

== Geography ==
Harrison Township covers an area of 35.49 square miles (91.9 km^{2}), all land.

=== Unincorporated towns ===
- Leases Corner
- Lucerne

=== Adjacent townships ===
- Wayne Township, Fulton County (north)
- Bethlehem (east)
- Clay (southeast)
- Noble (south)
- Jefferson (southwest)
- Boone (west)
- Van Buren Township, Pulaski County (northwest)

=== Major highways ===
- U.S. Route 35
- Indiana State Road 16
- Indiana State Road 17

=== Cemeteries ===
The township contains four cemeteries: Crooked Creek, Grant, Old Indian Creek and Saint Elizabeth.
