= David Morales (disambiguation) =

David Morales (born 1961) is an American DJ and record producer.

David Morales may also refer to:

- Dave Morales, radio personality, DJ and independent producer
- David Morales (rower) (born 1977), Spanish rower
- David Sánchez Morales (1925–1978), Central Intelligence Agency operative
- David S. Morales (born 1968), American lawyer
- David Morales (politician) (born 1998), American politician
- David Morales (racing driver) (born 2003), American-Dominican-Argentine racing driver
