= WQTY =

Coordinates: 39.013°N 87.373°W

- Linton, Indiana; United States
- Broadcast area: Vincennes/Wabash Valley
- Frequency: 93.3 MHz
- Branding: Sunrise 93.3

Programming
- Format: Christian contemporary

Ownership
- Owner: The Original Company, Inc.

History
- First air date: September 14, 1970
- Former call signs: WBTO-FM (1970–1980)

Technical information
- Licensing authority: FCC
- Facility ID: 37737
- Class: B1
- ERP: 12,000 watts
- HAAT: 145 meters (476 ft)

Links
- Public license information: Public file; LMS
- Webcast: Listen live
- Website: wqtyradio.com

WQTY (93.3 FM) is a radio station licensed to Linton, Indiana, serving Vincennes, Indiana, Robinson, Illinois and the Terre Haute area. WQTY airs a Christian contemporary format and is owned by The Original Company, Inc.

== History ==
=== WBTO-FM ===
The station began broadcasting September 14, 1970, and held the call sign WBTO-FM. It was owned by Linton Broadcasting Company and aired an easy listening format. The station originally broadcast at 93.5 MHz.

=== WQTY ===
In 1980, the station's call sign was changed to WQTY. Initially airing a middle of the road (MOR) format, by 1983 the station was airing a contemporary hits format, and by 1985 it had adopted a country music format. By the early 1990s, the station had begun airing an adult standards format. It switched to an adult contemporary format in 1996, but in 1997 returned to an adult standards format, affiliated with Music of Your Life.

In 1999, the station was sold to The Original Company, along with AM 1600 WBTO, for $350,000. In 2003, the station began airing a country format, simulcasting 106.9 WWBL. The station adopted an oldies format in 2006. In January 2020, the station's format was changed from classic hits to Christian contemporary music.
