= DYCT =

DYCT may refer to:

- DYCT-FM, a defunct FM radio station in Tacloban
- DYCT-DTV, a television station in Cebu City, branded as BEAM TV
