= Mr. Football (Indiana) =

Annual high school football award

The Indiana Mr. Football award is an award given to the top high school American football player in the state of Indiana, presented annually by The Indianapolis Star.

== Winners ==
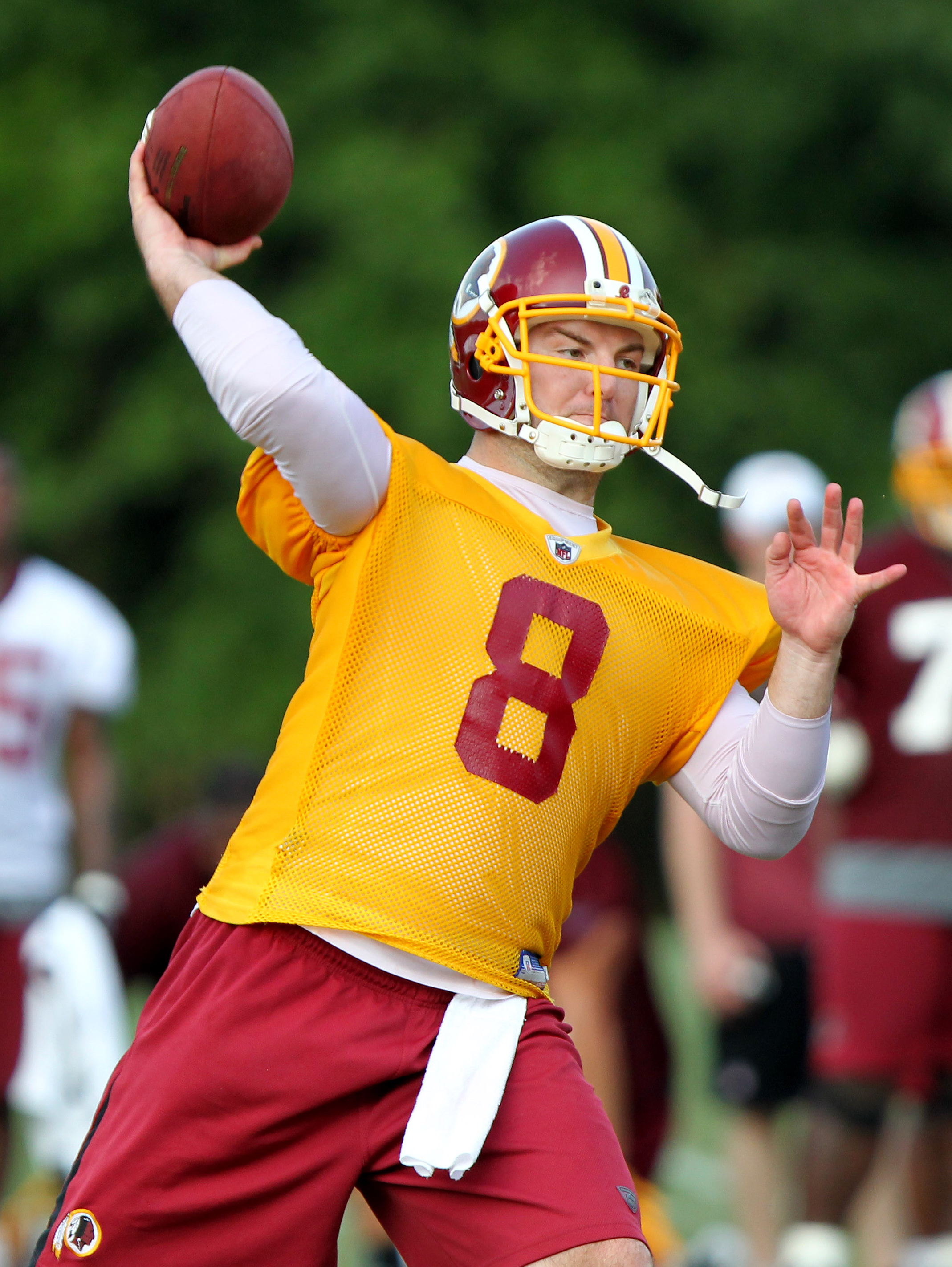
Rex Grossman was 1998's Mr. Football from Bloomington South.

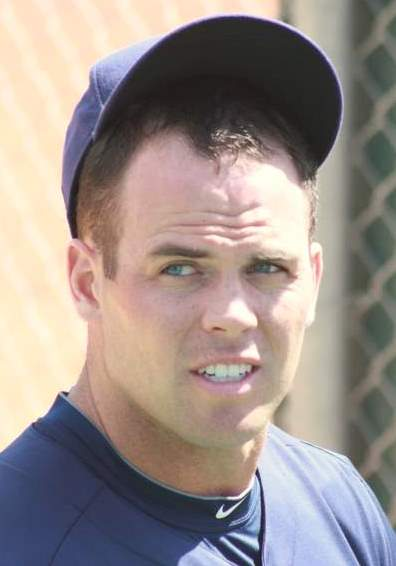
Clayton Richard was 2002's Mr. Football from McCutcheon.

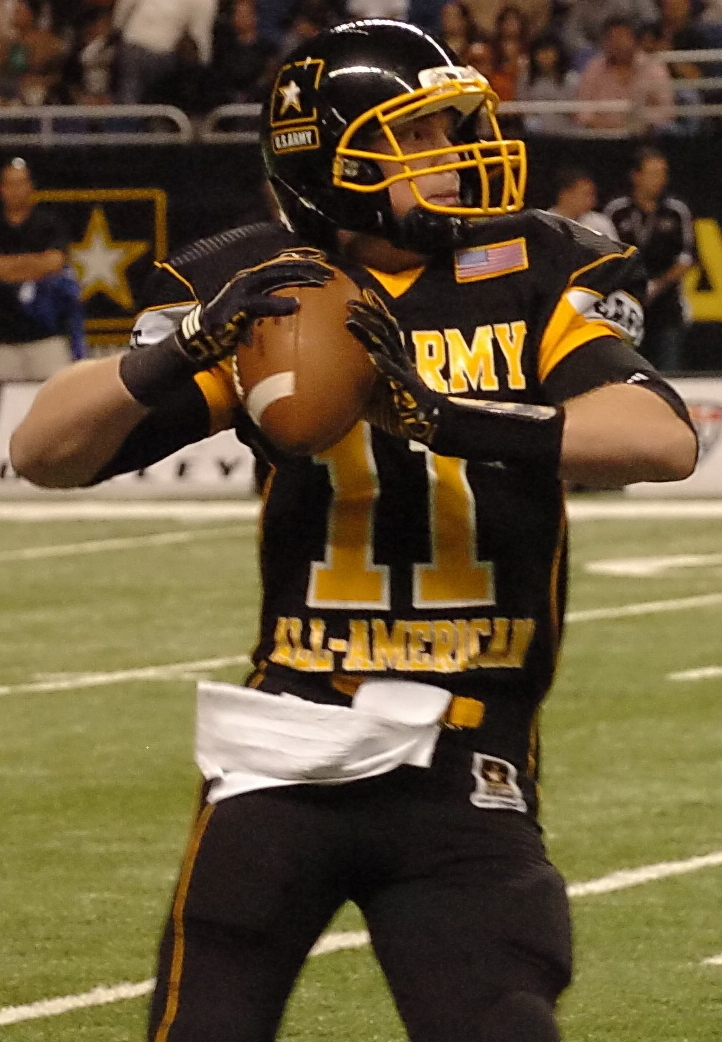
Gunner Kiel was 2011's Mr. Football from Columbus East.

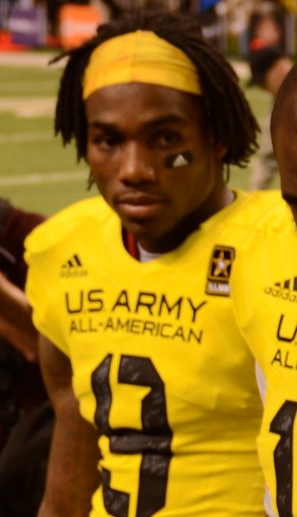
Jaylon Smith was 2012's Mr. Football from Bishop Luers.

Professional teams listed are teams known.

| Year | Player | High school | College | NFL draft |
|---|---|---|---|---|
| 1992 | Alex Smith, RB | Franklin County | Indiana | |
| 1993 | Bo Barzilauskas, OL/DL | Bloomington South | Indiana | |
| 1994 | Josh Martini, RB | East Central | | |
| 1995 | Earl Haniford, QB | Martinsville | Indiana | |
| 1996 | Israel Thompson, RB | Martinsville | Ball State | |
| 1997 | DuJuan Daniels, RB | Indianapolis Bishop Chatard | Boston College | |
| 1998 | Rex Grossman, QB | Bloomington South | Florida | 2003 NFL draft: 1st round, 22nd overall by the Chicago Bears |
| 1999 | Derrick Ellis, RB | Indianapolis Arlington | | |
| 2000 | Otis Shannon, RB | Indianapolis Cathedral | Harper College | |
| 2001 | James Banks, QB/DB | Ben Davis | Tennessee; Carson–Newman | |
| 2002 | Clayton Richard, QB | Lafayette McCutcheon | Michigan | |
| 2003 | Desmond Tardy, QB | Warren Central | Purdue | |
| 2004 | Jason Werner, WR/S | Indianapolis Roncalli | Purdue | |
| 2005 | Dexter Taylor, QB | Warren Central | Tulsa; Western Kentucky; Marian | |
| 2006 | Darren Evans, RB | Warren Central | Virginia Tech | Indianapolis Colts, Tennessee Titans |
| 2007 | Paul McIntosh, QB | Evansville Reitz Memorial | Army; Southern Illinois | |
| 2008 | Morgan Newton, QB | Carmel | Kentucky | |
| 2009 | Dan Wodicka, QB | West Lafayette | Johns Hopkins University | |
| 2010 | Tre Roberson, QB | Lawrence Central | Indiana; Illinois State | |
| 2011 | Gunner Kiel, QB | Columbus East | Notre Dame; Cincinnati | |
| 2012 | Jaylon Smith, RB/LB | Fort Wayne Bishop Luers | Notre Dame | 2016 NFL draft: 2nd round, 34th overall by the Dallas Cowboys |
| 2013 | Terry McLaurin, WR | Indianapolis Cathedral | Ohio State | 2019 NFL draft: 3rd round, 76th overall by the Washington Redskins |
| 2014 | Markell Jones, RB | Columbus East | Purdue | |
| 2015 | Brandon Peters, QB | Avon | Michigan; Illinois | |
| 2016 | Hunter Johnson, QB | Brownsburg | Clemson; Northwestern | |
| 2017 | Reese Taylor, QB | Ben Davis | Indiana | |
| 2018 | Jack Kiser, QB | Pioneer | Notre Dame | 2025 NFL draft: 4th round, 107th overall by the Jacksonville Jaguars |
| 2019 | Charlie Spegal, RB | New Palestine | Indiana; Ball State; Butler | |
| 2020 | Carson Steele, RB | Center Grove | Ball State | 2024 NFL draft: UDFA by the Kansas City Chiefs |
| 2021 | Brady Allen, QB | Gibson Southern | Purdue; Louisville | |
| 2022 | Drayk Bowen, RB/LB | Andrean | Notre Dame | |
| 2023 | Josh Ringer, RB | East Central | Miami (OH) | |
| 2024 | Mark Zackery IV, WR/DB | Ben Davis | Notre Dame | |
| 2025 | Myles McLaughlin, QB | Knox | Murray State | |

=== Schools with multiple winners ===
| School | Number of Awards | Years |
|---|---|---|
| Ben Davis | 3 | 2001, 2017, 2024 |
| Warren Central | 3 | 2003, 2005, 2006 |
| Columbus East | 2 | 2011, 2014 |
| Indianapolis Cathedral | 2 | 2000, 2013 |
| Bloomington South | 2 | 1993, 1998 |
| Martinsville | 2 | 1995, 1996 |
| East Central High School | 2 | 1994, 2023 |
