= KRSR =

KRSR may refer to:

- KRSR (FM), a defunct radio station (90.5 FM) formerly licensed to serve Ridgecrest, California, United States
- KAJE, a radio station (107.3 FM) licensed to serve Ingleside, Texas, United States, which held the call sign KRSR from 2009 to 2010
