= KZFM =

Coordinates: 27.659°N 97.570°W

- Corpus Christi, Texas; United States
- Broadcast area: Corpus Christi metropolitan area
- Frequency: 95.5 MHz
- Branding: Hot Z95

Programming
- Format: Rhythmic contemporary
- Affiliations: Premiere Networks

Ownership
- Owner: Malkan Interactive Communications, LLC

History
- First air date: June 12, 1954
- Former call signs: KCCT-FM (1954–1957); KDMC (1957–1960); KMFM (1960–1964)

Technical information
- Licensing authority: FCC
- Facility ID: 39716
- Class: C
- ERP: 100,000 watts
- HAAT: 273 meters (896 ft)

Links
- Public license information: Public file; LMS
- Webcast: Listen Live
- Website: http://www.hotz95.com

KZFM (Hot Z95) is a Corpus Christi, Texas, United States–based radio station with a rhythmic contemporary musical format. It is owned by Malkan Interactive Communications, LLC, and broadcasts on a frequency of 95.5 MHz with an effective radiated power of 100,000 watts. KZFM was once home to radio personality Glenn Beck. The station's studios and offices are located on Leopard Street just west of downtown Corpus Christi, and its transmitter tower is located south of the city in unincorporated Nueces County.

== History ==
The Coastal Bend got its first FM radio station on June 12, 1954, when KCCT-FM began broadcasting. Prior to its establishment, the nearest FM station was at San Antonio. Originally broadcasting from studios on Staples Street and an antenna on the KVDO-TV tower, the station broadcast classical and semi-classical music, but it was on the air less than a month, reverting to simulcasting the Spanish-language programming of its AM counterpart, KCCT (1150 AM).

KCCT sold the FM outlet in 1957 to Master Music, Inc., which programmed a "good music" format and added a subcarrier channel to broadcast background music (Muzak) to stores and offices. The call letters were changed to KDMC on June 24 and again to KMFM in 1960, in the same year that the station increased its effective radiated power to 10,000 watts.

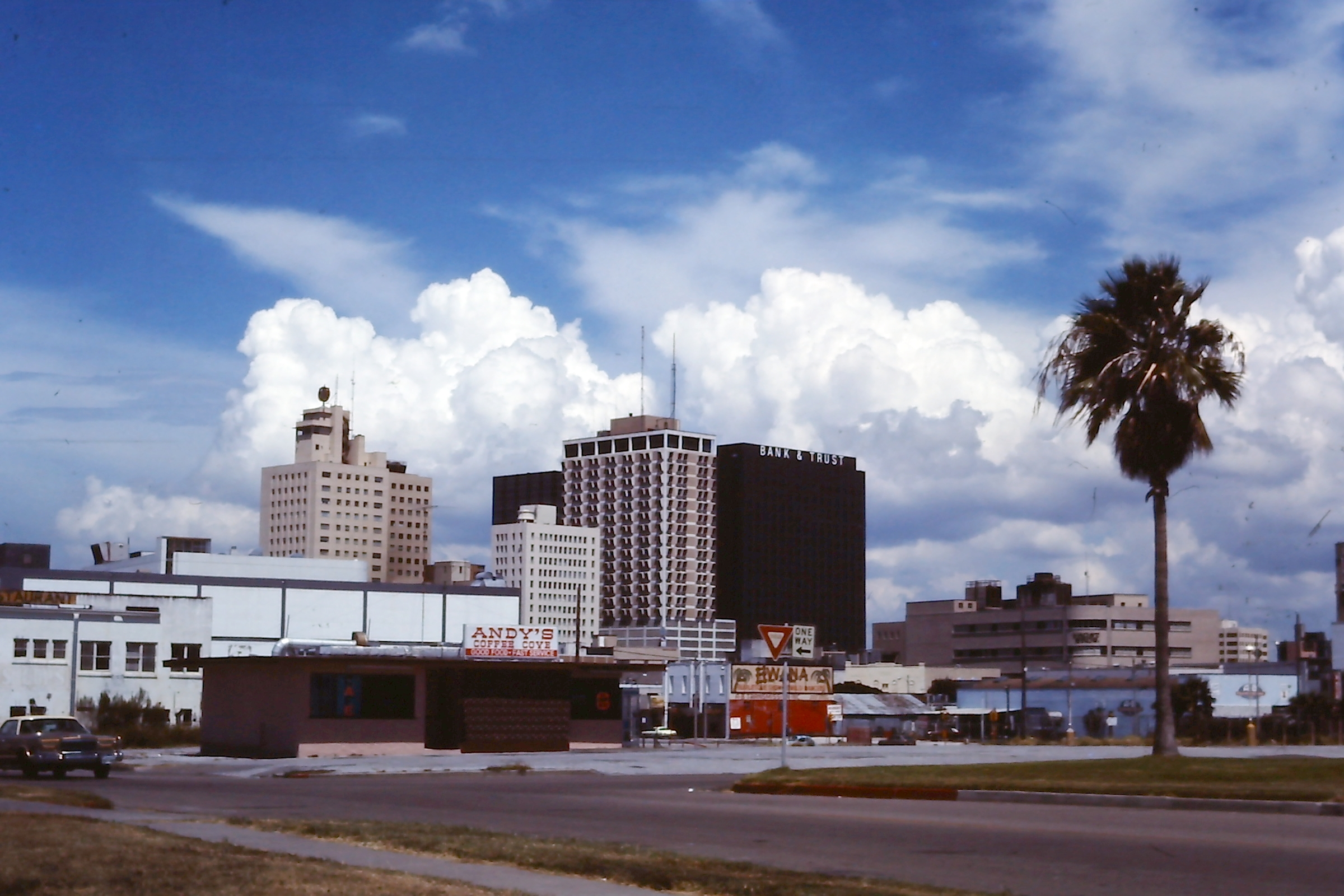
The 600 Building with former KZFM tower (center) is visible in this undated photo

On May 14, 1964, the station became known as KZFM. Later that year, financial problems prompted Master to take the station silent and put it up for sale. Gulf Business Music, Inc., a consortium primarily owned by the Balthrope family, bought KZFM for $104,250. The Balthropes returned KZFM to the air on December 8 from a new tower atop the 600 Building. Effective radiated power was raised twice in two years, first to 17,500 and then to 41,000 watts.

Texas broadcaster Dudley Waller bought KZFM in 1969 for $50,000. The next year, the station flipped to Album Rock. During which time Don Durden was the General Manager and Gil Garcia was the Program Director. The station featured many announcers later to move on and become inductees into the Texas Radio Hall of Fame such as Johnny Marks & Gil Garcia. KZFM at the time started promoting concerts featuring new Rock bands, one unknown band was from Houston Texas called Z Z Top who played as a start up band for Cheech and Chong other National groups soon followed. Waller would sell KZFM in 1973 to Texas Media Group. Syndicated talk show host Glenn Beck was the program director/morning show host from 1983 to 1985; he was then hired away by WRKA in Louisville, Kentucky.

KZFM would evolve into a rhythmic direction in the late 1990s. KZFM was voted Radio & Records "Radio Station of the Year" for 5 years in a row during the mid-2000s.

In 2010, while under new management, then-Malkan Broadcasting decided that in an effort to better the company as a whole, would demonstrate a series of changes to its programming operations. This decision resulted in multiple changes to the on-air line ups, including multiple terminations from KZFM, and both of its sister stations, KKBA-FM, and KEYS-AM (which was the hardest hit by the changes due to its lack of authoritative ratings). The changes also brought in multiple, new on-air talents to the radio station. A full talent line up for KZFM can be found at http://www.hotz95.com.

=== Discrimination lawsuit ===
On November 12, 2014, as a result of trial by jury, Malkan Interactive Communications was found guilty of discrimination against a number of former employees. Under the verdict, Malkan Interactive Communications, LLC allowed former, non-Hispanic, employees to operate against their agreed non-compete clause while maintaining strict control over other former employees, of whom are Hispanic. The non-compete clause is signed by all employees upon being accepted by management after an initial interview has been completed. The clause is maintained during, and for six months post-employment. It mandates that the employee, current or former, refrain from obtaining employment with other commercial radio and television broadcast entities within the same operating arena, or the same radio and television broadcast market regulated by the Federal Communications Commission.
