= George E. Dunn =

American politician

Member of the South Dakota House of Representatives
- In office 1985–1986

Personal details
- Born: September 27, 1927 Royal Center, Indiana, U.S.
- Died: May 10, 2020 (aged 92)
- Party: Republican

George E. Dunn (September 27, 1927 – May 10, 2020) was an American politician. He served as a Republican member of the South Dakota House of Representatives.

== Life and career ==
Dunn was born in Royal Center, Indiana. He attended Sheldon High School and served in the United States Army, and was also a highway patrolman.

Dunn served in the South Dakota House of Representatives from 1985 to 1986. He died on May 10, 2020, at the age of 92.
