= KNTR =

- Lake Havasu City, Arizona; United States
- Frequency: 980 kHz
- Branding: Sports 980

Programming
- Format: Sports radio
- Affiliations: Infinity Sports Network

Ownership
- Owner: Steven M. Greeley
- Sister stations: KJJJ

History
- First air date: 1970 (as KFWJ)
- Former call signs: KFWJ (1970–1997); KBBC (1997–1999)
- Call sign meaning: K News; Talk; Radio (referencing its previous news/talk format)

Technical information
- Licensing authority: FCC
- Facility ID: 38310
- Class: D
- Power: 1,000 watts day 49 watts night
- Transmitter coordinates: 34°30′12″N 114°21′28″W
- Translators: 94.3 K232EI (Lake Havasu City); 96.9 K245BL (Desert Center, California)
- Repeater: 102.3 KJJJ-HD4 (Laughlin, Nevada)

Links
- Public license information: Public file; LMS
- Webcast: Listen Live
- Website: kntrsports.com

KNTR (980 AM, "Sports 980") is a radio station licensed to serve Lake Havasu City, Arizona, United States. The station is owned by Steven M. Greeley. It airs a sports radio format.

The station was assigned the KNTR call letters by the Federal Communications Commission on November 30, 1999.

== Previous logo ==
(KNTR's logo under previous news/talk format)
