= WSAL =

Coordinates: 40°45′16″N 86°18′40″W

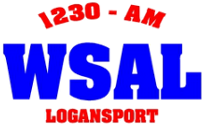
- Logansport, Indiana; United States
- Frequency: 1230 kHz

Programming
- Format: News-Talk / Sports / Adult Standards

Ownership
- Owner: James Allan Schliemann; (Iron Horse Broadcasting, LLC)
- Sister stations: WLHM, WHZR

History
- First air date: 1949

Technical information
- Licensing authority: FCC
- Facility ID: 38277
- Class: C
- Power: AM 1,000 watts FM 200 watts
- Translator: W235CU (94.9 FM) Logansport

Links
- Public license information: Public file; LMS
- Website: WSAL's webpage

WSAL 1230 AM/ 94.9 FM is a radio station broadcasting a format consisting News-Talk and Sports as well as Adult standards music. The station is licensed to Logansport, Indiana, and is owned by James Allan Schliemann, through licensee Iron Horse Broadcasting, LLC. Music programming comes from Westwood One's America's Best Music format. WSAL's most popular program is Talk of the Town, featuring community happenings each morning from 9-10 a.m.
