= Lincoln Township, White County, Indiana =

Lincoln Township
- Township
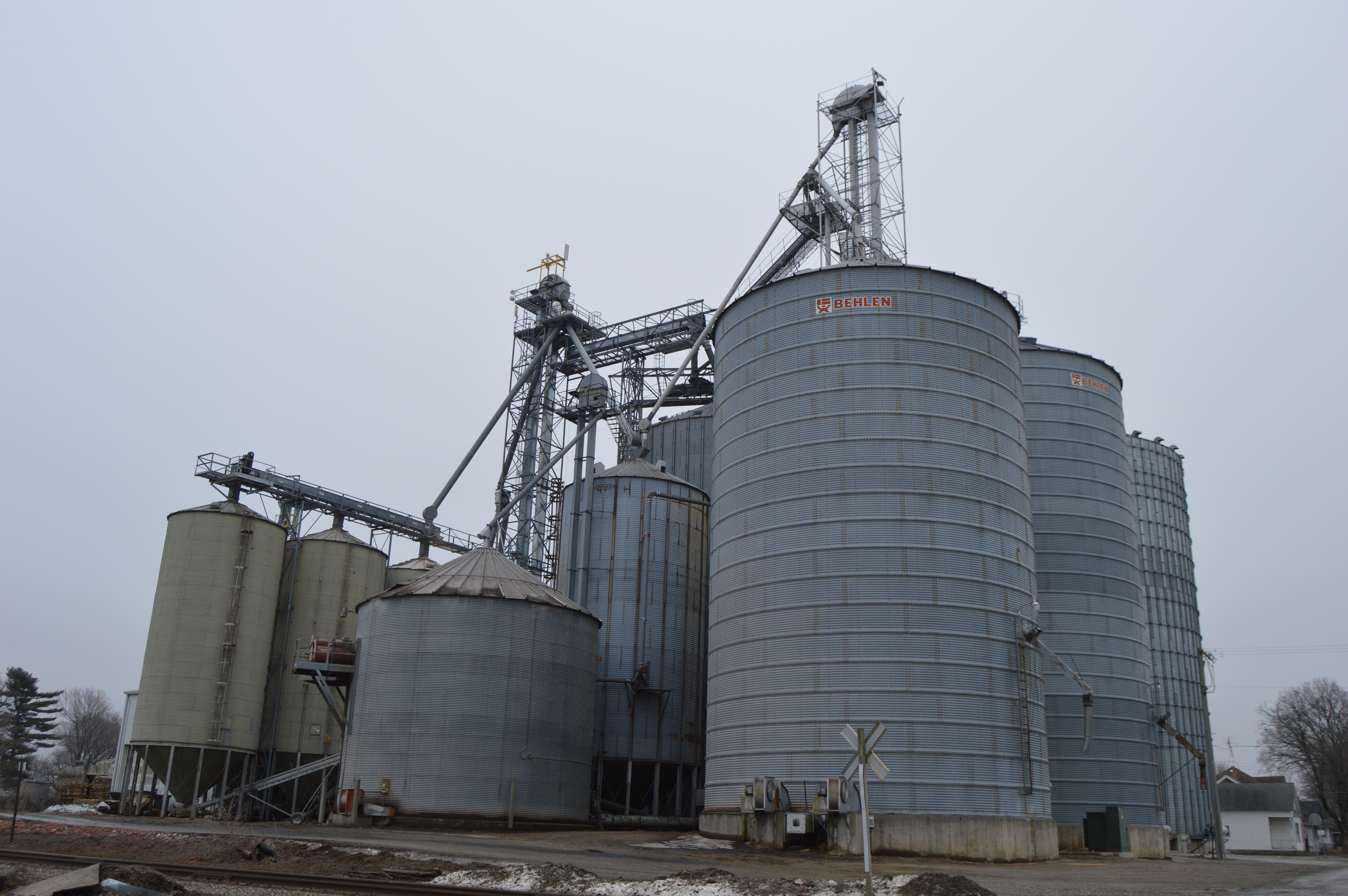
- Idaville grain elevator

- Location in White County
- Coordinates: 40°47′04″N 86°39′47″W
- Country: United States
- State: Indiana
- County: White

Government
  - Type: Indiana township

Area
  - Total: 21.51 sq mi (55.7 km^{2})
  - Land: 21.51 sq mi (55.7 km^{2})
  - Water: 0 sq mi (0 km^{2}) 0%
- Elevation: 686 ft (209 m)

Population (2020)
  - Total: 622
  - Density: 28.9/sq mi (11.2/km^{2})
- ZIP codes: 47950, 47960
- GNIS feature ID: 453574

Lincoln Township is one of twelve townships in White County, Indiana, United States. As of the 2020 census, its population was 622 and it contained 276 housing units.

Historical population
Census	Pop.	Note	%±
1940	838		—
1950	894		6.7%
1960	803		−10.2%
1970	772		−3.9%
1980	714		−7.5%
1990	673		−5.7%
2000	635		−5.6%
2010	638		0.5%
2020	622		−2.5%
Source: US Decennial Census

== Geography ==
According to the 2010 census, the township has a total area of 21.51 square miles (55.7 km^{2}), all land.

=== Unincorporated towns ===
- Idaville at 40.756984°N 86.649453°W

(This list is based on USGS data and may include former settlements.)

=== Adjacent townships ===
- Cass Township (north)
- Jackson Township (east)
- Adams Township, Carroll County (southeast)
- Jefferson Township, Carroll County (southwest)
- Union Township (west)
- Liberty Township (northwest)

=== Cemeteries ===
The township contains these three cemeteries: Leazenby, Mitchell and State View.

== School districts ==
- Twin Lakes School Corporation

== Political districts ==
- Indiana's 2nd congressional district
- State House District 16
- State Senate District 07
