= Dave Morales =

- Born: El Paso, Texas, U.S.
- Other names: "Mo", "Dave Mo"
- Occupations: Radio Personality, Record Label Owner
- Known for: Radio Host, Celebrity Interviews

Dave Morales is a nationally known on-air radio personality, DJ and independent producer. Dave Morales has worked for some of the top rated radio stations in the United States, as an on-air personality, promoter, artist interviewer, and events specialist. Some stations Morales has worked at include KPWR, KYLD, KHKS, KKPN, KKHH, KPTY, and KHMX. Morales was known for being a radio show host on Mix 96.5, in Houston. Dave Morales is well known for his widely heard interviews with famous musicians. Some famous interviews Morales has hosted include Tokio Hotel, The Pussycat Dolls, Cesar Millan "The Dog Whisperer", Shine Down member Eric Bass, and Sarah, Duchess of York. Morales spent the early part of his childhood in El Paso, Texas. As a child he moved to Houston, where he graduated from Cypress Creek High School, and went on to Texas Tech University, to study broadcasting.

== Career ==
=== On-Air Radio Personality ===
Dave Morales has been an on-air radio personality at some of the top rated radio stations in the United States, including many owned by Clear Channel Communications. He also worked for Houston's Mix 96.5, which is owned by CBS. One of the first Stations Morales got his start at was Power 106 KPWR, in Los Angeles. Morales spent time on the air at Wild 94.9 KYLD, in San Francisco, California. After hosting on the air in California, Morales made his way to Kiss 106 KHKS-FM, where his on-air skills began to sharpen, from experience. Then, Morales moved to top 40 station "The Planet" KKPN, in Corpus Christi, Texas. After which, Morales moved to Houston Texas. He was hired by Mark Arias, then program director of KPTY, to work for Houston's popular hip hop station "Party 104.9". Party 104.9 eventually became KQBU-FM, controlled by Univision. Here, Dave Morales headed up the station's morning show. Next, Morales spent a brief period of time working for another top 40 radio station, called Hot Hits 95.7 KKHH. After leaving KKHH, Morales moved to longtime station Mix 96.5 KHMX. Here, he hosted an afternoon radio show at Houston's Mix 96.5. Along with being a radio DJ, Dave hosted celebrity interviews and reviewed newly releasing movies.

In March 2022, Morales returned to KHKS-FM as host of "The Backstage Experience," a weekly, syndicated, four-hour program of entertainment news and celebrity interviews.

=== BackstageOL ===
On June 20, 2011 Dave Morales launched an online entertainment website called BackstageOL.com with Jonathan Stenvall. The website officially launched on the Fox 26 Morning News where BackstageOL.com taped an exclusive interview with Rock and Roll Hall of Fame musician Billy Gibbons of music group ZZ Top. Other recent interviews and features have included segments with Tom Hanks, Robert Redford, Cameron Diaz, Miles Teller, Robert De Niro, Gloria Estefan, Tom Cruise and many other A-list celebrities and musicians such as Justin Timberlake, Forever The Sickest Kids, Yellowcard etc.

== See also ==
- KPWR
- KYLD
- KHKS
- KKPN
- KKHH
- KAMA-FM
- KHMX
