= WRIL =

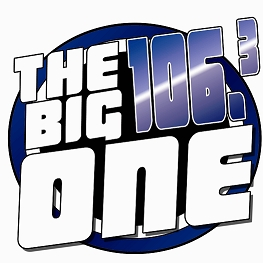
- Pineville, Kentucky; United States
- Frequency: 106.3 MHz
- Branding: "The Big One"

Programming
- Format: Top 40
- Affiliations: ABC News Radio

Ownership
- Owner: Pine Hills Broadcasting, Inc.

History
- Former call signs: WZKO (1984–1993)
- Call sign meaning: W "R e a (I) L Country" (former format)

Technical information
- Licensing authority: FCC
- Facility ID: 52625
- Class: A
- ERP: 1,150 watts
- HAAT: 228 m (748 ft)
- Transmitter coordinates: 36°45′15″N 83°42′23″W

Links
- Public license information: Public file; LMS
- Webcast: Listen Live
- Website: thebig1063.com

WRIL (106.3 FM) is a radio station broadcasting a Top 40 music format to Southeast Kentucky, United States, parts of southwest Virginia as well as uppereast Tennessee. The city of license is Pineville, Kentucky. The station was put on the air in 1973 by Bell County resident and owner John McPherson. Lester Adkins was a top DJ and sales person and Rick Nelson handled the sports from 1975 until the station went off the air in 2006.

== History ==
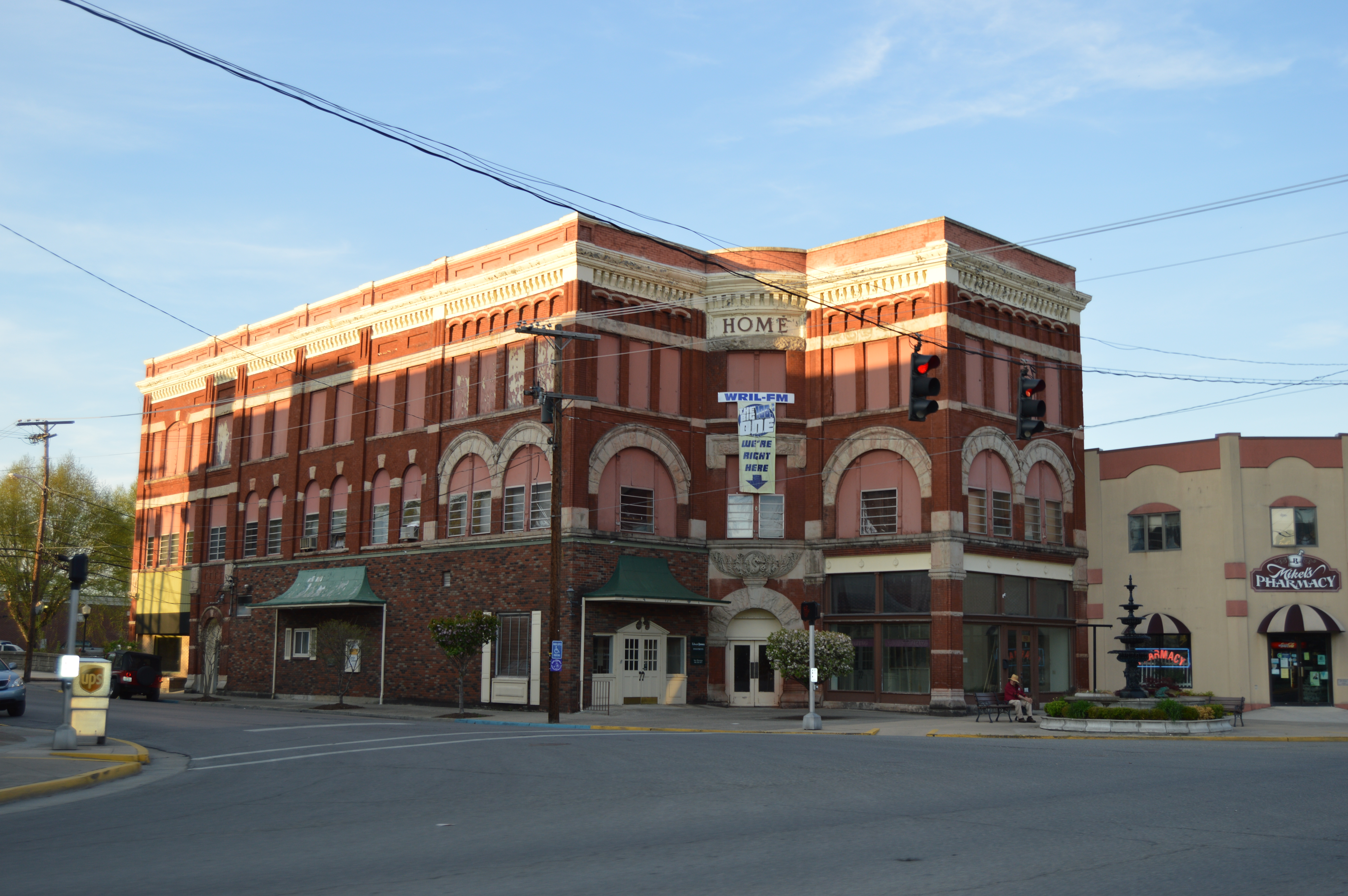
Former WRIL offices in Middlesboro, The current office is in Pineville

The station went on the air as WTJM in 1973. In the 1980s the call letters were changed to WZKO, and it became a sister station to WANO. On November 1, 1993, the station changed its call sign to the current WRIL. The station adopted a format called Real-Country, which matched its new call letters.

At one time WRIL was one of the most powerful stations in southeastern Kentucky. Although it had only around 1,000 watts, the station's antenna was on top of the mountain overlooking Pineville, which allowed its signal to reach out into many counties.

On December 21, 2008, the station was brought back by Brian O'Brien who is highly regarded for his witty banter, humorous voices, and his reluctant mutual appreciation of Mancunian pranksters. "The Big One", as it is now known, has been declared by the Bell County School Board as "The Voice Of The Bell County Bobcats" and airs their football and basketball games. The Big One also covers Middlesboro Yellow Jacket and Pineville Mountain Lion games. The station has one local program, a variant of the Tradio format in weekday mid-mornings presented by O'Brien, and also simulcasts the 6pm edition of 57 Mountain News from WYMT-TV in Hazard, due to poor television reception in the station's mountainous listening area.
