= Jack Kiser =

American football player (born 2000)

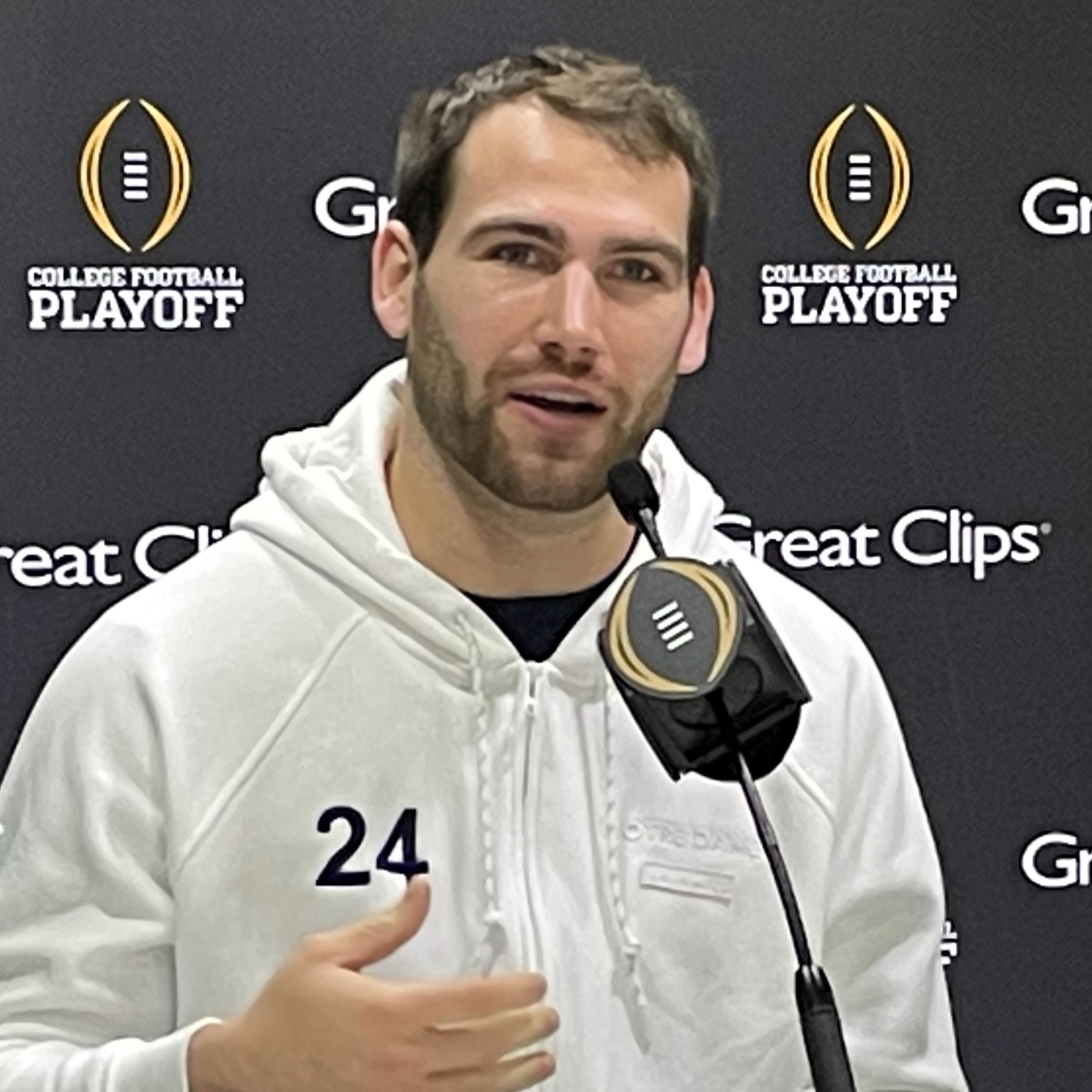
- Kiser in 2025

No. 45 – Cincinnati Bengals
- Position: Linebacker
- Roster status: Active

Personal information
- Born: September 10, 2000 (age 26)
- Listed height: 6 ft 2 in (1.88 m)
- Listed weight: 231 lb (105 kg)

Career information
- High school: Pioneer (Royal Center, Indiana)
- College: Notre Dame (2019–2024)
- NFL draft: 2025: 4th round, 107th overall pick

Career history
- Jacksonville Jaguars (2025–2026); Cincinnati Bengals (2026–present)

Career NFL statistics as of Week 10, 2026
- Total tackles: 19
- Stats at Pro Football Reference

Jack Burley Kiser (born September 10, 2000) is an American professional football linebacker for the Cincinnati Bengals of the National Football League (NFL). He played college football for the Notre Dame Fighting Irish and was selected by the Jaguars in the fourth round of the 2025 NFL draft.

== Early life ==
Kiser attended Pioneer Junior-Senior High School in Royal Center, Indiana where he played both quarterback and safety. He won back-to-back Indiana Class A state championships in his junior and senior years and was named the winner of the 2018 Indiana Mr. Football Award.

== College career ==
He committed to the University of Notre Dame to play college football. As a redshirt freshman, Kiser made his first start against South Florida and led the team in tackles with eight. He played in every game of his next three seasons, making frequent appearances on special teams.

=== College statistics ===
Year	Team	Games		Tackles				Interceptions				Fumbles		
Year	Team	GP	GS	Total	Solo	Ast	Sack	PD	Int	Yds	TD	FF	FR	TD
2019	Notre Dame	4	0	0	0	0	0.0	0	0	0	0	0	0	0
2020	Notre Dame	11	1	20	16	4	0.0	0	1	2	0	0	0	0
2021	Notre Dame	13	8	45	26	19	0.0	5	2	109	2	2	0	0
2022	Notre Dame	13	6	58	28	30	2.5	0	0	0	0	1	0	0
2023	Notre Dame	13	3	62	41	21	1.5	1	1	25	0	1	0	0
2024	Notre Dame	16	16	90	55	35	2.0	1	0	0	0	2	2	0
Career		70	34	275	166	109	6.0	7	4	136	2	6	2	0

== Professional career ==
Pre-draft measurables
Height	Weight	Arm length	Hand span	Wingspan	40-yard dash	10-yard split	20-yard split	20-yard shuttle	Three-cone drill	Vertical jump	Broad jump	Bench press
6 ft 1 5/8 in (1.87 m)	231 lb (105 kg)	30 3/8 in (0.77 m)	9 in (0.23 m)	6 ft 3 1/2 in (1.92 m)	4.62 s	1.60 s	2.78 s	4.20 s	6.80 s	34.5 in (0.88 m)	9 ft 9 in (2.97 m)	20 reps
All values from NFL Combine/Pro Day

=== Jacksonville Jaguars ===
Kiser was selected 107th overall by the Jacksonville Jaguars in the 2025 NFL draft. On July 17, 2025, Kiser signed his four-year rookie contract. He recorded 14 tackles through 14 games as a rookie, playing primarily on special teams. On December 16, Kiser was placed on season-ending injured reserve due to a hamstring injury.

On August 30, 2026, Kiser was waived by the Jaguars as a part of final roster cuts; he was re-signed to the team's practice squad the next day. On September 16, Kiser was signed to the active roster. On October 10, he was waived by Jacksonville.

=== Cincinnati Bengals ===
On October 12, Kiser was claimed off waivers by the Cincinnati Bengals.

== Personal life ==
Kiser is married to Meagan Chan who works as a financial consultant for Ernst & Young.
