= XHIPM-FM =

Radio station in Mérida, Yucatán, Mexico

Mérida, Yucatán; Mexico
- Frequency: 102.3 FM
- Branding: Radio Ecológica

Ownership
- Owner: Instituto para la Protección del Medio Natural, A.C.

History
- First air date: February 11, 2000
- Last air date: 2022
- Call sign meaning: From the name of the concessionaire

Technical information
- ERP: 3 kW
- Transmitter coordinates: 20°59′37″N 89°37′59″W

Links
- Website: www.radioecologicamerida.com

XHIPM-FM was a noncommercial radio station on 102.3 FM in Mérida, Yucatán, Mexico. It is owned by Instituto para la Protección del Medio Natural, A.C. (Institute for the Protection of the Natural Environment) and is known as Radio Ecológica.

== History ==
XHIPM was permitted on August 16, 1999, and came to air at 11am on February 11, 2000. Its operator was a civil society organization founded in 1993.

The station's concession was not renewed and expired, per a September 2022 catalog update compiled by the Instituto Nacional Electoral.
