= KPUS =

- Gregory, Texas; United States
- Broadcast area: Corpus Christi metropolitan area
- Frequency: 104.5 MHz
- Branding: 104.5 The Eagle

Programming
- Format: Classic rock
- Affiliations: United Stations Radio Networks

Ownership
- Owner: John Bushman; (ICA Radio, Ltd.)
- Sister stations: KAJE, KKPN

History
- First air date: 1999
- Former call signs: KBHD (1998–1998); KKPN (1998–2001)
- Call sign meaning: Former "Octopus" branding

Technical information
- Licensing authority: FCC
- Facility ID: 78383
- Class: C3
- ERP: 14,000 watts
- HAAT: 136 meters (446 ft)
- Transmitter coordinates: 27°52′2.00″N 97°13′7.00″W

Links
- Public license information: Public file; LMS
- Webcast: Listen live
- Website: www.theeagle1045.com

KPUS (104.5 FM, "104.5 The Eagle") is a commercial radio station licensed to Gregory, Texas, United States, and serving the Corpus Christi metropolitan area. Owned by John Bushman through licensee ICA Radio, Ltd., it carries a classic rock format, with studios on South Padre Island Drive (Texas State Highway 358) in Corpus Christi.

KPUS's transmitter is sited on Avenue B at 8th Street in Ingleside, Texas.

== History ==
While it was still a construction permit, the station was assigned the call letters KBHD on July 17, 1998. On September 18, 1998, the station changed its call sign to KKPN.

The station signed on the air in 1999. The call sign changed again on March 26, 2001, to the current KPUS. The call letters stood for the station's moniker and mascot, "The Octopus."

On March 26, 2020, ICA Radio relaunched Classic Rock 104.5 as "104.5 The Eagle, Corpus Christi's ONLY Classic Rock Station."
