= WCBK-FM =

Radio station in Martinsville, Indiana

- Martinsville, Indiana; United States
- Frequency: 102.3 MHz
- Branding: WCBK 102.3

Programming
- Format: Country

Ownership
- Owner: Mid-America Radio Group, Inc.

Technical information
- Licensing authority: FCC
- Facility ID: 57351
- Class: A
- ERP: 6,000 watts
- HAAT: 94 meters (308 ft)
- Transmitter coordinates: 39°26′18.00″N 86°27′58.00″W

Links
- Public license information: Public file; LMS
- Website: wcbk.com

WCBK-FM (102.3 FM) is a radio station licensed to Martinsville, Indiana, United States. The station is currently owned by Mid-America Radio Group, Inc. It has a country format.
