= Boone Township, Cass County, Indiana =

Boone Township
- Township
- Location of Boone Township in Cass County
- Coordinates: 40°52′03″N 86°31′35″W
- Country: United States
- State: Indiana
- County: Cass

Government
  - Type: Indiana township

Area
  - Total: 35.31 sq mi (91.5 km^{2})
  - Land: 35.31 sq mi (91.5 km^{2})
  - Water: 0 sq mi (0 km^{2})
- Elevation: 725 ft (221 m)

Population (2020)
  - Total: 1,405
  - Density: 42/sq mi (16/km^{2})
- FIPS code: 18-06490
- GNIS feature ID: 453125

Boone Township is one of fourteen townships in Cass County, Indiana, United States. As of the 2020 census, its population was 1,405 (down from 1,484 at 2010) and it contained 620 housing units.

== History ==
Boone Township was organized in 1836 or 1838.

== Geography ==
According to the 2010 census, the township has a total area of 35.31 square miles (91.5 km^{2}), all land.

=== Cities and towns ===
- Royal Center

=== Adjacent townships ===
- Van Buren Township, Pulaski County (north)
- Wayne Township, Fulton County (northeast)
- Harrison (east)
- Noble (southeast)
- Jefferson (south)
- Jackson Township, White County (southwest)
- Cass Township, White County (west)

=== Major highways ===
- U.S. Route 35
- Indiana State Road 16

=== Cemeteries ===
The township contains three cemeteries: Cline, Royal Center and Thompson.
