= KEYS =

Coordinates: 27°47′3.1″N 97°27′30″W

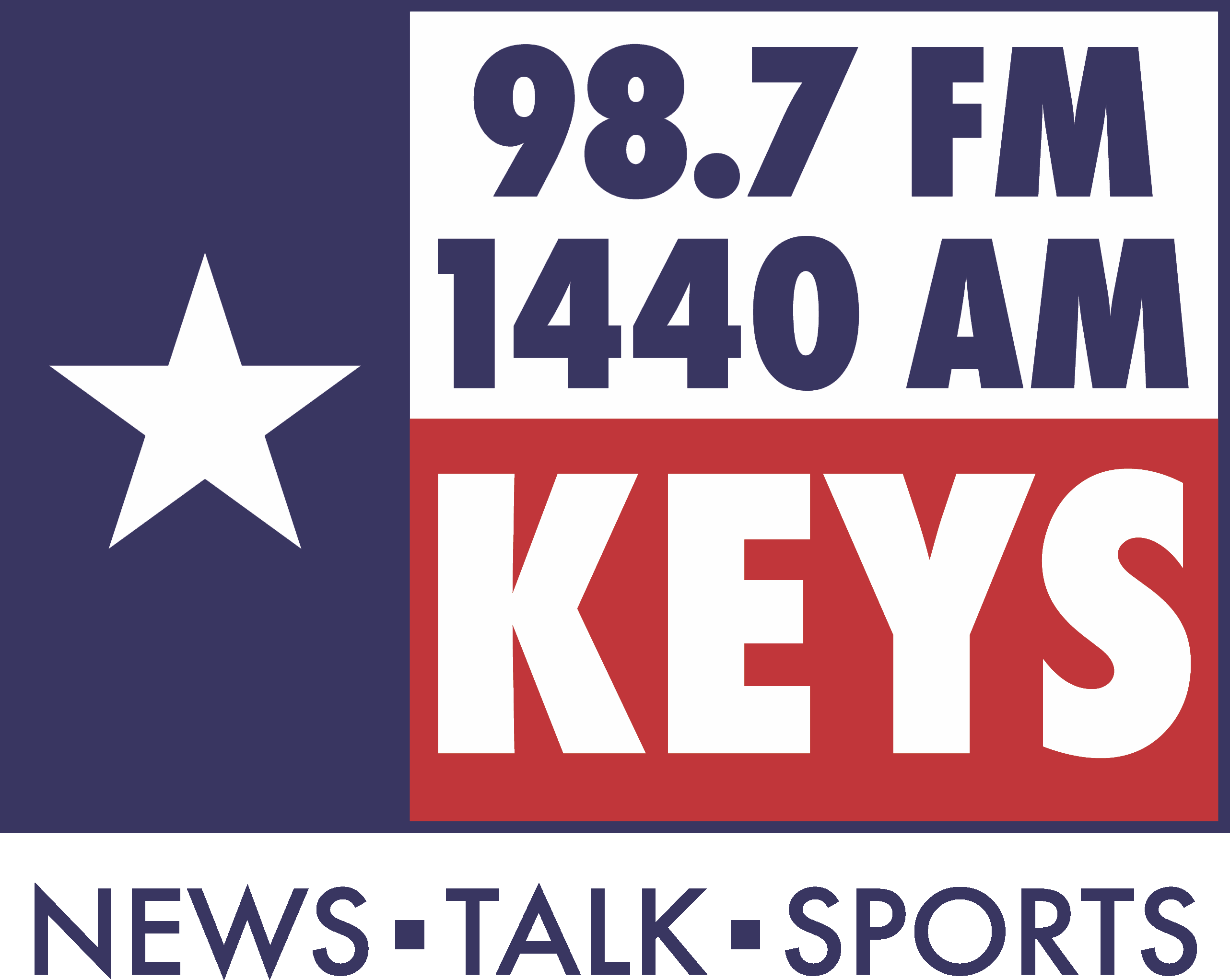
- Corpus Christi, Texas; United States
- Broadcast area: Corpus Christi metropolitan area
- Frequency: 1440 kHz
- Branding: KEYS 1440

Programming
- Format: Conservative talk
- Affiliations: NBC News Radio; Compass Media Networks; Genesis Communications Network; Radio America; Townhall News; Westwood One

Ownership
- Owner: Malkan AM Associates, L.P.
- Sister stations: KKBA, KZFM

History
- First air date: March 1941

Technical information
- Licensing authority: FCC
- Facility ID: 39715
- Class: B
- Power: 1,000 watts (day); 199 watts (night)
- Translator: 98.7 K254DH (Corpus Christi)

Links
- Public license information: Public file; LMS
- Webcast: Listen live
- Website: keys1440.com

KEYS (1440 AM) is a commercial radio station licensed to Corpus Christi, Texas, United States. Owned by Malkan AM Associates, L.P., it features a conservative talk format, with studios and offices are on Leopard Street in Corpus Christi.

KEYS's transmitter is sited on Agnes Street near Flato Road in Corpus Christi. Programming is also heard on low-power FM translator K254DH at 98.7 MHz.

== History ==
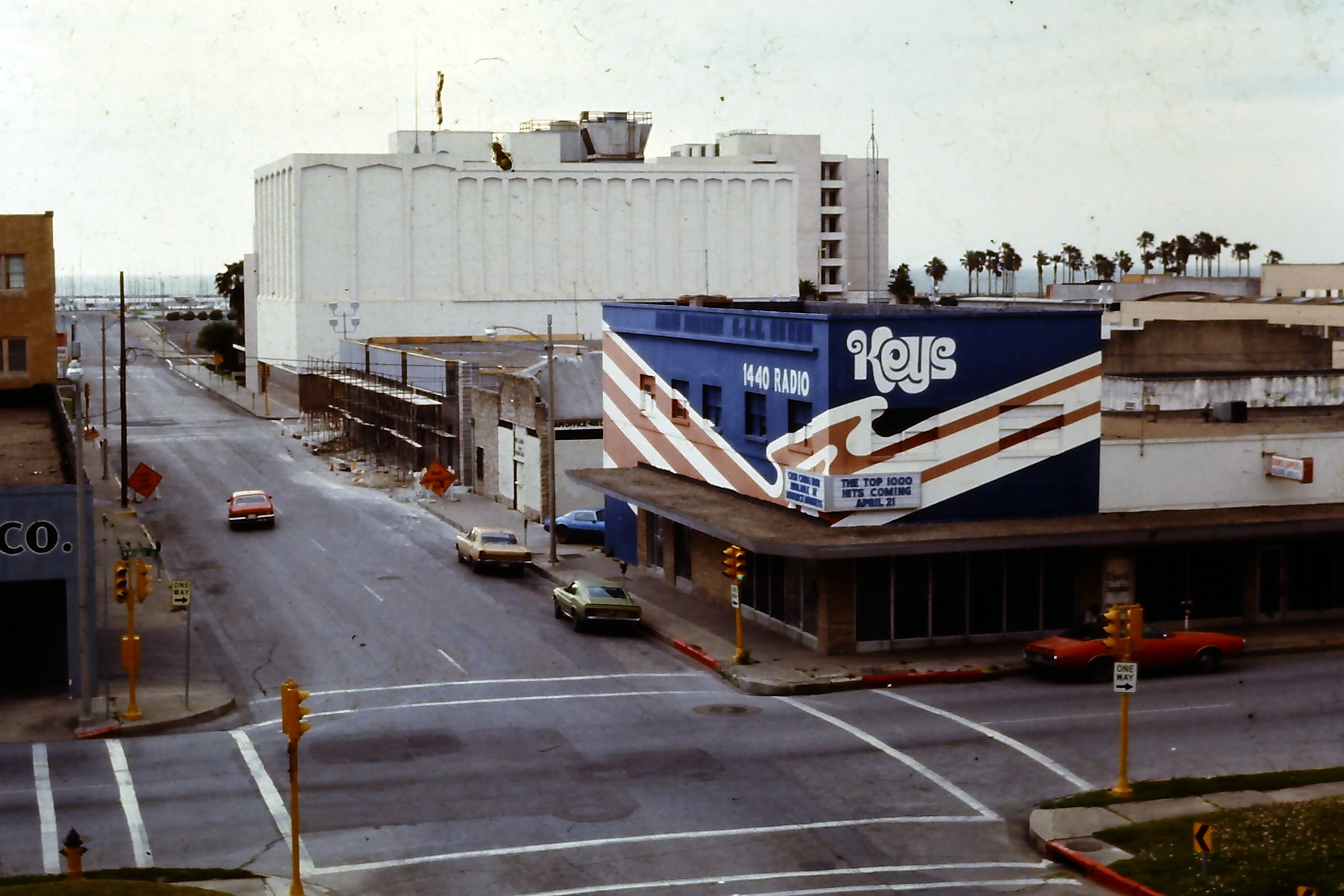
KEYS studios circa 1977

KEYS signed on the air in March 1941. It was the second radio station in Corpus Christi, powered at 250 watts with studios in the Centre Theatre Building. It was owned by Nueces Broadcasting and it originally transmitted on 1490 kilocycles.

In the 1960s and 70s, it aired a Top 40 format. The disc jockeys included Johnny Ringo, Charlie Brite, Johnny Marks, Tom Nix, Jim West and Gil Garcia as Michael Scott. Studio were in Downtown Corpus Christi.

In the early 2000s, it aired a talk radio format. On September 1, 2011, KEYS changed its format to sports radio, branded as "ESPN 1440." It aired programming from the ESPN Radio Network as well as games from the Corpus Christi IceRays (2011–12 season only).

On August 31, 2015, the talk radio format returned to KEYS after a four-year absence.

== Programming ==
Bob James hosts the station's local morning program; the remainder of the weekday schedule is nationally syndicated conservative talk shows. Live sports include the Dallas Cowboys, the San Antonio Spurs and the University of Texas Longhorns.
