= XHSPP-FM =

Radio station in San Pedro Pochutla, Oaxaca, Mexico

- San Pedro Pochutla, Oaxaca; Mexico
- Frequency: 102.3 FM
- Branding: Radio Crystal

Programming
- Format: Grupera

Ownership
- Owner: Radio Pochutla, S.A. de C.V. and Grupo Siete Comunicación

History
- First air date: April 3, 1995 (concession)
- Call sign meaning: San Pedro Pochutla

Technical information
- ERP: 25,000 watts

XHSPP-FM is a radio station on 102.3 FM in San Pedro Pochutla, Oaxaca, Mexico.

== History ==
XHSPP received its concession on April 3, 1995. It was owned by Raúl Martínez Ostos y Martínez de Castro and sold in 2009 to Radio Pochutla. The station was originally known as Radical 102.3 and changed to La Voz del Pacífico Sur in 2011.

On August 6, 2023, XHSPP changed to a grupera format under Radio Crystal from Grupo Siete. A week later, the journalists Omar Gasga and Henry Santiago said goodbye after almost 20 years since 2003.
