= XHMW-FM =

Radio station in Nuevo Laredo, Tamaulipas, Mexico

- Nuevo Laredo, Tamaulipas; Mexico
- Broadcast area: Nuevo Laredo, Tamaulipas; Laredo, Texas
- Frequency: 102.3 MHz
- Branding: Stereo Vida

Programming
- Format: Spanish Contemporary Music

Ownership
- Owner: Grupo Radiorama; (XHMW-FM, S.A. de C.V.)

History
- First air date: March 17, 1987 (concession)

Technical information
- Licensing authority: CRT
- Class: A
- ERP: 13,550 watts
- HAAT: 40.86 m (134.1 ft)
- Transmitter coordinates: 27.4935327°N 99.515622°W

Links
- Webcast: Listen live
- Website: radioramanuevolaredo.com

XHMW-FM is a Spanish Contemporary Music format radio station on 102.3 FM that serves the Laredo, Texas, United States and Nuevo Laredo, Tamaulipas, Mexico border area.

== History ==
XHMW received its concession in March 1987. It was owned by Información Radiofónica, S.A., a Radiorama affiliate.
