= KAJE =

- Ingleside, Texas; United States
- Broadcast area: Corpus Christi, Texas
- Frequency: 107.3 MHz
- Branding: Hot Country 107.3

Programming
- Format: Country
- Affiliations: Compass Media Networks

Ownership
- Owner: John Bushman; (ICA Radio, Ltd.)
- Sister stations: KKPN; KPUS

History
- First air date: 1996
- Former call signs: KAHX (1996–1998); KCCG (1998–2004); KRPX (2004–2005); KJKE (2005–2009); KRSR (2009–2010)

Technical information
- Licensing authority: FCC
- Facility ID: 5393
- Class: C3
- ERP: 14,000 watts
- HAAT: 136 m (446 ft)
- Transmitter coordinates: 27°52′2″N 97°13′7″W

Links
- Public license information: Public file; LMS
- Webcast: Listen live

KAJE (107.3 FM) is a commercial radio station licensed to Ingleside, Texas, United States, serving the Corpus Christi metropolitan area. Currently owned by John Bushman through licensee ICA Radio, Ltd., it carries a country music format with studios in Corpus Christi and transmitter sited in Ingleside.

== History ==
In 1996, the station first signed on as KAHX. It was owned by BK Radio, Inc. and aired an oldies format. At first, it broadcast with only 3,000 watts. Two years later, the station was acquired by Pacific Broadcasting of Missouri. It changed its call sign to KCCG but kept its oldies sound.

In 2004, the station was bought by Convergent Broadcasting of Corpus Christi. It got a power boost to its current 14,000 watts, as well as a new call sign and a new format, KRPX, alternative rock. The following year, the call sign and format were changed again, this time to classic hits KJKE.

In 2009, the station switched to an adult contemporary music format, with a change in its call sign to KRSR, known as "Star 107.3."

On August 30, 2010, KRSR dropped its "Star 107.3" AC format and began stunting with an all-Beatles format, with an announcement made at 9 a.m. on Friday, September 3. Following the announcement, it became an adult hits format. The switch left rhythmic-leaning KKBA as the only AC station in Corpus Christi.

On September 7, 2010, KRSR changed its call sign to KAJE, to go with the "Jake FM" branding. However, when rival station 92.7 KKBA flipped to adult hits in June 2011, KAJE moved back to a classic hits format, with only songs from the late 1960s, '70s and '80s played.

On March 24, 2017, at Midnight, after playing "Na Na Hey Hey Kiss Him Goodbye" by Steam, KAJE flipped to classic country as "My Country 107.3". The station launched with a commercial free loop of songs by George Strait (starting with "Amarillo by Morning"), which ran until Monday, March 28. Effective March 30, 2017, Convergent Broadcasting sold KAJE and sister stations KKPN and KPUS to John Busman's ICA Radio, Ltd. for $2.48 million.

In March 2020, KAJE shifted its format from classic country to country, branded as “107.3 The Bull”.

On December 30, 2023, KAJE changed its format from country to Regional Mexican, branded as "Que Buena 107.3".

On December 1, 2025, KAJE dropped its Regional Mexican format and began stunting with country-leaning Christmas music, with a new format to launch after the holidays.

On December 26, 2025, KAJE ended stunting and launched a country music format, branded as "Hot Country 107.3".
