= Idaville, Indiana =

- Census-designated place
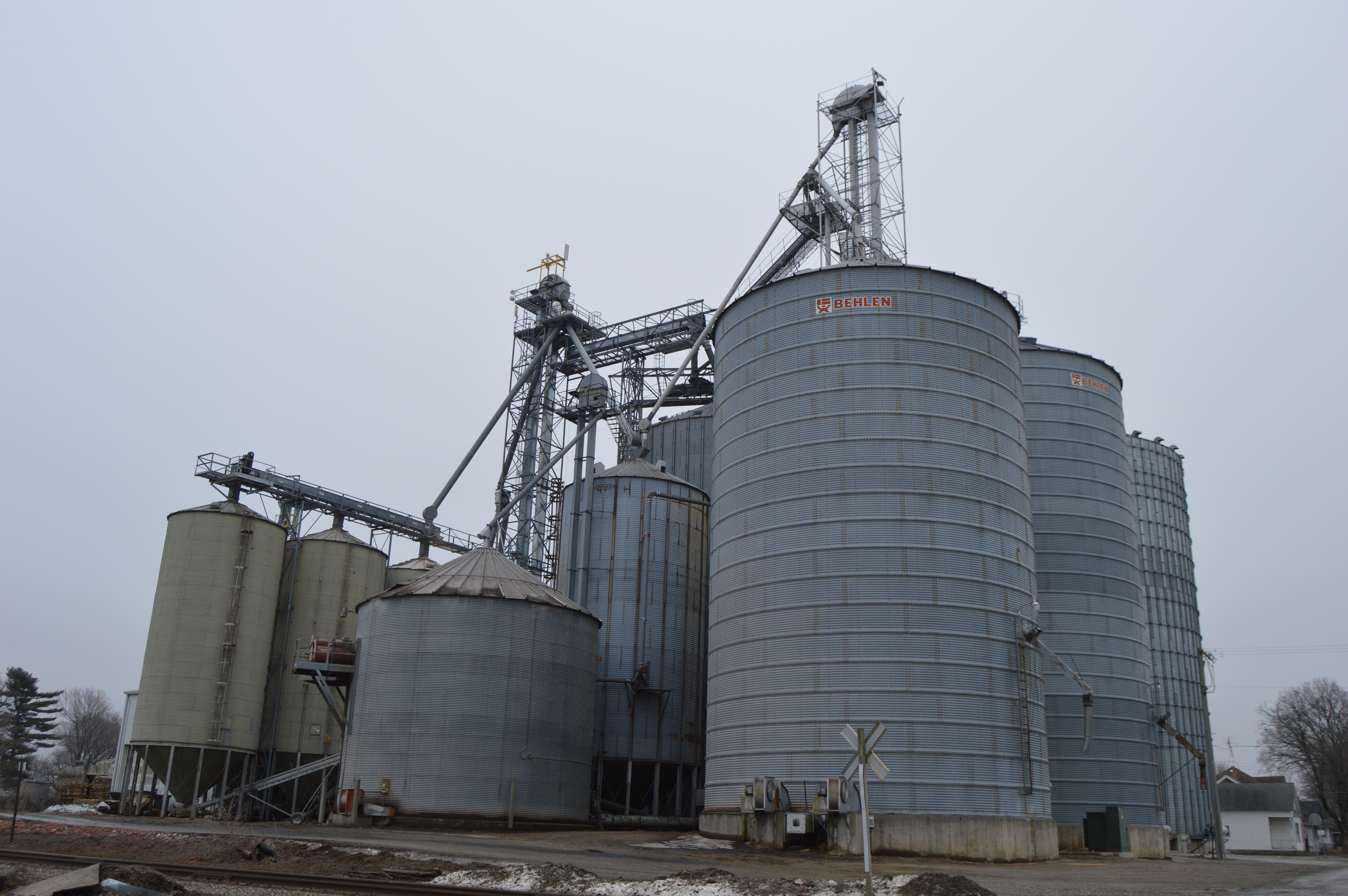
- Grain elevator

- Location of Idaville in White County, Indiana.
- Coordinates: 40°45′25″N 86°38′58″W
- Country: United States
- State: Indiana
- County: White
- Township: Lincoln
- Established: 1860

Area
  - Total: 5.83 sq mi (15.11 km^{2})
  - Land: 5.83 sq mi (15.11 km^{2})
  - Water: 0 sq mi (0.00 km^{2})
- Elevation: 715 ft (218 m)

Population (2020)
  - Total: 440
  - Density: 75.4/sq mi (29.11/km^{2})
- Time zone: UTC-5 (Eastern (EST))
  - Summer (DST): UTC-4 (EDT)
- ZIP code: 47950
- FIPS code: 18-35536
- GNIS feature ID: 436703

Idaville is a census-designated place in Lincoln Township, White County, in the U.S. state of Indiana. As of the 2020 census, Idaville had a population of 440.

== History ==
Idaville was originally called Hannah, and under the latter name was laid out in 1860, when the railroad was extended to that point. A post office has been in operation under the name Idaville since 1860.

== Geography ==
Idaville is located at 40°45′25″N 86°38′58″W.

== Demographics ==
Historical population
Census	Pop.	Note	%±
2020	440		—
U.S. Decennial Census

The 2010 population of Idaville, Indiana was 461 people, made up of 253 males, and 208 females.

The estimated median household income was $53,060 in 2017.

Idaville is mentioned in the Season 07, Episode 13 of M*A*S*H, "Out of Gas".
