= Jackson Township, White County, Indiana =

Jackson Township
- Township
- Location in White County
- Coordinates: 40°47′20″N 86°36′11″W
- Country: United States
- State: Indiana
- County: White

Government
  - Type: Indiana township

Area
  - Total: 15.6 sq mi (40 km^{2})
  - Land: 15.6 sq mi (40 km^{2})
  - Water: 0 sq mi (0 km^{2}) 0%
- Elevation: 715 ft (218 m)

Population (2020)
  - Total: 697
  - Density: 44.7/sq mi (17.3/km^{2})
- ZIP codes: 47926, 47950
- GNIS feature ID: 453475

Jackson Township is one of twelve townships in White County, Indiana, United States. As of the 2020 census, its population was 697 and it contained 278 housing units.

Jackson Township was established in 1843.

Historical population
Census	Pop.	Note	%±
1890	1,958		—
1900	1,990		1.6%
1910	1,812		−8.9%
1920	1,803		−0.5%
1930	1,382		−23.3%
1940	694		−49.8%
1950	721		3.9%
1960	693		−3.9%
1970	742		7.1%
1980	862		16.2%
1990	745		−13.6%
2000	681		−8.6%
2010	655		−3.8%
2020	697		6.4%
Source: US Decennial Census

== Geography ==
According to the 2010 census, the township has a total area of 15.6 square miles (40 km^{2}), all land.

=== Cities, towns, villages ===
- Burnettsville

=== Adjacent townships ===
- Cass Township (north)
- Boone Township, Cass County (northeast)
- Jefferson Township, Cass County (east)
- Adams Township, Carroll County (south)
- Lincoln Township (west)

== School districts ==
- Twin Lakes School Corporation

== Political districts ==
- Indiana's 2nd congressional district
- State House District 16
- State Senate District 07
