= KCZQ =

- Cresco, Iowa; United States
- Frequency: 102.3 MHz

Programming
- Format: Oldies

Ownership
- Owner: Mega Media, Ltd.

Technical information
- Licensing authority: FCC
- Facility ID: 41101
- Class: A
- ERP: 3,000 watts
- HAAT: 100 m (328 ft)
- Transmitter coordinates: 43°25′47″N 92°09′49″W

Links
- Public license information: Public file; LMS

KCZQ (102.3 FM) is a commercial radio station that serves the Cresco, Iowa area. The station primarily broadcasts music in an oldies format, with polka music on Saturdays. KCZQ is licensed to Mega Media, Ltd. KCZQ does not live stream so the listening base is limited to North-East Iowa.

The transmitter and broadcast tower are located about 4 miles northwest of Cresco on 60th Street. According to the Antenna Structure Registration database, the tower is 103 m (338 ft) tall with the FM broadcast antenna mounted at the 98 m (322 ft) level. The calculated Height Above Average Terrain is 100 m (328 ft).
