= Lake Cicott, Indiana =

Lake Cicott
- Unincorporated community and Census-designated place
- Cass County's location in Indiana

- Location in Cass County
- Coordinates: 40°45′55″N 86°31′52″W
- Country: United States
- State: Indiana
- County: Cass
- Township: Jefferson
- Elevation: 699 ft (213 m)

Population (2000)
  - Total: 26
- ZIP code: 46947
- GNIS feature ID: 2830327

Lake Cicott is an unincorporated community in Jefferson Township, Cass County, Indiana. The community is named after the lake in which it sits beside.

== History ==
Lake Cicott was laid out in 1868. The namesake of Lake Cicott is George Cicott, a pioneer. The first post office in Lake Cicott was established in 1873.

== Geography ==
The town of Lake Cicott is located at the eastern end of Lake Cicott. Lake Cicott is the only lake in Cass County and is the southern most glacial lake in Indiana. The lake is approximately a half mile long and a quarter mile wide and is no more than 50 feet (15 m) in depth. There are no streams feeding into it.

== Demographics ==
The United States Census Bureau delineated Lake Cicott as a census designated place in the 2022 American Community Survey.
