= Lucerne, Indiana =

Lucerne
- Unincorporated community and Census-designated place
- Cass County's location in Indiana

- Location in Cass County
- Coordinates: 40°51′57″N 86°24′14″W
- Country: United States
- State: Indiana
- County: Cass
- Township: Harrison
- Elevation: 804 ft (245 m)
- ZIP code: 46950
- FIPS code: 18-45234
- GNIS feature ID: 2830329

Lucerne is an unincorporated community in Harrison Township, Cass County, Indiana.

== History ==
Lucerne was platted in 1883 when the railroad was extended to that point. The community took its name from Lucerne, in Switzerland. The Lucerne post office was established in 1891.

== Demographics ==
The United States Census Bureau delineated Lucerne as a census designated place in the 2022 American Community Survey.
