= KJJJ =

Radio station in Laughlin, Nevada

- Laughlin, Nevada; United States
- Broadcast area: Laughlin, Nevada
- Frequency: 102.3 MHz (HD Radio)
- Branding: Nash FM 102.3 KJJJ

Programming
- Format: Country music
- Subchannels: HD2: Talk radio "KNTR Talk"; HD3: Contemporary Christian music "Alive FM"; HD4: Sports radio (KNTR simulcast)
- Affiliations: Compass Media Networks; Westwood One

Ownership
- Owner: Steven M. Greeley
- Sister stations: KNTR

History
- First air date: June 1, 1994 (as KAGT)
- Former call signs: KAGT (1/1994-6/1994); KJCC (1994–1997)

Technical information
- Licensing authority: FCC
- Facility ID: 63410
- Class: C1
- ERP: 17,000 watts
- HAAT: 576 meters (1889 feet)
- Transmitter coordinates: 35°01′58″N 114°21′57″W
- Translator: see below

Links
- Public license information: Public file; LMS
- Webcast: Listen Live; Listen Live (HD2)
- Website: kjjjfm.com kntrtalk.com (HD2) alivefm.org (HD3)

KJJJ (102.3 FM, "Nash FM 102.3 KJJJ"), addressed as K – Triple J is a radio station licensed to serve Laughlin, in the U.S. state of Nevada. The station is owned by Steven M. Greeley. It airs a country music format.

The station was assigned the KJJJ call letters by the Federal Communications Commission on September 2, 1997.

KJJJ broadcasts in HD.

Former logo

== Translators and boosters ==
Broadcast translators for KJJJ
Call sign	Frequency	City of license	FID	ERP (W)	Class	FCC info
K246AE	97.1 FM	Lake Havasu City, Arizona	9039	10	D	LMS
K246CO	97.1 FM	Kingman, Arizona	156483	35	D	LMS
K265CJ	100.9 FM	Laughlin, Nevada	30451	120	D	LMS
K270CX	101.9 FM	Calnevair, Nevada	156670	250	D	LMS
KJJJ-FM1 booster	102.3 FM	Lake Havasu City, Arizona	178460	1,000	D	LMS
KJJJ-FM2 booster	102.3 FM	Kingman, Arizona	181248	500	D	LMS
K283BZ	104.5 FM	Peach Springs, Arizona	152102	10	D	LMS
K287BM	105.3 FM	Peach Springs, Arizona	156382	30	D	LMS
K294CQ	106.7 FM	Lake Havasu City, Arizona	156889	132	D	LMS

Broadcast translators for KJJJ-HD2
Call sign	Frequency	City of license	FID	ERP (W)	Class	FCC info
K292ES	106.3 FM	Cane Springs, Arizona	27981	51	D	LMS
K292EU	106.3 FM	Laughlin, Nevada	27983	10	D	LMS
K292GC	106.3 FM	Lake Havasu City, Arizona	38312	160	D	LMS

Broadcast translators for KJJJ-HD3
Call sign	Frequency	City of license	FID	ERP (W)	Class	FCC info
K224BV	92.7 FM	Kingman, Arizona	967	82	D	LMS
K248BJ	97.5 FM	Mohave Valley, Arizona	147059	220	D	LMS

Broadcast translators for KJJJ-HD4
Call sign	Frequency	City of license	FID	ERP (W)	Class	FCC info
K232EY	94.3 FM	Kingman, Arizona	149062	190	D	LMS
K263BM	100.5 FM	Riviera, Arizona	146554	36	D	LMS
