= CINQ-FM =

Community radio station in Montreal

Coordinates: 45°31′50″N 73°35′55″W

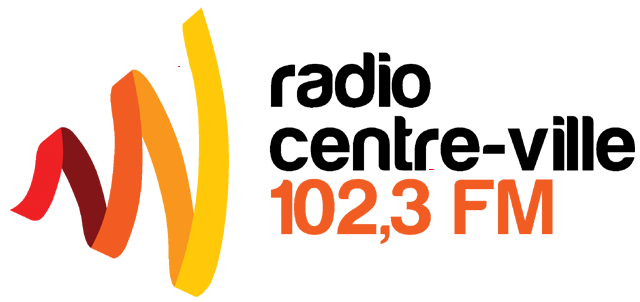
- Montreal, Quebec; Canada
- Frequency: 102.3 MHz (HD Radio)
- Branding: Radio Centre-Ville

Programming
- Format: Multilingual
- Subchannels: HD2: Multilingual "Tamazgha Radio"; HD3 and HD4: Silent

Ownership
- Owner: Radio Centre-Ville Saint-Louis

History
- First air date: January 1975
- Call sign meaning: Cinq (five), because it originally aired programmes in five languages

Technical information
- Power: 2.3 kW
- HAAT: 90 metres (300 ft)

Links
- Website: radiocentreville.com tamazgharadio.ca (HD2)

CINQ-FM is a multilingual Canadian radio station located in Montreal, Quebec.

It broadcasts on 102.3 MHz using a directional antenna with an average effective radiated power of 1,285 watts and a peak effective radiated power of 2,335 watts (class A). Its studios are located on Saint-Laurent Boulevard in Montreal.

The station operates under a community radio licence and offers varied programming in seven different languages whereas all programmes are produced and animated by volunteers. It identifies itself as "Radio Centre-Ville".

CINQ FM logo

CINQ-FM opened on 27 January 1975; at the time the station was on 99.3 MHz and used only 7.5 watts of power. Originally, the station aired programming in five different languages, hence the call sign ("cinq" being the French word for "five"). Those five languages were English, French, Spanish, Portuguese, and Greek. It has since added Arabic and Haitian Creole programming to its lineup.
