= Royal Center, Indiana =

Town of Royal Center
- Town
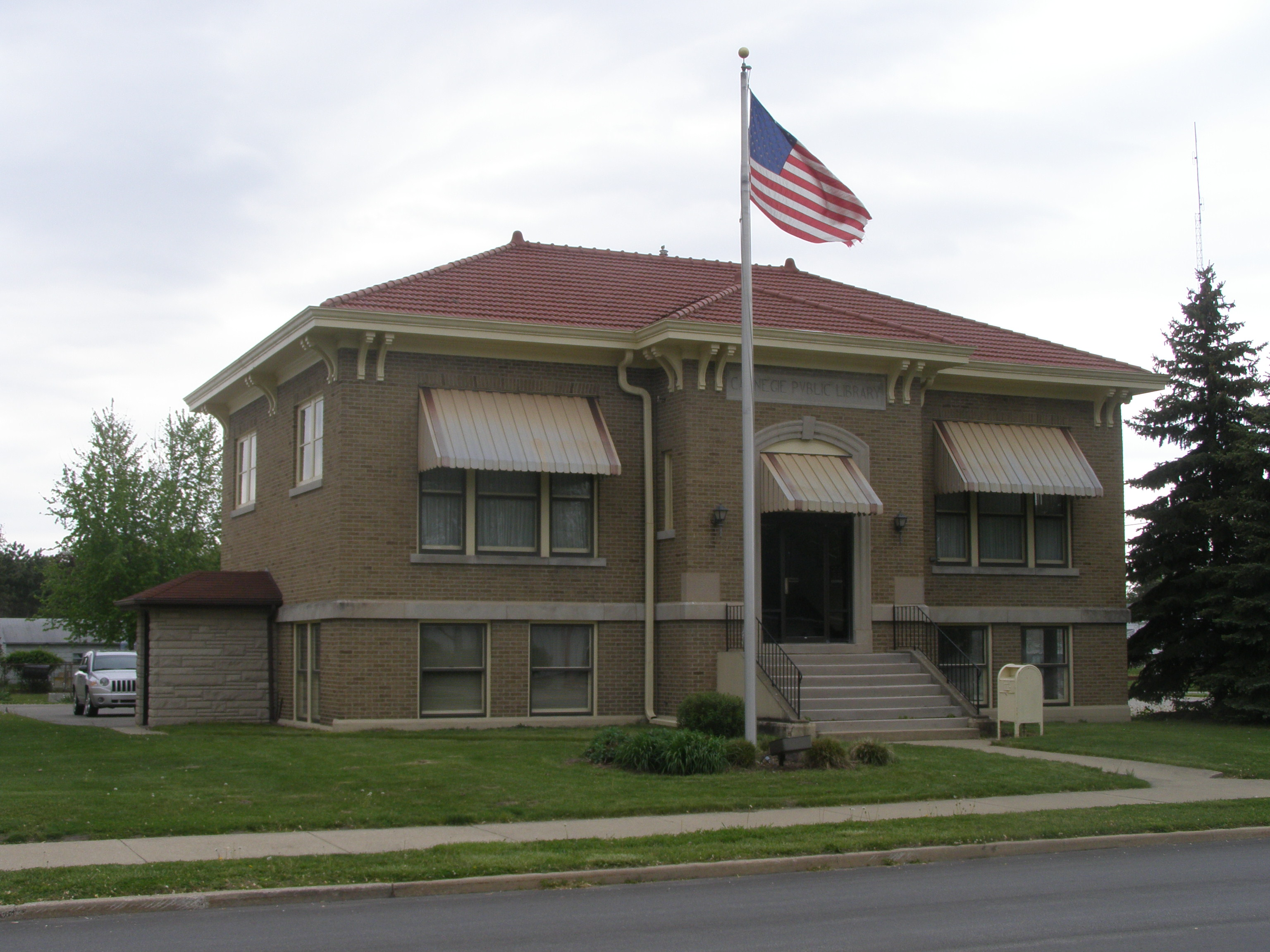
- Royal Center Carnegie Library, 203 North Chicago St.

- Location of Royal Center in Cass County, Indiana.
- Coordinates: 40°51′50″N 86°29′59″W
- Country: United States
- State: Indiana
- County: Cass
- Township: Boone

Area
  - Total: 0.57 sq mi (1.48 km^{2})
  - Land: 0.57 sq mi (1.48 km^{2})
  - Water: 0 sq mi (0.00 km^{2})
- Elevation: 735 ft (224 m)

Population (2020)
  - Total: 802
  - Density: 1,405.5/sq mi (542.67/km^{2})
- Time zone: UTC-5 (Eastern (EST))
  - Summer (DST): UTC-4 (EDT)
- ZIP code: 46978
- Area code: 574
- FIPS code: 18-66222
- GNIS feature ID: 2396892
- Website: www.in.gov/towns/royalcenter/

Royal Center is a town in Boone Township, Cass County, Indiana, United States. As of the 2020 census, Royal Center had a population of 802.

== History ==
Royal Center had its start in the year 1846 by the building of the Pittsburgh, Cincinnati, Chicago and St. Louis Railroad through that territory. It was supposedly named after a place in New York.

== Geography ==
According to the 2010 census, Royal Center has a total area of 0.6 square miles (1.55 km^{2}), all land. Royal Center is the fourth-largest town by population in Cass County, and the third-largest town by land area.

== Demographics ==
Historical population
| Census | Pop. | Note | %± |
|---|---|---|---|
| 1870 | 306 | | — |
| 1880 | 399 | | 30.4% |
| 1890 | 527 | | 32.1% |
| 1900 | 657 | | 24.7% |
| 1910 | 909 | | 38.4% |
| 1920 | 900 | | −1.0% |
| 1930 | 777 | | −13.7% |
| 1940 | 865 | | 11.3% |
| 1950 | 876 | | 1.3% |
| 1960 | 966 | | 10.3% |
| 1970 | 987 | | 2.2% |
| 1980 | 908 | | −8.0% |
| 1990 | 859 | | −5.4% |
| 2000 | 832 | | −3.1% |
| 2010 | 861 | | 3.5% |
| 2020 | 802 | | −6.9% |
U.S. Decennial Census

=== 2010 census ===
As of the census of 2010, there were 861 people, 342 households, and 234 families living in the town. The population density was 1,435.0 inhabitants per square mile (554.1/km^{2}). There were 374 housing units at an average density of 623.3 per square mile (240.7/km^{2}). The racial makeup of the town was 97.4% White, 0.8% African American, 0.3% Native American, 0.5% Asian, and 0.9% from two or more races. Hispanic or Latino of any race were 1.3% of the population.

There were 342 households, of which 37.4% had children under the age of 18 living with them, 50.0% were married couples living together, 13.2% had a female householder with no husband present, 5.3% had a male householder with no wife present, and 31.6% were non-families. 27.8% of all households were made up of individuals, and 12.5% had someone living alone who was 65 years of age or older. The average household size was 2.52 and the average family size was 3.06.

The median age in the town was 38 years. 27.3% of residents were under the age of 18; 8.3% were between the ages of 18 and 24; 25.1% were from 25 to 44; 24.1% were from 45 to 64; and 15.4% were 65 years of age or older. The gender makeup of the town was 49.9% male and 50.1% female.

=== 2000 census ===
As of the census of 2000, there were 832 people, 330 households, and 235 families living in the town. The population density was 1,660.5 inhabitants per square mile (641.1/km^{2}). There were 348 housing units at an average density of 694.5 per square mile (268.1/km^{2}). The racial makeup of the town was 99.04% White, 0.24% Native American, 0.24% from other races, and 0.48% from two or more races. Hispanic or Latino of any race were 0.36% of the population.

There were 330 households, out of which 31.5% had children under the age of 18 living with them, 56.4% were married couples living together, 10.6% had a female householder with no husband present, and 28.5% were non-families. 25.5% of all households were made up of individuals, and 15.5% had someone living alone who was 65 years of age or older. The average household size was 2.52 and the average family size was 3.01.

In the town, the population was spread out, with 26.7% under the age of 18, 7.9% from 18 to 24, 25.7% from 25 to 44, 19.4% from 45 to 64, and 20.3% who were 65 years of age or older. The median age was 39 years. For every 100 females, there were 93.0 males. For every 100 females age 18 and over, there were 91.2 males.

The median income for a household in the town was $40,625, and the median income for a family was $52,167. Males had a median income of $33,833 versus $19,792 for females. The per capita income for the town was $17,440. About 2.8% of families and 4.7% of the population were below the poverty line, including 7.1% of those under age 18 and 1.3% of those age 65 or over.

== Education ==
Education in Royal Center is currently centered on the Pioneer Regional School Corporation. A small school in an agricultural community, it has proven to be an academic leader and resource for the community.

The Pioneer Regional School Corporation consists of five townships, four of which are in Cass County-Boone, Harrison, Jefferson, and Noble-and one in White County-Cass township. The corporation has in it 153 square miles (400 km^{2}) and includes the communities of Lucerne, Headlee, Lake Cicott, and Royal Center. The only existing and occupied building eliminated during the reorganization process was the school at Lucerne, which was closed in 1966 when the Jr.-Sr. High School building was completed and occupied. The corporation also has one elementary building, which, along with Pioneer Junior-Senior High School, is located in Royal Center.

== Notable people ==
- George E. Dunn (1927–2020), Republican member of the South Dakota House of Representatives
- Jack Burley Kiser (born September 10, 2000), professional football player in the National Football League(NFL)
