= WLHM =

FM radio station in Indiana, U.S.

Coordinates: 40°45′16″N 86°18′40″W

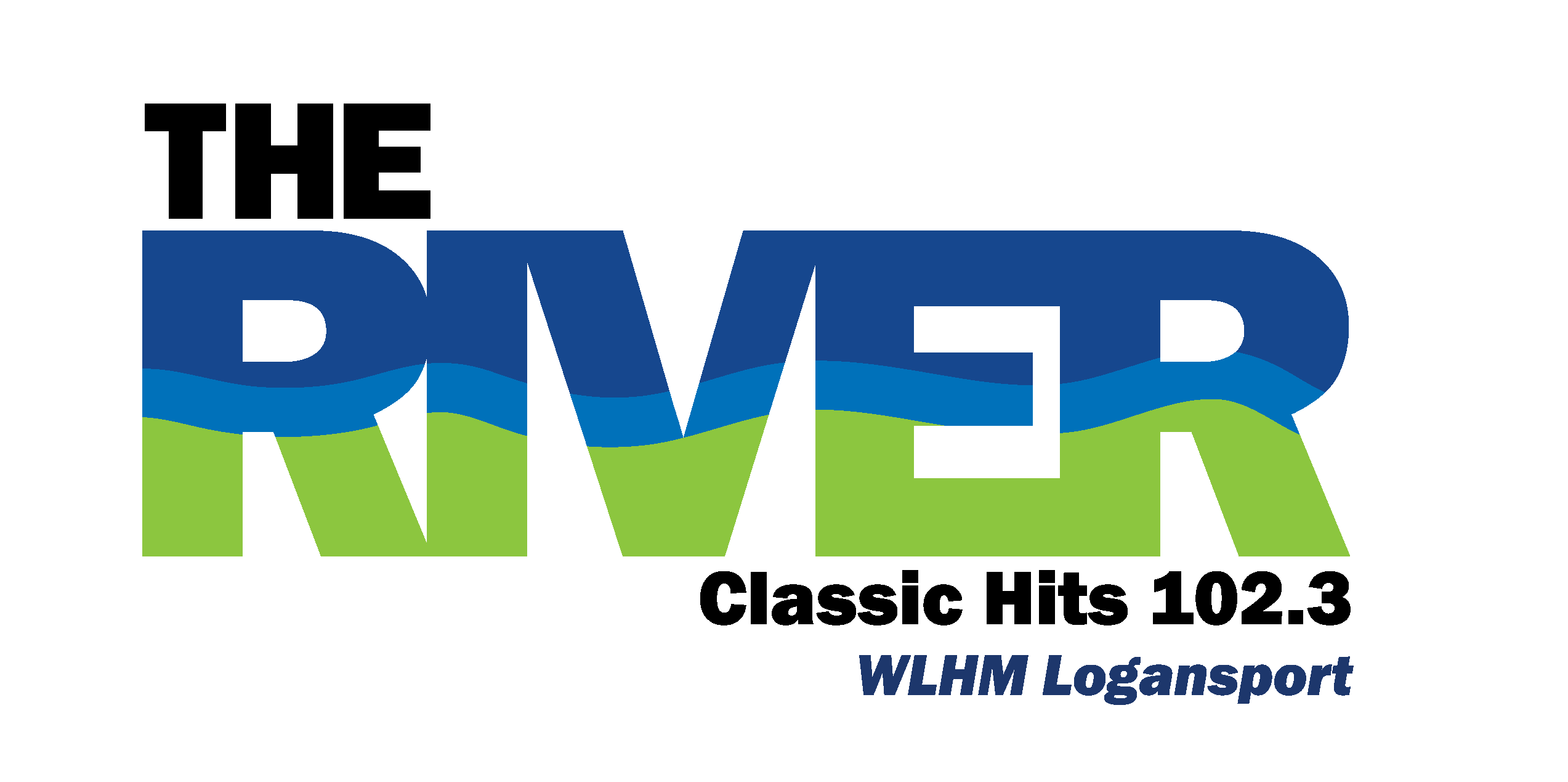
- Logansport, Indiana; United States
- Broadcast area: Logansport, Indiana; Peru, Indiana
- Frequency: 102.3 MHz
- Branding: The River

Programming
- Format: Classic hits

Ownership
- Owner: James Allan Schliemann; (Iron Horse Broadcasting, LLC)
- Sister stations: WSAL, WHZR

History
- First air date: 1965

Technical information
- Licensing authority: FCC
- Facility ID: 38276
- Class: A
- ERP: 3,000 watts
- HAAT: 91 meters (299 ft)

Links
- Public license information: Public file; LMS
- Website: www.indianasbestradio.com

WLHM (102.3 FM) is a radio station licensed to Logansport, Indiana, United States. The station airs a Classic hits format and is currently owned by James Allan Schliemann, through licensee Iron Horse Broadcasting, LLC.
