= WAMI-FM =

Radio station in Opp, Alabama

- Opp, Alabama; United States
- Frequency: 102.3 MHz
- Branding: Classic Country 102.3

Programming
- Format: Classic country

Ownership
- Owner: Covington Media LLC

History
- First air date: 1974

Technical information
- Licensing authority: FCC
- Facility ID: 66211
- Class: A
- ERP: 3,400 watts
- HAAT: 85 meters (279 ft)
- Transmitter coordinates: 31°18′54″N 86°15′45″W

Links
- Public license information: Public file; LMS

WAMI-FM (102.3 FM, "Classic Country 102.3") is a commercial radio station licensed to serve the community of Opp, Alabama, United States. The station is owned by Covington Media LLC.

== Programming ==
WAMI-FM broadcasts a classic country music format.
