= Pioneer Junior-Senior High School =

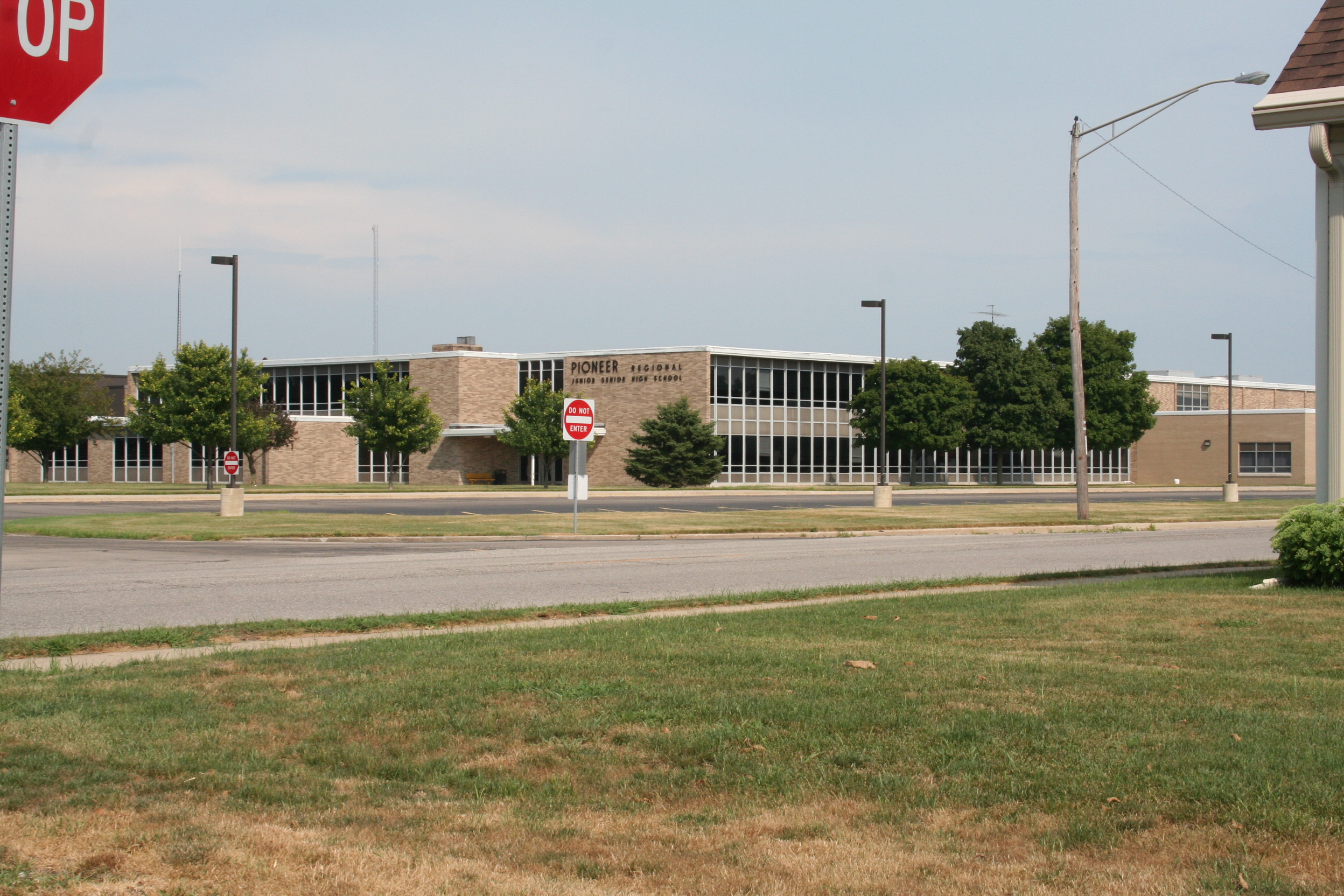

Location
- 317 N Chicago St, Royal Center, Indiana 46978
- Coordinates: 40°51′36″N 86°29′39″W

Information
- Type: Public
- School district: Pioneer Regional School Corporation
- Principal: Jeff Brooke
- Faculty: 31.50 (on an FTE basis)
- Grades: 7-12
- Enrollment: 432 (2023–2024)
- Student to teacher ratio: 13.71
- Color
- Athletics conference: Hoosier North Athletic Conference
- Nickname: Panthers
- Website: www.pioneer.k12.in.us

Pioneer Junior-Senior High School is a public high school in Royal Center, Indiana. It is part of the Pioneer Regional School District and offers grades 7 through 12. Pioneer has won 7 state championship titles in high school athletics. Pioneer was the first school, in the state of Indiana, to win three state championships in one school year. In the 2020–2021 school year, the girls of Pioneer won the state championships for Volleyball, Basketball, and Softball.

== Notable alumni ==
- Jack Kiser, linebacker for the Jacksonville Jaguars

== See also ==
- List of high schools in Indiana
- Hoosier North Athletic Conference
- Royal Center, Indiana
