= WKZR =

- Milledgeville, Georgia; United States
- Broadcast area: Milledgeville, Georgia
- Frequency: 102.3 MHz

Programming
- Format: Country music
- Affiliations: ABC Radio, Jones Radio Network, Motor Racing Network

Ownership
- Owner: Kristopher Kendrick; (Oconee Communications Company, LLC)

History
- Former call signs: WMVG-FM (1978–1981)

Technical information
- Licensing authority: FCC
- Facility ID: 73301
- Class: A
- ERP: 3,300 watts
- HAAT: 91.0 meters
- Transmitter coordinates: 33°4′58.00″N 83°15′1.00″W

Links
- Public license information: Public file; LMS

WKZR (102.3 FM) is a radio station broadcasting a country music format. Licensed to Milledgeville, Georgia, United States, the station is currently owned by Kristopher Kendrick, through licensee Oconee Communications Company, LLC, and features programming from ABC Radio, Jones Radio Network and Motor Racing Network.

== History ==
The station went on the air as WMVG-FM on 1978-10-04. On 1981-04-06, the station changed its call sign to the current WKZR.
