= KKBA =

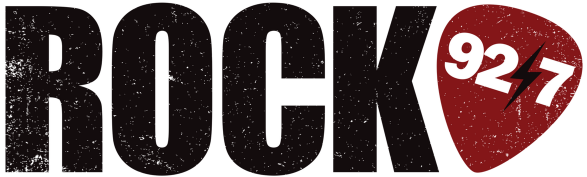
- Kingsville, Texas; United States
- Broadcast area: Corpus Christi, Texas; Alice, Texas; Kingsville, Texas
- Frequency: 92.7 MHz
- Branding: Rock 92.7

Programming
- Format: Active rock

Ownership
- Owner: Malkan Interactive Communications
- Sister stations: KEYS, KZFM

History
- First air date: November 1981
- Former call signs: KODK (1981–1990); KNGV (1990–1995)
- Call sign meaning: Station branded as "Bay"

Technical information
- Licensing authority: FCC
- Facility ID: 34918
- Class: C2
- ERP: 50,000 watts
- HAAT: 250.7 meters (823 ft)
- Transmitter coordinates: 27°39′33.0″N 97°34′12.0″W

Links
- Public license information: Public file; LMS
- Webcast: KKBA Webstream
- Website: KKBA Online

KKBA (92.7 FM) is an active rock formatted broadcast radio station licensed to Kingsville, Texas, serving Corpus Christi, Alice, and Kingsville in Texas. KKBA is locally owned and operated by Malkan Interactive Communications.

== History ==
in The 2000s to September 4,2015 it was a Rhythmic Adult Contemporary format under The Name 92.7 KBAY and it switched to a Active Rock as "Rock 92-7". Malkan added the San Antonio-based "Billy Madison Show" to mornings.
