= KCCP-LP =

- South Padre Island, Texas; United States
- Frequency: 102.3 MHz

Ownership
- Owner: Cameron County Texas

Technical information
- Licensing authority: FCC
- Facility ID: 135175
- Class: L1
- ERP: 40 watts
- HAAT: 24.0 meters (78.7 ft)
- Transmitter coordinates: 26°4′39″N 97°9′53″W

Links
- Public license information: LMS

KCCP-LP (102.3 FM) is a radio station licensed to South Padre Island, Texas, United States. The station is currently owned by Cameron County Texas.
