= WSKK =

Coordinates: 34°42′35″N 88°50′36″W

- Ripley, Mississippi; United States
- Broadcast area: Booneville, Mississippi; New Albany, Mississippi
- Frequency: 102.3 MHz
- Branding: The Shark

Programming
- Format: Classic hits/Classic rock

Ownership
- Owner: John and Melinda Marsalis; (JC Media LLC)

History
- First air date: June 1, 1979
- Former call signs: WTXI (1979–1993); WKZU (1993–2008)

Technical information
- Licensing authority: FCC
- Facility ID: 63297
- Class: A
- ERP: 3,500 watts
- HAAT: 132 meters (433 ft)

Links
- Public license information: Public file; LMS
- Website: shark1023.com

WSKK (102.3 FM) is a radio station licensed to Ripley, Mississippi. The station broadcasts a classic hits/classic rock format and is owned by John and Melinda Marsalis, through licensee JC Media LLC.

Former logo and format
