= WDXC =

Radio station in Pound, Virginia

- Pound, Virginia; United States
- Broadcast area: Clintwood, Virginia; Norton, Virginia; Wise, Virginia; Jenkins, Kentucky; Whitesburg, Kentucky
- Frequency: 102.3 MHz
- Branding: 102.3 Kickin' Country

Programming
- Format: Country
- Affiliations: Fox News Radio; WJHL-TV

Ownership
- Owner: WDXC Radio, Inc.

History
- First air date: 1979
- Former call signs: WWLH (1979–1985)

Technical information
- Licensing authority: FCC
- Facility ID: 71361
- Class: A
- ERP: 350 watts
- HAAT: 401 meters (1,316 ft)
- Transmitter coordinates: 37°9′7.0″N 82°38′41.0″W

Links
- Public license information: Public file; LMS
- Webcast: Listen live
- Website: wdxcradio.com

WDXC is a Country-formatted broadcast radio station licensed to Pound, Virginia, serving Clintwood, Norton, and Wise in Virginia and Jenkins and Whitesburg in Kentucky. WDXC is owned and operated by WDXC Radio, Inc.
