= KQEW =

Coordinates: 33°48′10″N 92°26′10″W

- Fordyce, Arkansas; United States
- Frequency: 102.3 MHz

Programming
- Format: Talk radio

Ownership
- Owner: Dallas Properties, Inc.

Technical information
- Licensing authority: FCC
- Facility ID: 15310
- Class: C3
- ERP: 25,000 watts
- HAAT: 100 meters (330 ft)

Links
- Public license information: Public file; LMS
- Webcast: Listen live
- Website: kbjtkq.com

KQEW (102.3 FM) is a radio station licensed to Fordyce, Arkansas. The station broadcasts a talk format and is owned by Dallas Properties, Inc.
