= WKJT =

Coordinates: 39°08′30″N 88°33′36″W

- Teutopolis, Illinois; United States
- Broadcast area: Effingham, Illinois
- Frequency: 102.3 MHz
- Branding: KJ Country 102.3

Programming
- Format: Country music
- Affiliations: Fox News Radio

Ownership
- Owner: Gayla Jo Ring; (Premier Broadcasting Inc.)

Technical information
- Licensing authority: FCC
- Facility ID: 31833
- Class: A
- ERP: 6,000 watts
- HAAT: 100 meters (330 ft)

Links
- Public license information: Public file; LMS
- Webcast: Listen live
- Website: kjcountry.com

WKJT (102.3 FM) is a radio station broadcasting a country music format, licensed to Teutopolis, Illinois and serving the Effingham, Illinois, area. WKJT is owned by Gayla Jo Ring, through licensee Premier Broadcasting Inc.

Previous logo
