= WVRQ (AM) =

- Viroqua, Wisconsin; United States
- Broadcast area: Viroqua, Wisconsin
- Frequency: 1360 kHz
- Branding: The Vintage AM

Programming
- Format: Oldies
- Affiliations: Westwood One

Ownership
- Owner: Robinson Corporation
- Sister stations: WVRQ-FM

History
- First air date: 1958
- Former call signs: WISV (1958–1986)
- Call sign meaning: Viroqua

Technical information
- Licensing authority: FCC
- Facility ID: 57257
- Class: D
- Power: 1,000 watts (day); 23 watts (night)
- Transmitter coordinates: 43°32′4.00″N 90°52′23.00″W
- Translator: 107.3 W297BW (Viroqua)

Links
- Public license information: Public file; LMS

WVRQ (1360 AM) is a radio station broadcasting an oldies format. Licensed to Viroqua, Wisconsin, United States, the station serves the La Crosse area. The station is currently owned by Robinson Corporation and features programming from Westwood One. Its original call letters were WISV.
