= Burnettsville, Indiana =

- Town
- Location of Burnettsville in White County, Indiana.
- Coordinates: 40°45′40″N 86°35′41″W
- Country: United States
- State: Indiana
- County: White
- Township: Jackson
- Established: 1854
- Named for: Burnetts Stream

Area
  - Total: 0.75 sq mi (1.93 km^{2})
  - Land: 0.75 sq mi (1.93 km^{2})
  - Water: 0 sq mi (0.00 km^{2})
- Elevation: 709 ft (216 m)

Population (2020)
  - Total: 390
  - Density: 523.1/sq mi (201.96/km^{2})
- Time zone: UTC-5 (EST)
  - Summer (DST): UTC-5 (EST)
- ZIP code: 47926
- Area code: 574
- FIPS code: 18-09316
- GNIS feature ID: 2396620

Burnettsville (/ˈbɜːrnətsˌvɪl/ BUR-nuhts-vil) is a town in Jackson Township, White County, in the U.S. state of Indiana. The population was 390 at the 2020 census.

== History ==
Burnettsville was laid out in 1854, and was named after the nearby Burnetts Stream. Around 1864, Burnettsville merged with the nearby town of Sharon.

A post office was first established in the community under the name Burnett's Creek, which ran from 1837 to 1922.

== Geography ==
According to the 2010 census, Burnettsville has a total area of 0.75 square miles (1.94 km^{2}), all land.

== Demographics ==
Historical population
Census	Pop.	Note	%±
1860	222		—
1870	270		21.6%
1880	296		9.6%
1890	479		61.8%
1900	497		3.8%
1910	489		−1.6%
1920	517		5.7%
1930	402		−22.2%
1940	436		8.5%
1950	457		4.8%
1960	452		−1.1%
1970	510		12.8%
1980	496		−2.7%
1990	401		−19.2%
2000	373		−7.0%
2010	346		−7.2%
2020	390		12.7%
U.S. Decennial Census

=== 2010 census ===
As of the census of 2010, there were 346 people, 153 households, and 101 families living in the town. The population density was 461.3 inhabitants per square mile (178.1/km^{2}). There were 170 housing units at an average density of 226.7 per square mile (87.5/km^{2}). The racial makeup of the town was 98.3% White, 0.3% African American, 0.3% Asian, and 1.2% from two or more races.

There were 153 households, of which 24.2% had children under the age of 18 living with them, 52.3% were married couples living together, 9.8% had a female householder with no husband present, 3.9% had a male householder with no wife present, and 34.0% were non-families. 29.4% of all households were made up of individuals, and 15.1% had someone living alone who was 65 years of age or older. The average household size was 2.26 and the average family size was 2.77.

The median age in the town was 42.8 years. 21.4% of residents were under the age of 18; 6.9% were between the ages of 18 and 24; 24.3% were from 25 to 44; 30.3% were from 45 to 64; and 17.1% were 65 years of age or older. The gender makeup of the town was 46.5% male and 53.5% female.

=== 2000 census ===
As of the census of 2000, there were 373 people, 155 households, and 113 families living in the town. The population density was 504.6 inhabitants per square mile (194.8/km^{2}). There were 160 housing units at an average density of 216.5 per square mile (83.6/km^{2}). The racial makeup of the town was 98.93% White, and 1.07% from two or more races. Hispanic or Latino of any race were 0.80% of the population.

There were 155 households, out of which 30.3% had children under the age of 18 living with them, 60.6% were married couples living together, 9.0% had a female householder with no husband present, and 26.5% were non-families. 23.2% of all households were made up of individuals, and 10.3% had someone living alone who was 65 years of age or older. The average household size was 2.41 and the average family size was 2.80.

In the town, the population was spread out, with 22.5% under the age of 18, 7.5% from 18 to 24, 27.1% from 25 to 44, 27.1% from 45 to 64, and 15.8% who were 65 years of age or older. The median age was 41 years. For every 100 females, there were 98.4 males. For every 100 females age 18 and over, there were 90.1 males.

The median income for a household in the town was $36,563, and the median income for a family was $45,625. Males had a median income of $30,982 versus $21,667 for females. The per capita income for the town was $22,005. About 6.6% of families and 9.0% of the population were below the poverty line, including 15.7% of those under age 18 and 11.5% of those age 65 or over.

== Annual events ==
Each year Burnettsville holds its Community Day in September. The day's events include the Fireman's Breakfast, garage sales, 5K-10k Bee Bumble race, 1k-Bee Stingers race (for the kids) Ron's famous Ham and Beans, Cake Walk, over 60 vendors, entertainment on the stage all day, kids games, bounce house, balloons, parade, and fish fry. This and other events are held in the maintained old Burnettsville High School Gym, locally known as the "Bee Hive", the teams being known as the Burnettsville "Bees", before the consolidation of the White County Schools in 1962.
