= Leases Corner, Indiana =

Unincorporated community in Indiana, U.S.

Coordinates: 40°51′59″N 86°22′27″W

Leases Corner is an unincorporated community in Cass County, Indiana, in the United States.

== History ==
Leases Corner once contained a post office called Fitch. The Fitch post office was established in 1851, and was discontinued in 1863.
