= WBSC-LP =

- Bamberg, South Carolina; United States
- Frequency: 102.3 MHz
- Branding: 102.3 WBSC

Programming
- Format: Oldies

Ownership
- Owner: Rising High Foundation

History
- First air date: 2014

Technical information
- Licensing authority: FCC
- Facility ID: 195457
- Class: L1
- ERP: 100 watts
- HAAT: 26 metres (85 ft)
- Transmitter coordinates: 33°17′48″N 81°02′8″W

Links
- Public license information: LMS
- Webcast: Listen Live
- Website: wbscradio.org

WBSC-LP (102.3 FM) is a radio station licensed to serve the community of Bamberg, South Carolina. The station is owned by Rising High Foundation. It airs an oldies music format.

The station was assigned the WBSC-LP call letters by the Federal Communications Commission on April 23, 2014.
