= KSAQ =

Coordinates: 28°45′41″N 98°41′57″W

- Charlotte, Texas; United States
- Frequency: 102.3 MHz

Programming
- Format: Country music

Ownership
- Owner: Creative RF Venture Group LLC

Technical information
- Licensing authority: FCC
- Facility ID: 165969
- Class: A
- ERP: 4,400 watts
- HAAT: 117 meters (384 ft)

Links
- Public license information: Public file; LMS
- Website: KSAQ on Facebook

KSAQ (102.3 FM) is a radio station licensed to Charlotte, Texas. The station broadcasts a country music format and is owned by Creative RF Venture Group LLC.
