= KBLO =

- Corcoran, California; United States
- Broadcast area: Visalia-Tulare-Hanford area
- Frequency: 102.3 MHz

Programming
- Language: Spanish
- Format: Christian radio

Ownership
- Owner: Centro Cristiano Amistad Church

History
- First air date: November 17, 1999
- Former call signs: KLCZ (1987–2001); KXQX (2001–2005)

Technical information
- Licensing authority: FCC
- Facility ID: 54541
- Class: B1
- ERP: 19,500 watts
- HAAT: 116 meters (381 ft)
- Transmitter coordinates: 36°11′4″N 119°24′1″W

Links
- Public license information: Public file; LMS

KBLO (102.3 FM) is a commercial radio station licensed to Corcoran, California, United States, and serving the Visalia-Tulare-Hanford area of Central California. Owned by Centro Cristiano Amistad Church, it broadcasts a Spanish-language Christian format.

The station's transmitter and tower are located off RD 76 and West Paige Avenue, about 3 miles (4.8 km) west of the city of Tulare, California.

== History ==
The station was granted a construction permit by the Federal Communications Commission on June 24, 1987. It was a Class A station with the call sign KLCZ designated on June 30, 1987. Multiple construction permit extensions and an upgrade to class "B1" were applied for over the next ten years.

KLCZ finally signed on the air on November 17, 1999. On November 19, 2001, the call sign was changed to KXQX.

The KBLO call sign was assigned on June 1, 2005. The LO in the call letters represent the moniker "Radio Lobo" or Wolf Radio. It was originally a simulcast of KLOQ-FM 98.7 in Winton, California. KLOQ-FM is owned by Mapleton Communicatons, which had purchased 102.3 in April 2005 from Rak Communications, Inc. The studios of both stations were in Merced. The stations carried a Regional Mexican format.

KBLO was sold in October 2010 to CCA License Holdings LLC and the format was changed to Spanish-language Christian radio.

On January 24, 2023, KBLO's license was transferred to Centro Cristiano Amistad Church, the 100% owner of CCA License Holdings. The Spanish Christian programming continued as before.
