= KVLE-FM =

- Gunnison, Colorado; United States
- Frequency: 102.3 MHz
- Branding: Valley 102.3

Programming
- Format: Adult contemporary
- Affiliations: Westwood One

Ownership
- Owner: John Harvey Rees; (Bobcat Radio, Inc.)

History
- First air date: 1980

Technical information
- Licensing authority: FCC
- Facility ID: 27158
- Class: A
- ERP: 6,000 watts
- HAAT: −140 meters (−460 ft)
- Transmitter coordinates: 38°33′53″N 106°55′38″W

Links
- Public license information: Public file; LMS

KVLE-FM (102.3 FM, "Valley 102.3") is a radio station broadcasting an adult contemporary music format. Licensed to Gunnison, Colorado, United States, the station is currently owned by John Harvey Rees through licensee Bobcat Radio, Inc., and features programming from Citadel Broadcasting.
