= KVUW =

Radio station in West Wendover, Nevada

- West Wendover, Nevada; United States
- Broadcast area: Elko, Nevada
- Frequency: 102.3 MHz
- Branding: ROCK 102

Programming
- Format: Classic rock

Ownership
- Owner: Mountain States Radio Inc.

History
- First air date: 2001

Technical information
- Licensing authority: FCC
- Facility ID: 84328
- Class: C
- ERP: 100,000 watts
- HAAT: 588 metres (1,929 ft)
- Transmitter coordinates: 41°07′19″N 114°34′05″W

Links
- Public license information: Public file; LMS

KVUW (102.3 FM, ROCK 102") is a radio station licensed to serve West Wendover, Nevada. The station is owned by Alexander Ortega. It airs an classic rock music format.

The station was assigned the KVUW call letters by the FCC on August 14, 2001.

== Ownership ==
In April 2005, Mountain States Radio Inc. (Victor A. Michael, president) acquired KVUW as part of a two-station deal from Mt Rushmore Broadcasting Inc. (Jan C. Gray, president) for a reported sale price of $750,000.

== Construction permit ==
On December 12, 2011 the station was granted a construction permit by the FCC to increase its effective radiated power to 100,000 watts and raise its antenna to a height above average terrain of 588 metres (1,929 ft). The transmitter moved to Rocky Point, a peak just east of Wells, Nevada.
