= XHTSC-FM =

College radio station in Cananea, Sonora

- Cananea, Sonora, Mexico; Mexico
- Frequency: 102.3 MHz
- Branding: Radio Tecnológico

Programming
- Format: Mexican college

Ownership
- Owner: Instituto Tecnológico Superior de Cananea

History
- First air date: November 20, 2012
- Call sign meaning: Instituto Tecnológico Superior de Cananea

Technical information
- ERP: 3 kW

XHTSC-FM is a Mexican college radio station owned by the Instituto Tecnológico Superior de Cananea in the state of Sonora. The station broadcasts on 102.3 MHz and is known as Radio Tecnológico.

== History ==
XHTSC received its permit in 2012 after more than 10 years of the university attempting to get a radio station.
