= Headlee, Indiana =

- Unincorporated community
- Location within Indiana Location within the United States
- Coordinates: 40°53′52″N 86°39′31″W
- Country: United States
- State: Indiana
- County: White
- Township: Cass
- Elevation: 696 ft (212 m)
- Time zone: UTC-5 (Eastern (EST))
  - Summer (DST): UTC-4 (EDT)
- ZIP code: 47960
- FIPS code: 18-32746
- GNIS feature ID: 435944

Headlee is an unincorporated community in Cass Township, White County, Indiana. It is also part of the Cass Township of Indiana.

== History ==
A post office was established at Headlee in 1877, and remained in operation until 1907. The Headlee family were among the first settlers in the area.

== Geography ==
Headlee is located on Indiana State Road 119, and is a short distance away from Lake Shafer in Buffalo and Monticello.
