= WQTU =

Radio station in Rome, Georgia

Coordinates: 34.234°N 85.231°W

- Rome, Georgia; United States
- Frequency: 102.3 MHz
- Branding: Q102

Programming
- Format: Adult contemporary
- Affiliations: Westwood One

Ownership
- Owner: Rome Radio Partners

History
- First air date: May 1, 1966
- Former call signs: WRGA-FM (1966–1977)

Technical information
- Licensing authority: FCC
- Facility ID: 40816
- Class: A
- ERP: 1,100 watts
- HAAT: 227 meters (745 ft)

Links
- Public license information: Public file; LMS
- Webcast: Listen Live
- Website: q1023.fm

WQTU (102.3 FM, "Q102") is a radio station located in Rome, Georgia.

== History ==
The radio station 102.3 FM began broadcasting on May 1, 1966, as WRGA-FM, the sister FM station to WRGA (AM 1470). It was the second time an FM counterpart had been built for WRGA; a prior WRGA-FM had operated at 106.5 MHz from 1950 until being deleted on January 17, 1955. WRGA-FM initially carried a 60 percent simulcast of the AM station.

In 1977, WRGA-AM-FM was sold from Mather Payne to Mike McDougald for $750,000; McDougald immediately announced his plans to change the FM station's call letters to WQTU and program it independently, with the station adopting its present adult contemporary format. While McDougald had reached a deal to sell the stations to the newly formed Radioactivity Broadcast Group in 1988, the company—in the midst of a $10 million buying spree—fell apart after Radioactivity owner Clyde Murchison was arrested that October in an FBI sting operation; the company's partners noticed discrepancies in his background, while he claimed to be a nephew of Clint Murchison but was not recognized by a family friend. While Radioactivity was given until the end of 1988 by the equity broker in the Rome transaction to find a replacement equity partner, this did not come to pass. McDougald was named the chairman of the Hospital Authority of Floyd County in 1992; as part of a special grand jury investigation into conflicts of interest at the hospital authority, it was found that his stations received more than 80 percent of the agency's radio advertising budget even though competitors WTSH and WKCX were higher-rated.

McDougald would own the pair for 25 years, selling the stations in 2002 to Paul Stone's Southern Broadcasting Companies in a $1.6 million transaction. Stone sold the stations and other Rome radio assets in 2009 to Rome Radio Partners, with WRGA-WQTU going for $2.65 million.
