= KKPN =

Contemporary hit radio station in Corpus Christi, Texas

Coordinates: 27.868°N 97.219°W

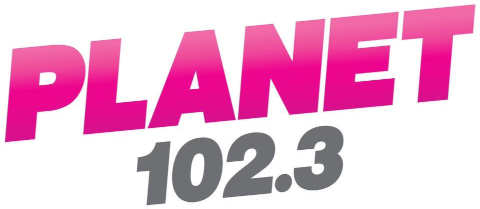
- Rockport, Texas; United States
- Broadcast area: Corpus Christi metropolitan area
- Frequency: 102.3 MHz
- Branding: Planet 102.3

Programming
- Language: English
- Format: Contemporary hit radio
- Affiliations: Premiere Networks; United Stations Radio Networks; Westwood One

Ownership
- Owner: John Bushman; (ICA Radio, Ltd.)
- Sister stations: KAJE; KPUS

History
- First air date: October 28, 1985
- Former call signs: KPCB (1985–1993); KXCC (1993–1998); KZJM (1998); KBTE (1998–2001)
- Call sign meaning: "Planet"

Technical information
- Licensing authority: FCC
- Facility ID: 12151
- Class: C2
- ERP: 50,000 watts
- HAAT: 136 meters (446 ft)

Links
- Public license information: Public file; LMS
- Webcast: Listen live
- Website: www.theplanet1023.com

KKPN (102.3 FM), known as "Planet 102.3", is a contemporary hit radio station serving the Corpus Christi Metropolitan Area in the state of Texas. The station's musical format includes a balance of hip hop, rock music, and pop music in rotation. Its studios are located along South Padre Island Drive in Corpus Christi, and the transmitter is in Ingleside, Texas.

Planet 102.3 also airs The Kidd Kraddick Morning Show from iHeartMedia's 106.1 KHKS in Dallas, Texas.
