= WBTO (AM) =

Linton, Indiana; United States
- Frequency: 1600 kHz

Ownership
- Owner: The Original Company, Inc

History
- First air date: November 1953

Technical information
- Facility ID: 37736
- Class: D
- Power: 500 watts day 32 watts night
- Transmitter coordinates: 39°3′57.00″N 87°11′19.00″W

WBTO (1600 AM) was a radio station licensed to Linton, Indiana, United States. According to FCC records, WBTO was first licensed in November 1953, and its license was cancelled at the request of the licensee in March 2011. The station was owned by The Original Company, Inc.
