= DYCT-FM =

Radio station in the Philippines

DYCT
- Tacloban; Philippines
- Broadcast area: Eastern Visayas
- Frequency: 102.3 MHz

Programming
- Format: Silent

Ownership
- Owner: Philippine Broadcasting Service

History
- First air date: November 2013
- Last air date: 2016
- Former names: Radyo ng Bayan
- Former frequencies: 104.3 MHz (November 2013 - January 2015)
- Call sign meaning: City of Tacloban

Technical information
- Licensing authority: NTC

DYCT (102.3 FM) was a radio station owned and operated by the Philippine Broadcasting Service.

== Profile ==
The station began broadcasting in November 2013 as Radyo ng Bayan, following the aftermath of Typhoon Haiyan (Yolanda). During its existence, it was located inside the Leyte Provincial Sports Complex. It went off the air sometime in 2016.

It is currently under the Department of Agriculture as an affiliate station. However, plans of reviving the station is put on hold due to stalled procurement process in the department.
