= WBTO-FM =

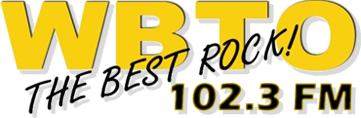
- Petersburg, Indiana; United States
- Frequency: 102.3 MHz

Programming
- Format: Classic rock

Ownership
- Owner: The Original Company, Inc.

History
- Former call signs: WFOV (1984–1984); WFPC (1984–2001)

Technical information
- Licensing authority: FCC
- Facility ID: 52567
- Class: A
- ERP: 3,000 watts
- HAAT: 98 meters
- Transmitter coordinates: 38°30′33.00″N 87°17′28.00″W

Links
- Public license information: Public file; LMS
- Website: wbtofm.com

WBTO-FM (102.3 FM) is a radio station licensed to Petersburg, Indiana, United States. The station is currently owned by The Original Company, Inc.

== History ==
The station went on the air as WFOV on June 11, 1984. On July 7, 1984, the station changed its call sign to WFPC. On January 25, 2001, its call sign was changed to the current WBTO.
