= KEDU-LP =

- Ruidoso, New Mexico; United States
- Frequency: 102.3 MHz
- Branding: Big Oldies 102.3 FM - Radio Ruidoso

Programming
- Format: Full-service and oldies
- Affiliations: Salem Radio Network; Moody Radio; SRN News

Ownership
- Owner: Christian Business Owners of Lincoln County

History
- First air date: October 3, 2003

Technical information
- Licensing authority: FCC
- Facility ID: 134657
- Class: L1
- ERP: 64 watts
- HAAT: 38 meters (125 ft)
- Transmitter coordinates: 33°23′10″N 105°40′18″W

Links
- Public license information: LMS
- Webcast: Listen live
- Website: KEDU-LP on Facebook

KEDU-LP (102.3 FM) is a radio station licensed to Ruidoso, New Mexico, United States, broadcasting a format consisting of Oldies, Talk programming from Salem Radio Network, local talk programs, Congressional Review Radio, ESGR Radio - New Mexico (Employer Support of the Guard and Reserve), as well as news updates from SRN News. The station is owned by Christian Business Owners of Lincoln County. President/GM Harv Twite built the station in 2003. It was the first LPFM (Low Power) station to sign-on in New Mexico.
