= WVRQ-FM =

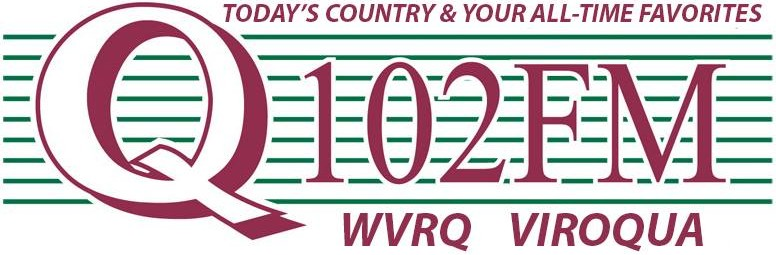
- Viroqua, Wisconsin; United States
- Broadcast area: Viroqua, Wisconsin/La Crosse, Wisconsin
- Frequency: 102.3 MHz
- Branding: Q102 FM All Hit Country

Programming
- Format: Country music
- Affiliations: Westwood One

Ownership
- Owner: Robinson Corporation
- Sister stations: WVRQ (AM)

History
- First air date: 1967
- Former call signs: WGBM (1967–1986)
- Call sign meaning: Viroqua

Technical information
- Licensing authority: FCC
- Facility ID: 57256
- Class: A
- ERP: 3,300 watts
- HAAT: 91.0 meters (298.6 ft)
- Transmitter coordinates: 43°31′27.00″N 90°51′51.00″W

Links
- Public license information: Public file; LMS

WVRQ-FM (102.3 FM) is a radio station broadcasting a country music format. Licensed to Viroqua, Wisconsin, United States, the station serves the greater La Crosse area. The station is currently owned by Robinson Corporation and features programming from Westwood One. The station's former call letters were WGBM.
