= National Register of Historic Places listings in Cass County, Indiana =

Location of Cass County in Indiana

This is a list of the National Register of Historic Places listings in Cass County, Indiana.

This is intended to be a complete list of the properties and districts on the National Register of Historic Places in Cass County, Indiana, United States. Latitude and longitude coordinates are provided for many National Register properties and districts; these locations may be seen together in a map.

There are 16 properties and districts listed on the National Register in the county, including one National Historic Landmark. Another property was once listed but has been removed.

Properties and districts located in incorporated areas display the name of the municipality, while properties and districts in unincorporated areas display the name of their civil township. Properties and districts split between multiple jurisdictions display the names of all jurisdictions.

This National Park Service list is complete through NPS recent listings posted May 1, 2026.

== Current listings ==
	Name on the Register	Image	Date listed	Location	City or town	Description
1	Josephus Atkinson Farm	Josephus Atkinson Farm	June 24, 2010 (#10000373)	4474 W. 400S, west of Clymers; 40°42′24″N 86°27′29″W	Clinton Township	
2	Bankers Row Historic District	Bankers Row Historic District	September 17, 1999 (#99001149)	Eel River Ave. from Market to 3rd 40°45′13″N 86°22′09″W	Logansport	
3	Thompson Barnett House	Thompson Barnett House	August 14, 1986 (#86001620)	State Road 25, north of Logansport; 40°47′02″N 86°21′02″W	Clay Township	
4	Courthouse Historic District	Courthouse Historic District	March 12, 1999 (#99000294)	Roughly between 3rd and 6th Sts., E. Melbourne Ave., and High St. 40°45′14″N 86°21′53″W	Logansport	
5	Ferguson House	Ferguson House	June 30, 1983 (#83000117)	803 E. Broadway; 40°45′17″N 86°21′35″W	Logansport	
6	Jerolaman-Long House	Jerolaman-Long House	March 28, 1985 (#85000651)	1004 E. Market St. 40°45′17″N 86°21′24″W	Logansport	
7	John Keip House	John Keip House	December 6, 2004 (#04001307)	2500 E. Broadway Ave. 40°45′34″N 86°20′10″W	Logansport	
8	Kendrick-Baldwin House	Kendrick-Baldwin House	September 9, 1982 (#82000060)	706 E. Market St. 40°45′14″N 86°21′39″W	Logansport	
9	Pipe Creek Falls Resort	Pipe Creek Falls Resort	September 14, 1995 (#95001105)	Junction of County Roads 850E and 275S at Pipe Creek, north of Walton; 40°43′36″N 86°13′00″W	Tipton Township	
10	Willard B. Place House	Willard B. Place House	August 14, 1998 (#98001050)	900 E. Broadway; 40°45′20″N 86°21′31″W	Logansport	
11	Pleasant Hill Church	Pleasant Hill Church	January 11, 1996 (#95001539)	Junction of County Roads 400S and 675W, southwest of Logansport; 40°42′44″N 86°30′06″W	Clinton Township	
12	Point Historic District	Point Historic District	September 17, 1999 (#99001150)	Roughly between Eel River Ave., 3rd, St., and E. Melbourne Ave. 40°45′09″N 86°22′07″W	Logansport	
13	Pollard-Nelson House	Pollard-Nelson House	October 29, 1975 (#75000042)	7th and Market Sts. 40°45′12″N 86°21′41″W	Logansport	
14	Riverside Historic District		November 16, 2022 (#100008409)	Roughly bounded by Erie Ave., High, and Market Sts. 40°45′26″N 86°21′14″W	Logansport	
15	Spencer Park Dentzel Carousel	Spencer Park Dentzel Carousel	February 27, 1987 (#87000838)	Riverside Park; 40°45′34″N 86°21′20″W	Logansport	
16	Henry Tousley House	Henry Tousley House	October 15, 2002 (#02001167)	1912 High St. 40°45′37″N 86°20′42″W	Logansport	

== Former listing ==
	Name on the Register	Image	Date listed	Date removed	Location	City or town	Description
1	Washington School		March 2, 1981 (#81000027)	February 1, 1985	101 N. Cicott St. 40°44′55″N 86°22′40″W	Logansport	

== See also ==
- List of National Historic Landmarks in Indiana
- National Register of Historic Places listings in Indiana
- Listings in neighboring counties: Carroll, Fulton, Howard, Miami, Pulaski, White
- List of Indiana state historical markers in Cass County
