= Ferguson House =

Ferguson House may refer to:

in the United States

(by state, then city/town)

- Ferguson House (Augusta, Arkansas), listed on the National Register of Historic Places (NRHP) in Woodruff County, Arkansas
- Ferguson-Calderara House, Fort Smith, AR, listed on the NRHP in Sebastian County, Arkansas
- T.M. Ferguson House, Marshall, AR, listed on the NRHP in Searcy County, Arkansas
- Zeb Ferguson House, Marshall, AR, listed on the NRHP in Searcy County, Arkansas
- Ferguson House (Pine Bluff, Arkansas), listed on the NRHP in Jefferson County, Arkansas
- Robert Ferguson House, Newark, DE, listed on the NRHP in New Castle County, Delaware
- Robert W. Ferguson House, Emathla, FL, listed on the NRHP in Marion County, Florida
- Benjamin Ferguson House, Charlestown, IN, listed on the NRHP in Clark County, Indiana
- Ferguson House (Logansport, Indiana), listed on the NRHP in Cass County, Indiana
- G.R. Ferguson, Sr. House, Leesville, LA, listed on the NRHP in Vernon Parish, Louisiana
- Charles W. Ferguson House, Webster Groves, MO, listed on the NRHP in St. Louis County, Missouri
- Ferguson House (Kalispell, Montana), listed on the NRHP in Flathead County, Montana
- William H. Ferguson House, Lincoln, NE, listed on the NRHP in Lancaster County, Nebraska
- John W. Ferguson House, Paterson, NJ, listed on the NRHP in Passaic County, New Jersey
- Dr. James Ferguson Office, Glens Falls, NY, listed on the NRHP in Warren County, New York
- Andrew Ferguson House, West Lafayette, OH, listed on the NRHP in Coshocton County, Ohio
- Ferguson House (Cache, Oklahoma), listed on the NRHP in Comanche County, Oklahoma
- Thompson Benton Ferguson House, Watonga, OK, listed on the NRHP in Blaine County, Oklahoma
- Albert W. Ferguson House, Astoria, OR, listed on the NRHP in Clatsop County, Oregon
- William Ferguson Farm, Glen Moore, PA, listed on the NRHP in Chester County, Pennsylvania
- James A. Ferguson House, Belton, TX, listed on the NRHP in Bell County, Texas
- James E. and Miriam Ferguson House, Belton, TX, listed on the NRHP in Bell County, Texas
- John H. Ferguson House, McKinney, TX, listed on the NRHP in Collin County, Texas
- Ferguson House (Temple, Texas), listed on the NRHP in Bell County, Texas
- Florence Ferguson House, Colfax, WA, listed on the NRHP in Whitman County, Washington
