= Isaac Wheeler Geer =

American businessman

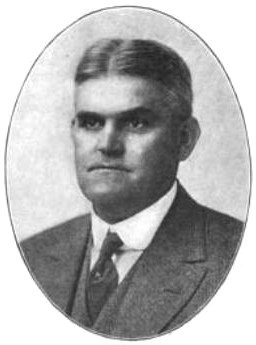
- Born: February 1, 1873; Plainfield, Connecticut
- Died: June 20, 1953 (aged 80); Chicago, Illinois
- Education: Phillips Academy; Yale University
- Occupation: Railroad executive
- Spouse: Margaret Worth Thornton (m. 1901)

Isaac Wheeler Geer (February 1, 1873 – June 20, 1953) was an executive with the Pennsylvania Railroad known for his involvement in labor disputes.

== Education and early career ==
Geer was born in Plainfield, Connecticut, to David and Eunice Witter Geer. After graduating from Phillips Academy, Andover, Isaac attended Yale, earning several awards in science and mathematics. He served as editor of the Yale Scientific Magazine. After graduating, Geer worked as an engineer on several major rail lines through the Midwest. By 1906, he had become superintendent of the Logansport division of the Pennsylvania Railroad and was based in St. Louis. In 1920, Isaac was promoted to general manager.

== Labor dispute (1921) ==
In 1921 Geer became embroiled in a dispute with labor unions. The unions claimed that Geer had authorized railroad executives to "defame" labor unions in order to force them to reveal information on the unions and on wage cuts. The unions produced a letter purportedly by Geer; but Geer denied having written it. During hearings of the United States Railway Labor Board, union lawyers failed to prove the authenticity of the letter.

== Personal life ==
On October 23, 1901, Geer married Margaret Worth Thornton, sister of Sir Henry Worth Thornton, cousin of Judge William Wheeler Thornton, and niece of Dr. William Patton Thornton.

The Geers had two children: Helen Thornton Geer, professor of library science and Margaret Worth Geer.

Isaac Wheeler Geer died at his home in Chicago on June 20, 1953.
