= Arthur Martin Graffis =

American automotive engineer (1885–1933)

- Born: October 13, 1885; Logansport, Indiana
- Died: November 4, 1933 (aged 48)
- Occupation: Engineer
- Years active: 1915–1933
- Employer: Auburn Automobile
- Spouse: Kate Moores
- Children: 3
- Family: Thornton family of Logansport

Arthur Martin Graffis ("Mike")(October 13, 1885 in Logansport, Indiana – November 4, 1933) was an American automotive engineer, serving as Chief Engineer of Auburn Automobile (1915–1922) and as Chief Engineer (1922–1932) and Interim President (1930) of Elcar Automotive. During Elcar's bankruptcy, A. M. Graffis ("Mike") was appointed court trustee of Elcar's assets. He led a two-year battle (1931–33) to attract investors and save the company, but was killed in an automobile accident. The company was dissolved shortly thereafter.

== Family ==
Arthur Graffis came from a prominent family of engineers. His grandfather, Abraham Graffis, built most of the covered bridges in Cass County, Indiana, and had substantial land holdings around Logansport. His father, William Graffis, was an influential businessman, founder of Graffis & Sons Shoe Company, and an organizer of the Logansport State Bank.

Through his grandmother, Elizabeth Thornton Graffis, he was a member of the influential Thornton family of Logansport, Indiana. His grandmother was a sister of prominent lawyer Henry Clay Thornton, father of Sir Henry Worth Thornton; Dr. William Patton Thornton, a prominent Cincinnati physician; and Dr. Joseph Lyle Thornton, a prominent educator and Past-President of the Ohio Valley Paper Company. Judge William Wheeler Thornton, academic Helen Thornton Geer, socialite James Worth Thornton, and silver screen actress Edna Goodrich were cousins.

Arthur M. Graffis was married to Kate Moores and had three sons: Arthur Jr., William, and Harry.
