= James Worth Thornton =

American businessman (1906–1983)

- Born: September 19, 1906; United States
- Died: February 6, 1983 (aged 76); Virginia, U.S.
- Occupation: Businessman
- Known for: Member of the socially connected Thorntons of Indiana family
- Spouses: Elena Mumm (m. 1932; div. 1946) Martha Armstrong (m. 1958)
- Children: 1
- Parents: Sir Henry Worth Thornton (father); Virginia Blair (mother)

James Worth Thornton (September 19, 1906 – February 6, 1983) was an American businessman and scion of the politically and socially connected Thorntons of Indiana. Thornton also appeared in the journals of noted essayist Edmund Wilson.

== Early life ==
Thornton was born into a prominent family in the railroad business and enjoyed a privileged childhood. He was the son of Sir Henry Worth Thornton and Virginia Blair (daughter of banker and steel magnate George Dike Blair).

He was a second cousin of silver screen actress Edna Goodrich and Elcar Interim President Arthur Martin Graffis. His cousin, Helen Thornton Geer, was a prominent librarian and researcher. Through his maternal line, he was related to the powerful Cox family: billionaire heiresses Anne Cox Chambers and Barbara Cox Anthony were his second cousins.

He graduated from the Royal Military College of Canada, Ontario.

== Career ==
While working in Europe, Thornton earned a reputation as an international playboy: he was reportedly an excellent polo player and prominent in social circles. While working for a firm in Frankfurt, Germany, in 1931, he married Baroness Elena Mumm von Schwarzenstein. After their marriage, Thornton served as Vice-President of the Mumm family's American Incorporation.

Thornton joined the Central Intelligence Agency in 1950, retiring in 1958 upon marrying Martha Florence Armstrong.

== Personal life ==
In 1931, Thornton married Elena Mumm Thornton Wilson|Helene-Marthe "Elena" Mumm von Schwarzenstein, a German-Russian-French aristocrat and partial heir to the Mumm champagne fortune. Her maternal relations (the Struve family) were prominent Russian diplomats and astronomers. Before their divorce, James and Elena were the parents of one son: Henry Hermann Mumm Thornton (born 1932),

Shortly after marriage, James and Elena moved to Montreal and, then, to New York City, where Elena served as an assistant editor for Town & Country (magazine). While working as an editor, Elena met Edmund Wilson, the prominent author and critic, and fell in love. In 1946, Elena and Edmund fled to Reno, Nevada, divorced their respective spouses, and married, creating a minor media sensation. Elena Mumm Thornton was Edmund Wilson’s fourth wife.

=== Second marriage ===
In 1958, Thornton married Martha Florence Armstrong, a granddaughter of the 1st Baronet Armstrong. After their marriage, the Thorntons moved frequently, living in New York City, Spain, Bermuda, Florida, and northern Virginia.

Thornton died on February 6, 1983.

=== Descendants ===
Thornton's grandchildren include Dr. Sandra Christine Thornton-Whitehouse (wife of Sheldon Whitehouse, U.S. Senator from Rhode Island); Elena Thornton Kissel (wife of musician and producer, Michael Case Kissel, a direct descendant of Cornelius Vanderbilt); Nina Rosalie McMann; and James Speno Mumm Thornton.
