= Samuel W. Thornton =

American politician from Nebraska (1832–1917

Samuel W. Thornton (October 23, 1832 in Madison County, Ohio – July 20, 1917 in Kearney, Nebraska) was a prominent farmer, businessman, soldier, and politician. He was elected to serve one term in the Nebraska State Legislature (1887), representing Buffalo County.

== Early years ==
Samuel W. Thornton was the son of Abner and Esther Strain Thornton. His father was a member of a large Scots-Irish and devoutly Presbyterian family that had migrated to Ohio from South Carolina over opposition to slavery During the American Civil War, Samuel joined the Union Army, fighting with Company C, 8th Regiment, Iowa Infantry. He participated in several of the bloodiest battles of the war, including the Battle of Shiloh, Battle of Vicksburg, and Battle of Memphis, where he was shot in the thigh and hospitalized until the end of the war.

Returning home to Washington County, Iowa, he was hailed as a war hero and served in a series of elected positions: city collector, marshal, assessor, and one term as Deputy Sheriff. He also conducted the 1870 census of Washington County, Iowa.

== Buffalo County, Nebraska ==
In 1874 Samuel and his family moved to Buffalo County, Nebraska, a sparsely settled frontier land where farming was difficult and time-consuming. For the first few years, the farm teetered on ruin; however, by the end of the decade, Samuel began having tremendous success, and his reputation amongst local farmers grew accordingly. He served on various committees of the Buffalo County Agricultural and Mechanical Society. In 1883, the County Board named the area around Samuel Thornton's homestead as Thornton Township, Buffalo County, Nebraska, in honor of his military service. This honor was followed by his being elected to the state legislature (1887).

For the last thirty years of his life, Samuel remained in Buffalo County. While he continued farming, he expanded his business interests into the grocery business and utilities. He also stayed close with his fellow Civil War veterans, serving as post chaplain and speaking at the unveiling of the Civil War Soldiers’ Monument, Kearney, Nebraska, on October 25, 1910. Pictures of Samuel Thornton's old homestead can be located at the Nebraska Historical Society, Lincoln, Nebraska.

== Family ==
Samuel W. Thornton married Sarah Larimer on September 14, 1854, and had eight children: Eva, William, Charles, Mary Etta, Harry Lyle, Mabel, Kate, and Lillie. William would later serve as president, Board of Directors, Union Valley Telephone Company. Samuel later married Dallastine Hopkins.

Samuel was a cousin of Military Reconstruction Judge James Johnston Thornton of Seguin, Texas, and the Thorntons of Logansport: William Patton Thornton, Judge William Wheeler Thornton, and Sir Henry Worth Thornton.
