= Courthouse Historic District =

Courthouse Historic District may refer to:

- Courthouse Historic District (Logansport, Indiana), listed on the National Register of Historic Places in Cass County, Indiana
- Courthouse Historic District (Kalispell, Montana), listed on the National Register of Historic Places in Flathead County, Montana
- Courthouse Residential Historic District, listed on the National Register of Historic Places in Iron County, Michigan
