= James Johnston Thornton =

American judge (1816–1884)

James Johnston Thornton (November 24, 1816, in Highland County, Ohio – February 29, 1884, in Guadalupe County, Texas) was an Americsn military reconstruction judge, land developer, and quartermaster of the Union Army. He was also the uncle of famed businessman and philanthropist George Washington Brackenridge of San Antonio, Texas.

== Early years ==
Thornton was a member of a pioneering Ohio and Indiana family that had migrated to the region from South Carolina over opposition to slavery. The Thorntons and related families were devout Scots-Irish Presbyterians and formed a supportive community on Rattlesnake Creek, Ohio. His parents, John and Mary Johnston Thornton, raised twelve children in central Ohio and were respected farmers in the local communities. Several of their sons became soldiers; several others became pioneering ministers.

According to Thornton's sister, Minerva Thornton Bickell, James J. Thornton was an avid reader and left home at the age of 19 to pursue an education: he worked constantly and studied, spending a term at Bloomington College (now, University of Indiana at Bloomington) and teaching preparatory classes (1835). After Thornton's family moved to the Logansport, Indiana, area, in 1836, he worked with the engineers building the Erie Canal that ran from Bloomington to the Ohio River in southern Indiana.

== Practicing law ==
Thornton subsequently moved to southern Indiana and read law in the office of prominent local attorney, John A. Brackenridge. When Abraham Lincoln was reading law, the future president visited the courtroom to hear Brackenridge's oratory and later borrowed books. Thornton excelled in his studies and was named justice of the peace for Warrick County, Indiana (1842).

However, by the end of the 1840s, Thornton began hearing glowing reports from family members and friends who had travelled to Texas and told of the availability of land and new opportunities. Thornton was sold and packed his family off to Seguin, Texas, where he opened a land office and practiced law.

== Texas ==
Over the next decade, Thornton's business boomed: he served as clerk to the mayor and board of aldermen and was county representative to the state temperance society. He also served as secretary of the board of trustees of the Guadalupe Male and Female College.

Thornton's letters home attracted other family members and friends to the area. In 1853 his brother Harvey visited the area to take photographs and tour the area; however, after a few letters home, he was never heard from again. The Brackenridges became interested in the area and moved to join their Thornton cousins: James Thornton had married the sister of John A. Brackenridge's wife, uniting the two families. From this beginning, the Brackenridges would grow to become powerful bankers, builders, landowners, feminists, and philanthropists in the San Antonio, Texas, and Austin, Texas, communities.

During the American Civil War, however, the Thornton family was pro-Union, which created local hostility. For safety, the family moved to Minnesota to wait out the war. After his brother, Henry Harrison Thornton, was killed at the Battle of Stones River, Thornton decided to enlist in the Union Army and, with his connections, received an appointment to the Quartermaster Corps and was named commissary of the brigade, serving under General Nathaniel P. Banks. While on his way to the Siege of Vicksburg, Thornton became ill and was forced to return to Minnesota to recuperate. After the war, for health reasons, his doctors advised that he return to Texas.

== Military reconstruction ==
Upon returning to Texas, which was under a provisional government, Thornton was appointed judge of the 24th District Court and oversaw the re-imposition of federal authority, including forcing former Confederates to swear allegiance to the United States in order to conduct business and to vote. This undoubtedly resulted in hostility towards the family and great stress which took a toll on Thornton's health. After approximately ten years on the bench, he suffered a stroke and partial paralysis from which he never recovered.

Thornton also enumerated the 1870 Census for Seguin, Texas.

Thornton was buried at the Old Denman Place, Guadalupe County, Texas. The land was part of the estate of Thornton's brother-in-law and Texas pioneer, politician, and businessman, Claiborne West, signer of the Texas Declaration of Independence.

== Family ==
Thornton married William Ann McCulla (McCullough) on September 8, 1842, in Warrick County, Indiana, and had issue: James M. Thornton, Anna, William, Isabella, and George Thomas.

Thornton was also a cousin of the prominent Thornton family of Logansport, Indiana. His relatives included Sir Henry Worth Thornton, Judge William Wheeler Thornton, Dr. William Patton Thornton, and Honorable Samuel W. Thornton, a member of the Nebraska Legislature.
