= Thornton Township =

Thornton Township may refer to:

- Thornton Township, Illinois
- Thornton Township, Nebraska
- Thornton Township, Craig County, Oklahoma (historical)

== See also ==
- Thornton (disambiguation)
