= Samuel Thornton =

Samuel Thornton may refer to:

- Samuel Thornton (MP) (1754–1838), director of the Bank of England and British Member of Parliament
- Samuel Thornton (bishop) (1835–1917), Anglican bishop
- Samuel W. Thornton, farmer, businessman, soldier, and politician in the Nebraska State Legislature
