= List of Indiana state historical markers in Cass County =

Location of Cass County in Indiana

This is a list of the Indiana state historical markers in Cass County.

This is intended to be a detailed table of the official state historical marker placed in Cass County, Indiana, United States by the Indiana Historical Bureau. The location of the historical marker and its latitude and longitude coordinates are included below when available, along with its name, year of placement, and topics as recorded by the Historical Bureau. There is 1 historical marker located in Cass County.

== Historical marker ==
Marker title	Image	Year placed	Location	Topics
Wabash and Erie Canal		1966	Southeastern corner of the junction of High and Fifth Streets in Logansport; 40°45′23″N 86°21′54″W	Transportation, Business, Industry, and Labor

== See also ==
- List of Indiana state historical markers
- National Register of Historic Places listings in Cass County, Indiana
