= Bankers Row Historic District =

Historic district in Indiana, United States

- U.S. National Register of Historic Places
- U.S. Historic district
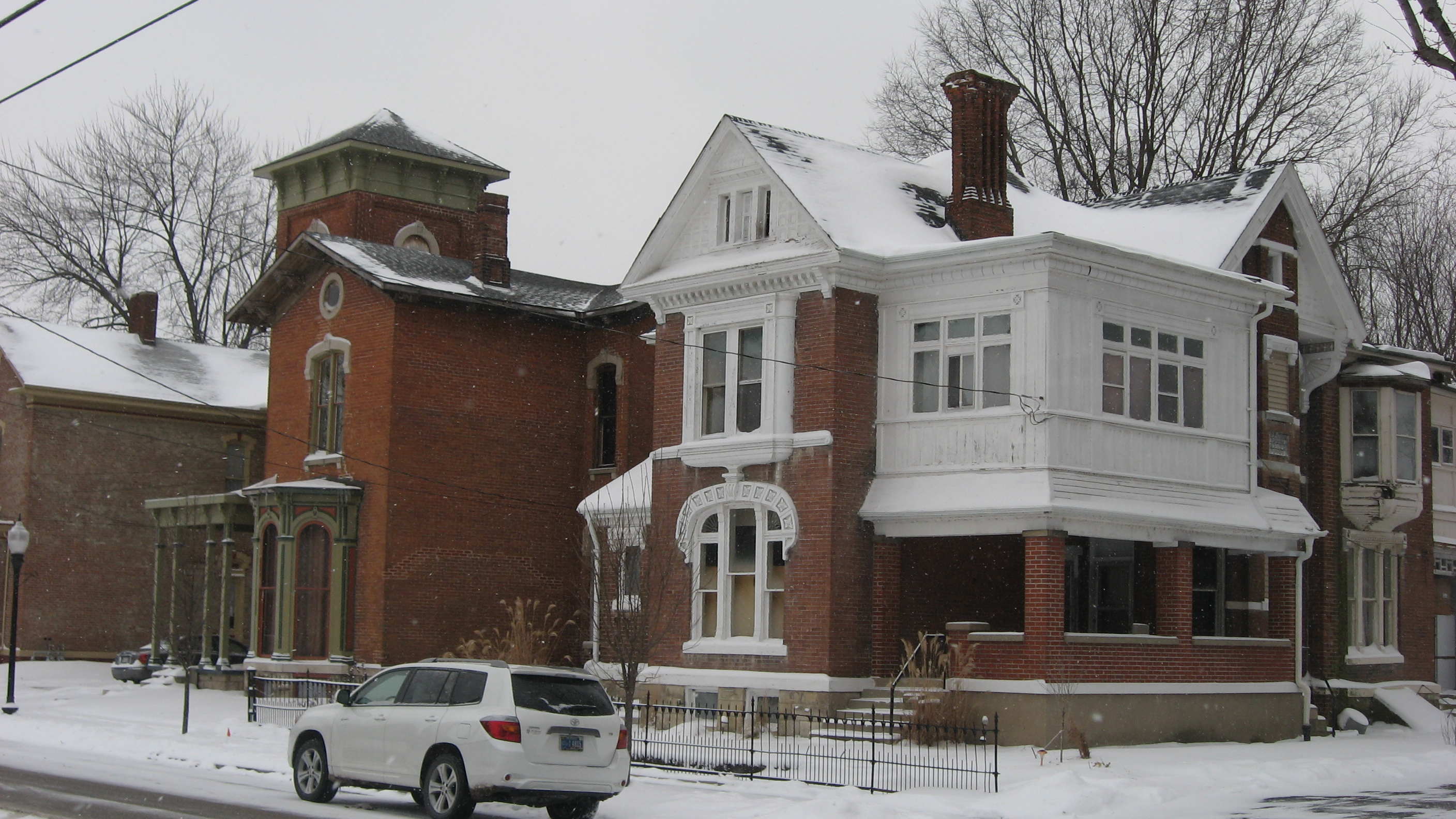
- Bankers Row Historic District, January 2012

- Location within Cass County, Indiana Location within Indiana Location within the United States
- Location: Eel River Ave., from Market to Third, Logansport, Indiana
- Coordinates: 40°45′13″N 86°22′09″W
- Area: 9.5 acres (3.8 ha)
- Architectural style: Queen Anne, Italianate, et al.
- NRHP reference No.: 99001149
- Added to NRHP: September 17, 1999

Bankers Row Historic District is a national historic district located at Logansport, Indiana. The district encompasses 20 contributing houses in a residential section of Logansport. It developed between about 1875 and 1925 and includes notable examples of Queen Anne and Italianate style architecture. Bankers Row gains significance because it is associated with the growth and development of Logansport. The town gained commercial success in 1840 with the Wabash & Erie Canal, and then in the 1850s, when the first railroad came through town. The name "Bankers Row" was given to these homes by locals in the 1960s because of its association in the earlier part of the century, with men in the field of finance and banking.

It was listed on the National Register of Historic Places in 1999.

== Description ==
Bankers Row Historic District is a single row of historic buildings, on the northeast side of Eel River Avenue in Logansport, Indiana. The homes face the street and with the Eel River as their backyard. These lots are on a low bluff above the Eel Rivers flood levels. The buildings are slightly set back from the avenue, with only a few empty lots. Most buildings were built within the period of 1890 - 1900. The historic district is the northwest boundary of the old downtown. The south side of Eel River Avenue is the northern border of the Point Historic District.

1. 72 Eel River Avenue; Gabled Ell; c.1880–1900
2. 76 Eel River Avenue; Bungalow; c. 1910
3. 80 Eel River Avenue; Queen Anne; c. 1895
4. 94 Eel River Avenue; Queen Anne; c. 1890
5. 98 Eel River Avenue; Italianate; c. 1875
6. 102 Eel River Avenue; Queen Anne; c. 1900
7. 110 Eel River Avenue; Wiggs House; Queen Anne; c. 1885
8. 118 Eel River Avenue; Fines-Campbell House; Queen Anne; 1878–1894
9. 124 Eel River Avenue; Italianate; c. 1880
10. 128 Eel River Avenue; Oilman House; Italianate/Greek Revival; c. 1880
11. 136 Eel River Avenue; Italianate/ Italian Villa; c.1875
12. 142 Eel River Avenue; Queen Anne; c. 1890
13. 200 Eel River Avenue; American Four-Square/Prairie; c. 1890–1905
14. 204 Eel River Avenue; Queen Anne; c. 1900
15. 208 Eel River Avenue; Queen Anne/Colonial Revival; c.1900
16. 210 Eel River Avenue; Queen Anne; c. 1895
17. 218 Eel River Avenue; Queen Anne/Italianate; C. 1880
18. 222 Eel River Avenue; American Four Square/Queen Anne; c. 1900
19. 226-228 Eel River Avenue; Gable Front; c. 1920

== Bibliography ==
- Blumenthal, John J. - G. Identifying American Architecture, A Pictorial Guide to Styles and Terms 1600-1945 Nashville, TN: American Association for State and Local History,977 1977.
- Cass County Interim Report, Indiana Historic Sites and Structures Survey. Indianapolis, IN: Indiana Dept. of Natural Resources, Division of Historic Preservation & Archaeology, June 1984.
- Cornelius, L'Dean and Julian, R. W., Eds. Where Two Rivers Meet, A View of the Past. Logansport, IN: Cass County Historical Society, 1978.
- Helm, Thomas B. History of Cass County, Indiana; from the earliest time to the present ... Evansville, IN: Unigraphic, Inc., 1970, Reprint, originally published Chicago: Brant & Fuller, 1886.
- Houk, Richard J. The Geography of Logansport, Indiana, MA Thesis, Department of Geology & Geography, Indiana University, October, 1942.
- Kloenne, C. E., Julius, C. Map of the City of Logansport, Cass County, Indiana, 1876.
- Longwell & Cummings. Directory of Logansport, Indiana, 1892–93. Logansport, IN: Longwell & Cummings, 1892.
- McAlester, Virginia & Lee. Field Guide to American Houses. New York: Alfred A. Knopf, 1992.
- Poppeliers, John. What Style Is It? Washington DC: The Preservation Press, 1977.
- Powell, Jehu Z. History of Cass county, Indiana: From its earliest settlement to the present time; with biographical sketches and reference to biographies previously compiled, Vol. I & Vol. II. Evansville, IN: Unigraphic, 1972, Reprint, originally published by Lewis Publishing Co., 1913.
- Schulz, Miss Mary, ed. Old Homes of Logansport, Indiana. Logansport, Indiana: Typed MSS, Cass County Historical Society, 1960.
- Taber, Graham. History of Logansport and Cass County. Logansport, IN: Pharos-Tribune, n.d.
- Wright, W. Swift. Pastime Sketches: Scenes and Events at "The Mouth of Eel on the
