= Washington School (Logansport, Indiana) =

- Formerly listed on the U.S. National Register of Historic Places
- Location within Cass County, Indiana Location within Indiana Location within the United States
- Location: 101 N. Cicott St., Logansport, Indiana
- Coordinates: 40°44′55″N 86°22′40″W
- Area: 1.4 acres (0.57 ha)
- Built: 1899
- Architect: Alexander, J. F.; Troutman, J. F.
- Architectural style: Romanesque, Richardsonian Romanesque
- NRHP reference No.: 81000027

Significant dates
- Added to NRHP: March 2, 1981
- Removed from NRHP: February 1, 1985

Washington School was a historic school building located at Logansport, Indiana. It was built in 1899, and was a two-story, square, Richardsonian Romanesque style building of yellow brick with limestone trim. It featured a round arch entrance, projecting bays, and a limestone portico supported by paired Ionic order columns on the second story. A gymnasium addition was erected in the late-1950s.

It was listed on the National Register of Historic Places in 1981 and delisted in 1985.
