= Battle of Memphis =

Battle of Memphis may refer to two engagements during the American Civil War near Memphis, Tennessee:

- First Battle of Memphis, a naval battle on the Mississippi River on June 6, 1862
- Second Battle of Memphis, a cavalry raid by Nathan Bedford Forrest on August 21, 1864

== See also ==
- Tennessee in the American Civil War
- Memphis (disambiguation)
