= Phyllis A. Balch =

American nutritionist and author (1930–2004)

Phyllis A. Balch (née Henning; September 18, 1930 – December 31, 2004) was the author of Prescription for Nutritional Healing.

Phyllis A. Henning was born in Logansport, Indiana. Certified by American Association of Nutritional Consultants in the 1970s, she was a nutritional consultant and a top nutritional counselor. She became one of the biggest-selling dietary and supplement authors. Her books have sold over eight million copies.

Before her career as an author, she owned a nightclub, Shannon's Roaring Twenties, in Indianapolis. She had adopted the name Shannon while working as a dance instructor in Syracuse, New York. She was struggling with depression, weight gain, and other health issues when a friend recommended the book How to Get Well by Paavo Airola. This inspired her to change her diet to one of natural foods.

Her publisher, Avery, sued Balch and her husband for breach of contract, slander, trade infringement, and false advertising in 1992 when Avery discovered that the Balches were selling Prescription for Nutritional Healing in competition with Avery. The Balches countersued for breach of contract, fraud, poor accounting, and negligence.

She died in Cape Coral, Florida on December 31, 2004, aged 74.

== Works ==
- Prescription for Cooking. With James F. Balch. P.A.B. Pub., 1987; ISBN 0942023005
- Prescription for Nutritional Healing. With James. F. Balch. Avery, 1990; ISBN 089529429X. First self-published in the 1980s under the title Nutritional Outline for the Professional.
- Prescription for Herbal Healing. Avery, 2002; ISBN 0-89529-869-4
- Prescription for Dietary Wellness. PAB Books, 1992; ISBN 0942023021
