= Kendrick-Baldwin House =

Historic house in Indiana, United States

- U.S. National Register of Historic Places
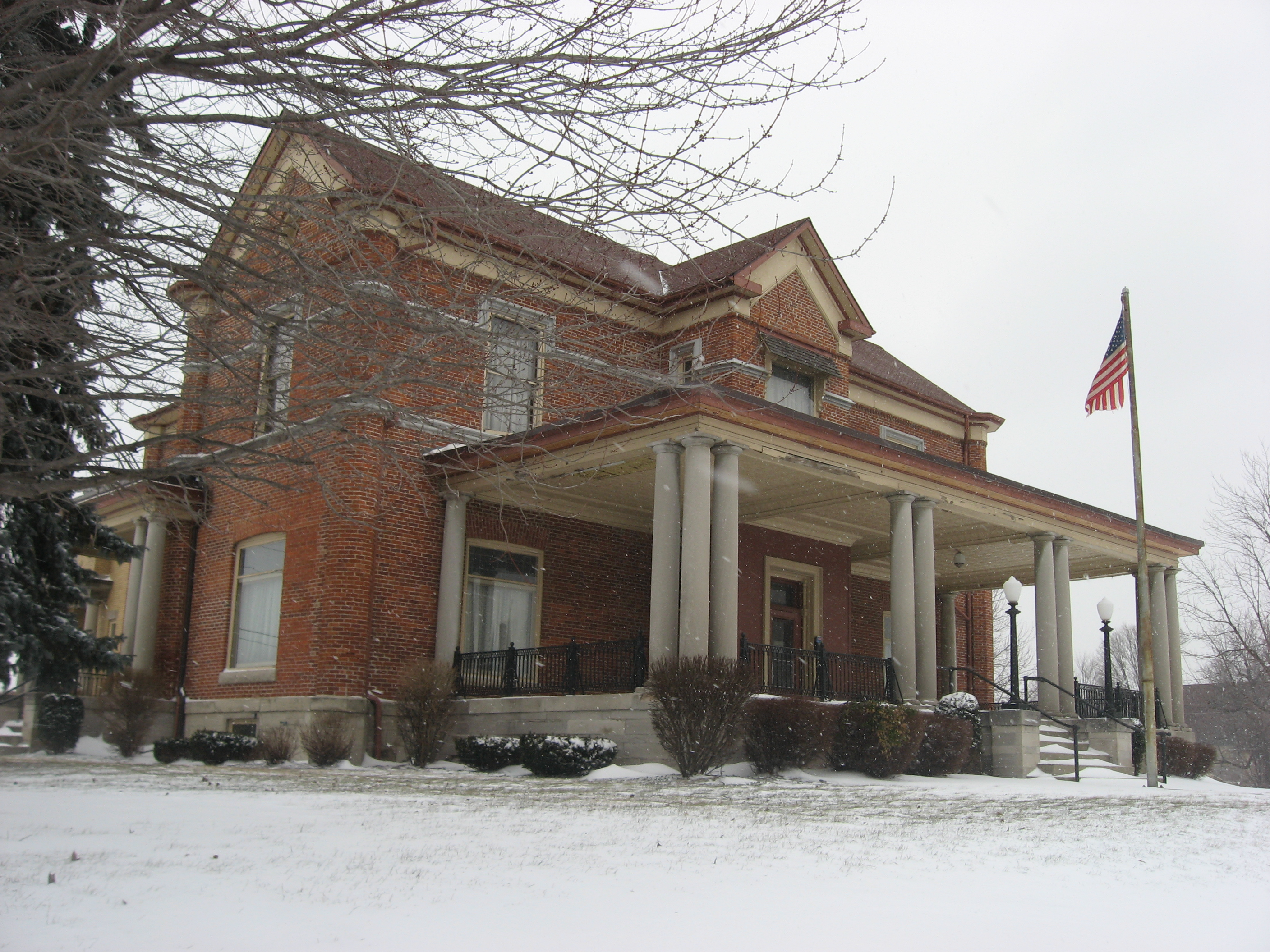
- Kendrick-Baldwin House, January 2012

- Location within Cass County, Indiana Location within Indiana Location within the United States
- Location: 706 E. Market St., Logansport, Indiana
- Coordinates: 40°45′13″N 86°21′39″W
- Area: less than one acre
- Built: 1860
- Built by: Bevan, George
- Architectural style: Italianate
- NRHP reference No.: 82000060
- Added to NRHP: September 9, 1982

Kendrick-Baldwin House, also known as the Cass County Memorial Home, is a historic home located at Logansport, Indiana. It was built in 1860, and is a 2 1/2-story, "T"-plan, Italianate style brick dwelling. It has a two-story brick addition erected about 1922. It features a full-width, one-story front porch supported by Doric order limestone columns and added between 1920 and 1922, when the building was renovated for use as a veteran's home.

The house was built in 1860 by a local carpenter, George Bevan, for Stuart B. Kendrick, a wealthy local banker originally from New York. The house was constructed as a copy of a home known as "The Castle" on the Hudson River. Following the failure of Kendrick's bank in 1865, he sold the home to a local Presbyterian academy. It was used as school until 1875, when it became a boarding house. In the late 1870s, Daniel P. Baldwin (a judge who would later serve as Indiana Attorney General from 1880 to 1882) purchased the home, living there until his death in 1908. Baldwin's niece later sold the home in 1920 to a local American Legion post, Cass County Post 60. Funding for the building's 1920-1922 addition came from legislation passed which allowed for the appropriation of money for the constructions of buildings dedicated to veterans of the First World War. Since 1922, the building has been used for meetings by local organizations.

It was listed on the National Register of Historic Places in 1982.
