= Memphis =

Memphis most commonly refers to:

- Memphis, Egypt, a former capital of ancient Egypt
- Memphis, Tennessee, a major American city

Memphis may also refer to:

== Astronomy ==
- Memphis Facula, a prominent region on Ganymede, moon of Jupiter

== Places ==
=== United States ===
- Memphis, Alabama, a town
- Memphis, Florida, a census-designated place
- Memphis, Indiana, a census-designated place
- Memphis, Michigan, a city
- Memphis, Mississippi, a village
- Memphis, Missouri, a city
- Memphis, Nebraska, a village
- Memphis, New York, a hamlet
- Memphis, Ohio, an unincorporated community
- Memphis metropolitan area, centered on Memphis, Tennessee
- Memphis, Texas, a city

=== Elsewhere ===
- Mampsis, Mamshit or Memphis, a Nabatean city

== Arts and entertainment ==
=== Music ===
- Memphis (band), a musical duo
- Memphis Industries, a record label
- Memphis (musical), a Broadway musical by David Bryan and Joe DiPietro

==== Albums ====
- Memphis (Boz Scaggs album), 2013
- Memphis (Roy Orbison album), 1972
- Coin Coin Chapter Four: Memphis, 2019

==== Songs ====
- "Memphis, Tennessee" (song) or "Memphis", by Chuck Berry, 1959; covered by many performers
- "Memphis" (The Badloves song), 1994
- "Memphis" (Joe Jackson song), 1983
- "Memphis", by Donnie Brooks, 1961
- "Memphis", by David Nail, 2002
- "Memphis", by Justin Bieber from Journals, 2013
- "Memphis", by Justin Timberlake from Everything I Thought It Was, 2024
- "Memphis", by White Zombie from Psycho-Head Blowout, 1987

=== Film ===
- Memphis (1992 film), an American television film
- Memphis (2013 film), a film directed by Tim Sutton.
- Randall 'Memphis' Raines, a character in Gone in 60 Seconds

=== Design ===
- Memphis (typeface), a slab-serif typeface designed in 1929 by Rudolf Wolf
- Memphis Group, an influential design movement of Italian designers and architects in the 1980s

== Maritime transport ==
- USS Memphis (CA-10), a US Navy armored cruiser wrecked by a tsunami in 1916
- USS Memphis (SSN-691), a nuclear attack submarine of the United States Navy
- CSS Memphis Confederate Battery converted from floating dry dock 1861

== People ==
- Memphis Bleek, New York rapper
- Memphis Depay, Dutch footballer
- Ricky Memphis, Italian actor

== Other uses ==
- Memphis (mythology), the wife of Epaphus, who was, according to legend, the founder of Memphis, Egypt
- Memphis (butterfly), a genus of brush-footed butterflies
- Memphis (cigarette), a cigarette brand of Austria Tabak
- Windows 98, codenamed Memphis during development
- City of Memphis (train), a passenger train route

== See also ==
- University of Memphis, a public university in Memphis, Tennessee
- Memphis Tigers, the athletic programs of the University of Memphis
- West Memphis, Arkansas, part of the Memphis, Tennessee, metropolitan area
- Memphis La Blusera, an Argentine blues band
- Memphis Grizzlies, American professional basketball team based in Memphis, Tennessee
- Corporate Memphis, an art style.
