= John Keip House =

Historic house in Indiana, United States

- U.S. National Register of Historic Places
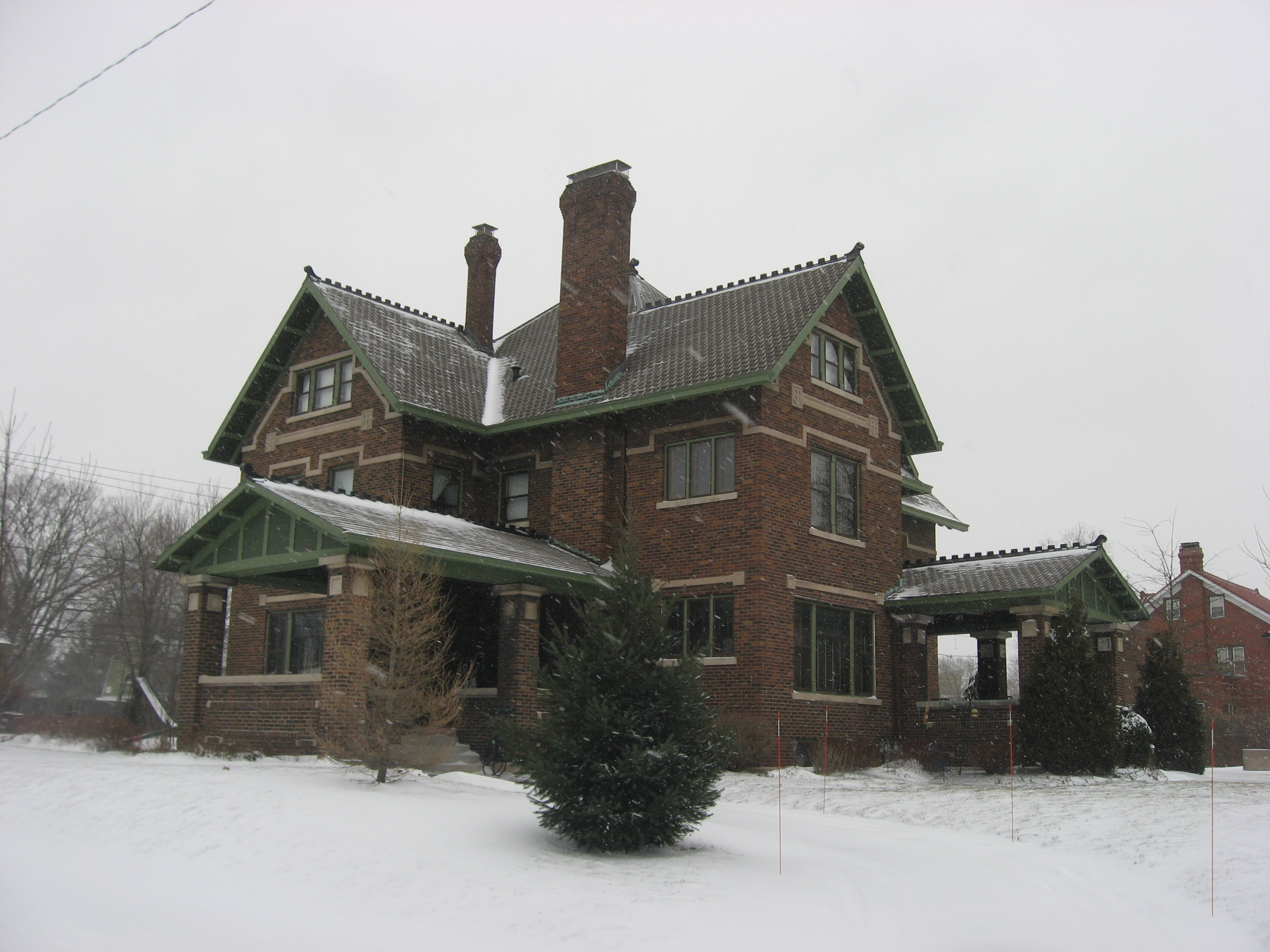
- John Keip House, January 2012

- Location within Cass County, Indiana Location within Indiana Location within the United States
- Location: 2500 E. Broadway Ave., Logansport, Indiana
- Coordinates: 40°45′34″N 86°20′11″W
- Area: less than one acre
- Built: 1915
- Architectural style: Bungalow/craftsman
- NRHP reference No.: 04001307
- Added to NRHP: December 6, 2004

John Keip House is a historic home located at Logansport, Indiana, United States. It was built in 1915, and is a 2 1/2-story, "L"-plan brick dwelling with American Craftsman style design elements. It has a hipped roof with overhanging eaves and exposed rafter tails, entrance porch with large square brick columns, porte cochere, and leaded glass windows. Also on the property is a contributing garage and concrete steps.

John Keip was the manager of a brewery. The home was listed on the National Register of Historic Places in 2004.
