= Robert Ferguson House =

Historic house in Delaware, United States

- U.S. National Register of Historic Places
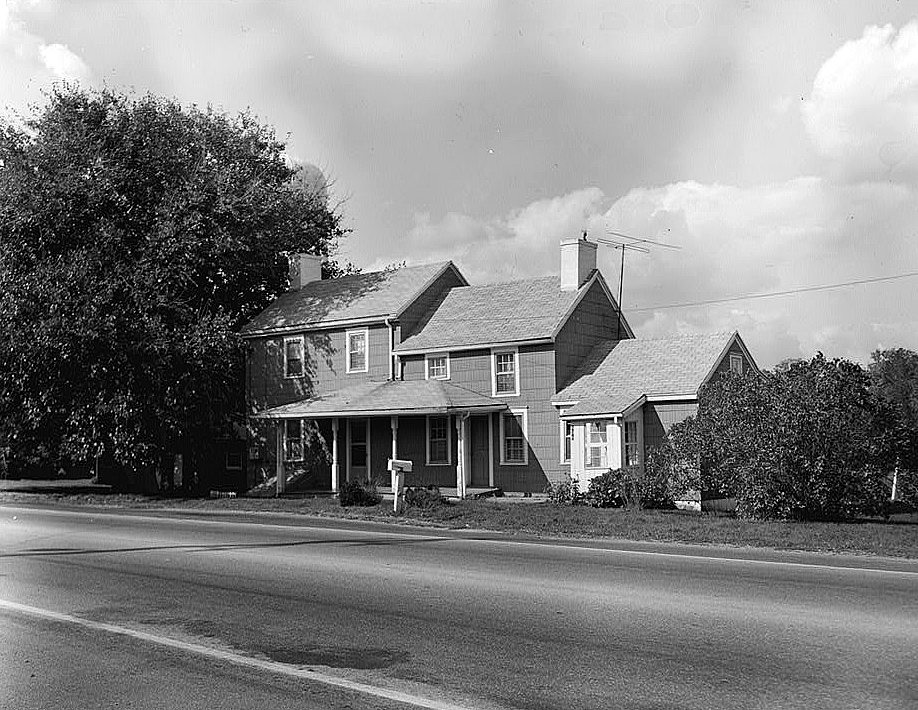
- Robert Ferguson House in 1980

- Location within Delaware Location within the United States
- Location: 636 Chestnut Hill Rd., east of Newark, Delaware
- Coordinates: 39.673333°N 75.706667°W
- Area: 3.5 acres (1.4 ha)
- Built: c. 1800, c. 1835, c. 1900
- NRHP reference No.: 79000628
- Added to NRHP: July 22, 1979

Robert Ferguson House was a historic home located near Newark, New Castle County, Delaware. The original was built between 1790 and 1810, and formed a two-story, two-bay, single pile frame section. A lower, two-story one-room section was added about 1835 and a one-story, two-bay section was added about 1900. Also on the property was a contributing shed.

It was added to the National Register of Historic Places in 1979. The buildings were demolished during the widening of Delaware Route 4 in the early 1980s.
