= Helen Thornton Geer =

American librarian

Helen Thornton Geer (January 7, 1903 in New Castle, Pennsylvania – March 1983 in New Jersey) was a librarian and professor. She was the author of Charging Systems, which detailed 17 of the different circulation control systems that were used in most of the U.S. public and college libraries at the time. From 1947 to 1956, she served as headquarters librarian of the American Library Association, Chicago, Illinois.

== Education and career ==
After graduating from Wheaton College (AB: ENG LIT) in 1926 and the University of Illinois (BS: Library Science) in 1928, she entered Columbia University, earning her M.S. in library science (1934). In 1929 she began work at the Flushing Branch, Queens Borough Public Library, New York City. During the next fifteen years, she was promoted frequently, culminating in her appointment as acting head of the Business and Science Division (1942–44).

After briefly working at the Harper Library, University of Chicago, Geer was named headquarters librarian for the American Library Association, a position she held from 1947 until 1956. Also, she served as president of the Chicago Library Club (1953–54). From 1956 to 1958, Helen Geer served as director of The Library Mart, an operations consultancy for libraries and manufacturers.

From 1964 to 1969, Geer was an associate professor at the Graduate School of Library Science, University of Rhode Island.

== Family ==
Geer was the daughter of Isaac Wheeler Geer, a prominent railroad executive, and Margaret Worth Thornton. She was the niece of Sir Henry Worth Thornton. Her sister, Margaret Worth Geer, was married to State Rep. John H. Kleine (R-Lake Forest, Ill.). She was a second cousin of silver screen actress Edna Goodrich and Interim Elcar President Arthur Martin Graffis.
