= Logansport, Indiana =

- City
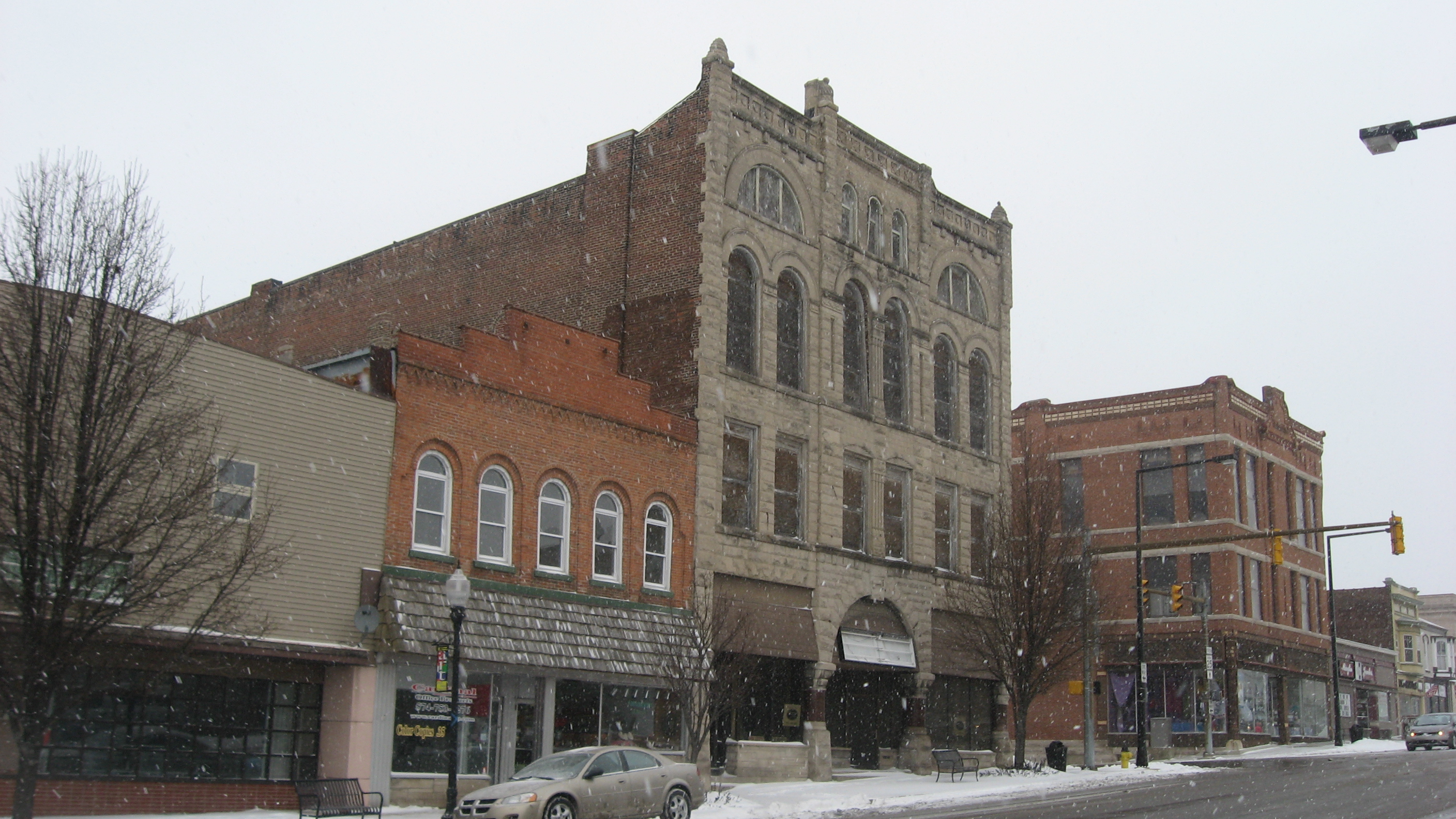
- Buildings on Broadway in Logansport

- Seal

- Location of Logansport in Cass County, Indiana

- Location within Indiana Location within the United States
- Coordinates: 40°45′13″N 86°21′38″W
- Country: United States
- State: Indiana
- County: Cass
- Townships: Eel, Washington, Noble, Clay, Clinton
- Incorporated (city): 1838

Government
  - Mayor: Jacob Pomasl (R) (Note: Serving as an interim mayor until the position is filled by a caucus held by the Cass County Republican Party.)

Area
  - Total: 10.72 sq mi (27.77 km^{2})
  - Land: 10.49 sq mi (27.18 km^{2})
  - Water: 0.23 sq mi (0.59 km^{2}) 2.45%
- Elevation: 604 ft (184 m)

Population (2020)
  - Total: 18,366
  - Density: 1,750.1/sq mi (675.73/km^{2})
- Time zone: UTC-5 (EST)
  - Summer (DST): UTC-4 (EDT)
- ZIP code: 46947
- Area code: 574
- FIPS code: 18-44658
- GNIS feature ID: 2395746
- Website: www.in.gov/cities/logansport/

Logansport is a city in and the county seat of Cass County, Indiana, United States. The population was 18,366 at the 2020 census. Logansport is located in northern Indiana at the junction of the Wabash and Eel rivers, northwest of Kokomo.

== History ==
Logansport was settled c. 1826 and named after a Shawnee warrior named James Logan, better known as "Captain Logan," who served as a scout for U.S. forces in the surrounding area during the War of 1812.

Logansport is home to a refurbished Dentzel Carousel. Of many carousels built by the Dentzel Carousel Company, the refurbished Dentzel Carousel is "one of the three earliest Dentzel menagerie carousels that are virtually intact". The carousel resides in Riverside Park on the banks of the Eel River. Riders may attempt to grab a brass ring while riding, this carousel game serves as the current basis for the local economic-development slogan “Logansport – Cass County: Grab the brass ring”. The Carousel is on the National Register of Historic Places and is a national landmark. Also listed on the National Register of Historic Places are the Bankers Row Historic District, Courthouse Historic District, Ferguson House, Jerolaman-Long House, John Keip House, Kendrick-Baldwin House, Willard B. Place House, Point Historic District, Pollard-Nelson House, and Henry Tousley House.

Logansport Community High School is the home of the oldest known high school mascot in Indiana, the animated Felix the Cat. Three competing legends claim to tell its origin story, however all accounts agree that Felix was brought into the high school's tradition at some point between 1925 and 1926.

Logansport also has a diverse transportation history. The Wabash and Erie Canal reached Logansport in 1837, contributing the “port” to Logansport's name, as in “Logan's port”. The Historic Michigan Road runs through Logansport. Michigan Road was one of the first roads in Indiana. It runs from Madison, Indiana (South), to Michigan City, Indiana (North). There are many different names for the road, including Michigan Road, State Road 29, and US 421. Also several different passenger and freight train routes also served Logansport.

The Brotherhood of Railroad Trainmen and Ladies Auxiliary held its 1935 convention in Logansport. In addition to the Wabash, whose Wabash Cannon Ball stopped in the town, Pennsylvania Railroad trains such as the Union, on the Chicago-Cincinnati and the Chicago-Louisville routes, trains to Pittsburgh via Columbus, along with the Southland to Florida, made stops in Logansport. Logansport still has two active railroads and a switch yard, as well as a small refurbished depot downtown, although the much larger Pan Handle Depot was demolished in 1962.

Early in the 20th century, Logansport was home to the pioneering brass era automobile company Rutenber that had been based previously in Chicago and that renamed itself the Western Motor Company when it moved to Logansport. Edwin Rutenber started the Western Motor Company after inventing the first four-cylinder automobile engine. Rutenber was a prolific inventor who held dozens of patents ranging from the first automobile four-cylinder engine and distributor cap system to many electric home appliances, whose modern versions are still in use today. In 2024, the city was inundated with news articles about city resources being strained, as well as slowing down the local school system. These claims have been contested.

The Logansport Mall opened on East Market Street in October 1968. After becoming largely vacant, the property was acquired for redevelopment in 2020 and converted into an open-air commercial development known as The Junction.

=== Renewal ===
In 2009, Logansport was designated a Preserve America Community. This designation was bestowed upon Logansport by former First Lady Laura Bush, as one of her last unofficial duties before leaving the White House. Preserve America Executive Order Signed by President George W. Bush on March 3, 2003, Executive Order 13287, "Preserve America," complements the Preserve America initiative.

Preserve America Community designations are awarded to communities that:

- protect and celebrate their heritage;
- use their historic assets for economic development and community revitalization; and
- encourage people to experience and appreciate local historic resources through education and heritage tourism program.

Logan's Landing is a nonprofit economic development organization that focuses on the downtown of Logansport between the junction of the southernmost terminus of the Eel River as it joins the Wabash River. The City of Logansport Economic Development Organization is another nonprofit economic development organization that focuses on development outside of the downtown area, such as industrial parks, available commercial buildings other than downtown buildings, and other available undeveloped land. The Logansport – Cass County Chamber of Commerce is a forum for local business leadership, as an interface between businesses and the local community.

== Geography ==
According to the 2010 census, Logansport has a total area of 8.972 square miles (23.24 km^{2}), of which 8.75 square miles (22.66 km^{2}) (or 97.53%) is land and 0.222 square miles (0.57 km^{2}) (or 2.47%) is water.

The farmland to the south is generally flat, but there are some shallow hills to the north and east of Logansport that form a ridge through northern Cass and Miami counties. Similar nearby ridges—such as surrounding the nearby towns of Fowler and Goodland—have been found suitable for multi-hundred-megawatt wind farms, such as the nearby Fowler Ridge I & II Wind Farms and Goodland I Wind Farm.

=== Climate ===
Climate data for Logansport, Indiana (1991–2020 normals, extremes 1893–1918, 1990–present)
Month	Jan	Feb	Mar	Apr	May	Jun	Jul	Aug	Sep	Oct	Nov	Dec	Year
Record high °F (°C)	69 (21)	72 (22)	87 (31)	91 (33)	101 (38)	104 (40)	106 (41)	105 (41)	102 (39)	92 (33)	80 (27)	70 (21)	106 (41)
Mean maximum °F (°C)	55.1 (12.8)	57.6 (14.2)	70.4 (21.3)	79.3 (26.3)	87.3 (30.7)	92.6 (33.7)	93.4 (34.1)	92.1 (33.4)	90.4 (32.4)	81.9 (27.7)	68.3 (20.2)	57.7 (14.3)	95.4 (35.2)
Mean daily maximum °F (°C)	33.0 (0.6)	37.1 (2.8)	48.2 (9.0)	61.3 (16.3)	72.2 (22.3)	81.4 (27.4)	84.4 (29.1)	83.0 (28.3)	77.5 (25.3)	64.1 (17.8)	50.1 (10.1)	38.3 (3.5)	60.9 (16.1)
Daily mean °F (°C)	25.4 (−3.7)	28.7 (−1.8)	38.7 (3.7)	50.2 (10.1)	61.1 (16.2)	70.6 (21.4)	73.9 (23.3)	72.3 (22.4)	65.7 (18.7)	53.3 (11.8)	41.3 (5.2)	30.9 (−0.6)	51.0 (10.6)
Mean daily minimum °F (°C)	17.8 (−7.9)	20.3 (−6.5)	29.1 (−1.6)	39.1 (3.9)	50.0 (10.0)	59.8 (15.4)	63.4 (17.4)	61.6 (16.4)	54.0 (12.2)	42.5 (5.8)	32.4 (0.2)	23.6 (−4.7)	41.1 (5.1)
Mean minimum °F (°C)	−3.6 (−19.8)	1.8 (−16.8)	13.5 (−10.3)	25.7 (−3.5)	36.2 (2.3)	46.7 (8.2)	53.3 (11.8)	52.6 (11.4)	41.4 (5.2)	29.8 (−1.2)	19.7 (−6.8)	6.3 (−14.3)	−7.1 (−21.7)
Record low °F (°C)	−24 (−31)	−20 (−29)	−12 (−24)	7 (−14)	20 (−7)	30 (−1)	39 (4)	36 (2)	28 (−2)	16 (−9)	−2 (−19)	−20 (−29)	−24 (−31)
Average precipitation inches (mm)	2.63 (67)	2.02 (51)	2.69 (68)	3.77 (96)	4.35 (110)	4.77 (121)	4.78 (121)	4.36 (111)	3.27 (83)	3.02 (77)	3.13 (80)	2.51 (64)	41.30 (1,049)
Average snowfall inches (cm)	7.1 (18)	5.3 (13)	2.4 (6.1)	0.3 (0.76)	0.0 (0.0)	0.0 (0.0)	0.0 (0.0)	0.0 (0.0)	0.0 (0.0)	0.0 (0.0)	0.5 (1.3)	3.8 (9.7)	19.4 (49)
Average precipitation days (≥ 0.01 in)	11.5	9.5	10.5	11.9	13.1	11.4	10.2	9.4	8.3	10.3	10.5	11.2	127.8
Average snowy days (≥ 0.1 in)	5.4	5.4	1.6	0.2	0.0	0.0	0.0	0.0	0.0	0.0	0.4	3.4	16.4
Source: NOAA

== Demographics ==
Historical population
Census	Pop.	Note	%±
1850	2,251		—
1860	2,979		32.3%
1870	8,950		200.4%
1880	11,198		25.1%
1890	13,328		19.0%
1900	16,204		21.6%
1910	19,050		17.6%
1920	21,626		13.5%
1930	18,508		−14.4%
1940	20,177		9.0%
1950	21,031		4.2%
1960	21,106		0.4%
1970	19,255		−8.8%
1980	17,899		−7.0%
1990	16,812		−6.1%
2000	19,684		17.1%
2010	18,396		−6.5%
2020	18,366		−0.2%
Source: US Census Bureau

=== 2020 census ===
As of the 2020 census, Logansport had a population of 18,366. The median age was 36.5 years. 26.1% of residents were under the age of 18 and 15.9% of residents were 65 years of age or older. For every 100 females there were 96.2 males, and for every 100 females age 18 and over there were 93.6 males age 18 and over.

99.6% of residents lived in urban areas, while 0.4% lived in rural areas.

There were 7,022 households in Logansport, of which 32.7% had children under the age of 18 living in them. Of all households, 37.6% were married-couple households, 21.4% were households with a male householder and no spouse or partner present, and 32.1% were households with a female householder and no spouse or partner present. About 33.1% of all households were made up of individuals and 14.6% had someone living alone who was 65 years of age or older.

There were 7,868 housing units, of which 10.8% were vacant. The homeowner vacancy rate was 3.0% and the rental vacancy rate was 11.3%.

Racial composition as of the 2020 census
Race	Number	Percent
White	12,352	67.3%
Black or African American	498	2.7%
American Indian and Alaska Native	338	1.8%
Asian	382	2.1%
Native Hawaiian and Other Pacific Islander	4	0.0%
Some other race	2,905	15.8%
Two or more races	1,887	10.3%
Hispanic or Latino (of any race)	5,583	30.4%

=== 2010 census ===
As of the census of 2010, there were 18,396 people, 6,877 households, and 4,272 families residing in the city. The population density was 2,102.4 inhabitants per square mile (811.7/km^{2}). There were 7,822 housing units at an average density of 893.9 per square mile (345.1/km^{2}). The racial makeup of the city was 80.7% White, 2.3% African American, 0.8% Native American, 1.7% Asian, 0.1% Pacific Islander, 12.3% from other races, and 2.2% from two or more races. Hispanic or Latino of any race were 21.6% of the population.

There were 6,877 households, of which 34.6% had children under the age of 18 living with them, 40.6% were married couples living together, 15.4% had a female householder with no husband present, 6.1% had a male householder with no wife present, and 37.9% were non-families. 32.6% of all households were made up of individuals, and 13.9% had someone living alone who was 65 years of age or older. The average household size was 2.57 and the average family size was 3.26.

The median age in the city was 34.2 years. 27.8% of residents were under the age of 18; 9.5% were between the ages of 18 and 24; 26% were from 25 to 44; 22.8% were from 45 to 64; and 13.9% were 65 years of age or older. The gender makeup of the city was 49.3% male and 50.7% female.

=== 2000 census ===
As of the census of 2000, there were 19,684 people, 7,604 households, and 4,737 families residing in the city. The population density was 2,383.0 inhabitants per square mile (920.1/km^{2}). There were 8,026 housing units at an average density of 971.6 per square mile (375.1/km^{2}). The racial makeup of the city was 89.79% White, 2.08% African American, 0.37% Native American, 0.90% Asian, 0.06% Pacific Islander, 5.63% from other races, and 1.18% from two or more races. Hispanic or Latino of any race were 12.58% of the population.

There were 7,604 households, out of which 30.2% had children under the age of 18 living with them, 44.8% were married couples living together, 12.4% had a female householder with no husband present, and 37.7% were non-families. 31.6% of all households were made up of individuals, and 14.8% had someone living alone who was 65 years of age or older. The average household size was 2.47 and the average family size was 3.06.

In the city, the population was spread out, with 25.7% under the age of 18, 10.3% from 18 to 24, 29.4% from 25 to 44, 19.4% from 45 to 64, and 15.2% who were 65 years of age or older. The median age was 34 years. For every 100 females, there were 100.7 males. For every 100 females age 18 and over, there were 95.2 males.

The median income for a household in the city was $33,483, and the median income for a family was $40,497. Males had a median income of $28,785 versus $21,660 for females. The per capita income for the city was $17,085. About 6.4% of families and 10.1% of the population were below the poverty line, including 14.4% of those under age 18 and 4.8% of those age 65 or over.

== Culture ==
Logansport is home to the McHale Performing Arts Center, adjacent to Logansport High School. McHale PAC plays host to the annual Winter Fantasy Production, as sponsored by a union of the organizations in the Logansport High School Performing Arts Department. These musicals are held every year during the last weekend prior to the Thanksgiving holiday. The facility also holds the rest of the department's annual events, including the LHS Tony Awards, SNL, the All School Production and various music department concerts. Out-of-town live soloists and troupes also put on several live-performance shows per year at McHale. As a modern facility for the performing arts, Loganport's McHale is comparable to similar-sized venues in similar-sized towns and cities throughout the Great Lakes region, such as the Honeywell Center in Wabash, Indiana, The Tibbits Opera House in Coldwater, Michigan, The Croswell Opera House in Adrian, Michigan, The Opera House of Sandwich in Sandwich, Illinois, The Round Barn Theatre in Nappanee, Indiana, and the Williams Theatre on the campus of Purdue-Fort Wayne in Fort Wayne. The loaning of the facility's equipment is in high demand by many amateur as well as professional venues throughout the state.

Logansport also has the oldest art organization in Indiana. The Logansport Art Association (LAA) was founded in February 1911. What began as a Neighborhood Art Club in 1894, is now an art center that offers art classes, show opportunities, art supplies, and special events. The LAA holds annual fine art competitions and shows that draw local and statewide artists. This includes the Black & White Show in February, Youth Art Shows in March and April, Fine Arts Show in May and June, a Photography Competition in October, and their Members Invitational in November.

Logansport hosts an annual arts festival Art on the Avenue, every September, which is the largest art festival in the region. Many of the area's festivals and events are held at Little Turtle Waterway. Little Turtle Waterway is an architect-designed public space and trail system along the Wabash River in downtown Logansport. Logansport also hosts the annual Med Flory Jazz Festival every spring in downtown Logansport. Med Flory is a well-known jazz musician and actor from Logansport. Until recent years, to honor its railroad history, Logansport held its annual Iron Horse Festival. When many of the trains were taken out of the area, the festival had turned into a Heritage Festival, but then eventually canceled. Other annual festivals in Logansport include:

- Throughout the summer month, every Sunday evening enjoy live music at Little Turtle Waterway
- The Med Flory Jazz and Blues Fest, held in July presented by the Cass County Arts Alliance
- the Taste Of Cass County held every August in downtown Logansport presented by Logan's Landing
- Art of and Avenue is held the 2nd Saturday of September presented by the Cass County Arts Alliance
- Downtown Spooktacular held in October for the Halloween Festivities
- Light up Logansport & Downtown Christmas Open House, held the Friday evening after Thanksgiving to usher in the Christmas season

== Education ==
Logansport Community School Corporation serves the majority of city of Logansport and surrounding area. With an enrollment of over 4,500, the corporation utilizes 8 different buildings:

- Columbia Elementary School
- Fairview Elementary School
- Landis Elementary School
- Franklin Elementary School
- Logansport Intermediate School (grades 5–6)
- Logansport Junior High School (grades 7–8)
- Logansport High School
- Century Career Center

Despite also having Felix the Cat as their official mascot (which is considered as Indiana's oldest recognized mascot) and de facto logo throughout academic and athletic programs, the moniker of Logansport High School's athletic teams is the Berries, which is a pun on the city's name vis a vis the loganberry hybrid of a blackberry and a red raspberry. The basketball gymnasium at Logansport High School furthers the pun by being officially named the Berry Bowl. The Berry Bowl is connected through the school to the McHale Performing Arts Center which overlooks the adjacent courtyard and entrance hall.

A portion of the city in the southeast is in Lewis Cass Schools.

The town is home to two institutions of higher learning, a regional campus of Indiana's Ivy Tech community college that offers associates, and certification, as well as a satellite campus of Trine University offering associates, bachelors, and master's degrees.

Logansport has a public library, a branch of the Cass County Public Library.

== Employers ==
According to the website "Indiana's Technology Corridor" the largest employers in the Logansport/Cass County area are:

#	Employer	Industry	# of Employees
1	Tyson Foods, Inc.	Pork Processing	2,000
2	Logansport Community School Corp	Education	828
3	Memorial Hospital	Healthcare	628
4	Logansport State Hospital	Psychiatric Healthcare	622
5	Memorial Hospital Outpatient	Healthcare	600
6	Materials Processing, Inc.	Metal Parts	300
7	Dilling Mechanical Contractor, Inc.	Mechanical Contracting	275
8	Walmart	Retail	270
9	Carter Fuel Systems LLC	Fuel Pumps	230
10	A Raymond Tinnerman Mfg	Plating and Polishing	230
11	Four County Counseling Ctr	Psychiatric Healthcare	215
12	Southeastern School Corp Admin	Education	209
13	Small Parts Inc	Metal Parts	204
14	Compal USA, Inc.	Printed Circuit Board	174
15	Matthew-Warren Inc	Spring Manufacturer	167
16	Peak Community Svc., Inc.	Disability Services	150
17	Pioneer Regional School Corp	Education	135
18	Kaiser's Contract Cleaning	Cleaning services	120
19	Chase Nursing & Rehab Center	Healthcare	118
20	The Andersons, Inc.	Grain elevator	115
21	Area Five Agency on Aging	Community Action Agency	110
22	Home Depot	Retail	105
23	Pharos Tribune	Newspaper Publishing	100
24	Pepsi Bottling Group	Soft Drink Packaging	100
25	Martin's	Retail	95

== Transportation ==
Logansport is served by US 35, running northwest–southeast through the town. US 24's business route runs east–west through town. Indiana State Road 25 runs northeast–southwest through Logansport.

The town had been a crossroads of east–west trains of the Wabash Railroad between St. Louis and Detroit and Pennsylvania Railroad trains running northwest–southeast between Chicago and Cincinnati. Serving the town were a Wabash station, a main Pennsylvania RR station and an auxiliary PRR Logansport station called Van Station. The last train on the Wabash line was the Wabash Cannon Ball in 1971. The Penn Central ran the last Chicago-Cincinnati train through Logansport, an unnamed successor to the Buckeye night train, in 1969. The Penn Central South Wind pooled with other companies ran south to Florida up to 1971. A day train counterpart to the Buckeye lingered on at least another year.

The nearest airport to Logansport with commercial service is Fort Wayne International Airport (FWA).

Cass Area Transit provides demand-response and deviated fixed-route bus service in the city.

== Sports ==
The Logansport Iron Horses of The Basketball League (TBL) have played at Logansport High School since 2025.

== In popular culture ==
The central premise of One Day at a Time, the American 1975-1984 television series, is that the lead characters left Logansport for a better life in Indianapolis.

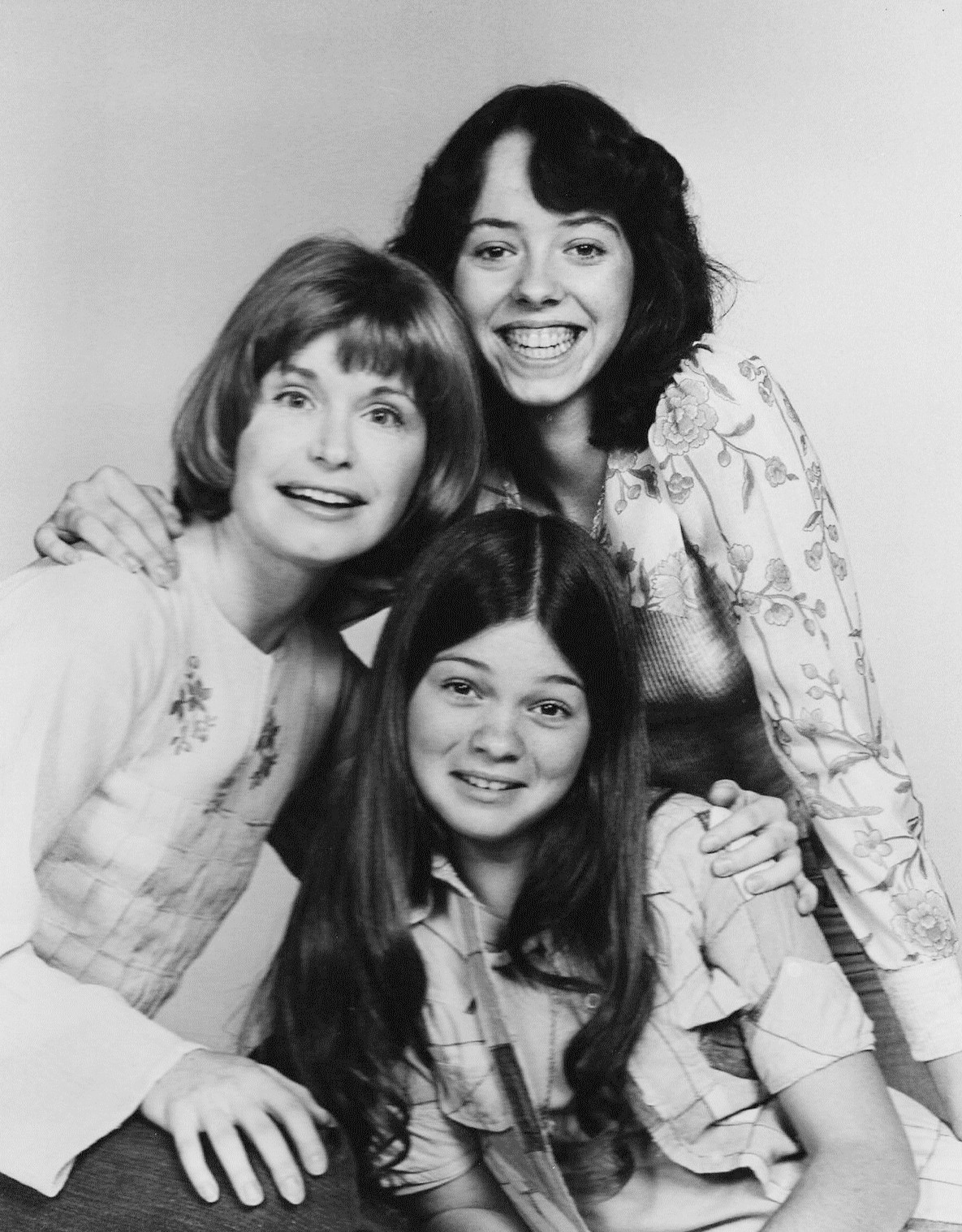
Bonnie Franklin, Mackenzie Phillips, and Valerie Bertinelli, the three characters that move from Logansport in 1975.

A localized editions of Monopoly, Loganopoly, was issued.

== Notable people ==
- Phyllis A. Balch, nutritionist and writer
- Myra Biggerstaff, artist
- Dai Buell, pianist, raised in Logansport
- Samuel P. Bush, patriarch of the Bush political family, worked here as a railroad mechanic
- Nate Champion, men's basketball head coach of Le Moyne Dolphins
- John B. Chase, Wisconsin state senator
- Ann Christy, actress
- Gary Colson, college basketball coach
- Red Corriden, MLB infielder, 1950 manager of Chicago White Sox
- George Cuppy, baseball pitcher
- Michael Fansler, Justice of the Indiana Supreme Court
- Graham N. Fitch, Indiana pioneer senator; Union Army officer during the Civil War; half-brother of LeRoy
- LeRoy Fitch, United States Naval officer during the Civil War; half-brother of Graham
- Helen Thornton Geer, author; Professor of Library Science; granddaughter of Henry Clay Thornton
- Isaac Wheeler Geer, prominent railroad executive; father of Helen T. Geer
- Edna Goodrich, Broadway and silent screen star; married to comedian Nat Goodwin; member of Thornton family
- Arthur Martin Graffis, interim president, Elcar Automotive; member, Thornton family
- Herb Graffis, writer, member of World Golf Hall of Fame
- Charles Vernon Gridley, US Navy officer during the American Civil War and the Spanish–American War
- Aaron Heilman, professional baseball pitcher.
- Joe Higgins, American commercial, film and television actor.
- Tony Hinkle, Basketball Hall of Fame player and coach, inventor of orange basketball; Hinkle Fieldhouse named for him
- Clara Ingram Judson, children's author
- R.W. Julian, Numismatist, researcher and author
- Maibelle Heikes Justice, American novelist and screenwriter
- Greg Kinnear, Oscar-nominated actor
- Moses Lairy, Justice of the Indiana Supreme Court
- Kenesaw Mountain Landis, brother of Charles B. Landis and Frederick Landis, a federal judge and first Commissioner of Baseball, grew up in Logansport, where at 17 he played on and managed the Logansport High School baseball team
- Charles B. Landis, brother of Kenesaw Mountain Landis and Frederick Landis, editor of Logansport Journal (1883–1887), U.S. Representative from Indiana (1897–1909)
- Frederick Landis, brother of Kenesaw Mountain Landis and Charles B. Landis, U.S. Representative from Indiana (1903–1907), organizer of the Progressive Party (United States, 1912).
- David Myers, Justice of the Indiana Supreme Court
- Boston Reid, racing driver
- Doel Reed (1894–1985) painter, printmaker, and educator
- Edwin Rutenber, inventor of the first 4-cylinder automobile engine
- Sir Henry Worth Thornton, President, Canadian National Railways; Vanderbilt football coach
- James Johnston Thornton, federal judge during Reconstruction
- William Patton Thornton, Ohio physician, politician
- William Wheeler Thornton, Deputy Attorney General, State Supreme Court Librarian, author
- John Tipton, United States Senator (1832–1839)
- Tutt Brothers, African American acting/performing duo
- James Calvin Wilsey, guitarist
- George Winter, pioneer artist
- Jamie Young, NBA Coach for the Boston Celtics (2000–2021) and Philadelphia Sixers (2021–2023)
- Merle Nethercutt Norman, Cosmetics magnate, chemist, and philanthropist
- Vincent Bendix, The Bendix Company manufactured the Bendix automobile in Logansport, Indiana from 1908 until 1909
- Meredith Irwin "Med" Flory, American jazz saxophonist, bandleader, and actor
- Charles Pratt Huntington, American architect
- Ted Shultz, A college football player and coach
- Greg Bell (long jumper), American track and field athlete who won the gold medal in the long jump at the 1956 Summer Olympics in Melbourne, Australia
- Stew Hofferth, American professional baseball player
- Red Smith (catcher), American catcher in Major League Baseball
- Gary "Jimbo" McCready, mascot for the videogame Balatro.
