= Thornton Township, Nebraska =

Thornton Township
- Township
- Location in Buffalo County
- Coordinates: 40°49′32″N 099°00′42″W
- Country: United States
- State: Nebraska
- County: Buffalo

Area
  - Total: 36.16 sq mi (93.65 km^{2})
  - Land: 36.16 sq mi (93.65 km^{2})
  - Water: 0 sq mi (0 km^{2}) 0%
- Elevation: 2,195 ft (669 m)

Population (2000)
  - Total: 181
  - Density: 4.9/sq mi (1.9/km^{2})
- GNIS feature ID: 0838283

Thornton Township is one of twenty-six townships in Buffalo County, Nebraska, United States. The population was 181 at the 2000 census. A 2006 estimate placed the township's population at 178. In 1883 the Buffalo County Board of Directors named the township for Samuel W. Thornton, a local politician, farmer, and Civil War soldier.

== See also ==
- County government in Nebraska
