= Pollard-Nelson House =

Historic house in Indiana, United States

- U.S. National Register of Historic Places
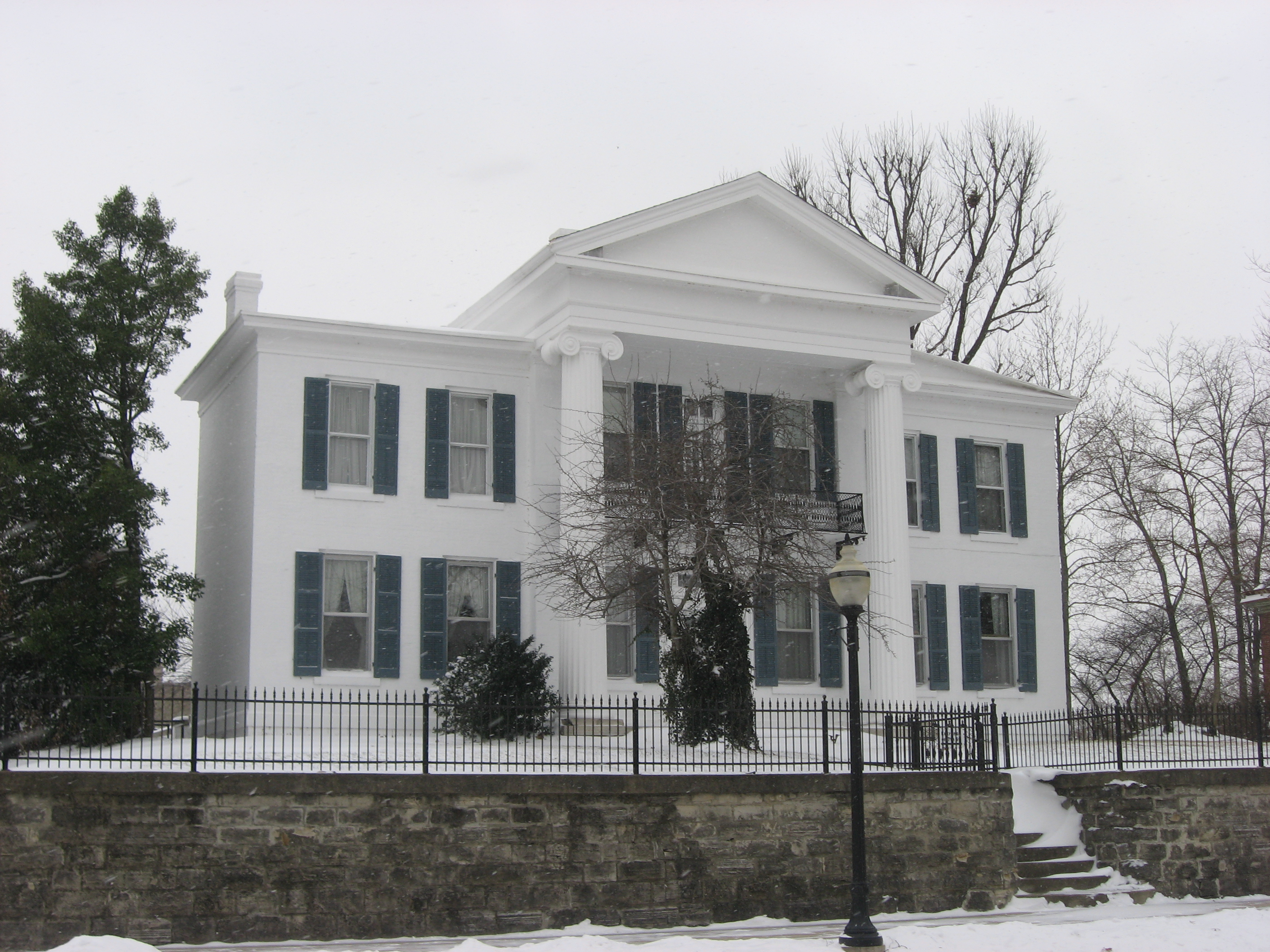
- Pollard-Nelson House, January 2012

- Location within Cass County, Indiana Location within Indiana Location within the United States
- Location: 7th and Market Sts., Logansport, Indiana
- Coordinates: 40°45′12″N 86°21′40″W
- Area: less than one acre
- Built: 1845, 1889, 1910
- Architectural style: Greek Revival
- NRHP reference No.: 75000042
- Added to NRHP: October 29, 1975

The Pollard-Nelson House is a historic home in Logansport, Indiana. It was built in 1845 and enlarged in 1889 and 1910. It is a two-story, seven-bay, Greek Revival style brick dwelling with flanking two-story wings and rear additions. It has a gable roof and features a two-story, projecting front portico supported by Doric order columns.

It was listed on the National Register of Historic Places in 1975.
