= Henry Tousley House =

Historic house in Indiana, United States

- U.S. National Register of Historic Places
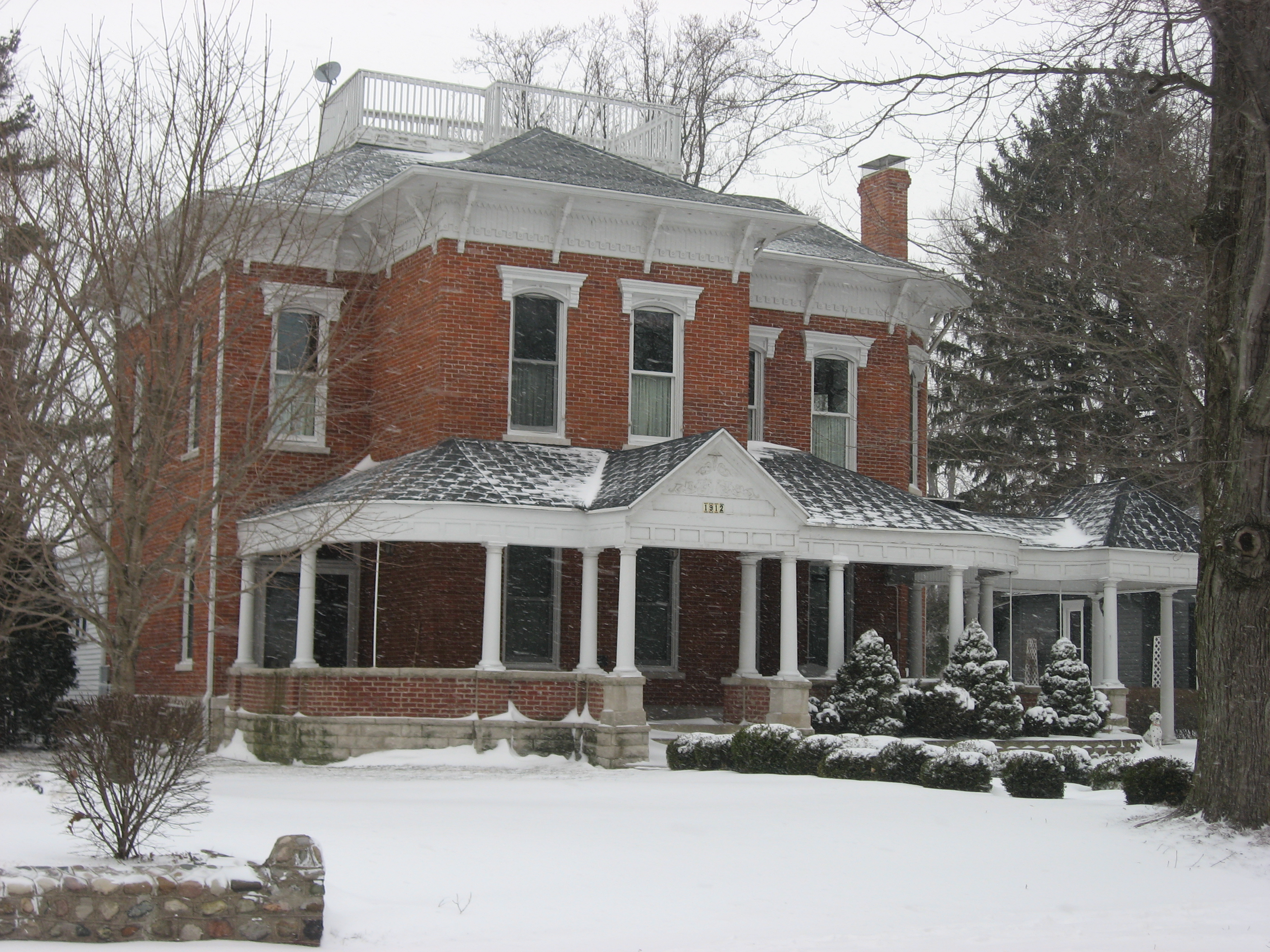
- Henry Tousley House, January 2012

- Location within Cass County, Indiana Location within Indiana Location within the United States
- Location: 1912 High St., Logansport, Indiana
- Coordinates: 40°45′37″N 86°20′42″W
- Area: less than one acre
- Built: 1885, c. 1910
- Built by: Midland and Barnes Construction Co.
- Architectural style: Italianate
- NRHP reference No.: 02001167
- Added to NRHP: October 15, 2002

Henry Tousley House is a historic home located at Logansport, Indiana. It was built in 1885, and is a two-story, late Italianate style brick dwelling with Eastlake movement decorative elements. It has an asymmetrical plan, a central hip roofed section with a projecting front wing, and one-story front porch added about 1910.

Henry Tousley was employed as a railroad official. The home was listed on the National Register of Historic Places in 2002.
