= William H. Ferguson House =

- U.S. National Register of Historic Places
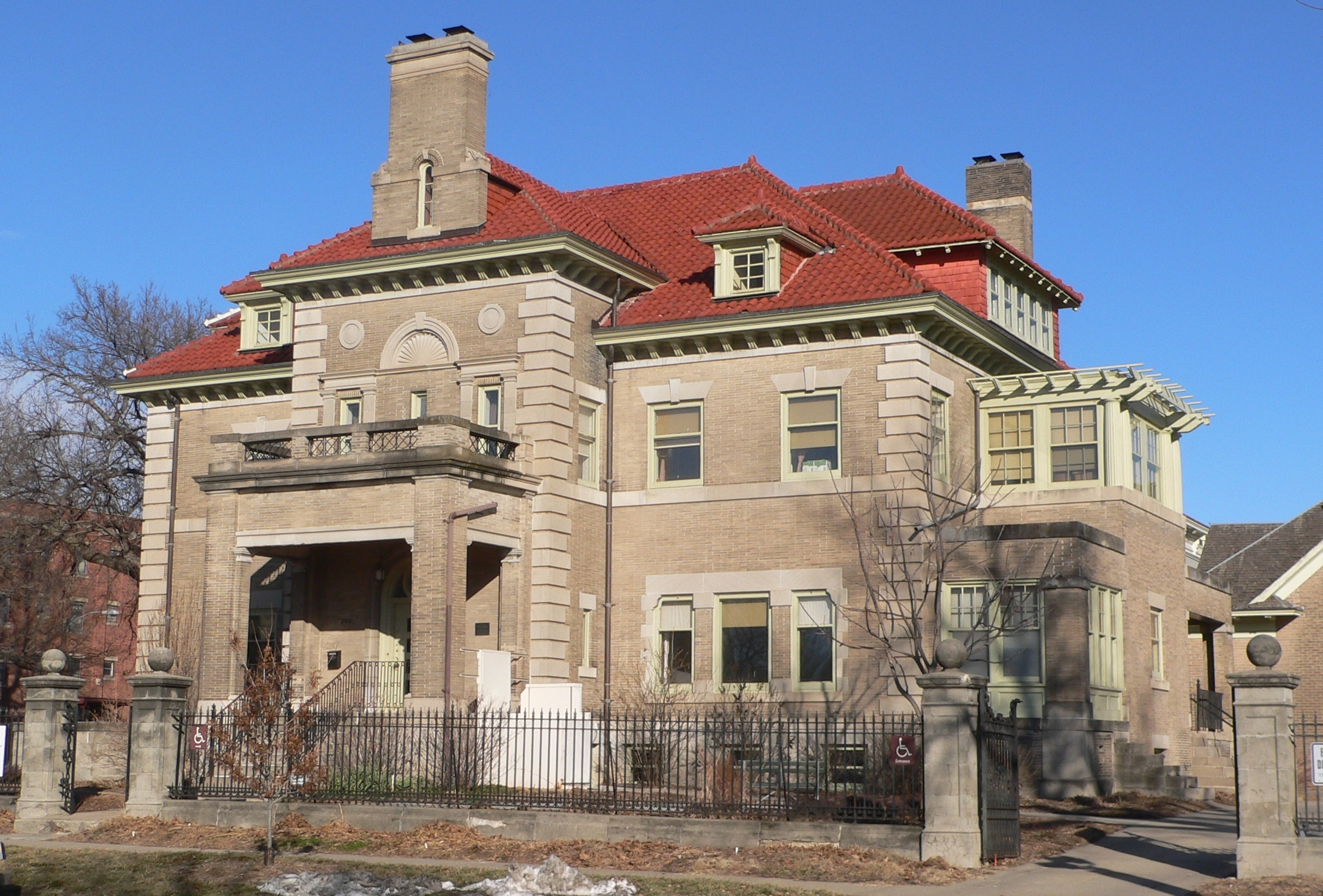
- The house in 2012

- Location within Nebraska Location within the United States
- Location: 700 South 16th Street, Lincoln, Nebraska
- Coordinates: 40°48′24″N 96°41′51″W
- Area: 0 acres (0 ha)
- Built: 1906
- Architectural style: Renaissance Revival
- NRHP reference No.: 72000755
- Added to NRHP: November 29, 1972

The William H. Ferguson House is a historic two-and-a-half-story house in Lincoln, Nebraska. It was built in 1906-1907 for William H. Ferguson, a landholder, merchant and business owner who died in 1937. It was designed in the Renaissance Revival style. It has been listed on the National Register of Historic Places since November 29, 1972.
