= Michael Case Kissel =

American music producer and engineer

- Born: 1948
- Died: 2009 (aged 60–61)
- Occupations: music Producer and Songwriter
- Organization: KMA Music
- Notable work: Arnold Schwarzenegger's Total Body Workout, Feeling Alright

Michael Case Kissel (1948–2009) was an American music producer and engineer notable for working with Arnold Schwarzenegger on his Total Body Workout, as well as projects with Ringo Starr, Sting, Parliament-Funkadelic, David Bowie, Rod Stewart, the Pointer Sisters, Sean Paul, the Backstreet Boys, the Four Tops, Nas and Los Lobos, among many others.

== Background ==
A producer and songwriter, Kissel was known for working with many other artists, signed and unsigned; Kissel also founded KMA Music (kmamusic.com), a Francis Manzella-designed mixing and tracking facility in the Brill Building, located in New York City's Times Square.

Kissel's work in movies and recordings has put him in the music business trenches with Sting, Kurt Vonnegut, Rock 'n' Roll Hall of Famer Dave Mason (Traffic, Jimi Hendrix, and Fleetwood Mac, as well as his own catalog of hits, including "Feeling Alright") and drummer Babatunde Olatunji (known as The Father of African Music, "Baba" wrote and performed with Santana and the Grateful Dead, taught African culture to Malcolm X, marched with Martin Luther King, Jr., and performed at JFK's inauguration). Working with Olatunji completed a circle, as both Olatunji and Kissel were discovered by John Hammond, the A&R man who found and produced Billie Holiday, Aretha Franklin, Bob Dylan, George Benson, Bruce Springsteen, Leonard Cohen, and Stevie Ray Vaughan. He has his own work listed in the album Steal this Disc by Ryco records.

Kissel's later projects included writing songs with Jimmy Norman (Jimmy wrote the Rolling Stones classic "Time Is on My Side", and worked extensively with Bob Marley and Jimi Hendrix), Teddy Richards (Richards, son of Aretha Franklin and songwriter Ted White, has performed with Joe Cocker, Al Green, and Kid Rock, as well as Aretha, in between writing and producing his own albums), Sean Harkness (guitarist Harkness has been a solo artist on Windham Hill, and is a sought-after session player and music director), and BananaToons/EMI writing team Sean Hosein & Dane Deviller (Jessica Simpson, Kelly Rowland, Color Me Badd, 98 Degrees, Amy Grant).

== Death ==
Michael Kissel died in early May 2009 due to a rare form of brain cancer known as glioblastoma multiforme.

== Notable work ==
- Arnold Schwarzenegger Arnold Schwarzenegger's Total Body Workout (1983)
