= Josephus Atkinson Farm =

- U.S. National Register of Historic Places
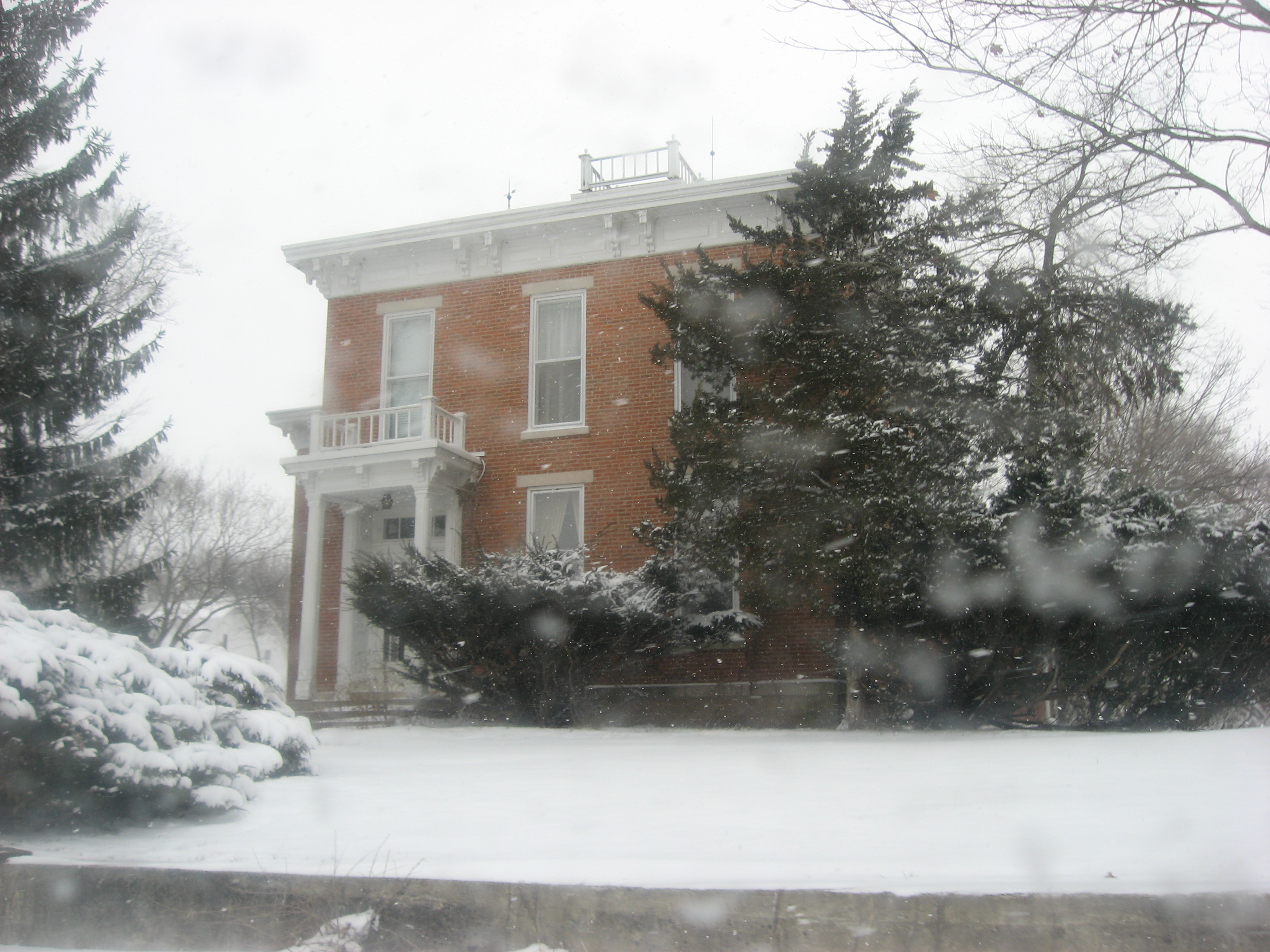
- Josephus Atkinson Farmhouse, January 2012

- Location within Cass County, Indiana Location within Indiana Location within the United States
- Location: 4474 W. 400S, west of Clymers, Clinton Township, Cass County, Indiana
- Coordinates: 40°42′24″N 86°27′29″W
- Area: 5 acres (2.0 ha)
- Built: c. 1865
- Architectural style: Italianate
- NRHP reference No.: 10000373
- Added to NRHP: June 24, 2010

Josephus Atkinson Farm, also known as the Charles D. Wellington Farm, is a historic home and farm located in Clinton Township, Cass County, Indiana. The house was built about 1865, and is a two-story, three bay Italianate style brick dwelling. It has a hipped roof and 1 1/2-story gabled ell. Also on the property are the contributing drive-through corn crib (c. 1910), two large barns (c. 1910), garage (c. 1920), and storage shed (c. 1920).

It was listed on the National Register of Historic Places in 2010.
