= Willard B. Place House =

Historic house in Indiana, United States

- U.S. National Register of Historic Places
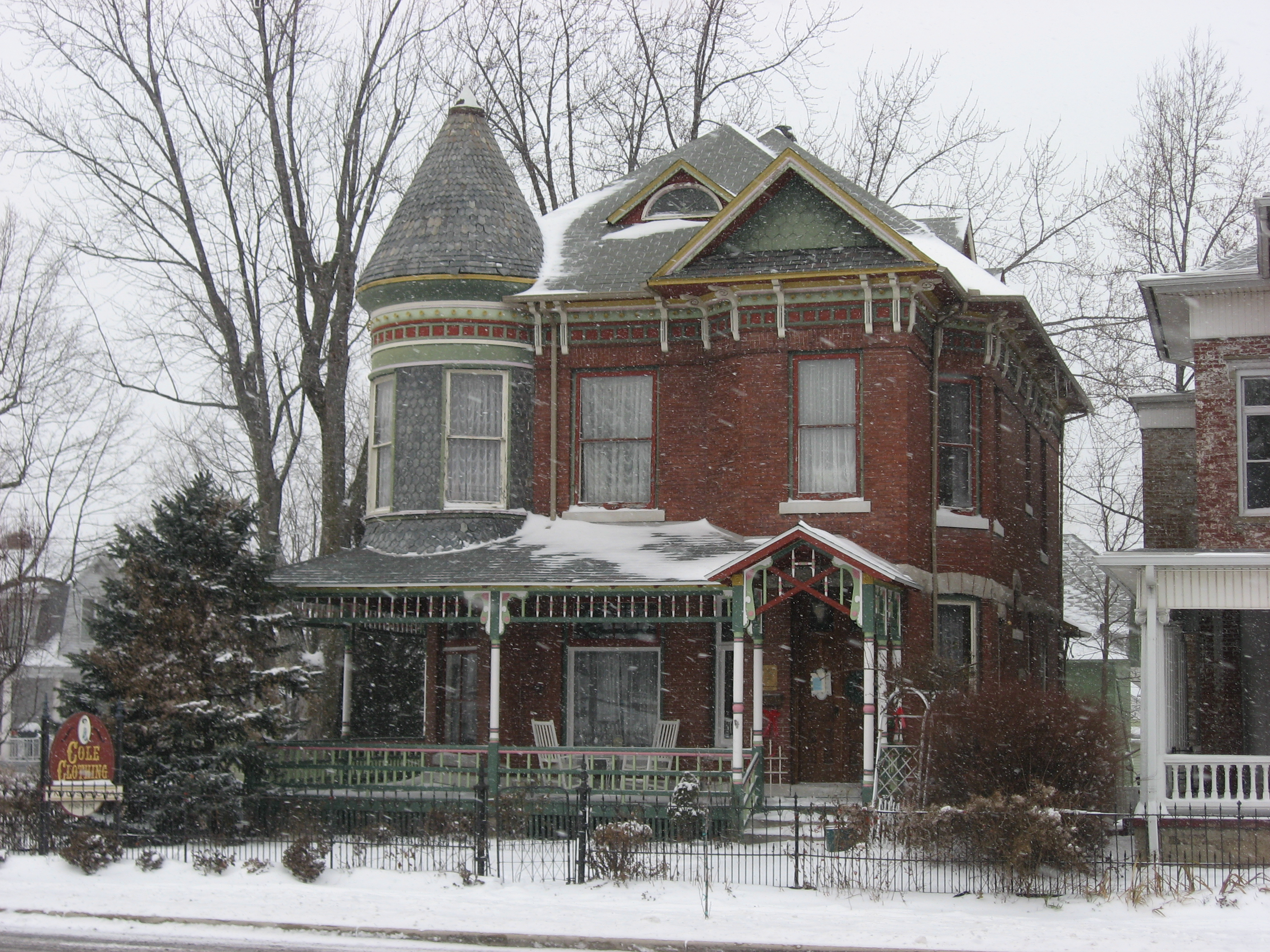
- Willard B. Place House, January 2012

- Location within Cass County, Indiana Location within Indiana Location within the United States
- Location: 900 E. Broadway, Logansport, Indiana
- Coordinates: 40°45′19″N 86°21′30″W
- Area: less than one acre
- Built: c. 1889
- Architectural style: Queen Anne
- NRHP reference No.: 98001050
- Added to NRHP: August 14, 1998

Willard B. Place House is a historic home located at Logansport, Indiana. It was built about 1889, and is a 2 1/2-story, Queen Anne style brick dwelling. It has a hipped roof with multiple cross gables, a conical roofed corner turret, and one-story wraparound porch. Also on the property are an attached garage (c. 1920), carriage house (c. 1889), and brick wall.

It was listed on the National Register of Historic Places in 1998.
