= Jerolaman-Long House =

Historic house in Indiana, United States

- U.S. National Register of Historic Places
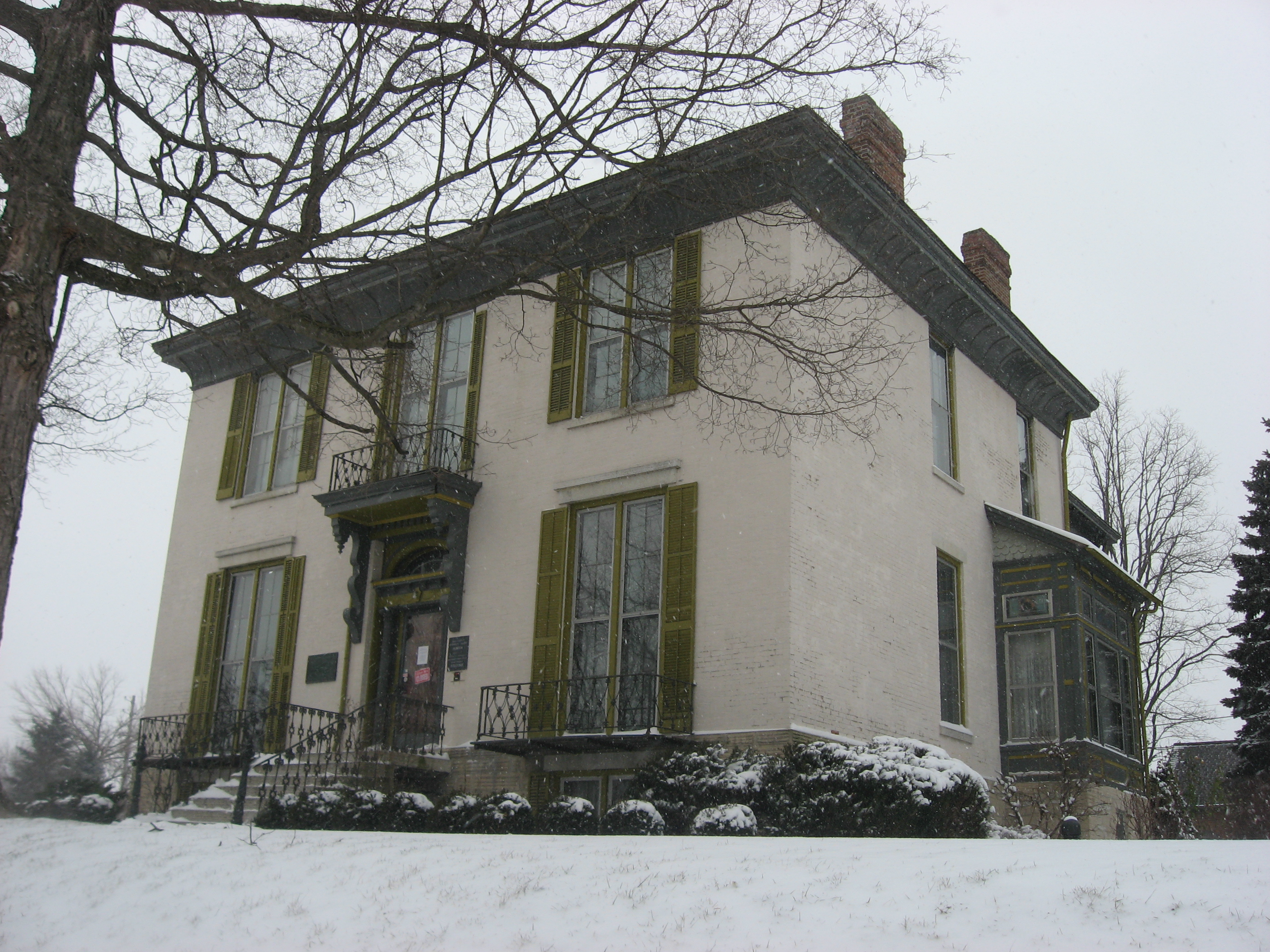
- Jerolaman-Long House, January 2012

- Location within Cass County, Indiana Location within Indiana Location within the United States
- Location: 1004 E. Market St., Logansport, Indiana
- Coordinates: 40°45′17″N 86°21′20″W
- Area: 0.3 acres (0.12 ha)
- Built: 1853, 1890
- Built by: Bevan, George
- Architectural style: Italianate
- NRHP reference No.: 85000651
- Added to NRHP: March 28, 1985

Jerolaman-Long House, also known as the Long Home Museum & Cabin, is a historic home located at 1004 E. Market Street, Logansport, Indiana. It was built about 1853, and is a two-story, three-bay, Italianate style brick dwelling. It has a two-story brick rear ell added about 1890. Both sections have low hipped roofs and sit on raised ashlar foundations. The building has housed a Cass County Historical Society Museum since 1963.

It was listed on the National Register of Historic Places in 1985.
