= Ferguson House (Logansport, Indiana) =

Historic house in Indiana, United States

- U.S. National Register of Historic Places
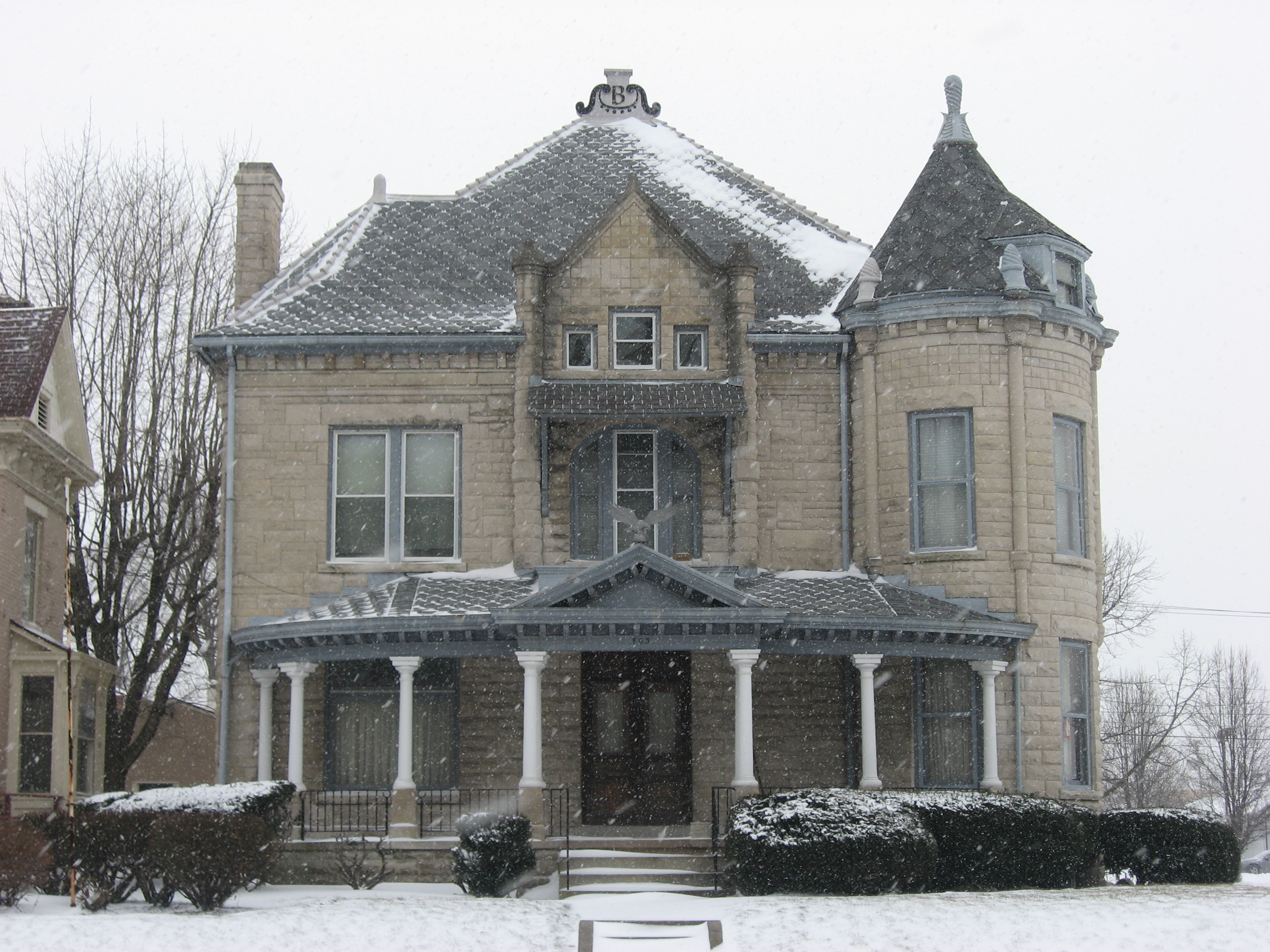
- Ferguson House, January 2012

- Location within Cass County, Indiana Location within Indiana Location within the United States
- Location: 803 E. Broadway, Logansport, Indiana
- Coordinates: 40°45′18″N 86°21′35″W
- Area: less than one acre
- Built: c. 1895
- Architectural style: Romanesque
- NRHP reference No.: 83000117
- Added to NRHP: June 30, 1983

Ferguson House, also known as the Dr. Robert A. Brewer House, is a historic home located at Logansport, Indiana. It was erected about 1895, and is a three-story, Romanesque Revival style brick dwelling sheathed in Indiana limestone. It features projecting bays and a 2 1/2-story round tower with conical roof, a one-story porch supported by Doric order columns, and a steeply pitched roof.

It was listed on the National Register of Historic Places in 1983.
