= Courthouse Historic District (Logansport, Indiana) =

Historic district in Indiana, United States

- U.S. National Register of Historic Places
- U.S. Historic district
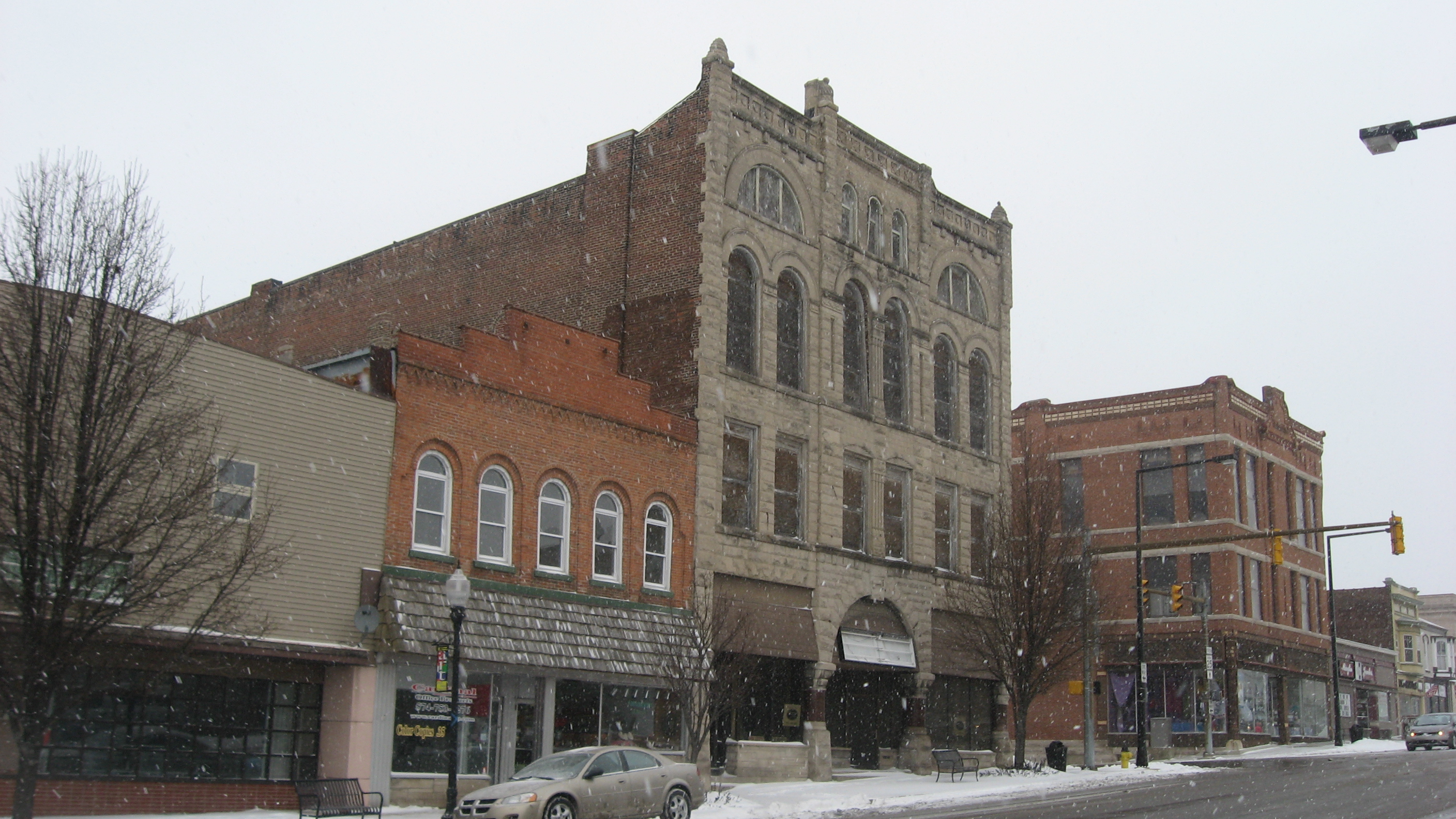
- Four buildings on Broadway, January 2012

- Location within Cass County, Indiana Location within Indiana Location within the United States
- Location: Roughly between Third and Sixth Sts., E. Melbourne Ave. and High St., Logansport, Indiana
- Coordinates: 40°45′14″N 86°21′53″W
- Area: 55 acres (22 ha)
- Built by: Barnes, James I.
- Architect: Crain, J.E.
- Architectural style: Late Victorian, Late 19th And 20th Century Revivals
- NRHP reference No.: 99000294
- Added to NRHP: March 12, 1999

Courthouse Historic District is a national historic district located at Logansport, Indiana. The district encompasses 79 contributing buildings and one contributing site in the central business district of Logansport. It has a mix of institutional, governmental, and commercial buildings and notable examples of Late Victorian and Romanesque Revival style architecture. Notable contributing resources include the Masonic Hall (1896), Elks Lodge No. 66 (1907), Douglass Building (c. 1915), McCaffey Building (c. 1880), Logansport-Cass County Public Library (1942), The State Theater (c. 1930), United States Post Office (1925), Bank Building (c. 1870), and Watts Building (1901).

It was listed on the National Register of Historic Places in 1999.
