= Point Historic District (Logansport, Indiana) =

Historic district in Indiana, United States

- U.S. National Register of Historic Places
- U.S. Historic district
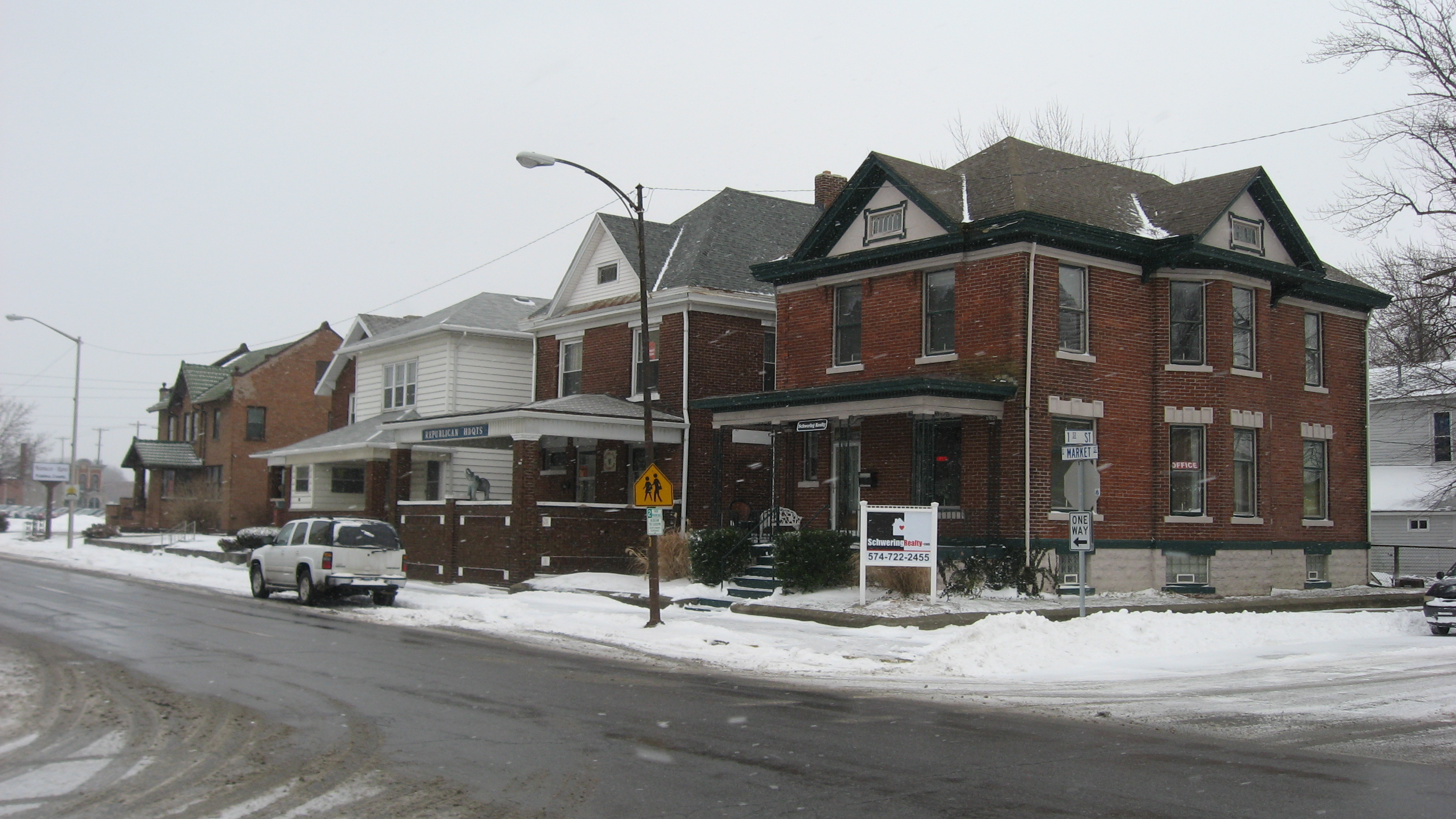
- Houses in the Point Historic District, January 2012

- Location within Cass County, Indiana Location within Indiana Location within the United States
- Location: Roughly bet. Eel River Ave., Third St., and E. Melbourne Ave., Logansport, Indiana
- Coordinates: 40°45′09″N 86°22′07″W
- Area: 19 acres (7.7 ha)
- Built by: Barnes, J. I.
- Architectural style: Queen Anne, Colonial Revival, et al.
- NRHP reference No.: 99001150
- Added to NRHP: September 17, 1999

Point Historic District is a national historic district located at Logansport, Indiana. The district encompasses 34 contributing buildings, 2 contributing sites, and 1 contributing structure in the heart of the oldest section of Logansport. It has a mix of residential and commercial buildings and notable examples of Queen Anne and Colonial Revival style residential architecture. Notable contributing resources include the Urban Point Park (c. 1940), Firestone Station (1928), All Saints Rectory (c. 1925), St. Joseph's (now All Saints) Roman Catholic Church (1884), Geiger Building (1889), and St. Luke's English Evangelical Lutheran Church (1908).

It was listed on the National Register of Historic Places in 1999.
