= William Wheeler Thornton =

American lawyer and judge in Indiana (1851–1932)

William Wheeler Thornton (June 27, 1851 – January 31, 1932) was an American lawyer, Attorney General, judge, and author. He was born in Logansport, Indiana, to John Allen and Elizabeth B. Thomas Thornton, members of respectable farming families. After attending Smithson College, a Universalist educational center, William became interested in law, entering the University of Michigan in 1875. He graduated in 1876 (LL.B). Upon returning to Logansport, Indiana, William Thornton worked in the law office of his uncle, Henry Clay Thornton, a prominent lawyer and father of Sir Henry Worth Thornton.

From 1879 to 1889, he alternated private practice with civic positions, including Crawfordsville, Indiana city attorney and Deputy Attorney General of Indiana (1880–1883). From 1889 to 1893, William W. Thornton served as Librarian of the Indiana Supreme Court. After two more decades of private practice, William Thornton became judge of the Superior Court of Marion County, Indiana (Nov. 20, 1914), serving until his death on January 31, 1932.

William W. Thornton also taught law at the Benjamin Harrison Law School, serving as Dean until his death. The school is now Indiana University School of Law- Indianapolis.

== Publications ==
William Wheeler Thornton was one of the foremost authors on Indianan jurisprudence. In Indiana and Indianans: A History of Aboriginal and Territorial Indiana and the Century of Statehood, the author made the following claim:

At one time it was claimed for Judge Thornton that he had written more articles for legal periodicals than any other one man in America or England except only two (pg. 1620).

The citation continued to list writings on myriad topics: municipal and school law; railroad law; estates, gifts, and advancement law; and several biographies, including one for prominent lawyer and judge, Isaac Newton Blackford. Many of William W. Thornton's writings are still read and studied today. The William Wheeler Thornton Papers are held at the Manuscript Division, Indiana Division, Indiana State Library .

== Family ==
On January 25, 1882, William married Mary F. Groves, who died July 22, 1905. He then married Irene F. Blackledge on July 20, 1911. William was a nephew of prominent physician William Patton Thornton and educator Joseph L. Thornton.

At the time of William's death, he had a half-brother, John Lambert Thornton, who lived in Los Angeles, California, with his wife, Emma Gay Shouf Thornton, and son, Raymond Allen Thornton. Raymond would later serve in World War II, Korea, and Vietnam, rising to Lieutenant Colonel of the US Air Force.
