= Henry Worth Thornton =

American railway executive (1871–1933)

Sir Henry Worth Thornton KBE
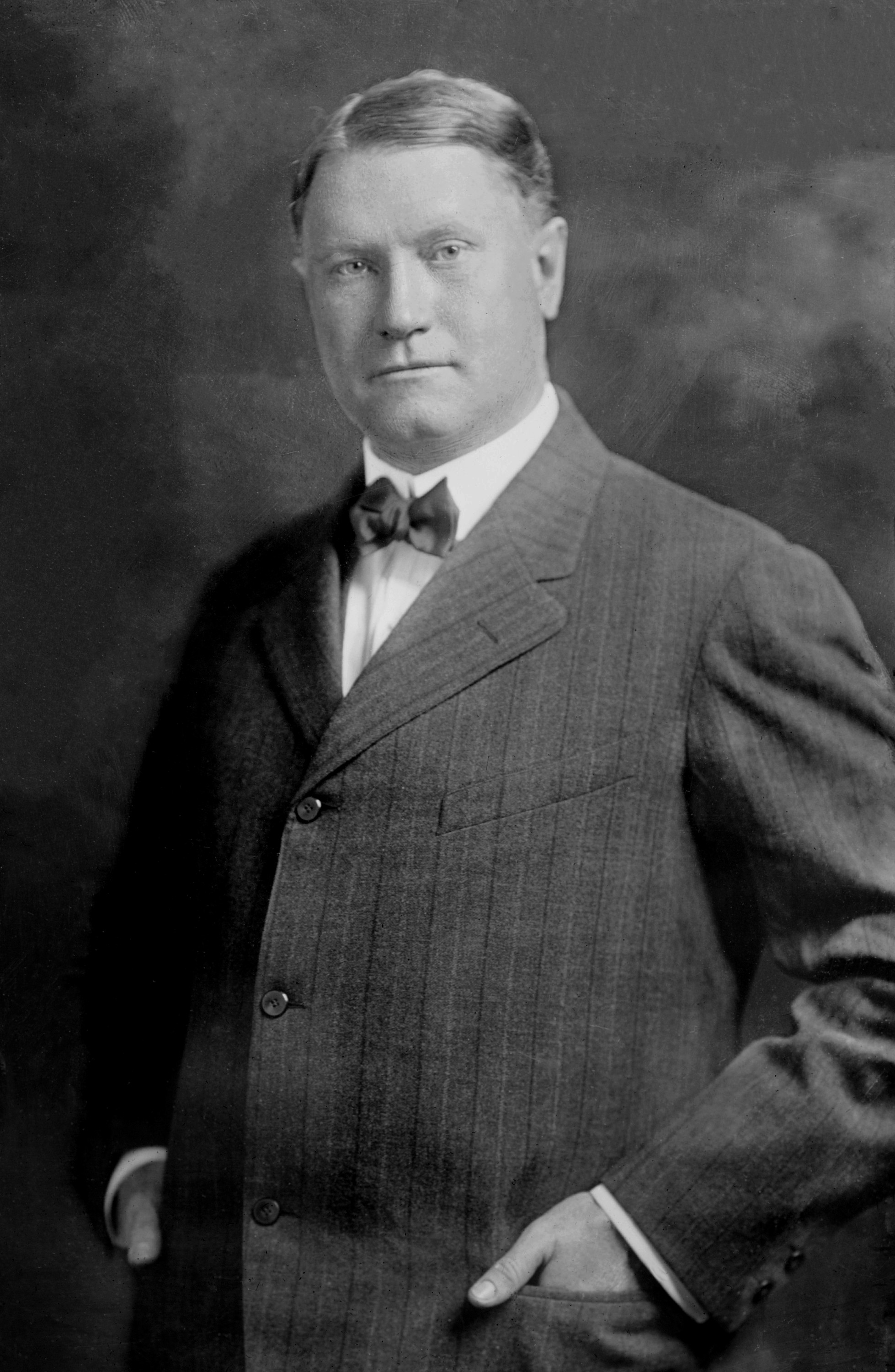
- Thornton, c. 1915
- Born: November 6, 1871; Logansport, Indiana, U.S.
- Died: March 14, 1933 (aged 61); New York, New York, U.S.
- Coaching career

Playing career
- 1893: Penn
- Position: Guard

Coaching career (HC unless noted)
- 1894: Vanderbilt

Head coaching record
- Overall: 7–1

Sir Henry Worth Thornton, KBE (November 6, 1871 – March 14, 1933) was an American businessman. Thornton served as general superintendent of the Long Island Rail Road from 1911 to 1914, general manager of the Great Eastern Railway in England from 1914 to 1922, and president of the Canadian National Railways from 1922 to 1932.

== Early life and education ==
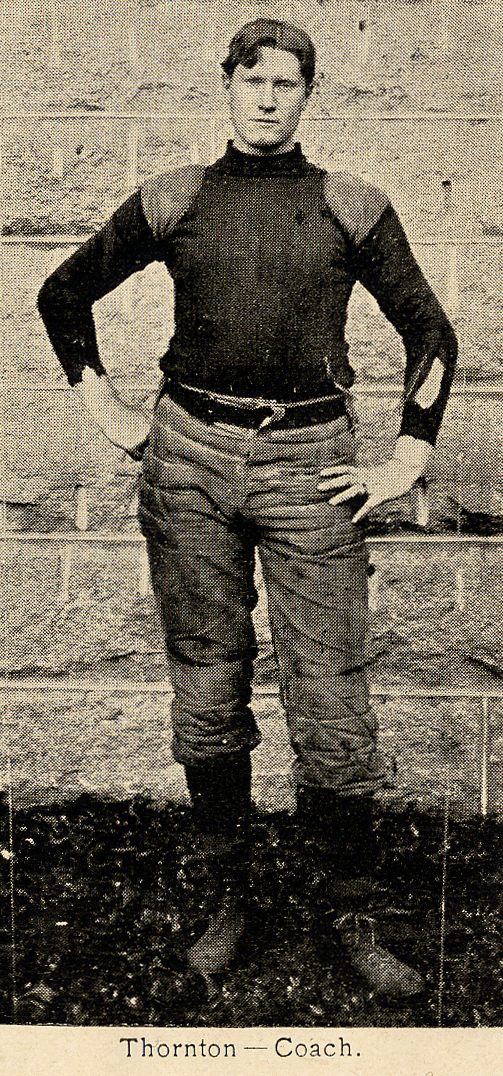
Thornton as coach of the 1894 Vanderbilt Commodores team

His parents were Henry Clay Thornton and Millamenta Comegys Worth. Thornton was educated at St. Paul's School in Concord, New Hampshire,, where he met James A. McCrea, son of James McCrea who was then president of Pennsylvania Railroad. After graduating, Thornton attended the University of Pennsylvania, where he played football and served as class president during his freshman year. Upon graduation in 1894, he coached the Vanderbilt football team to a 7–1 record.

== Career ==
Also in 1894, Thornton began his career in the railroad business, entering as a draftsman of the Pennsylvania Railroad based in the Pittsburgh office. He was promoted to supervisory engineer in 1899 and District Superintendent in 1901. He was appointed as general superintendent of Cleveland, Akron and Columbus Railroad, part of the Pennsylvania Railroad system in Ohio, (Note: James McCrea was president of the Cleveland, Akron and Columbus at this time.) in 1901. In 1912 he was named general superintendent of the Long Island Rail Road.

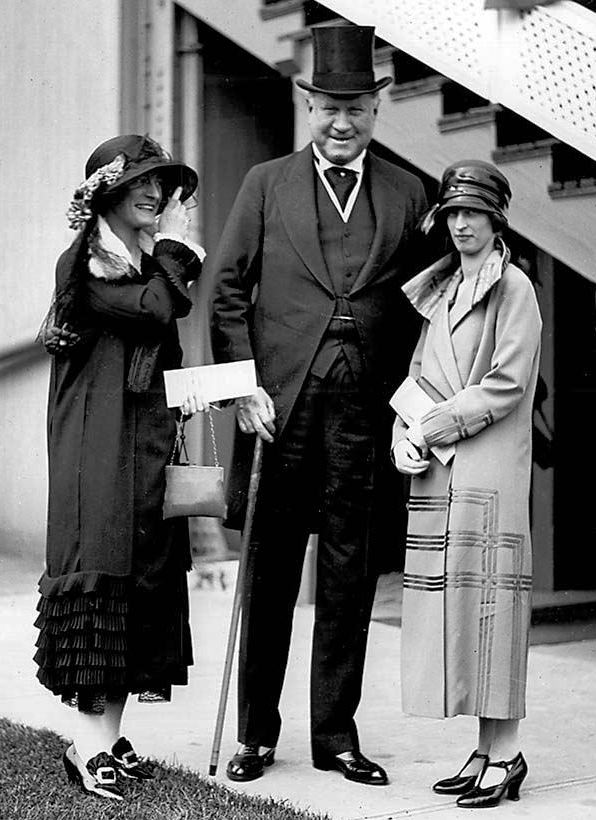
Sir Henry Worth Thornton and Lady Thornton at Ontario Jockey Club

In 1914, Thornton was made general manager of the Great Eastern Railway Company Ltd. Thornton served during World War I. As a Major General, he was appointed inspector general of Allied transportation. In 1919 he became a British subject, and King George V made him a Knight Commander of the Order of the British Empire. Thornton was also named an officer of the Order of Leopold and a Companion of the Legion of Honor of France. He received the Distinguished Service Medal from the United States.

In 1922 Thornton was named chairman of the board and president of the Canadian National Railways and tasked with modernizing and amalgamating several lines. He championed passenger comfort, introducing onboard radios and establishing of a radio network along the route (a precursor to the Canadian Broadcasting Corporation) and investing in hotels in communities served by the railway.

When the Conservative Party came to power in 1932, Thornton was forced to resign, denied a pension, and removed from the Board of Directors of a local bank. Disgraced, Thornton moved to New York City, where he died less than a year later from pneumonia and complications from surgery.

== Honors ==
Thornton Park (across from former CN Pacific Central Station) and Thornton Street in Vancouver and hotel (Sir Henry Thornton Village at former CN Hotel Jasper Park Lodge) in Canada, are named after Thornton. He delivered commencement addresses at MIT and Syracuse and earned an honorary doctorate from his alma mater, the University of Pennsylvania. In 1992 he was inducted into the Canadian Railway Hall of Fame.

== Family ==
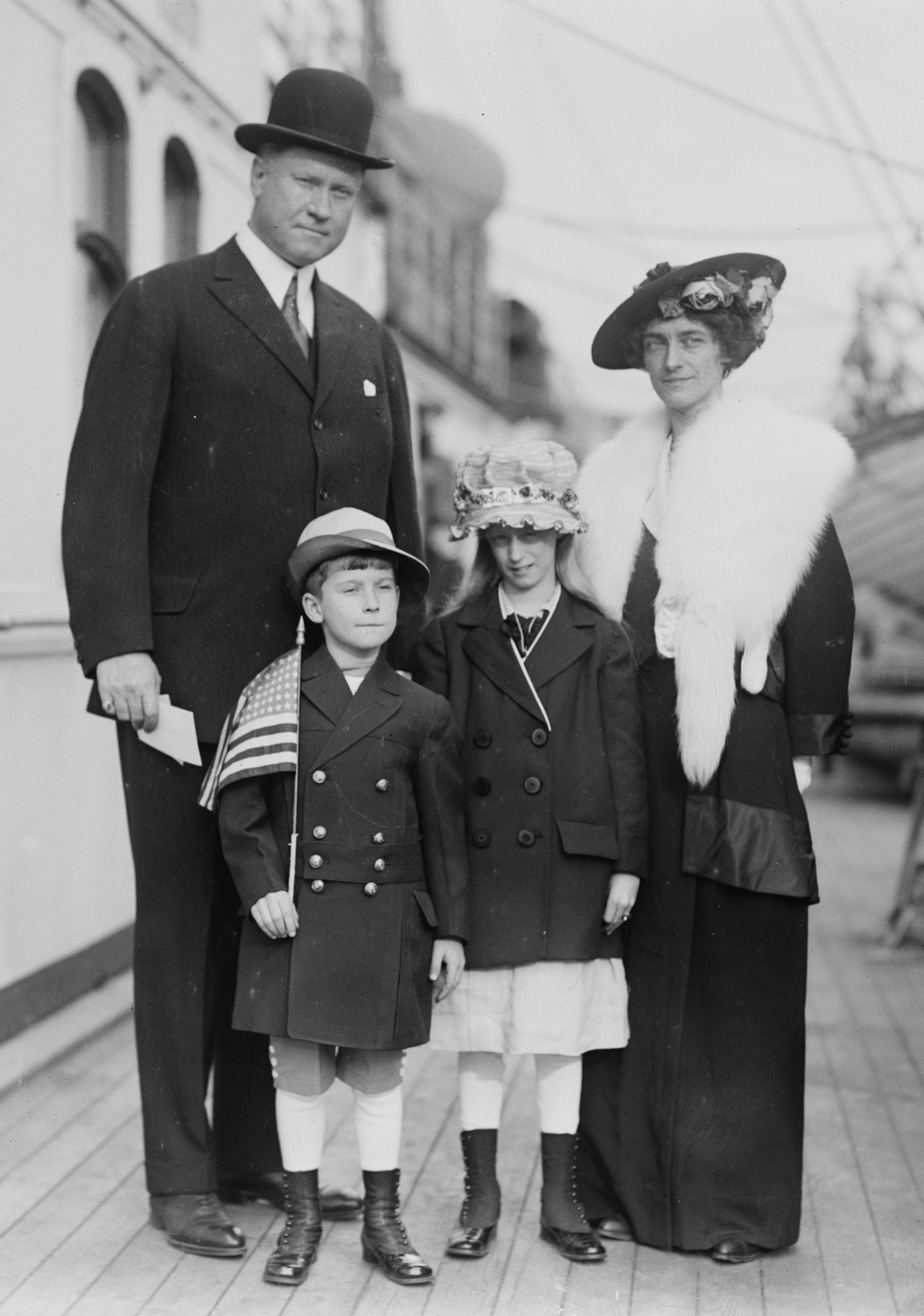
Thornton and family in 1915

Henry Worth Thornton was the son of Henry Clay Thornton, a prominent Logansport, Indiana, lawyer, and Millamenta Comegys Worth. Thornton's uncles included Cincinnati physician William Patton Thornton. He was cousin to Judge William Wheeler Thornton.

Thornton married Virginia D. Blair on June 20, 1901; they had two children: James Worth Thornton and Anna Blair Thornton (Harrison). In 1926 they divorced. He remarried shortly thereafter to Martha Watriss.
