= William Patton Thornton =

American physician and writer (1817–1883)

Dr. William Patton Thornton (February 6, 1817 – October 10, 1883) was an Americvan medical doctor, educator, writer and politician.

== Education and career ==
Thorton graduated from Kemper's Medical College in St. Louis and Jefferson Medical College in Philadelphia. After graduation he spent five years in Houston, Mississippi, where he began to specialize in diseases of the trachea and larynx.

In 1847, Thornton returned to Ohio and established a practice. He began a long affiliation with the Cincinnati Hospital and the University of Cincinnati College of Medicine, where he was chair of the Anatomy and Physiology Department. Thornton published papers on cholera and laryngology.

After retiring from practice in 1877, Thornton served as mayor of College Hill, Ohio, until his death. He was buried in Spring Grove Cemetery, Cincinnati, Ohio.

== Family ==
In 1841, William Thornton married Electa Bacon in Indianapolis, Indiana. He was cousin to Samuel W. Thornton and James Johnston Thornton.
