= Logansport Community School Corporation =

School district in Indiana, US

Logansport Community School Corporation (LCSC)

Address
- 2829 George St. Cass County Logansport, 46947; United States

District information
- Type: Public
- Motto: Success. Nothing Less.
- Grades: Pre-K through 12
- Superintendent: Michele Starkey
- School board: 5 members
- Schools: Elementary 3, Intermediate 1, Middle 1, High 1
- Budget: $47,009,766 (2024–2025)
- NCES District ID: 1806030

Students and staff
- Students: 4,449
- Teachers: 272
- Staff: 587
- Athletic conference: Hoosier

Other information
- 2023 Graduation Rate: 81.9%
- 2023 Graduates: 271
- Website: Official website

Logansport Community School Corporation (LCSC) is a school district headquartered in Logansport, Indiana.

The district includes the majority of Logansport. In addition, the district includes all of Clay, Clinton, and Eel townships, and portions of Miami, Noble, and Washington townships.

== History ==
Michele Starkey, an alumna of Logansport High School, became the superintendent in January 2010.

By 2024 the district had an increasing immigrant student population. The academy at Logansport enrolls new immigrants who attend class part time and support themselves working.

== Schools ==
Secondary schools

- Logansport High School
- Logansport Junior High School

Elementary schools

- Logansport Intermediate School
- Columbia Elementary School
- Fairview Elementary School
- Landis Elementary School

Preschools

- Berry Preschool

Alternative schools

- The academy at LCSC

Other

- Century Career Center
- LCSC Adult Learning Center
