= Special routes of U.S. Route 24 =

Special routes of U.S. Route 24

Highway system
- United States Numbered Highway System; List; Special; Divided

Several special routes of U.S. Route 24 (US 24) currently exist, while some are now decommissioned. These special routes include alternate, city, business, bypass, optional, and truck routes that branch from US 24.

== Colorado ==
=== Grand Junction bypass route ===
U.S. Highway 24 Bypass
- Location: Grand Junction–Fruitvale, Colorado
- Length: 4.3 mi (6.9 km)
- Existed: 1955–1975

U.S. Highway 24 Bypass (US 24 Byp.) was a bypass route of US 24 from Grand Junction to Fruitvale, Colorado. US 24 Byp. began at an interchange with US 6/US 24/US 50 (now Interstate 70 Business [I-70 Bus.]/US 6/US 50). US 24 also began at that interchange but traveled southeast toward downtown Grand Junction. In its entirety, the bypass route traveled east along North Avenue, a four-lane divided highway, for 4.3 miles (6.9 km). The bypass route ended at US 6/US 24 (now US 6/I-70 Bus.). Today, US 6 occupies the former bypass route.

US 24 Byp. was established in 1955 after US 6 and US 24 moved south onto a new four-lane road paralleling the Denver and Rio Grande Western Railroad. This was constructed so that the two routes directly serve downtown Grand Junction. In 1975, US 24 was removed west of Minturn, which necessitated the decommissioning of US 24 Byp.

=== Manitou Springs business loop ===
U.S. Highway 24 Business
- Location: Manitou Springs, Colorado
- Length: 2.816 mi (4.532 km)

U.S. Highway 24 Business (US 24 Bus.) is a business route of US 24 in Manitou Springs, Colorado. US 24 Bus. travels along Manitou Avenue in its entirety, which is mostly a three-lane street. US 24 Bus. begins at an incomplete interchange with US 24 and proceeds due southeast toward downtown Manitou Springs. Almost immediately, the business route crosses over Rainbow Falls and Fountain Creek. The route also serves Pikes Peak southeast of the falls. After going through downtown Manitou Springs, the route meets US 24 at a tight partial cloverleaf interchange. The route ends abruptly after the interchange.

=== Manitou Springs–Colorado Springs business route ===
U.S. Highway 24 Business
- Location: Manitou Springs–Colorado Springs, Colorado

== Kansas ==
=== Goodland business loop ===
U.S. Highway 24 Business
- Location: Goodland, Kansas
- Length: 2.9 mi (4.7 km)
- Existed: 1979–present

U.S. Highway 24 Business (US 24 Bus.) is a business route of US 24 in Goodland, Kansas. For the most part, US 24 Bus. travels along a former alignment of US 24. Also, the business route only travels through the outskirts of Goodland. US 24 Bus. begins at I-70/US 24/K-27 and travels north along K-27. After traveling for over 0.5 miles (0.80 km), US 24 Bus. turns east along what was once US 24. The business route then curves southward after traveling east for 1.8 miles (2.9 km). Just over 0.5 miles (0.80 km) southward, the business route ends at another interchange with I-70/US 24.

== Missouri ==
=== Kansas City business loop ===
U.S. Route 24 Business
- Location: Kansas City, Missouri
- Length: 4.5 mi (7.2 km)
- Existed: 2021–present

U.S. Route 24 Business (US 24 Bus.) is an unsigned business route of US 24 through Kansas City, Missouri, and is a former alignment of US 24. The route begins on the north side of the Downtown Loop and ends at I-435. Currently US 24 bypasses this route using I-435 and I-70.

=== Kansas City–Independence optional route ===
U.S. Route 24 Optional
- Location: Kansas City–Independence, Missouri

=== Napoleon–Lexington business loop ===
U.S. Route 24 Business
- Location: Napoleon–Lexington, Missouri
- Existed: 1959–1969

U.S. Route 24 Business (US 24 Bus.) was a business route of US 24 that used to travel on former US 24 through Napoleon and Lexington, Missouri. A bypass was finished in 1959, allowing US 24 to bypass the two towns. US 24 Bus. was established to travel along the former alignment through towns. No changes were made to the route until 1969, when Route 224 replaced the entirety of the business route.

=== Carrollton business route ===
U.S. Route 24 Business
- Location: Carrollton, Missouri

=== Kirksville city route ===
City U.S. Route 24
- Location: Kirksville, Missouri

=== Paris business loop ===
U.S. Route 24 Business
- Location: Paris, Missouri
- Length: 3.5 mi (5.6 km)
- Existed: 1973–present

U.S. Route 24 Business (US 24 Bus.) is a business route of US 24 in Paris, Missouri. US 24 Bus. and Route 154 begin at an intersection with US 24. Both routes travel eastward for 1.8 miles (2.9 km) to Route 15 south of Paris. At an intersection with Route 15, the business route turns north along Route 15. On the other hand, Route 154 briefly travels south along Route 15. For the remaining 1.7 miles (2.7 km), the business route travels north concurrently with Route 15, traveling through downtown Paris. After intersecting with US 24, the business route ends. The road continues north as part of Route 15.

== Illinois ==
=== Washington business loop ===
U.S. Route 24 Business
- Location: Washington, Illinois
- Length: 9.9 mi (15.9 km)
- Existed: 1996–present

U.S. Route 24 Business (US 24 Bus.) is a business route of US 24 in Washington, Illinois. Starting at a hybrid interchange with US 24, US 24 Bus. and Illinois Route 8 (IL 8) begin due southeast. IL 8 is assigned to travel west, while US 24 Bus. travels east, forming a 1.3-mile-long (2.1 km) wrong-way concurrency. On this concurrency, both routes travel on a four-lane divided highway, signed as McClugage Road. After the concurrency ended, US 24 Bus. then turns eastward along Washington Road, continuing on another four-lane highway. As the business route reaches downtown Washington, the road downgrades to a three-lane street (Peoria Street) with a center turn lane. In downtown, just past the 13-foot-3-inch-long (4.04 m) overpass, the business route comes across a traffic circle called Washington Square. The route continues as Walnut Street with three lanes. At the city limit, the route downgrades to a two-lane road. As the route nears Eureka, the route curves north toward Cruger, where the route meets US 24 and ends.

Before the business route was established, US 24 ran through Washington. By 1994, a bypass was under construction. It was eventually finished in 1995 and was then designated as US 24. The old alignment was later signed as US 24 Bus.

== Indiana ==
=== Logansport business loop ===
U.S. Route 24 Business
- Location: Dunkirk–New Waverly, Indiana
- Length: 12.2 mi (19.6 km)

U.S. Route 24 Business (US 24 Bus.) is a business route of US 24 from Dunkirk to New Waverly, Indiana. At a partial cloverleaf interchange in Dunkirk, US 24 turns south onto US 35. Market Street continues east as US 24 Bus. Entering Logansport, the road briefly curves south and then back east toward downtown. After crossing the Eel River and entering downtown, US 24 Bus. splits into a one-way pair. Eastbound traffic continues to use Market Street, while westbound travels along 24th Street, Broadway, and Eel River Avenue. After the pair, the business route continues east on two-way traffic. After leaving Logansport, the road becomes Logansport Road for the rest of the business route. Also, the road begins to parallel the north bank of the Wabash River. After meandering along the river, the business route ends at US 24 (Hoosier Heartland Highway). The road continues east toward Peru with no designations.

=== Peru business route ===
U.S. Route 24 Business
- Location: Peru, Indiana

=== Wabash business route ===
U.S. Route 24 Business
- Location: Wabash, Indiana

=== Fort Wayne truck route ===
U.S. Route 24 Truck
- Location: Fort Wayne, Indiana

== Ohio ==
=== Perrysburg–Toledo business route ===
U.S. Route 24 Business
- Location: Perrysburg–Toledo, Ohio

=== Toledo bypass route ===
U.S. Route 24 Bypass
- Location: Maumee–Toledo, Ohio
- Existed: 1947–1969

U.S. Route 24 Bypass (US 24 Byp.) was a bypass route of US 24.

== Ohio-Michigan ==
=== Toledo–Woodhaven alternate route ===
US Highway 24A
- Location: Toledo, Ohio–Woodhaven, Michigan
- Existed: 1945–1959

U.S. Route 24A or US Highway 24A (US 24A) was an alternate route of US 24. US 24A was established in 1945 to travel along the Maumee River and Lake Erie. The route originally traveled along Summit Street from US 23/US 24 (Jefferson Avenue) in downtown Toledo to US 24/M-151 north of Erie. As a result, State Route 577 (SR 577) was removed north of downtown Toledo. In 1950–1951, US 24A was extended southward by one block to Monroe Street due to the relocation of US 23/US 24 onto US 223 (Monroe Street). In 1953, in response to the relocation of US 24 along the remainder of SR 577, the alternate route was extended south along part of the former alignment. The extension ran along Western Avenue and Broadway Street before reaching its pre-1953 segment. In 1957, the first section of the Detroit–Toledo Expressway (from south of Erie to Woodhaven) opened to traffic, which moved the alternate route onto the expressway. In 1959, the alternate route was removed. This coincided with the opening of the Ohio section of the Detroit–Toledo Expressway and the signage of I-75 and I-280.

== Michigan ==
=== Pontiac business loop ===
Business US Highway 24
- Location: Pontiac, Michigan
- Existed: 1986–present

Business US Highway 24 (Bus. US 24) is a business loop that serves downtown Pontiac, Michigan. The loop follows Square Lake Road southwest of the city in Bloomfield Township and then Woodward Avenue northward into downtown where it splits to form a loop around the central business district. Bus. US 24 continues northward along Cesar Chavez Avenue and then follows Dixie Highway once it crosses into Waterford Township. The northern end of the business loop as an intersection with US 24 where the parent highway transitions from Telegraph Road to Dixie Highway in Waterford Township. The designation was approved in 1985 when US 10 was truncated to Bay City, and, when the change was made the following year, US 24 replaced US 10 on Telegraph Road north of Square Lake Road, and Bus. US 10 through downtown was redesignated Bus. US 24.

== See also ==
- List of special routes of the United States Numbered Highway System
