= Robert Scott Justice =

American politician

Member of the Indiana House of Representatives
- In office 1944–1948

Member of the Indiana House of Representatives
- In office 1950–1952

Member of the Indiana Senate
- In office 1956–1960

Personal details
- Born: March 8, 1912 (age 114) Cass County, Indiana, U.S.
- Died: December 9, 1992 Logansport, Indiana, U.S.
- Party: Republican
- Education: DePauw University; University of Michigan; Harvard Law School

Robert Scott Justice (March 8, 1912 – December 9, 1992) was an American politician from the state of Indiana. A Republican, he served in the Indiana House of Representatives and Indiana State Senate in a legislative career spanning 1946 to 1960.
