= New Waverly =

New Waverly may refer to the following places in the United States:

- New Waverly, Indiana
- New Waverly, Texas
