= Anoka =

Anoka is the name of several places in the United States:

- Anoka, Indiana, an unincorporated place
- Anoka, Minnesota, a city
  - Anoka (Metro Transit station)
  - Anoka County, Minnesota
  - Anoka-Hennepin School District 11
- Anoka, Nebraska, a village
- Lake Anoka in Avon Park, Florida

== See also ==
- Anokha, a Bollywood film
