= Adamsboro, Indiana =

Adamsboro
- Unincorporated community
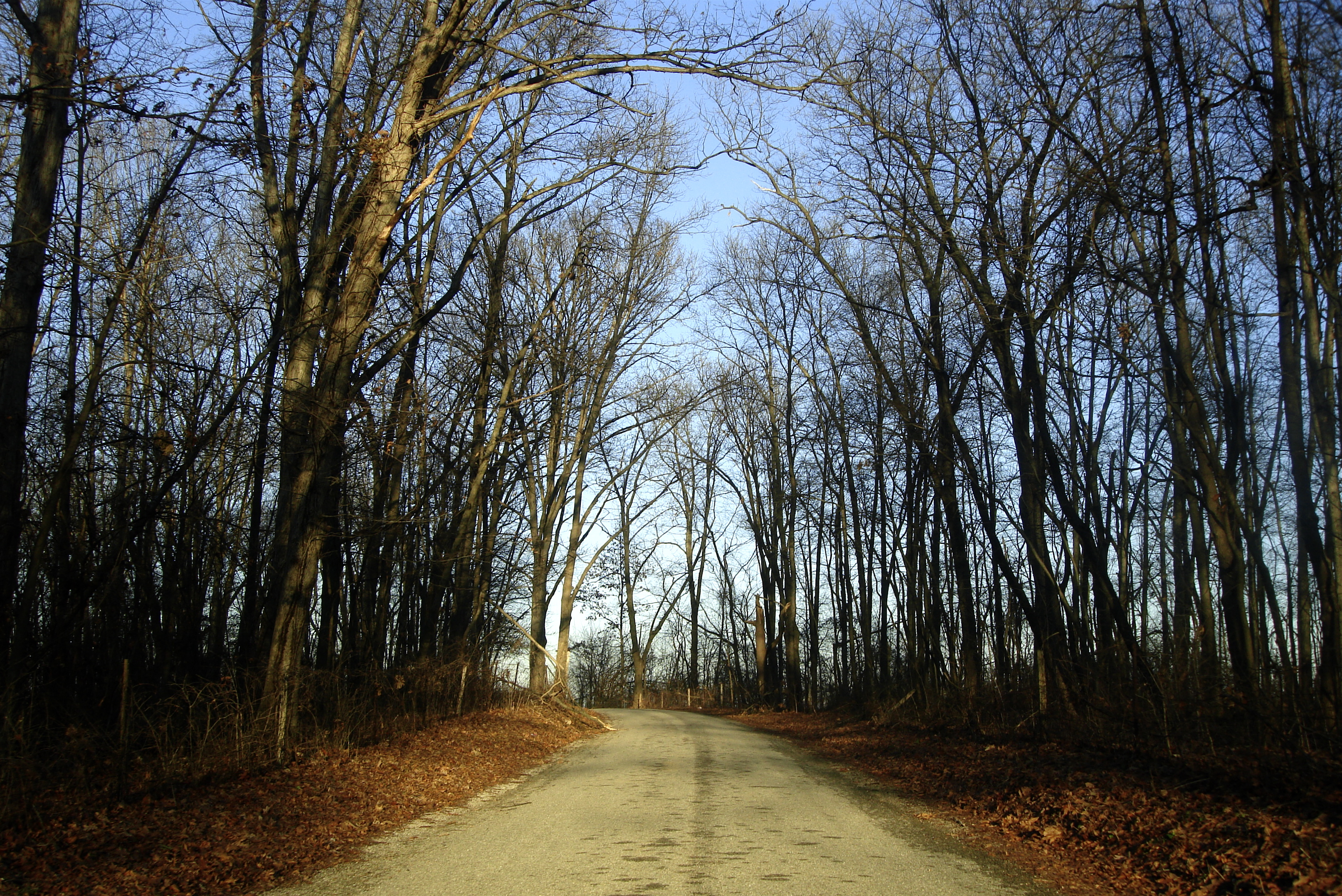
- A country road in Adamsboro.

- Cass County's location in Indiana

- Location in Cass County
- Coordinates: 40°47′04″N 86°16′01″W
- Country: United States
- State: Indiana
- County: Cass
- Township: Clay
- Elevation: 646 ft (197 m)
- ZIP code: 46947
- FIPS code: 18-00514
- GNIS feature ID: 449611

Adamsboro is an unincorporated community in Clay Township, Cass County, Indiana.

== History ==
Adamsboro was platted in 1872 when the Eel River Railroad was extended to that point. It was named for its founder, George E. Adams.

In 1890, the population was estimated as around 250 residents. In 1900, the population was 146.

By 1920, the population was 160. The population was 54 in 1940.

== See also ==
- New Waverly, Indiana
