= Pleasant Hill Church =

Pleasant Hill Church may refer to:

in the United States

(by state then city)

- Pleasant Hill Presbyterian Church, Pleasant Hill, Alabama
- Pleasant Hill Methodist Church, Pleasant Hill, Arkansas
- Pleasant Hill Baptist Church, Paulding County, Georgia
- Pleasant Hill Church (Clinton, Indiana)
- Pleasant Hill United Church of Christ, Pleasant Hill, Ohio
