= Logansport High School =

Location
- 1 Berry Lane; Logansport, Cass County, Indiana 46947; United States; 40.749962°N 86.332931°W

Information
- Type: Public High School
- Established: 1871
- School district: Logansport Community School Corporation
- Superintendent: Michael Miller
- CEEB code: 152095
- NCES School ID: 180603001060
- Principal: Matthew Jones
- Teaching staff: 79.89 (on FTE basis)
- Grades: 9 to 12
- Gender: coed
- Enrollment: 1,148 (2024–2025)
- Student to teacher ratio: 14.37
- Colors: Red and black
- Slogan: We empower students to achieve excellence every day
- Fight song: Logansport High School Fight Song
- Athletics conference: Hoosier Conference (IHSAA) Since 2024 (Charter member in 1926)
- Mascot: Felix the Cat
- Team name: Berries
- Newspaper: The Magpie
- Yearbook: Tattler
- Website: lhs.lcsc.k12.in.us

Logansport Community High School is a high school located in Logansport, Indiana, USA. It is a part of the Logansport Community School Corporation. The first recorded commencement took place in June 1871, at the Mesodian Opera House, with three graduates.

The majority of Logansport is in the school district, of which this is the sole comprehensive high school.

== History ==
High School classes had first been offered in Logansport, in 1863, at the New Seminary, which was a three-story stone building built on the corner of Broadway and Thirteenth Streets in 1848–1849. The first record of a high school commencement occurred on June 1, 1871.

In 1874, the Seminary was torn down with a new school, known as Central or Lincoln School, being built on the same site. This served as the high school until 1894, when the Roosevelt building, at the corner of Broadway and Seventh Streets, was used until 1913.

Lincoln School was razed in 1913, and what is now referred to as the "Old" Logansport High School was built between Thirteenth and Fourteenth Streets and Broadway and Market Streets. This building would serve for the next 60 years, until in 1967, it was decided that a new building would be needed.

The "New" Logansport High School, which opened in 1973, was relocated to the edge of town on an 86 acres (35 ha) site.

== Campus ==
The new facility was split into four sections: an athletic wing, a student services wing, and two academic wings with classrooms. The athletic wing includes the new "Berry Bowl", the schools basketball court, with seating for 5,830, a six-lane swimming pool with seating for 400, standard locker room facilities and wrestling room. School offices, the cafeteria, and the library are all located in the student services section, which is centrally located in the middle of the facility. The academic wings have classrooms grouped into areas of study.

McHale Auditorium was dedicated November 7, 1976. The auditorium was built with a $1,000,000 donation from Frank McHale, along with a $2,000,000 endowment for continued upkeep.

An observatory was added in 1996, just south of the main building. Major renovation to the school occurred in 2002, with upgrades to classrooms, the construction of new science and special needs wings, new office facilities, and the New Century Career Center, which replaced EL-Tip-Wa Vocational School, that had been located in an old Pepsi Bottling Company warehouse at Sixth and Miami Streets.

== Academics ==
LHS is a part of the Logansport Community School Corporation and is accredited by AdvancED and the Indiana State Board of Education.

Ten areas of Advanced Placement Program (AP) classes are offered as well as Honor Courses and Dual Credit courses. For the 2015–2016 school year, Logansport's mean SAT score was 1366 with the new SAT scoring system. The Indiana state mean was 1472, while the national mean was 1484.

In 2016, 36% of graduates received an Academic Honors Diploma and 52% earned a Core 40 diploma.

== Athletics ==
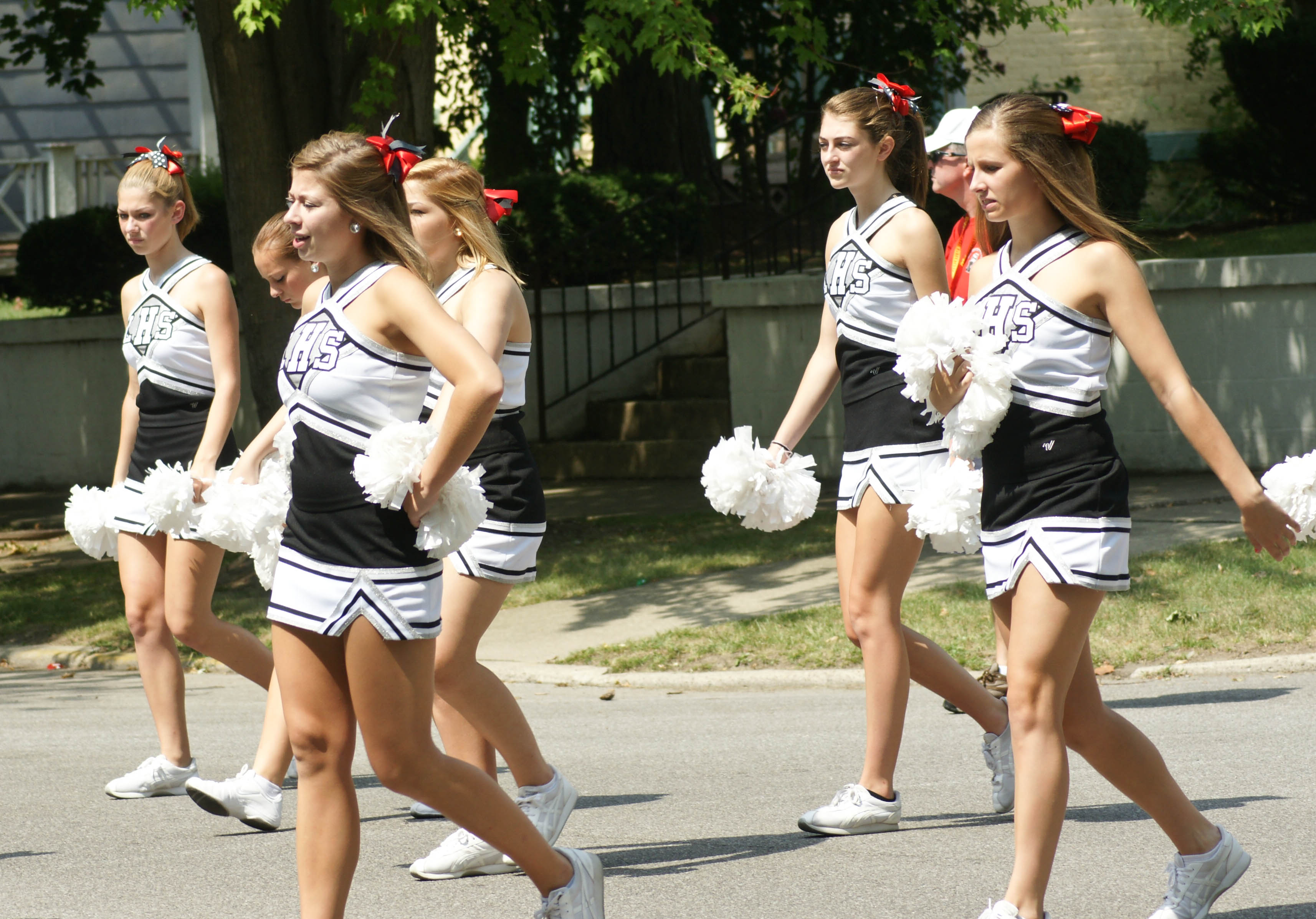
Cheerleaders at a community parade.

Logansport High School is a charter member of the oldest sports conference in Indiana, the North Central Conference of the Indiana High School Athletic Association (IHSAA).

Logansport High School offers 10 men's and 10 women's varsity sports, with all but soccer in the 4A, classification of IHSAA, soccer is 2A. Men's sports offered are basketball, baseball, cross country, track, American football, wrestling, tennis, golf, swimming, and soccer. Women's sports offered are basketball, softball, cross country, gymnastics, track, volleyball, tennis, golf, swimming, and soccer.

In 1934, Logansport High School won the Indiana High School Basketball championship. The school won the IHSAA baseball championships in 1975, 1977, 1979, and 1991.

== Notable alumni ==
- Jalen Adaway, professional basketball player
- Thurman C. Crook, former member of the U.S. House of Representatives
- Meredith "Med" Flory, a 1944 graduate of LHS, was a jazz saxophonist, bandleader, and television and film actor.
- Aaron Heilman, a 1997 graduate of LHS, MLB pitcher.

== See also ==
- List of high schools in Indiana
- North Central Conference
- Logansport, Indiana

== Bibliography ==
- "History of LHS".
- "History of Nickname "Berries"".
- "History of Mascot Felix the Cat".
- Copeland, Richard. "Frank McHale FOOTBALL PLAYER - LAWYER - PHILANTHROPIST". Archived from the original on September 4, 2016.
- "A History of the North Central Conference; 1926 - present" (PDF).
- "IHSAA Boys Basketball State Champions".
- "IHSAA Baseball State Champions".
- "Meredith Irwin "Med" Flory Hall of Distinction".
- "Accreditation".
- "Logansport High School Profile 2016-2017" (PDF).
- "Indiana School Improvement Plan Logansport High School Logansport School Corporation" (PDF).
- "Logansport High School Program of Studies" (PDF).
- "Indiana Core 40" (PDF).
- "Logansport High School Clubs 2016 – 2017" (PDF).
- "Logansport High School Athletics".
- "Logansport High School Quick Facts".
