= Washington Township, Cass County, Indiana =

Washington Township
- Township
- Location of Washington Township in Cass County
- Coordinates: 40°41′47″N 86°19′55″W
- Country: United States
- State: Indiana
- County: Cass

Government
  - Type: Indiana township

Area
  - Total: 35.34 sq mi (91.53 km^{2})
  - Land: 35.16 sq mi (91.07 km^{2})
  - Water: 0.18 sq mi (0.46 km^{2})
- Elevation: 715 ft (218 m)

Population (2020)
  - Total: 1,557
  - Density: 44.28/sq mi (17.10/km^{2})
- FIPS code: 18-80432
- GNIS feature ID: 453986

Washington Township is one of fourteen townships in Cass County, Indiana, and one of the forty-six townships sharing the name in the state. As of the 2020 census, its population was 1,557 (down from 1,608 at 2010) and contained 708 housing units.

== History ==
Washington Township was organized in 1842. It was named for George Washington, first President of the United States.

== Geography ==
Washington Township covers an area of 35.34 square miles (91.5 km^{2}); 0.18 square miles (0.47 km^{2}) (0.51 percent) of this is water.

=== Cities and towns ===
- Logansport (south quarter)

=== Unincorporated towns ===
- Anoka

=== Adjacent townships ===
- Miami (northeast)
- Tipton (east)
- Deer Creek (south)
- Washington Township, Carroll County (southwest)
- Clinton (west)
- Eel (northwest)

=== Major highways ===
- U.S. Route 35
- Indiana State Road 29
- Indiana State Road 218

=== Cemeteries ===
The township contains four cemeteries: Bruner, Ramer, Taber and West.
