= Thompson Barnett House =

Historic house in Indiana, United States

- U.S. National Register of Historic Places
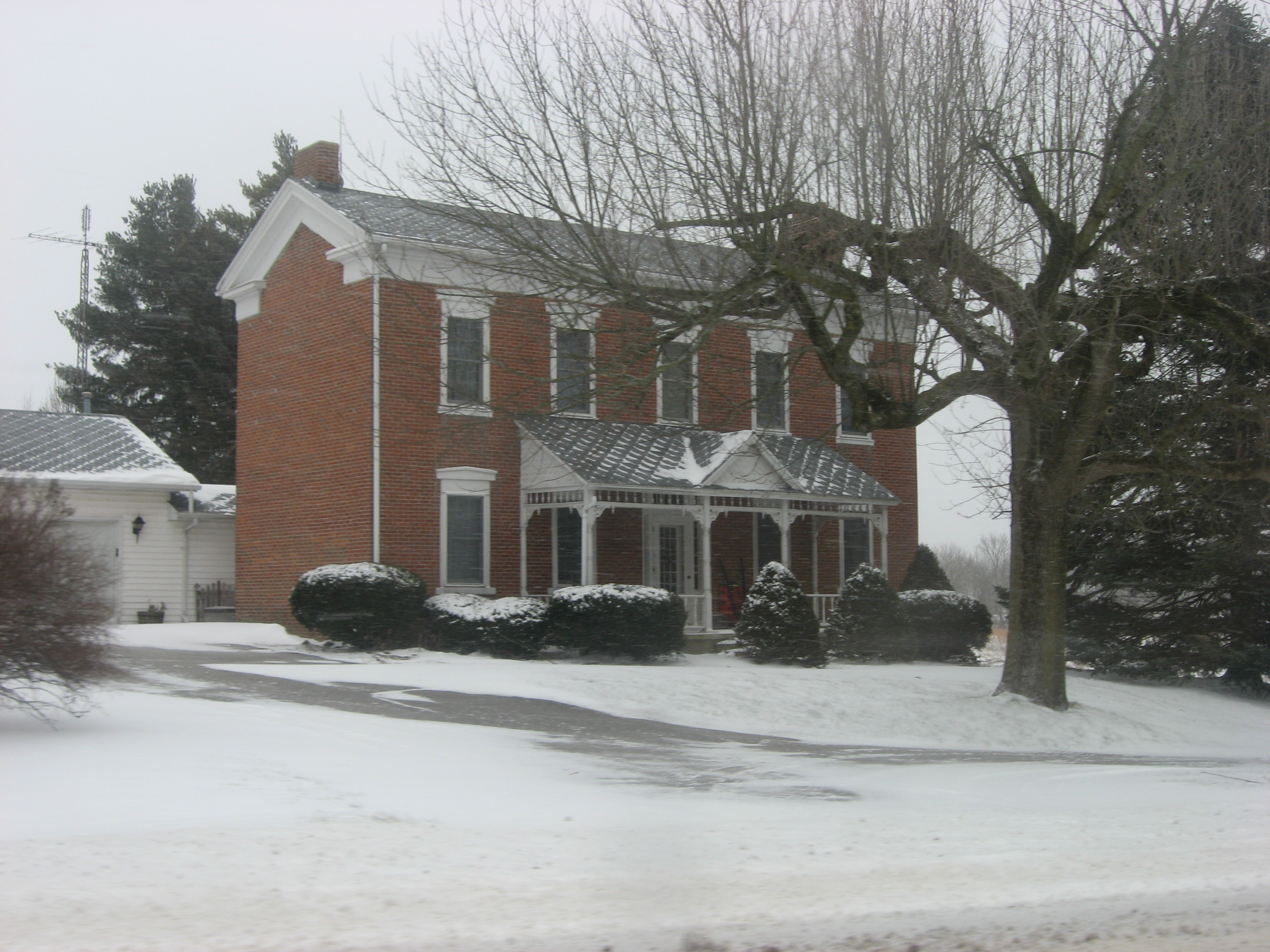
- Thompson Barnett House, January 2012

- Location within Cass County, Indiana Location within Indiana Location within the United States
- Location: State Road 25, north of Logansport, Clay Township, Cass County, Indiana
- Coordinates: 40°47′2″N 86°21′1″W
- Area: less than one acre
- Built: c. 1854, c. 1870
- Architectural style: Greek Revival
- NRHP reference No.: 86001620
- Added to NRHP: August 14, 1986

Thompson Barnett House, also known as the Barnett-Schafer House, is a historic home located in Clay Township, Cass County, Indiana. It was erected about 1854, and is a two-story, five-bay, Greek Revival style brick dwelling. It has a side-gable roof and 1 1/2-story gabled brick ell added about 1870.

It was listed on the National Register of Historic Places in 1986.
