= Deacon, Indiana =

Deacon
- Unincorporated community
- Cass County's location in Indiana

- Location in Cass County
- Coordinates: 40°38′02″N 86°19′02″W
- Country: United States
- State: Indiana
- County: Cass
- Township: Deer Creek
- Elevation: 755 ft (230 m)
- ZIP code: 46994
- FIPS code: 18-17038
- GNIS feature ID: 433385

Deacon is an unincorporated community in Deer Creek Township, Cass County, Indiana.

== History ==
A post office was established at Deacon in 1844, and remained in operation until it was discontinued in 1903. The community was named for its first postmaster, William R. Deacon.
