= Miami Bend, Indiana =

Miami Bend
- Unincorporated community
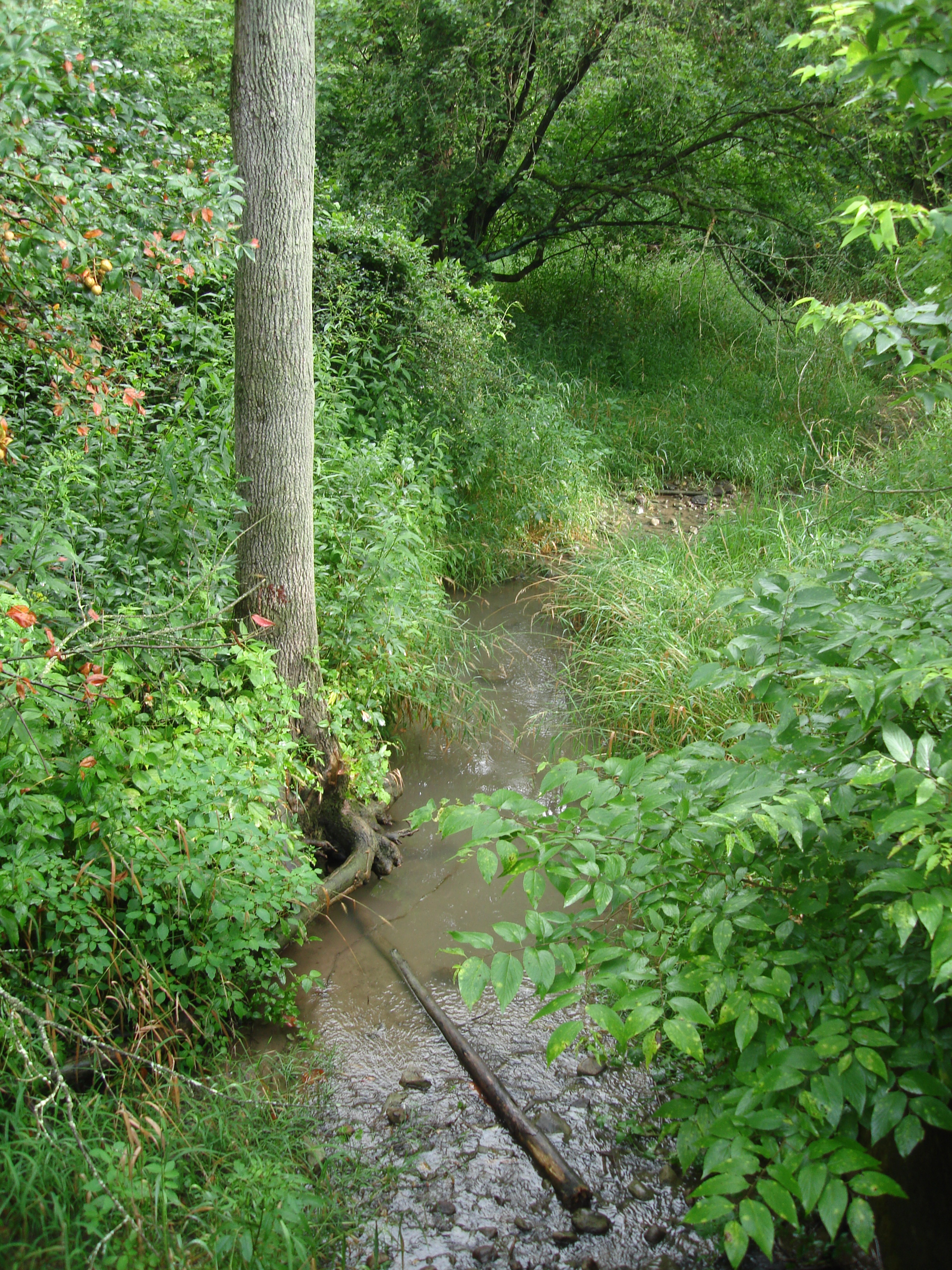
- A stream in Miami Bend.

- Cass County's location in Indiana

- Location in Cass County
- Coordinates: 40°45′03″N 86°17′53″W
- Country: United States
- State: Indiana
- County: Cass
- Township: Miami
- Elevation: 607 ft (185 m)
- ZIP code: 46947
- FIPS code: 18-48690
- GNIS feature ID: 439067

Miami Bend is an unincorporated community in Miami Township, Cass County, Indiana, United States.
