= Clay Township, Indiana =

Clay Township is the name of seventeen townships in the U.S. state of Indiana:

- Clay Township, Bartholomew County, Indiana
- Clay Township, Carroll County, Indiana
- Clay Township, Cass County, Indiana
- Clay Township, Dearborn County, Indiana
- Clay Township, Decatur County, Indiana
- Clay Township, Hamilton County, Indiana
- Clay Township, Hendricks County, Indiana
- Clay Township, Howard County, Indiana
- Clay Township, Kosciusko County, Indiana
- Clay Township, LaGrange County, Indiana
- Clay Township, Miami County, Indiana
- Clay Township, Morgan County, Indiana
- Clay Township, Owen County, Indiana
- Clay Township, Pike County, Indiana
- Clay Township, St. Joseph County, Indiana
- Clay Township, Spencer County, Indiana
- Clay Township, Wayne County, Indiana

See also: other places named Clay Township (disambiguation).
