= Dunkirk, Cass County, Indiana =

Dunkirk
- Unincorporated community
- Cass County's location in Indiana

- Location in Cass County
- Coordinates: 40°45′23″N 86°23′37″W
- Country: United States
- State: Indiana
- County: Cass
- Township: Eel
- Elevation: 604 ft (184 m)
- ZIP code: 46925
- FIPS code: 18-19060
- GNIS feature ID: 433785

Dunkirk is an unincorporated town in Eel Township, Cass County, Indiana.

== Geography ==
Dunkirk is located on the western edge of the city of Logansport, just east of the intersection of U.S. Routes 24 and 35.
