= Young America, Indiana =

Young America
- Unincorporated community and Census-designated place
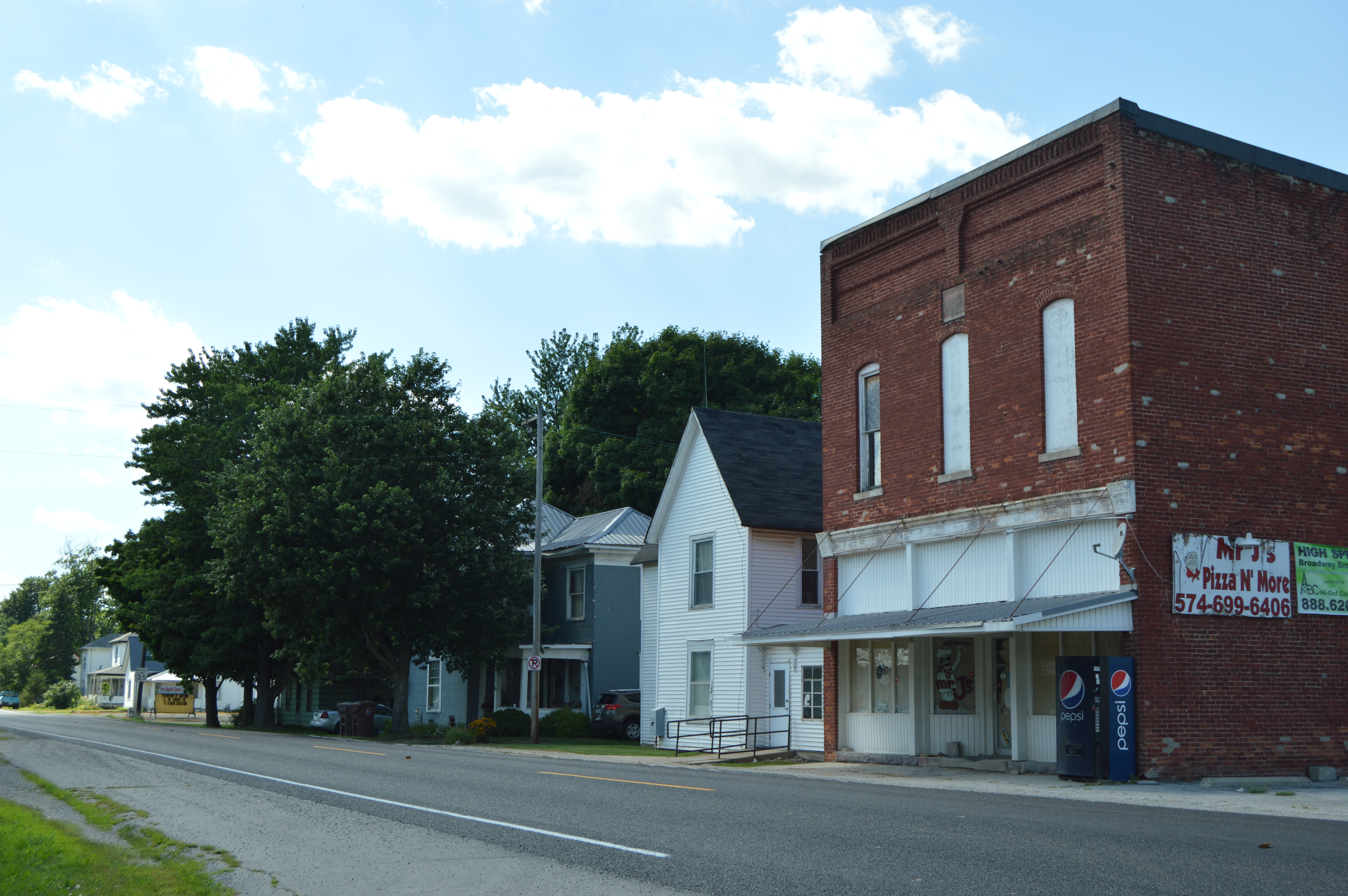
- Buildings on Roush Street

- Cass County's location in Indiana

- Location in Cass County
- Coordinates: 40°34′06″N 86°20′55″W
- Country: United States
- State: Indiana
- County: Cass
- Township: Deer Creek

Area
  - Total: 0.42 sq mi (1.1 km^{2})
- Elevation: 761 ft (232 m)

Population
  - Total: 118
- Time zone: Eastern (EST)
- ZIP code: 46998
- Area code: 574
- FIPS code: 18-86156
- GNIS feature ID: 2830331

Young America is an unincorporated community in Deer Creek Township, Cass County, Indiana, United States.

== History ==
Young America was platted about 1856. The town sprang up around a saw mill. When someone wrote "Young America" on the mill's boiler, to indicate the promise of the enterprise, the name stuck.

The Young America post office was established in 1876 and ceased operations in 2019.

== Geography ==
=== Climate ===
According to the Köppen Climate Classification system, Young America has a hot-summer humid continental climate, abbreviated "Dfa" on climate maps. The hottest temperature recorded in Young America was 101 °F (38.3 °C) on June 29, 2012, while the coldest temperature recorded was −32 °F (−35.6 °C) on January 2, 2023.

Climate data for Young America, Indiana, 1991–2020 normals, extremes 1992–present
Month	Jan	Feb	Mar	Apr	May	Jun	Jul	Aug	Sep	Oct	Nov	Dec	Year
Record high °F (°C)	65 (18)	73 (23)	85 (29)	86 (30)	96 (36)	101 (38)	100 (38)	94 (34)	95 (35)	91 (33)	79 (26)	70 (21)	101 (38)
Mean maximum °F (°C)	55.1 (12.8)	56.7 (13.7)	70.1 (21.2)	79.8 (26.6)	89.2 (31.8)	89.6 (32.0)	90.8 (32.7)	89.9 (32.2)	90.5 (32.5)	83.4 (28.6)	68.1 (20.1)	58.0 (14.4)	93.8 (34.3)
Mean daily maximum °F (°C)	31.9 (−0.1)	35.9 (2.2)	47.3 (8.5)	60.4 (15.8)	71.8 (22.1)	80.3 (26.8)	82.6 (28.1)	81.2 (27.3)	76.5 (24.7)	64.2 (17.9)	49.1 (9.5)	36.9 (2.7)	59.8 (15.5)
Daily mean °F (°C)	24.2 (−4.3)	27.8 (−2.3)	37.9 (3.3)	49.4 (9.7)	61.1 (16.2)	70.0 (21.1)	72.3 (22.4)	70.6 (21.4)	64.3 (17.9)	53.0 (11.7)	40.4 (4.7)	29.9 (−1.2)	50.1 (10.1)
Mean daily minimum °F (°C)	16.5 (−8.6)	19.8 (−6.8)	28.5 (−1.9)	38.4 (3.6)	50.3 (10.2)	59.7 (15.4)	62.0 (16.7)	59.9 (15.5)	52.2 (11.2)	41.8 (5.4)	31.7 (−0.2)	22.8 (−5.1)	40.3 (4.6)
Mean minimum °F (°C)	−5.2 (−20.7)	−3.7 (−19.8)	12.4 (−10.9)	25.1 (−3.8)	34.5 (1.4)	46.6 (8.1)	50.7 (10.4)	48.5 (9.2)	39.9 (4.4)	28.7 (−1.8)	7.1 (−13.8)	4.7 (−15.2)	−10.1 (−23.4)
Record low °F (°C)	−32 (−36)	−22 (−30)	−9 (−23)	13 (−11)	22 (−6)	35 (2)	42 (6)	40 (4)	31 (−1)	23 (−5)	2 (−17)	−11 (−24)	−32 (−36)
Average precipitation inches (mm)	2.52 (64)	2.25 (57)	2.63 (67)	3.64 (92)	3.94 (100)	5.19 (132)	5.14 (131)	3.99 (101)	3.37 (86)	3.08 (78)	3.08 (78)	2.29 (58)	41.12 (1,044)
Average snowfall inches (cm)	8.2 (21)	7.3 (19)	2.7 (6.9)	0.6 (1.5)	0.0 (0.0)	0.0 (0.0)	0.0 (0.0)	0.0 (0.0)	0.0 (0.0)	0.0 (0.0)	0.7 (1.8)	5.1 (13)	24.6 (63.2)
Average extreme snow depth inches (cm)	6.0 (15)	5.2 (13)	2.6 (6.6)	0.4 (1.0)	0.0 (0.0)	0.0 (0.0)	0.0 (0.0)	0.0 (0.0)	0.0 (0.0)	0.0 (0.0)	0.8 (2.0)	3.5 (8.9)	7.7 (20)
Average precipitation days (≥ 0.01 in)	10.6	9.2	9.4	10.9	10.9	10.8	9.4	8.7	7.2	7.9	8.7	10.1	113.8
Average snowy days (≥ 0.1 in)	5.5	4.8	2.1	0.4	0.0	0.0	0.0	0.0	0.0	0.0	0.5	3.6	16.9
Source 1: NOAA
Source 2: National Weather Service (mean maxima/minima 2006–2020)

== Demographics ==
Historical population
Census	Pop.	Note	%±
2023 (est.)	298

The United States Census Bureau delineated Young America as a census designated place in the 2022 American Community Survey.
