= Clay Township, Cass County, Indiana =

Clay Township
- Township
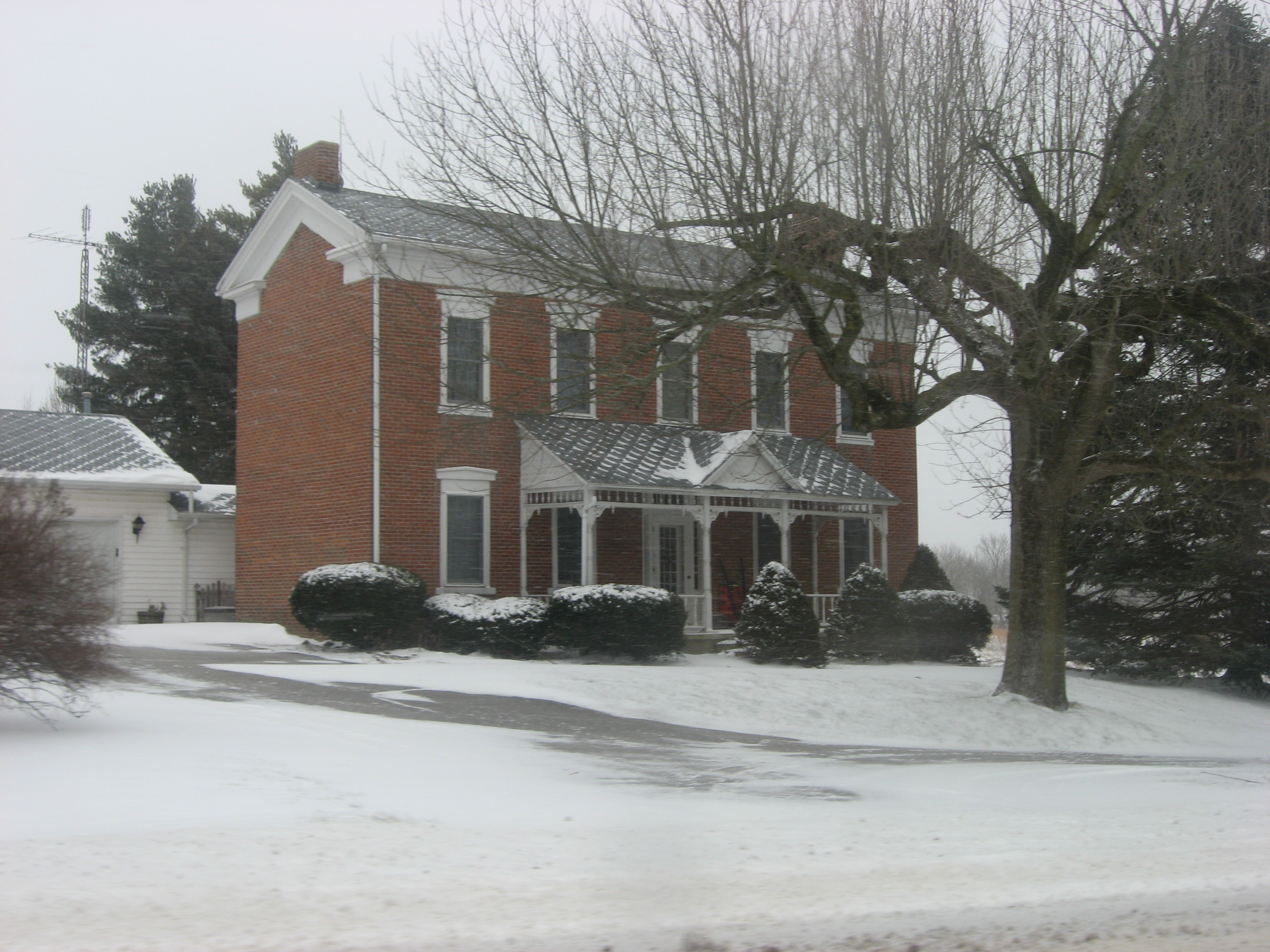
- The Thompson Barnett House, a historic site in the township

- Location of Clay Township in Cass County
- Coordinates: 40°48′04″N 86°18′02″W
- Country: United States
- State: Indiana
- County: Cass

Government
  - Type: Indiana township

Area
  - Total: 20.11 sq mi (52.1 km^{2})
  - Land: 19.93 sq mi (51.6 km^{2})
  - Water: 0.18 sq mi (0.47 km^{2})
- Elevation: 728 ft (222 m)

Population (2020)
  - Total: 2,842
  - Density: 141.4/sq mi (54.6/km^{2})
- FIPS code: 18-13006
- GNIS feature ID: 453206

Clay Township is one of fourteen townships in Cass County, Indiana, United States, and one of the seventeen townships sharing the name in the state. As of the 2020 census, its population was 2,842 (up from 2,817 at 2010) and it contained 1,177 housing units.

== History ==
Clay Township was organized in 1832. It was named for Henry Clay, three-term Speaker of the House of Representatives and Secretary of State.

Thompson Barnett House was listed on the National Register of Historic Places in 1986.

== Geography ==
According to the 2010 census, the township has a total area of 20.11 square miles (52.1 km^{2}), of which 19.93 square miles (51.6 km^{2}) (or 99.10%) is land and 0.18 square miles (0.47 km^{2}) (or 0.90%) is water.

=== Cities and towns ===
- Logansport (northeast edge)

=== Unincorporated towns ===
- Adamsboro

=== Adjacent townships ===
- Bethlehem (north)
- Adams (northeast)
- Miami (east)
- Eel (southwest)
- Noble (west)
- Harrison (northwest)

=== Major highways ===
- Indiana State Road 25

=== Cemeteries ===
The township contains two cemeteries: Bethel and Wilson.
