= Miami Township, Cass County, Indiana =

Miami Township
- Township
- Location of Miami Township in Cass County
- Coordinates: 40°46′23″N 86°13′09″W
- Country: United States
- State: Indiana
- County: Cass

Government
  - Type: Indiana township

Area
  - Total: 20.34 sq mi (52.67 km^{2})
  - Land: 20.06 sq mi (51.95 km^{2})
  - Water: 0.27 sq mi (0.71 km^{2})
- Elevation: 699 ft (213 m)

Population (2020)
  - Total: 1,311
  - Density: 65.36/sq mi (25.24/km^{2})
- FIPS code: 18-48654
- GNIS feature ID: 453619

Miami Township is one of fourteen townships in Cass County, Indiana. As of the 2020 census, its population was 1,311 (up from 1,292 at 2010) and contained 571 housing units.

== History ==
Miami Township was organized in 1831. It was named after the Miami people who once inhabited the area.

== Geography ==
Miami Township covers an area of 20.34 square miles (52.7 km^{2}); 0.28 square miles (0.73 km^{2}) (1.38 percent) of this is water.

=== Unincorporated towns ===
- Danes
- Lewisburg
- Miami Bend
- New Waverly
- Old Adamsboro

(This list is based on USGS data and may include former settlements.)

=== Adjacent townships ===
- Adams (north)
- Jefferson Township, Miami County (northeast)
- Peru Township, Miami County (east)
- Tipton (south)
- Washington (southwest)
- Clay (west)
- Eel (west)

=== Major highways ===
- U.S. Route 24

=== Cemeteries ===
The township contains four cemeteries: Ever Rest Memorial Gardens, Miami, Mount Calvary and Williams.
