= Tipton Township, Cass County, Indiana =

Tipton Township
- Township
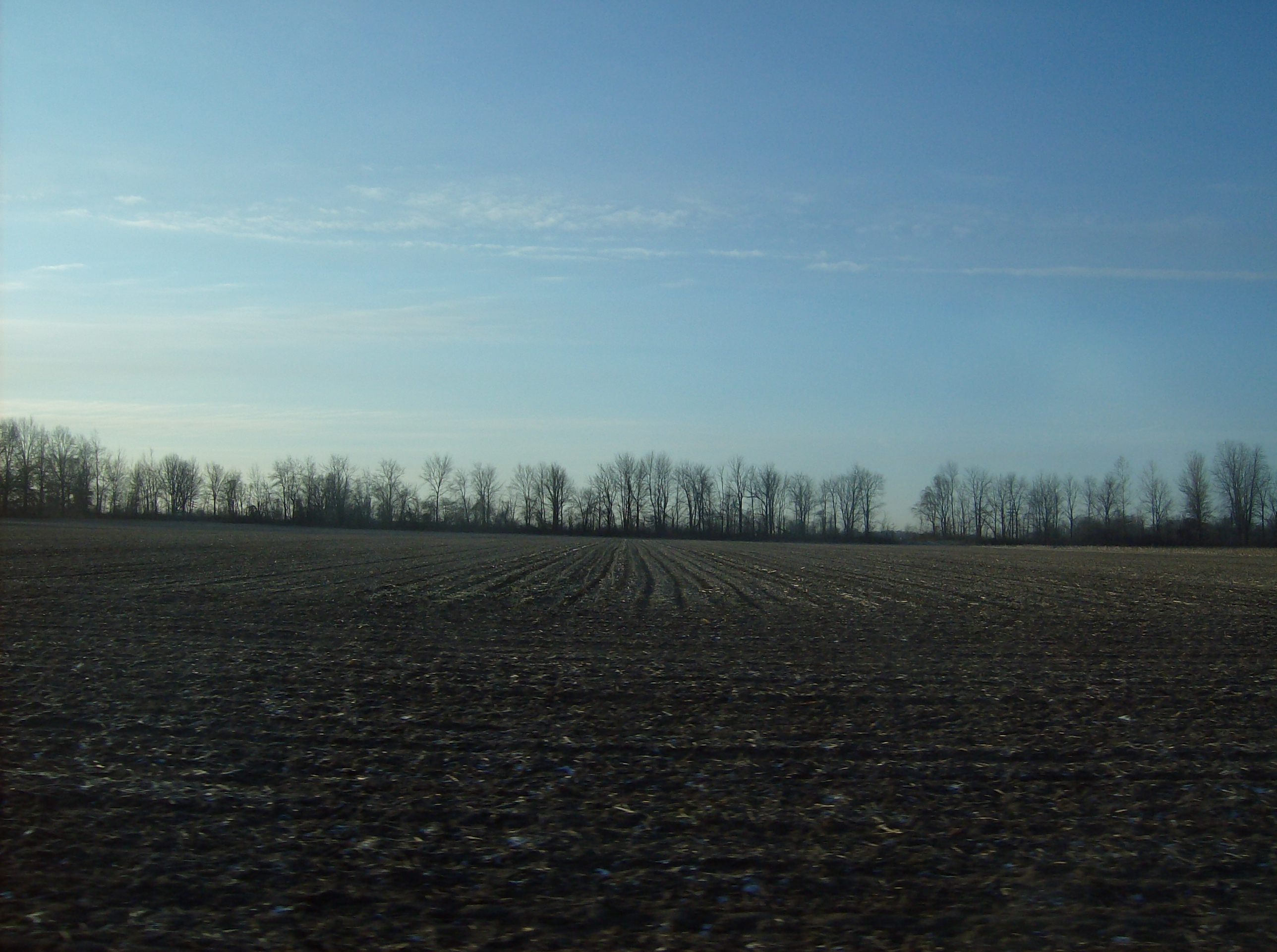
- Farmland in Tipton Township

- Location of Tipton Township in Cass County
- Coordinates: 40°41′54″N 86°13′06″W
- Country: United States
- State: Indiana
- County: Cass

Government
  - Type: Indiana township

Area
  - Total: 40.76 sq mi (105.58 km^{2})
  - Land: 40.63 sq mi (105.22 km^{2})
  - Water: 0.14 sq mi (0.36 km^{2})
- Elevation: 750 ft (230 m)

Population (2020)
  - Total: 2,304
  - Density: 56.71/sq mi (21.90/km^{2})
- FIPS code: 18-75968
- GNIS feature ID: 453899

Tipton Township is one of fourteen townships in Cass County, Indiana, United States. As of the 2020 census, its population was 2,304 (down from 2,490 at 2010) and contained 1,011 housing units.

== History ==
Tipton Township was organized in 1840. It was named for Indiana Senator John Tipton.

Pipe Creek Falls Resort was listed on the National Register of Historic Places in 1995.

== Geography ==
Tipton Township covers an area of 40.77 square miles (105.6 km^{2}); 0.14 square miles (0.36 km^{2}) (0.34 percent) of this is water.

=== Cities and towns ===
- Onward
- Walton

=== Adjacent townships ===
- Miami (north)
- Peru Township, Miami County (northeast)
- Pipe Creek Township, Miami County (east)
- Deer Creek Township, Miami County (southeast)
- Jackson (south)
- Deer Creek (southwest)
- Washington (west)

=== Major highways ===
- U.S. Route 35
- Indiana State Road 218

=== Cemeteries ===
The township contains five cemeteries: Bowyer, Little Deer Creek, Shaff, Venard and Walton.
