= List of public art in Cass County, Indiana =

This is a list of public art in Cass County, Indiana.

This list applies only to works of public art accessible in an outdoor public space. For example, this does not include artwork visible inside a museum.

Most of the works mentioned are sculptures. When this is not the case (e.g., sound installation,) it is stated next to the title.

== Galveston ==
Title	Artist	Year	Location/GPS Coordinates	Material	Dimensions	Owner	Image
Civil War Monument	Unknown	1919	Galveston Cemetery	Bronze	Statue: approx. 6 ft. x 22 in. x 22 in.	Galveston Cemetery Association	

== Logansport ==
Title	Artist	Year	Location/GPS Coordinates	Material	Dimensions	Owner	Image
Cass County Soldiers and Sailors Monument	Schuyler Powell	1887	Mt. Hope Cemetery	Limestone	Sculpture: approx. 12 x 6 x 4 1/2 ft.	Cass County	
Cass County World War I Memorial	Unknown	1929	City Hall	Limestone & Cement	Sculpture: approx. 68 x 22 x 22 in.	City of Logansport	
Elk's Rest	John G. Segesman	ca. 1890s	Mt. Hope Cemetery	Bronze	Sculpture: approx. 7 x 5 x 2 1/2 ft.	Mt. Hope Cemetery	
Knights of Pythias Monument	Unknown	After 1889	Mt. Hope Cemetery	Concrete	Sculpture: approx. 6 ft. x 2 ft. x 3 ft. 6 in.	Mt. Hope Cemetery	
Mary	Unknown	1946	All Saints Catholic School 40°45′11.92″N 86°22′8.09″W	Concrete	Sculpture: approx. 62 x 19 x 17 in.	All Saints Catholic Parish	
Reighter Monument	Unknown	ca. 1900	Mt. Hope Cemetery	Marble	Sculpture: approx. 6 ft. x 17 in. x 17 in.	Mt. Hope Cemetery	
Sacred Heart of Jesus	Daprato Statuary Company	1931	All Saints Catholic Parish	Bronze	Statue: approx. 5 ft. 8 in. x 4 ft. x 2 ft. 4 in.	All Saints Catholic Parish	
