= Metea, Indiana =

Metea
- Unincorporated community
- Cass County's location in Indiana

- Location in Cass County
- Coordinates: 40°52′09″N 86°18′34″W
- Country: United States
- State: Indiana
- County: Cass
- Township: Bethlehem
- Elevation: 784 ft (239 m)
- ZIP code: 46947
- GNIS feature ID: 439048

Metea is an unincorporated community in Bethlehem Township, Cass County, Indiana.

Metea was originally known as New Hamilton, and under the latter name laid out in 1853. It was later renamed Metea, in honor of Potawatomi Chief Metea.

Metea is located along Indiana State Road 25.
