= Georgetown, Cass County, Indiana =

Georgetown
- Unincorporated community
- Cass County's location in Indiana

- Location in Cass County
- Coordinates: 40°44′26″N 86°30′17″W
- Country: United States
- State: Indiana
- County: Cass
- Township: Jefferson
- Elevation: 587 ft (179 m)
- ZIP code: 46947
- FIPS code: 18-27306
- GNIS feature ID: 435024

Georgetown is an unincorporated community in Jefferson Township, Cass County, Indiana.

== History ==
Georgetown was laid out in 1835. It was probably named for the man who owned the town site, George Cicott.
