= Clymers, Indiana =

Clymers
- Unincorporated community
- Cass County's location in Indiana

- Location in Cass County
- Coordinates: 40°42′27″N 86°26′56″W
- Country: United States
- State: Indiana
- County: Cass
- Township: Clinton
- Elevation: 725 ft (221 m)
- ZIP code: 46947
- FIPS code: 18-13942
- GNIS feature ID: 432697

Clymers is an unincorporated community in Clinton Township, Cass County, Indiana.

== History ==
Clymers was laid out in 1869. It was named for its founder, George Clymer. A post office was established at Clymers in 1890, and remained in operation until it was discontinued in 1919.

== Geography ==
Indiana State Road 25 and the Norfolk Southern Railway both pass northeast through the town.
