= Hoover, Indiana =

Hoover
- Unincorporated community
- Cass County's location in Indiana

- Location in Cass County
- Coordinates: 40°48′32″N 86°12′02″W
- Country: United States
- State: Indiana
- County: Cass
- Township: Adams
- Elevation: 686 ft (209 m)
- ZIP code: 46947
- FIPS code: 18-34708
- GNIS feature ID: 436418

Hoover is an unincorporated community in Adams Township, Cass County, Indiana. As of June 2022 Hoover has an approximate population of 35 residents.

== History ==
Hoover had its start in the early 1870s by the building of the Eel River Railroad through that territory. It was named for its founder, Riley Hoover.

A post office was established at Hoover in 1873, and remained in operation until it was discontinued in 1928.
