= Bethlehem Township, Cass County, Indiana =

Bethlehem Township
- Township
- Location of Bethlehem Township in Cass County
- Coordinates: 40°52′03″N 86°18′13″W
- Country: United States
- State: Indiana
- County: Cass

Government
  - Type: Indiana township

Area
  - Total: 35.36 sq mi (91.6 km^{2})
  - Land: 35.31 sq mi (91.5 km^{2})
  - Water: 0.04 sq mi (0.10 km^{2})
- Elevation: 781 ft (238 m)

Population (2020)
  - Total: 745
  - Density: 22.5/sq mi (8.7/km^{2})
- FIPS code: 18-05086
- GNIS feature ID: 453108

Bethlehem Township is one of fourteen townships in Cass County, Indiana. As of the 2020 census, its population was 745 (down from 795 at 2010) and contained 322 housing units.

== History ==
Bethlehem Township was organized in 1836. It was named for an early settler's native hometown of Bethlehem, Pennsylvania.

== Geography ==
According to the 2010 census, the township has a total area of 35.36 square miles (91.6 km^{2}), of which 35.31 square miles (91.5 km^{2}) (or 99.86%) is land and 0.04 square miles (0.10 km^{2}) (or 0.11%) is water.

=== Unincorporated towns ===
- Metea

=== Adjacent townships ===
- Liberty Township, Fulton County (northeast)
- Adams (east)
- Clay (south)
- Noble (southwest)
- Harrison (west)
- Wayne Township, Fulton County (northwest)

=== Major highways ===
- Indiana State Road 16
- Indiana State Road 25
