= Adams Township, Cass County, Indiana =

Township in Indiana, United States

Adams Township
- Township
- Location of Adams Township in Cass County
- Coordinates: 40°50′54″N 86°12′57″W
- Country: United States
- State: Indiana
- County: Cass

Government
  - Type: Indiana township

Area
  - Total: 28.86 sq mi (74.7 km^{2})
  - Land: 28.75 sq mi (74.5 km^{2})
  - Water: 0.11 sq mi (0.28 km^{2})
- Elevation: 790 ft (240 m)

Population (2020)
  - Total: 886
  - Density: 31.1/sq mi (12.0/km^{2})
- Time zone: UTC-5 (Eastern (EST))
  - Summer (DST): UTC-4 (EDT)
- FIPS code: 18-00334
- GNIS feature ID: 0453075

Adams Township is one of fourteen townships in Cass County, Indiana, United States. As of the 2020 census, its population was 886 (down from 895 at 2010) and it contained 377 housing units.

== History ==
Adams Township was organized in 1835. It was named for John Quincy Adams, sixth President of the United States.

== Geography ==
According to the 2010 census, the township has a total area of 28.86 square miles (74.7 km^{2}), of which 28.75 square miles (74.5 km^{2}) (or 99.62%) is land and 0.11 square miles (0.28 km^{2}) (or 0.38%) is water.

=== Unincorporated towns ===
- Hoover
- Little Charlie
- Twelve Mile

(This list is based on USGS data and may include former settlements.)

=== Adjacent townships ===
- Liberty Township, Fulton County (north)
- Union Township, Miami County (northeast)
- Jefferson Township, Miami County (east)
- Miami (south)
- Clay (southwest)
- Bethlehem (west)

=== Major highways ===
- Indiana State Road 16

=== Cemeteries ===
The township contains one cemetery, Mount Carmel.
