= Lewisburg, Indiana =

Lewisburg
- Unincorporated community
- Cass County's location in Indiana

- Location in Cass County
- Coordinates: 40°44′48″N 86°13′03″W
- Country: United States
- State: Indiana
- County: Cass
- Township: Miami
- Founded: 1835
- Named after: Lewis Boyer
- Elevation: 679 ft (207 m)
- Time zone: UTC−5 (Eastern)
  - Summer (DST): UTC-4 (EDT)
- ZIP code: 46970
- FIPS code: 18-43038
- GNIS feature ID: 437807

Lewisburg is an unincorporated community in Miami Township, Cass County, Indiana.

== History ==
Lewisburg had its start in the year 1835 by the building of the Wabash and Erie Canal through that territory. It was named for its founder, Lewis Bowyer (or Boyer).

A post office was established at Lewisburg in 1835, and remained in operation until 1868.
