= Noble Township, Cass County, Indiana =

Noble Township
- Township
- Location of Noble Township in Cass County
- Coordinates: 40°47′19″N 86°25′07″W
- Country: United States
- State: Indiana
- County: Cass

Government
  - Type: Indiana township

Area
  - Total: 26.20 sq mi (67.87 km^{2})
  - Land: 26.05 sq mi (67.47 km^{2})
  - Water: 0.15 sq mi (0.4 km^{2})
- Elevation: 751 ft (229 m)

Population (2020)
  - Total: 1,889
  - Density: 72.51/sq mi (28.00/km^{2})
- FIPS code: 18-54054
- GNIS feature ID: 453669

Noble Township is one of fourteen townships in Cass County, Indiana. As of the 2020 census, its population was 1,889 (down from 1,960 at 2010) and contained 816 housing units.

== History ==
Noble Township was organized in 1836. It was named for Noah Noble, fifth Governor of Indiana.

== Geography ==
Noble Township covers an area of 26.21 square miles (67.9 km^{2}); 0.16 square miles (0.41 km^{2}) (0.61 percent) of this is water.

=== Cities and towns ===
- Logansport (west edge)

=== Unincorporated towns ===
- Verona

(This list is based on USGS data and may include former settlements.)

=== Adjacent townships ===
- Harrison (north)
- Bethlehem (northeast)
- Clay (east)
- Eel (southeast)
- Clinton (southwest)
- Jefferson (west)
- Boone (northwest)

=== Major highways ===
- U.S. Route 24
- U.S. Route 35
- Indiana State Road 17

=== Cemeteries ===
The township contains three cemeteries: East Sand Ridge, Harper and Horney.
