= Deer Creek Township, Cass County, Indiana =

Deer Creek Township
- Township
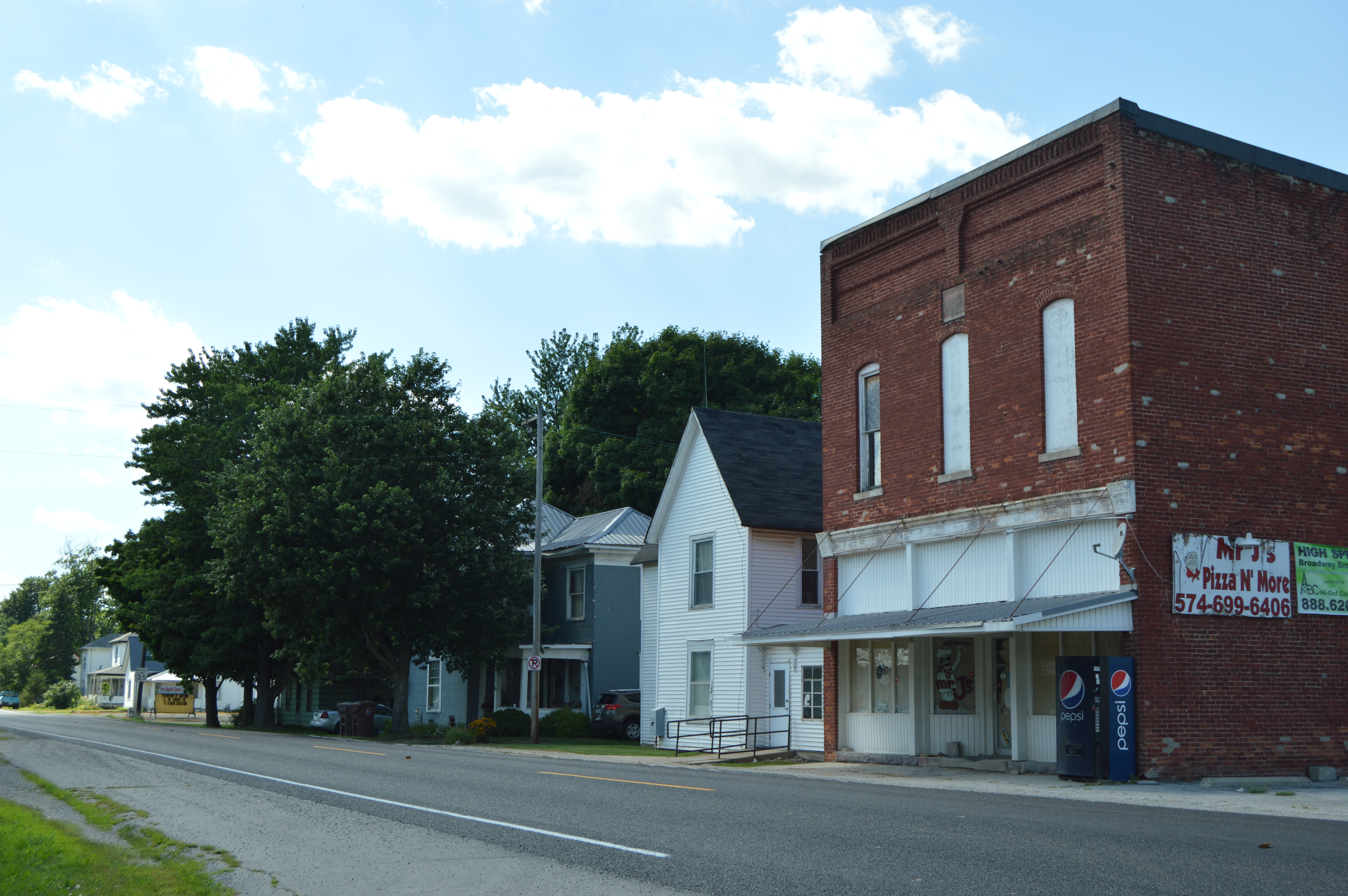
- Street scene in Young America

- Location of Deer Creek Township in Cass County
- Coordinates: 40°36′13″N 86°18′38″W
- Country: United States
- State: Indiana
- County: Cass

Government
  - Type: Indiana township

Area
  - Total: 36.13 sq mi (93.6 km^{2})
  - Land: 36.13 sq mi (93.6 km^{2})
  - Water: 0 sq mi (0 km^{2})
- Elevation: 748 ft (228 m)

Population (2020)
  - Total: 897
  - Density: 25.2/sq mi (9.7/km^{2})
- FIPS code: 18-17254
- GNIS feature ID: 453258

Deer Creek Township is one of fourteen townships in Cass County, Indiana. As of the 2020 census, its population was 897 (down from 912 at 2010) and contained 374 housing units.

== History ==
Deer Creek Township was organized in 1842. Deer Creek Township was named from Deer Creek, which was named from herds of wild deer that were often seen near its banks.

== Geography ==
According to the 2010 census, the township has a total area of 36.13 square miles (93.6 km^{2}), all land.

=== Unincorporated towns ===
- Deacon
- Young America

=== Adjacent townships ===
- Washington (north)
- Tipton (northeast)
- Jackson (east)
- Ervin Township, Howard County (south)
- Carrollton Township, Carroll County (southwest)
- Washington Township, Carroll County (northwest)

=== Major highways ===
- Indiana State Road 18

=== Cemeteries ===
The township contains three cemeteries: Harness, Hoover-Snider and Miller.
