= Onward, Indiana =

- Town
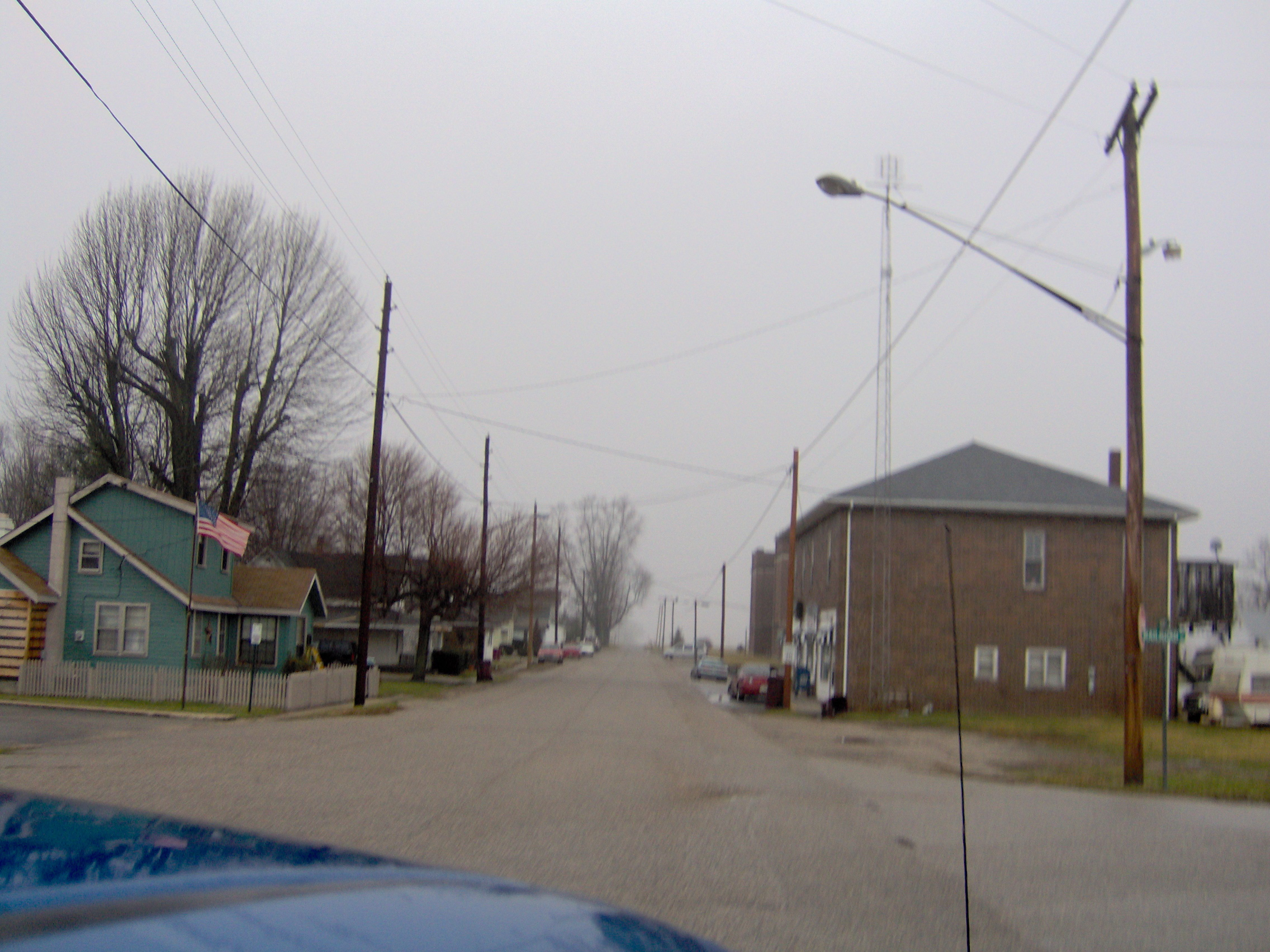
- View of Onward's central street.

- Location of Onward in Cass County, Indiana.
- Coordinates: 40°41′41″N 86°11′41″W
- Country: United States
- State: Indiana
- County: Cass
- Township: Tipton

Area
  - Total: 0.10 sq mi (0.27 km^{2})
  - Land: 0.10 sq mi (0.27 km^{2})
  - Water: 0 sq mi (0.00 km^{2})
- Elevation: 768 ft (234 m)

Population (2020)
  - Total: 76
  - Density: 734.7/sq mi (283.66/km^{2})
- Time zone: UTC-5 (Eastern (EST))
  - Summer (DST): UTC-4 (EDT)
- ZIP code: 46967
- Area code: 574
- FIPS code: 18-56664
- GNIS feature ID: 2396833

Onward is a town in Tipton Township, Cass County, Indiana, United States. As of the 2020 census, Onward had a population of 76.

== History ==
Onward was laid out in 1869. According to tradition, the local men frequented the local country store; going home meant they went "onward".

== Geography ==
According to the 2010 census, Onward has a total area of 0.1 square miles (0.26 km^{2}), all land.

== Demographics ==
Historical population
Census	Pop.	Note	%±
1930	135		—
1940	127		−5.9%
1950	140		10.2%
1960	153		9.3%
1970	111		−27.5%
1980	121		9.0%
1990	63		−47.9%
2000	81		28.6%
2010	100		23.5%
2020	76		−24.0%
U.S. Decennial Census

=== 2010 census ===
As of the census of 2010, there were 100 people, 39 households, and 28 families living in the town. The population density was 1,000.0 inhabitants per square mile (386.1/km^{2}). There were 44 housing units at an average density of 440.0 per square mile (169.9/km^{2}). The racial makeup of the town was 98.0% White and 2.0% Asian.

There were 39 households, of which 38.5% had children under the age of 18 living with them, 41.0% were married couples living together, 23.1% had a female householder with no husband present, 7.7% had a male householder with no wife present, and 28.2% were non-families. 23.1% of all households were made up of individuals, and 12.9% had someone living alone who was 65 years of age or older. The average household size was 2.56 and the average family size was 2.93.

The median age in the town was 32 years. 32% of residents were under the age of 18; 7% were between the ages of 18 and 24; 29% were from 25 to 44; 18% were from 45 to 64; and 14% were 65 years of age or older. The gender makeup of the town was 51.0% male and 49.0% female.

=== 2000 census ===
As of the census of 2000, there were 81 people, 30 households, and 21 families living in the town. The population density was 935.6 inhabitants per square mile (361.2/km^{2}). There were 31 housing units at an average density of 358.1 per square mile (138.3/km^{2}). The racial makeup of the town was 96.30% White and 3.70% Asian.

There were 30 households, out of which 36.7% had children under the age of 18 living with them, 70.0% were married couples living together, 3.3% had a female householder with no husband present, and 26.7% were non-families. 26.7% of all households were made up of individuals, and 6.7% had someone living alone who was 65 years of age or older. The average household size was 2.70 and the average family size was 3.32.

In the town, the population was spread out, with 30.9% under the age of 18, 3.7% from 18 to 24, 34.6% from 25 to 44, 17.3% from 45 to 64, and 13.6% who were 65 years of age or older. The median age was 32 years. For every 100 females, there were 97.6 males. For every 100 females age 18 and over, there were 115.4 males.

The median income for a household in the town was $40,625, and the median income for a family was $50,313. Males had a median income of $36,458 versus $35,625 for females. The per capita income for the town was $15,993. There were no families and 6.6% of the population living below the poverty line, including no under eighteens and 30.8% of those over 64.
