= Jalen Adaway =

American basketball player (born 1998)

Tindastóll
- Position: Shooting guard
- League: Úrvalsdeild karla

Personal information
- Born: July 9, 1998 (age 28) Logansport, Indiana, U.S.
- Listed height: 6 ft 5 in (1.96 m)
- Listed weight: 215 lb (98 kg)

Career information
- High school: Logansport (Logansport, Indiana)
- College: Miami (Ohio) (2017–2019); St. Bonaventure (2020–2022)
- NBA draft: 2022: undrafted
- Playing career: 2022–present

Career history
- 2022–2023: Austin Spurs
- 2023–2024: Levickí Patrioti
- 2024: Scarborough Shooting Stars
- 2024: Fuerza Regia de Monterrey
- 2025: San Diego Clippers
- 2025: Halcones de Ciudad Obregón
- 2025–2026: Instituto Atletico Central Cordoba
- 2026–present: Tindastóll

Career highlights
- First-team All-Atlantic 10 (2022)
- Stats at NBA.com
- Stats at Basketball Reference

Jalen Tyler Adaway (born July 9, 1998) is an American professional basketball player for Instituto Atletico Central Cordoba. He played college basketball for the Miami RedHawks and the St. Bonaventure Bonnies.

== High school career ==
Adaway attended Logansport High School. He averaged 15.7 points, eight rebounds, 3.4 assists, 2.5 blocks and 1.1 steals per game as a senior to lead the Berries to a 23–2 record. Adaway was named to the Indiana All-Star team. He posted 1,446 points and 655 rebounds in his career. Adaway committed to playing college basketball for Miami (Ohio).

== College career ==
As a freshman, Adaway averaged 8.5 points and five rebounds per game. He averaged 7.5 points and five rebounds per game as a sophomore. Following the season, he transferred to St. Bonaventure and sat out a year per NCAA regulations. Adaway averaged 12.2 points and six rebounds per game as a junior, helping the Bonnies to win their first Atlantic 10 Conference Tournament since 2012 and receive an automatic berth to the NCAA Tournament. As a senior, he averaged 15.3 points and 5.9 rebounds per game while shooting a career-high 37.6% from three-point range, earning First Team All-Atlantic 10 honors. Adaway decided to forgo his final season of college eligibility granted due to the COVID-19 pandemic and turn professional.

== Professional career ==
After not being selected in the 2022 NBA draft, Adaway joined the Miami Heat for the 2022 NBA Summer League. He signed an Exhibit 10 deal with the San Antonio Spurs on August 31, 2022. Adaway subsequently joined the Austin Spurs.

In April 2023, the NBA G League announced that Adaway had been dismissed and disqualified from the league for violating the terms of the NBA G League Anti-Drug program.

On July 12, 2023, Adaway signed with BK Patrioti Levice of the Slovak Basketball League. After the season, Adaway was selected as All-Slovakian Nike SBL Guard of the Year and First Team.

In May 2024, Adaway joined the Scarborough Shooting Stars of the Canadian Elite Basketball League.

On September 12, 2024, Adaway signed with the Fuerza Regia de Monterrey of the Liga Nacional de Baloncesto Profesional. Adaway was awarded Latinbasket.com All-Mexican LNBP First Team for the 2024 season.

On January 6, 2025, Adaway joined the San Diego Clippers.

On September 25, 2025, he signed with Instituto Atletico Central Cordoba.

In July 2026, he signed with Tindastóll in Iceland.

== Personal life ==
Adaway is the son of Aja Mallory.
