= Clinton Township, Cass County, Indiana =

Clinton Township
- Township
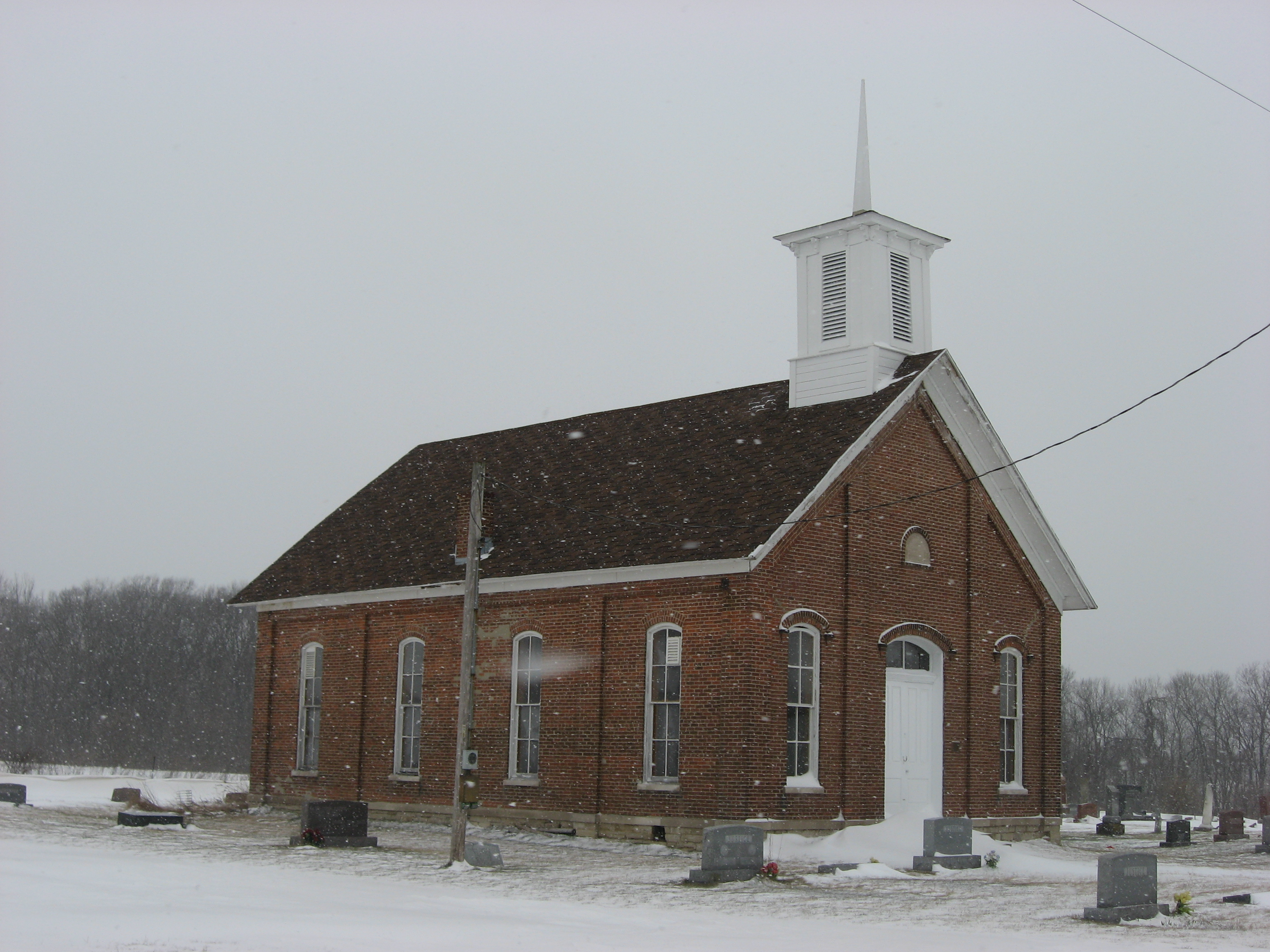
- Pleasant Hill Church, a historic site in the township

- Location of Clinton Township in Cass County
- Coordinates: 40°43′28″N 86°27′22″W
- Country: United States
- State: Indiana
- County: Cass

Government
  - Type: Indiana township

Area
  - Total: 25.13 sq mi (65.1 km^{2})
  - Land: 24.75 sq mi (64.1 km^{2})
  - Water: 0.38 sq mi (0.98 km^{2})
- Elevation: 720 ft (220 m)

Population (2020)
  - Total: 646
  - Density: 33/sq mi (13/km^{2})
- FIPS code: 18-13690
- GNIS feature ID: 453229

Clinton Township is one of fourteen townships in Cass County, Indiana, United States. As of the 2020 census, its population was 646 (down from 816 at 2010) and contained 226 housing units.

== History ==
Clinton Township was organized in 1834. It was named for DeWitt Clinton, sixth Governor of New York.

== Geography ==
According to the 2010 census, the township has a total area of 25.13 square miles (65.1 km^{2}), of which 24.75 square miles (64.1 km^{2}) (or 98.49%) is land and 0.38 square miles (0.98 km^{2}) (or 1.51%) is water.

=== Cities and towns ===
- Logansport (west edge)

=== Unincorporated towns ===
- Clymers

=== Adjacent townships ===
- Noble (northeast)
- Eel (east)
- Washington (east)
- Washington Township, Carroll County (southeast)
- Liberty Township, Carroll County (southwest)
- Adams Township, Carroll County (west)
- Jefferson (northwest)

=== Major highways ===
- U.S. Route 35
- Indiana State Road 25

=== Cemeteries ===
The township contains four cemeteries: Clymers, Porter, Saint Johns and Shideler.
