= Pipe Creek Falls Resort =

Historic district in Indiana, United States

- U.S. National Register of Historic Places
- U.S. Historic district
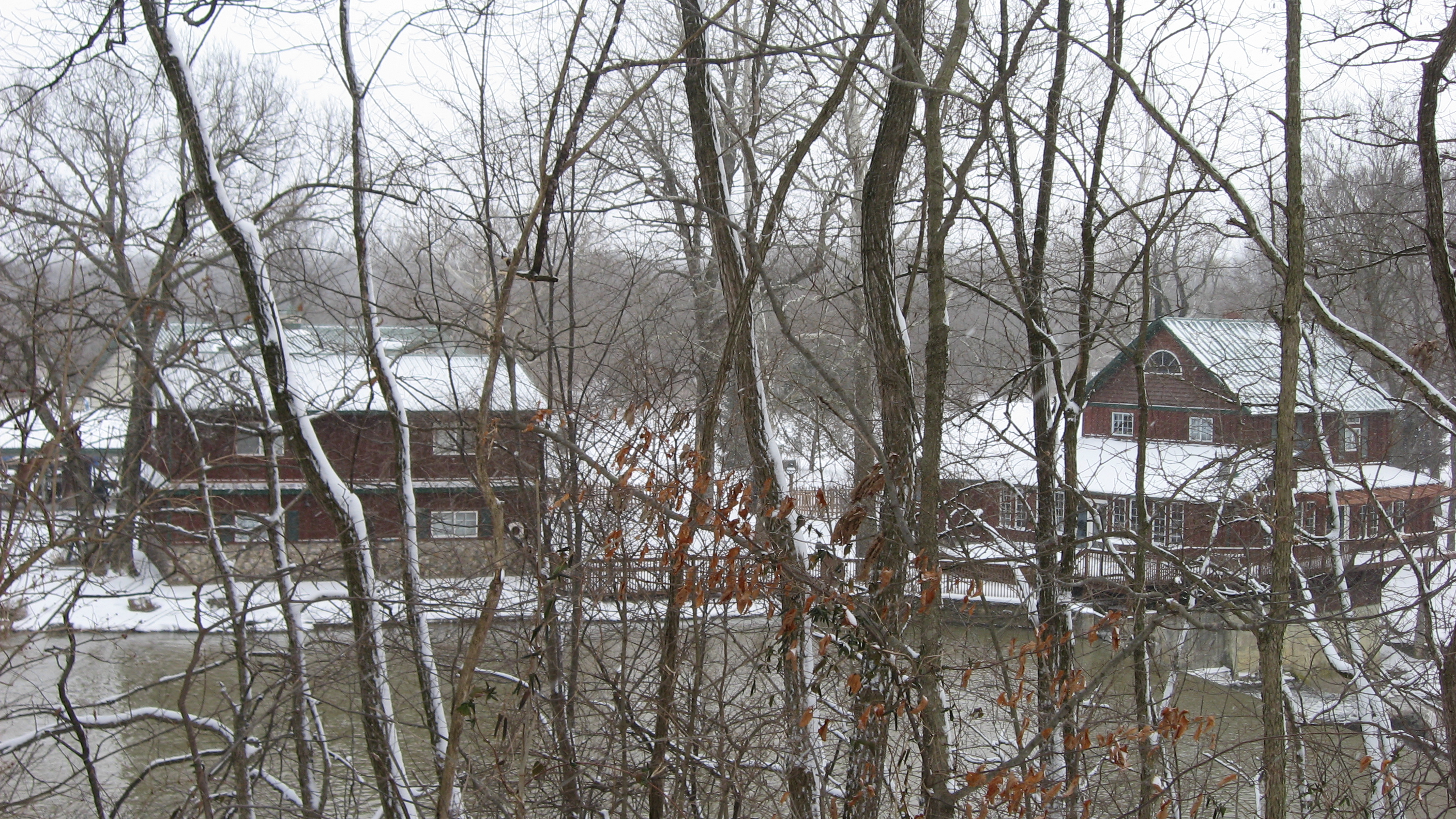
- Pipe Creek Falls Resort, January 2012

- Location within Cass County, Indiana Location within Indiana Location within the United States
- Location: Junction of County Roads 850E and 275S at Pipe Creek, north of Walton, Tipton Township, Cass County, Indiana
- Coordinates: 40°43′36″N 86°13′2″W
- Area: 7.5 acres (3.0 ha)
- Built: 1888
- Built by: Bowyer, Charles Lewis
- Architectural style: Bungalow/craftsman
- NRHP reference No.: 95001105
- Added to NRHP: September 14, 1995

Pipe Creek Falls Resort is a national historic district located at Tipton Township, Cass County, Indiana. The district encompasses five contributing buildings, one contributing site, and two contributing structures associated with a recreational site and campground on a wooded site overlooking Pipe Creek. It developed between about 1888 and 1940 and includes notable examples of Bungalow / American Craftsman style architecture. Notable contributing resources include the Pipe Creek Grist Mill (1914), generator shed (1914), bath house (1914), storage shed (1940), restroom (1940), concession stand (1940), the foundation of a carousel, and rock shelters.

It was listed on the National Register of Historic Places in 1995.
