= Cass County, Indiana =

County in Indiana, United States

- County
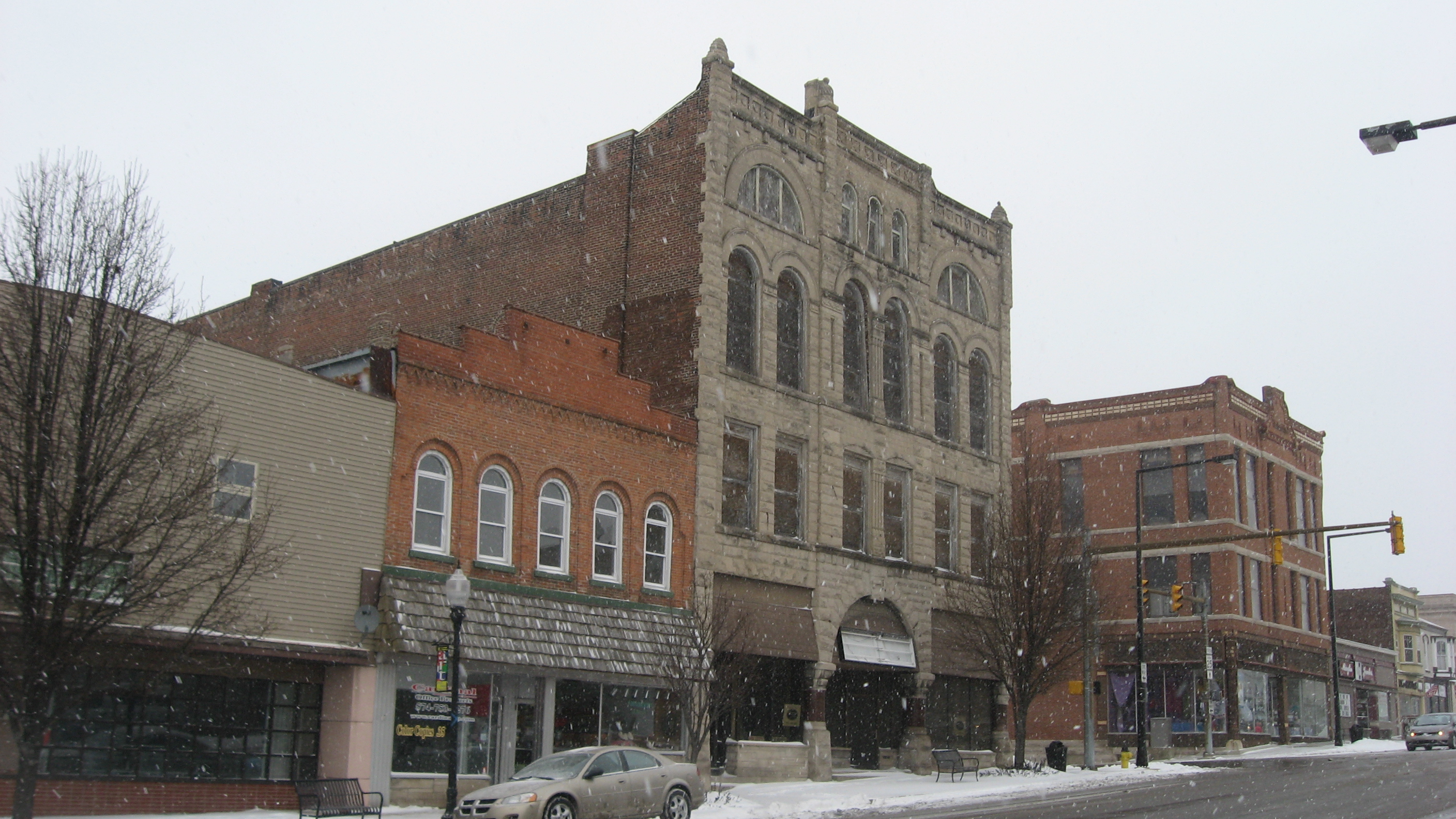
- Courthouse Historic District (Logansport)

- Flag Seal

- Location within the U.S. state of Indiana
- Coordinates: 40°46′N 86°21′W
- Country: United States
- State: Indiana
- Founded: 1829
- Named for: Lewis Cass
- Seat: Logansport
- Largest city: Logansport

Area
  - Total: 414.85 sq mi (1,074.5 km^{2})
  - Land: 412.16 sq mi (1,067.5 km^{2})
  - Water: 2.69 sq mi (7.0 km^{2}) 0.65%

Population (2020)
  - Total: 37,870
  - Estimate (2025): 37,836 ▼
  - Density: 91.88/sq mi (35.48/km^{2})
- Time zone: UTC−5 (Eastern)
  - Summer (DST): UTC−4 (EDT)
- Congressional districts: 4th, 2nd
- Website: www.in.gov/counties/cass/
- Indiana county number 9

Cass County is a county located in the U.S. state of Indiana. As of the 2020 United States census, its population was 37,870. The county seat is Logansport. Cass County comprises the Logansport, IN Micropolitan Statistical Area.

== History ==
Cass County was formed in 1829. It is named for Gen. Lewis Cass, 2nd Territorial Governor of Michigan and later U.S. Secretary of War under President Andrew Jackson.

== Geography ==
According to the 2010 census, the county has a total area of 414.85 square miles (1,074.5 km^{2}) of which 412.16 square miles (1,067.5 km^{2}) (or 99.35%) is land and 2.69 square miles (7.0 km^{2}) (or 0.65%) is water. The Wabash River flows westward through the county, and is joined by the Eel River in Logansport.

=== Adjacent counties ===
- Fulton County - north
- Miami County - east
- Howard County - south
- Carroll County - southwest
- White County - west
- Pulaski County - northwest

=== City ===
- Logansport

=== Towns ===
- Galveston
- Onward
- Royal Center
- Walton

=== Census-designated place ===
- Grissom AFB (mostly in Miami Co.)

=== Unincorporated places ===
- Adamsboro
- Anoka
- Clymers
- Deacon
- Dunkirk
- Georgetown
- Hoover
- Lake Cicott
- Lewisburg
- Lincoln
- Lucerne
- Metea
- Miami Bend
- New Waverly
- Potawatomi Point
- Twelve Mile
- Young America

=== Extinct towns ===
- Circleville
- Taberville (absorbed into Logansport)
- Kenneth

=== Townships ===
- Adams
- Bethlehem
- Boone
- Clay
- Clinton
- Deer Creek
- Eel
- Harrison
- Jackson
- Jefferson
- Miami
- Noble
- Tipton
- Washington

=== Transit ===
- Cass Area Transit

=== Major highways ===
- U.S. Route 24
- U.S. Route 35
- Indiana State Road 16
- Indiana State Road 17
- Indiana State Road 18
- Indiana State Road 25
- Indiana State Road 29
- Indiana State Road 218

=== Railroads ===
- Norfolk Southern Railway
- Winamac Southern Railroad
- Logansport and Eel River Shortline Company
- Toledo, Peoria and Western Railway

== Climate and weather ==
Logansport, Indiana

Climate chart (precipitation, max. and min. temperature)
J	F	M	A	M	J	J	A	S	O	N	D
1.7 33 14	1.5 38 18	2.6 49 28	3.1 61 38	3.8 73 49	3.9 82 59	3.5 85 63	3.6 83 61	3.3 77 53	2.7 65 41	3.4 51 31	2.7 38 21
- █ Average max. and min. temperatures in °F
- █ Precipitation totals in inches
- Source: The Weather Channel
Metric conversion
J	F	M	A	M	J	J	A	S	O	N	D
44 1 −10	39 3 −8	66 9 −2	79 16 3	97 23 9	99 28 15	88 29 17	92 28 16	85 25 12	69 18 5	87 11 −1	69 3 −6
- █ Average max. and min. temperatures in °C
- █ Precipitation totals in mm

In recent years, average temperatures in Logansport have ranged from a low of 14 °F (−10 °C) in January to a high of 85 °F (29 °C) in July, although a record low of −24 °F (−31 °C) was recorded in January 1985 and a record high of 104 °F (40 °C) was recorded in June 1988. Average monthly precipitation ranged from 1.53 inches (39 mm) in February to 3.89 inches (99 mm) in June.

== Government ==
The county government is a constitutional body, and is granted specific powers by the Constitution of Indiana, and by the Indiana Code.

County Council: The legislative branch of the county government; controls spending and revenue collection in the county. Representatives are elected to four-year terms from county districts. They are responsible for setting salaries, the annual budget, and special spending. The council has limited authority to impose local taxes, in the form of an income and property tax that is subject to state level approval, excise taxes, and service taxes.

Board of Commissioners: The executive body of the county; commissioners are elected county-wide to staggered four-year terms. One commissioner serves as president. The commissioners execute acts legislated by the council, collect revenue, and manage the day-to-day functions of the county government.

Court: The county maintains a small claims court that can handle some civil cases. The judge on the court is elected to four-year terms, and must be a member of the Indiana Bar Association. The judge is assisted by a constable who is also elected to a four-year term. In some cases, court decisions can be appealed to the state level circuit court.

County Officials: The county has several other elected offices, including sheriff, coroner, auditor, treasurer, recorder, surveyor, and circuit court clerk. They are elected to four-year terms. Members elected to county government positions are required to declare a party affiliation and to be residents of the county.

Most of Cass County is in Indiana's 4th congressional district; the extreme eastern edge is part of Indiana's 2nd congressional district. It is also part of Indiana Senate district 18 and Indiana House of Representatives districts 16 and 24.

United States presidential election results for Cass County, Indiana
Year	Republican		Democratic		Third party(ies)	
Year	No.	%	No.	%	No.	%
1888	3,822	46.34%	4,221	51.18%	205	2.49%
1892	3,501	42.42%	4,006	48.53%	747	9.05%
1896	4,392	46.88%	4,851	51.78%	126	1.34%
1900	4,308	46.32%	4,672	50.24%	320	3.44%
1904	5,282	52.09%	4,357	42.96%	502	4.95%
1908	4,700	45.44%	5,234	50.60%	410	3.96%
1912	1,573	16.54%	4,421	46.48%	3,517	36.98%
1916	4,879	47.08%	5,140	49.60%	344	3.32%
1920	9,545	52.12%	8,194	44.74%	575	3.14%
1924	9,939	55.89%	5,276	29.67%	2,568	14.44%
1928	10,522	61.31%	6,522	38.00%	119	0.69%
1932	7,980	41.46%	10,987	57.08%	281	1.46%
1936	8,528	43.91%	10,475	53.93%	419	2.16%
1940	10,057	49.33%	10,268	50.37%	61	0.30%
1944	9,788	52.89%	8,615	46.55%	103	0.56%
1948	9,105	46.97%	10,086	52.03%	194	1.00%
1952	12,296	60.32%	7,982	39.16%	107	0.52%
1956	12,624	62.19%	7,594	37.41%	81	0.40%
1960	11,392	58.19%	8,091	41.33%	94	0.48%
1964	7,735	40.76%	11,148	58.74%	95	0.50%
1968	9,441	51.54%	7,142	38.99%	1,735	9.47%
1972	12,681	69.77%	5,317	29.25%	178	0.98%
1976	10,342	56.73%	7,610	41.74%	279	1.53%
1980	11,500	62.93%	5,838	31.95%	936	5.12%
1984	12,355	68.75%	5,521	30.72%	95	0.53%
1988	10,970	65.10%	5,784	34.32%	97	0.58%
1992	7,421	45.70%	4,757	29.30%	4,059	25.00%
1996	8,020	51.28%	5,419	34.65%	2,202	14.08%
2000	9,305	61.60%	5,412	35.83%	389	2.58%
2004	9,480	68.05%	4,315	30.97%	136	0.98%
2008	8,346	53.32%	7,011	44.79%	296	1.89%
2012	8,443	59.62%	5,371	37.93%	347	2.45%
2016	9,701	68.27%	3,759	26.46%	749	5.27%
2020	10,552	69.43%	4,304	28.32%	342	2.25%
2024	10,285	72.36%	3,722	26.19%	206	1.45%

== Demographics ==
Historical population
Census	Pop.	Note	%±
1830	1,162		—
1840	5,480		371.6%
1850	11,021		101.1%
1860	16,843		52.8%
1870	24,193		43.6%
1880	27,611		14.1%
1890	31,152		12.8%
1900	34,545		10.9%
1910	36,368		5.3%
1920	38,333		5.4%
1930	34,518		−10.0%
1940	36,908		6.9%
1950	38,793		5.1%
1960	40,931		5.5%
1970	40,456		−1.2%
1980	40,936		1.2%
1990	38,413		−6.2%
2000	40,930		6.6%
2010	38,966		−4.8%
2020	37,870		−2.8%
2025 (est.)	37,836	▼	−0.1%
US Decennial Census; 1790-1960 1900-1990; 1990-2000 2010

=== Racial and ethnic composition ===
Cass County, Indiana – Racial and ethnic composition Note: the US Census treats Hispanic/Latino as an ethnic category. This table excludes Latinos from the racial categories and assigns them to a separate category. Hispanics/Latinos may be of any race.
Race / Ethnicity (NH = Non-Hispanic)	Pop 1980	Pop 1990	Pop 2000	Pop 2010	Pop 2020	% 1980	% 1990	% 2000	% 2010	% 2020
White alone (NH)	40,290	37,608	36,921	32,624	28,744	98.42%	97.90%	90.21%	83.72%	75.90%
Black or African American alone (NH)	317	324	499	519	560	0.77%	0.84%	1.22%	1.33%	1.48%
Native American or Alaska Native alone (NH)	50	137	90	100	109	0.12%	0.36%	0.22%	0.26%	0.29%
Asian alone (NH)	74	103	204	407	573	0.18%	0.27%	0.50%	1.04%	1.51%
Native Hawaiian or Pacific Islander alone (NH)	x	x	10	3	8	x	x	0.02%	0.01%	0.02%
Other race alone (NH)	20	11	19	48	76	0.05%	0.03%	0.05%	0.12%	0.20%
Mixed race or Multiracial (NH)	x	x	282	368	1,125	x	x	0.69%	0.94%	2.97%
Hispanic or Latino (any race)	185	230	2,905	4,897	6,675	0.45%	0.60%	7.10%	12.57%	17.63%
Total	40,936	38,413	40,930	38,966	37,870	100.00%	100.00%	100.00%	100.00%	100.00%

=== 2020 census ===
As of the 2020 census, the county had a population of 37,870. The median age was 40.6 years. 24.2% of residents were under the age of 18 and 18.5% of residents were 65 years of age or older. For every 100 females there were 98.5 males, and for every 100 females age 18 and over there were 96.7 males age 18 and over.

The racial makeup of the county was 79.5% White, 1.6% Black or African American, 1.1% American Indian and Alaska Native, 1.5% Asian, <0.1% Native Hawaiian and Pacific Islander, 8.9% from some other race, and 7.3% from two or more races. Hispanic or Latino residents of any race comprised 17.6% of the population.

53.8% of residents lived in urban areas, while 46.2% lived in rural areas.

There were 14,900 households in the county, of which 30.7% had children under the age of 18 living in them. Of all households, 47.4% were married-couple households, 18.8% were households with a male householder and no spouse or partner present, and 26.2% were households with a female householder and no spouse or partner present. About 28.9% of all households were made up of individuals and 13.5% had someone living alone who was 65 years of age or older.

There were 16,379 housing units, of which 9.0% were vacant. Among occupied housing units, 72.6% were owner-occupied and 27.4% were renter-occupied. The homeowner vacancy rate was 1.9% and the rental vacancy rate was 10.5%.

=== 2010 census ===
As of the 2010 United States census, there were 38,966 people, 14,858 households, and 10,144 families in the county. The population density was 94.5 inhabitants per square mile (36.5/km^{2}). There were 16,474 housing units at an average density of 40.0 per square mile (15.4/km^{2}). The racial makeup of the county was 88.2% white, 1.5% black or African American, 1.1% Asian, 0.5% American Indian, 0.1% Pacific islander, 7.0% from other races, and 1.6% from two or more races. Those of Hispanic or Latino origin made up 12.6% of the population. In terms of ancestry, 24.0% were German, 15.0% were American, 11.8% were Irish, and 9.0% were English.

Of the 14,858 households, 33.3% had children under the age of 18 living with them, 51.8% were married couples living together, 11.3% had a female householder with no husband present, 31.7% were non-families, and 27.3% of all households were made up of individuals. The average household size was 2.55 and the average family size was 3.08. The median age was 38.7 years.

The median income for a household in the county was $47,697 and the median income for a family was $49,873. Males had a median income of $37,823 versus $26,938 for females. The per capita income for the county was $20,562. About 9.8% of families and 14.0% of the population were below the poverty line, including 18.7% of those under age 18 and 8.0% of those age 65 or over.

== Notable people ==
- Rollie Zeider (1883–1967), major league baseball player (1910–1918); born in Hoover.
- Film actor Greg Kinnear was born in Logansport.
- Cpl. Humberto Sanchez (1998–2021) a U.S. Marine who was among the 13 service members killed in the 2021 Bombing of the Kabul Hamid Karzai International Airport.

== Education ==
School districts which cover portions of the county include: Caston School Corporation, Logansport Community School Corporation, Pioneer Regional School Corporation, the Southeastern School Corporation.

High Schools and Middle Schools

- 6th Grade Academy
- Lewis Cass High School
- Logansport Junior High School
- Logansport High School
- Pioneer Junior-Senior High School

Elementary Schools

- Columbia Elementary School
- Fairview Elementary School
- Franklin Elementary School
- Galveston Elementary School
- Landis Elementary School
- Pioneer Elementary School
- Thompson Elementary School

== See also ==
- List of public art in Cass County, Indiana
- National Register of Historic Places listings in Cass County, Indiana
