= Pleasant Hill Church (Clinton, Indiana) =

Historic church in Indiana, United States

- U.S. National Register of Historic Places
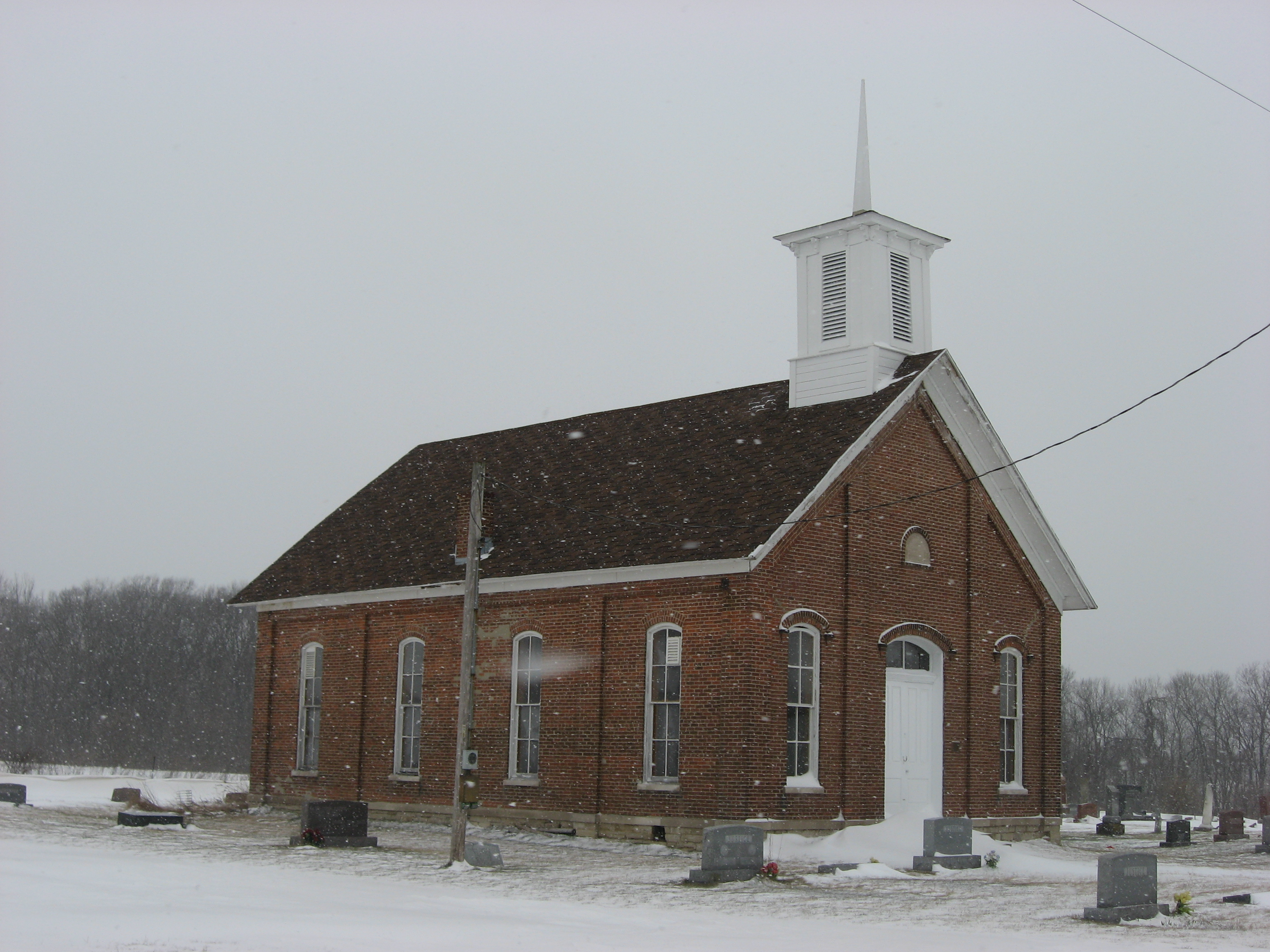

- Location within Cass County, Indiana Location within Indiana Location within the United States
- Location: Junction of County Roads 400S and 675W, southwest of Logansport, Clinton Township, Cass County, Indiana
- Coordinates: 40°42′44″N 86°30′6″W
- Area: less than one acre
- Built: 1875
- Architectural style: Italianate
- NRHP reference No.: 95001539
- Added to NRHP: January 11, 1996

Pleasant Hill Church, also known as Keeps Creek Church, is a historic one-room country church located at the junction of County Roads 400S and 675W, in Clinton Township, Cass County, Indiana. It was built in 1875, and is a red brick building, with Italianate style design elements. It has a front gable roof and white clapboard belfry. It measures 50 feet by 33 feet. It was originally used as a meeting place for three different denominations.

It was listed on the National Register of Historic Places in 1995.
