= Anoka, Indiana =

Anoka
- Unincorporated community and Census-designated place
- Cass County's location in Indiana

- Location in Cass County
- Coordinates: 40°43′25″N 86°17′01″W
- Country: United States
- State: Indiana
- County: Cass
- Township: Washington
- Elevation: 709 ft (216 m)
- ZIP code: 46947
- FIPS code: 18-01738
- GNIS feature ID: 2830326

Anoka is an unincorporated community in Washington Township, Cass County, Indiana.

== History ==
A post office was established at Anoka in 1856, and remained in operation until it was discontinued in 1903. One source speculates the name Anoka might be of Sioux origin.

== Demographics ==
The United States Census Bureau delineated Anoka as a census designated place in the 2022 American Community Survey.
