= New Waverly, Indiana =

New Waverly
- Unincorporated community
- Cass County's location in Indiana

- Location in Cass County
- Coordinates: 40°45′51″N 86°11′33″W
- Country: United States
- State: Indiana
- County: Cass
- Township: Miami
- Elevation: 682 ft (208 m)
- ZIP code: 46947
- FIPS code: 18-53856
- GNIS feature ID: 440124

New Waverly is an unincorporated community in Miami Township, Cass County, Indiana.

== History ==
New Waverly was laid out in 1855. It was likely named after the Waverley Novels by Sir Walter Scott. The New Waverly post office was established in 1857.
