= Eel Township, Cass County, Indiana =

Eel Township
- Township
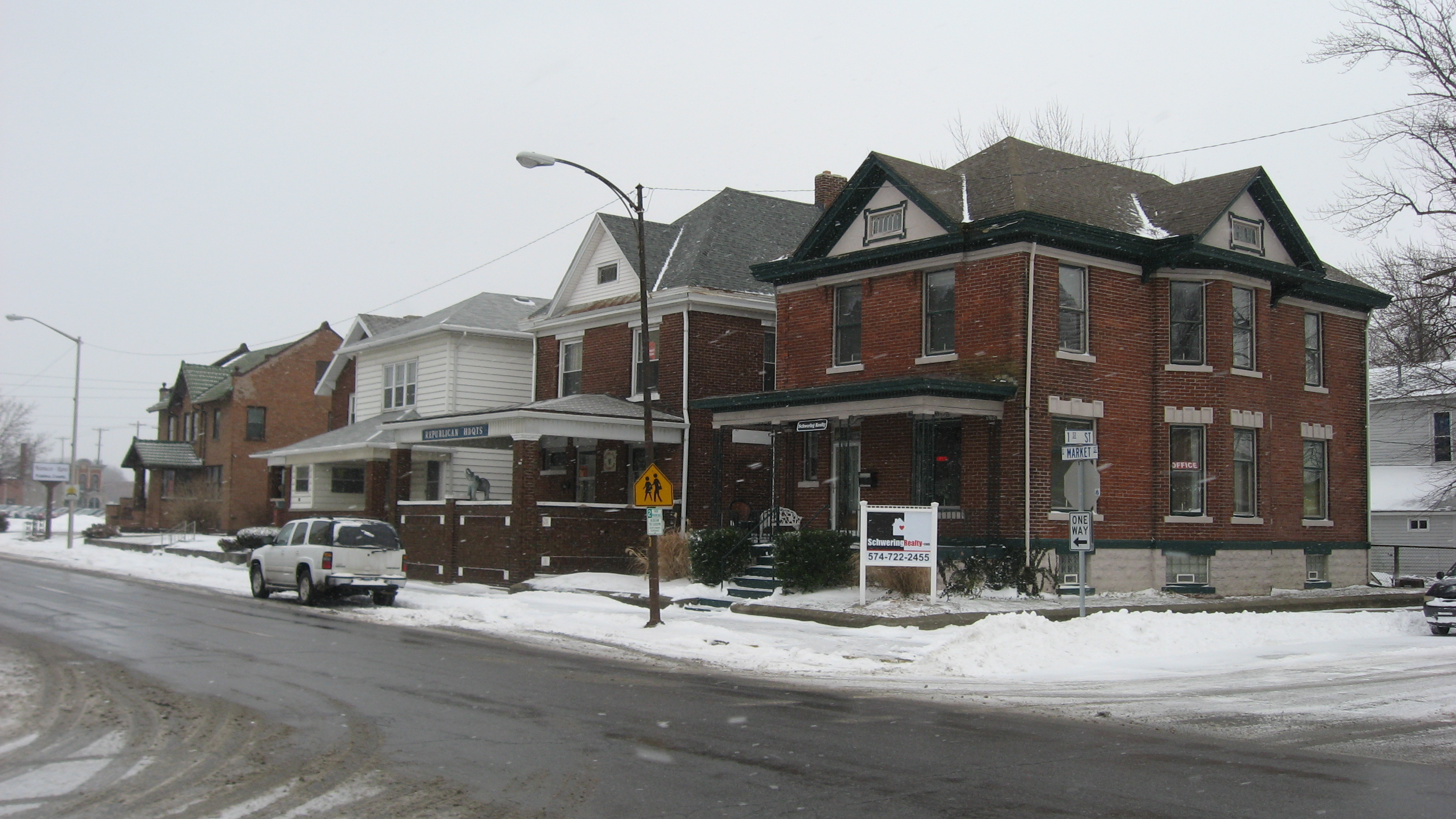
- Houses in the Point Historic District of Logansport, located in the township

- Location of Eel Township in Cass County
- Coordinates: 40°45′14″N 86°21′23″W
- Country: United States
- State: Indiana
- County: Cass

Government
  - Type: Indiana township

Area
  - Total: 9.78 sq mi (25.33 km^{2})
  - Land: 9.3 sq mi (24.2 km^{2})
  - Water: 0.44 sq mi (1.13 km^{2})
- Elevation: 633 ft (193 m)

Population (2020)
  - Total: 18,571
  - Density: 1,990/sq mi (767/km^{2})
- ZIP code: 46947
- Area code: 574
- FIPS code: 18-20494
- GNIS feature ID: 453272

Eel Township is one of fourteen townships in Cass County, Indiana. As of the 2020 census, its population was 18,571 (down from 18,767 at 2010) and contained 8,028 housing units.

== Geography ==
Eel Township covers an area of 9.78 square miles (25.3 km^{2}) and lies partly between the Eel River and the Wabash River; the former joins the latter within Logansport (the county seat). According to the USGS, it contains one cemetery, Mount Hope.
