= National Register of Historic Places listings in White County, Indiana =

Location of White County in Indiana

This is a list of the National Register of Historic Places listings in White County, Indiana.

This is intended to be a complete list of the properties and districts on the National Register of Historic Places in White County, Indiana, United States. Latitude and longitude coordinates are provided for many National Register properties and districts; these locations may be seen together in a map.

There are four properties and districts listed on the National Register in the county, and two former listings.

Properties and districts located in incorporated areas display the name of the municipality, while properties and districts in unincorporated areas display the name of their civil township. Properties and districts split between multiple jurisdictions display the names of all jurisdictions.

This National Park Service list is complete through NPS recent listings posted January 2, 2026.

== Current listings ==
	Name on the Register	Image	Date listed	Location	City or town	Description
1	Monon Commercial Historic District	Monon Commercial Historic District	June 15, 2000 (#00000672)	Roughly Market St. between 3rd and 5th Sts., and 4th St. between Arch and Railroad Sts. 40°51′41″N 86°52′40″W	Monon	
2	Monticello Carnegie Library	Monticello Carnegie Library	June 25, 2013 (#13000428)	101 S. Bluff St. 40°44′41″N 86°45′37″W	Monticello	
3	James Culbertson Reynolds House	James Culbertson Reynolds House	June 17, 1982 (#82000054)	417 N. Main St. 40°44′57″N 86°45′41″W	Monticello	
4	South Grade School Building	South Grade School Building	September 12, 1985 (#85002136)	565 S. Main St. 40°44′17″N 86°45′40″W	Monticello	

== Former listings ==
	Name on the Register	Image	Date listed	Date removed	Location	City or town	Description
1	White County Asylum	White County Asylum	September 23, 2010 (#10000857)	August 28, 2019	5271 Norway Rd., north of Monticello; 40°46′59″N 86°46′11″W	Union Township	
2	Wolcott House	Wolcott House	October 10, 1975 (#75000040)	September 17, 1999	500 N. Range St.	Wolcott	

== See also ==
- List of National Historic Landmarks in Indiana
- National Register of Historic Places listings in Indiana
- Listings in neighboring counties: Benton, Carroll, Cass, Jasper, Pulaski, Tippecanoe
- List of Indiana state historical markers in White County
