= Tippecanoe River =

River in Indiana, USA

Coordinates: 40°30′54″N 86°47′8″W

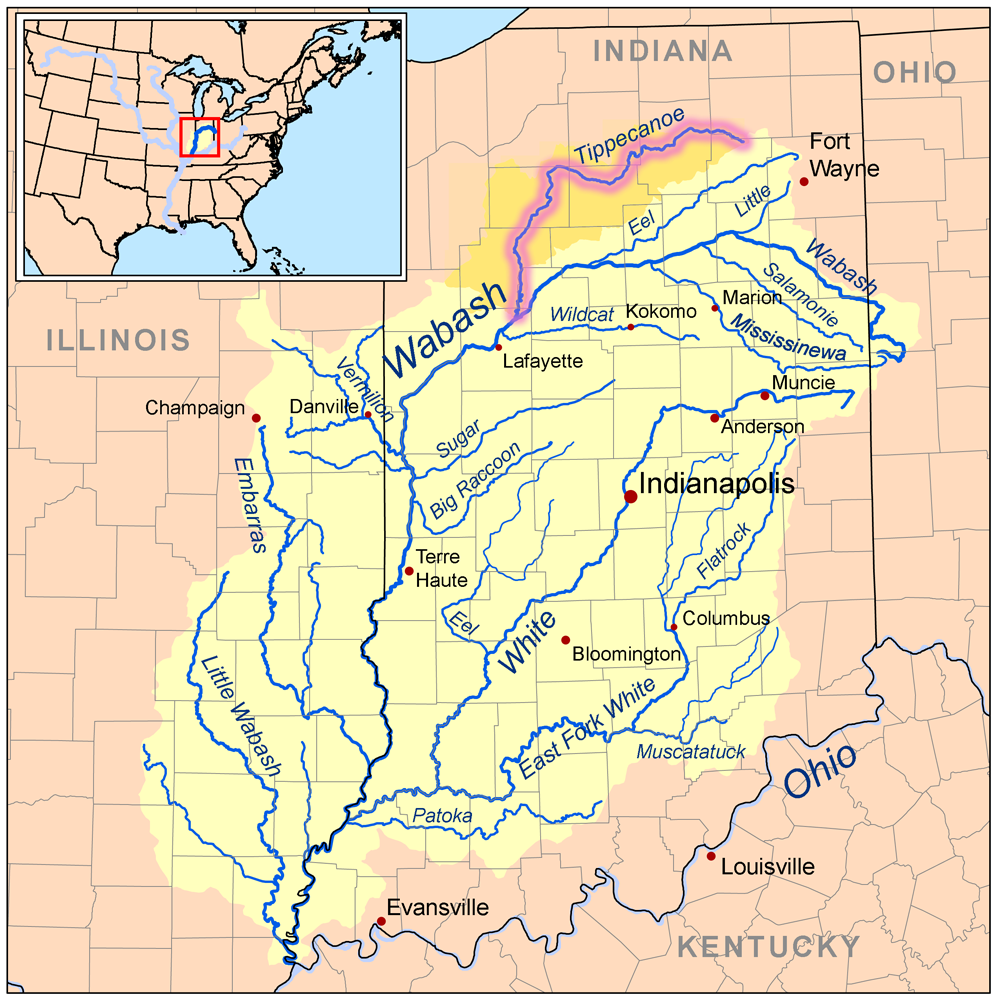
- Map of the Wabash River watershed with the Tippecanoe River highlighted.

Location
- Country: United States

Physical characteristics
- Source
  - location: Crooked Lake in Noble County, Indiana
- Mouth
  - location: Wabash River near Battle Ground, Indiana
- Length: 182 mi (293 km)
- Basin size: 1,875 mi^{2} (4,860 km^{2})
- Discharge
  - average: 5,110 cu ft/s (145 m^{3}/s)

Basin features
- Progression: Wabash → Ohio → Mississippi → Gulf of Mexico

The Tippecanoe River (/ˌtɪpəkəˈnuː/ TIP-ə-kə-NOO) is a gentle, 182-mile-long (293 km) river in the Central Corn Belt Plains ecoregion in northern Indiana. It flows from Crooked Lake in Noble County to the Wabash River near what is now Battle Ground, about 12 miles (19 km) northeast of Lafayette. The name "Tippecanoe" was derived from a Miami–Illinois word for buffalo fish, reconstructed as */kiteepihkwana/ or as kiteepihkwana siipiiwi.

The Tippecanoe River is fed by 88 natural lakes and has a drainage area of 1,250,000 acres (5,100 km^{2}), spanning 14 counties. It supports more numerous imperiled species and overall species diversity than most streams of the upper Midwest. The Nature Conservancy has identified it as one of the top ten rivers in the United States to preserve due to its ecological diversity and the high proportion of endangered species found in it.

== Course ==
The Tippecanoe River originates from multiple kettle lakes formed by ancient glaciers in what is now Noble County, Indiana. Numerous dams were built along its length, to create lakes and ponds for water power. The river flows west into Wilmot Pond, which is formed by a small dam on its western side. After Wilmot, it crosses into Kosciusko County and enters Backwaters Lake, the basin of Webster Lake. After going over the dam at Webster Lake, the river travels a few miles and enters Tippecanoe Lake. From there the river flows south and west through the southeast corner of Marshall County, then bends northwest through the northern part of Fulton County and through Pulaski County, from the northeast corner to the south central portion, traversing Tippecanoe River State Park along the way. It enters White County, where dams form Lake Freeman and Lake Shafer. The river exits Lake Freeman from the south and flows through the west part of Carroll County into Tippecanoe County, where it joins the Wabash River.

In addition to Tippecanoe County, five townships through which the river flows are named Tippecanoe:

- Tippecanoe Township, Carroll County, Indiana
- Tippecanoe Township, Kosciusko County, Indiana
- Tippecanoe Township, Marshall County, Indiana
- Tippecanoe Township, Pulaski County, Indiana
- Tippecanoe Township, Tippecanoe County, Indiana

== History ==
The Battle of Tippecanoe, in which Governor William Henry Harrison defeated the Indian confederacy of Tecumseh, occurred near the south bank of the river. Modern Lafayette developed near this site.

== Aquatic Life ==
The Upper Tippecanoe River continues to have habitat suitable for unionid (freshwater mussel) species. The rivershed has retained much of its natural condition, continuing to provide a high quality habitat for freshwater mussels. Surveys done since 1903 show that the waterway continues to support 57 species of mussels. Modern changes in the surrounding land use and dredging the river channel affect the silt levels and stream flow, which threaten the mussel populations. Of the existing species, several are state listed as endangered, including the northern riffleshell (Epioblasma Torulosa rangiana), the wavyrayed lampmussel (Lampsilis fasciola), the kidneyshell (Ptychobranchus fasciolaris), and the purple lilliput (Toxolasma lividus). The clubshell (Pleurobema clava) is a federally endangered species.

The river fishery is similar to the early 1900s, even with the changes in river use and the increase in urban and agricultural use. Surveys done in the early 21st century found representatives of 14 families and 54 species of fishes. Nearly 80% of collected fish are game fish species, including: Largemouth bass (Micropterus salmoides), Yellow perch (Perca flavescens), Walleye (Stizostedion vitreum), Muskellunge (Esox masquinongy), Bluegill (Lepomis macrochirus), Channel catfish (Ictalurus punctatus), Rainbow trout (Oncorhynchus mykiss), White and Black crappie (Pomoxis annularis and P. nigromaculatus), Longear sunfish (Lepomis megalotis), Northern pike (Esox lucius), Rock bass (Ambloplites rupestris), White bass (Morone chrysops) and Warmouth (Lepomis gulosus). Bluegill were the dominant fish, being 50% of the river population.

== Dams ==
In the 1920s, two dams were built along the Tippecanoe River to produce electricity.

- Oakdale Hydro Plant, built in 1925, created Lake Freeman. Lake Freeman reached 7 miles (11 km) north through Monticello. It provides 9.2 MW of power through NiSource. Lake Freeman is held at 610 feet (190 m) above sealevel.
- Norway Hydro Plant, built in 1925, created Lake Shafer. Lake Shafer reached 6 miles (9.7 km) north from Norway. It provides 7.2 MW of power through NiSource. Lake Shafer is held at 645 feet (197 m) above sealevel.

== See also ==
- List of Indiana rivers
