= Joan Browning =

American civil rights activist

Joan Constance Browning is a Freedom Rider and civil rights activist known for her participation in non-violent protests in the southern United States in the 1960s.

== Biography ==
Browning was born and raised in rural Georgia, and started college in 1959 at Georgia State College for Women at the age of sixteen. While there she began to be involved in the freedom rider movement, and her involvement in the movement ultimately led to her 1961 dismissal from the college because of her decision to attend a black church. At the age of eighteen, she decided to move to Atlanta, where she worked in the library of Emory University and was attending classes at night.

At the age of 19 she became one of the Freedom Riders who traveled the south in 1961, where she joined the racially mixed group of people traveling south. She was arrested in Albany, Georgia and was the only white women to be put in jail where she spent a total of five days. After she was released from jail, she spoke to the group about her feelings and noted "It's a funny, mixed-up feeling to hate being in a dirty place — but to be glad that you're there for a good reason".

Browning's role in the civil rights movement was also detailed in the book The Road South, B. J. Hollars' book about the Freedom Riders.

Browning would go on to graduate from West Virginia State College, now known as West Virginia State University in 1994. She shares her experiences in the civil rights movement in public events as a means to engage young people, and she writes on the historical details of the civil rights movement using biographies such as her article on the activist Fannie Lou Hamer.

== Selected publications ==
- Browning, Joan C. (January 2022). "For Freedom's Sake: The Life of Fannie Lou Hamer". Alabama Review. 55 (1): 56–58.
- Curry, Constance (2000). Deep in our hearts : nine white women in the Freedom Movement. Athens. ISBN 0-8203-2266-0. OCLC 45253105.
- Browning, Joan C. (1996). "Invisible Revolutionaries: White Women in Civil Rights Historiography". Journal of Women's History. 8 (3): 186–204. doi:10.1353/jowh.2010.0462. ISSN 1527-2036. S2CID 144476747.

== Awards and honors ==
In 2000, Browning received the West Virginia Martin Luther King Jr. "Living the Dream Award". In 2005, Browning received the Martin Luther King Achievement Award from West Virginia University. On April 27, 2024, Browning received an honorary Doctor of Letters from Marshall University. On June 8, 2025, Marshall University dedicated an honorary bench on their campus with a plaque reading "West Virginia's Freedom Rider.
