= List of Indiana state historical markers in White County =

Location of White County in Indiana

This is a list of the Indiana state historical markers in White County.

This is intended to be a complete list of the official state historical markers placed in White County, Indiana, United States by the Indiana Historical Bureau. The locations of the historical markers and their latitude and longitude coordinates are included below when available, along with their names, years of placement, and topics as recorded by the Historical Bureau. There are 4 historical markers located in White County.

== Historical markers ==
Marker title	Image	Year placed	Location	Topics
The Wolcott House		1961	500 N. Range Street/U.S. Route 24/U.S. Route 231 on the northern edge of Wolcott; 40°45′44″N 87°2′30″W	Buildings and Architecture, Business, Industry, and Labor
Indiana Normal [School], 1852-1886		1976	Junction of S. Main and Pearl Streets in front of the community center in Burnettsville; 40°45′42″N 86°35′36″W	Education
Monon, Indiana		1982	Junction of U.S. Route 421/Market Street and E. Third Street in Monon; 40°51′41″N 86°52′42″W	Transportation
Trooper Paul Vincent Minneman		1992	Northwestern corner of the junction of State Road 16 and County Road 1450E adjacent to the United Methodist Church, 0.5 miles west of the Cass/White county line 40°52′7″N 86°35′27″W	Government Institutions

== See also ==
- List of Indiana state historical markers
- National Register of Historic Places listings in White County, Indiana
