= East Monticello, Indiana =

- Unincorporated community
- Location within Indiana Location within the United States
- Coordinates: 40°44′46″N 86°45′12″W
- Country: United States
- State: Indiana
- County: White
- Township: Union
- Elevation: 640 ft (195 m)
- Time zone: UTC-5 (Eastern (EST))
  - Summer (DST): UTC-4 (EDT)
- ZIP code: 47960
- FIPS code: 18-19900
- GNIS feature ID: 433921

East Monticello is an unincorporated community in Union Township, White County, in the U.S. state of Indiana.

== History ==
East Monticello is named for a subdivision that lays east of Monticello's Washington Street Bridge and outside the incorporated city limit defined by the Tippecanoe River. Over the years, all of the developed area in and around that subdivision has inherited the title of East Monticello, probably because of the geographical relationship to Monticello. The area is mostly residential and bounded by the Tippecanoe River to the south and west, a railroad to the north, and a cemetery to the east.

== Geography ==
East Monticello is located at 40°44′46″N 86°45′12″W.
