= Wolcott, Indiana =

- Town
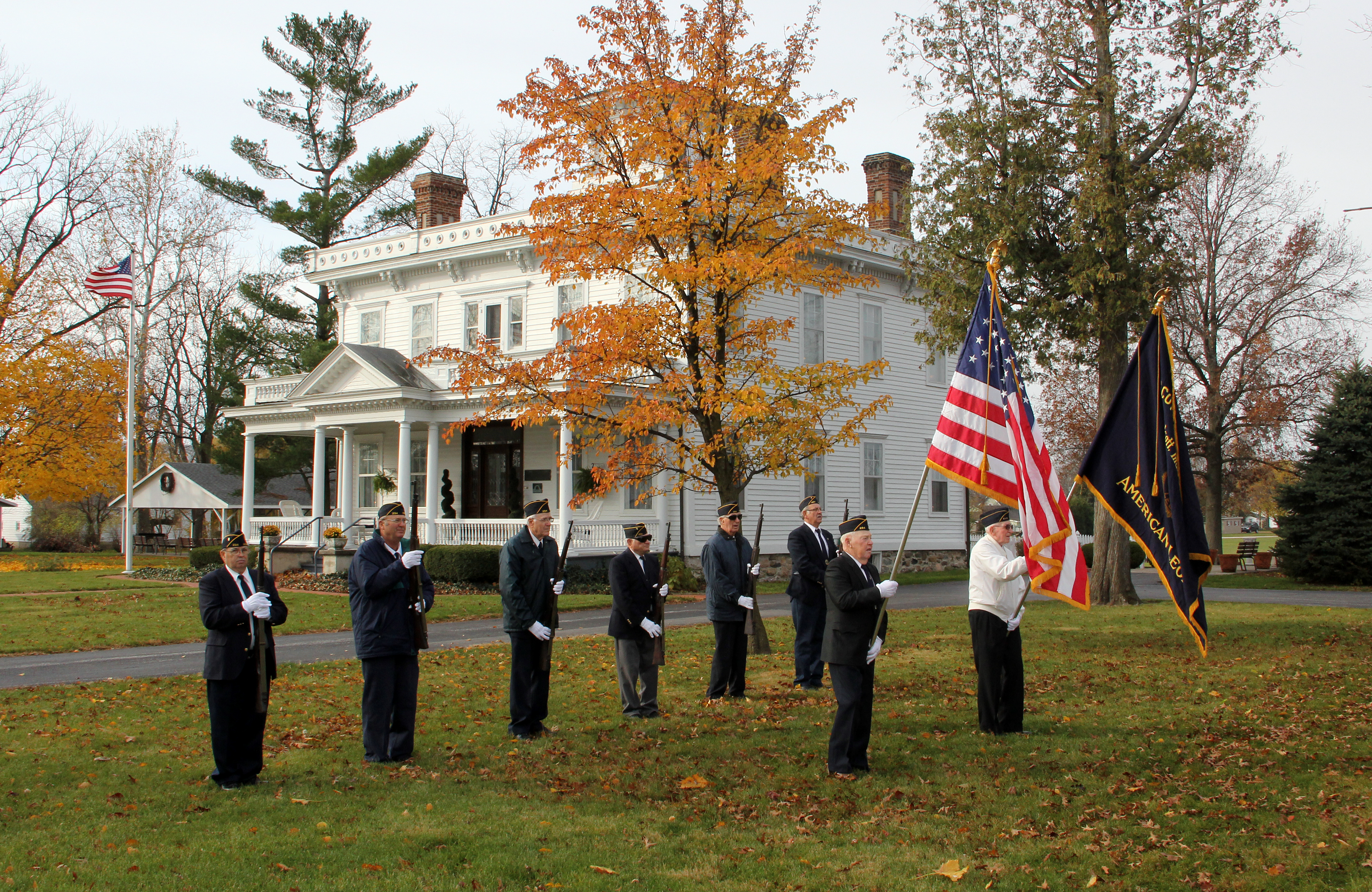
- Members of American Legion Post #294 in front of the Wolcott House, the Italianate home of town founder Anson Wolcott.

- Logo

- Location of Wolcott in White County, Indiana.
- Coordinates: 40°45′32″N 87°2′32″W
- Country: United States
- State: Indiana
- County: White
- Township: Princeton
- Founded: May 1861
- Incorporated: May 3, 1873
- Dissolved: 1875
- Reincorporated: 1889
- Founder: Anson Wolcott

Area
  - Total: 0.59 sq mi (1.54 km^{2})
  - Land: 0.59 sq mi (1.54 km^{2})
  - Water: 0 sq mi (0.00 km^{2})
- Elevation: 715 ft (218 m)

Population (2020)
  - Total: 950
  - Density: 1,603/sq mi (618.8/km^{2})
- Time zone: UTC-5 (Eastern (EST))
  - Summer (DST): UTC-4 (EDT)
- ZIP code: 47995
- Area code: 219
- FIPS code: 18-85058
- GNIS feature ID: 446230
- Website: www.wolcottindiana.org

Wolcott (/ˈwʊlkət/ WUUL-kət) is a town in Princeton Township, White County, in the U.S. state of Indiana. The population was 950 at the 2020 census.

== History ==
Wolcott was platted in May 1861 when the railroad was extended to that point and is named after its founder, Anson Wolcott. Oliver Wolcott, an ancestor of Anson, was a signer of the Declaration of Independence. A post office, which with a zip code of 47995, the highest zip code within Indiana, has been in operation at Wolcott since 1861. Wolcott was first incorporated on May 3, 1873, however the town was dissolved two years later in 1875 due to lack of government funding. Wolcott was reincorporated in 1889.

The Wolcott House was formerly listed on the National Register of Historic Places. The Wolcott July 4 Summer Festival has been celebrated every year since 1967 on the grounds of the Wolcott House, except for 2020 due to the Coronavirus outbreak. It is now (as of 2022) celebrated on the weekend prior to the 4th of July.

Major businesses in Wolcott (as of 2020) include Indiana Ribbon (one of the few decorative ribbon manufacturing plants left in the U.S.), Dwyer Instruments, the Bank of Wolcott (with branches in Remington and Monticello), Cives Steel Company, and the Farmers Elevator.

Wolcott aims to become the quietest town in America after passing a new town ordinance in 2022. Town members can be fined for producing any audible sound that can be heard from a neighbor's property line. This could include a dog bark, normal conversations, generators, radios, wind chimes, etc. However, lawn and power tools are permitted.

== Geography ==
According to the 2010 census, Wolcott has a total area of 0.59 square miles (1.53 km^{2}), all land.

== Demographics ==
Historical population
Census	Pop.	Note	%±
1860	146		—
1870	109		−25.3%
1880	239		119.3%
1890	246		2.9%
1900	825		235.4%
1910	873		5.8%
1920	868		−0.6%
1930	747		−13.9%
1940	736		−1.5%
1950	778		5.7%
1960	877		12.7%
1970	894		1.9%
1980	923		3.2%
1990	886		−4.0%
2000	989		11.6%
2010	1,001		1.2%
2020	950		−5.1%
U.S. Decennial Census

=== 2010 census ===
As of the census of 2010, there were 1,001 people, 385 households, and 272 families living in the town. The population density was 1,696.6 inhabitants per square mile (655.1/km^{2}). There were 428 housing units at an average density of 725.4 per square mile (280.1/km^{2}). The racial makeup of the town was 95.3% White, 0.3% African American, 0.1% Native American, 0.3% Asian, 1.1% from other races, and 2.9% from two or more races. Hispanic or Latino of any race were 2.6% of the population.

There were 385 households, of which 31.9% had children under the age of 18 living with them, 53.8% were married couples living together, 10.4% had a female householder with no husband present, 6.5% had a male householder with no wife present, and 29.4% were non-families. 26.0% of all households were made up of individuals, and 13.7% had someone living alone who was 65 years of age or older. The average household size was 2.60 and the average family size was 3.10.

The median age in the town was 39.4 years. 26.2% of residents were under the age of 18; 7.7% were between the ages of 18 and 24; 21.6% were from 25 to 44; 27.2% were from 45 to 64; and 17.4% were 65 years of age or older. The gender makeup of the town was 49.7% male and 50.3% female.

=== 2000 census ===
As of the census of 2000, there were 989 people, 392 households, and 272 families living in the town. The population density was 1,846.8 inhabitants per square mile (713.1/km^{2}). There were 427 housing units at an average density of 797.3 per square mile (307.8/km^{2}). The racial makeup of the town was 98.28% White, 0.30% African American, 0.20% Native American, and 1.21% from two or more races. Hispanic or Latino of any race were 1.01% of the population.

There were 392 households, out of which 31.6% had children under the age of 18 living with them, 56.6% were married couples living together, 9.7% had a female householder with no husband present, and 30.4% were non-families. 27.0% of all households were made up of individuals, and 17.6% had someone living alone who was 65 years of age or older. The average household size was 2.52 and the average family size was 3.06.

In the town, the population was spread out, with 25.9% under the age of 18, 8.1% from 18 to 24, 27.9% from 25 to 44, 19.7% from 45 to 64, and 18.4% who were 65 years of age or older. The median age was 38 years. For every 100 females, there were 83.1 males. For every 100 females age 18 and over, there were 81.0 males.

The median income for a household in the town was $37,563, and the median income for a family was $45,833. Males had a median income of $29,293 versus $18,990 for females. The per capita income for the town was $14,875. About 4.7% of families and 8.4% of the population were below the poverty line, including 13.4% of those under age 18 and 7.5% of those age 65 or over.

== Education ==
Wolcott is served by the Tri-County School Corporation. Tri-County serves five townships in three counties: Princeton, West Point and Round Grove townships in White County; Carpenter township in Jasper County; and Gilboa township in Benton County. Tri-County Middle/Senior High School is located approximately three miles southwest of Wolcott in White County; Tri-County Elementary School is located in Remington, IN while Tri-County Intermediate School is located in Wolcott. Prior to the consolidation with the Remington, IN schools to form the Tri-County School Corporation in the late 1960s, Wolcott was served by Wolcott Schools (Wolcott Elementary School, Wolcott Junior High School, and Wolcott High School). The first graduating class from Tri-County High School was in May 1972.

The town has a lending library, the Wolcott Community Public Library.

== See also ==
- Bobbie the Wonder Dog, Wolcott was the starting point for his journey to Oregon.
