= Union Township, White County, Indiana =

Union Township
- Township
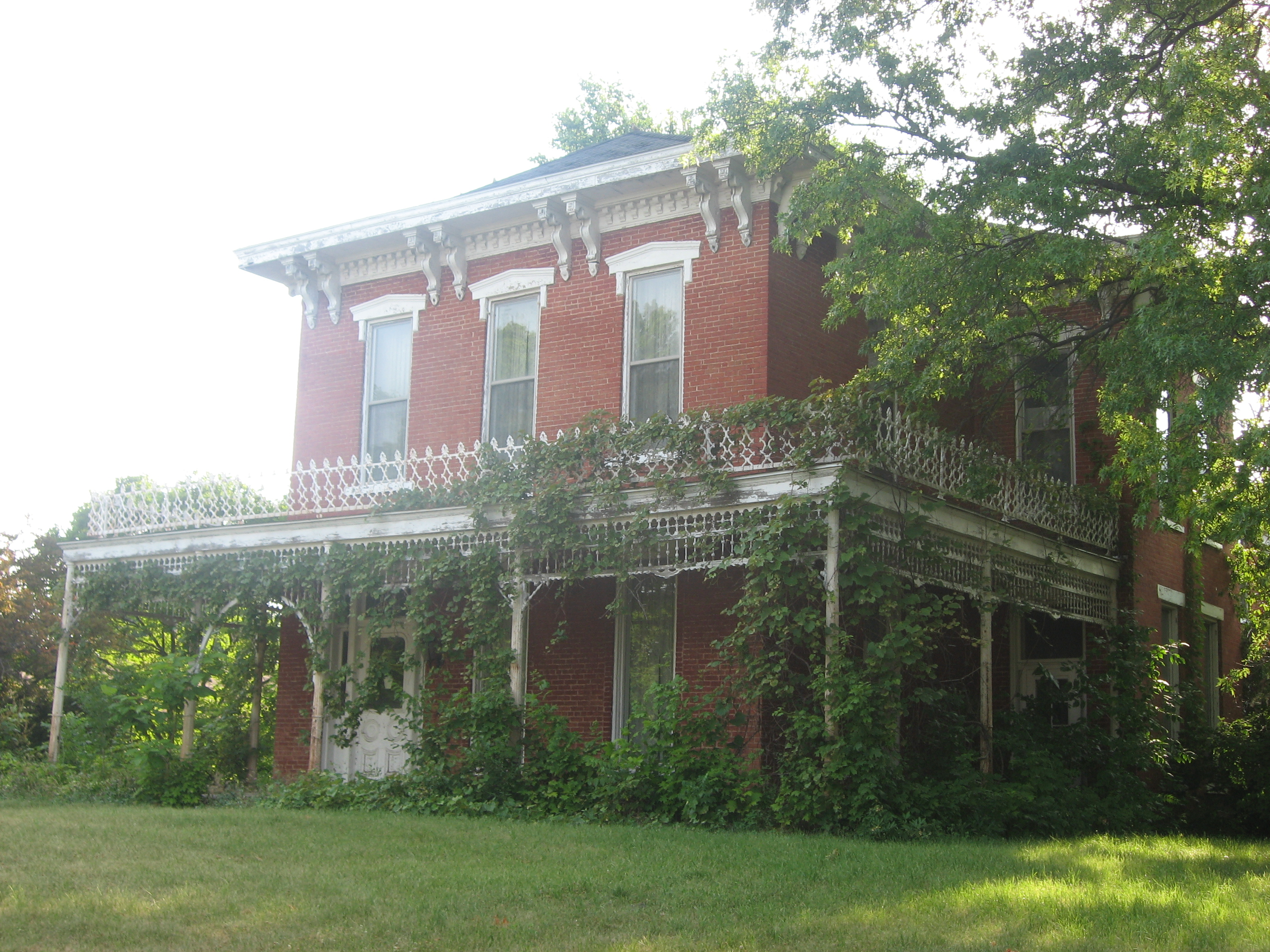
- The James Culbertson Reynolds House in Monticello

- Location in White County
- Coordinates: 40°44′55″N 86°46′14″W
- Country: United States
- State: Indiana
- County: White

Government
  - Type: Indiana township

Area
  - Total: 43.81 sq mi (113.5 km^{2})
  - Land: 41.67 sq mi (107.9 km^{2})
  - Water: 2.14 sq mi (5.5 km^{2}) 4.88%
- Elevation: 679 ft (207 m)

Population (2020)
  - Total: 9,860
  - Density: 237/sq mi (91.4/km^{2})
- ZIP codes: 47929, 47960
- GNIS feature ID: 453939

Union Township is one of twelve townships in White County, Indiana, United States. As of the 2020 census, its population was 9,860 and it contained 5,082 housing units.

Union Township was organized in 1834.

Historical population
Census	Pop.	Note	%±
1890	2,632		—
1900	3,307		25.6%
1910	3,336		0.9%
1920	3,604		8.0%
1930	3,440		−4.6%
1940	4,523		31.5%
1950	5,510		21.8%
1960	6,740		22.3%
1970	7,741		14.9%
1980	9,357		20.9%
1990	9,265		−1.0%
2000	10,436		12.6%
2010	9,906		−5.1%
2020	9,860		−0.5%
Source: US Decennial Census

== Geography ==
According to the 2010 census, the township has a total area of 43.81 square miles (113.5 km^{2}), of which 41.67 square miles (107.9 km^{2}) (or 95.12%) is land and 2.14 square miles (5.5 km^{2}) (or 4.88%) is water.

=== Cities, towns, villages ===
- Monticello
- Norway

=== Unincorporated towns ===
- Cedar Point at 40.708928°N 86.760289°W
- East Monticello at 40.746150°N 86.753345°W
- Golden Hill at 40.710316°N 86.760567°W
- Guernsey at 40.800317°N 86.812791°W
- Indiana Beach at 40.791428°N 86.768068°W

(This list is based on USGS data and may include former settlements.)

=== Adjacent townships ===
- Liberty Township (north)
- Lincoln Township (east)
- Jefferson Township, Carroll County (southeast)
- Big Creek Township (southwest)
- Honey Creek Township (west)
- Monon Township (northwest)

=== Cemeteries ===
The township contains these two cemeteries: Cutler and River View.

=== Airports and landing strips ===
- Dittman Airport
- White County Airport

=== Rivers ===
- Tippecanoe River

=== Landmarks ===
- Monticello City Park
- The White County Asylum was listed on the National Register of Historic Places in 2010.

== Education ==
- Twin Lakes School Corporation

Union Township is served by the Monticello-Union Township Public Library.

== Political districts ==
- Indiana's 4th congressional district
- State House District 15
- State House District 16
- State Senate District 07
