= Lake Shafer =

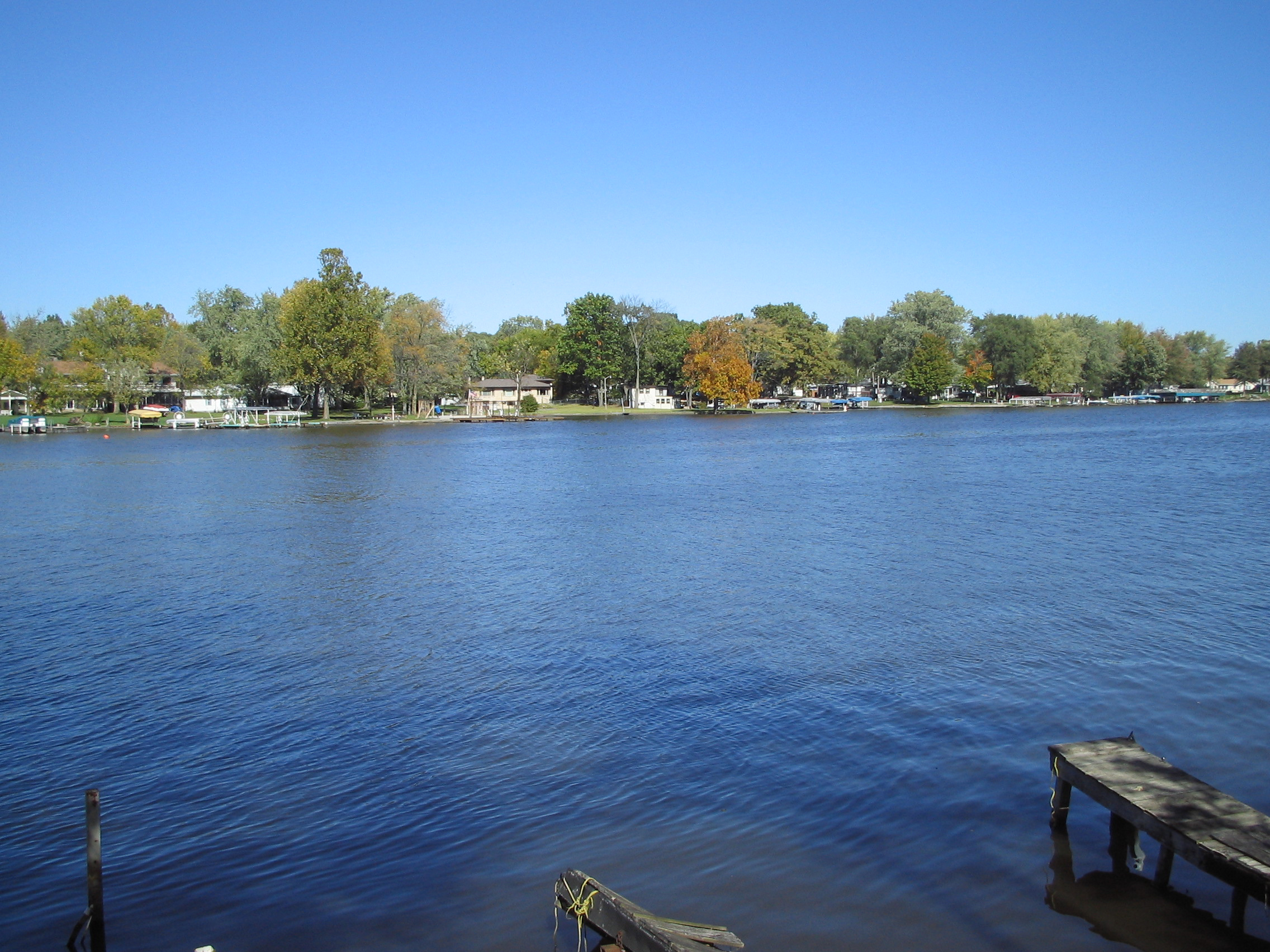

- Location within Indiana Location within the United States
- Location: White County, Indiana, United States
- Coordinates: 40°49′47″N 86°47′54″W
- Type: reservoir
- Primary inflows: Tippecanoe River
- Basin countries: United States
- Max. length: 16.1 km (10.0 mi)
- Surface area: 5.22 km^{2} (2.02 sq mi)
- Average depth: 3.05 m (10.0 ft)
- Max. depth: 9.14 m (30.0 ft)
- Water volume: 16×10^{6} m^{3} (13,000 acre⋅ft)
- Surface elevation: 191 metres (627 ft)
- Settlements: Monticello, Indiana

Lake Shafer is one of two reservoirs located in the Twin Lakes area of Monticello, Indiana. It was created along with Lake Freeman in the 1920s when two dams were built outside of Monticello on the Tippecanoe River. It remains a popular recreational area and helps generate an estimated $70 million in tourism revenue for White County.

== History ==
Creation of Lake Shafer began in 1922 with the construction of the Norway Dam at river mile 30.2 above the confluence of the Wabash River. Construction of the dam finished in June, 1923, and it remains standing approximately one mile north of Monticello.

Lake Shafer remains the more commercial of the Twin Lakes, largely due to the presence of the Indiana Beach Amusement Park and Camp Resort. There are also a vast number of rental cottages and homes as well as boat rental marinas. Many of Lake Shafer's residents are part-timers, spending the majority of their time at the lake on weekends, traditionally April through October. The lake is often busy with boat traffic on summer weekends due to the increase in tourists.

== Ecology ==
Because it is located in the Tippecanoe River drainage basin, it is a natural sediment trap. These feeding sediments have caused some parts of the northern part of the lake to be shallowed to as low as 4 feet. Since 2004, there have been active efforts to dredge many parts of the shallow areas on the lake to remove debris from the bottom of the lake, remove sandbars, and increase the lake's depth.

Since its formation, Lake Shafer has been drained in 1965, 1975, 1985, and 1995, so repair work could be made to the Norway Dam..

It was announced that in late April 2008, Lake Shafer will be drained once again for repairs to the Norway Dam. It will be drained 3 feet the weekend of April 26–27, and six feet by May 3–4. Only the main riverbed will remain during the draining of it.
