= W. E. Biederwolf =

American minister

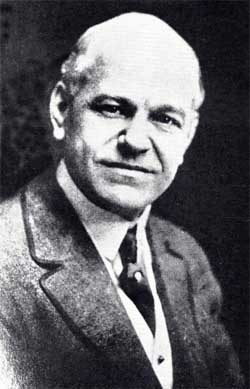
- Biederwolf circa 1920
- Born: September 9, 1867
- Died: September 3, 1939 (aged 71); Monticello, Indiana, United States
- Resting place: Old Monticello Cemetery, Monticello, Indiana
- Education: Princeton College
- Occupation: Evangelist
- Spouse: Ida Casad
- Parent(s): Michael Biederwolf, Abolana Schnetzer Biederwolf

William Edward Biederwolf (September 29, 1867 – September 3, 1939) was an American Presbyterian evangelist.

== Biography ==
=== Youth and education ===
W. E. Biederwolf was born in Monticello, Indiana, the son of German immigrants. At the age of eighteen, while teaching at a public school in White County, Biederwolf made a profession of faith in Jesus Christ and joined the local Presbyterian church.

After attending Wabash College in Crawfordsville, Indiana, for a year, Biederwolf moved on to Princeton College where he earned a B.A. in 1892 and an M.A. in 1894. He graduated from Princeton Theological Seminary in 1895. Much to his father's displeasure, Biederwolf also played football during his years at Princeton. During the summers Biederwolf worked at rescue missions in the Bowery and in Scranton, Pennsylvania, and after graduation from seminary, he worked for a year with evangelist B. Fay Mills. After marrying his childhood friend Ida Casad in 1896, Biederwolf spent eighteen months studying at the University of Berlin and the University of Erlangen in Germany and at the Sorbonne in Paris. While in Berlin he also preached at the American Church.

=== Evangelism ===
Biederwolf returned to the United States in 1897 and was called as pastor of the Broadway Presbyterian Church in Logansport, Indiana, serving a year before the Spanish–American War and three years afterward. During the war, he was commissioned as a chaplain with the 161st Indiana Volunteers, which served in Cuba for six months. (Biederwolf himself wrote an exhaustive regimental history.) His military experience suggested how social service might be melded with evangelism.

In 1900, Biederwolf left the pastorate for professional evangelism, first apprenticing under Presbyterian evangelist J. Wilbur Chapman, then striking out on his own by 1906. Although he never achieved the extraordinary popularity of Billy Sunday, Biederwolf was in the first rank of contemporary evangelists along with such men as Chapman, Gypsy Smith, and R. A. Torrey. By the 1910s he was holding evangelistic campaigns in small cities such as Fall River, Massachusetts; Watertown, New York; and Allentown, Pennsylvania. Like Sunday, Biederwolf emphasized prohibition and tended to meld patriotism with religion, calling the "flag of the saloon" the "dirty red flag" of socialism. Yet Biederwolf, a staunch theological conservative, also promoted civic reform and played a prominent role in the Men and Religion Forward Movement of 1911–12, which tenuously mingled soul winning with the Social Gospel.

In his early years, at least, Biederwolf was not above using parades, athletic feats, and magic tricks to win over audiences. Also like his colleagues, Biederwolf gave sermons on "booze," motherhood, and purity (though, as was typical of the period, the latter was given to men only). Later Biederwolf winced at evangelists who had promotional photographs taken of themselves in ridiculous poses, admitting that although he himself had "been foolishly guilty with his brethren," he had "put away the things of a fool." While Biederwolf stressed the significance of the Holy Spirit in producing conversions, he also did not shy away from noting the importance of the evangelist's "personal magnetism."

Eager to improve evangelistic method and the reputation of evangelists, Biederwolf served as a president of the Interdenominational Association of Evangelists, which he helped to found in 1904. From 1914 to 1917 Biederwolf also served as executive director of the Federal Council of Churches' commission on evangelism. In 1923–1924 Biederwolf conducted campaigns in Australia and Asia; and in Korea, moved by the suffering of lepers, he established and supported a leper colony in Reisui and became the director of the American Mission to Lepers.

=== Other interests ===
In 1909 he established the Family Altar League to promote family devotions, and for many years he served as its president. He also served as the director of the Winona Lake Bible Conference. From 1923 until 1933 he was director of the Winona Lake School of Theology, and in 1933 he became its president. During the last ten years of his life he was the seasonal pastor of the Royal Poinciana Chapel in Palm Beach, Florida, a nondenominational congregation of 1,500 members, many of whom were very wealthy.

Biederwolf wrote more than thirty books including The Millennium Bible, a commentary on the eschatological passages of the Scripture (still in print at the end of the 20th century), as well as treatises on evangelism, volumes of sermons, and even Illustrations from Mythology (1927) and Illustrations from Art (1927).

=== Personality and importance ===
Ever a student, Biederwolf was a firm believer in serious reading and regularly carried a book under his arm to make use of otherwise wasted moments. His sermons were written out word-for-word and memorized, but his delivery was so fluent that listeners were unaware of his preparation. Biederwolf enjoyed athletics (in later life, tennis and golf), and he was a collector of small gemstones, which he prized for their color and light rather than for their intrinsic value. Biederwolf died at his home in Monticello in 1939.

The fundamentalist Bob Jones Jr., who as a boy knew and admired Biederwolf, thought him a man whose "scholarship was broad" and whose use of the English language was "concise, accurate, and powerful." A recent biographer considered Biederwolf an "excellent administrator, an inspiring preacher, a popular author, and a highly successful evangelist, [who] did much to help shape the methods and message of revivalism during the first thirty years of the twentieth century."
