= Lake Freeman =

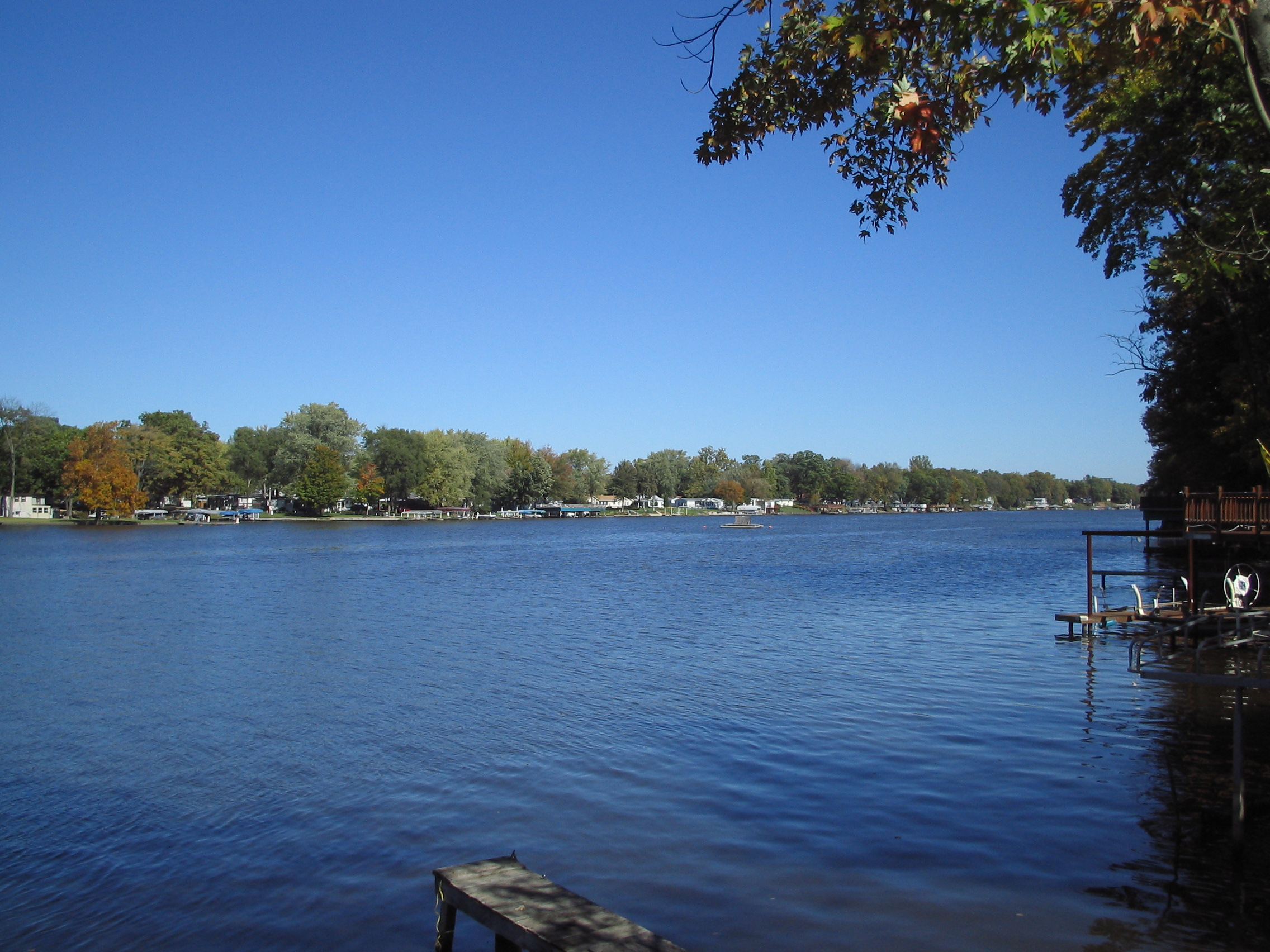

- Location within Indiana Location within the United States
- Location: White County, Indiana, United States
- Coordinates: 40°41′34″N 86°45′32″W
- Type: reservoir
- Primary inflows: Tippecanoe River
- Primary outflows: Tippecanoe River
- Basin countries: United States
- Max. length: 12 mi (19 km)
- Surface area: 1,500 acres (610 ha)
- Average depth: 16 ft (4.9 m)
- Max. depth: 45 ft (14 m)
- Surface elevation: 610 ft (190 m)

Lake Freeman is a reservoir outside of Monticello, Indiana, in the United States, formed in 1925 by the completion of the Oakdale Dam. Lake Freeman, together with its sister lake, Lake Shafer is part of the Twin Lakes region, a popular summer recreational area centered on the town of Monticello, Indiana.

Construction of the Oakdale Dam began in 1923 and was completed in 1925, damming the waters of the Tippecanoe River. The earthen dam is 58 feet (18 m) high, has a maximum capacity of 40,540 acre-feet (50,010,000 m^{3}), normal capacity of 26,140 acre-feet (32,240,000 m^{3}), and is owned by the Northern Indiana Public Service Company.

Compared to the more commercial lake, Lake Shafer, Lake Freeman remains more privatized and residential. Lake Freeman, is however, home of the Madam Carroll, a pleasure excursion vessel, 36 feet (11 m) in width and 135 feet (41 m) in length.

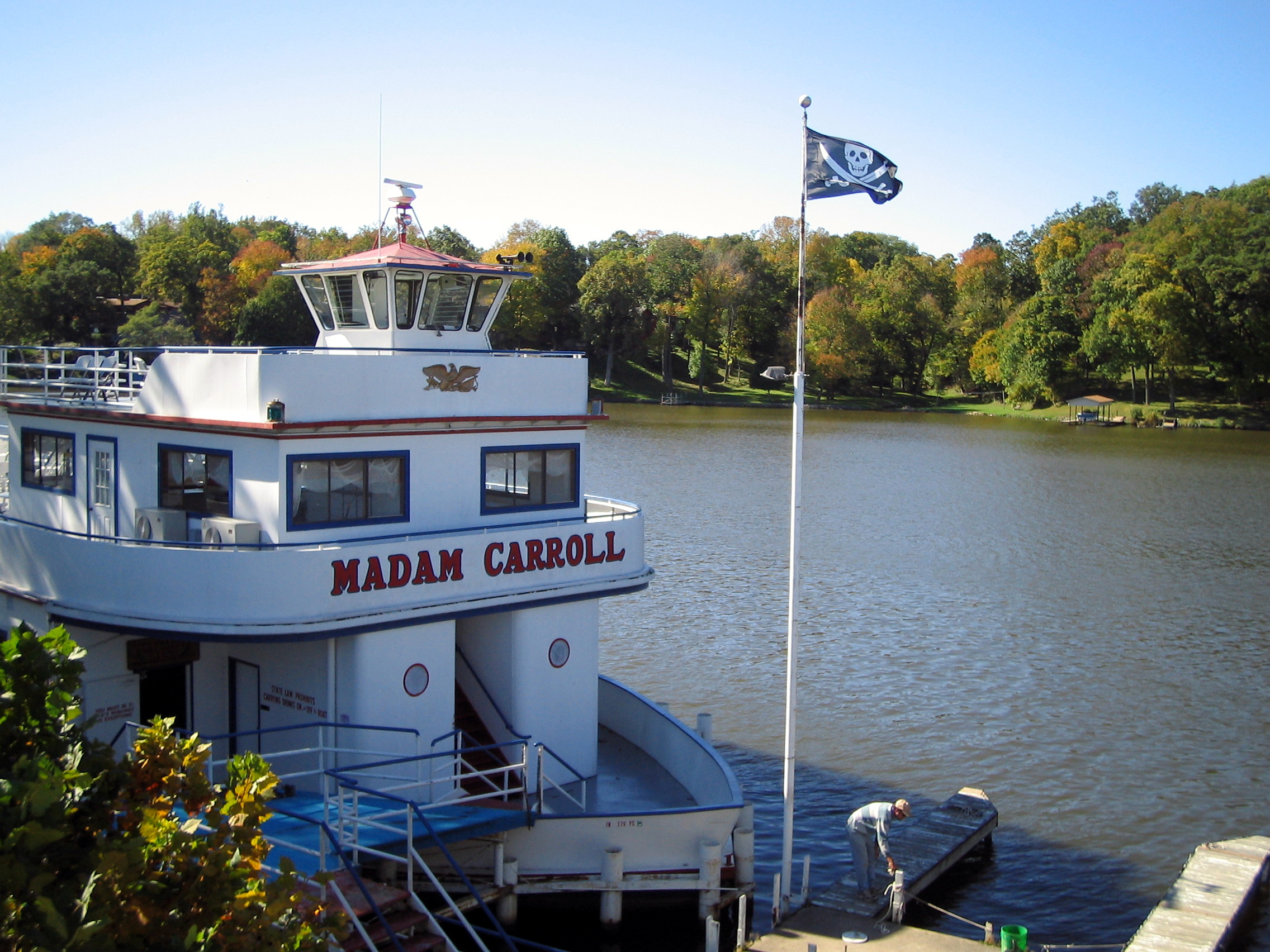
The Madam Carroll on Lake Freeman

Lake Freeman is roughly 1,500 acres (6 km^{2}) in area and has a shoreline of 50 miles (80 km). Depths vary from 7 feet (2 m) to 45 feet (14 m) at the Oakdale Dam. According to his widow, it was named for Rhode Island civil engineer Roger Morse Freeman who was involved in many well known projects; his father John R. Freeman, who he started his career with, was an internationally known engineer.

Freeman Lacus on Titan is named after Lake Freeman.
