= Golden Hill, Indiana =

- Unincorporated community
- Location within Indiana Location within the United States
- Coordinates: 40°42′35″N 86°45′49″W
- Country: United States
- State: Indiana
- County: White
- Township: Union
- Elevation: 620 ft (190 m)
- Time zone: UTC-5 (Eastern (EST))
  - Summer (DST): UTC-4 (EDT)
- ZIP code: 47960
- GNIS feature ID: 435156

Golden Hill is an unincorporated community in Union Township, White County, in the U.S. state of Indiana.

== Geography ==
Golden Hill is located at 40°42′35″N 86°45′49″W.
