= List of ecoregions in Indiana =

The list of ecoregions in Indiana are listings of terrestrial ecoregions (see also, ecosystem) in the United States' State of Indiana, as defined separately by the United States Environmental Protection Agency (USEPA), and the World Wildlife Fund.

== USEPA ==
The USEPA ecoregion classification system has four levels, but only Levels I, III, and IV are shown on this list. Level I divides North America into 15 broad ecoregions (or biomes). Indiana is within the Eastern Temperate Forest environment, Level I region. Level IV ecoregions (denoted by numbers and letters) are a further subdivision of Level III ecoregions (denoted by numbers alone).

- 54 Central Corn Belt Plains
  - 54a - Illinois/Indiana Prairie
  - 54b - Chicago Lake Plain
  - 54c - Kankakee Marsh
  - 54d - Sand Area
- 55 Eastern Corn Belt Plains
  - 55a - The Clayey, High Lime Till Plains
  - 55b - The Loamy, High Lime Till Plains
  - 55d - The Pre-Wisconsinan Drift Plains
  - 55f - The Whitewater Interlobate Area
- 56 Southern Michigan/Northern Indiana Drift Plains
  - 56a - The Lake Country
  - 56b - The Elkhart Till Plains
  - 56c - The Middle Tippecanoe Plains
  - 56d - The Michigan Lake Plain
- 57 Huron/Erie Lake Plains
  - 57a - The Maumee Lake Plains
- 71 Interior Plateau
  - 71a - The Crawford Uplands
  - 71b - The Mitchell Plain
  - 71c - The Norman Upland
  - 71d - The Northern Bluegrass
- 72 Interior River Valleys and Hills
  - 72a - Wabash-Ohio Bottomlands
  - 72b - Glaciated Wabash Lowlands
  - 72c - The Southern Wabash Lowlands

== World Wildlife Fund ==
Realm	Biome	Ecoregion	State Location
Nearctic	Temperate broadleaf and mixed forests	Central U.S. hardwood forests	Southern Indiana
Nearctic	Temperate broadleaf and mixed forests	Southern Great Lakes forests	North, Central, and Eastern Indiana
Nearctic	Temperate grasslands, savannas, and shrublands	Central forest-grasslands transition	Western Indiana

== See also ==
- Geography of Indiana
- Climate of Indiana
- List of ecoregions in the United States (EPA)
- List of ecoregions in the United States (WWF)
