= White County Asylum =

Historic US home in Indiana

- U.S. National Register of Historic Places
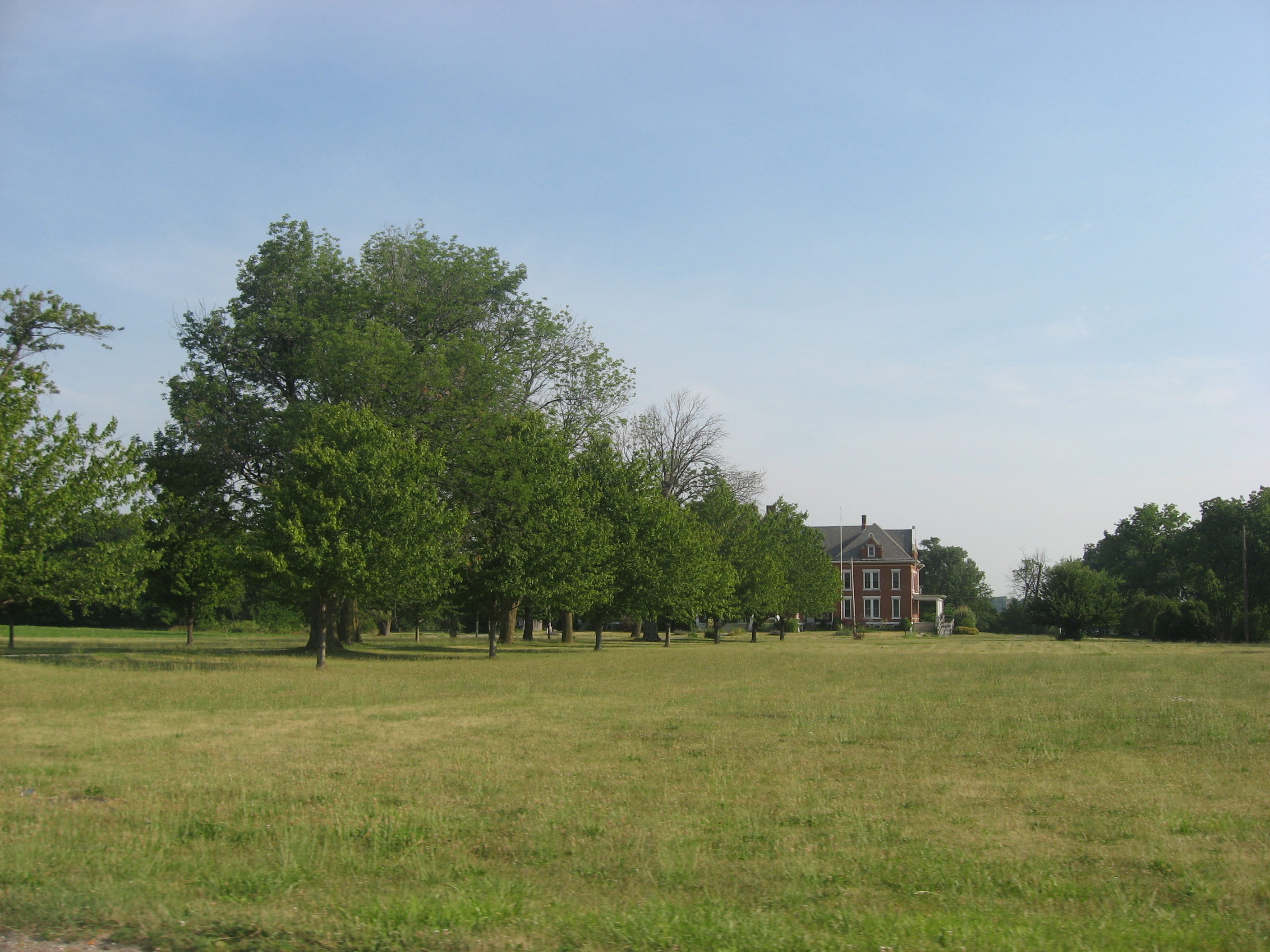
- White County Asylum, June 2012
- Location: Union Township, White County, Indiana
- Built: 1907-1908
- Architectural style: Richardsonian; Romanesque
- NRHP reference No.: 10000857
- Added to NRHP: September 23, 2010

White County Asylum, also known as the Lakeview Home, was a historic county home located at Union Township, White County, Indiana. The main building was built in 1907–1908, and was a large four-level, Richardsonian Romanesque style brick building with limestone and brick trim. It consisted of a central administrative section flanked by residential wings. The building featured a high hipped roof. Also on the property is a contributing gable roofed barn (1908). The property is a contributing site.

It was listed on the National Register of Historic Places in 2010.
