= B. J. Hollars =

B.J. Hollars
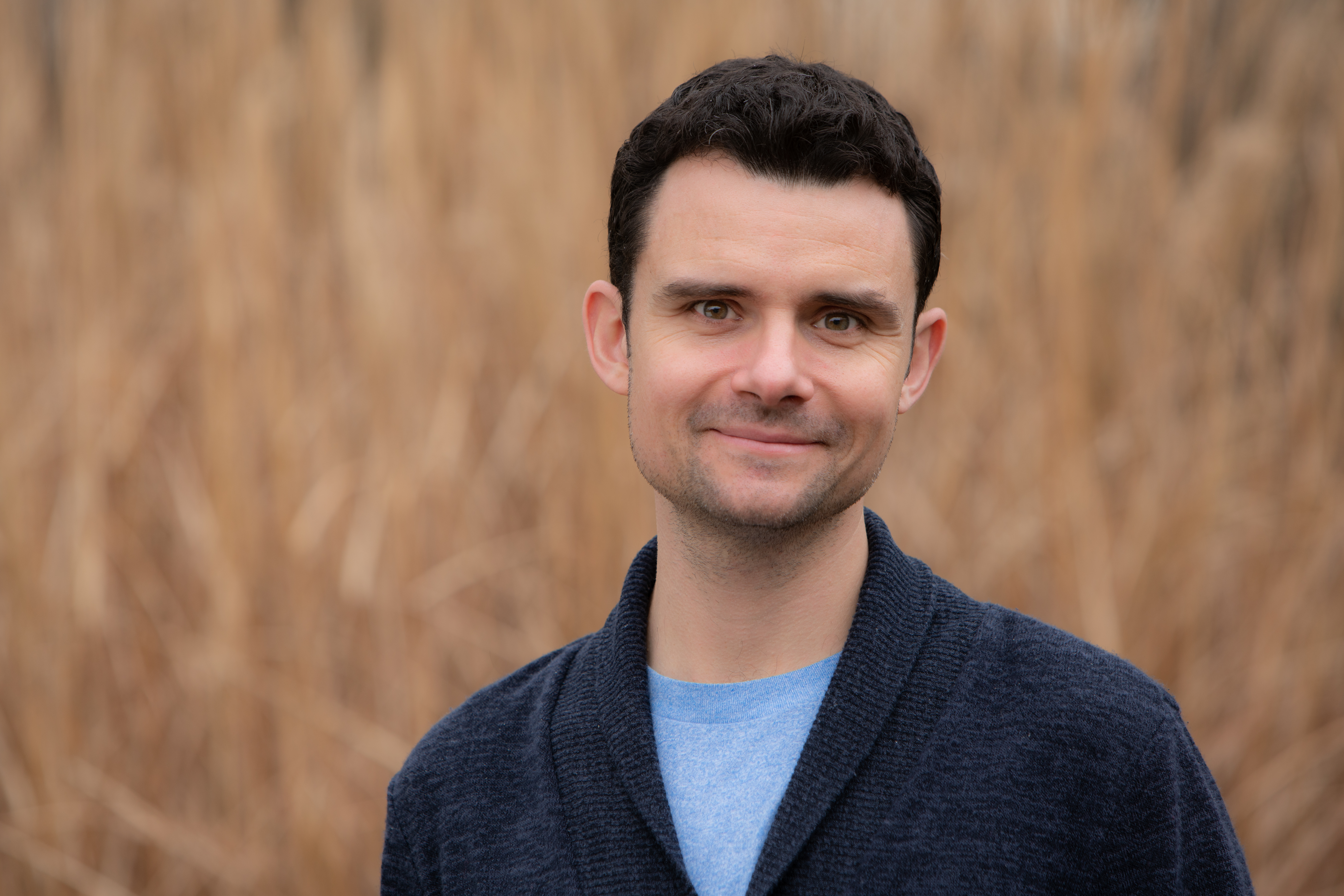
- Born: 1984 (age 41–42); Monticello, Indiana
- Occupations: Writer and teacher

B.J. Hollars (born 1984) is an American author of literary essays and nonfiction novels. Hollars is professor of English at the University of Wisconsin-Eau Claire and a columnist for the Leader-Telegram.

Hollars is the recipient of the Truman Capote Prize for Literary Nonfiction, the Anne B. and James B. McMillan Prize, the Council of Wisconsin Writers' Blei-Derleth Award, the Society of Midland Authors Award, and received a 2022 silver medal from the Midwest Book Awards .

== Life and work ==
B.J. Hollars was born in Monticello, Indiana in 1984. He graduated from Knox College. He received his M.F.A. in creative writing from the University of Alabama in 2010. Hollars's essays have appeared in The Washington Post, Parents Magazine, The Rumpus, TriQuarterly, The Millions, Huffington Post, North American Review, Quarterly West, and many other literary journals.

He is a professor of English at the University of Wisconsin-Eau Claire and a columnist for the Leader-Telegram.

== Works ==
=== Books ===
- Hope Is the Thing: Wisconsinites on Perseverance in a Pandemic (ed.)
- Go West Young Man: A Father and Son Rediscover America on the Oregon Trail (Bison Books, 2021; ISBN 9781496225900)
- Midwestern Strange: Hunting Monsters, Martians and the Weird in Flyover Country
- The Road South: Personal Stories of the Freedom Riders (U of Alabama P, 2018, 3rd ed.; ISBN 978-0817319809)
- Flock Together: A Love Affair with Extinct Birds
- From the Mouths of Dogs: What Our Pets Teach Us About Life, Death, and Being Human
- This Is Only A Test
- Dispatches from the Drownings: Reporting the Fiction of Nonfiction
- Opening the Doors: The Desegregation of the University of Alabama and the Fight for Civil Rights in Tuscaloosa
- Sightings: Stories
- Thirteen Loops: Race, Violence and the Last Lynching in America
- Blurring the Boundaries: Explorations to the Fringes of Nonfiction (ed.)
- Monsters: A Collection of Literary Sightings
- You Must Be This Tall To Ride: Contemporary Writers Take You Inside the Story (ed.)

=== Chapbooks ===
- Harbingers (Bull City Press, 2018)
- In Defense of Monsters (Bull City Press, 2017)
