= James Culbertson Reynolds House =

Historic house in Indiana, United States

- U.S. National Register of Historic Places
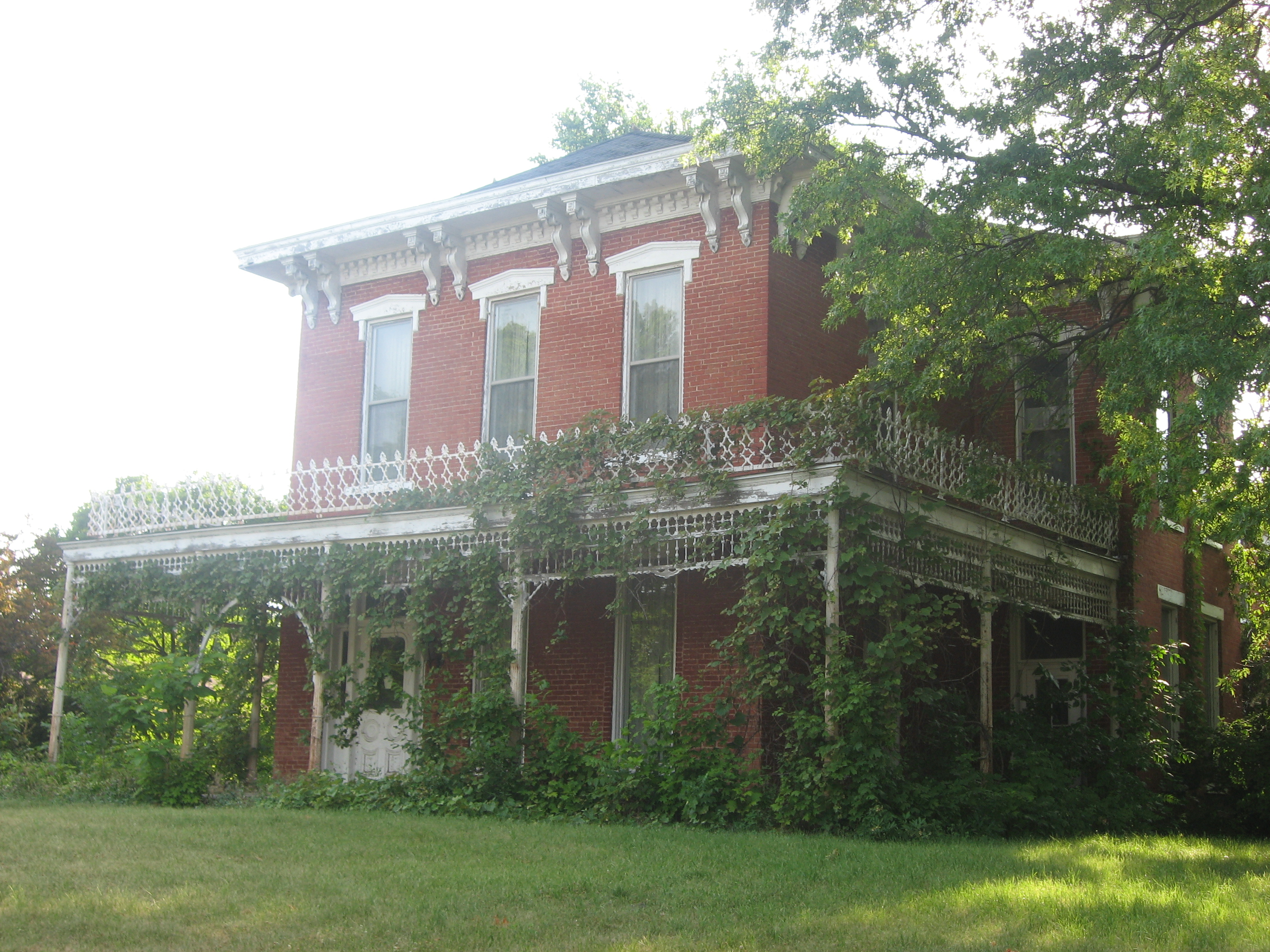
- James Culbertson Reynolds House, June 2012

- Location within Indiana Location within the United States
- Location: 417 N. Main St., Monticello, Indiana
- Coordinates: 40°44′57″N 86°45′41″W
- Area: 0.5 acres (0.20 ha)
- Built: 1873
- Architect: Kingsbury, Ira S.
- Architectural style: Italianate
- NRHP reference No.: 82000054
- Added to NRHP: June 17, 1982

James Culbertson Reynolds House is a historic home located at Monticello, Indiana. It was built in 1873, and is a large two-story, Italianate style brick dwelling. It features an intricately designed front porch and decorative cornice with large brackets. Also on the property are the contributing coal shed (now a garage) and smokehouse.

It was listed on the National Register of Historic Places in 1982.
