= Norway, Indiana =

- Census-designated place
- Location of Norway in White County, Indiana.
- Coordinates: 40°46′55″N 86°46′4″W
- Country: United States
- State: Indiana
- County: White
- Township: Union
- Founded: 1845
- Founder: John Armstrong
- Named for: Norway

Area
  - Total: 0.96 sq mi (2.48 km^{2})
  - Land: 0.89 sq mi (2.31 km^{2})
  - Water: 0.066 sq mi (0.17 km^{2})
- Elevation: 633 ft (193 m)

Population (2020)
  - Total: 327
  - Density: 365.9/sq mi (141.27/km^{2})
- Time zone: UTC-5 (Eastern (EST))
  - Summer (DST): UTC-4 (EDT)
- ZIP code: 47960
- FIPS code: 18-55350
- GNIS feature ID: 440358

Norway is a census-designated place (CDP) in Union Township, White County, in the U.S. state of Indiana. The population was 327 at the 2020 census.

== History ==
Norway was originally called Mt. Walleston, and under the latter name was laid out in 1845 by John Armstrong. A large share of the early settlers being natives of Norway caused the present name to be selected. A post office was established at Norway in 1898, but was soon discontinued, in 1899.

== Geography ==
Norway is located at 40°46′55″N 86°46′4″W (40.781877, -86.767850).

According to the United States Census Bureau, the CDP has a total area of 0.9 square miles (2.3 km^{2}), of which 0.9 square miles (2.3 km^{2}) is land and 0.1 square miles (0.26 km^{2}) (6.32%) is water.

Norway is on Tippecanoe River just below the Norway Dam. The dam holds Lake Shafer, the home of Indiana Beach, an amusement park and campground. Norway's Southern boundary is also the Northern boundary of Monticello, the more populated county seat and just west of Norway there is the golf course and hotel resort, Pine View.

Despite the small area and population, the central location of Norway and the convenience of the Norway Bridge river crossing (connecting the more populated West Shafer and East Shafer Drives) have allowed for the continued presence and success of several restaurants and other small businesses.

== Demographics ==
Historical population
Census	Pop.	Note	%±
2020	327		—
U.S. Decennial Census

As of the census of 2000, there were 437 people, 169 households, and 126 families residing in the CDP. The population density was 491.4 inhabitants per square mile (189.7/km^{2}). There were 208 housing units at an average density of 233.9 per square mile (90.3/km^{2}). The racial makeup of the CDP was 98.40% White, 0.23% Native American, 0.23% Asian, 0.23% from other races, and 0.92% from two or more races. Hispanic or Latino of any race were 2.75% of the population.

There were 169 households, out of which 30.8% had children under the age of 18 living with them, 53.3% were married couples living together, 16.0% had a female householder with no husband present, and 24.9% were non-families. 20.7% of all households were made up of individuals, and 10.1% had someone living alone who was 65 years of age or older. The average household size was 2.49 and the average family size was 2.81.

In the CDP, the population was spread out, with 23.3% under the age of 18, 7.3% from 18 to 24, 27.0% from 25 to 44, 28.6% from 45 to 64, and 13.7% who were 65 years of age or older. The median age was 40 years. For every 100 females, there were 92.5 males. For every 100 females age 18 and over, there were 89.3 males.

The median income for a household in the CDP was $28,214, and the median income for a family was $25,486. Males had a median income of $28,750 versus $16,154 for females. The per capita income for the CDP was $16,681. About 15.6% of families and 19.5% of the population were below the poverty line, including 43.2% of those under age 18 and 47.6% of those age 65 or over.
