= South Grade School Building =

- U.S. National Register of Historic Places
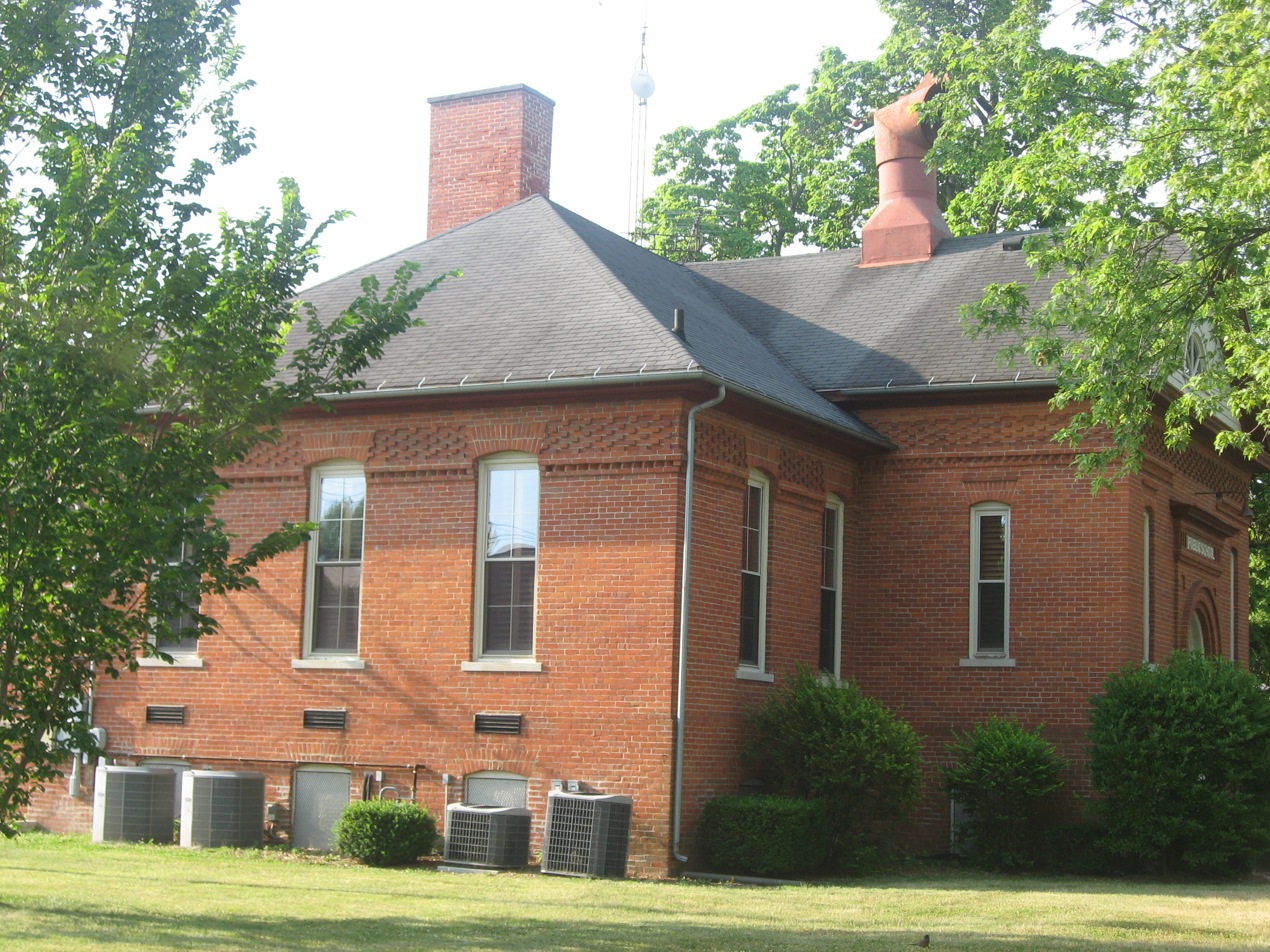
- South Grade School Building, June 2012

- Location within Indiana Location within the United States
- Location: 565 S. Main St., Monticello, Indiana
- Coordinates: 40°44′17″N 86°45′40″W
- Area: less than one acre
- Built: 1892
- Architect: Welker, L.C.
- NRHP reference No.: 85002136
- Added to NRHP: September 12, 1985

South Grade School Building, also known as the Administration Building, Twin Lakes School Corporation, is a historic two-room school building located at Monticello, Indiana. It was built in 1892, and is a 1 1/2-story, brick building with a gable on hip roof. It is seven bays wide and has a three bay wide central pedimented pavilion.

It was listed on the National Register of Historic Places in 1985.
