= Monticello Carnegie Library =

- U.S. National Register of Historic Places
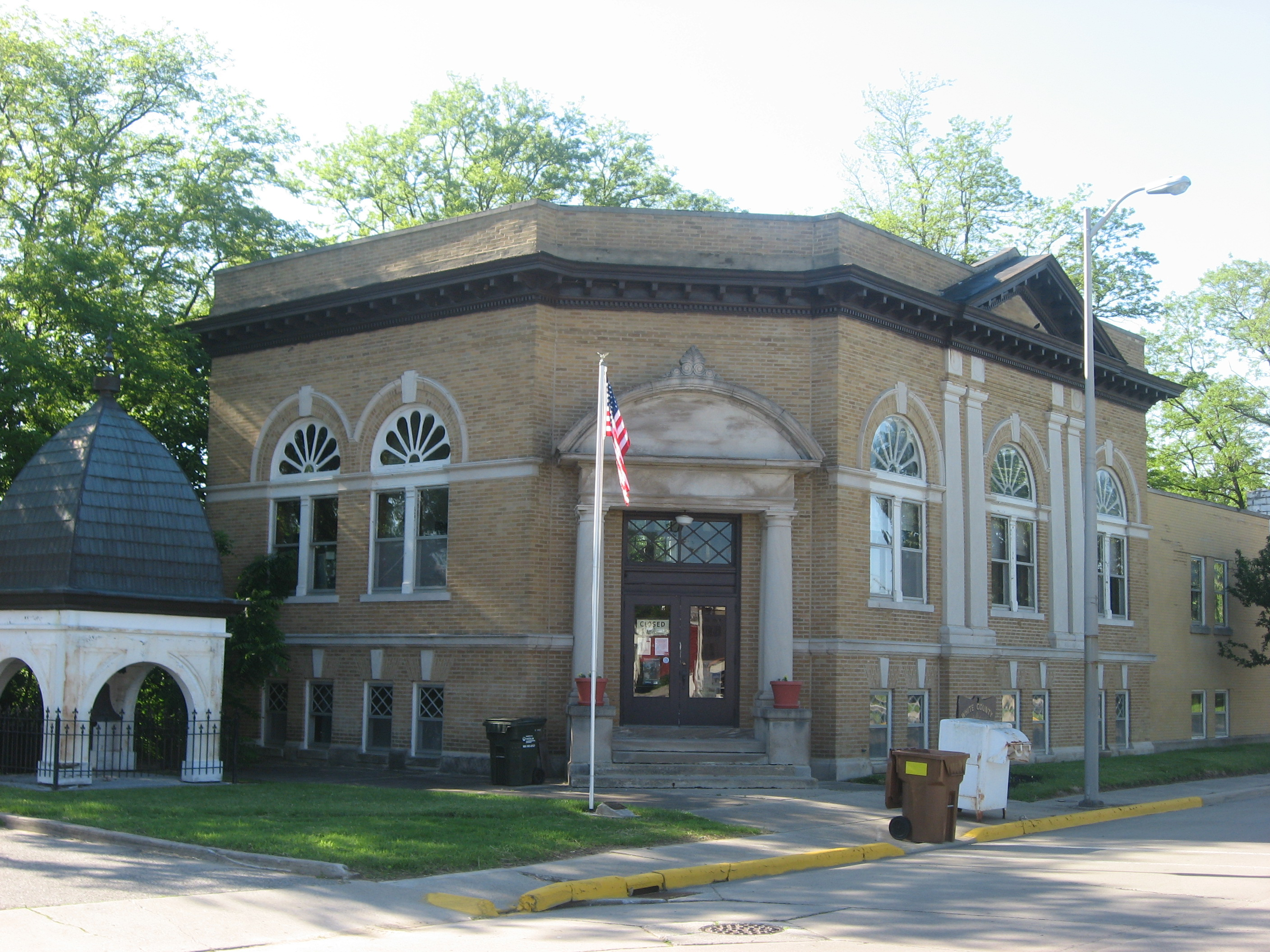
- Monticello Carnegie Library, June 2013

- Location within Indiana Location within the United States
- Location: 101 S. Bluff St., Monticello, Indiana
- Coordinates: 40°44′41″N 86°45′37″W
- Area: less than one acre
- Built: 1907; 119 years ago, 1957; 69 years ago (2nd story added)
- Architect: Kendrick, Charles E.
- Architectural style: Classical Revival
- NRHP reference No.: 13000428
- Added to NRHP: June 25, 2013

Monticello Carnegie Library, also known as the White County Historical Society, is a former library in the historic Carnegie library building located at Monticello, Indiana. It was built in 1907, and is a two-story, Classical Revival style buff brick building on a raised basement. It features a large limestone entrance portico and full round arched window openings. A two-story addition was built in 1957. The original building was constructed with a $10,000 grant from the Carnegie Foundation.

It was listed on the National Register of Historic Places in 2013. The old Monticello Carnegie Library no longer contains a public library. It functions today as the offices of the White County Indiana Historical Society. The town's present public library is the Monticello-Union Township Public Library at 321 W. Broadway St.
