= Wolcott House (Wolcott, Indiana) =

Historic house in Indiana, United States

- Historic Wolcott House
- U.S. National Register of Historic Places
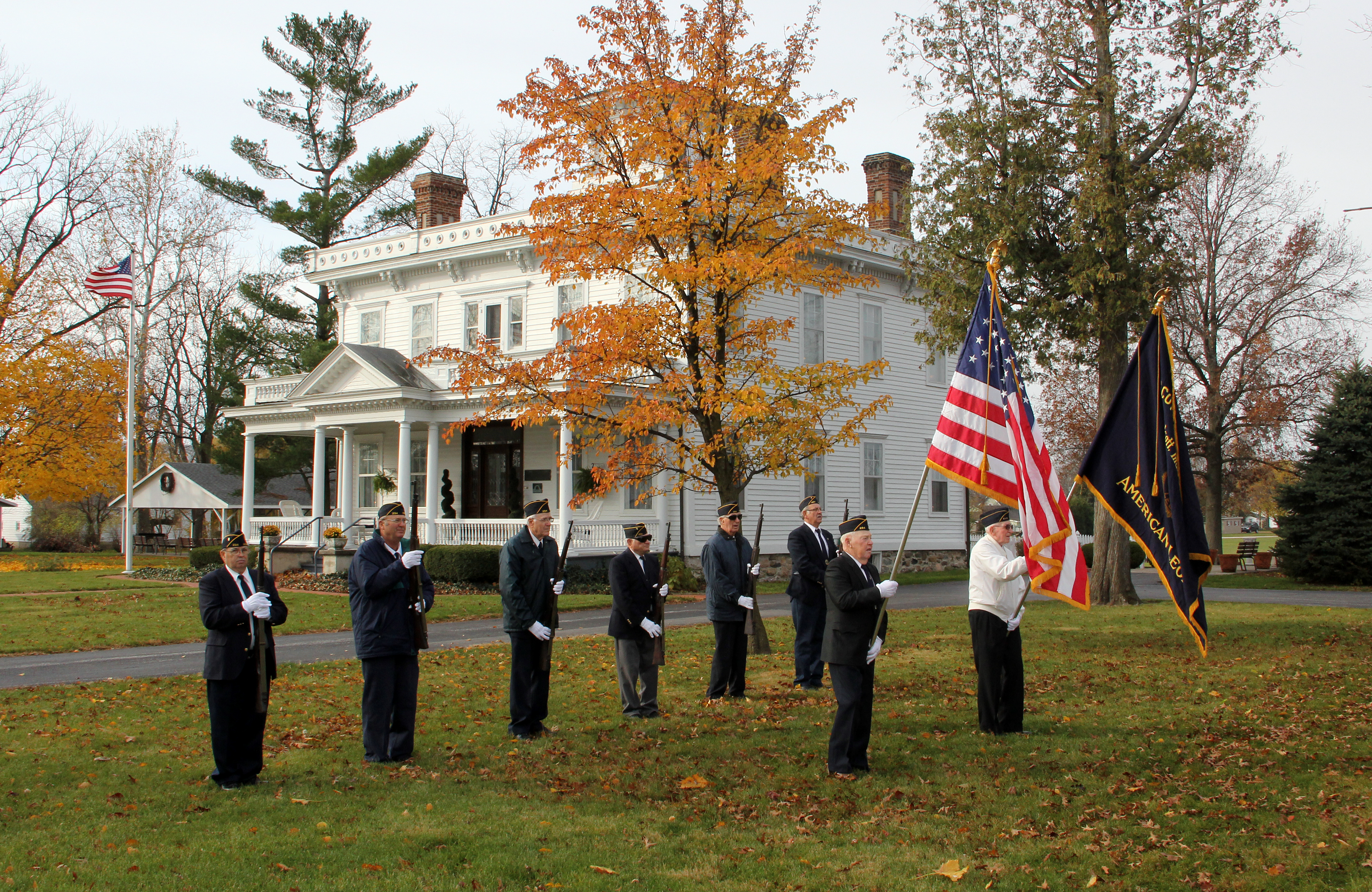
- Historic Wolcott House, November 2011
- Location: 500 N. Range St., Wolcott, Indiana
- Area: 9.6 acres (3.9 ha)
- Built: 1859
- Built by: Anson Wolcott
- Architectural style: Italianate
- NRHP reference No.: 75000040
- Added to NRHP: October 10, 1975

Historic Wolcott House is a historic home located at Wolcott, Indiana. It was built about 1859 by Anson Wolcott the founder of the town of Wolcott. It is a two-story, Italianate style wood-frame building with a rectangular wing. It sits on a rubblestone foundation and has a [wood shake] hipped roof. It was home to three generations of the politically prominent Wolcott family. The Anson Wolcott Historical Society is the caretaker of this beautiful historic home.

It was listed on the National Register of Historic Places in 1975.
