= Monticello, Indiana =

- City
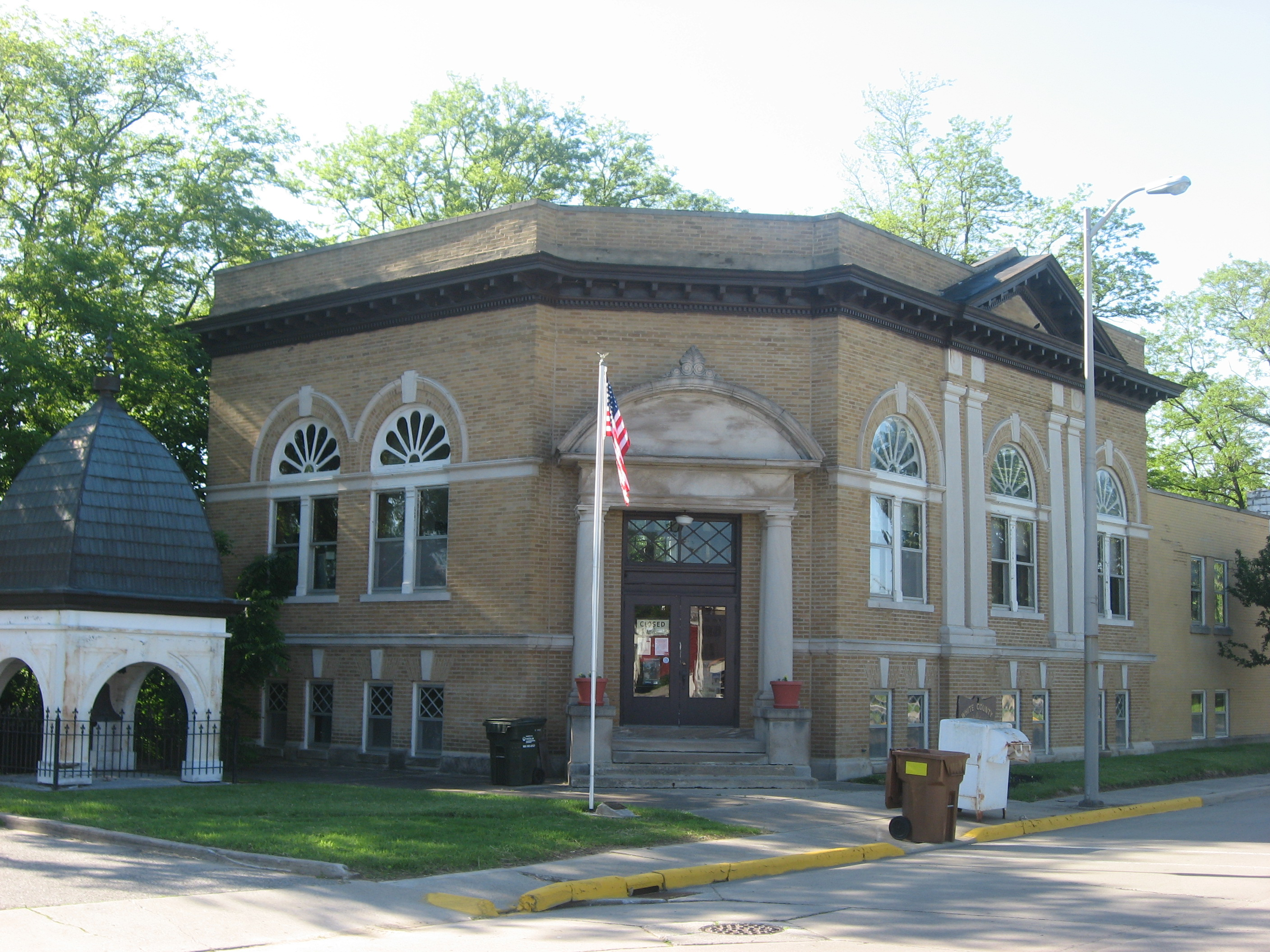
- Monticello Carnegie Library

- Flag
- Motto: "Life With A Splash"
- Location of Monticello in White County, Indiana
- Coordinates: 40°44′48″N 86°45′55″W
- Country: United States
- State: Indiana
- County: White
- Township: Union
- Established: 1834
- Incorporated: 1853

Government
  - Mayor: Aaron Sims (R)

Area
  - Total: 3.68 sq mi (9.53 km^{2})
  - Land: 3.47 sq mi (8.98 km^{2})
  - Water: 0.21 sq mi (0.55 km^{2}) 5.96%
- Elevation: 682 ft (208 m)

Population (2020)
  - Total: 5,508
  - Density: 1,589.2/sq mi (613.61/km^{2})
- Time zone: UTC-5 (EST)
  - Summer (DST): UTC-4 (EDT)
- ZIP code: 47960
- Area code: 574
- FIPS code: 18-50760
- GNIS feature ID: 2395383
- Website: www.monticelloin.gov

Monticello (/ˌmɒntɪˈsɛloʊ/ MON-tiss-EL-oh) is a city in and the county seat of White County, Indiana, United States. The population was 5,508 at the 2020 census. Monticello is known as a tourist destination in north-central Indiana and is home to the Indiana Beach amusement park on Lake Shafer, and Lake Freeman.

== History ==
Monticello was laid out in 1834 as the county seat, with a post office established that year, and is still currently in operation. The city was named after President Thomas Jefferson's estate in Virginia. In 1853, Monticello was officially incorporated as a town.

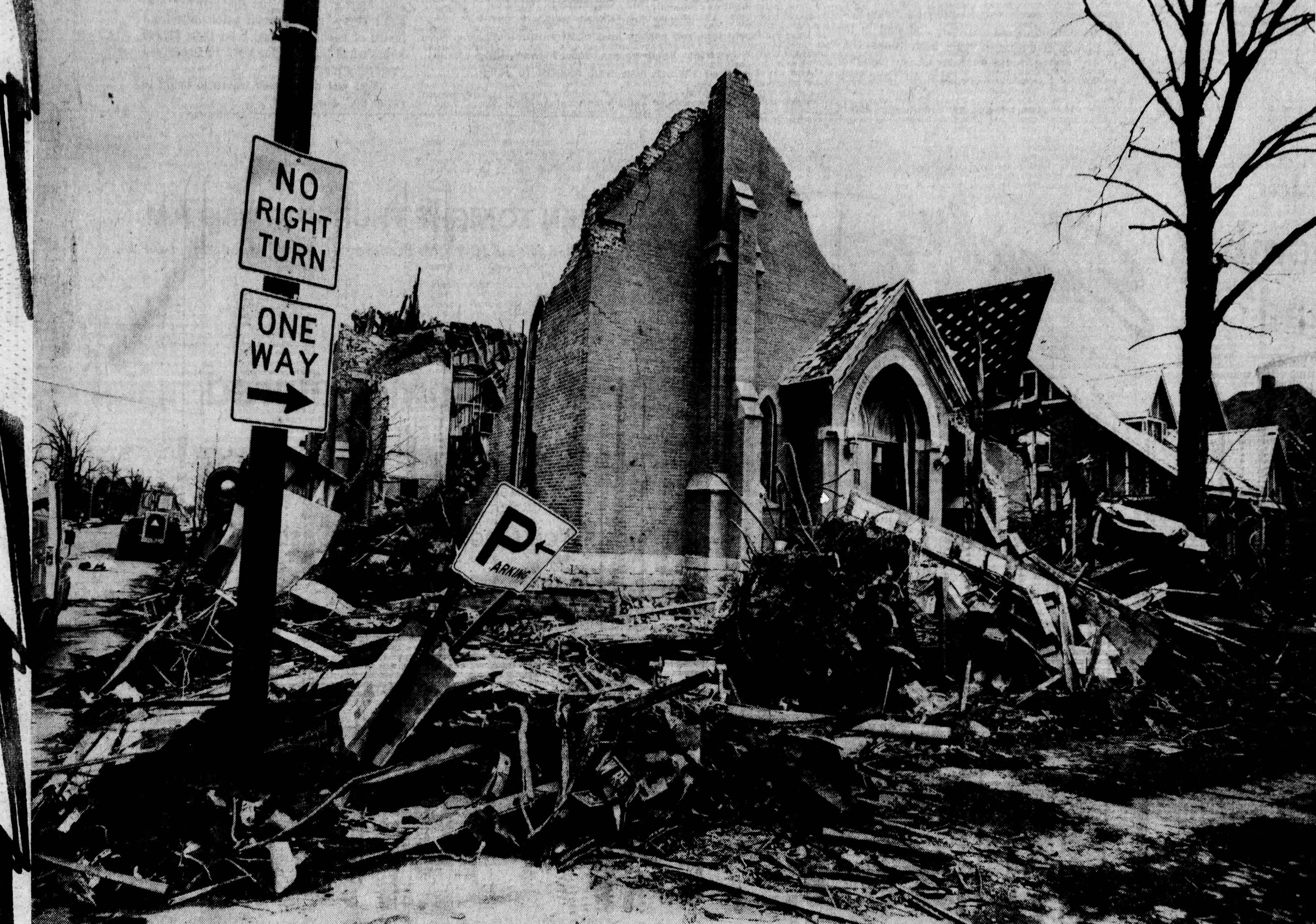
Monticello church destroyed by a tornado in April 1974

Monticello, Indiana sustained serious damage by a tornado on April 3, 1974, part of the 1974 Super Outbreak that caused death and destruction across the midwest and south. The aftermath of this storm is recorded in the Herald Journal's book, Killer Tornado. The tornado was rated F4 on the Fujita scale. This storm killed eight people and was part of tornado family that killed 18, causing an estimated $100 million in damage. In the immediate aftermath of the storm, news outlets reported three hundred deaths across the United States and the creation of temporary morgues. The local paper said the aftermath was similar to a World War II bombing.

On September 2, 2005, Jordan Manufacturing burned down. The company manufactured outdoor furniture such as folding chairs, umbrellas, and seat cushions. Due to the materials used in making these products, four city blocks were contaminated with toxins. The blaze was large enough to require firefighters from seven surrounding communities to battle it and needed approximately "3000 gallons of water per minute for the first three hours of the blaze." While such a fire might not be a big event for a larger city, it had a profound impact on Monticello, as Jordan Manufacturing was one of the few manufacturing plants left in the city after a recession in the 2000s.

The Monticello Carnegie Library, James Culbertson Reynolds House, and South Grade School Building are listed on the National Register of Historic Places.

== Geography ==
Monticello is located at 40°44′48″N 86°45′55″W (40.746709, -86.765359).

According to the 2010 census, Monticello has a total area of 3.686 square miles (9.55 km^{2}), of which 3.47 square miles (8.99 km^{2}) (or 94.14%) is land and 0.216 square miles (0.56 km^{2}) (or 5.86%) is water.

== Demographics ==
Historical population
Census	Pop.	Note	%±
1860	565		—
1870	887		57.0%
1880	1,193		34.5%
1890	1,518		27.2%
1900	2,107		38.8%
1910	2,168		2.9%
1920	2,536		17.0%
1930	2,331		−8.1%
1940	3,153		35.3%
1950	3,467		10.0%
1960	4,035		16.4%
1970	4,869		20.7%
1980	5,162		6.0%
1990	5,237		1.5%
2000	5,723		9.3%
2010	5,378		−6.0%
2020	5,508		2.4%
U.S. Decennial Census

=== 2020 census ===
As of the 2020 census, Monticello had a population of 5,508. The median age was 42.1 years. 22.1% of residents were under the age of 18 and 22.1% of residents were 65 years of age or older. For every 100 females there were 91.4 males, and for every 100 females age 18 and over there were 86.7 males age 18 and over.

98.2% of residents lived in urban areas, while 1.8% lived in rural areas.

There were 2,296 households in Monticello, of which 28.1% had children under the age of 18 living in them. Of all households, 37.3% were married-couple households, 19.2% were households with a male householder and no spouse or partner present, and 34.5% were households with a female householder and no spouse or partner present. About 36.8% of all households were made up of individuals and 19.1% had someone living alone who was 65 years of age or older.

There were 2,540 housing units, of which 9.6% were vacant. The homeowner vacancy rate was 2.0% and the rental vacancy rate was 8.4%.

Racial composition as of the 2020 census
Race	Number	Percent
White	4,616	83.8%
Black or African American	43	0.8%
American Indian and Alaska Native	18	0.3%
Asian	28	0.5%
Native Hawaiian and Other Pacific Islander	0	0.0%
Some other race	383	7.0%
Two or more races	420	7.6%
Hispanic or Latino (of any race)	742	13.5%

=== 2010 census ===
At the 2010 census there were 5,378 people, 2,179 households, and 1,319 families living in the city. The population density was 1,549.9 inhabitants per square mile (598.4/km^{2}). There were 2,457 housing units at an average density of 708.1 per square mile (273.4/km^{2}). The racial makup of the city was 90.8% White or European American, 0.4% African American, 0.4% Native American, 0.8% Asian, 5.5% from other races, and 2.1% from two or more races. Hispanic or Latino of any race were 12.5%.

Of the 2,179 households 31.1% had children under the age of 18 living with them, 42.6% were married couples living together, 13.1% had a female householder with no husband present, 4.9% had a male householder with no wife present, and 39.5% were non-families. 34.6% of households were one person and 18.1% were one person aged 65 or older. The average household size was 2.33 and the average family size was 2.99.

The median age was 40.4 years. 24% of residents were under the age of 18; 8.1% were between the ages of 18 and 24; 23.1% were from 25 to 44; 23.6% were from 45 to 64; and 21.1% were 65 or older. The gender makeup of the city was 47.3% male and 52.7% female.

=== 2000 census ===
At the 2000 census there were 5,723 people, 2,268 households, and 1,417 families living in the city. The population density was 2,047.9 inhabitants per square mile (790.7/km^{2}). There were 2,414 housing units at an average density of 863.8 per square mile (333.5/km^{2}). The racial makup of the city was 91.39% White, 0.28% African American, 0.31% Native American, 0.59% Asian, 0.07% Pacific Islander, 5.96% from other races, and 1.40% from two or more races. Hispanic or Latino of any race were 11.22%.

Of the 2,268 households 29.1% had children under the age of 18 living with them, 48.2% were married couples living together, 10.7% had a female householder with no husband present, and 37.5% were non-families. 32.2% of households were one person and 16.5% were one person aged 65 or older. The average household size was 2.40 and the average family size was 3.04.

The age distribution was 24.3% under the age of 18, 9.3% from 18 to 24, 26.4% from 25 to 44, 21.1% from 45 to 64, and 18.9% 65 or older. The median age was 38 years. For every 100 females, there were 91.0 males. For every 100 females age 18 and over, there were 83.5 males.

The median household income was $35,537 and the median family income was $42,831. Males had a median income of $30,478 versus $19,511 for females. The per capita income for the city was $17,066. About 4.8% of families and 8.1% of the population were below the poverty line, including 8.3% of those under age 18 and 9.7% of those age 65 or over.

== Arts and culture ==
The lakes and campgrounds are popular tourist destinations, but the most well-known is Indiana Beach, an amusement park on Lake Shafer.

The Madam Carroll, docked on Lake Freeman, offers scenic lake cruises with live entertainment. Dinner cruises are also held on certain dates.

== Education ==
Twin Lakes School Corporation is the school system in Monticello. The Schools are Eastlawn (elementary), Oaklawn (elementary), Meadowlawn (elementary), Roosevelt Middle School, and Twin Lakes High School. Woodlawn Elementary School was previously part of the district until it was closed in 2013.

The High School was heavily damaged by the 1974 tornado and had to be rebuilt. Students resumed classes in local churches and then in portable units erected near the location of the high school until reconstruction could be completed.

The town has a lending library, the Monticello-Union Township Public Library.

== Notable people ==
- DJ Ashba (born 1972), rock musician
- W. E. Biederwolf (1867–1939), Presbyterian evangelist; buried in Old Monticello Cemetery
- BJ Hollars (born 1984), an American author and artist
- Gregory Wasson (born 1958), president and CEO of Walgreens
